= List of 2013 UCI ProTeams and riders =

This page is a list of 2013 UCI ProTeams and riders. These teams competed in the 2013 UCI World Tour.

== Teams overview ==
The 19 ProTeams in 2013 were:

Code	Official team name	License holder	Country	Groupset	Bicycles
ALM	Ag2r–La Mondiale (2013 season)	EUSRL France Cyclisme	France	SRAM	Focus
ARG	Argos–Shimano (2013 season)	SMS Cycling	Netherlands	Shimano	Felt
AST	Astana (2013 season)	Olympus Sarl	Kazakhstan	Campagnolo	Specialized
BMC	BMC Racing Team (2013 season)	Continuum Sports LLC	United States	Shimano	BMC
EUS	Euskaltel–Euskadi (2013 season)	Fundación Ciclista Euskadi	Spain	Shimano	Orbea
FDJ	FDJ.fr (2013 season)	Société de Gestion de L'Echappée	France	Shimano	Lapierre
GRM	Garmin–Sharp (2013 season)	Slipstream Sports, LLC	United States	Shimano	Cervélo
OGE	Orica–GreenEDGE (2013 season)	Lachlan Smith	Australia	Shimano	Scott
LAM	Lampre–Merida (2013 season)	Total Cycling Limited	Italy	Shimano	Mérida
CAN	Cannondale (2013 season)	Brixia Sports	Italy	SRAM	Cannondale
LTB	Lotto–Belisol (2013 season)	Belgian Cycling Company sa	Belgium	Campagnolo	Ridley
MOV	Movistar Team (2013 season)	Abarca Sports S.L.	Spain	Campagnolo	Pinarello
OPQ	Omega Pharma–Quick-Step (2013 season)	Esperanza bvba	Belgium	SRAM	Specialized
BEL	Belkin Pro Cycling (2013 season)	Rabo Wielerploegen	Netherlands	Shimano	Giant
KAT	Team Katusha (2013 season)	Katusha Management SA	Russia	Shimano	Canyon
RLT	RadioShack–Leopard (2013 season)	Trek Bicycle Corporation (Note: Trek announced that it bought the license of RadioShack Leopard on 26 June 2013.)	Luxembourg	Shimano	Trek
SAX	Saxo–Tinkoff (2013 season)	Riis Cycling A/S	Denmark	SRAM	Specialized
SKY	Team Sky (2013 season)	Tour Racing Limited	United Kingdom	Shimano	Pinarello
VCD	Vacansoleil–DCM (2013 season)	STL–Pro Cycling B.V.	Netherlands	Shimano	Bianchi

Argos–Shimano were promoted up to the top division of teams for this season, whilst Team Katusha were somewhat controversially removed from the World Tour peloton. On 15 February 2013 the Court of Arbitration for Sport upheld Team Katusha's appeal against the UCI's decision not to issue them a World Tour licence. On 18 February 2013 the UCI announced that, contrary to previous assertions, 19 teams would hold ProTeam status for this season. This caused Paris–Nice and the Giro d'Italia to accommodate 23 teams as Team Katusha were not given a wild card invite when they were a Pro-Continental team, but would now be invited as a ProTeam.

One team changed its name twice – having been known as Rabobank in 2012, the team became Blanco Pro Cycling after Rabobank withdrew their title sponsorship. Ahead of the Tour de France, Belkin acquired title sponsorship, with the team becoming Belkin Pro Cycling.

FDJ also changed its name to FDJ.fr.

== Riders ==
=== Ag2r–La Mondiale ===
Rider	Date of birth
Davide Appollonio (ITA)	2 June 1989 (aged 23)
Gediminas Bagdonas (LTU)	26 December 1985 (aged 27)
Romain Bardet (FRA)	9 November 1990 (aged 22)
Manuel Belletti (ITA)	14 October 1985 (aged 27)
Julien Bérard (FRA)	2 July 1987 (aged 25)
Carlos Betancur (COL)	13 October 1989 (aged 23)
Guillaume Bonnafond (FRA)	23 June 1987 (aged 25)
Maxime Bouet (FRA)	3 November 1986 (aged 26)
Frédéric Brun (Note: Brun joined the team on 1 August as a stagiaire, from the Bourg-en-Bresse Ain Cyclisme team.) (FRA)	18 August 1988 (aged 24)
Steve Chainel (FRA)	6 September 1983 (aged 29)
Gabriel Chavanne (Note: Chavanne joined the team on 1 August as a stagiaire, from the Chambéry Cyclisme Formation.) (SUI)	20 January 1992 (aged 20)
Mikaël Cherel (FRA)	17 March 1986 (aged 26)
Axel Domont (FRA)	7 August 1990 (aged 22)
Samuel Dumoulin (FRA)	20 August 1980 (aged 32)
Hubert Dupont (FRA)	13 November 1980 (aged 32)
John Gadret (FRA)	22 April 1979 (aged 33)

Rider	Date of birth
Ben Gastauer (LUX)	14 November 1987 (aged 25)
Sylvain Georges (Note: Georges was sacked by the team on 31 May, following a positive test for heptaminol.) (FRA)	1 May 1984 (aged 28)
Hugo Houle (CAN)	27 September 1990 (aged 22)
Yauheni Hutarovich (BLR)	29 November 1983 (aged 29)
Valentin Iglinsky (KAZ)	12 May 1984 (aged 28)
Blel Kadri (FRA)	3 September 1986 (aged 26)
Julian Kern (GER)	28 December 1989 (aged 23)
Pierre Latour (Note: Latour joined the team on 1 August as a stagiaire, from the Chambéry Cyclisme Formation.) (FRA)	12 October 1993 (aged 19)
Sébastien Minard (FRA)	12 June 1982 (aged 30)
Lloyd Mondory (FRA)	26 April 1982 (aged 30)
Matteo Montaguti (ITA)	6 January 1984 (aged 28)
Rinaldo Nocentini (ITA)	25 September 1977 (aged 35)
Jean-Christophe Péraud (FRA)	22 May 1977 (aged 35)
Domenico Pozzovivo (ITA)	30 November 1982 (aged 30)
Anthony Ravard (FRA)	28 September 1983 (aged 29)
Christophe Riblon (FRA)	17 January 1981 (aged 31)

=== Argos–Shimano ===
Rider	Date of birth
Jonas Ahlstrand (SWE)	16 February 1990 (aged 22)
Nikias Arndt (GER)	18 November 1991 (aged 21)
Warren Barguil (FRA)	28 October 1991 (aged 21)
Will Clarke (AUS)	11 April 1985 (aged 27)
Roy Curvers (NED)	27 December 1979 (aged 33)
Thomas Damuseau (FRA)	18 March 1989 (aged 23)
Bert De Backer (BEL)	2 April 1984 (aged 28)
Koen de Kort (NED)	8 September 1982 (aged 30)
John Degenkolb (GER)	7 January 1989 (aged 23)
Tom Dumoulin (NED)	11 November 1990 (aged 22)
Johannes Fröhlinger (GER)	9 June 1985 (aged 27)
Simon Geschke (GER)	13 March 1986 (aged 26)
Patrick Gretsch (GER)	7 April 1987 (aged 25)
Nikodemus Holler (Note: Holler joined the team on 1 August as a stagiaire, from the Thüringer Energie Team.) (GER)	4 May 1991 (aged 21)
Yann Huguet (FRA)	2 May 1984 (aged 28)
Thierry Hupond (FRA)	10 November 1984 (aged 28)

Rider	Date of birth
Reinardt Janse van Rensburg (RSA)	3 February 1989 (aged 23)
Quentin Jaurégui (Note: Jaurégui joined the team on 1 August as a stagiaire, from BKCP–Powerplus.) (FRA)	22 April 1994 (aged 18)
Ji Cheng (CHN)	15 July 1987 (aged 25)
Marcel Kittel (GER)	11 May 1988 (aged 24)
Tobias Ludvigsson (SWE)	22 February 1991 (aged 21)
Luka Mezgec (SLO)	27 June 1988 (aged 24)
Michael Olsson (Note: Olsson joined the team on 1 August as a stagiaire, from Team People4you-Unaas Cycling.) (SWE)	4 March 1986 (aged 26)
François Parisien (CAN)	27 April 1982 (aged 30)
Thomas Peterson (USA)	24 December 1986 (aged 26)
Georg Preidler (AUT)	17 June 1990 (aged 22)
Ramon Sinkeldam (NED)	9 February 1989 (aged 23)
Matthieu Sprick (FRA)	29 September 1981 (aged 31)
Tom Stamsnijder (NED)	15 May 1985 (aged 27)
Albert Timmer (NED)	13 June 1985 (aged 27)
Tom Veelers (NED)	14 September 1984 (aged 28)
Yan Dong Xing (Note: Xing joined the team on 20 March.) (CHN)	20 March 1985 (aged 27)

=== Astana ===
Rider	Date of birth
Valerio Agnoli (ITA)	6 January 1985 (age 41)
Fabio Aru (ITA)	3 July 1990 (age 35)
Assan Bazayev (KAZ)	22 February 1981 (age 45)
Borut Božič (SLO)	8 August 1980 (age 45)
Janez Brajkovič (SLO)	18 December 1983 (age 42)
Alexsandr Dyachenko (KAZ)	17 October 1983 (age 42)
Jakob Fuglsang (DEN)	22 March 1985 (age 41)
Enrico Gasparotto (ITA)	22 March 1982 (age 44)
Francesco Gavazzi (ITA)	1 August 1984 (age 41)
Dmitriy Gruzdev (KAZ)	13 March 1986 (age 40)
Andrea Guardini (ITA)	12 June 1989 (age 36)
Jacopo Guarnieri (ITA)	14 August 1987 (age 38)
Andriy Hrivko (UKR)	7 August 1983 (age 42)
Evan Huffman (USA)	7 January 1990 (age 36)
Maxim Iglinsky (KAZ)	18 April 1981 (age 44)

Rider	Date of birth
Arman Kamyshev (KAZ)	14 March 1991 (age 35)
Tanel Kangert (EST)	11 March 1987 (age 39)
Andrey Kashechkin (KAZ)	21 March 1980 (age 46)
Fredrik Kessiakoff (SWE)	17 May 1980 (age 45)
Alexey Lutsenko (KAZ)	7 September 1992 (age 33)
Dimitry Muravyev (KAZ)	2 November 1979 (age 46)
Vincenzo Nibali (ITA)	14 November 1984 (age 41)
Simone Ponzi (ITA)	17 January 1987 (age 39)
Kevin Seeldraeyers (BEL)	12 September 1986 (age 39)
Egor Silin (RUS)	25 June 1988 (age 37)
Paolo Tiralongo (ITA)	8 July 1977 (age 48)
Ruslan Tleubayev (KAZ)	7 March 1987 (age 39)
Alessandro Vanotti (ITA)	16 September 1980 (age 45)
Andrey Zeits (KAZ)	14 December 1986 (age 39)

=== Belkin Pro Cycling ===
Rider	Date of birth
Jack Bobridge (AUS)	13 July 1989 (age 36)
Jetse Bol (NED)	8 September 1989 (age 36)
Lars Boom (NED)	30 December 1985 (age 40)
Theo Bos (NED)	22 August 1983 (age 42)
Graeme Brown (AUS)	9 April 1979 (age 47)
Stef Clement (NED)	24 September 1982 (age 43)
Rick Flens (NED)	11 April 1983 (age 43)
Juan Manuel Gárate (ESP)	24 April 1976 (age 49)
Robert Gesink (NED)	31 May 1986 (age 39)
Marc Goos (NED)	30 November 1990 (age 35)
Moreno Hofland (NED)	31 August 1991 (age 34)
Wilco Kelderman (NED)	25 March 1991 (age 35)
Steven Kruijswijk (NED)	7 June 1987 (age 38)
Tom Leezer (NED)	26 December 1985 (age 40)
Paul Martens (GER)	26 October 1983 (age 42)

Rider	Date of birth
Bauke Mollema (NED)	26 November 1986 (age 39)
Lars Petter Nordhaug (NOR)	14 May 1984 (age 41)
Mark Renshaw (AUS)	22 October 1982 (age 43)
Luis León Sánchez (ESP)	24 November 1983 (age 42)
Tom-Jelte Slagter (NED)	1 July 1989 (age 36)
Ivar Slik (Note: Slik joined the team on 15 August as a stagiaire, from the Rabobank Development Team.) (NED)	27 May 1993 (age 32)
Bram Tankink (NED)	3 December 1978 (age 47)
David Tanner (AUS)	30 September 1984 (age 41)
Laurens ten Dam (NED)	13 November 1980 (age 45)
Maarten Tjallingii (NED)	5 November 1977 (age 48)
Jos van Emden (NED)	27 June 1987 (age 38)
Dennis van Winden (NED)	2 December 1987 (age 38)
Sep Vanmarcke (BEL)	28 July 1988 (age 37)
Robert Wagner (GER)	17 April 1983 (age 42)
Maarten Wynants (BEL)	13 May 1982 (age 43)

=== BMC Racing Team ===
Rider	Date of birth
Alessandro Ballan (ITA)	November 6, 1979 (aged 33)
Adam Blythe (GBR)	October 1, 1989 (aged 23)
Brent Bookwalter (USA)	February 16, 1984 (aged 28)
Marcus Burghardt (GER)	June 30, 1983 (aged 29)
Steve Cummings (GBR)	March 19, 1981 (aged 31)
Silvan Dillier (Note: Dillier joined the team on August 1 as a stagiaire, from the BMC Development Team.) (SUI)	August 3, 1990 (aged 22)
Yannick Eijssen (BEL)	June 26, 1989 (aged 23)
Cadel Evans (AUS)	February 14, 1977 (aged 35)
Mathias Frank (SUI)	December 9, 1986 (aged 26)
Philippe Gilbert (BEL)	July 5, 1982 (aged 30)
Thor Hushovd (NOR)	January 18, 1978 (aged 34)
Martin Kohler (SUI)	July 17, 1985 (aged 27)
Sebastian Lander (DEN)	March 11, 1991 (aged 21)
Klaas Lodewyck (BEL)	March 24, 1988 (aged 24)
Amaël Moinard (FRA)	February 2, 1982 (aged 30)

Rider	Date of birth
Steve Morabito (SUI)	January 30, 1983 (aged 29)
Dominik Nerz (GER)	August 25, 1989 (aged 23)
Jakub Novák (Note: Novák joined the team on August 1 as a stagiaire, from the BMC Development Team.) (CZE)	December 30, 1990 (aged 22)
Daniel Oss (ITA)	January 13, 1987 (aged 25)
Taylor Phinney (USA)	June 27, 1990 (aged 22)
Marco Pinotti (ITA)	February 25, 1976 (aged 36)
Manuel Quinziato (ITA)	October 30, 1979 (aged 33)
Ivan Santaromita (ITA)	April 30, 1984 (aged 28)
Michael Schär (SUI)	September 29, 1986 (aged 26)
Julien Taramarcaz (Note: Taramarcaz joined the team on August 1 as a stagiaire, from the BMC Mountainbike Racing Team.) (SUI)	November 12, 1987 (aged 25)
Greg Van Avermaet (BEL)	May 17, 1985 (aged 27)
Tejay van Garderen (USA)	August 12, 1988 (aged 24)
Larry Warbasse (USA)	June 28, 1990 (aged 22)
Danilo Wyss (SUI)	August 26, 1985 (aged 27)

=== Cannondale ===
Rider	Date of birth
Stefano Agostini (Note: Agostini was sacked by the team in August 2013, after recording an adverse analytical finding for clostebol in an out-of-competition test.) (ITA)	3 January 1989 (aged 23)
Ivan Basso (ITA)	26 November 1977 (aged 35)
Maciej Bodnar (POL)	7 March 1985 (aged 27)
Guillaume Boivin (CAN)	25 September 1989 (aged 23)
Federico Canuti (ITA)	30 August 1985 (aged 27)
Damiano Caruso (ITA)	12 October 1987 (aged 25)
Mauro Da Dalto (ITA)	8 April 1981 (aged 31)
Tiziano Dall'Antonia (ITA)	26 July 1983 (aged 29)
Alessandro De Marchi (ITA)	19 May 1986 (aged 26)
Lucas Sebastián Haedo (ARG)	18 April 1983 (aged 29)
Ted King (USA)	31 January 1983 (aged 29)
Michel Koch (GER)	15 October 1991 (aged 21)
Kristijan Koren (SLO)	25 November 1986 (aged 26)
Matthias Krizek (AUT)	29 September 1988 (aged 24)
Paolo Longo Borghini (ITA)	10 December 1980 (aged 32)

Rider	Date of birth
Alan Marangoni (ITA)	16 July 1984 (aged 28)
Nicolò Martinello (Note: Martinello joined the team on 1 August as a stagiaire, from Union Raiffeisen Radteam Tirol.) (ITA)	1 November 1989 (aged 23)
Nariyuki Masuda (JPN)	23 October 1983 (aged 29)
Moreno Moser (ITA)	25 December 1990 (aged 22)
Maciej Paterski (POL)	12 September 1986 (aged 26)
Daniele Ratto (ITA)	5 October 1989 (aged 23)
Fabio Sabatini (ITA)	18 February 1985 (aged 27)
Juraj Sagan (SVK)	23 December 1988 (aged 24)
Peter Sagan (SVK)	26 January 1990 (aged 22)
Cristiano Salerno (ITA)	18 February 1985 (aged 27)
Cayetano Sarmiento (COL)	28 March 1987 (aged 25)
Brian Vandborg (DEN)	4 December 1981 (aged 31)
Davide Villella (Note: Villella joined the team on 1 August as a stagiaire, from Team Colpack.) (ITA)	27 June 1991 (aged 21)
Elia Viviani (ITA)	7 February 1989 (aged 23)
Cameron Wurf (AUS)	3 August 1983 (aged 29)

=== Euskaltel–Euskadi ===
Rider	Date of birth
Jon Aberasturi (ESP)	28 March 1989 (aged 23)
Igor Antón (ESP)	2 March 1983 (aged 29)
Mikel Astarloza (ESP)	17 November 1979 (aged 33)
Jorge Azanza (ESP)	16 June 1982 (aged 30)
Pello Bilbao (ESP)	27 February 1990 (aged 22)
Garikoitz Bravo (ESP)	31 July 1989 (aged 23)
Tarik Chaoufi (Note: Chaoufi left the team on 13 August.) (MAR)	26 February 1986 (aged 26)
Ricardo García (ESP)	26 February 1988 (aged 24)
Gorka Izagirre (ESP)	7 October 1987 (aged 25)
Ion Izagirre (ESP)	4 February 1989 (aged 23)
Jure Kocjan (SLO)	18 October 1984 (aged 28)
Mikel Landa (ESP)	13 December 1989 (aged 23)
Juan José Lobato (ESP)	29 December 1988 (aged 24)
Egoi Martínez (ESP)	15 May 1978 (aged 34)
Ricardo Mestre (POR)	11 September 1983 (aged 29)

Rider	Date of birth
Miguel Mínguez (ESP)	30 August 1988 (aged 24)
Mikel Nieve (ESP)	26 May 1984 (aged 28)
Juan José Oroz (ESP)	7 November 1980 (aged 32)
Rubén Pérez (ESP)	30 October 1981 (aged 31)
Steffen Radochla (GER)	19 October 1978 (aged 34)
Adrián Sáez (ESP)	17 March 1986 (aged 26)
Samuel Sánchez (ESP)	5 February 1978 (aged 34)
André Schulze (GER)	21 November 1974 (aged 38)
Alexander Serebryakov (Note: Serebryakov was suspended from the team on 6 April, adverse analytical finding in an out-of-competition drugs test in March. He was later sacked.) (RUS)	25 September 1987 (aged 25)
Romain Sicard (FRA)	1 January 1988 (aged 25)
Ioannis Tamouridis (GRE)	3 June 1980 (aged 32)
Pablo Urtasun (ESP)	29 March 1980 (aged 32)
Gorka Verdugo (ESP)	4 November 1978 (aged 34)
Robert Vrečer (SLO)	8 October 1980 (aged 32)

=== FDJ.fr ===
Rider	Date of birth
William Bonnet (FRA)	25 June 1982 (aged 30)
David Boucher (BEL)	17 March 1980 (aged 32)
Nacer Bouhanni (FRA)	25 July 1990 (aged 22)
Sandy Casar (FRA)	2 February 1979 (aged 33)
Arnaud Courteille (FRA)	13 March 1989 (aged 23)
Mickaël Delage (FRA)	6 August 1985 (aged 27)
Arnaud Démare (FRA)	26 August 1991 (aged 21)
Kenny Elissonde (FRA)	22 July 1991 (aged 21)
Pierrick Fédrigo (FRA)	30 November 1978 (aged 34)
Murilo Fischer (BRA)	16 June 1979 (aged 33)
Alexandre Geniez (FRA)	16 April 1988 (aged 24)
Anthony Geslin (FRA)	9 June 1980 (aged 32)
Alexis Guérin (Note: Guérin joined the team on 1 August as a stagiaire, from the Entente Sud Gascogne team.) (FRA)	6 June 1992 (aged 20)
Arnold Jeannesson (FRA)	15 January 1986 (aged 26)
Mathieu Ladagnous (FRA)	12 December 1984 (aged 28)
Johan Le Bon (FRA)	3 October 1990 (aged 22)

Rider	Date of birth
Olivier Le Gac (Note: Le Gac joined the team on 1 August as a stagiaire, from the Brest Iroise Cyclisme 2000 team.) (FRA)	27 August 1993 (aged 19)
Laurent Mangel (FRA)	22 May 1981 (aged 31)
Francis Mourey (FRA)	8 December 1980 (aged 32)
Yoann Offredo (FRA)	12 November 1986 (aged 26)
Laurent Pichon (FRA)	19 July 1986 (aged 26)
Cédric Pineau (FRA)	8 May 1985 (aged 27)
Thibaut Pinot (FRA)	29 May 1990 (aged 22)
Benoît Poitevin (Note: Poitevin joined the team on 1 August as a stagiaire, from UC Nantes.) (FRA)	5 May 1991 (aged 21)
Dominique Rollin (CAN)	29 October 1982 (aged 30)
Anthony Roux (FRA)	18 April 1987 (aged 25)
Jérémy Roy (FRA)	22 June 1983 (aged 29)
Geoffrey Soupe (FRA)	22 March 1988 (aged 24)
Benoît Vaugrenard (FRA)	5 January 1982 (aged 30)
Jussi Veikkanen (FIN)	29 March 1981 (aged 31)
Arthur Vichot (FRA)	26 November 1988 (aged 24)
Émilien Viennet (FRA)	6 February 1992 (aged 20)

=== Garmin–Sharp ===
Rider	Date of birth
Jack Bauer (NZL)	April 7, 1985 (aged 27)
Tom Danielson (USA)	March 13, 1978 (aged 34)
Thomas Dekker (NED)	September 6, 1984 (aged 28)
Rohan Dennis (AUS)	May 28, 1990 (aged 22)
Caleb Fairly (USA)	February 19, 1987 (aged 25)
Tyler Farrar (USA)	June 2, 1984 (aged 28)
Koldo Fernández (ESP)	September 13, 1981 (aged 31)
Nathan Haas (AUS)	March 12, 1989 (aged 23)
Ryder Hesjedal (CAN)	December 9, 1980 (aged 32)
Alex Howes (USA)	January 1, 1988 (aged 25)
Robert Hunter (RSA)	April 22, 1977 (aged 35)
Andreas Klier (Note: Klier announced his retirement from professional cycling on May 13.) (GER)	January 15, 1976 (aged 36)
Michel Kreder (NED)	August 15, 1987 (aged 25)
Raymond Kreder (NED)	November 26, 1989 (aged 23)
Martijn Maaskant (NED)	July 27, 1983 (aged 29)
Dan Martin (IRE)	August 20, 1986 (aged 26)

Rider	Date of birth
David Millar (GBR)	January 4, 1977 (aged 35)
Lachlan Morton (AUS)	January 2, 1992 (aged 20)
Ramūnas Navardauskas (LTU)	January 30, 1988 (aged 24)
Nick Nuyens (BEL)	May 5, 1980 (aged 32)
Glenn O'Shea (Note: O'Shea joined the team on August 28 as a stagiaire, from the An Post–Chain Reaction team.) (AUS)	June 14, 1989 (aged 23)
Alex Rasmussen (Note: Rasmussen rejoined the team on March 16, upon the completion of an 18-month ban.) (DEN)	June 9, 1984 (aged 28)
Jacob Rathe (USA)	March 13, 1991 (aged 21)
Sébastien Rosseler (BEL)	July 15, 1981 (aged 31)
Peter Stetina (USA)	August 8, 1987 (aged 25)
Andrew Talansky (USA)	November 23, 1988 (aged 24)
Christian Vande Velde (USA)	May 22, 1976 (aged 36)
Johan Vansummeren (BEL)	February 4, 1981 (aged 31)
Steele Von Hoff (AUS)	December 31, 1987 (aged 25)
Fabian Wegmann (GER)	June 20, 1980 (aged 32)
David Zabriskie (USA)	January 12, 1979 (aged 33)

=== Team Katusha ===
Rider	Date of birth
Mikhail Antonov (Note: Antonov joined the team on 1 August as a stagiaire, from Itera–Katusha.) (RUS)	4 January 1986 (aged 26)
Maxim Belkov (RUS)	9 January 1985 (aged 27)
Pavel Brutt (RUS)	29 January 1982 (aged 30)
Giampaolo Caruso (ITA)	15 August 1980 (aged 32)
Sergey Chernetskiy (RUS)	9 April 1990 (aged 22)
Xavier Florencio (ESP)	26 December 1979 (aged 33)
Vladimir Gusev (RUS)	4 July 1982 (aged 30)
Marco Haller (AUT)	1 April 1991 (aged 21)
Petr Ignatenko (RUS)	27 September 1987 (aged 25)
Mikhail Ignatiev (RUS)	7 May 1985 (aged 27)
Vladimir Isaichev (RUS)	26 April 1986 (aged 26)
Alexandr Kolobnev (RUS)	4 May 1981 (aged 31)
Dmitry Kozonchuk (RUS)	5 April 1984 (aged 28)
Alexander Kristoff (NOR)	5 July 1987 (aged 25)
Timofey Kritsky (RUS)	24 January 1987 (aged 25)
Aleksandr Kuschynski (BLR)	27 October 1979 (aged 33)
Vyacheslav Kuznetsov (RUS)	24 June 1989 (aged 23)

Rider	Date of birth
Alberto Losada (ESP)	28 February 1982 (aged 30)
Denis Menchov (Note: Menchov retired from professional cycling on 19 May.) (RUS)	25 January 1978 (aged 34)
Daniel Moreno (ESP)	5 September 1981 (aged 31)
Sergey Nikolaev (Note: Nikolaev joined the team on 1 August as a stagiaire, from Itera–Katusha.) (RUS)	5 February 1988 (aged 24)
Luca Paolini (ITA)	17 January 1977 (aged 35)
Alexander Porsev (RUS)	21 February 1986 (aged 26)
Maxim Razumov (Note: Razumov joined the team on 1 August as a stagiaire, from Itera–Katusha.) (RUS)	12 April 1990 (aged 22)
Joaquim Rodríguez (ESP)	12 May 1979 (aged 33)
Rüdiger Selig (GER)	19 February 1989 (aged 23)
Gatis Smukulis (LAT)	15 April 1987 (aged 25)
Simon Špilak (SLO)	23 June 1986 (aged 26)
Yuri Trofimov (RUS)	26 January 1984 (aged 28)
Alexey Tsatevich (RUS)	5 July 1989 (aged 23)
Ángel Vicioso (ESP)	13 April 1977 (aged 35)
Eduard Vorganov (RUS)	1 December 1982 (aged 30)
Anton Vorobyev (RUS)	12 October 1990 (aged 22)

=== Lampre–Merida ===
Rider	Date of birth
Winner Anacona (COL)	11 August 1988 (aged 24)
Niccolò Bonifazio (Note: Bonifazio joined the team on 1 August as a stagiaire, from the G.S.C. Viris Vigevano team.) (ITA)	29 October 1993 (aged 19)
Matteo Bono (ITA)	11 November 1983 (aged 29)
Enea Cambianica (Note: Cambianica joined the team on 1 August as a stagiaire, from the Maca Loca Team.) (SUI)	21 November 1989 (aged 23)
Mattia Cattaneo (ITA)	25 October 1990 (aged 22)
Davide Cimolai (ITA)	13 August 1989 (aged 23)
Valerio Conti (Note: Conti joined the team on 1 August as a stagiaire, from the Mastromarco squad.) (ITA)	30 March 1993 (aged 19)
Damiano Cunego (ITA)	19 September 1981 (aged 31)
Luca Dodi (ITA)	26 May 1987 (aged 25)
Kristijan Đurasek (CRO)	26 July 1987 (aged 25)
Elia Favilli (ITA)	31 January 1989 (aged 23)
Roberto Ferrari (ITA)	9 March 1983 (aged 29)
Massimo Graziato (ITA)	25 September 1988 (aged 24)
Matthew Lloyd (AUS)	24 May 1983 (aged 29)
Adriano Malori (ITA)	28 January 1988 (aged 24)

Rider	Date of birth
Manuele Mori (ITA)	9 August 1980 (aged 32)
Przemysław Niemiec (POL)	11 April 1980 (aged 32)
Andrea Palini (ITA)	16 June 1989 (aged 23)
Alessandro Petacchi (Note: Petacchi retired from professional cycling on 23 April.) (ITA)	3 January 1974 (aged 38)
Daniele Pietropolli (ITA)	11 July 1980 (aged 32)
Jan Polanc (Note: Polanc joined the team on 1 August, from the Radenska squad.) (SLO)	6 May 1992 (aged 20)
Filippo Pozzato (ITA)	10 September 1981 (aged 31)
Maximiliano Richeze (ARG)	7 March 1983 (aged 29)
Michele Scarponi (ITA)	25 September 1979 (aged 33)
José Serpa (COL)	17 April 1979 (aged 33)
Simone Stortoni (ITA)	7 July 1985 (aged 27)
Miguel Ubeto (Note: Ubeto was provisionally suspended for an adverse finding of GW501516. He was later banned for two years.) (VEN)	2 September 1976 (aged 36)
Diego Ulissi (ITA)	15 July 1989 (aged 23)
Davide Viganò (ITA)	12 June 1984 (aged 28)
Luca Wackermann (ITA)	13 March 1992 (aged 20)

=== Lotto–Belisol ===
Rider	Date of birth
Lars Bak (DEN)	16 January 1980 (aged 32)
Dirk Bellemakers (NED)	19 January 1984 (aged 28)
Gaëtan Bille (BEL)	6 April 1988 (aged 24)
Stig Broeckx (Note: Broeckx joined the team on 1 August as a stagiaire, from the Lotto-Belisol U23 squad.) (BEL)	10 May 1990 (aged 22)
Brian Bulgaç (NED)	7 April 1988 (aged 24)
Jorne Carolus (Note: Carolus joined the team on 1 August as a stagiaire, from the Lotto-Belisol U23 squad.) (BEL)	22 February 1992 (aged 20)
Sander Cordeel (BEL)	7 November 1987 (aged 25)
Bart De Clercq (BEL)	26 August 1986 (aged 26)
Francis De Greef (BEL)	2 February 1985 (aged 27)
Jens Debusschere (BEL)	28 August 1989 (aged 23)
Kenny Dehaes (BEL)	10 November 1984 (aged 28)
Gert Dockx (BEL)	4 July 1988 (aged 24)
André Greipel (GER)	16 July 1982 (aged 30)
Adam Hansen (AUS)	11 May 1981 (aged 31)
Greg Henderson (NZL)	10 September 1976 (aged 36)

Rider	Date of birth
Olivier Kaisen (BEL)	30 April 1983 (aged 29)
Maarten Neyens (BEL)	24 May 1983 (aged 29)
Vicente Reynés (ESP)	31 July 1981 (aged 31)
Fréderique Robert (BEL)	25 January 1989 (aged 23)
Jürgen Roelandts (BEL)	2 July 1985 (aged 27)
Marcel Sieberg (GER)	30 April 1982 (aged 30)
Jurgen Van de Walle (BEL)	9 February 1977 (aged 35)
Jurgen Van den Broeck (BEL)	1 February 1983 (aged 29)
Tosh Van der Sande (BEL)	28 November 1990 (aged 22)
Joost van Leijen (NED)	20 July 1984 (aged 28)
Dennis Vanendert (BEL)	27 June 1988 (aged 24)
Jelle Vanendert (BEL)	19 February 1985 (aged 27)
Jonas van Genechten (BEL)	16 September 1986 (aged 26)
Tim Wellens (BEL)	10 May 1991 (aged 21)
Frederik Willems (BEL)	8 September 1979 (aged 33)

=== Movistar Team ===
Rider	Date of birth
Andrey Amador (CRC)	29 August 1986 (age 39)
Eros Capecchi (ITA)	13 June 1986 (age 39)
Jonathan Castroviejo (ESP)	27 April 1987 (age 38)
Juan José Cobo (ESP)	11 February 1981 (age 45)
Rui Costa (POR)	5 October 1986 (age 39)
Alex Dowsett (GBR)	3 October 1988 (age 37)
Imanol Erviti (ESP)	15 November 1983 (age 42)
Iván Gutiérrez (ESP)	27 November 1978 (age 47)
Jesús Herrada (ESP)	26 July 1990 (age 35)
José Herrada (ESP)	1 October 1985 (age 40)
Beñat Intxausti (ESP)	20 March 1986 (age 40)
Vladimir Karpets (RUS)	20 September 1980 (age 45)
Pablo Lastras (ESP)	20 January 1976 (age 50)

Rider	Date of birth
Ángel Madrazo (ESP)	30 July 1988 (age 37)
Javier Moreno (ESP)	18 July 1984 (age 41)
Argiro Ospina (COL)	3 September 1991 (age 34)
Rubén Plaza (ESP)	29 February 1980 (age 46)
Nairo Quintana (COL)	4 February 1990 (age 36)
José Joaquín Rojas (ESP)	8 June 1985 (age 40)
Enrique Sanz (ESP)	11 September 1989 (age 36)
Sylwester Szmyd (POL)	2 March 1978 (age 48)
Eloy Teruel (ESP)	20 November 1982 (age 43)
Alejandro Valverde (ESP)	25 April 1980 (age 45)
Francisco Ventoso (ESP)	6 May 1982 (age 43)
Giovanni Visconti (ITA)	13 January 1983 (age 43)

=== Omega Pharma–Quick-Step ===
Rider	Date of birth
Tom Boonen (BEL)	15 October 1980 (aged 32)
Gianluca Brambilla (ITA)	22 August 1987 (aged 25)
Mark Cavendish (GBR)	21 May 1985 (aged 27)
Sylvain Chavanel (FRA)	30 June 1979 (aged 33)
Kevin De Weert (BEL)	27 May 1982 (aged 30)
Dries Devenyns (BEL)	22 July 1983 (aged 29)
Andrew Fenn (GBR)	1 July 1990 (aged 22)
Michał Gołaś (POL)	29 September 1984 (aged 28)
Bert Grabsch (GER)	19 June 1975 (aged 37)
Iljo Keisse (BEL)	21 December 1982 (aged 30)
Michał Kwiatkowski (POL)	2 June 1990 (aged 22)
Nikolas Maes (BEL)	9 April 1986 (aged 26)
Tony Martin (GER)	23 April 1985 (aged 27)
Gianni Meersman (BEL)	5 December 1985 (aged 27)
Serge Pauwels (BEL)	23 November 1983 (aged 29)

Rider	Date of birth
Alessandro Petacchi (Note: Petacchi joined the team on 1 August, having left Lampre–Merida in April 2013.) (ITA)	3 January 1974 (aged 38)
Jérôme Pineau (FRA)	2 January 1980 (aged 32)
František Raboň (CZE)	26 September 1983 (aged 29)
Pieter Serry (BEL)	21 November 1988 (aged 24)
Gert Steegmans (BEL)	30 September 1980 (aged 32)
Zdeněk Štybar (CZE)	11 December 1985 (aged 27)
Niki Terpstra (NED)	18 May 1984 (aged 28)
Matteo Trentin (ITA)	2 August 1989 (aged 23)
Guillaume Van Keirsbulck (BEL)	14 February 1991 (aged 21)
Stijn Vandenbergh (BEL)	25 April 1984 (aged 28)
Kristof Vandewalle (BEL)	5 April 1985 (aged 27)
Martin Velits (SVK)	21 February 1985 (aged 27)
Peter Velits (SVK)	21 February 1985 (aged 27)
Julien Vermote (BEL)	26 July 1989 (aged 23)
Carlos Verona (ESP)	4 November 1992 (aged 20)

=== Orica–GreenEDGE ===
Rider	Date of birth
Michael Albasini (SUI)	20 December 1980 (aged 32)
Fumiyuki Beppu (JPN)	10 April 1983 (aged 29)
Sam Bewley (NZL)	22 July 1987 (aged 25)
Simon Clarke (AUS)	18 July 1986 (aged 26)
Baden Cooke (AUS)	12 October 1978 (aged 34)
Allan Davis (AUS)	27 July 1980 (aged 32)
Julian Dean (NZL)	28 January 1975 (aged 37)
Mitchell Docker (AUS)	2 October 1986 (aged 26)
Luke Durbridge (AUS)	9 April 1991 (aged 21)
Simon Gerrans (AUS)	16 May 1980 (aged 32)
Matthew Goss (AUS)	5 November 1986 (aged 26)
Michael Hepburn (AUS)	17 August 1991 (aged 21)
Leigh Howard (AUS)	18 October 1989 (aged 23)
Damien Howson (Note: Howson joined the team on 1 August as a stagiaire, from Team Jayco–AIS.) (AUS)	13 August 1992 (aged 20)
Daryl Impey (RSA)	6 December 1984 (aged 28)
Jiyong Kang (Note: Kang joined the team on 1 August as a stagiaire, from the Geumsan Insam Cello squad.) (KOR)	19 February 1988 (aged 24)

Rider	Date of birth
Jens Keukeleire (BEL)	23 November 1988 (aged 24)
Aidis Kruopis (LIT)	26 October 1986 (aged 26)
Brett Lancaster (AUS)	15 November 1979 (aged 33)
Sebastian Langeveld (NED)	17 January 1985 (aged 27)
Michael Matthews (AUS)	26 September 1990 (aged 22)
Christian Meier (CAN)	2 September 1985 (aged 27)
Cameron Meyer (AUS)	11 January 1988 (aged 24)
Travis Meyer (AUS)	8 June 1989 (aged 23)
Jens Mouris (NED)	12 March 1980 (aged 32)
Stuart O'Grady (Note: O'Grady retired from professional cycling on 22 July, having completed the Tour de France.) (AUS)	6 August 1973 (aged 39)
Wesley Sulzberger (AUS)	26 October 1986 (aged 26)
Daniel Teklehaimanot (ERI)	10 November 1988 (aged 24)
Svein Tuft (CAN)	19 May 1977 (aged 35)
Tomas Vaitkus (LTU)	4 February 1982 (aged 30)
Pieter Weening (NED)	5 April 1981 (aged 31)

=== RadioShack–Leopard ===
Rider	Date of birth
Jan Bakelants (BEL)	14 February 1986 (age 40)
George Bennett (NZL)	7 April 1990 (age 36)
Matthew Busche (USA)	9 May 1985 (age 40)
Fabian Cancellara (SUI)	18 March 1981 (age 45)
Stijn Devolder (BEL)	29 August 1979 (age 46)
Laurent Didier (LUX)	19 July 1984 (age 41)
Tony Gallopin (FRA)	24 May 1988 (age 37)
Ben Hermans (BEL)	8 June 1986 (age 39)
Danilo Hondo (GER)	4 January 1974 (age 52)
Chris Horner (USA)	10 November 1971 (age 54)
Markel Irizar (ESP)	5 February 1980 (age 46)
Bob Jungels (LUX)	22 September 1992 (age 33)
Ben King (USA)	22 March 1989 (age 37)
Robert Kišerlovski (CRO)	9 August 1986 (age 39)

Rider	Date of birth
Andreas Klöden (GER)	22 June 1975 (age 50)
Tiago Machado (POR)	18 October 1985 (age 40)
Maxime Monfort (BEL)	14 January 1983 (age 43)
Giacomo Nizzolo (ITA)	30 January 1989 (age 37)
Nelson Oliveira (POR)	6 March 1989 (age 37)
Yaroslav Popovych (UKR)	4 January 1980 (age 46)
Grégory Rast (SUI)	17 January 1980 (age 46)
Thomas Rohregger (AUT)	23 December 1982 (age 43)
Hayden Roulston (NZL)	10 January 1981 (age 45)
Andy Schleck (LUX)	10 June 1985 (age 40)
Jesse Sergent (NZL)	8 July 1988 (age 37)
Jens Voigt (GER)	17 September 1971 (age 54)
Haimar Zubeldia (ESP)	1 April 1977 (age 49)

=== Saxo–Tinkoff ===
Rider	Date of birth
Daniele Bennati (ITA)	24 September 1980 (age 45)
Manuele Boaro (ITA)	3 December 1987 (age 38)
Matti Breschel (DEN)	31 August 1984 (age 41)
Jonathan Cantwell (AUS)	8 January 1982 (age 44)
Mads Christensen (DEN)	6 April 1984 (age 42)
Alberto Contador (ESP)	6 December 1982 (age 43)
Timmy Duggan (USA)	14 November 1982 (age 43)
Jesper Hansen (Note: Hansen joined the team on 5 August as a stagiaire, from Team Cult Energy.) (DEN)	4 May 1991 (aged 21)
Jonas Aaen Jørgensen (DEN)	20 April 1986 (age 39)
Christopher Juul-Jensen (DEN)	6 July 1989 (age 36)
Roman Kreuziger (CZE)	6 May 1986 (age 39)
Karsten Kroon (NED)	29 January 1976 (age 50)
Marko Kump (SLO)	9 September 1988 (age 37)
Anders Lund (DEN)	14 February 1985 (age 41)
Rafał Majka (POL)	12 September 1989 (age 36)
Jay McCarthy (AUS)	8 September 1992 (age 33)

Rider	Date of birth
Takashi Miyazawa (JPN)	27 February 1978 (age 48)
Michael Mørkøv (DEN)	30 April 1985 (age 40)
Benjamín Noval (ESP)	23 January 1979 (age 47)
Sérgio Paulinho (POR)	26 March 1980 (age 46)
Evgeni Petrov (RUS)	25 May 1978 (age 47)
Bruno Pires (POR)	15 May 1981 (age 44)
Paweł Poljański (Note: Poljański joined the team on 1 August as a stagiaire, from Team Mocaiana.) (POL)	6 May 1990 (aged 22)
Jesús Hernández (ESP)	28 September 1981 (age 44)
Nicolas Roche (IRL)	3 July 1984 (age 41)
Michael Rogers (AUS)	20 December 1979 (age 46)
Chris Anker Sørensen (DEN)	5 September 1984 (age 41)
Nicki Sørensen (DEN)	14 May 1975 (age 50)
Rory Sutherland (AUS)	8 February 1982 (age 44)
Matteo Tosatto (ITA)	14 May 1974 (age 51)
Oliver Zaugg (SUI)	9 May 1981 (age 44)

=== Team Sky ===
Rider	Date of birth
Edvald Boasson Hagen (NOR)	17 May 1987 (age 38)
Ian Boswell (USA)	7 February 1991 (age 35)
Dario Cataldo (ITA)	17 March 1985 (age 41)
Joe Dombrowski (USA)	12 May 1991 (age 34)
Josh Edmondson (GBR)	6 July 1992 (age 33)
Bernhard Eisel (AUT)	17 February 1981 (age 45)
Chris Froome (GBR)	20 May 1985 (age 40)
Mathew Hayman (AUS)	20 April 1978 (age 47)
Sergio Henao (COL)	10 December 1987 (age 38)
Peter Kennaugh (GBR)	15 June 1989 (age 36)
Vasil Kiryienka (BLR)	28 June 1981 (age 44)
Christian Knees (GER)	5 March 1981 (age 45)
David López (ESP)	13 May 1981 (age 44)
Danny Pate (USA)	23 March 1979 (age 47)

Rider	Date of birth
Richie Porte (AUS)	30 January 1985 (age 41)
Salvatore Puccio (ITA)	31 August 1989 (age 36)
Gabriel Rasch (NOR)	8 April 1976 (age 50)
Luke Rowe (GBR)	10 March 1990 (age 36)
Kanstantsin Sivtsov (BLR)	9 August 1982 (age 43)
Ian Stannard (GBR)	25 May 1987 (age 38)
Chris Sutton (AUS)	10 September 1984 (age 41)
Ben Swift (GBR)	5 November 1987 (age 38)
Geraint Thomas (GBR)	25 May 1986 (age 39)
Jonathan Tiernan-Locke (GBR)	26 December 1984 (age 41)
Rigoberto Urán (COL)	26 January 1987 (age 39)
Bradley Wiggins (GBR)	28 April 1980 (age 45)
Xabier Zandio (ESP)	17 March 1977 (age 49)

=== Vacansoleil–DCM ===
Rider	Date of birth
Kris Boeckmans (BEL)	13 February 1987 (age 39)
Grega Bole (SLO)	13 August 1985 (age 40)
Thomas De Gendt (BEL)	6 November 1986 (age 39)
Romain Feillu (FRA)	16 April 1984 (age 41)
Juan Antonio Flecha (ESP)	17 September 1977 (age 48)
Johnny Hoogerland (NED)	13 May 1983 (age 42)
Martijn Keizer (NED)	25 March 1988 (age 38)
Wesley Kreder (NED)	4 November 1990 (age 35)
Sergey Lagutin (UZB)	14 January 1981 (age 45)
Maurits Lammertink (NED)	31 August 1990 (age 35)
Björn Leukemans (BEL)	1 July 1977 (age 48)
Pim Ligthart (NED)	16 June 1988 (age 37)
Bert-Jan Lindeman (NED)	16 June 1989 (age 36)
Marco Marcato (ITA)	11 February 1984 (age 42)

Rider	Date of birth
Tomasz Marczyński (POL)	6 March 1984 (age 42)
Barry Markus (NED)	17 July 1991 (age 34)
Wouter Mol (NED)	17 April 1982 (age 43)
Nikita Novikov (RUS)	10 November 1989 (age 36)
Rob Ruijgh (NED)	12 November 1986 (age 39)
José Rujano (Note: Rujano left the team on 24 June, later announcing his retirement from cycling.) (VEN)	18 February 1982 (age 44)
Mirko Selvaggi (ITA)	11 February 1985 (age 41)
Rafael Valls (ESP)	25 June 1987 (age 38)
Kenny van Hummel (NED)	30 September 1982 (age 43)
Boy van Poppel (NED)	18 January 1988 (age 38)
Danny van Poppel (NED)	26 July 1993 (age 32)
Frederik Veuchelen (BEL)	4 September 1978 (age 47)
Willem Wauters (BEL)	10 November 1989 (age 36)
Lieuwe Westra (NED)	11 September 1982 (age 43)

== See also ==
- 2013 in men's road cycling
- List of 2013 UCI Professional Continental and Continental teams
- List of 2013 UCI Women's Teams

Preceded by 2012	List of UCI ProTeams and riders 2013	Succeeded by 2014
