= 2013 Lotto–Belisol season =

2013 Lotto–Belisol season
| Manager | Marc Sergeant |
| One-day victories | 9 |
| Stage race overall victories | – |
| Stage race stage victories | 18 |
Previous season • Next season

The 2013 season for Lotto–Belisol began in January at the La Tropicale Amissa Bongo. As a UCI ProTeam, they were automatically invited and obligated to send a squad to every event in the UCI World Tour.

== 2013 roster ==
As of 1 January 2013.

| Rider | Date of birth |
|---|---|
| Lars Bak (DEN) | 16 January 1980 (aged 32) |
| Dirk Bellemakers (NED) | 19 January 1984 (aged 28) |
| Gaëtan Bille (BEL) | 6 April 1988 (aged 24) |
| Stig Broeckx (Note: Broeckx joined the team on 1 August as a stagiaire, from the Lotto-Belisol U23 squad.) (BEL) | 10 May 1990 (aged 22) |
| Brian Bulgaç (NED) | 7 April 1988 (aged 24) |
| Jorne Carolus (Note: Carolus joined the team on 1 August as a stagiaire, from the Lotto-Belisol U23 squad.) (BEL) | 22 February 1992 (aged 20) |
| Sander Cordeel (BEL) | 7 November 1987 (aged 25) |
| Bart De Clercq (BEL) | 26 August 1986 (aged 26) |
| Francis De Greef (BEL) | 2 February 1985 (aged 27) |
| Jens Debusschere (BEL) | 28 August 1989 (aged 23) |
| Kenny Dehaes (BEL) | 10 November 1984 (aged 28) |
| Gert Dockx (BEL) | 4 July 1988 (aged 24) |
| André Greipel (GER) | 16 July 1982 (aged 30) |
| Adam Hansen (AUS) | 11 May 1981 (aged 31) |
| Greg Henderson (NZL) | 10 September 1976 (aged 36) |

| Rider | Date of birth |
|---|---|
| Olivier Kaisen (BEL) | 30 April 1983 (aged 29) |
| Maarten Neyens (BEL) | 24 May 1983 (aged 29) |
| Vicente Reynés (ESP) | 31 July 1981 (aged 31) |
| Fréderique Robert (BEL) | 25 January 1989 (aged 23) |
| Jürgen Roelandts (BEL) | 2 July 1985 (aged 27) |
| Marcel Sieberg (GER) | 30 April 1982 (aged 30) |
| Jurgen Van de Walle (BEL) | 9 February 1977 (aged 35) |
| Jurgen Van den Broeck (BEL) | 1 February 1983 (aged 29) |
| Tosh Van der Sande (BEL) | 28 November 1990 (aged 22) |
| Joost van Leijen (NED) | 20 July 1984 (aged 28) |
| Dennis Vanendert (BEL) | 27 June 1988 (aged 24) |
| Jelle Vanendert (BEL) | 19 February 1985 (aged 27) |
| Jonas van Genechten (BEL) | 16 September 1986 (aged 26) |
| Tim Wellens (BEL) | 10 May 1991 (aged 21) |
| Frederik Willems (BEL) | 8 September 1979 (aged 33) |

Riders who joined the team for the 2013 season

| Rider | 2012 team |
|---|---|
| Dirk Bellemakers | Landbouwkrediet–Euphony |

Riders who left the team during or after the 2012 season

| Rider | 2013 team |
|---|---|
| Gianni Meersman | Omega Pharma–Quick-Step |
| Mehdi Sohrabi | Tabriz Petrochemical Team |

== Season victories ==
| Date | Race | Competition | Rider | Country | Location |
|---|---|---|---|---|---|
| 14 January | La Tropicale Amissa Bongo, Stage 1 | UCI Africa Tour | Fréderique Robert (BEL) | Cameroon | Ebolowa |
| 16 January | La Tropicale Amissa Bongo, Stage 3 | UCI Africa Tour | Gert Dockx (BEL) | Gabon | Bitam |
| 18 January | La Tropicale Amissa Bongo, Stage 5 | UCI Africa Tour | Fréderique Robert (BEL) | Gabon | Mouila |
| 20 January | La Tropicale Amissa Bongo, Stage 7 | UCI Africa Tour | Gert Dockx (BEL) | Gabon | Libreville |
| 20 January | La Tropicale Amissa Bongo, Teams classification | UCI Africa Tour | (Note: The riders on the squad were Dirk Bellemakers, Gaëtan Bille, Gert Dockx, Maarten Neyens, Vicente Reynès and Fréderique Robert) | Gabon | |
| 22 January | Tour Down Under, Stage 1 | UCI World Tour | André Greipel (GER) | Australia | Lobethal |
| 25 January | Tour Down Under, Stage 4 | UCI World Tour | André Greipel (GER) | Australia | Tanunda |
| 27 January | Tour Down Under, Stage 6 | UCI World Tour | André Greipel (GER) | Australia | Adelaide |
| 3 February | Trofeo Palma | UCI Europe Tour | Kenny Dehaes (BEL) | Spain | Palma |
| 6 February | Tour Méditerranéen, Stage 1 | UCI Europe Tour | André Greipel (GER) | France | Gruissan |
| 10 February | Tour Méditerranéen, Stage 5 | UCI Europe Tour | Jürgen Roelandts (BEL) | France | Grasse |
| 10 February | Tour Méditerranéen, Points classification | UCI Europe Tour | Jürgen Roelandts (BEL) | France | |
| 15 March | Handzame Classic | UCI Europe Tour | Kenny Dehaes (BEL) | Belgium | Handzame |
| 4 April | Grand Prix Pino Cerami | UCI Europe Tour | Jonas Vangenechten (BEL) | Belgium | Hainaut |
| 24 April | Tour of Turkey, Stage 4 | UCI Europe Tour | André Greipel (GER) | Turkey | Marmaris |
| 25 April | Tour of Turkey, Stage 5 | UCI Europe Tour | André Greipel (GER) | Turkey | Bodrum |
| 28 April | Tour of Turkey, Points classification | UCI Europe Tour | André Greipel (GER) | Turkey | |
| 10 May | Giro d'Italia, Stage 7 | UCI World Tour | Adam Hansen (AUS) | Italy | Pescara |
| 19 May | Glava Tour of Norway, Mountains classification | UCI Europe Tour | Sander Cordeel (BEL) | Norway | |
| 22 May | Tour of Belgium, Stage 1 | UCI Europe Tour | André Greipel (GER) | Belgium | Knokke-Heist |
| 23 May | Tour of Belgium, Stage 2 | UCI Europe Tour | André Greipel (GER) | Belgium | Ninove |
| 26 May | Tour of Belgium, Points classification | UCI Europe Tour | André Greipel (GER) | Belgium | |
| 2 June | Ronde van Zeeland Seaports | UCI Europe Tour | André Greipel (GER) | Netherlands | Terneuzen |
| 16 June | Ster ZLM Toer, Points classification | UCI Europe Tour | André Greipel (GER) | Netherlands | |
| 19 June | Halle–Ingooigem | UCI Europe Tour | Kenny Dehaes (BEL) | Belgium | Ingooigem |
| 4 July | Tour de France, Stage 6 | UCI World Tour | André Greipel (GER) | France | Montpellier |
| 23 July | Tour de Wallonie, Stage 4 | UCI Europe Tour | Kenny Dehaes (BEL) | Belgium | Clabecq |
| 15 August | Eneco Tour, Stage 4 | UCI World Tour | André Greipel (GER) | Netherlands | Vlijmen |
| 31 August | World Ports Classic, Young rider classification | UCI Europe Tour | Stig Broeckx (BEL) (Note: Broeckx won the classification, as a stagiaire.) | (Note: Race held in Belgium and the Netherlands.) | |
| 31 August | World Ports Classic, Teams classification | UCI Europe Tour | (Note: The riders on the squad were André Greipel, Lars Bak, Stig Broeckx, Kenny Dehaes, Jens Debusschere, Fréderique Robert, Marcel Sieberg and Jonas Vangenechten) | | |
| 7 September | Brussels Cycling Classic | UCI Europe Tour | André Greipel (GER) | Belgium | Brussels |
| 20 September | Kampioenschap van Vlaanderen | UCI Europe Tour | Jens Debusschere (BEL) | Belgium | Koolskamp |
| 3 October | Tour de l'Eurometropole, Stage 1 | UCI Europe Tour | Jens Debusschere (BEL) | Belgium | Moorslede |
| 6 October | Tour de l'Eurometropole, Overall | UCI Europe Tour | Jens Debusschere (BEL) | Belgium | |
| 6 October | Tour de l'Eurometropole, Points classification | UCI Europe Tour | Jens Debusschere (BEL) | Belgium | |
| 6 October | Tour de l'Eurometropole, Young rider classification | UCI Europe Tour | Jens Debusschere (BEL) | Belgium | |
| 15 October | Nationale Sluitingsprijs | UCI Europe Tour | Jens Debusschere (BEL) | Belgium | Kapellen |
