= 2014 Lotto–Belisol season =

Lotto–Belisol
- 2014 season
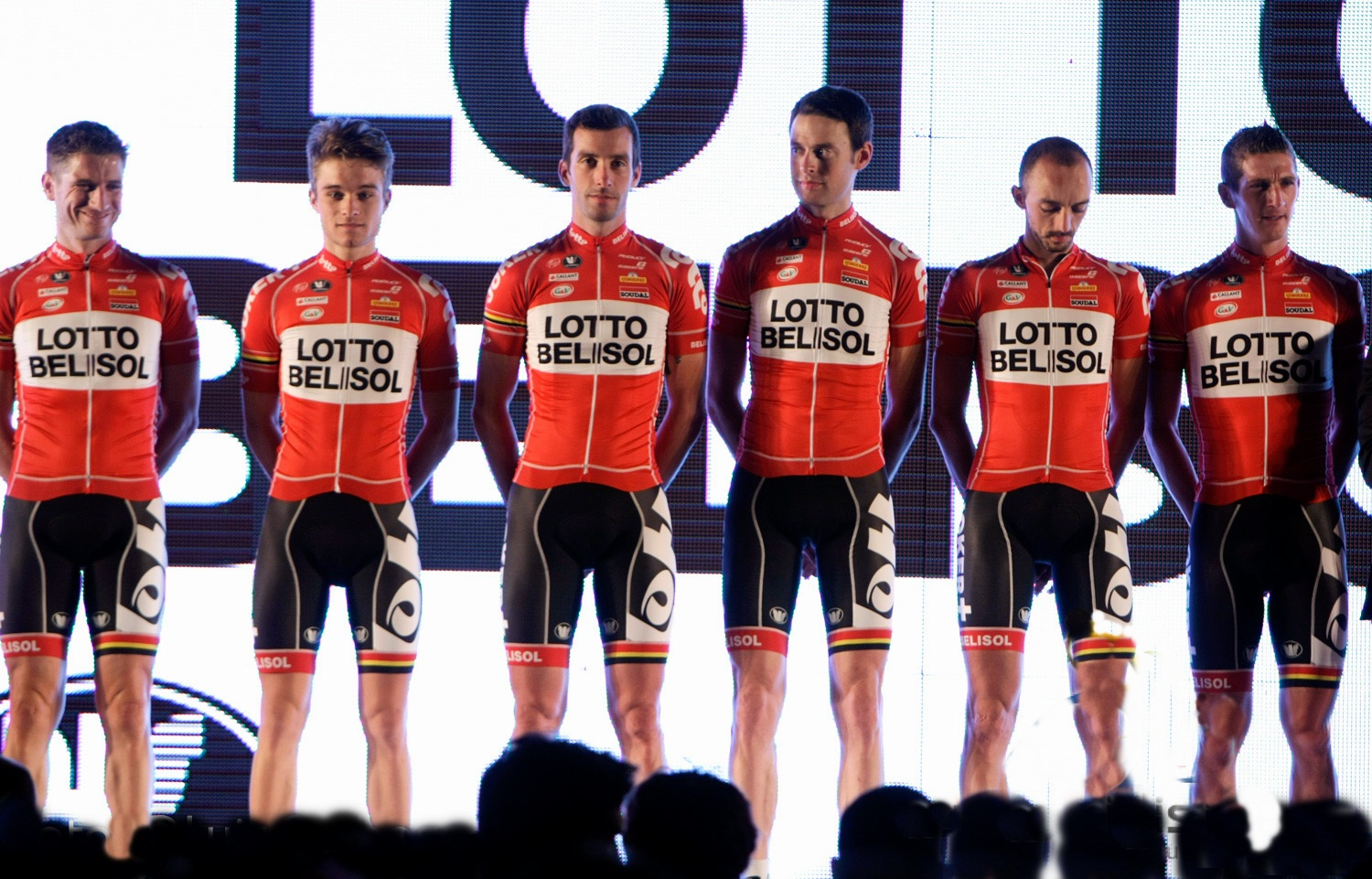
- Lotto Belisol-TdSL2014
- Manager: Marc Sergeant

Season victories
- One-day races: 8
- Stage race overall: 1
- Stage race stages: 18

The 2014 season for Lotto–Belisol began in January at the Tour de San Luis. As a UCI ProTeam, they were automatically invited and obligated to send a squad to every event in the UCI World Tour.

== 2014 roster ==
As of 15 February 2014.

Rider	Date of birth
Sander Armée (BEL)	10 December 1985 (aged 28)
Lars Bak (DEN)	16 January 1980 (aged 33)
Kris Boeckmans (BEL)	13 February 1987 (aged 26)
Vegard Breen (NOR)	8 February 1990 (aged 23)
Stig Broeckx (BEL)	10 May 1990 (aged 23)
Sean De Bie (BEL)	3 October 1991 (aged 22)
Bart De Clercq (BEL)	26 August 1986 (aged 27)
Jens Debusschere (BEL)	28 August 1989 (aged 24)
Kenny Dehaes (BEL)	10 November 1984 (aged 29)
Gert Dockx (BEL)	4 July 1988 (aged 25)
Tony Gallopin (FRA)	19 April 1988 (aged 25)
André Greipel (GER)	16 July 1982 (aged 31)
Adam Hansen (AUS)	11 May 1981 (aged 32)
Greg Henderson (NZL)	10 September 1976 (aged 37)

Rider	Date of birth
Olivier Kaisen (Note: Kaisen was forced to retire from the sport on 10 February, on medical advice.) (BEL)	30 April 1983 (aged 30)
Pim Ligthart (NED)	16 June 1988 (aged 25)
Maxime Monfort (BEL)	14 January 1983 (aged 30)
Jürgen Roelandts (BEL)	2 July 1985 (aged 28)
Marcel Sieberg (GER)	30 April 1982 (aged 31)
Boris Vallée (BEL)	3 June 1993 (aged 20)
Jurgen Van den Broeck (BEL)	1 February 1983 (aged 30)
Tosh Van der Sande (BEL)	28 November 1990 (aged 23)
Dennis Vanendert (BEL)	27 June 1988 (aged 25)
Jelle Vanendert (BEL)	19 February 1985 (aged 28)
Jonas van Genechten (BEL)	16 September 1986 (aged 27)
Tim Wellens (BEL)	10 May 1991 (aged 22)
Frederik Willems (BEL)	8 September 1979 (aged 34)

Riders who joined the team for the 2014 season

Rider	2013 team
Sander Armée	Topsport Vlaanderen–Baloise
Kris Boeckmans	Vacansoleil–DCM
Vegard Breen	neo-pro (Joker–Merida)
Stig Broeckx	neo-pro (stagiaire; Lotto–Belisol)
Sean De Bie	neo-pro (Leopard–Trek Continental Team)
Tony Gallopin	RadioShack–Leopard
Pim Ligthart	Vacansoleil–DCM
Maxime Monfort	RadioShack–Leopard
Boris Vallée	neo-pro (ColorCode-Biowanze)

Riders who left the team during or after the 2013 season

Rider	2014 team
Dirk Bellemakers	Retired
Gaëtan Bille	Verandas Willems
Brian Bulgaç	Parkhotel Valkenburg Continental Team
Sander Cordeel	Vastgoedservice–Golden Palace
Francis De Greef	Wanty–Groupe Gobert
Maarten Neyens	
Vicente Reynés	IAM Cycling
Fréderique Robert	Wanty–Groupe Gobert
Jurgen Van de Walle	Retired
Joost van Leijen	Retired

== Season victories ==
Date	Race	Competition	Rider	Country	Location
24 January	Tour Down Under, Stage 4	UCI World Tour	André Greipel (GER)	Australia	Victor Harbor
26 January	Tour Down Under, Stage 6	UCI World Tour	André Greipel (GER)	Australia	Adelaide
26 January	Tour Down Under, Mountains classification	UCI World Tour	Adam Hansen (AUS)	Australia	
13 February	Tour of Qatar, Stage 5	UCI Asia Tour	André Greipel (GER)	Qatar	Madinat ash Shamal
18 February	Tour of Oman, Stage 1	UCI Asia Tour	André Greipel (GER)	Oman	Naseem Garden
20 February	Tour of Oman, Stage 3	UCI Asia Tour	André Greipel (GER)	Oman	Al-Bustan
23 February	Tour of Oman, Stage 6	UCI Asia Tour	André Greipel (GER)	Oman	Matrah Corniche
23 February	Tour of Oman, Points classification	UCI Asia Tour	André Greipel (GER)	Oman	
15 March	Ronde van Drenthe	UCI Europe Tour	Kenny Dehaes (BEL)	Netherlands	Hoogeveen
16 March	Paris–Nice, Mountains classification	UCI World Tour	Pim Ligthart (NED)	France	
19 March	Nokere Koerse	UCI Europe Tour	Kenny Dehaes (BEL)	Belgium	Nokere
24 May	World Ports Classic, Stage 1	UCI Europe Tour	André Greipel (GER)	Belgium	Antwerp
31 May	Tour of Belgium, Stage 4	UCI Europe Tour	André Greipel (GER)	Belgium	Eau d'Heure lakes
5 June	Tour de Luxembourg, Stage 1	UCI Europe Tour	André Greipel (GER)	Luxembourg	Hesperange
8 June	Tour de Luxembourg, Stage 4	UCI Europe Tour	André Greipel (GER)	Luxembourg	Luxembourg
20 June	Ster ZLM Toer, Stage 3	UCI Europe Tour	Greg Henderson (NZL)	Netherlands	Buchten
23 June	Ster ZLM Toer, Stage 5	UCI Europe Tour	André Greipel (GER)	Netherlands	Boxtel
10 July	Tour de France, Stage 6	UCI World Tour	André Greipel (GER)	France	Reims
16 July	Tour de France, Stage 11	UCI World Tour	Tony Gallopin (FRA)	France	Oyonnax
26 July	Tour de Wallonie, Stage 1	UCI Europe Tour	Jens Debusschere (BEL)	Belgium	Tournai
6 August	Tour de Pologne, Stage 4	UCI World Tour	Jonas van Genechten (BEL)	Poland	Katowice
16 August	Eneco Tour, Stage 6	UCI World Tour	Tim Wellens (BEL)	Belgium	Aywaille
17 August	Eneco Tour, Overall	UCI World Tour	Tim Wellens (BEL)	Belgium; Netherlands	
27 August	Druivenkoers Overijse	UCI Europe Tour	Jonas van Genechten (BEL)	Belgium	Overijse
6 September	Brussels Cycling Classic	UCI Europe Tour	André Greipel (GER)	Belgium	Brussels
7 September	Grand Prix de Fourmies	UCI Europe Tour	Jonas van Genechten (BEL)	France	Fourmies
12 September	Vuelta a España, Stage 19	UCI World Tour	Adam Hansen (AUS)	Spain	Cangas do Morrazo
14 September	Grote Prijs Jef Scherens	UCI Europe Tour	André Greipel (GER)	Belgium	Leuven
3 October	Münsterland Giro	UCI Europe Tour	André Greipel (GER)	Germany	Münster
5 October	Tour de l'Eurométropole, Teams classification	UCI Europe Tour	(Note: The riders on the squad were Jens Debusschere, Vegard Breen, Sean De Bie, Tiesj Benoot, Kenny Dehaes, Xandro Meurisse, Sander Armée and Jonas van Genechten)	Belgium	
14 October	Nationale Sluitingsprijs	UCI Europe Tour	Jens Debusschere (BEL)	Belgium	Kapellen
