= 2012 Lotto–Belisol season =

2012 Lotto–Belisol season
Manager	Marc Sergeant
One-day victories	5
Stage race overall victories	1
Stage race stage victories	22
Previous season • Next season

The 2012 season for Lotto–Belisol began in January at the Tour Down Under. As a UCI ProTeam, they were automatically invited and obligated to send a squad to every event in the UCI World Tour.

At the end of the 2011 season, Lotto parted company with co-sponsors Omega Pharma after seven seasons together, before window manufacturer Belisol joined the team as co-sponsor for three seasons.

== 2012 roster ==
Ages as of 1 January 2012.

Rider	Date of birth
Lars Bak (DEN)	16 January 1980 (aged 31)
Gaëtan Bille (BEL)	6 April 1988 (aged 23)
Brian Bulgac (NED)	7 April 1988 (aged 23)
Sander Cordeel (BEL)	7 November 1987 (aged 24)
Bart De Clercq (BEL)	26 August 1986 (aged 25)
Francis De Greef (BEL)	2 February 1985 (aged 26)
Jens Debusschere (BEL)	28 August 1989 (aged 22)
Kenny Dehaes (BEL)	10 November 1984 (aged 27)
Gert Dockx (BEL)	4 July 1988 (aged 23)
André Greipel (GER)	16 July 1982 (aged 29)
Adam Hansen (AUS)	11 May 1981 (aged 30)
Greg Henderson (NZL)	10 September 1976 (aged 35)
Olivier Kaisen (BEL)	30 April 1983 (aged 28)
Gianni Meersman (BEL)	5 December 1985 (aged 26)
Maarten Neyens (BEL)	24 May 1983 (aged 28)

Rider	Date of birth
Vicente Reynès (ESP)	31 July 1981 (aged 30)
Fréderique Robert (BEL)	25 January 1989 (aged 22)
Jürgen Roelandts (BEL)	2 July 1985 (aged 26)
Marcel Sieberg (GER)	30 April 1982 (aged 29)
Mehdi Sohrabi (IRI)	12 October 1981 (aged 30)
Thomas Sprengers (Note: Sprengers joined the team on 1 August, as a stagiaire, from the Lotto-Belisol under-23 team.) (BEL)	5 February 1990 (aged 21)
Jurgen Van de Walle (BEL)	9 February 1977 (aged 34)
Jurgen Van den Broeck (BEL)	1 February 1983 (aged 28)
Tosh van der Sande (BEL)	28 November 1990 (aged 21)
Joost van Leijen (NED)	20 July 1984 (aged 27)
Dennis Vanendert (BEL)	27 June 1988 (aged 23)
Jelle Vanendert (BEL)	19 February 1985 (aged 26)
Jonas Vangenechten (BEL)	16 September 1986 (aged 25)
Tim Wellens (Note: Wellens joined the team on 1 July.) (BEL)	10 May 1991 (aged 20)
Frederik Willems (BEL)	8 September 1979 (aged 32)
Wouter Wippert (Note: Wippert joined the team on 1 August, as a stagiaire, from the Lotto-Belisol under-23 team.) (NED)	14 August 1990 (aged 21)

Riders who joined the team for the 2012 season

Rider	2011 team
Tosh van der Sande	neo-pro (Omega Pharma-Lotto development team)
Greg Henderson	Team Sky
Dennis Vanendert	neo-pro (Pistoiese-Cecchi Logistica)
Lars Bak	HTC–Highroad
Mehdi Sohrabi	Tabriz Petrochemical Cycling Team
Gaëtan Bille	Wallonie Bruxelles–Crédit Agricole
Jonas Vangenechten	Wallonie Bruxelles–Crédit Agricole
Brian Bulgac	neo-pro (Omega Pharma-Lotto development team)
Sander Cordeel	Colba-Mercury
Fréderique Robert	Quick-Step
Joost van Leijen	Vacansoleil–DCM
Gianni Meersman	FDJ

Riders who left the team during or after the 2011 season

Rider	2012 team
Matthew Lloyd	Lampre–ISD
Philippe Gilbert	BMC Racing Team
Klaas Lodewyck	BMC Racing Team
Adam Blythe	BMC Racing Team
Óscar Pujol	Azad University Cross Team
Mario Aerts	Retired
Jan Bakelants	RadioShack–Nissan
David Boucher	FDJ–BigMat
Sebastian Lang	Retired
Sven Vandousselaere	Topsport Vlaanderen–Mercator
Jussi Veikkanen	FDJ–BigMat

== Season victories ==
Date	Race	Competition	Rider	Country	Location
15 January	Cancer Council Helpline Classic	National event	André Greipel (GER)	Australia	Adelaide
17 January	Tour Down Under, Stage 1	UCI World Tour	André Greipel (GER)	Australia	Clare
19 January	Tour Down Under, Stage 3	UCI World Tour	André Greipel (GER)	Australia	Victor Harbor
22 January	Tour Down Under, Stage 6	UCI World Tour	André Greipel (GER)	Australia	Adelaide
14 February	Tour of Oman, Stage 1	UCI Asia Tour	André Greipel (GER)	Oman	Al Hauqain
15 February	Volta ao Algarve, Stage 1	UCI Europe Tour	Gianni Meersman (BEL)	Portugal	Albufeira
17 February	Tour of Oman, Stage 4	UCI Asia Tour	André Greipel (GER)	Oman	Al Wadi al Kabir
7 March	Paris–Nice, Stage 4	UCI World Tour	Gianni Meersman (BEL)	France	Rodez
29 March	Three Days of De Panne, Mountains classification	UCI Europe Tour	Tosh van der Sande (BEL)	Belgium	
5 April	Grand Prix Pino Cerami	UCI Europe Tour	Gaëtan Bille (BEL)	Belgium	Frameries
23 April	Presidential Cycling Tour of Turkey, Stage 2	UCI Europe Tour	André Greipel (GER)	Turkey	Antalya
17 May	Giro d'Italia, Stage 12	UCI World Tour	Lars Bak (DEN)	Italy	Sestri Levante
23 May	Tour of Belgium, Stage 1	UCI Europe Tour	André Greipel (GER)	Belgium	Buggenhout
24 May	Tour of Belgium, Stage 2	UCI Europe Tour	André Greipel (GER)	Belgium	Knokke-Heist
25 May	Tour of Belgium, Stage 3	UCI Europe Tour	André Greipel (GER)	Belgium	Beveren
27 May	Giro d'Italia, Premio della Fuga	UCI World Tour	Olivier Kaisen (BEL)	Italy	
27 May	Tour of Belgium, Points classification	UCI Europe Tour	André Greipel (GER)	Belgium	
31 May	Tour de Luxembourg, Stage 1	UCI Europe Tour	André Greipel (GER)	Luxembourg	Hesperange
1 June	Tour de Luxembourg, Stage 2	UCI Europe Tour	André Greipel (GER)	Luxembourg	Leudelange
3 June	Tour de Luxembourg, Stage 4	UCI Europe Tour	Jürgen Roelandts (BEL)	Luxembourg	Luxembourg City
3 June	Tour de Luxembourg, Points classification	UCI Europe Tour	André Greipel (GER)	Luxembourg	
10 June	ProRace Berlin	UCI Europe Tour	André Greipel (GER)	Germany	Berlin
15 June	Ster ZLM Toer, Stage 2	UCI Europe Tour	André Greipel (GER)	Netherlands	Nuth-Schimmert
17 June	Ster ZLM Toer, Teams classification	UCI Europe Tour	(Note: The riders on the squad were Lars Bak, Jens Debusschere, André Greipel, Adam Hansen, Greg Henderson, Jürgen Roelandts, Marcel Sieberg and Joost van Leijen)	(Note: Race held in Belgium and the Netherlands.)	
4 July	Tour de France, Stage 4	UCI World Tour	André Greipel (GER)	France	Rouen
5 July	Tour de France, Stage 5	UCI World Tour	André Greipel (GER)	France	Saint-Quentin
14 July	Tour de France, Stage 13	UCI World Tour	André Greipel (GER)	France	Cap d'Agde
22 August	Danmark Rundt, Stage 1	UCI Europe Tour	André Greipel (GER)	Denmark	Randers
23 August	Danmark Rundt, Stage 2	UCI Europe Tour	André Greipel (GER)	Denmark	Aarhus
9 September	Grand Prix de Fourmies	UCI Europe Tour	Lars Bak (DEN)	France	Fourmies
15 September	GP Impanis-Van Petegem	UCI Europe Tour	André Greipel (GER)	Belgium	Haacht
27 September	Tour de l'Eurometropole, Stage 1	UCI Europe Tour	Jürgen Roelandts (BEL)	Belgium	Menen
30 September	Tour de l'Eurometropole, Overall	UCI Europe Tour	Jürgen Roelandts (BEL)	Belgium	
30 September	Tour de l'Eurometropole, Points classification	UCI Europe Tour	Jürgen Roelandts (BEL)	Belgium	
30 September	Tour de l'Eurometropole, Teams classification	UCI Europe Tour	(Note: The riders on the squad were André Greipel, Kenny Dehaes, Brian Bulgaç, Mehdi Sohrabi, Maarten Neyens, Jürgen Roelandts, Wouter Wippert and Jens Debusschere)	Belgium	
