= 2016 Lotto–Soudal season =

Lotto–Soudal
- 2016 season
- UCI code: LTS
- Status: UCI WorldTeam
- Manager: Marc Sergeant
- Main sponsor(s): Soudal
- Based: Belgium
- Bicycles: Ridley
- Groupset: Campagnolo

Season victories
- One-day races: 4
- Stage race overall: 2
- Stage race stages: 13
- National Championships: 1

The 2016 season for the Lotto–Soudal cycling team began in January at the Tour Down Under. As a UCI WorldTeam, they were automatically invited and obligated to send a squad to every event in the UCI World Tour.

== Team roster ==
As of 29 March 2016

Rider	Date of birth
Sander Armée (BEL)	10 December 1985 (aged 30)
Lars Bak (DEN)	16 January 1980 (aged 36)
Tiesj Benoot (BEL)	11 March 1994 (aged 22)
Kris Boeckmans (BEL)	13 February 1987 (aged 29)
Stig Broeckx (BEL)	10 May 1990 (aged 25)
Sean De Bie (BEL)	3 October 1991 (aged 24)
Jasper De Buyst (BEL)	24 November 1993 (aged 22)
Bart De Clercq (BEL)	26 August 1986 (aged 29)
Thomas De Gendt (BEL)	6 November 1986 (aged 29)
Jens Debusschere (BEL)	28 August 1989 (aged 26)
Kevin Deltombe (Note: Deltombe joined the team on 1 August as a stagiaire, from Lotto–Soudal U23.) (BEL)	27 February 1994 (aged 22)
Gert Dockx (BEL)	4 July 1988 (aged 27)
Frederik Frison (BEL)	28 July 1992 (aged 23)
Tony Gallopin (FRA)	19 April 1988 (aged 27)
Michael Goolaerts (Note: Goolaerts joined the team on 1 August as a stagiaire, from Lotto–Soudal U23.) (BEL)	24 July 1995 (aged 20)

Rider	Date of birth
André Greipel (GER)	16 July 1982 (aged 33)
Adam Hansen (AUS)	11 May 1981 (aged 34)
Greg Henderson (NZL)	10 September 1976 (aged 39)
Pim Ligthart (NED)	16 June 1988 (aged 27)
Tomasz Marczyński (POL)	6 March 1984 (aged 32)
Maxime Monfort (BEL)	14 January 1983 (aged 33)
Jürgen Roelandts (BEL)	2 July 1985 (aged 30)
James Shaw (Note: Shaw joined the team on 1 August as a stagiaire, from Lotto–Soudal U23.) (GBR)	6 June 1996 (aged 19)
Marcel Sieberg (GER)	30 April 1982 (aged 33)
Rafael Valls (ESP)	27 June 1987 (aged 28)
Tosh Van der Sande (BEL)	28 November 1990 (aged 25)
Jelle Vanendert (BEL)	19 February 1985 (aged 31)
Louis Vervaeke (BEL)	6 November 1993 (aged 22)
Jelle Wallays (BEL)	11 May 1989 (aged 26)
Tim Wellens (BEL)	10 May 1991 (aged 24)

Rider	2015 team
Tomasz Marczyński	Torku Şekerspor
Rafael Valls	Lampre–Merida
Jelle Wallays	Topsport Vlaanderen–Baloise

Rider	2016 team
Vegard Breen	Fortuneo–Vital Concept
Kenny Dehaes	Wanty–Groupe Gobert
Boris Vallée	Fortuneo–Vital Concept
Jurgen Van den Broeck	Team Katusha
Dennis Vanendert	

== Season victories ==
Date	Race	Competition	Rider	Country	Location
28 January	Trofeo Felanitx-Ses Salines-Campos-Porreres	UCI Europe Tour	André Greipel (GER)	Spain	Mallorca
31 January	Trofeo Playa de Palma	UCI Europe Tour	André Greipel (GER)	Spain	Mallorca
21 February	Volta ao Algarve, Youth Classification	UCI Europe Tour	Tiesj Benoot (BEL)	Portugal	
6 March	Three Days of West Flanders, Overall	UCI Europe Tour	Sean De Bie (BEL)	Belgium	
6 March	Three Days of West Flanders, Youth classification	UCI Europe Tour	Sean De Bie (BEL)	Belgium	
6 March	Three Days of West Flanders, Teams classification	UCI Europe Tour	(Note: The riders on the squad were Jelle Wallays, Sean De Bie, Gert Dockx, Tosh Van der Sande, Louis Vervaeke, Sander Armée and Frederik Frison)	Belgium	
13 March	Paris–Nice, Stage 7	UCI World Tour	Tim Wellens (BEL)	France	Nice
23 March	Dwars door Vlaanderen	UCI Europe Tour	Jens Debusschere (BEL)	Belgium	Waregem
24 March	Volta a Catalunya, Stage 4	UCI World Tour	Thomas De Gendt (BEL)	Spain	Port Ainé
27 March	Volta a Catalunya, Mountains classification	UCI World Tour	Thomas De Gendt (BEL)	Spain	
26 April	Presidential Tour of Turkey, Stage 3	UCI Europe Tour	André Greipel (GER)	Turkey	Konya
1 May	Tour de Romandie, Mountains classification	UCI World Tour	Sander Armée (BEL)	Switzerland	
11 May	Giro d'Italia, Stage 5	UCI World Tour	André Greipel (GER)	Italy	Benevento
12 May	Giro d'Italia, Stage 6	UCI World Tour	Tim Wellens (BEL)	Italy	Roccaraso
13 May	Giro d'Italia, Stage 7	UCI World Tour	André Greipel (GER)	Italy	Foligno
19 May	Giro d'Italia, Stage 12	UCI World Tour	André Greipel (GER)	Italy	Bibione
2 June	Tour de Luxembourg, Stage 1	UCI Europe Tour	André Greipel (GER)	Luxembourg	Hesperange
14 July	Tour de France, Stage 12	UCI World Tour	Thomas De Gendt (BEL)	France	Mont Ventoux
16 July	Tour de Pologne, Stage 5	UCI World Tour	Tim Wellens (BEL)	Poland	Zakopane
18 July	Tour de Pologne, Overall	UCI World Tour	Tim Wellens (BEL)	Poland	
18 July	Tour de Pologne, Mountains classification	UCI World Tour	Tim Wellens (BEL)	Poland	
18 July	Tour de Pologne, Teams classification	UCI World Tour	(Note: The riders on the squad were Tiesj Benoot, Jasper De Buyst, Bart De Clercq, Sander Armée, Maxime Monfort, Rafael Valls, Louis Vervaeke and Tim Wellens)	Poland	
24 July	Tour de France, Stage 21	UCI World Tour	André Greipel (GER)	France	Paris
11 August	Tour de l'Ain, Stage 2	UCI Europe Tour	Tosh Van der Sande (BEL)	France	Montreal-la Cluse
13 August	Tour de l'Ain, Mountains classification	UCI Europe Tour	Bart De Clercq (BEL)	France	
4 September	Tour of Britain, Stage 1	UCI Europe Tour	André Greipel (GER)	United Kingdom	Castle Douglas
14 September	Grand Prix de Wallonie	UCI Europe Tour	Tony Gallopin (FRA)	Belgium	Namur

== National, Continental and World champions 2016 ==
Date	Discipline	Jersey	Rider	Country	Location
26 June	German National Road Race Champion		André Greipel (GER)	Germany	Erfurt
