= 2015 Lotto–Soudal season =

Lotto–Soudal
- 2015 season
- UCI code: LTS
- Status: UCI ProTeam
- Manager: Marc Sergeant
- Main sponsor(s): Belgian lottery & Soudal
- Based: Belgium
- Bicycles: Ridley
- Groupset: Campagnolo

Season victories
- One-day races: 9
- Stage race overall: 4
- Stage race stages: 26
- National Championships: 1

The 2015 season for Lotto–Soudal began in January at the Tour Down Under. As a UCI WorldTeam, they were automatically invited and obligated to send a squad to every event in the UCI World Tour.

On the final day of the 2014 Tour de France the team announced that they had secured new sponsorship for the team with Soudal. Soudal was founded in 1966 and produces a range of sealants, adhesives and foams. Soudal will become a co-naming sponsor for the next six seasons, ensuring the team continues until the 2020 season, the team name becoming Lotto Soudal. Lotto will continue to sponsor the team, as well as the women's team and under-23 team.

== Team roster ==
As of 1 January 2015

Rider	Date of birth
Sander Armée (BEL)	10 December 1985 (aged 29)
Lars Bak (DEN)	16 January 1980 (aged 34)
Tiesj Benoot (BEL)	11 March 1994 (aged 20)
Kris Boeckmans (BEL)	13 February 1987 (aged 27)
Vegard Breen (NOR)	8 February 1990 (aged 24)
Stig Broeckx (BEL)	10 May 1990 (aged 24)
Sean De Bie (BEL)	3 October 1991 (aged 23)
Jasper De Buyst (BEL)	24 November 1993 (aged 21)
Bart De Clercq (BEL)	26 August 1986 (aged 28)
Thomas De Gendt (BEL)	6 November 1986 (aged 28)
Jens Debusschere (BEL)	28 August 1989 (aged 25)
Kenny Dehaes (BEL)	10 November 1984 (aged 30)
Gert Dockx (BEL)	4 July 1988 (aged 26)
Tony Gallopin (FRA)	19 April 1988 (aged 26)

Rider	Date of birth
André Greipel (GER)	16 July 1982 (aged 32)
Adam Hansen (AUS)	11 May 1981 (aged 33)
Greg Henderson (NZL)	10 September 1976 (aged 38)
Pim Ligthart (NED)	16 June 1988 (aged 26)
Maxime Monfort (BEL)	14 January 1983 (aged 31)
Jürgen Roelandts (BEL)	2 July 1985 (aged 29)
Marcel Sieberg (GER)	30 April 1982 (aged 32)
Boris Vallée (BEL)	3 June 1993 (aged 21)
Jurgen Van den Broeck (BEL)	1 February 1983 (aged 31)
Tosh Van der Sande (BEL)	28 November 1990 (aged 24)
Dennis Vanendert (BEL)	27 June 1988 (aged 26)
Jelle Vanendert (BEL)	19 February 1985 (aged 29)
Louis Vervaeke (BEL)	6 November 1993 (aged 21)
Tim Wellens (BEL)	10 May 1991 (aged 23)

Riders who joined the team for the 2015 season

Rider	2014 team
Tiesj Benoot	neo-pro (Lotto-Belisol U23)
Jasper De Buyst	Topsport Vlaanderen–Baloise
Thomas De Gendt	Omega Pharma–Quick-Step

Riders who left the team during or after the 2014 season

Rider	2014 team
Olivier Kaisen	Retired
Jonas Vangenechten	IAM Cycling
Frederik Willems	Retired

== Season victories ==
Date	Race	Competition	Rider	Country	Location
1 February	Grand Prix d'Ouverture La Marseillaise	UCI Europe Tour	Pim Ligthart (NED)	France	Marseille
4 February	Étoile de Bessèges, Stage 1	UCI Europe Tour	Kris Boeckmans (BEL)	France	Beaucaire
7 February	Étoile de Bessèges, Stage 4	UCI Europe Tour	Tony Gallopin (FRA)	France	Laudun
18 February	Vuelta a Andalucía, Stage 1a	UCI Europe Tour	Pim Ligthart (NED)	Spain	Hinojos
22 February	Volta ao Algarve, Stage 5	UCI Europe Tour	André Greipel (GER)	Portugal	Vilamoura
4 March	Le Samyn	UCI Europe Tour	Kris Boeckmans (BEL)	Belgium	Dour
10 March	Paris–Nice, Stage 2	UCI World Tour	André Greipel (GER)	France	Saint-Amand-Montrond
12 March	Tirreno–Adriatico, Stage 2	UCI World Tour	Jens Debusschere (BEL)	Italy	Cascina
14 March	Paris–Nice, Stage 6	UCI World Tour	Tony Gallopin (FRA)	France	Nice
15 March	Paris–Nice, Mountains classification	UCI World Tour	Thomas De Gendt (BEL)	France	
18 March	Nokere Koerse	UCI Europe Tour	Kris Boeckmans (BEL)	Belgium	Nokere
2 April	Three Days of De Panne, Teams classification	UCI Europe Tour	(Note: The riders on the squad were Kris Boeckmans, Lars Bak, Sean De Bie, Jens Debusschere, Gert Dockx, André Greipel, Pim Ligthart and Boris Vallée)	Belgium	
11 April	Tour of the Basque Country, Sprints classification	UCI World Tour	Louis Vervaeke (BEL)	Spain	
29 April	Tour of Turkey, Stage 4	UCI Europe Tour	André Greipel (GER)	Turkey	Marmaris
14 May	Giro d'Italia, Stage 6	UCI World Tour	André Greipel (GER)	Italy	Castiglione della Pescaia
15 May	Tour de Picardie, Stage 1	UCI Europe Tour	Kris Boeckmans (BEL)	France	Tergnier
17 May	Tour de Picardie, Stage 3	UCI Europe Tour	Kris Boeckmans (BEL)	France	Mers-les-Bains
17 May	Tour de Picardie, Overall	UCI Europe Tour	Kris Boeckmans (BEL)	France	
24 May	World Ports Classic, Stage 2	UCI Europe Tour	Kris Boeckmans (BEL)	Netherlands	Rotterdam
24 May	World Ports Classic, Overall	UCI Europe Tour	Kris Boeckmans (BEL)	(Note: Race held in Belgium and the Netherlands.)	
24 May	World Ports Classic, Points classification	UCI Europe Tour	Kris Boeckmans (BEL)		
24 May	World Ports Classic, Teams classification	UCI Europe Tour	(Note: The riders on the squad were Jens Debusschere, Tiesj Benoot, Kris Boeckmans, Thomas De Gendt, Kenny Dehaes, Gert Dockx, Jürgen Roelandts and Marcel Sieberg)		
4 June	Tour de Luxembourg, Stage 1	UCI Europe Tour	André Greipel (GER)	Luxembourg	Clemency
6 June	Tour de Luxembourg, Stage 3	UCI Europe Tour	André Greipel (GER)	Luxembourg	Diekirch
7 June	Tour de Luxembourg, Stage 4	UCI Europe Tour	Sean De Bie (BEL)	Luxembourg	Luxembourg City
7 June	Tour de Luxembourg, Points classification	UCI Europe Tour	André Greipel (GER)	Luxembourg	
18 June	Ster ZLM Toer, Stage 1	UCI Europe Tour	André Greipel (GER)	Netherlands	Rosmalen
19 June	Ster ZLM Toer, Stage 2	UCI Europe Tour	André Greipel (GER)	Netherlands	Buchten
21 June	Ster ZLM Toer, Overall	UCI Europe Tour	André Greipel (GER)	Netherlands	
21 June	Ster ZLM Toer, Points classification	UCI Europe Tour	André Greipel (GER)	Netherlands	
21 June	Ster ZLM Toer, Teams classification	UCI Europe Tour	(Note: The riders on the squad were Lars Bak, Sean De Bie, Jens Debusschere, Dennis Vanendert, André Greipel, Adam Hansen, Greg Henderson and Marcel Sieberg)	Netherlands	
21 June	Tour de Suisse, Mountains classification	UCI World Tour	Thomas De Gendt (BEL) (Note: Retroactively awarded, following the expunging of the results previously achieved by Stefan Denifl.)	Switzerland	
5 July	Tour de France, Stage 2	UCI World Tour	André Greipel (GER)	Netherlands	Neeltje Jans
8 July	Tour de France, Stage 5	UCI World Tour	André Greipel (GER)	France	Amiens
19 July	Tour de France, Stage 15	UCI World Tour	André Greipel (GER)	France	Valence
26 July	Tour de France, Stage 21	UCI World Tour	André Greipel (GER)	France	Paris
6 August	Tour de Pologne, Stage 5	UCI World Tour	Bart De Clercq (BEL)	Poland	Zakopane
8 August	Tour de Pologne, Teams classification	UCI World Tour	(Note: The riders on the squad were Sander Armée, Kris Boeckmans, Vegard Breen, Jasper De Buyst, Bart De Clercq, Maxime Monfort, Jurgen Van den Broeck and Boris Vallée)	Poland	
11 August	Eneco Tour, Stage 2	UCI World Tour	André Greipel (GER)	Netherlands	Breda
15 August	Eneco Tour, Stage 6	UCI World Tour	Tim Wellens (BEL)	Belgium	Houffalize
16 August	Eneco Tour, Overall	UCI World Tour	Tim Wellens (BEL)		
16 August	Eneco Tour, Points classification	UCI World Tour	André Greipel (GER)		
16 August	Eneco Tour, Teams classification	UCI World Tour	(Note: The riders on the squad were Tim Wellens, Tiesj Benoot, Stig Broeckx, Jens Debusschere, André Greipel, Greg Henderson, Jürgen Roelandts and Marcel Sieberg)		
18 August	Grote Prijs Stad Zottegem	UCI Europe Tour	Kenny Dehaes (BEL)	Belgium	Zottegem
23 August	Vattenfall Cyclassics	UCI World Tour	André Greipel (GER)	Germany	Hamburg
12 September	Tour of Britain, Stage 7	UCI Europe Tour	André Greipel (GER)	United Kingdom	Ipswich
13 September	Grand Prix Cycliste de Montréal	UCI World Tour	Tim Wellens (BEL)	Canada	Montreal
16 September	Grand Prix de Wallonie	UCI Europe Tour	Jens Debusschere (BEL)	Belgium	Namur
19 September	Grand Prix Impanis-Van Petegem	UCI Europe Tour	Sean De Bie (BEL)	Belgium	Boortmeerbeek
23 September	Omloop van het Houtland	UCI Europe Tour	Jens Debusschere (BEL)	Belgium	Lichtervelde
1 October	Tour de l'Eurométropole, Stage 1	UCI Europe Tour	Jens Debusschere (BEL)	Belgium	Chièvres
4 October	Tour de l'Eurométropole, Points classification	UCI Europe Tour	Jürgen Roelandts (BEL)	Belgium	

== National, Continental and World champions 2015 ==
Date	Discipline	Jersey	Rider	Country	Location
26 June	Belgian National Time Trial Champion		Jurgen Van den Broeck (BEL)	Belgium	Postel
