= Przemysław Niemiec =

Polish racing cyclist

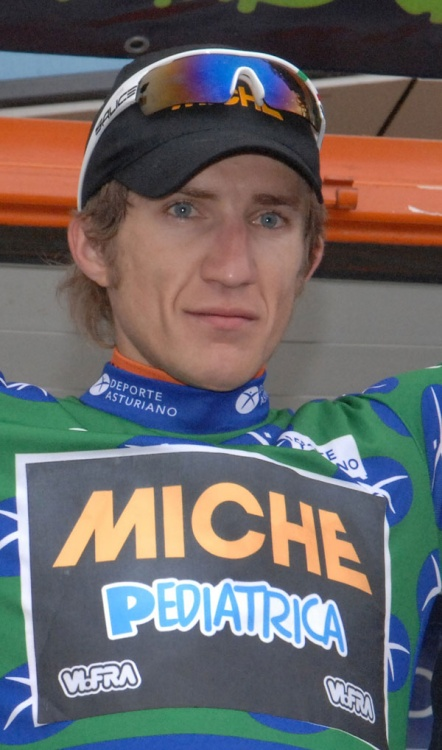
- Niemiec at the 2010 Vuelta a Asturias

Personal information
- Full name: Przemysław Niemiec
- Born: 11 April 1980 (age 46) Oświęcim, Poland
- Height: 1.84 m (6 ft 0 in)
- Weight: 66 kg (146 lb; 10.4 st)

Cycling career
- Sport: Cycling
- Current team: Retired
- Discipline: Road
- Role: Rider
- Rider type: Climber

Professional teams
- 2002–2003: Amore & Vita–Beretta
- 2004–2010: Miche
- 2011–2018: Lampre–ISD

Major wins
- Grand Tours Vuelta a España 1 individual stage (2014) Stage races Route du Sud (2009)

Przemysław Niemiec (born 11 April 1980) is a Polish former road racing cyclist, who rode professionally between 2002 and 2018 for the Amore & Vita–Beretta, Miche and UAE Team Emirates squads.

== Career ==
He made his professional debut in 2002 for the team Amore & Vita–Beretta. Born in Oświęcim, Niemiec won the 2005 Tour of Slovenia and the 2006 edition of the Tour of Tuscany. He has also won a number of stages of the Route du Sud and finished sixteenth alongside the leading competitors at the 2008 Summer Olympics.

In 2013, Niemiec had top ten finishes in many stage races including the Giro Del Trentino, the Volta a Catalunya, and in the Tirreno Adriactico. After finishing 3rd in the 2013 Giro del Trentino, Niemiec was selected to Team Lampre squad at the Giro d'Italia and he rode in support of Michele Scarponi, where he had a very solid 6th-place finish.

He won the biggest victory of his career at that point at the 2014 Vuelta a España. He was part of an early breakaway and won solo on the final climb to Lagos de Covedonga.

== Major results ==
2003
1st Giro del Medio Brenta
2004
1st GP Città di Rio Saliceto e Correggio
1st Mountains classification Tour de Pologne
5th Overall Brixia Tour
5th Coppa Placci
6th Gran Premio di Lugano
8th Overall Settimana Ciclistica Lombarda
8th Giro del Medio Brenta
10th Gran Premio Città di Camaiore
2005
1st Overall Tour of Slovenia

1st Mountains classification
1st Stage 3

1st Mountains classification Tour Méditerranéen
1st Stage 1 Giro del Trentino
2nd Overall Route du Sud
3rd Giro dell'Appennino
10th Milano–Torino
10th Giro d'Oro
10th GP Industria & Artigianato di Larciano
2006
1st Giro di Toscana
3rd Overall Tour of Slovenia
4th Overall Route du Sud

1st Stage 3

5th Giro d'Oro
6th Overall Brixia Tour
7th Overall Giro del Trentino
2008
1st Stage 3 Route du Sud
6th Overall Tour of Slovenia
6th Giro del Medio Brenta
10th Memorial Cimurri
2009
1st Overall Route du Sud

1st Stage 2

3rd Overall Giro del Trentino

1st Stage 2

5th Overall Giro della Provincia di Grosseto
8th Overall Settimana Internazionale di Coppi e Bartali
8th Gran Premio Industria e Commercio di Prato
9th GP Industria & Artigianato di Larciano
2010
2nd Overall Settimana Internazionale di Coppi e Bartali

1st Mountains classification
1st Stage 3

2nd Overall Tour des Pyrénées

1st Stage 2

3rd Overall Settimana Ciclistica Lombarda

1st Mountains classification

5th Overall Route du Sud
6th Overall Giro di Sardegna
6th Subida al Naranco
10th Gran Premio Industria e Commercio di Prato
2011
5th Giro dell'Emilia
5th Giro di Lombardia
6th Gran Piemonte
2012
4th Gran Premio Bruno Beghelli
9th Giro dell'Appennino
10th Trofeo Melinda
2013
6th Overall Giro d'Italia
6th Overall Giro del Trentino
6th Trofeo Serra de Tramuntana
7th Overall Volta a Catalunya
9th Overall Tirreno–Adriatico
2014
1st Stage 15 Vuelta a España
3rd Overall Giro del Trentino
5th Overall Tour de Pologne
2015
9th Strade Bianche
2016
Presidential Tour of Turkey

1st Mountains classification
1st Stage 1

2nd Overall Tour of Hainan
2017
8th Overall Tour of Turkey
Combativity award Stage 8 Vuelta a España

=== Grand Tour general classification results timeline ===
Grand Tour	2011	2012	2013	2014	2015	2016	2017
Giro d'Italia	40	39	6	49	40	DNF	—
Tour de France	—	—	57	—	—	—	—
Vuelta a España	54	15	—	26	DNF	—	86

Legend
—	Did not compete
DNF	Did not finish
