= 2016 Presidential Tour of Turkey =

2016 Tour of Turkey
2016 UCI Europe Tour

Race details
- Dates: 24 April–1 May
- Stages: 8

Results
Jersey awarded to the overall winner	Winner	José Gonçalves (POR)	(Caja Rural–Seguros RGA)
	Second	David Arroyo (ESP)	(Caja Rural–Seguros RGA)
	Third	Nikita Stalnov (KAZ)	(Astana)
Jersey awarded to the points classification winner	Points	Manuel Belletti (ITA)	(Southeast–Venezuela)
Jersey awarded to the mountains classification winner	Mountains	Przemysław Niemiec (POL)	(Lampre–Merida)
Jersey awarded to the combination classification winner	Combination	Lluís Mas (ESP)	(Caja Rural–Seguros RGA)
	Team	Caja Rural–Seguros RGA	

The 2016 Presidential Tour of Turkey was a road cycling stage race that took place in Turkey between 24 April and 1 May 2016. It was the 52nd edition of the Presidential Tour of Turkey and was rated as a 2.HC event as part of the 2016 UCI Europe Tour. The race included eight stages; seven of these were moderately hilly, while Stage 6 ended with a summit finish at Elmalı. The defending champion was Lampre–Merida's Kristijan Đurasek.

== Schedule ==
Stage	Date	Course	Distance	Type	Winner
1	24 April	Istanbul to Istanbul	129.2 km (80.3 mi)	Hilly stage	Przemysław Niemiec (POL)
2	25 April	Cappadocia to Cappadocia	154.1 km (95.8 mi)	Intermediate stage	Pello Bilbao (ESP)
3	26 April	Aksaray to Konya	158.9 km (98.7 mi)	Hilly stage	André Greipel (GER)
4	27 April	Seydişehir to Alanya	187 km (116.2 mi)	Hilly stage	Sacha Modolo (ITA)
5	28 April	Alanya to Kemer	189.3 km (117.6 mi)	Flat stage	Jakub Mareczko (ITA)
6	29 April	Kumluca to Elmalı	116.9 km (72.6 mi)	Mountain stage	Jaime Rosón (ESP)
7	30 April	Fethiye to Marmaris	128.6 km (79.9 mi)	Hilly stage	Sacha Modolo (ITA)
8	1 May	Marmaris to Selçuk	201.7 km (125.3 mi)	Hilly stage	Jakub Mareczko (ITA)
Total		1,265.7 km (786.5 mi)			

== Participating teams ==
Fifteen (15) team participated in the 2016 edition of the Presidential Tour of Turkey.

UCI WorldTeams (18/2)

- Lampre–Merida
- Lotto–Soudal

UCI Professional Continental teams

- CCC–Sprandi–Polkowice
- Nippo–Vini Fantini
- Team Roth
- Funvic Soul Cycles–Carrefour
- Caja Rural–Seguros RGA
- Verva ActiveJet
- Delko–Marseille Provence KTM
- Southeast–Venezuela

UCI Continental teams

- Astana City
- Hrinkow Advarics Cycleangteam
- Unieuro–Wilier
- Parkhotel Valkenburg Continental Team
- Torku Şekerspor

== Classification leadership ==
Stage	Winner	General classification turkuaz mayo	Mountains classification kırmızı mayo	Turkish Beauties classification beyaz mayo	Points classification yeşil mayo	Team classification
1	Przemysław Niemiec	Przemysław Niemiec	Rémy Di Gregorio	Lluís Mas	Przemysław Niemiec	Lampre–Merida
2	Pello Bilbao	Przemysław Niemiec	Rémy Di Gregorio	Lluís Mas	José Gonçalves	Caja Rural–Seguros RGA
3	André Greipel	Pello Bilbao	Rémy Di Gregorio	Lluís Mas	José Gonçalves	Caja Rural–Seguros RGA
4	Sacha Modolo	Pello Bilbao	Rémy Di Gregorio	Lluís Mas	José Gonçalves	Caja Rural–Seguros RGA
5	Jakub Mareczko	Pello Bilbao	Rémy Di Gregorio	Lluís Mas	Alberto Cecchin	Caja Rural–Seguros RGA
6	Jaime Rosón	José Gonçalves	Przemysław Niemiec	Lluís Mas	Alberto Cecchin	Caja Rural–Seguros RGA
7	Sacha Modolo	José Gonçalves	Przemysław Niemiec	Lluís Mas	Manuel Belletti	Caja Rural–Seguros RGA
8	Jakub Mareczko	José Gonçalves	Przemysław Niemiec	Lluís Mas	Manuel Belletti	Caja Rural–Seguros RGA
Final		José Gonçalves (cyclist)	Przemysław Niemiec	Lluís Mas	Manuel Belletti	Caja Rural–Seguros RGA

== Final standings ==
Legend
General classification	Denotes the leader of the General classification	Mountains classification	Denotes the leader of the Mountains classification
Turkish Beauties classification	Denotes the leader of the Turkish Beauties classification	Sprints classification	Denotes the leader of the Best Sprinter classification

=== General classification ===
	Rider	Team	Time
1	José Gonçalves (POR)	Caja Rural–Seguros RGA	32h 31' 35"
2	David Arroyo (ESP)	Caja Rural–Seguros RGA	+ 18"
3	Nikita Stalnov (KAZ)	Astana City	+ 56"
4	Lluís Mas (ESP)	Caja Rural–Seguros RGA	+ 2' 13"
5	Adam Hansen (AUS)	Lotto–Soudal	+ 4' 46"
6	Greg Henderson (NZL)	Lotto–Soudal	+ 6' 46"
7	Stig Broeckx (BEL)	Lotto–Soudal	+ 9' 22"
8	Gert Dockx (BEL)	Lotto–Soudal	+ 12' 46"
9	Jaime Rosón (ESP)	Caja Rural–Seguros RGA	+ 12' 58"
10	Mauro Finetto (ITA)	Unieuro–Wilier	+ 13' 08"

=== Mountains classification ===
	Rider	Team	Points
1	Przemysław Niemiec (POL)	Lampre–Merida	21
2	Ilia Koshevoy (BLR)	Lampre–Merida	16
3	Jaime Rosón (ESP)	Caja Rural–Seguros RGA	15
4	Peter Schulting (NED)	Parkhotel Valkenburg; Continental Team	14
5	Paweł Cieślik (POL)	Verva ActiveJet	13
6	Rémy Di Gregorio (FRA)	Delko–Marseille Provence KTM	12
7	Nazim Bakırcı (TUR)	Torku Şekerspor	11
8	Muhammet Atalay (TUR)	Torku Şekerspor	10
9	Jan Hirt (CZE)	CCC–Sprandi–Polkowice	10
10	Nicolas Baldo (FRA)	Team Roth	7

=== Turkish Beauties classification ===
	Rider	Team	Points
1	Lluís Mas (ESP)	Caja Rural–Seguros RGA	10
2	Paweł Cieślik (POL)	Verva ActiveJet	8
3	Peter Schulting (NED)	Parkhotel Valkenburg; Continental Team	6
4	Eduard-Michael Grosu (ROU)	Nippo–Vini Fantini	5
5	Riccardo Stacchiotti (ITA)	Nippo–Vini Fantini	5
6	Muhammet Atalay (TUR)	Torku Şekerspor	5
7	Alessandro Malaguti (ITA)	Unieuro–Wilier	4
8	Stig Broeckx (BEL)	Lotto–Soudal	3
9	Sven van Luijk (NED)	Parkhotel Valkenburg Continental Team	3
10	Rémy Di Gregorio (FRA)	Delko–Marseille Provence KTM	3

=== Points classification ===
	Rider	Team	Points
1	Manuel Belletti (ITA)	Southeast–Venezuela	62
2	Daniele Colli (ITA)	Nippo–Vini Fantini	56
3	Sacha Modolo (ITA)	Lampre–Merida	54
4	Grzegorz Stępniak (POL)	CCC–Sprandi–Polkowice	47
5	Marco Zanotti (ITA)	Parkhotel Valkenburg; Continental Team	46
6	Alberto Cecchin (ITA)	Team Roth	45
7	José Gonçalves (POR)	Caja Rural–Seguros RGA	44
8	Jakub Mareczko (ITA)	Southeast–Venezuela	41
9	Przemysław Niemiec (POL)	Lampre–Merida	41
10	Mauro Finetto (ITA)	Unieuro–Wilier	36

=== Team classification ===
	Team	Time
1	Caja Rural–Seguros RGA	97h 37' 28"
2	Lotto–Soudal	+ 15' 47"
3	Lampre–Merida	+ 37' 22"
4	Astana City	+ 44' 54"
5	Parkhotel Valkenburg Continental Team	+ 45' 29"
6	CCC–Sprandi–Polkowice	+ 1h 00' 45"
7	Unieuro–Wilier	+ 1h 01' 08"
8	Team Roth	+ 1h 10' 36"
9	Verva ActiveJet	+ 1h 14' 14"
10	Delko–Marseille Provence KTM	+ 1h 18' 29"
