= Dirk Bellemakers =

Dutch cyclist

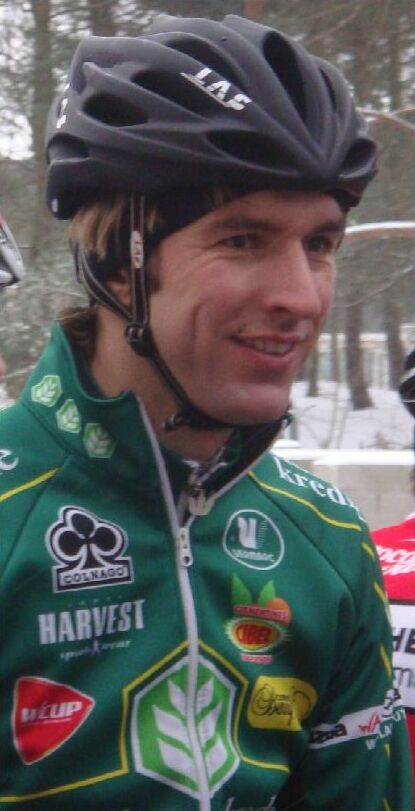
- Bellemakers in 2010.

Personal information
- Full name: Dirk Bellemakers
- Born: 19 January 1984 (age 42) Eindhoven, Netherlands
- Height: 1.96 m (6 ft 5 in)
- Weight: 75 kg (165 lb)

Cycling career
- Sport: Cycling
- Current team: Retired
- Discipline: Road
- Role: Rider

Amateur teams
- 2003–2007: Van Vliet-EBH-Advocaten-Gazelle
- 2007: Landbouwkrediet–Tönissteiner (stagiaire)

Professional teams
- 2008–2012: Landbouwkrediet–Tönissteiner
- 2013: Lotto–Belisol

Dirk Bellemakers (born 19 January 1984) is a Dutch former professional road bicycle racer, who competed as a professional between 2008 and 2013.

Bellemakers retired at the end of the 2013 season, after one season with Lotto–Belisol.
