= Fréderique Robert =

Belgian bicycle rider

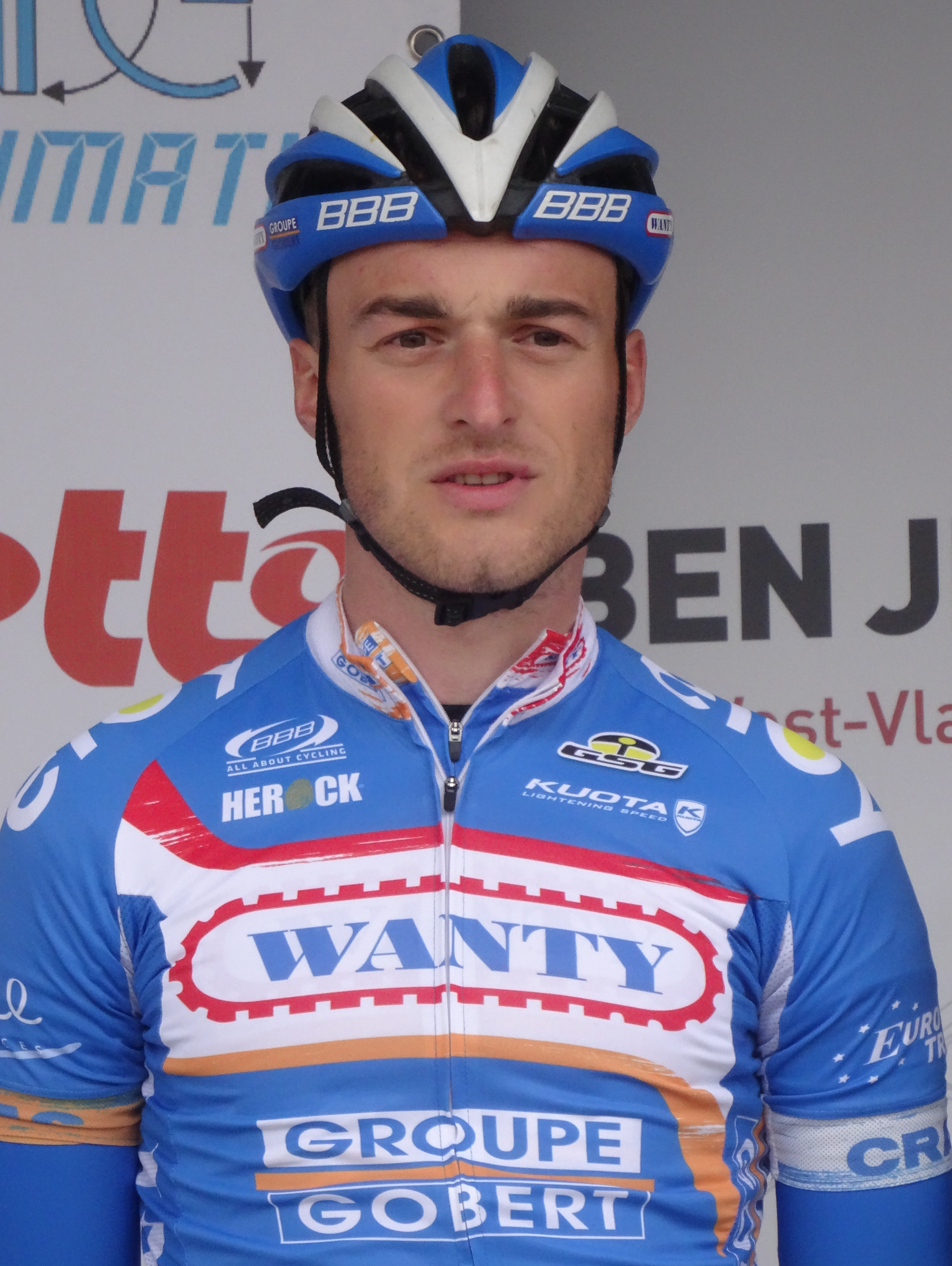
- Robert at the 2014 Omloop van het Houtland

Personal information
- Full name: Fréderique Robert
- Born: 25 January 1989 (age 37) Mol, Belgium
- Height: 1.76 m (5 ft 9 in)
- Weight: 68 kg (150 lb)

Cycling career
- Sport: Cycling
- Current team: Retired
- Discipline: Road
- Role: Rider

Amateur teams
- 2008–2010: PWS-Eijssen Team
- 2009: Quick-Step (stagiaire)
- 2010: Quick-Step (stagiaire)

Professional teams
- 2011: Quick-Step
- 2012–2013: Lotto–Belisol
- 2014–2015: Wanty–Groupe Gobert
- 2016: Crelan–Vastgoedservice

Fréderique Robert (born 25 January 1989) is a Belgian former professional cyclist.

Robert joined Wanty–Groupe Gobert for the 2014 season, after two seasons with Lotto–Belisol.

== Major results ==
2008
1st Stage 3 Le Triptyque des Monts et Châteaux
2009
4th Omloop van het Houtland
6th Nationale Sluitingsprijs
7th Antwerpse Havenpijl
2010
1st Stage 1 Le Triptyque des Monts et Châteaux
9th Omloop der Kempen
2011
7th Handzame Classic
8th Nationale Sluitingsprijs
9th Scheldeprijs
2012
7th Dwars door Drenthe
7th Dutch Food Valley Classic
2013
La Tropicale Amissa Bongo

1st Stages 1 & 5

7th Grote Prijs Stad Zottegem
2014
La Tropicale Amissa Bongo

1st Stages 6 & 7
