= Maarten Neyens =

Belgian cyclist (born 1985)

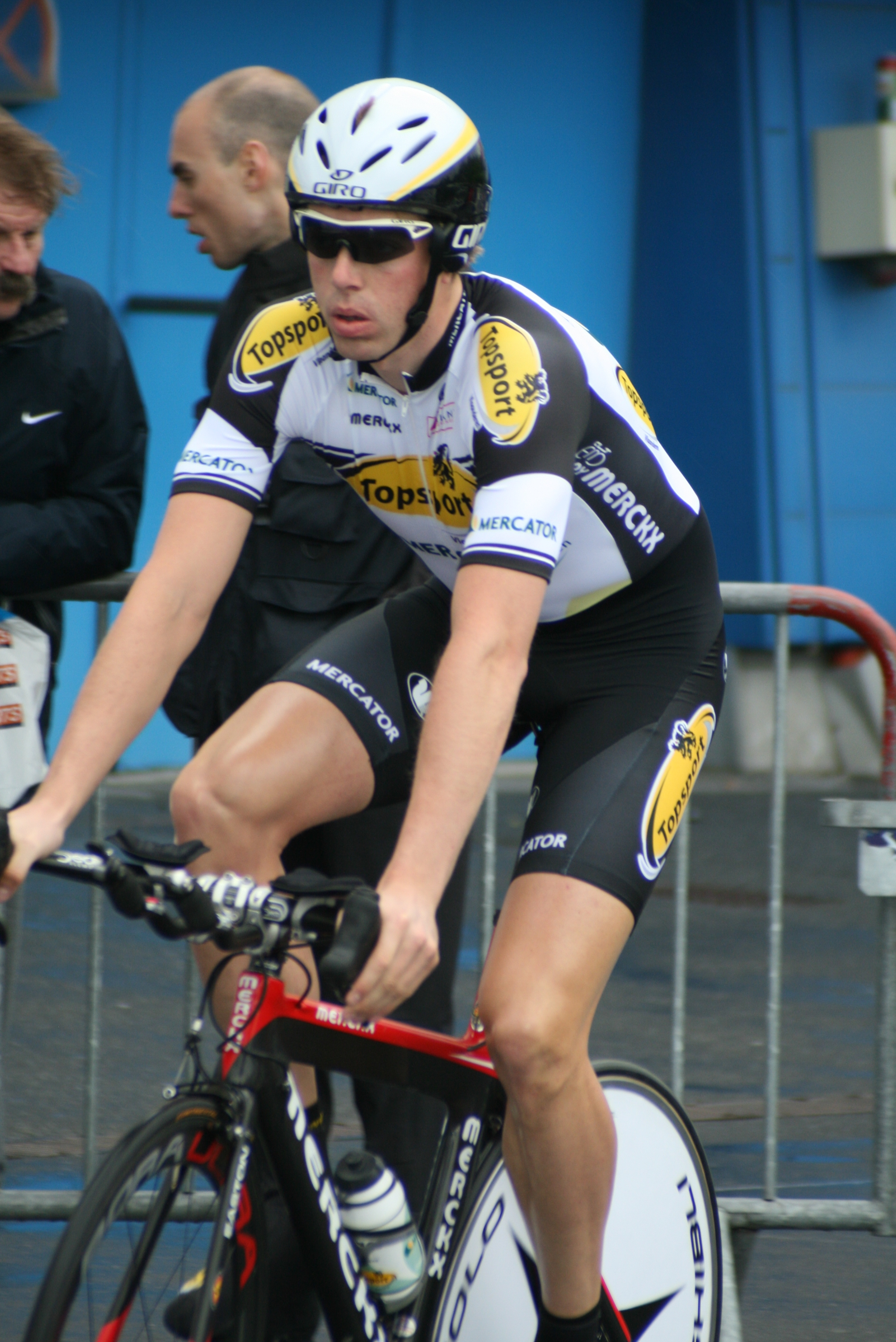
- Neyens at the 2009 Four Days of Dunkirk.

Personal information
- Full name: Maarten Neyens
- Born: 1 March 1985 (age 41) Brasschaat, Belgium
- Height: 1.90 m (6 ft 3 in)
- Weight: 74 kg (163 lb)

Cycling career
- Sport: Cycling
- Discipline: Road
- Role: Rider

Amateur teams
- 2004: Jartazi Granville Team
- 2005–2007: Bodysol–Win for Life–Jong Vlaanderen

Professional teams
- 2008–2010: Topsport Vlaanderen
- 2011–2013: Omega Pharma–Lotto

Maarten Neyens (born 1 March 1985) is a professional Belgian road cyclist, who last rode for Lotto–Belisol.

== Palmarès ==
2008
2nd I.W.T. Jong Maar Moedig
2009
2nd Beverbeek Classic
2nd Profronde van Fryslan
10th Dutch Food Valley Classic
4th Druivenkoers Overijse
2010
5th De Vlaamse Pijl
2013
10th Heistse Pijl
