= Brian Bulgaç =

Dutch cyclist (born 1988)

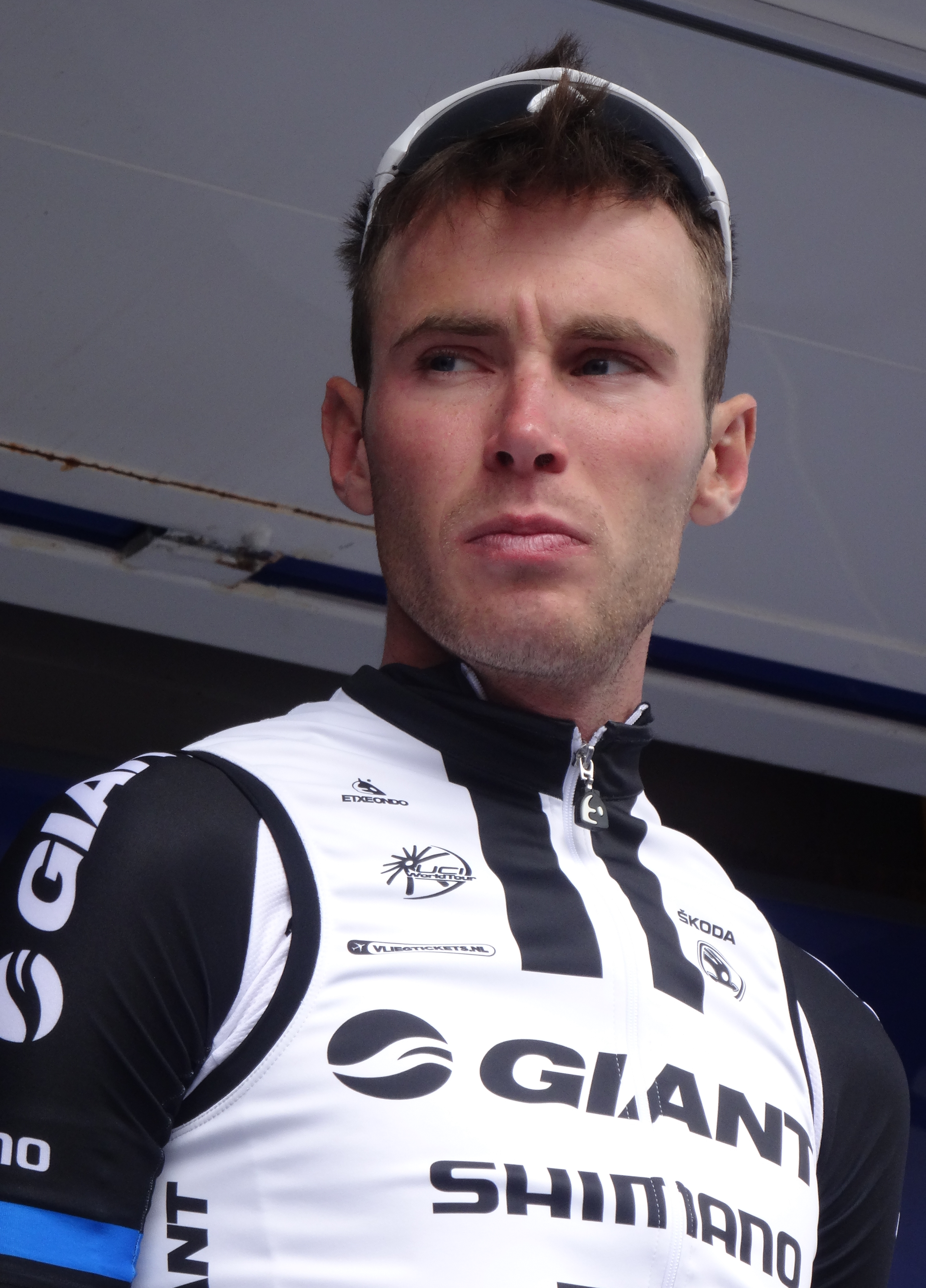
- Bulgaç in 2014

Personal information
- Full name: Brian Bulgaç
- Born: 7 April 1988 (age 38) Amsterdam, Netherlands
- Height: 1.89 m (6 ft 2 in)
- Weight: 68 kg (150 lb)

Cycling career
- Sport: Cycling
- Current team: Retired
- Discipline: Road
- Role: Rider

Amateur teams
- 2007–2008: NHT
- 2008–2009: Beveren 2000 Quick Step
- 2010–2011: Omega Pharma-Lotto Davo

Professional teams
- 2010: Rabobank Continental Team
- 2012–2013: Lotto–Belisol
- Jan 2014–Apr 2014: Parkhotel Valkenburg Continental Team
- May 2014–Dec 2014: Giant–Shimano
- 2015: LottoNL–Jumbo
- 2016: Team Vorarlberg

Brian Bulgaç (born 7 April 1988) is a Dutch professional road bicycle racer, who rode most recently for Team Vorarlberg.

== Career ==
=== Duathlon ===
Born in Amsterdam, Bulgaç started his sports career as a duathlete. He took part in several Junior European and World Championships, finishing three times in the top 20. The highlight of his duathlon career came in 2008 when he became third of Europe at the Under-23 European Duathlon Championships in Serres. He had a bright future ahead in the sport but due to an achilles tendon injury he was told by his physio therapist to just train on a bicycle for a while. His interest in cycling grew and by the time he was allowed to walk again he decided to focus on cycling.

=== Rabobank Continental Team (2010) ===
With a second place in stage two and a third place overall of the Tour de Liège in 2009 Bulgaç earned a spot in the Rabobank Continental Team for the 2010 season. His performances for Rabobank were not convincing enough to keep him in the team for 2011 with a fifth place in the prologue of the Jadranska Magistrala and a ninth place in the Ronde van Midden-Nederland as his best results.

=== Omega Pharma-Lotto development team (2011) ===
The Omega Pharma–Lotto team offered him a chance to perform in some smaller races with its development team. He took a second place in the third stage of the Triptyque Ardennaise and won the general classification of a race that has been previously won by riders like Ivan Basso, Paolo Tiralongo and Philippe Gilbert. Later that year he also won the general classification of the Tour de Liège. With help from former professional cyclist Kurt Van De Wouwer he managed to get a professional contract with Lotto–Belisol.

=== Lotto-Belisol (2012–2013) ===
He made his grand tour debut during the 2012 Giro d'Italia in which he twice rode in a long break away but failed to reach the finish before the peloton. He reached the finish line in Milan in his first grand tour as the 102nd rider overall.

=== 2014 ===
For the 2014 season, Bulgaç initially joined the Parkhotel Valkenburg Continental Team. However, in April it was announced that he would move to Giant-Shimano after being invited to a week-long training camp held by the team.

=== Team LottoNL-Jumbo (2015) ===
Bulgaç did not get a contract renewal from Giant-Shimano for the 2015 season. Instead, he joined Team LottoNL-Jumbo.

== Major results ==
2009
3rd Overall Tour de Liège
2010
9th Ronde van Midden-Nederland
2011
1st Overall Triptyque Ardennaise
1st Overall Tour de Liège
2012
102nd Overall Giro d'Italia
2014
5th Overall Tour de Taiwan
