= Dennis Vanendert =

Belgian cyclist

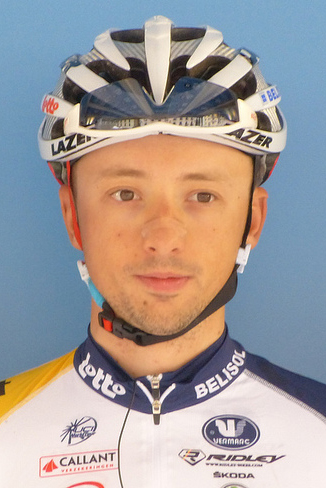

Personal information
- Full name: Dennis Vanendert
- Born: 27 June 1988 (age 38) Neerpelt, Belgium
- Height: 1.81 m (5 ft 11 in)
- Weight: 64 kg (141 lb; 10.1 st)

Cycling career
- Sport: Cycling
- Disciplines: Road and cyclo-cross
- Role: Rider

Amateur teams
- 2008–2010: Beveren 2000
- 2011: UC Pistoiese Cecchi Logistica

Professional team
- 2012–2015: Lotto–Belisol

Dennis Vanendert (born 27 June 1988) is a Belgian professional road bicycle racer and cyclo-cross rider, who last rode for UCI ProTeam Lotto–Soudal. His elder brother Jelle is also a professional cyclist, and also competed for Lotto–Belisol team.

Born in Neerpelt, Vanendert has been competing as a professional since the start of the 2012 season, joining Lotto–Belisol from Italian amateur squad UC Pistoiese Cecchi Logistica. Vanendert made his Grand Tour début at the 2012 Giro d'Italia, as one of three new professionals alongside Gaëtan Bille and Brian Bulgaç. During the eighteenth stage, Vanendert was part of the bunch sprint, and eventually finished in tenth place.

== Major results ==
2005
2nd Overall Tour du Valromey
2nd Koppenbergcross Junior
2006
1st Junior race, National Cyclo-cross Championships
2008
2nd Romsée–Stavelot–Romsée
9th Izegem
2009
3rd Beverbeek Classic
5th Zuidkempense Pijl
5th Memorial Noël Soetaert
8th Memorial Fred De Bruyne
2010
1st Aalst bij Sint Truiden
2nd Trofee van Haspengouw
5th Flèche Ardennaise
5th Circuit du Hainaut
8th Buggenhout
2011
3rd Giro del Medio Brenta
3rd Gran Premio Vivaisti Cenaiesi
4th Pistoia–Fiorano
5th Trofeo Pedalata Elettrica
6th Giro del Valdarno
6th Trofeo Società Ciclistica Corsanico
6th Giro del Pratomagno
7th Coppa Comune di Castelfranco di Sopra
8th Coppa Bologna
8th Trofeo Nesti e Nelli Concessionaria Toyota
8th Giro del Montalbano
10th Classica di Colbuccaro
2013
8th Clásica de Almería
2015
9th Grote Prijs Jef Scherens
