= Stig Broeckx =

Belgian cyclist (born 1990)

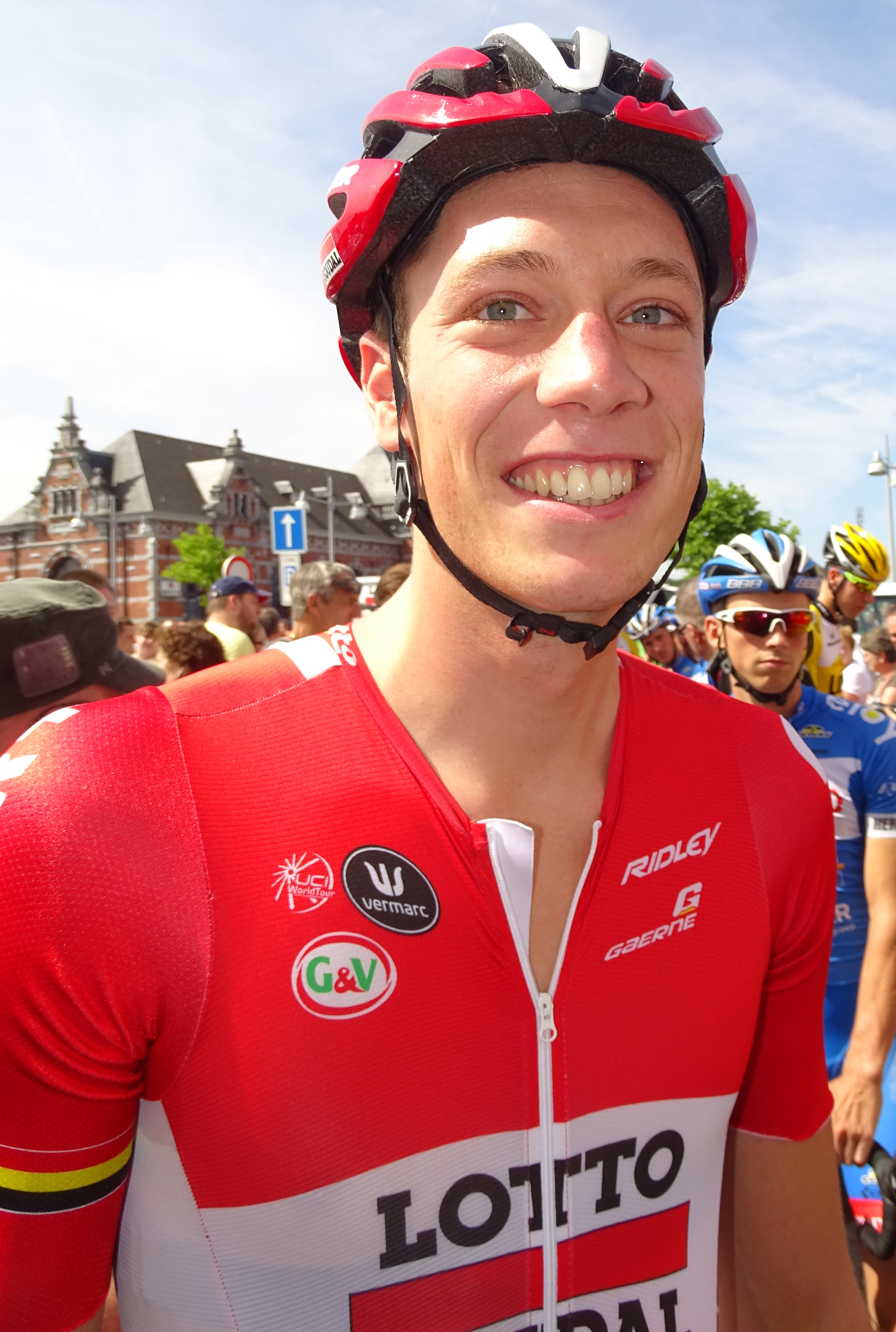
- Broeckx in 2015

Personal information
- Born: 10 May 1990 (age 36) Mol, Belgium
- Height: 188 cm (6 ft 2 in)
- Weight: 73 kg (161 lb)

Cycling career
- Sport: Cycling
- Current team: Retired
- Discipline: Road
- Role: Rider

Amateur teams
- 2012–2013: Lotto–Belisol U23
- 2013: Lotto–Belisol (stagiaire)

Professional team
- 2014–2016: Lotto–Belisol

Stig Broeckx (born 10 May 1990 in Mol) is a Belgian former racing cyclist, who competed as a professional for Lotto–Soudal from 2014 to 2016.

== Career ==
During the third stage of the 2016 Tour of Belgium, on 28 May, Broeckx was in a crash caused by two motorbikes that ran into the peloton when it was descending at speed. He was one of the 11 riders hospitalized. He was reported to suffer severe injuries (his heart stopped beating for a time) and was placed in an induced coma at the hospital in Gent. In June 2016, Lotto Soudal team issued a medical update explaining that Stig Broeckx was in a vegetative state with severe brain damage, with attempts to bring him out of his coma so far unsuccessful. A further update in September 2016 stated that Broeckx was being cared for in a rehabilitation centre in Overpelt, and was considered to be in a minimally conscious state, with no hope of recovery. His family insisted that Broeckx be sent to a pioneering coma centre in Liège; in December 2016 team doctor Servaes Bingé confirmed Broeckx was out of a coma.

By 2019 Broeckx had recovered to a great extent, and was able to walk with a cane, although he had no memory of the five years leading up to the accident, and found out who he had been from the Internet. He cycles for recreation; when asked if he was afraid, he replied "I was already dead, so why [be afraid] now?".

== Major results ==
2007
1st Stage 2 Liège–La Gleize
2012
9th Overall Okolo Slovenska
9th Flèche Ardennaise
2013
2nd Omloop Het Nieuwsblad Beloften
3rd Overall Triptyque Ardennais
7th Overall Triptyque des Monts et Châteaux
8th Overall World Ports Classic

1st Young rider classification

2014
10th Dwars door Drenthe
2015
5th Binche–Chimay–Binche
2016
7th Overall Tour of Turkey
