= Kenny Dehaes =

Belgian racing cyclist (born 1984)

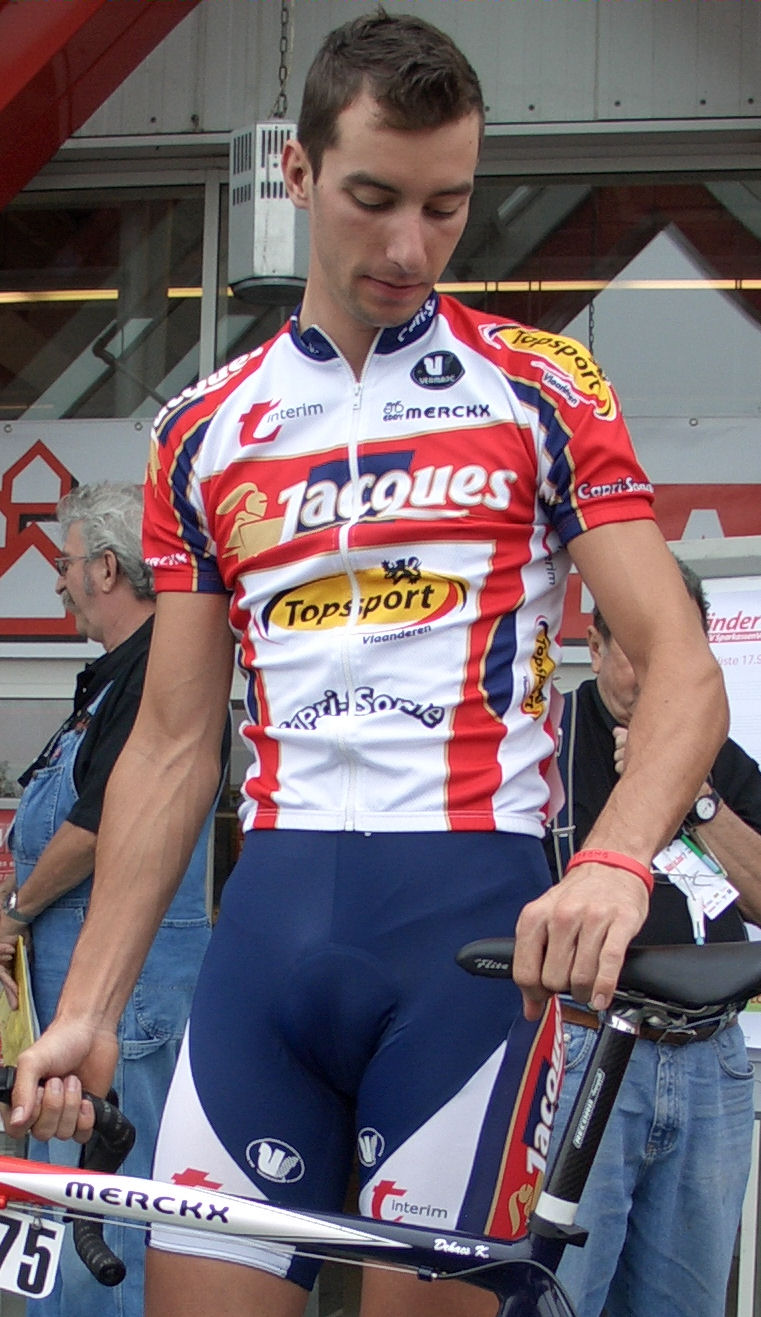
- Dehaes at the 2006 3-Länder-Tour.

Personal information
- Full name: Kenny Dehaes
- Born: 10 November 1984 (age 41) Uccle, Belgium
- Height: 1.88 m (6 ft 2 in)
- Weight: 73 kg (161 lb)

Cycling career
- Sport: Cycling
- Current team: Retired
- Discipline: Road
- Role: Rider
- Rider type: Sprinter/Classics specialist

Amateur team
- 2005: Amuzza.com–Davo

Professional teams
- 2006–2008: Chocolade Jacques–Topsport Vlaanderen
- 2009: Team Katusha
- 2009–2015: Silence–Lotto
- 2016–2017: Wanty–Groupe Gobert
- 2018–2019: WB Aqua Protect Veranclassic

Major wins
- One-day races and Classics GP de Denain (2018)

Kenny Dehaes (born 10 November 1984 in Uccle) is a Belgian former professional road bicycle racer, who rode professionally between 2006 and 2019 for the Topsport Vlaanderen, Team Katusha, Lotto–Soudal, Wanty–Groupe Gobert and Wallonie Bruxelles teams.

== Major results ==
2005
1st Ronde Van Vlaanderen Beloften
2006
10th Paris–Brussels
2007
1st Schaal Sels
7th Paris–Brussels
7th De Vlaamse Pijl
2008
1st Stage 3 Four Days of Dunkirk
1st Stage 1 Tour of Belgium
5th Gent–Wevelgem
5th Overall Tour de Picardie
4th Memorial Rik Van Steenbergen
2009
1st Grote Prijs Beeckman-De Caluwé
4th Memorial Rik Van Steenbergen
4th Paris–Brussels
5th Schaal Sels-Merksem
6th Grand Prix de Denain
2010
1st Grote Prijs Beeckman-De Caluwé
3rd Grand Prix de Fourmies
4th Nokere Koerse
6th Omloop van het Houtland
6th Nationale Sluitingsprijs
2011
2nd Overall Tour de Picardie

1st Points classification

2nd Grote Prijs Jef Scherens
6th Druivenkoers Overijse
6th Dutch Food Valley Classic
10th Grand Prix de Fourmies
2012
4th Halle–Ingooigem
9th Handzame Classic
2013
1st Trofeo Palma de Mallorca
1st Handzame Classic
1st Halle–Ingooigem
1st Stage 4 Tour de Wallonie
2nd Heistse Pijl
4th Le Samyn
5th Druivenkoers Overijse
7th Scheldeprijs
8th Trofeo Campos–Santanyí–Ses Salines
10th Brabantse Pijl
2014
1st Ronde van Drenthe
1st Nokere Koerse
7th GP Maurice Raes
8th Handzame Classic
2015
1st Grote Prijs Stad Zottegem
9th Brussels Cycling Classic
2016
1st Ronde van Limburg
1st Stage 5 Four Days of Dunkirk
3rd Grand Prix de Denain
3rd Arnhem–Veenendaal Classic
3rd Overall Tour de Picardie

1st Stage 3

3rd Antwerpse Havenpijl
4th Heistse Pijl
4th Kampioenschap van Vlaanderen
7th Grand Prix de la Somme
7th Ronde van Drenthe
8th Brussels Cycling Classic
9th Omloop Mandel-Leie-Schelde
10th Nokere Koerse
2017
1st Gooikse Pijl
2nd Tour de l'Eurométropole
2nd Grote Prijs Jef Scherens
2nd Heistse Pijl
3rd Handzame Classic
3rd GP Stad Zottegem
4th Brussels Cycling Classic
5th Arnhem–Veenendaal Classic
7th Nationale Sluitingsprijs
2018
1st Grand Prix de Denain
1st Grand Prix de la ville de Pérenchies
3rd Grote Prijs Jean-Pierre Monseré
4th Trofeo Campos, Porreres, Felanitx, Ses Salines
4th Schaal Sels
5th Ronde van Limburg
6th Handzame Classic
7th Brussels Cycling Classic
8th Kampioenschap van Vlaanderen
