= Bart De Clercq =

Belgian cyclist

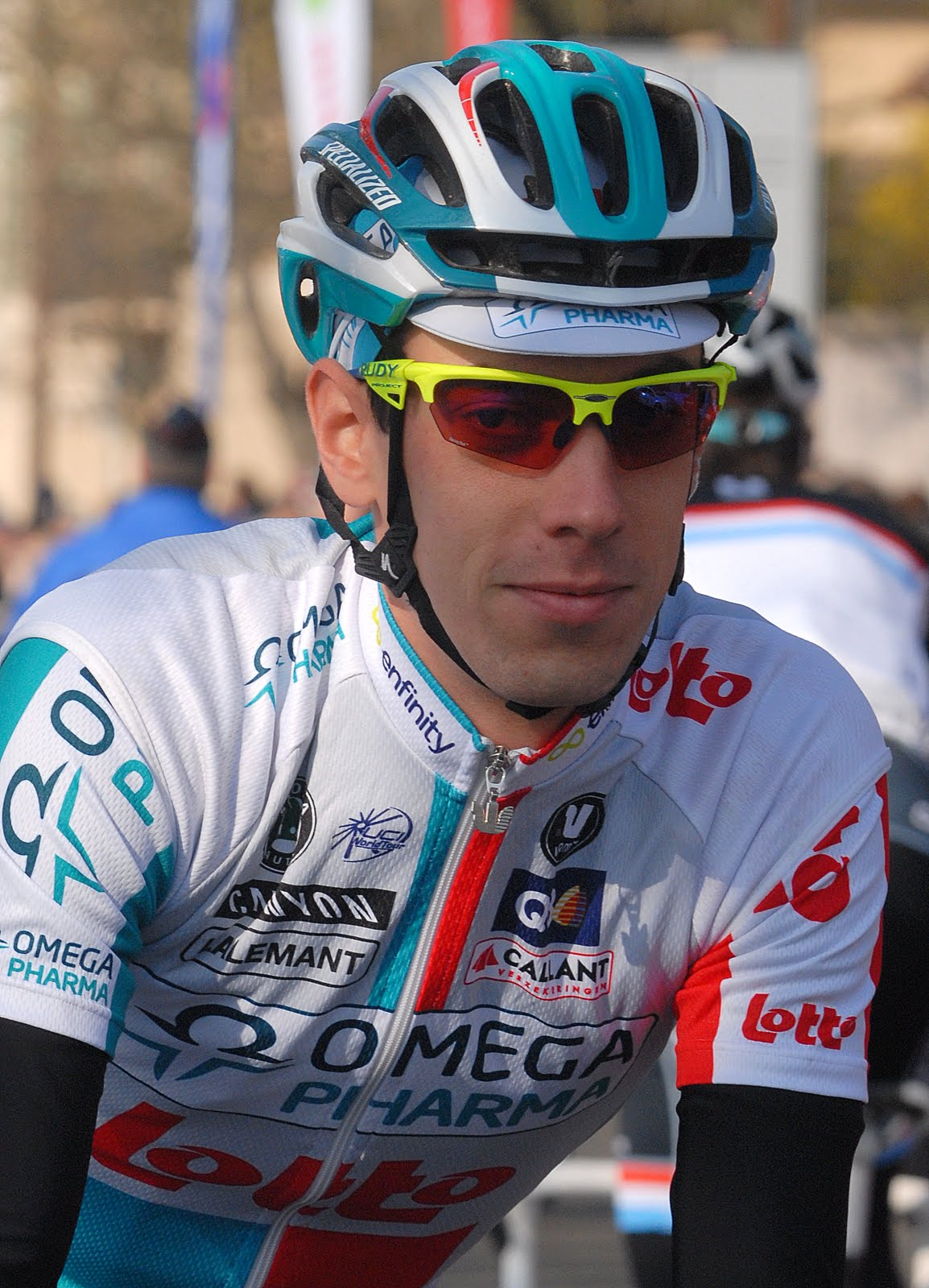
- De Clercq at the 2011 Paris–Nice.

Personal information
- Full name: Bart De Clercq
- Born: 26 August 1986 (age 40) Zottegem, Belgium
- Height: 1.83 m (6 ft 0 in)
- Weight: 67 kg (148 lb)

Cycling career
- Sport: Cycling
- Current team: Retired
- Discipline: Road
- Role: Rider
- Rider type: All-rounder

Amateur teams
- 2008: Onder Ons Parike
- 2009–2010: Davo–Lotto–Davitamon

Professional teams
- 2011–2017: Omega Pharma–Lotto
- 2018–2019: Wanty–Groupe Gobert

Major wins
- Grand Tours Giro d'Italia 1 individual stage (2011)

Bart De Clercq (born 26 August 1986) is a Belgian former professional road bicycle racer, who rode professionally between 2011 and 2019 for the Lotto–Soudal and Wanty–Gobert teams. His first professional victory was the seventh stage of the 2011 Giro d'Italia.

== Major results ==
2009
4th Circuit de Wallonie
5th Overall Grand Prix Guillaume Tell
2010
5th Overall Giro della Valle d'Aosta
2011
1st Stage 7 Giro d'Italia
2013
5th Overall Vuelta a Andalucía
7th Trofeo Serra de Tramuntana
9th Overall Tour de San Luis
2015
2nd Overall Tour de Pologne

1st Stage 5

2016
2nd Overall Tour de l'Ain

1st Mountains classification

=== Grand Tour general classification results timeline ===
Grand Tour	2011	2012	2013	2014	2015	2016	2017
Giro d'Italia	26	40	—	—	—	—	DNF
Tour de France	—	—	38	DNF	—	—	—
Vuelta a España	—	17	DNF	34	14	53	40

Legend
—	Did not compete
DNF	Did not finish
