= Gert Dockx =

Belgian cyclist

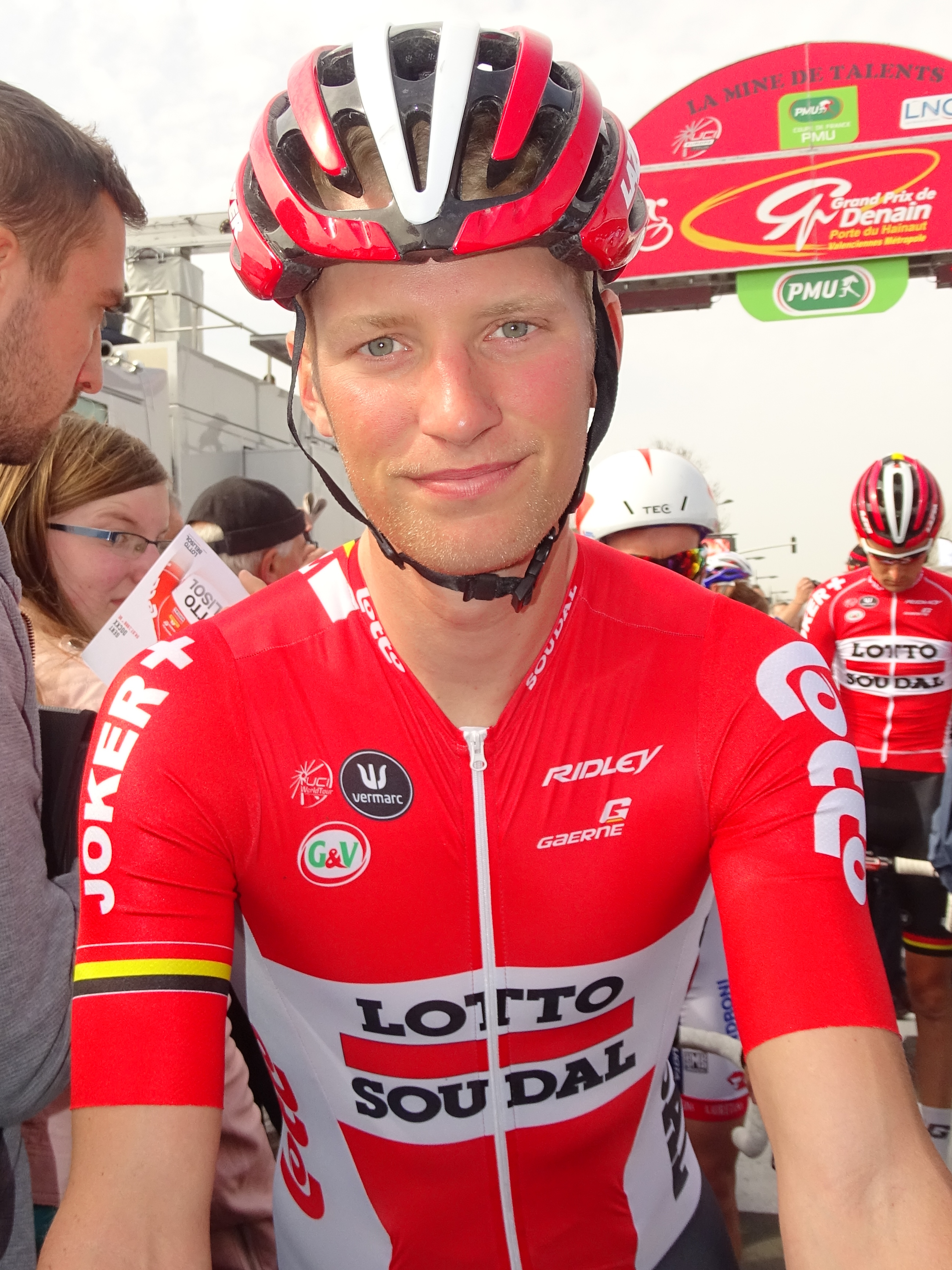
- Dockx at the 2015 Grand Prix de Denain

Personal information
- Full name: Gert Dockx
- Born: 4 July 1988 (age 38) Turnhout, Belgium
- Height: 1.75 m (5 ft 9 in)
- Weight: 64 kg (141 lb)

Cycling career
- Sport: Cycling
- Current team: Retired
- Discipline: Road
- Role: Rider

Amateur teams
- 2007–2008: Beveren 2000 Quick Step
- 2008: Team Columbia (stagiaire)

Professional teams
- 2009–2010: Team Columbia–High Road
- 2011: Omega Pharma–Lotto
- 2012–2016: Lotto–Belisol

Gert Dockx (born 4 July 1988) is a former Belgian professional road bicycle racer who rode for UCI ProTour team Lotto–Soudal.

== Career achievements ==
=== Major results ===
2010
7th Hel van het Mergelland
2012
6th Druivenkoers Overijse
2013
1st Stage 7 La Tropicale Amissa Bongo
2016
7th Grand Prix Pino Cerami
8th Overall Tour of Turkey

=== Grand Tour general classification results timeline ===
Grand Tour	2016
Giro d'Italia	—
Tour de France	—
Vuelta a España	126

Legend
—	Did not compete
DNF	Did not finish
