= List of wins by Shimano–Memory Corp and its successors =

This is a comprehensive list of victories of the Team Picnic–PostNL cycling team. The races are categorized according to the UCI rules.

== 2005 – Shimano–Memory Corp ==
Stage 2 Tour of Siam, Kaoru Ouchi
Niedersachsen-Rundfahrt, Stefan Schumacher
Stage 1, 2 & 3 Rheinland-Pfalz Rundfahrt, Stefan Schumacher
Overall Ster Elektrotoer, Stefan Schumacher
(Japan) Japanese National Road Race Championships, Hidenori Nodera

== 2006 – Skil Shimano ==
Grand Prix Pino Cerami, Sebastian Langeveld
Overall Tour of Belgium, Maarten Tjallingii

Stage 1, Maarten Tjallingii

Stage 2 Tour du Luxembourg, Paul Martens
Stage 1 Ster Elektrotoer, Aart Vierhouten
Noord Nederland Tour, Aart Vierhouten
Overall Tour of Qinghai Lake, Maarten Tjallingii

Stage 1 & 2, René Weissinger
Stage 7, Maarten Tjallingii

Münsterland Giro, Paul Martens

== 2007 – Skil Shimano ==
Ronde van Noord-Holland, Kenny van Hummel
Stage 2 Ster Elektrotoer, Paul Martens
Profronde van Friesland, Maarten Den Bakker
Nationale Sluitingsprijs, Floris Goesinnen

== 2008 – Skil Shimano ==
Stage 7 Jelajah Malaysia, Yusuke Hatanaka
Ronde van Noord-Holland, Robert Wagner
Stage 1 Tour de Picardie, Sebastian Siedler
(Japan) Japanese National Road Race Championships, Hidenori Nodera
Stage 1 Delta Tour Zeeland, Robert Wagner
Stage 1 Tour de Korea, Shinri Suzuki
Stage 7 Tour of Qinghai Lake, Tom Veelers
Stage 1b Brixia Tour, Team Time Trial
Stage 1 Tour de l'Ain, Floris Goesinnen
Stage 1 Tour of South China Sea, Ji Cheng

== 2009 – Skil Shimano ==
Ronde van Overijssel, Kenny van Hummel
Stage 1 Four Days of Dunkirk, Kenny van Hummel
Batavus Prorace, Kenny van Hummel
Dutch Food Valley Classic, Kenny van Hummel
Tour de Rijke, Kenny van Hummel
Stage 2 Delta Tour Zeeland, Robert Wagner
Stage 9 Tour of Qinghai Lake, Tom Veelers

== 2010 – Skil Shimano ==
Stage 2 Driedaagse van West-Vlaanderen, Robert Wagner
Hel van het Mergelland, Yann Huguet
Ronde van Noord-Holland, Robert Wagner
Ronde van Overijssel, Job Vissers
Stage 1 Tour de Picardie, Kenny van Hummel
Stage 2 Bayern-Rundfahrt, Robert Wagner
Stage 2 Tour of Belgium, Kenny van Hummel
Stage 4 Tour of Belgium, Dominique Cornu
Stage 1 Delta Tour Zeeland, Mitchell Docker
Stage 2 Delta Tour Zeeland, Robert Wagner
Stage 3 Route du Sud, Mitchell Docker
Stage 4, 5, 7 & 9 Tour of Hainan, Kenny van Hummel

== 2011 – Skil Shimano ==
Stage 3 Tour de Langkawi, Marcel Kittel
Stage 2 Critérium International, Simon Geschke
Overall Ronde van Drenthe, Kenny van Hummel

Stages 1 & 2, Kenny van Hummel

Stage 8 Presidential Cycling Tour of Turkey, Kenny van Hummel
Stages 1, 2, 3 & 5 Four Days of Dunkirk, Marcel Kittel
ProRace Berlin, Marcel Kittel
Overall Delta Tour Zeeland, Marcel Kittel

Stage 1, Marcel Kittel

Halle–Ingooigem, Roy Curvers
Stage 4 Tour of Austria, Alexandre Geniez
Stages 1, 2, 3 & 7 Tour de Pologne, Marcel Kittel
Stage 7 Vuelta a España, Marcel Kittel
Memorial Rik Van Steenbergen, Kenny van Hummel
Kampioenschap van Vlaanderen, Marcel Kittel
Stage 3 Circuit Franco-Belge, Tom Veelers
Münsterland Giro, Marcel Kittel
Stages 3 & 5 Herald Sun Tour, Marcel Kittel
Stage 3 Tour of Hainan, Tom Veelers
Stages 6, 7 & 9 Tour of Hainan, Kenny van Hummel

== 2012 – Project 1t4i / Argos–Shimano ==
(Japan) Japanese National Road Race Championships, Yukihiro Doi
Overall UCI Europe Tour, John Degenkolb
Stage 2 Étoile de Bessèges, Marcel Kittel
Stages 3 & 6 Tour of Oman, Marcel Kittel
Prologue Vuelta a Andalucía, Patrick Gretsch
Stage 2 Three Days of De Panne, Marcel Kittel
Scheldeprijs, Marcel Kittel
Stages 1 & 2 Four Days of Dunkirk, John Degenkolb
Overall Tour de Picardie, John Degenkolb

Stages 1 & 3, John Degenkolb

Stages 1 & 4 Ster ZLM Toer, Marcel Kittel
Stage 7 Tour de Pologne, John Degenkolb
Stages 1 & 4 Eneco Tour, Marcel Kittel
Stages 2, 5, 7, 10 & 21 Vuelta a España, John Degenkolb
Kampioenschap van Vlaanderen, Ronan van Zandbeek
Grand Prix d'Isbergues, John Degenkolb
Omloop van het Houtland, Marcel Kittel
Stages 2 & 3 Tour de l'Eurometropole, Marcel Kittel
Münsterland Giro, Marcel Kittel
Stages 5 & 8 Tour of Hainan, Ramon Sinkeldam

== 2013 – Argos–Shimano ==
Stage 1 Tour of Oman, Marcel Kittel
Stage 2 Paris–Nice, Marcel Kittel
Stage 5 Volta a Catalunya, François Parisien
Scheldeprijs, Marcel Kittel
Stages 1, 7 & 8 Tour of Turkey, Marcel Kittel
Stage 5 Giro d'Italia, John Degenkolb
Overall Tour de Picardie, Marcel Kittel

Stages 1 & 3, Marcel Kittel

ProRace Berlin, Marcel Kittel
Stage 3 Ster ZLM Toer, Marcel Kittel
Stages 1, 10, 12 & 21 Tour de France, Marcel Kittel
Stage 3 Arctic Race of Norway, Nikias Arndt
Vattenfall Cyclassics, John Degenkolb
Stages 13 & 16 Vuelta a España, Warren Barguil
Grote Prijs Jef Scherens, Bert De Backer
Omloop van het Houtland, Marcel Kittel
Stages 2 & 4 Tour de l'Eurometropole, John Degenkolb
Binche–Chimay–Binche, Reinardt Janse van Rensburg
Paris–Bourges, John Degenkolb
Paris–Tours, John Degenkolb
Stage 5 Tour of Beijing, Luka Mezgec

== 2014 – Giant–Shimano ==
People's Choice Classic, Marcel Kittel
Stages 2, 3 & 4 Dubai Tour, Marcel Kittel
Overall Étoile de Bessèges, Tobias Ludvigsson

Stage 5 (ITT), Tobias Ludvigsson

Stages 1, 2 & 3 Tour Méditerranéen, John Degenkolb
Stage 3 Paris–Nice, John Degenkolb
Handzame Classic, Luka Mezgec
Stages 1, 2 & 5 Volta a Catalunya, Luka Mezgec
Stage 2 (ITT) Critérium International, Tom Dumoulin
Gent–Wevelgem, John Degenkolb
Stage 2 Circuit de la Sarthe, Jonas Ahlstrand
Scheldeprijs, Marcel Kittel
Stages 2 & 3 Giro d'Italia, Marcel Kittel
Stage 4 Four Days of Dunkirk, Thierry Hupond
Stage 2 World Ports Classic, Ramon Sinkeldam
Stage 21 Giro d'Italia, Luka Mezgec
Stage 3 Critérium du Dauphiné, Nikias Arndt
Grand Prix of Aargau Canton, Simon Geschke
Stage 1 Ster ZLM Toer, Marcel Kittel
Netherlands National Time Trial Championships, Tom Dumoulin
Stages 1, 3, 4 & 21 Tour de France, Marcel Kittel
Stage 3 (ITT) Eneco Tour, Tom Dumoulin
Points classification Vuelta a España, John Degenkolb

Stages 4, 5, 12 & 17, John Degenkolb

Prologue (ITT) Tour of Alberta, Tom Dumoulin
Stage 2 Tour of Alberta, Jonas Ahlstrand
Stages 1 & 8b Tour of Britain, Marcel Kittel
Paris–Bourges, John Degenkolb
Stage 1 Tour of Beijing, Luka Mezgec

== 2015 – Team Giant–Alpecin ==
Down Under Classic, Marcel Kittel
Stage 3 Dubai Tour, John Degenkolb
Stage 2 Tour du Haut Var, Luka Mezgec
Milan–San Remo, John Degenkolb
Stage 6 (ITT) Tour of the Basque Country, Tom Dumoulin
Paris–Roubaix, John Degenkolb
Stages 2 & 5 Bayern–Rundfahrt, John Degenkolb
Velothon Berlin, Ramon Sinkeldam
Stages 1 (ITT) & 9 (ITT) Tour de Suisse, Tom Dumoulin
Austria National Time Trial Championships, Georg Preidler
Stage 17 Tour de France, Simon Geschke
Stage 1 Tour de Pologne, Marcel Kittel
Stages 9 & 17 (ITT) Vuelta a España, Tom Dumoulin
Kernen Omloop Echt-Susteren, Max Walscheid
Stage 6 Tour of Alberta, Nikias Arndt
Stage 21 Vuelta a España, John Degenkolb

== 2016 – Team Giant–Alpecin ==
Stage 1 (ITT) Giro d'Italia, Tom Dumoulin
Stage 21 Giro d'Italia, Nikias Arndt
Stage 4 Tour of Belgium, Zico Waeytens
Netherlands National Time Trial Championships, Tom Dumoulin
Stages 9 & 13 (ITT) Tour de France, Tom Dumoulin
Overall Tour de l'Ain, Sam Oomen

Stage 3, Sam Oomen

Stage 4 Arctic Race of Norway, John Degenkolb
Münsterland Giro, John Degenkolb
Stage 3, 4, 5, 7 & 9 Tour of Hainan, Max Walscheid

== 2017 – Team Sunweb ==
Cadel Evans Great Ocean Road Race, Nikias Arndt
Stage 3 Tour of Oman, Søren Kragh Andersen
Stage 1 Tour of the Basque Country, Michael Matthews
Overall, Giro d'Italia, Tom Dumoulin

Stages 10 (ITT) & 14, Tom Dumoulin

Stage 3 (TTT) Hammer Sportzone Limburg
Stage 5 Critérium du Dauphiné, Phil Bauhaus
Stage 3 Tour de Suisse, Michael Matthews
Netherlands National Time Trial Championships, Tom Dumoulin
Austria National Time Trial Championships, Georg Preidler
Netherlands National Road Race Championships, Ramon Sinkeldam
Mountains classification, Tour de France, Warren Barguil

Stages 13 & 18, Warren Barguil

Points classification, Tour de France, Michael Matthews

Stages 14 & 16, Michael Matthews

Overall BinckBank Tour, Tom Dumoulin
Stage 5 Danmark Rundt, Max Walscheid
UCI Road World Championships – Men's team time trial
UCI World Time Trial Championships, Tom Dumoulin

== 2018 – Team Sunweb ==
Stage 3 Abu Dhabi Tour, Phil Bauhaus
Prologue Tour de Romandie, Michael Matthews
Stage 1 (ITT) Giro d'Italia, Tom Dumoulin
Stage 3 Tour de Yorkshire, Max Walscheid
Stage 6 Tour de Suisse, Søren Kragh Andersen
Stage 20 (ITT) Tour de France, Tom Dumoulin
Stage 7 BinckBank Tour, Michael Matthews
Grand Prix Cycliste de Québec, Michael Matthews
Grand Prix Cycliste de Montréal, Michael Matthews
Münsterland Giro, Max Walscheid
Paris - Tours, Søren Kragh Andersen

== 2019 – Team Sunweb ==
Nokere Koerse, Cees Bol
Stages 2 & 6 Volta a Catalunya, Michael Matthews
Stage 7 Tour of California, Cees Bol
Stage 1 Tour of Norway, Cees Bol
Stage 21 (ITT) Giro d'Italia, Chad Haga
Stage 8 Vuelta a España, Nikias Arndt
Grand Prix Cycliste de Québec, Michael Matthews
Omloop van het Houtland, Max Walscheid

== 2020 – Team Sunweb ==
Overall Herald Sun Tour, Jai Hindley

Stage 1, Alberto Dainese
Stages 2 & 4, Jai Hindley

Stage 3 Volta ao Algarve, Cees Bol
Stage 4 (ITT) Paris–Nice, Søren Kragh Andersen
Stage 6 Paris–Nice, Tiesj Benoot
Bretagne Classic, Michael Matthews
Stage 12 Tour de France, Marc Hirschi
Stages 14 & 19 Tour de France, Søren Kragh Andersen
Stage 2 Okolo Slovenska, Nico Denz
La Flèche Wallonne, Marc Hirschi
Stage 4 (ITT) BinckBank Tour, Søren Kragh Andersen
Paris–Tours, Casper Pedersen
Stage 18 Giro d'Italia, Jai Hindley

== 2021 – Team DSM ==
Stage 2 Paris–Nice, Cees Bol
Overall Tour de l'Ain, Michael Storer

Stage 3, Michael Storer

Stage 3 Vuelta a Burgos, Romain Bardet
Stage 5 Tour de Pologne, Nikias Arndt
Mountains classification Vuelta a España, Michael Storer

Stages 7 & 10, Michael Storer
Stage 14, Romain Bardet

== 2022 – Team DSM ==
Stage 5 Tour of Turkey, Sam Welsford
Overall Tour of the Alps, Romain Bardet
Stage 11 Giro d'Italia, Alberto Dainese
Stage 2 Tour de Suisse, Andreas Leknessund
Stage 6 Tour de Suisse, Nico Denz
Stage 6 (ITT) Tour de Pologne, Thymen Arensman
Overall Arctic Race of Norway, Andreas Leknessund

Stage 4, Andreas Leknessund

Stage 15 Vuelta a España, Thymen Arensman
Stage 2 Tour of Britain, Cees Bol

== 2023 – Team DSM ==
Stages 6 & 7 Vuelta a San Juan, Sam Welsford
Cadel Evans Great Ocean Road Race, Marius Mayrhofer
Grand Prix Criquielion, Sam Welsford
Stage 17 Giro d'Italia, Alberto Dainese
Prologue ZLM Tour, Nils Eekhoff
Czech Republic U23 National Time Trial Championships, Pavel Bittner
Stage 1 Arctic Race of Norway, Alberto Dainese
Stage 4 Renewi Tour, Sam Welsford
Stage 1 (TTT) Vuelta a España (Note: The riders on the squad were Lorenzo Milesi, Romain Bardet, Sean Flynn, Chris Hamilton, Oscar Onley, Max Poole, Alberto Dainese and Romain Combaud)
Stage 19 Vuelta a España, Alberto Dainese

== 2024 – Team dsm–firmenich PostNL ==
Stage 5 Tour Down Under, Oscar Onley
Stage 1 AlUla Tour, Casper van Uden
Overall Presidential Tour of Turkey, Frank van den Broek

Stage 1, Fabio Jakobsen
Stages 4, 5 & 7, Tobias Lund Andresen
Stage 6, Frank van den Broek

Rund um Köln, Casper van Uden
Stages 2 & 4 ZLM Tour, Casper van Uden
Latvia National Road Race Championships, Emīls Liepiņš
Stage 1 Tour de France, Romain Bardet
Stages 1 & 5 Vuelta a Burgos, Pavel Bittner
Stage 1 (TTT) Danmark Rundt (Note: The riders on the squad were Tobias Lund Andresen, Frank van den Broek, Johan Dorussen, Alex Edmondson, Nils Eekhoff, Sean Flynn and Warren Barguil)
Stages 3 & 5 Danmark Rundt, Tobias Lund Andresen
Stage 5 Vuelta a España, Pavel Bittner
Overall Tour de Langkawi, Max Poole

Stage 3, Max Poole

Stage 4 CRO Race, Tobias Lund Andresen

== 2025 – Team Picnic PostNL ==
Surf Coast Classic, Tobias Lund Andresen

== 2026 – Team Picnic PostNL ==
1st Stage 5 Tour of Turkiye, Casper van Uden

== Supplementary statistics ==
World Team Time Trial performance
World TTT Championships	2005	2006	2007	2008	2009	2010	2011	2012	2013	2014	2015	2016	2017	2018	2019	2020	2021	2022	2023
Position	Did not Exist							18	14	8	5	7	1	2	Does not Exist				
Margin	Did not Exist							+ 3' 02"	+ 3' 07"	+ 1' 27"	+ 1' 04"	+ 1' 26"	–	+ 18"	Does not Exist				
Grand Tours by highest finishing position
Race	2005	2006	2007	2008	2009	2010	2011	2012	2013	2014	2015	2016	2017	2018	2019	2020	2021	2022	2023
Giro d'Italia	–	–	–	–	–	–	–	–	52	27	83	26	1	2	34	2	7	18	8
Tour de France	–	–	–	–	87	–	–	103	41	33	14	23	10	2	40	54	45	6	46
Vuelta a España	–	–	–	–	–	–	48	71	36	8	6	52	4	10	7	37	25	6	21
Major week-long stage races by highest finishing position
Race	2005	2006	2007	2008	2009	2010	2011	2012	2013	2014	2015	2016	2017	2018	2019	2020	2021	2022	2023
Tour Down Under	–	–	–	–	–	–	82	–	73	24	4	25	9	15	6	18	NH		21
Paris–Nice	–	–	–	11	8	43	–	66	70	25	41	12	8	13	14	2	5	11	7
Tirreno–Adriatico	–	–	–	–	–	–	–	–	34	25	71	75	6	84	4	4	8	6	18
Volta a Catalunya	–	–	–	–	–	–	–	38	71	9	17	22	16	18	59	NH	42	34	39
Tour of the Basque Country	–	–	–	–	–	–	–	–	–	20	29	36	16	57	38	NH	29	28	26
Tour de Romandie	–	–	–	–	–	–	–	–	34	34	67	5	7	36	36	NH	11	34	4
Critérium du Dauphiné	–	–	–	–	–	–	–	27	18	62	69	95	14	80	41	23	22	31	13
Tour de Suisse	–	–	–	–	–	–	–	–	30	5	3	3	60	5	10	NH	15	13	5
Tour de Pologne	–	–	–	–	–	46	30	9	17	14	17	47	4	9	2	7	7	2	10
Eneco Tour	92	11	9	10	63	9	15	27	2	3	14	9	1	2	5	2	8	NH	23
Monument races by highest finishing position
Monument	2005	2006	2007	2008	2009	2010	2011	2012	2013	2014	2015	2016	2017	2018	2019	2020	2021	2022	2023
Milan–San Remo	–	–	–	–	–	–	–	5	18	39	1	19	12	7	11	3	9	7	39
Tour of Flanders	–	46	28	51	52	36	92	59	9	14	7	65	28	18	6	10	12	18	19
Paris–Roubaix	–	16	31	29	56	13	15	63	25	2	1	15	25	11	44	NH	24	18	7
Liège–Bastogne–Liège	–	–	–	71	76	–	54	53	19	24	25	6	4	12	30	2	7	25	15
Giro di Lombardia	–	–	–	–	–	–	–	DNF	18	36	20	8	11	27	31	19	8	9	11
Classics by highest finishing position
Classic	2005	2006	2007	2008	2009	2010	2011	2012	2013	2014	2015	2016	2017	2018	2019	2020	2021	2022	2023
Omloop Het Nieuwsblad	DNF	25	70	22	29	9	49	11	23	8	52	–	12	6	12	3	23	43	32
Kuurne–Brussels–Kuurne	–	45	6	65	16	17	16	6	NH	17	–	33	–	–	–	–	–	16	25
Strade Bianche	—	—	–	–	–	–	–	17	27	8	–	–	5	21	17	DNF	20	39	41
E3 Harelbeke	14	3	38	20	53	39	25	6	42	15	25	67	28	13	10	NH	15	22	34
Gent–Wevelgem	–	25	36	19	12	20	6	57	31	1	14	16	8	13	11	21	35	5	12
Amstel Gold Race	15	46	42	107	79	35	39	44	18	6	26	15	10	24	16	NH	15	29	27
La Flèche Wallonne	–	–	–	47	41	–	25	25	27	21	26	9	6	5	8	1	24	40	9
Clásica de San Sebastián	—	—	—	—	—	—	—	—	42	31	9	33	4	55	3	NH	23	24	21
Paris–Tours	—	21	36	12	11	19	9	4	1	43	14	11	2	1	15	1	81	28	11

Legend
—	Did not compete
DNF	Did not finish
NH	Not held
