= Brian Robinson (cyclist) =

English road bicycle racer (1930–2022)

Brian Robinson BEM
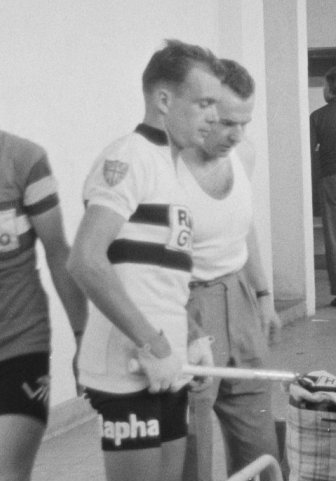
- Robinson at the 1960 Tour de France

Personal information
- Full name: Brian Robinson
- Born: 3 November 1930 Mirfield, West Riding of Yorkshire, England
- Died: 25 October 2022 (aged 91)

Cycling career
- Sport: Cycling
- Discipline: Road
- Role: Rider

Professional teams
- 1954: Ellis Briggs
- 1954–1955: Hercules
- 1956: Meulenberg
- 1956: La Perle–Coupry
- 1956: Cilo–Saint-Raphaël
- 1957–1958: Saint-Raphaël–R. Geminiani–Dunlop
- 1959: Elswick Hopper
- 1959: Saint-Raphaël–R. Geminiani–Dunlop
- 1960–1961: Rapha–Gitane–Dunlop
- 1962: Saint-Raphaël–Gitane–R. Geminiani
- 1963: Peugeot–BP–Englebert

Major wins
- Grand Tours Tour de France 2 individual stages (1958, 1959) Stage races Critérium du Dauphiné Libéré (1961)

Brian Robinson BEM (3 November 1930 – 25 October 2022) was an English road bicycle racer of the 1950s and early 1960s. He was the first Briton to finish the Tour de France and the first to win a Tour stage. He won the 1961 Critérium du Dauphiné Libéré stage race. His success as a professional cyclist in mainland Europe paved the way for other Britons such as Tom Simpson and Barry Hoban.

== Early life and amateur career ==
Robinson grew up during the Second World War, which began when he was eight years old. His family lived in Ravensthorpe and moved to Mirfield in 1943. Both his parents worked at a factory producing parts for Halifax bombers, Henry at night and Milly by day. The family rented a small area of land, known as an allotment, where they kept rabbits and two pigs.

=== Early career ===
Robinson rode with the Huddersfield Road Club at 13 and joined when he reached the club's minimum age the following year. His elder brother, Des, and his father were already members. His father, however, would not let Robinson start racing until he was 18. He worked for the family building business, training before and after work, and frequently raced on roads in Sutton Park, Birmingham, where races had to end by 9.30 am so the public could use the park. In 1948 he went to Windsor to watch the Olympic Games road race in Windsor Great Park "little realising that four years later I would make the next Olympics in Helsinki".

He was fifth in the National Cyclists' Union massed-start championship and third in the Road Time Trials Council (RTTC) hill-climb championship in 1950. The following year, he was equal seventh in the Isle of Man International, tenth in the NCU massed-start championship, and second in the RTTC hill-climb championship. In 1952 he was fourth in the NCU title race, won the hill-climb championship, and was fifth in the Isle of Man International.

=== International experience ===
In spring 1952 whilst doing his national service Robinson rode the Route de France, amateur version of the Tour de France, in a joint NCU/Army team. He rode well and was fifth with three days to go, but poor days in the Pyrenees saw him slip to 40th. The following August, he represented Great Britain at Helsinki in the Olympic Games road race. Robinson finished 27th, one place behind his brother, to André Noyelle of Belgium. The future Tour de France winner, Jacques Anquetil, was 12th, and Robinson raced against him again in the world cycling championship in Italy in September 1952 where they tied for eighth.

== Professional career ==
=== The new professional ===
In 1953, Robinson left the King's Own Yorkshire Light Infantry and joined the Ellis Briggs team as an independent, or semi-professional. He rode the Tour of Britain in 1952, wearing the leader's yellow jersey before finishing fourth. The following year, 1954, he improved to second, and second in the mountains competition.

=== Tour de France ===
Hercules planned a team that would be the first from Britain to ride the Tour de France, then based on national teams. The riders in its colours grew season by season until in 1955 it had Robinson, Bernard Pusey, Dennis Talbot, Freddy Krebs, Clive Parker, Ken Joy, Arthur Ilsley, Derek Buttle (the founder of the team) and Dave Bedwell. The team raced in France, the Netherlands and Belgium in preparation. Robinson was eighth in Paris–Nice, fourth in La Flèche Wallonne and led the Tour of the Six Provinces to the sixth stage. The eventual Tour team was a mixture of Hercules riders and those from other sponsors. The Tour de France proved tough and only Robinson and Tony Hoar finished, Robinson 29th and Hoar lanterne rouge or last. They were the first Britons to finish the Tour, 18 years after Charles Holland and Bill Burl were the first Britons in the race in 1937.

In 1956, the Tour allowed mixed teams. Robinson joined a squad which included Charly Gaul. He took third on the first stage, and by the end of the Tour was 14th, Gaul 13th. He also rode the Vuelta a España in Hugo Koblet's Swiss-British team, and was second after the fourth stage. He punctured on a climb on the tenth stage when in a break with Italy's Angelo Conterno, the race winner, but managed to recover from eleventh to eighth.

=== Milan–San Remo ===
In 1957 he scored his first professional win, in the GP de la Ville de Nice, beating Louison Bobet by 50 seconds. Then he finished third in Milan–San Remo to Spain's Miguel Poblet, whose 29th birthday it was. Robinson crashed on wet cobbles early in the 1957 Tour de France, injuring his left wrist. He recovered to finish 15th in the world championship won by Rik Van Steenbergen.

=== First Tour stage win ===
In 1958, Robinson won stage seven of the Tour de France, to Brest. Arigo Padovan crossed the line first, but was relegated to second for his tactics in a hot sprint. Robinson won the 20th stage (from Annecy to Chalon-sur-Saône) of the 1959 Tour by 20 minutes. Next day he trailed far behind the field with his Irish teammate, Seamus Elliott, beside him. Both finished outside the time limit and expected to be sent home. The team's manager, Sauveur Ducazeaux, insisted the judges apply a rule that no rider in the first ten could be eliminated. (Note: The rule was created in 1926 when a single rider, Lucien Buysse, eliminated the entire field. He finished so far ahead that everyone else was outside the limit. The organiser, Henri Desgrange, extended the day's limit to 40 per cent of the winner's time and ruled that nobody in the first 10 could be eliminated.) Robinson had started the day ninth: it was Elliott who was sent home. Robinson finished the Tour in 19th position.

Robinson finished 26th and 53rd in the Tours of 1960 and 1961. In between he won the 1961 Critérium du Dauphiné Libéré, winning two stages. He was part of the winning team in the team time-trial, then third in the individual time trial at Romans. He won the following day's stage at Villefranche. He kept control of the race as it passed through the mountains and won the race.

== Retirement ==
Robinson retired when he was 33. The magazine Cycling placed Robinson ninth best British rider of the 20th century.

Robinson, at 74, helped organise a dinner in August 2005 to mark the 50th anniversary of the first British competitors in the Tour de France. The event aimed to attract all British riders who have raced in the Tour since 1955. In 2009, he was inducted into the British Cycling Hall of Fame.

Robinson's daughter Louise became a cyclo-cross rider, taking a silver medal at the 2000 UCI Cyclo-cross World Championships. Two of Brian's grandchildren are also competitive racing cyclists: Jake Womersley competing in cyclo-cross and road racing and Becky Womersley in road racing.

On 16 July 2014, Robinson was knocked off his bike in a collision with a car driver whilst riding through Thornhill Lees, suffering a fractured collar bone, six broken ribs, a punctured lung. Robinson was awarded the British Empire Medal in the 2017 New Year Honours for services to charity and cycling.

Robinson died on 25 October 2022, nine days before his 92nd birthday.

== Career achievements ==
=== Major results ===
1951
1st Overall Dublin–Galway–Dublin

1st Stage 1

1952
1st National Hill Climb Championships
1953
4th Overall Tour of Britain
5th Overall Tour of Ireland
1954
1st Stage 6 Tour d'Europe
2nd Overall Tour of Britain
1955
1st Tour of Pennines
4th La Flèche Wallonne
8th Overall Paris–Nice
1956
8th Overall Vuelta a España
9th Critérium des As
1957
3rd Milan–San Remo
4th Overall Tour de Luxembourg
4th Overall Tour de l'Ouest
4th Overall Tour de Picardie
8th Overall Paris–Nice
10th Bordeaux–Paris
1958
1st Stage 7 Tour de France
1st Pursuit & Omnium, de Guecho (with Jacques Anquetil)
1st Mountains classification Paris–Nice
5th Overall Tour du Sud-Est

1st Stage 5

5th Mont Faron Hill Climb
1959
1st Stage 20 Tour de France
3rd Manx Trophy
1960
1st Stage 3 Midi Libre
7th Overall Tour de l'Aude

1st Stage 2

1961
1st Overall Critérium du Dauphiné Libéré

1st Stages 2b (TTT) & 3

2nd Overall Circuit d'Auvergne

1st Stage 2

1st Stage 8 Midi Libre

=== Grand Tour general classification results timeline ===
Grand Tour	1955	1956	1957	1958	1959	1960	1961
Vuelta a España	—	8	—	—	DNF	—	—
Giro d'Italia	—	—	—	—	—	—	—
Tour de France	29	14	DNF	DNF	19	56	23

Legend
—	Did not compete
DNF	Did not finish

=== Awards and honours ===
- British Cycling Hall of Fame: 2009

== See also ==
- List of British cyclists

== Bibliography ==
- McGann, Bill; McGann, Carol (2006). The Story of the Tour De France, Volume 1: 1903–1964. Indianapolis, IN: Dog Ear Publishing. ISBN 978-1-59858-180-5.
- Woodland, Les (2007) [1st. pub. 2003]. The Yellow Jersey Companion to the Tour de France. London: Yellow Jersey Press. ISBN 978-0-224-08016-3.

Sporting positions
Preceded by Jean Dotto	Winner of Critérium du Dauphiné Libéré; 1961	Succeeded by Raymond Mastrotto
