= Henri Perly =

French cyclist (1928–2023)

Personal information
- Born: 27 February 1928 La Chapelle-au-Riboul, France
- Died: 26 September 2023 (aged 95)

Cycling career
- Sport: Cycling

Amateur teams
- 1945–1946: VC Mayennais
- 1947–1953: US La Chapelle-au-Riboul
- 1954: VC Pontlieue
- 1955–1959: Pédale Mancelle

Professional teams
- 1952: Alcyon
- 1953: Individual
- 1954: Terrot-Hutchinson
- 1955: Arrow
- 1955–1956: Arliguie-Hutchinson
- 1956–1957: Alcyon

Henri Perly (27 February 1928 – 26 September 2023) was a French cyclist.

Perly became a professional in 1952 as a criterium rider. He nearly won the Tour de l'Ouest before giving up in the last stage. In 1955, he finished seventh in the Paris–Nice.

Perly died on 26 September 2023, at the age of 95.

== Awards ==
- 3rd place in the Circuit des Trois Provinces (1948)
- Winner of the 13th and 15th stages of the Route de France (1951)
- Winner of the 2nd stage of the Tour de l'Oise (1952)
- 7th place in the Paris–Nice (1955)
- Winner of the 3rd stage of the Circuit de la Sarthe (1956)
- Winner of the Circuit des Trois Provinces (1956)
- Winner of the 2nd stage of the Tour d'Eure-et-Loir (1957)
- Winner of the Circuit des Deux Provinces (1957)
- Winner of the 2nd stage of the Circuit de la Sarther (1958)
