= 1955 Paris–Nice =

Race details
- Dates: 12–16 March 1955
- Stages: 5
- Distance: 1,140 km (708.4 mi)
- Winning time: 29h 58' 04"

Results
| Jersey awarded to the overall winner | Winner | Jean Bobet (FRA) |
| | Second | Pierre Molinéris (FRA) |
| | Third | Bernard Gauthier (FRA) |

The 1955 Paris–Nice was the 13th edition of the Paris–Nice cycle race and was held from 12 March to 16 March 1955. The race started in Paris and finished in Nice. The race was won by Jean Bobet.

== General classification ==
Final general classification

| Rank | Rider | Time |
|---|---|---|
| 1 | Jean Bobet (FRA) | 29h 58' 04" |
| 2 | Pierre Molinéris (FRA) | + 1' 18" |
| 3 | Bernard Gauthier (FRA) | + 1' 18" |
| 4 | Raphaël Géminiani (FRA) | + 1' 18" |
| 5 | Antonin Rolland (FRA) | + 1' 18" |
| 6 | René Privat (FRA) | + 1' 18" |
| 7 | Henri Perly (FRA) | + 1' 53" |
| 8 | Brian Robinson (GBR) | + 2' 07" |
| 9 | Lucien Lazaridès (FRA) | + 2' 07" |
| 10 | Germain Derycke (BEL) | + 2' 24" |
