= 1961 Critérium du Dauphiné Libéré =

Race details
- Dates: 29 May – 4 June 1961
- Stages: 7
- Distance: 1,500 km (930 mi)
- Winning time: 41h 08' 34"

Results
Jersey awarded to the overall winner	Winner	Brian Robinson (GBR)	(Saint-Raphaël–R. Geminiani–Dunlop)
	Second	Raymond Mastrotto (FRA)	(Saint-Raphaël–R. Geminiani–Dunlop)
	Third	François Mahé (FRA)	(Alcyon–Leroux)
Jersey awarded to the points classification winner	Points	Fernand Picot (FRA)	(Mercier–BP–Hutchinson)
Jersey awarded to the mountains classification winner	Mountains	Fernando Manzaneque (ESP)	(Licor 43)
	Team	Saint-Raphaël–R. Geminiani–Dunlop	

The 1961 Critérium du Dauphiné Libéré was the 15th edition of the cycle race and was held from 29 May to 4 June 1961. The race started in Avignon and finished in Grenoble. The race was won by Brian Robinson of the Saint-Raphaël–R. Geminiani–Dunlop team.

== General classification ==
Final general classification

Rank	Rider	Team	Time
1	Brian Robinson (GBR)	Saint-Raphaël–R. Geminiani–Dunlop	41h 08' 34"
2	Raymond Mastrotto (FRA)	Saint-Raphaël–R. Geminiani–Dunlop	+ 6' 12"
3	François Mahé (FRA)	Alcyon–Leroux	+ 7' 11"
4	Rolf Wolfshohl (FRG)	Saint-Raphaël–R. Geminiani–Dunlop	+ 7' 30"
5	Gérard Thiélin (FRA)	Saint-Raphaël–R. Geminiani–Dunlop	+ 9' 29"
6	Manuel Busto (FRA)	Peugeot–BP–Dunlop	+ 10' 36"
7	Fernando Manzaneque (ESP)	Licor 43	+ 10' 55"
8	René Privat (FRA)	Mercier–BP–Hutchinson	+ 11' 17"
9	Pierre Ruby (FRA)	Peugeot–BP–Dunlop	+ 11' 44"
10	Antonio Karmany (ESP)	Kas–Royal Asport	+ 12' 29"
