= Olivier Asmaker =

French cyclist (born 1973)

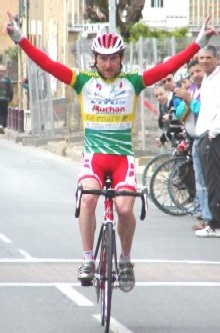
- Asmaker's solo win on the amateur Grand Prix of Vougy 2004

Personal information
- Born: 13 March 1973 (age 53) Savigny-sur-Orge, France

Cycling career
- Sport: Cycling
- Discipline: Road
- Role: Rider

Amateur teams
- 1995–1997: US Montauban
- 2003–2005: US Montauban

Professional teams
- 1997–1999: TVM–Farm Frites
- 2000: Festina
- 2001–2002: CSC–Tiscali

Major wins
- Tour de Picardie (2001), 1 stage

Olivier Asmaker (born 13 March 1973) is a French former racing cyclist. He was born in Savigny-sur-Orge, near Paris, but spent his childhood in Rodez.

== Career ==
A brilliant amateur rider who won the 1997 Coupe de France Amateurs with his team of Montauban, he began cycling as professional on 1 September 1997 in the Belgian team TVM–Farm Frites. Three seasons of training followed from there, during which he took part in many major races, such as the Tour of Flanders, Giro d'Italia and the Critérium du Dauphiné Libéré. His results during these years were rather modest: a fifth place in the Grand Prix du Midi Libre's stage and a fourteenth place in the Grand Prix de Wallonie.

At the end of his contract at the end of the 2000 season, Laurent Jalabert held one hand to Olivier by helping him to join the new Danish team CSC–Tiscali, which was his best season. He took part in a high number of races from the Tour Down Under in Australia in January to Paris–Tours in October.

On 18 May 2001, in the first stage of the Tour de Picardie, Asmaker was in a breakaway with several other well known riders, such as David Millar, Sylvain Chavanel, Robbie McEwen, Baden Cooke or Iñigo Landaluze. Asmaker attacked in the last kilometre and won the stage. He took the leader's jersey and kept it until the end of the race, in spite of the unceasing attacks of David Millar.

CSC-Tiscali obtained an invitation for the Tour de France thanks to his performance partly. But in a short descent of stage 1 of the Grand Prix du Midi Libre, he fell and broke his collarbone, so was unable to start the race.

In 2002, he raced a lot with his friend Laurent Jalabert. On April, he finished third in the Tour de Picardie. He was not selected to ride the Tour de France, after being replaced.

He raced his last race as professional was in the 2002 Paris–Tours, where he was part of a 150 kilometre breakaway with his teammate Jakob Piil, who won the race ahead of Jacky Durand.

At the end of the season, his contract wasn't renewed. He sought out another team, but was unable to find one. In 2003, he returned in the amateurs with the US Montauban team. On his first race, he won the GP de Montastruc ahead of the best riders of the Pyrenees region. The following year, he won the GP of Vougy solo and the first stage of the Tour des Deux-Sèvres.

At the end of the 2005 season, he ended his career to devote himself to his future job as a policeman near Toulouse.

== Major results ==
2001
1st Overall Tour de Picardie

1st Stage 1

2002
2nd Boucles de l'Aulne
3rd Overall Tour de Picardie

=== Results on the Giro d'Italia ===
- 1999 : DNF on stage 19
