= Dave Rayner (cyclist) =

English racing cyclist

Personal information
- Full name: David John Rayner
- Born: 4 March 1967 Shipley, England, United Kingdom
- Died: 16 November 1994 (aged 27)

Cycling career
- Sport: Cycling
- Discipline: Road
- Role: Rider

Amateur teams
- 1979–1983: East Bradford CC
- 1984: Bradford Wheelers - Ellis Briggs - Saturne
- 1984–1986: G.S.Porcari-Fanini-Berti

Professional teams
- 1987: Interent-Yugo
- 1988–1989: Raleigh-Banana
- 1990: Banana-Falcon
- 1991–1992: Buckler
- 1993: I.M.E.-Health Share
- 1994: Lex-Townsend

David John Rayner (1967–1994) was an English professional racing cyclist. He died aged 27 after an incident outside the Maestro nightclub, in Manningham Lane, Bradford. He was put on a life support machine at Bradford Royal Infirmary but died the next day.

== Cycling career ==
Rayner joined his first club, East Bradford CC, at 12 in 1979. He then joined the Bradford Wheelers - Ellis Briggs - Saturne in 1984, and won the national junior road race championships at Stoke on Trent. Early in 1984, he moved to Italy, joining the G.S.Porcari-Fanini-Berti Team, with which he stayed until 1986.

Rayner competed in the junior world championship in 1985.

After winning the under-22 award in the Milk Race in 1987, he turned professional for Interent-Yugo in Britain. In 1988 he joined Raleigh-Banana, won the under-22 award again in the Milk Race, and came eighth overall. Next year he won the under-22 award for a record third year running. He joined Banana-Falcon in 1990 and in won the Scottish Provident Criterium Series .

Rayner moved to the Netherlands in 1991 to ride for Buckler under former world champion Jan Raas. He joined I.M.E.-Health Share in 1993, moving to the United States. He returned to Britain in 1994 after an unsuccessful year and joined Lex-Townsend, coming second in the national criterium championships in Milford Haven.

== Death ==
Rayner died following an altercation with a bouncer, Steven Barry Johnson, at a nightclub in Bradford, in November 1994. Johnson was charged with manslaughter but, when the case came to court on 18 November 1995, the judge decided that there was not enough evidence to charge him with manslaughter and, having already pleaded guilty to a charge of common assault, Johnson was instead put on probation and ordered to complete 100 hours of community service.

== Memorial fund ==
The Dave Rayner Fund was set up in his memory on 12 January 1995, to help riders make a career from racing on the continent. A plaque and seat in his memory were unveiled at Gargrave, North Yorkshire on 9 July the same year. The first Rayners Ride around the Yorkshire Dales was held on 10 September and the first Dave Rayner dinner was held at Norfolk Gardens, Bradford on 4 November. Guests at the dinner were the comedian Tony Capstick, journalist John Morgan and Keith Audas. This dinner has become an annual event with guests such as Miguel Indurain, Bradley Wiggins, Mark Cavendish, and Eddy Merckx attending.

David Millar became the first beneficiary of the fund. He went on to turn professional with Cofidis. More recent beneficiaries who have joined the professional peloton include Adam Yates and Dan McLay.

== Palmarès ==
1985
14th Junior World Road Race Championships
5th Junior World Team Time Trial Championships, Stuttgart
1987
1st Under 22 award, Milk Race
1988
8th Overall, Milk Race

1st Under 22 award, Milk Race

1989
8th Overall, Milk Race

1st Under 22 award, Milk Race

1990
1st Scottish Provident Criterium Series
1991
57th Overall, Vuelta a España
1994
2nd British National Circuit Race Championships
