= 2012 Tour de Picardie =

2012 UCI Europe Tour, race 15 of 27
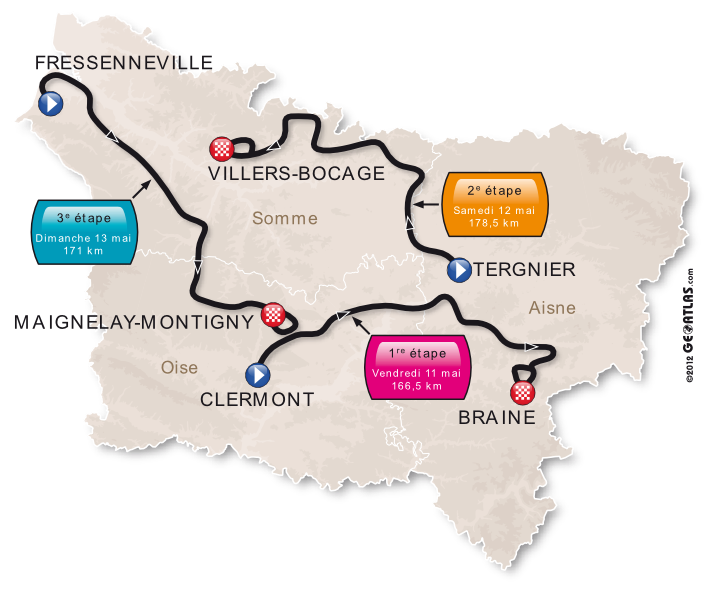
- The route of the 2012 Tour de Picardie

Race details
- Dates: 11–13 May
- Stages: 3
- Distance: 516 km (321 mi)
- Winning time: 12h 09' 59"

Results
Jersey awarded to the overall winner	Winner	John Degenkolb (Germany)	(Argos–Shimano)
	Second	Kenny van Hummel (Netherlands)	(Vacansoleil–DCM)
	Third	Leonardo Duque (Colombia)	(Cofidis)
Jersey awarded to the points classification winner	Points	John Degenkolb (Germany)	(Argos–Shimano)
Jersey awarded to the mountains classification winner	Mountains	Leonardo Duque (Colombia)	(Cofidis)
	Team	Team Europcar	

The 2012 Tour de Picardie was the 66th edition of the Tour de Picardie cycling stage race. It started on 11 May in Clermont and ended on 13 May in Maignelay-Montigny and consisted of three stages.

The race was won by Argos-Shimano rider John Degenkolb, who claimed the leader's yellow jersey after winning the first and the third stage. His winning margin over runner-up Kenny van Hummel of Vacansoleil-DCM was 10 seconds, and Cofidis' Leonardo Duque completed the podium, 15 seconds down on Degenkolb.

In the race's other classifications, Argos-Shimano rider John Degenkolb won the points classification's green jersey. Cofidis rider Leonardo Duque King of the Mountains classification, with Team Europcar finishing at the head of the teams classification.

== Stages ==
=== 1 ===
11 May 2012 – Clermont to Braine, 166.5 km

Stage Result and General Classification after Stage

	Rider	Team	Time
1	John Degenkolb (GER)	Argos–Shimano	3h 49' 11"
2	Takashi Miyazawa (JPN)	Saxo Bank–Tinkoff Bank	st"
3	Sébastien Chavanel (FRA)	Team Europcar	st"

	Rider	Team	Time
1	John Degenkolb (GER)	Argos–Shimano	3h 49' 01"
2	Takashi Miyazawa (JPN)	Saxo Bank–Tinkoff Bank	+ 4"
3	Sébastien Chavanel (FRA)	Team Europcar	+ 6"

=== 2 ===
12 May 2012 – Tergnier to Villers-Bocage, 178.5 km

Stage Result and General Classification after Stage

	Rider	Team	Time
1	Kenny van Hummel (NED)	Vacansoleil–DCM	4h 15' 47"
2	Stéphane Poulhies (FRA)	Saur–Sojasun	st"
3	John Degenkolb (GER)	Argos–Shimano	st"

	Rider	Team	Time
1	John Degenkolb (GER)	Argos–Shimano	8h 04' 44"
2	Kenny van Hummel (NED)	Vacansoleil–DCM	+ 4"
3	Takashi Miyazawa (JPN)	Saxo Bank–Tinkoff Bank	+ 8"

=== 3 ===
13 May 2012 – Fressenneville to Maignelay-Montigny, 171 km

Stage Result and General Classification after Stage

	Rider	Team	Time
1	John Degenkolb (GER)	Argos–Shimano	4h 05' 01"
2	Greg Henderson (NZL)	Lotto–Belisol	st"
3	Kenny van Hummel (NED)	Vacansoleil–DCM	st"

	Rider	Team	Time
1	John Degenkolb (GER)	Argos–Shimano	12h 09' 35"
2	Kenny van Hummel (NED)	Vacansoleil–DCM	+ 10"
3	Leonardo Duque (COL)	Cofidis	+ 15"

== Classification leadership ==
Stage	Winner	General classification	Points classification	King of the Mountains	Team classification in the Tour de France
1	John Degenkolb	John Degenkolb	John Degenkolb	Jonathan Hivert	Team Europcar
2	Kenny van Hummel	John Degenkolb	John Degenkolb	Jonathan Hivert	Team Europcar
3	John Degenkolb	John Degenkolb	John Degenkolb	Leonardo Duque	Team Europcar
Final		John Degenkolb	John Degenkolb	Leonardo Duque	Team Europcar

== Winners ==
=== General classification ===
	Rider	Team	Time
1	John Degenkolb (GER)	Argos–Shimano	12h 09' 35"
2	Kenny van Hummel (NED)	Vacansoleil–DCM	+ 10"
3	Leonardo Duque (COL)	Cofidis	+ 15"

=== Points ===
	Rider	Team	Time
1	John Degenkolb (GER)	Argos–Shimano	70 points
2	Kenny van Hummel (NED)	Vacansoleil–DCM	52 points
3	Benoit Drujon (FRA)	Auber 93	48 points

=== Mountains ===
	Rider	Team	Time
1	Leonardo Duque (COL)	Cofidis	12 points
2	Jonathan Hivert (FRA)	Saur–Sojasun	8 points
3	Jesus Herrada Lopez (ESP)	Movistar Team	7 points

=== Team ===
Pos.	Team	Time
1	Team Europcar	36h 29' 57"
2	Auber 93	st″
3	Landbouwkrediet–Euphony	st″

== See also ==
- https://web.archive.org/web/20110623140759/http://www.letour.fr/fr/homepage_courseTDO.html
