= Jonathan Hivert =

French road bicycle racer

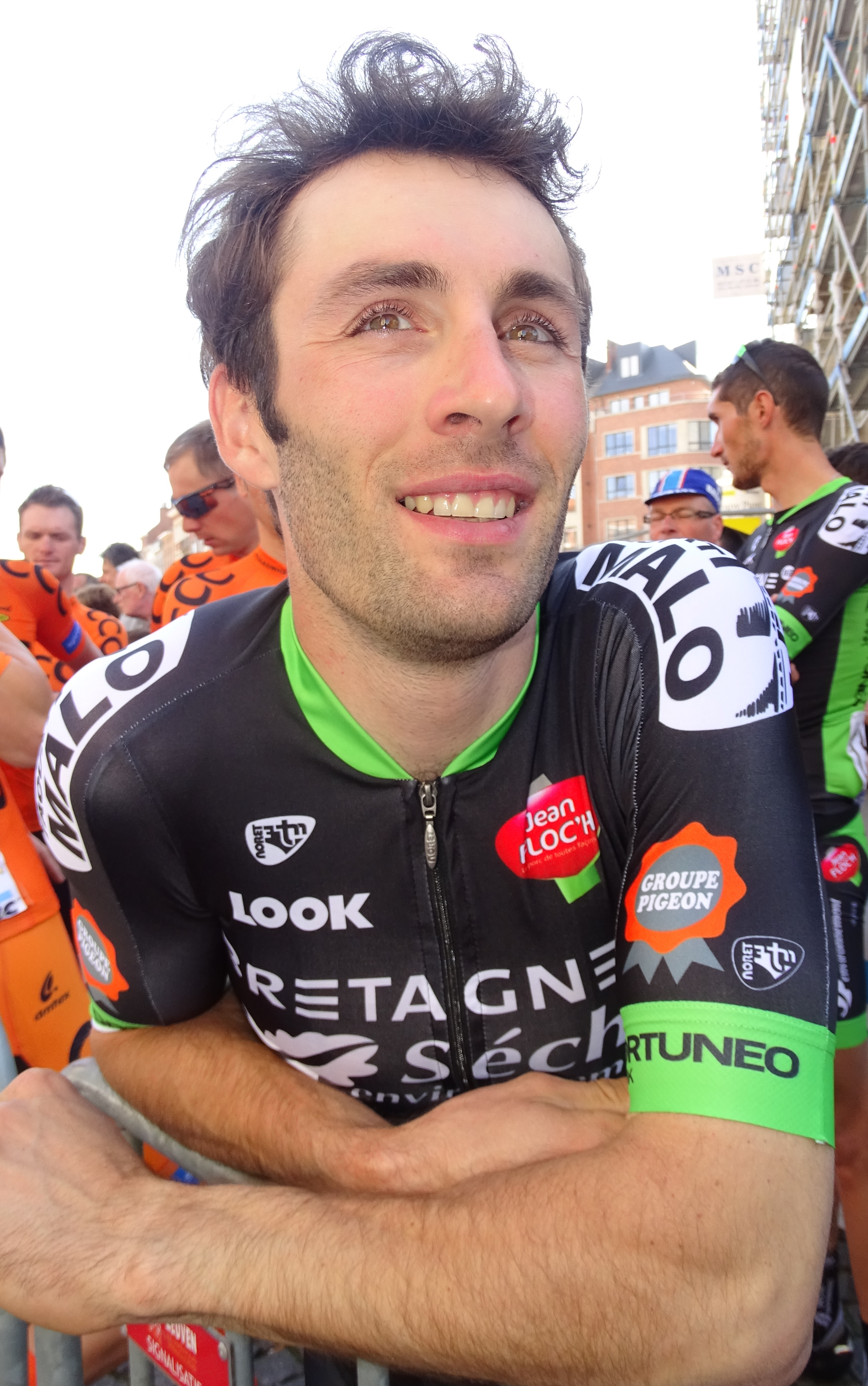
- Hivert in 2015

Personal information
- Full name: Jonathan Hivert
- Born: 23 March 1985 (age 41) Chambray-lès-Tours, France
- Height: 1.70 m (5 ft 7 in)
- Weight: 62 kg (137 lb)

Cycling career
- Sport: Cycling
- Current team: B&B Hotels p/b KTM
- Discipline: Road
- Role: Rider
- Rider type: All-rounder

Amateur teams
- 2003: US Saint-Pierre-des-Corps
- 2004: Saint-Cyr sur Loire
- 2005: UC Châteauroux-Fenioux
- 2005: Crédit Agricole (stagiaire)

Professional teams
- 2006–2008: Crédit Agricole
- 2009: Skil–Shimano
- 2010–2013: Saur–Sojasun
- 2014: Belkin Pro Cycling
- 2015–2016: Bretagne–Séché Environnement
- 2017–2020: Direct Énergie
- 2021–2022: B&B Hotels p/b KTM

Jonathan Hivert (born 23 March 1985) is a former French professional road bicycle racer, who last rode for UCI ProTeam B&B Hotels p/b KTM.

== Career ==
In 2013, Chambray-lès-Tours Hivert won the general classification of the 2.1 event Étoile de Bessèges. He was 3 seconds in arrears of Jérôme Cousin of Team Europcar before the final time trial, and he finally got the first position after besting Cousin by 7 seconds on the stage. Hivert joined Belkin Pro Cycling for the 2014 season, after his previous team – Sojasun – folded at the end of the 2013 season.

In October 2020, he was named in the startlist for the 2020 Vuelta a España. In the same month, Hivert signed a two-year contract with the B&B Hotels–Vital Concept team, later renamed as B&B Hotels p/b KTM.

== Major results ==
2003
2nd Road race, National Junior Road Championships
2005
2nd Paris–Mantes-en-Yvelines
6th Liège–Bastogne–Liège U23
2007
5th Overall Tour de Luxembourg
2008
2nd Overall Circuit de Lorraine

1st Stage 1

6th Grand Prix d'Ouverture La Marseillaise
6th Tour du Doubs
10th Overall Étoile de Bessèges
10th Tour de Vendée
2009
5th Hel van het Mergelland
6th Overall Étoile de Bessèges
6th Grand Prix de Wallonie
8th Overall Paris–Nice
8th Grand Prix d'Ouverture La Marseillaise
2010
1st Grand Prix d'Ouverture La Marseillaise
2nd Tour du Doubs
3rd Tour de Vendée
4th Grand Prix d'Isbergues
9th Overall Paris–Corrèze
2011
1st Klasika Primavera
1st Paris–Troyes
1st Stage 2 Vuelta a Andalucía
2nd Overall Tour du Gévaudan
4th Boucles de l'Aulne
2012
1st Stage 2 Tour de Romandie
2nd Tour de Vendée
4th Overall Tour de Luxembourg
4th Paris–Bourges
6th Overall Tour du Haut Var
7th Cholet-Pays de Loire
8th Overall Étoile de Bessèges
8th Boucles du Sud Ardèche
8th Paris–Tours
9th Overall Tour de Picardie
2013
1st Overall Étoile de Bessèges
Vuelta a Andalucía

1st Stages 1 & 2

2nd Overall Tour de Luxembourg
2nd Grand Prix of Aargau Canton
5th Grand Prix de la Somme
7th Overall Circuit de la Sarthe
9th Vuelta a Murcia
2014
7th Classic Sud-Ardèche
8th Grand Prix Cycliste de Montréal
2015
3rd Overall Tour du Haut Var
5th Overall Tour du Gévaudan Languedoc-Roussillon
5th Grand Prix La Marseillaise
8th Tour du Finistère
9th Tour de Vendée
9th La Drôme Classic
2016
5th Coppa Sabatini
7th Giro dell'Emilia
9th Grand Prix de Wallonie
9th Tour de Vendée
10th Overall Tour de Wallonie
2017
1st Overall Vuelta a Castilla y León

1st Points classification
1st Stage 2

2nd Grand Prix de Plumelec-Morbihan
3rd Overall Tour de Yorkshire
4th Overall Tour La Provence
8th Overall Tour du Haut Var
8th La Drôme Classic
2018
1st Overall Tour du Haut Var

1st Points classification
1st Stages 1 & 2

1st Tour du Finistère
1st Stage 3 Paris–Nice
5th Overall Étoile de Bessèges
6th Tour de Vendée
6th La Drôme Classic
7th Grand Prix de Wallonie
8th Overall Tour La Provence
10th Overall Tour de Yorkshire
2019
1st GP Miguel Induráin
1st Stage 2 Vuelta a Aragón
4th Grand Prix de Wallonie
5th Classic Loire Atlantique
7th Tour du Doubs
9th Tour du Finistère
2021
8th Tour du Finistère
9th Faun-Ardèche Classic
2022
10th Clásica Jaén Paraíso Interior

=== Grand Tour general classification results timeline ===
Grand Tour	2009	2010	2011	2012	2013	2014	2015	2016	2017	2018	2019	2020
Giro d'Italia	Has not contested during his career											
Tour de France	154	—	97	—	151	—	—	—	—	—	—	—
Vuelta a España	—	—	—	—	—	—	—	—	—	—	—	86

Legend
—	Did not compete
DNF	Did not finish
