= Ellis Briggs =

British bicycle manufacturer

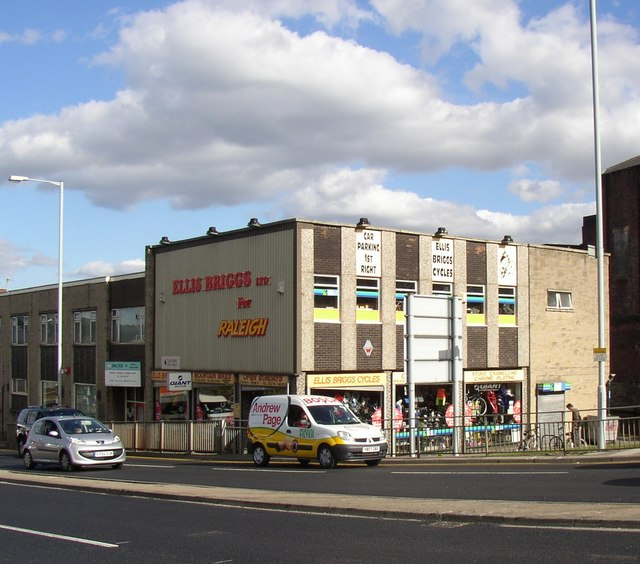
Ellis Briggs cycle shop on Otley Road, Shipley

Ellis Briggs is a British bicycle manufacturer and shop, based in Shipley, West Yorkshire, England. It is the oldest bicycle shop in the Bradford area still in business today. Ellis Briggs have produced lightweight bicycles since 1936 and continue to do so. Ellis Briggs sprang to fame when the cyclist Ken Russell won the 1952 Tour of Britain on an Ellis Briggs.

== History ==
Ellis Briggs Cycles was founded in 1936 by Mr. Leonard Ellis and Mr. Thomas Briggs hence the name Ellis-Briggs. When the shop opened in 1936 there was already a bicycle shop in Shipley. That shop was a showroom for Baines, whose factory was based in Idle and were famous for producing the Baines Flying Gate.

The shop survived through the war by selling what ever was available which included children's clothing and enamel paints, as well as the usual cycling lines. It was after the war when Ellis Briggs started building lightweight racing frames, which gained them much notoriety among racing cyclists. After Thomas Briggs died in 1953 his son Jack took over the business with his wife Nora.

Attention turned to the export markets of the US and Canada and during the 1960s, 1970s and 1980s hundreds of frames were exported to the other side of the Atlantic. In 1965 the shop and factory moved from the old premises into a brand new building across the road. Jack and Nora Briggs retired in 1986. Their two sons John and Paul, had been working in the shop since the 1960s, Paul as a mechanic and John as Salesman. John and Paul took over and have run the business ever since.

Over the years Ellis Briggs sponsored many international riders, such as Bernard Burns, Brian Robinson, Arthur Metcalfe, Ken Russell, Doug Petty, Danny Horton and Dave Rayner. The biggest success was in the 1950s when Ken Russell, riding for Ellis Briggs as an independent rider (semi professional), won the 1952 Tour of Britain despite not having any team support.

It traded for eighty years before it went into voluntary liquidation in May 2018. However the business was bought out of liquidation and is continuing to build traditional handmade bicycles and teach bicycle framebuilding courses.

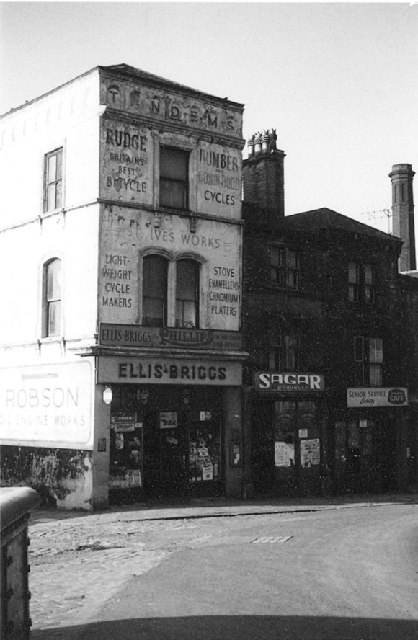
Earlier shop on Otley Road, Shipley

In recognition of the history of the firm, they were visited by the Princess Royal in January 2022.

== See also ==
- List of bicycle manufacturing companies
