= 2012 Kuurne–Brussels–Kuurne =

Race details
- Dates: 26 February
- Stages: 1
- Distance: 198 km (123.0 mi)
- Winning time: 4h 27' 30"

Results
	Winner	Mark Cavendish (GBR)	(Team Sky)
	Second	Yauheni Hutarovich (BLR)	(FDJ–BigMat)
	Third	Kenny van Hummel (NED)	(Vacansoleil–DCM)

The 2012 Kuurne–Brussels–Kuurne took place on 26 February 2012. It was the 65th edition of the international classic Kuurne–Brussels–Kuurne and was won by Mark Cavendish of Team Sky in a bunch sprint. The last escapees were caught by the peloton shortly after the 10 kilometers to go banner.

== Results ==
	Cyclist	Team	Time
1	Mark Cavendish (GBR)	Team Sky	4h 27' 30"
2	Yauheni Hutarovich (BLR)	FDJ–BigMat	s.t.
3	Kenny van Hummel (NED)	Vacansoleil–DCM	s.t.
4	Arnaud Démare (FRA)	FDJ–BigMat	s.t.
5	Alexander Serebryakov (RUS)	Team Type 1–Sanofi	s.t.
6	Tom Veelers (NED)	Project 1t4i	s.t.
7	Sébastien Chavanel (FRA)	Team Europcar	s.t.
8	Stefan van Dijk (NED)	Accent.jobs–Willems Veranda's	s.t.
9	Alexander Kristoff (NOR)	Team Katusha	s.t.
10	André Greipel (GER)	Lotto–Belisol	s.t.
