= 2019 Gent–Wevelgem =

2019 UCI World Tour, race 12 of 38
- Event poster with previous winner Peter Sagan

Race details
- Dates: 31 March 2019
- Stages: 1
- Distance: 251.5 km (156.3 mi)
- Winning time: 5h 26' 04"

Results
	Winner	Alexander Kristoff (NOR)	(UAE Team Emirates)
	Second	John Degenkolb (GER)	(Trek–Segafredo)
	Third	Oliver Naesen (BEL)	(AG2R La Mondiale)

The 2019 Gent–Wevelgem – In Flanders Fields was a Belgian road cycling one-day race that took place on 31 March 2019 over a distance of 251.5 kilometres between Deinze and Wevelgem. It was the 81st edition of Gent–Wevelgem and the 12th event of the 2019 UCI World Tour. It was won by Alexander Kristoff of UAE Team Emirates in the sprint.

The route of the 2019 Gent–Wevelgem

== Result ==
Result
Rank	Rider	Team	Time
1	Alexander Kristoff (NOR)	UAE Team Emirates	5h 26' 08"
2	John Degenkolb (GER)	Trek–Segafredo	+ 0"
3	Oliver Naesen (BEL)	AG2R La Mondiale	+ 0"
4	Mathieu van der Poel (NED)	Corendon–Circus	+ 0"
5	Danny van Poppel (NED)	Team Jumbo–Visma	+ 0"
6	Adrien Petit (FRA)	Direct Énergie	+ 0"
7	Matteo Trentin (ITA)	Mitchelton–Scott	+ 0"
8	Rüdiger Selig (GER)	Bora–Hansgrohe	+ 0"
9	Matej Mohorič (SLO)	Bahrain–Merida	+ 0"
10	Jens Debusschere (BEL)	Team Katusha–Alpecin	+ 0"
