= 2013 Paris–Tours =

2013 UCI Europe Tour

Race details
- Dates: 13 October 2013
- Stages: 1
- Distance: 235 km (146.0 mi)
- Winning time: 5h 29' 19"

Results
	Winner	John Degenkolb (GER)	(Argos–Shimano)
	Second	Michael Mørkøv (DEN)	(Saxo–Tinkoff)
	Third	Arnaud Démare (FRA)	(FDJ.fr)

The 2013 Paris–Tours was the 107th edition of this single day road bicycle racing event. John Degenkolb won the race from a mass sprint in front of Michael Mørkøv and Arnaud Démare.

== General standings ==
	Cyclist	Team	Time
1	John Degenkolb (GER)	Argos–Shimano	5h 29' 19"
2	Michael Mørkøv (DEN)	Saxo–Tinkoff	+ 0"
3	Arnaud Démare (FRA)	FDJ.fr	+ 0"
4	Tyler Farrar (USA)	Garmin–Sharp	+ 0"
5	Michael Van Staeyen (BEL)	Topsport Vlaanderen–Baloise	+ 0"
6	Heinrich Haussler (AUS)	IAM Cycling	+ 0"
7	Samuel Dumoulin (FRA)	Ag2r–La Mondiale	+ 0"
8	Jon Aberasturi (SPA)	Euskaltel–Euskadi	+ 0"
9	Ioannis Tamouridis (GRE)	Euskaltel–Euskadi	+ 0"
10	Niki Terpstra (NED)	Omega Pharma–Quick-Step	+ 0"
