= 2013 Vattenfall Cyclassics =

2013 UCI World Tour, race 23 of 28

Race details
- Dates: 25 August 2013
- Stages: 1
- Distance: 246 km (152.9 mi)
- Winning time: 5h 45' 16"

Results
	Winner	John Degenkolb (Germany)	(Argos–Shimano)
	Second	André Greipel (Germany)	(Lotto–Belisol)
	Third	Alexander Kristoff (Norway)	(Team Katusha)

The 2013 Vattenfall Cyclassics was the 18th running of the Vattenfall Cyclassics single-day cycling race. It was held, in and around Hamburg, Germany, on 25 August over a distance of 246 kilometres (152.9 miles) and was the twenty-third race of the 2013 UCI World Tour season.

In a mass sprint finish, the race was won by Argos–Shimano rider John Degenkolb, Degenkolb finished ahead of Lotto–Belisol's André Greipel and Team Katusha's Alexander Kristoff, who completed the podium.

== Teams ==
As the Vattenfall Cyclassics was a UCI World Tour event, all 19 UCI ProTeams were invited automatically and obligated to send a squad. Two other squads – NetApp–Endura and MTN–Qhubeka – were given wildcard places into the race and as such, formed the event's 21-team peloton.

The 21 teams that competed in the race were:

- Ag2r–La Mondiale
- Argos–Shimano
- Astana
- Belkin Pro Cycling
- BMC Racing Team
- Cannondale
- Euskaltel–Euskadi
- FDJ.fr
- Garmin–Sharp
- Team Katusha
- Lampre–Merida
- Lotto–Belisol
- Movistar Team
- MTN–Qhubeka †
- Omega Pharma–Quick-Step
- Orica–GreenEDGE
- RadioShack–Leopard †
- NetApp–Endura
- Saxo–Tinkoff
- Team Sky
- Vacansoleil–DCM

== Results ==
	Cyclist	Team	Time	UCI World Tour Points
1	John Degenkolb (GER)	Argos–Shimano	5h 45' 16"	80
2	André Greipel (GER)	Lotto–Belisol	s.t.	60
3	Alexander Kristoff (NOR)	Team Katusha	+ 1"	50
4	José Joaquín Rojas (ESP)	Movistar Team	+ 1"	40
5	Elia Viviani (ITA)	Cannondale	+ 1"	30
6	Boy Van Poppel (NLD)	Vacansoleil–DCM	+ 1"	22
7	Nikolas Maes (BEL)	Omega Pharma–Quick-Step	+ 1"	14
8	Thor Hushovd (NOR)	BMC Racing Team	+ 1"	10
9	Matti Breschel (DNK)	Saxo–Tinkoff	+ 1"	6
10	Arnaud Démare (FRA)	FDJ.fr	+ 1"	2
