= John Degenkolb =

German racing cyclist

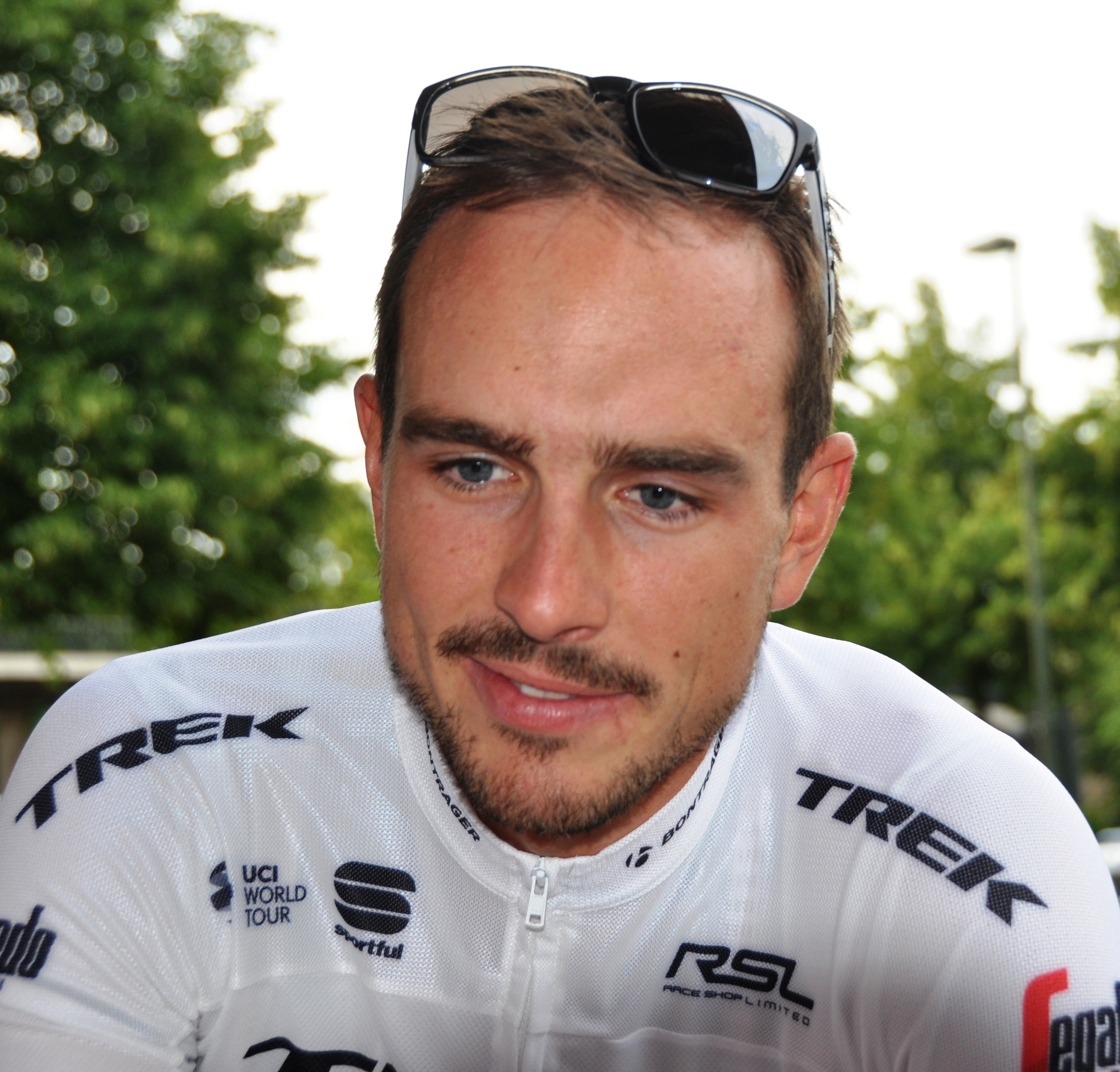
- Degenkolb at the 2017 Tour de France

Personal information
- Full name: John Degenkolb
- Born: 7 January 1989 (age 37) Gera, East Germany
- Height: 1.80 m (5 ft 11 in)
- Weight: 77 kg (170 lb; 12 st 2 lb)

Cycling career
- Sport: Cycling
- Current team: Team Picnic–PostNL
- Discipline: Road
- Role: Rider
- Rider type: Classics rider Sprinter

Amateur team
- 2008–2010: Thüringer Energie Team

Professional teams
- 2011: HTC–Highroad
- 2012–2016: Project 1t4i
- 2017–2019: Trek–Segafredo
- 2020–2021: Lotto–Soudal
- 2022–: Team DSM

Major wins
- Grand Tours Tour de France 1 individual stage (2018) Giro d'Italia 1 individual stage (2013) Vuelta a España Points classification (2014) 10 individual stages (2012, 2014, 2015) One-day races and Classics Milan–San Remo (2015) Paris–Roubaix (2015) Gent–Wevelgem (2014) Paris–Tours (2013) Vattenfall Cyclassics (2013) Eschborn–Frankfurt City Loop (2011) Münsterland Giro (2016) Other UCI Europe Tour (2012)
Medal record
Representing Germany
World Championships
Silver medal – second place	2010 Melbourne	Under-23 road race
Bronze medal – third place	2008 Varese	Under-23 road race

John Degenkolb (born 7 January 1989) is a German professional road bicycle racer, who rides for UCI WorldTeam Team Picnic–PostNL. His biggest wins to date are the 2015 Milan–San Remo and the 2015 Paris–Roubaix, two of cycling's five monuments. He is a winner of stages in all three Grand Tours, with ten stages and the points classification at the Vuelta a España, one stage of the Giro d'Italia, and one stage in the Tour de France.

In 2010 he won his first stage race, the Thüringen Rundfahrt der U23, and finished second in the under 23 race at the UCI Road World Championships. Degenkolb also took victory in the 2014 Gent–Wevelgem, the 2013 Vattenfall Cyclassics and was the overall winner of the 2012 UCI Europe Tour.

== Professional career ==
=== HTC–Highroad (2011) ===
In 2011, Degenkolb turned professional with the UCI World Tour HTC–Highroad squad, following in the footsteps of other notable sprinters such as Mark Cavendish and André Greipel. In his debut season in the professional ranks he won stages at the Volta ao Algarve, the Three Days of West Flanders and the Bayern Rundfahrt before winning two stages of the Critérium du Dauphiné. He also won the Eschborn–Frankfurt – Rund um den Finanzplatz one day race.

=== Project 1t4i / Giant–Alpecin (2012–2016) ===
==== 2012 ====
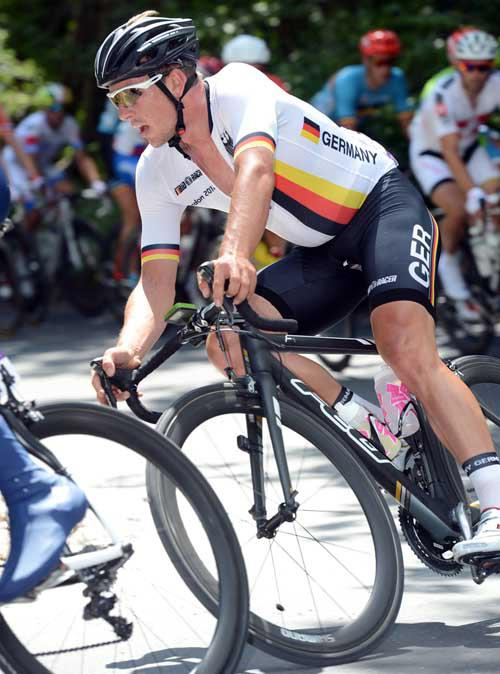
Degenkolb at the 2012 Olympic road race

Following the disbanding of the HTC team at the end of 2011, Degenkolb moved to UCI Professional Continental team, Project 1t4i.

Degenkolb won the overall classification of the Tour de Picardie, where he prevailed in the first and third stages of the 3-stage race. The time bonuses helped him secure the overall win.

On 19 August, Degenkolb took his first stage win on a Grand Tour, stage 2 of the Vuelta a España concluding in Viana. On the slightly rising finish, he crossed the line before Allan Davis of Orica–GreenEDGE and Team Sky's Ben Swift. He repeated the exploit on stage 5, a flat affair in Logroño. Degenkolb came around Daniele Bennati, who had opened a decent gap in the last 200 m (660 ft), and crossed the line with a slight margin over the RadioShack–Nissan rider.

With the points classification jersey on his shoulders, he took his third win on stage 7, which came to an end with a lap around the Motorland Aragón race circuit. After what he qualified as a pretty mellow race on stage 10, Degenkolb came out as the victor again in Sanxenxo, sprinting hard on the uphill false-flat, edging Frenchman Nacer Bouhanni of FDJ–BigMat. He finished the Vuelta with five victories, including the coveted last stage in Madrid, where he concluded his second participation in a Grand Tour with another win.

Degenkolb followed these successes with another sprint victory at the Grand Prix d'Isbergues and a fourth place in the hilly UCI Road World Championships in Valkenburg, behind winner Philippe Gilbert of Belgium.

==== 2013 ====
Degenkolb's credentials in 2013 started in May with a stage victory at the Giro d'Italia, his first win in the Italian Grand Tour. For the Tour de France, Degenkolb acted as a lead-out man for his teammate Marcel Kittel, who won four stages. Degenkolb then went on to win the Vattenfall Cyclassics World Tour race in his homeland, beating André Greipel to the line. In October, Degenkolb won two races on French soil in less than a week, Paris–Bourges and then the 1.HC Paris–Tours.

==== 2014 ====
In 2014, Degenkolb most notably won the Belgian classic Gent–Wevelgem ahead of Arnaud Démare and Peter Sagan. During the Paris–Nice stage race, he won stage 3 from a bunch sprint, temporarily taking over the race lead, and went on to win the overall points classification. He also earned the points classification and 3 stages of the Tour Méditerranéen and 4 stages of the Vuelta a España. The first stage he won contained two categorised climbs and was raced in oven-like heat. The second one was a massive sprint where FDJ rider Nacer Bouhanni complained he had been unfairly pushed to the barriers by Degenkolb, who still retained the victory. The third success was a 'crazy finish' according to Degenkolb, who had the better of second placed Tom Boonen. The fourth victory came on Stage 17 and saw him edge Michael Matthews for the line. Right after the Vuelta and conquering the points classification jersey, Degenkolb had to be hospitalized for a lymphatic infection.

==== 2015: Milan–San Remo and Paris–Roubaix double ====
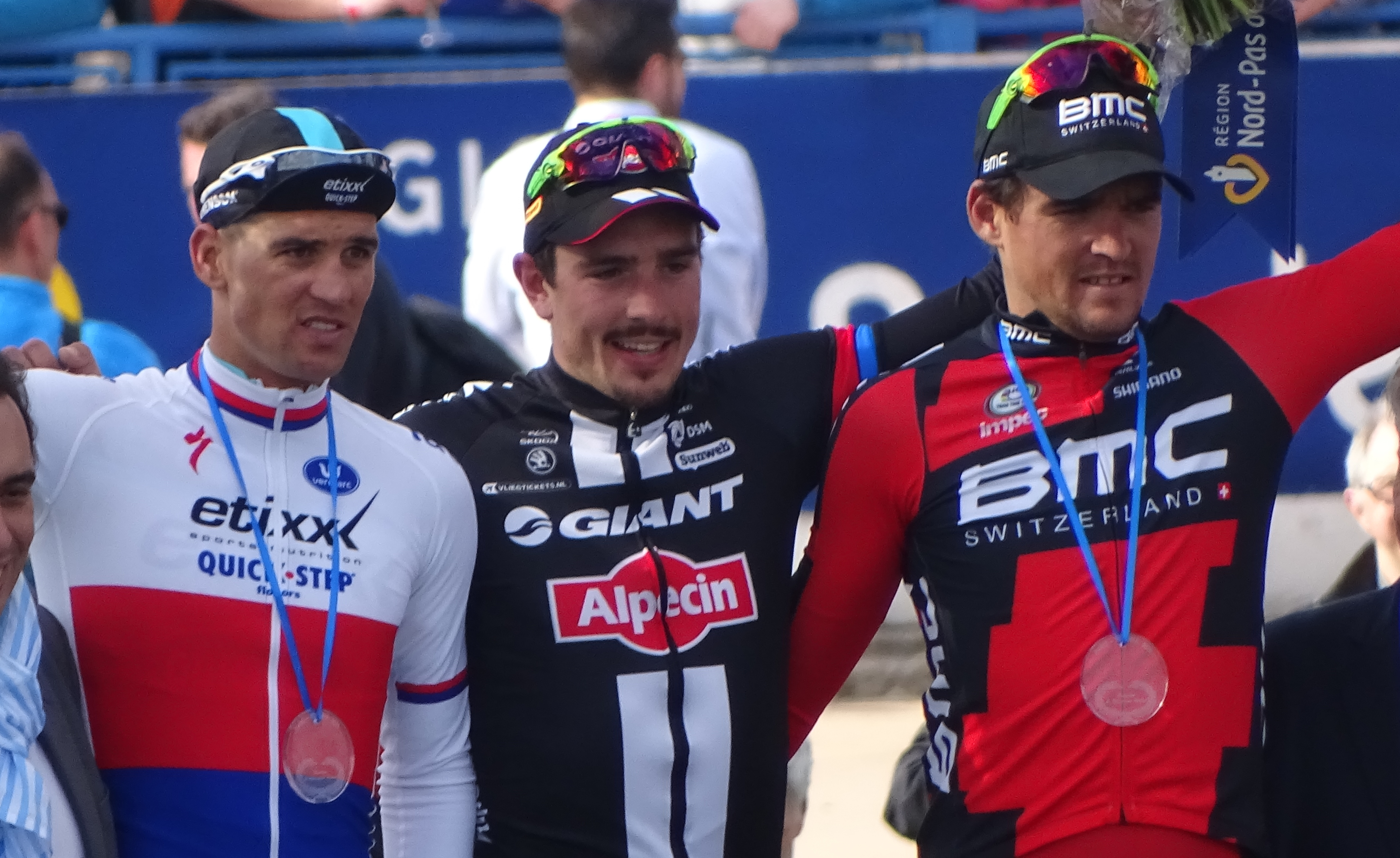
Degenkolb (centre) on the podium after winning the 2015 Paris–Roubaix

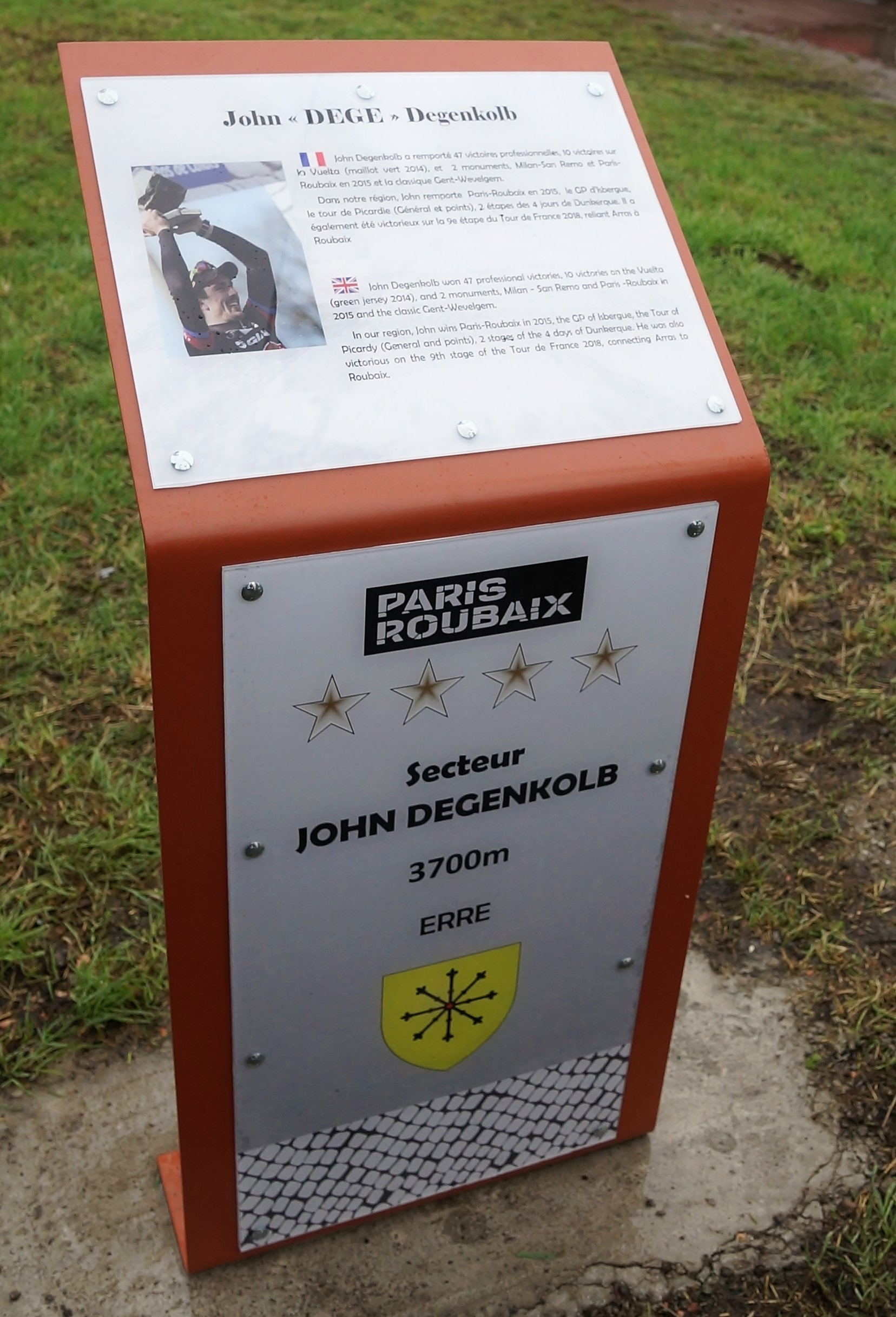
Plaque at the cobbled sector of Paris–Roubaix named after Degenkolb

In 2015, Degenkolb won his first race at the Dubai Tour, the third stage of the race, beating Alejandro Valverde up a 17 percent gradient final climb. He also moved into the lead of the general classification, but lost it on the final day to Mark Cavendish, finishing the race in second overall. He grabbed the biggest victory of his career at that point in March at Milan–San Remo, where he won the sprint in front of 2014 winner Alexander Kristoff. In April, he finished seventh at the Tour of Flanders, before winning the much coveted classic Paris–Roubaix just a few days later. In the final kilometres, he bridged the gap to two escapees and eventually won a group sprint of seven riders in the Roubaix Velodrome. He became the first German to win the race since Josef Fischer won the inaugural edition in 1896, and the first rider to win Milan–San Remo and Paris–Roubaix in the same year since Sean Kelly in 1986. In May, Degenkolb took two stage victories at the Bayern Rundfahrt, winning the points classification.

During the Tour de France, Degenkolb replaced an unfit Kittel as Giant–Alpecin's main sprinter and team captain. He would go on to describe his Tour as "satisfactory, yet not exactly what I had dreamed about", after placing in the top ten at eight different stages without winning one of them. This included a second-place finish on stage 4, which featured cobbled sections suiting the Paris–Roubaix winner. Degenkolb was seen at the front of the pack following attacks by Vincenzo Nibali over the pavé sections, but was ultimately beaten by a late attack of compatriot Tony Martin.

At the Vuelta a España, Degenkolb was elected as his team's captain. During the first two weeks of the race, stage wins eluded him, finishing high on several stages, including top three positions in stages 3, 5 and 10. When his teammate Tom Dumoulin unexpectedly challenged for the overall win, Degenkolb worked for the Dutchman, including an "astounding" performance during stage 19. On the mountainous terrain, he was able to stay with the top twenty riders of the pack until the end, setting up Dumoulin for an attack at the cobbled ascent to the finish line in Ávila. Degenkolb received praise for his performance, with directeur sportif Christian Guiberteau calling it "phenomenal". Degenkolb was able to win the last stage to Madrid, beating riders like Danny van Poppel in a bunch sprint.

Late in the season, Degenkolb targeted the road race at the UCI Road World Championships in Richmond, Virginia, being named in a leading duo with fellow sprinter André Greipel. He was considered by many to be able to challenge for the title. In the race itself, Degenkolb was placed at the front of the field for the better part of the latter laps of the race. On the cobbled climb up Libby Hill on the last lap, Degenkolb was the first to follow an attack by Zdeněk Štybar, but he was unable to follow the subsequent pace set by a group containing Niki Terpstra and Greg Van Avermaet, among others. He eventually finished 29th, 15 seconds down on winner Peter Sagan. Degenkolb said after the race: "Of course, I am very disappointed. When Peter Sagan attacked at the penultimate climb, I had nothing left to react." Degenkolb rounded up his 2015 season with a victory at the Saitama Criterium in Japan, beating local Fumiyuki Beppu (Trek Factory Racing) and Tour de France winner Chris Froome (Team Sky) in a sprint finish. Following the race, Degenkolb said: "It was a very great race, with so many spectators. They are super emotional, especially in the final the crowds were so loud and you can almost compare it to the Champs Elysees from the atmosphere and the noise on the said of the road [...]. Now the season is really finished for me and now the preparation for the new season starts."

==== 2016 ====
On 23 January 2016, while training in Calpe, Spain, he was one of six Team Giant–Alpecin riders who were hit by a car which drove into on-coming traffic. All riders were in stable condition. Degenkolb himself suffered cuts to the thigh, forearm and his lips, as well as coming close to losing his left index finger. He was treated in Valencia and Hamburg, but missed the spring classics season. He returned to competition at the Eschborn–Frankfurt – Rund um den Finanzplatz in Frankfurt on 1 May. Even though he did not finish the race, he said that he was "satisfied" with his performance and called the race an important first step in his recovery. He then attended the Tour of California, where he secured two top-ten stage finishes, declaring that he was happy with his progress, even though his injured finger was still a nuisance during sprints. He showed further improvement at the Critérium du Dauphiné, his first World Tour event of the year, finishing eighth on stage 4. Degenkolb started in the Tour de France in July, aiming particularly at the 16th stage ending in Bern. Eventually he came fourth in the mass sprints both on stages 14 and 16, his best results of the season up to that point.

On 8 July, Degenkolb announced he would leave Team Giant–Alpecin and join a new team for 2017 – with an announcement expected during the first rest day of the Tour de France. In August, his new team was confirmed to be Trek–Segafredo. He took his first win of the season on 14 August in the final stage of the Arctic Race of Norway, also securing victory in the race's points classification. He followed this up with a second place at the EuroEyes Cyclassics in Hamburg, coming in behind Caleb Ewan in the bunch sprint.

At the UCI Road World Championships in Doha, Qatar, Degenkolb was part of the German team for the road race. Having initially succeeded in staying in the front group after an attack by the Belgian squad split the field early on in the race, a flat tyre forced Degenkolb to fall back into a second group. Here, Degenkolb tried to lead his team captain André Greipel back to the front, an effort disrupted by Belgian riders left his group, leading to Degenkolb at one point spraying water from his bidon on Jens Debusschere's face in frustration. Speaking about the incident after the race, Degenkolb declared: "Oh, Jens asked for refreshment and I granted his wish." After retiring from the race due to exhaustion with 40 km (25 mi) to go, Degenkolb summarised his season: "That was a shit season this year. But I am still alive, life goes on." He then ended his season at the Abu Dhabi Tour, where he came second to Giacomo Nizzolo on stage one.

=== Trek–Segafredo (2017–2019) ===
==== 2017 ====
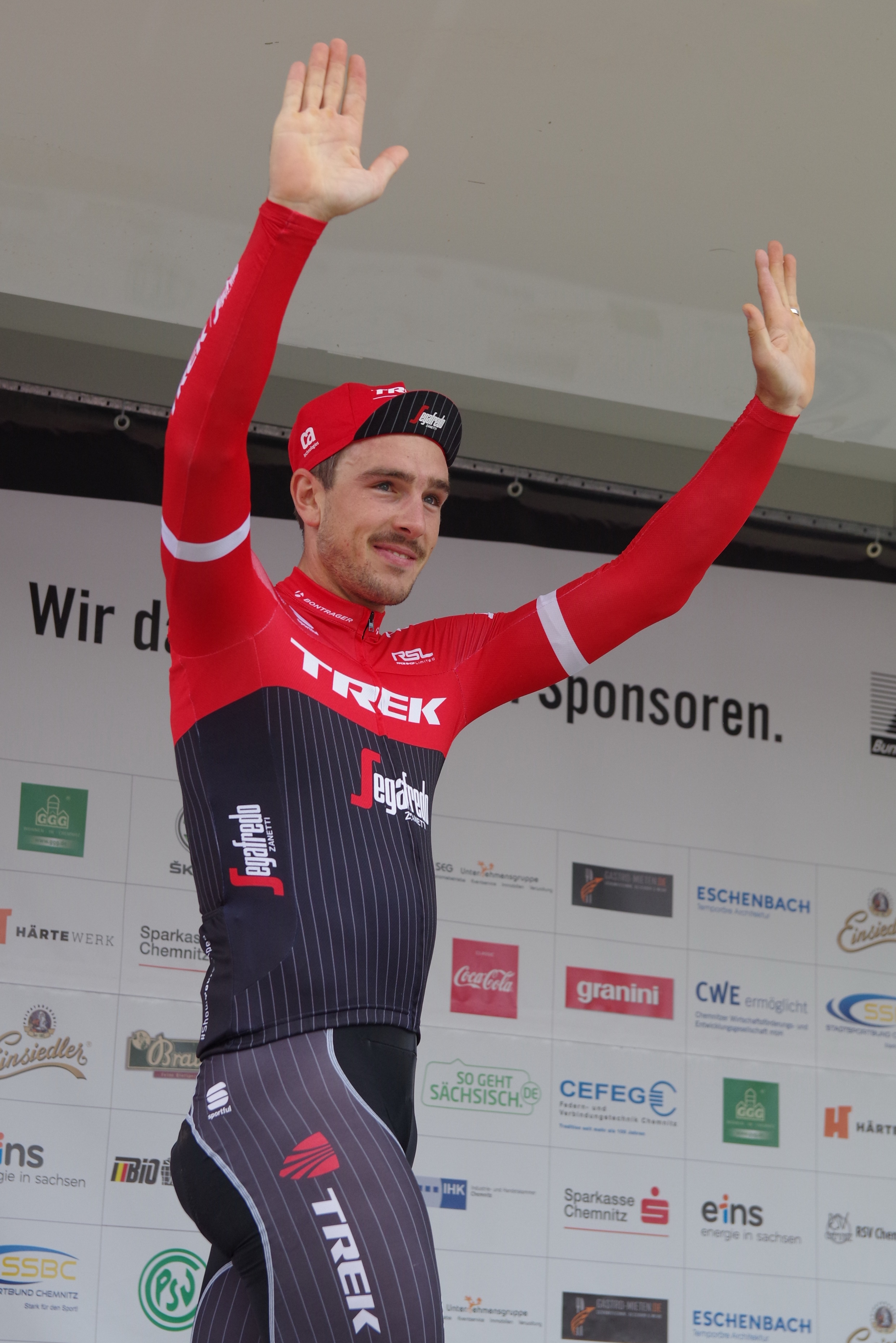
Degenkolb after finishing third at the German National Road Race Championships

Degenkolb took his first victory of the 2017 campaign on 2 February at the third stage of the Dubai Tour, edging out Reinardt Janse van Rensburg and Sonny Colbrelli in a bunch sprint. He finished the event in third position overall. During the spring classics season, Degenkolb took over the leading role at Trek–Segafredo from Fabian Cancellara, who had retired at the end of 2016. He eventually had strong results, but failed to win a race. He was dropped during the climb of the Poggio at Milan–San Remo, finishing seventh on the line. At E3 Harelbeke, the team was not present in the breakaway group, hurting its chances for a high finish, with Degenkolb finishing in 13th place. After finishing fifth at Gent–Wevelgem and seventh at the Tour of Flanders, Degenkolb entered Paris–Roubaix. Trek–Segafredo had a strong race, placing three riders in the top ten, with Degenkolb eventually in tenth position. However, Tom Boonen heavily criticised him after the race for shadowing him, saying: "To me, he rode the most cowardly race of his life." Degenkolb finished third at his home race, Eschborn–Frankfurt – Rund um den Finanzplatz at the beginning of May, having been delayed by a mechanical problem for leadout man Jasper Stuyven during the final sprint.

At the Tour de Suisse, Degenkolb was supported for sprint victories by his team, coming third in stage 3. He voiced his frustration after stage 5, when Trek–Segafredo paced him towards the finish, only for Degenkolb to be forced to brake hard behind Matteo Trentin, eventually finishing only in 12th position. He was included in the lineup for the Tour de France, enjoying a number of high sprint finishes, including a second place behind Marcel Kittel on stage 10.

Later in the season, Degenkolb started the Vuelta a España, but dropped out due to illness in the opening days. He was scheduled to lead the German squad for the road race at the UCI Road World Championships in Bergen, but pulled out of the competition one week beforehand, citing his ongoing health issues.

==== 2018 ====
Degenkolb returned to racing in late January 2018 at the Challenge Mallorca, where he won two of the four races in bunch sprints, sitting out the other two. He then competed at Paris–Nice, but withdrew with bronchitis, which also forced him to sit out Milan–San Remo. Degenkolb endured a difficult spring campaign without any major results. A crash at Paris–Roubaix forced him to be off the bike for three weeks. He returned to racing in June with the Hammer Series and then the Tour de Suisse. In Switzerland, he was unable to make an impact in the first stages, while trying to find his form to make it into the squad for the Tour de France. At the German National Road Race Championships on 1 July, Degenkolb finished second behind Pascal Ackermann.

At the Tour de France, Degenkolb had a strong opening few days, including finishing third on stage 8 to Amiens. The following day, stage 9 included several cobbled sections on the road to Roubaix, site of Degenkolb's 2015 Paris–Roubaix victory. 17 km (11 mi) from the finish, he followed an attack by Yves Lampaert and Greg Van Avermaet over the Camphin-en-Pévèle cobbled sector. The trio stayed clear until the end of the stage and Degenkolb outsprinted yellow-jersey wearer Van Avermaet to take his first Tour de France stage win, and his first UCI World Tour success after his accident in early 2016. A visibly emotional Degenkolb dedicated the victory to a late family friend, who he described as his "second father" and who had died the previous winter.

Later in the season, Degenkolb secured second-place finishes at both the Kampioenschap van Vlaanderen and the Münsterland Giro. On 20 October, he won the criterium race of the Japan Cup, beating out Cameron Scott in a sprint finish.

==== 2019 ====
Degenkolb took his first victory of 2019 on 17 February, winning stage 4 of the Tour de la Provence. He placed second at Gent–Wevelgem on 31 March, behind Alexander Kristoff. Degenkolb was left out of his team's squad for the Tour de France, but performed well enough at the Tour de Pologne to earn a place at the Vuelta a España.

=== Lotto–Soudal (2020–2021) ===
On 22 August 2019, Lotto–Soudal announced that they had signed Degenkolb on a two-year contract, beginning in 2020. Degenkolb was named in the startlist for the 2020 Tour de France; he finished outside the time limit on the opening stage – failing to reach Paris for the first time – after crashing heavily on a wet descent. On 17 September 2020, he won stage 3 of the Tour de Luxembourg.

=== Team DSM (2022–present) ===
In August 2021, Degenkolb signed a three-year contract with Team DSM, from the 2022 season. In his first season back with the team, Degenkolb's best result was a fourth-place finish at the Omloop van het Houtland. In early 2023, Degenkolb was part of an elite leading group in the closing kilometres of Paris–Roubaix. On the Carrefour de l'Arbre cobbled sector, he collided with eventual winner Mathieu van der Poel and fell, bruising his left shoulder. He continued on to the finish, coming in seventh, albeit 2 minutes, 35 seconds down on Van der Poel. Later in the season, he finished eighth in the road race at the UEC European Road Championships.

In January 2024, Degenkolb signed a one-year contract extension with the newly renamed Team dsm–firmenich PostNL, until the end of the 2025 season.

== Private life and family ==
Degenkolb is married and has two children with his wife Laura. The family lives in Oberursel, a small city close to Frankfurt. Degenkolb is a trained policeman.

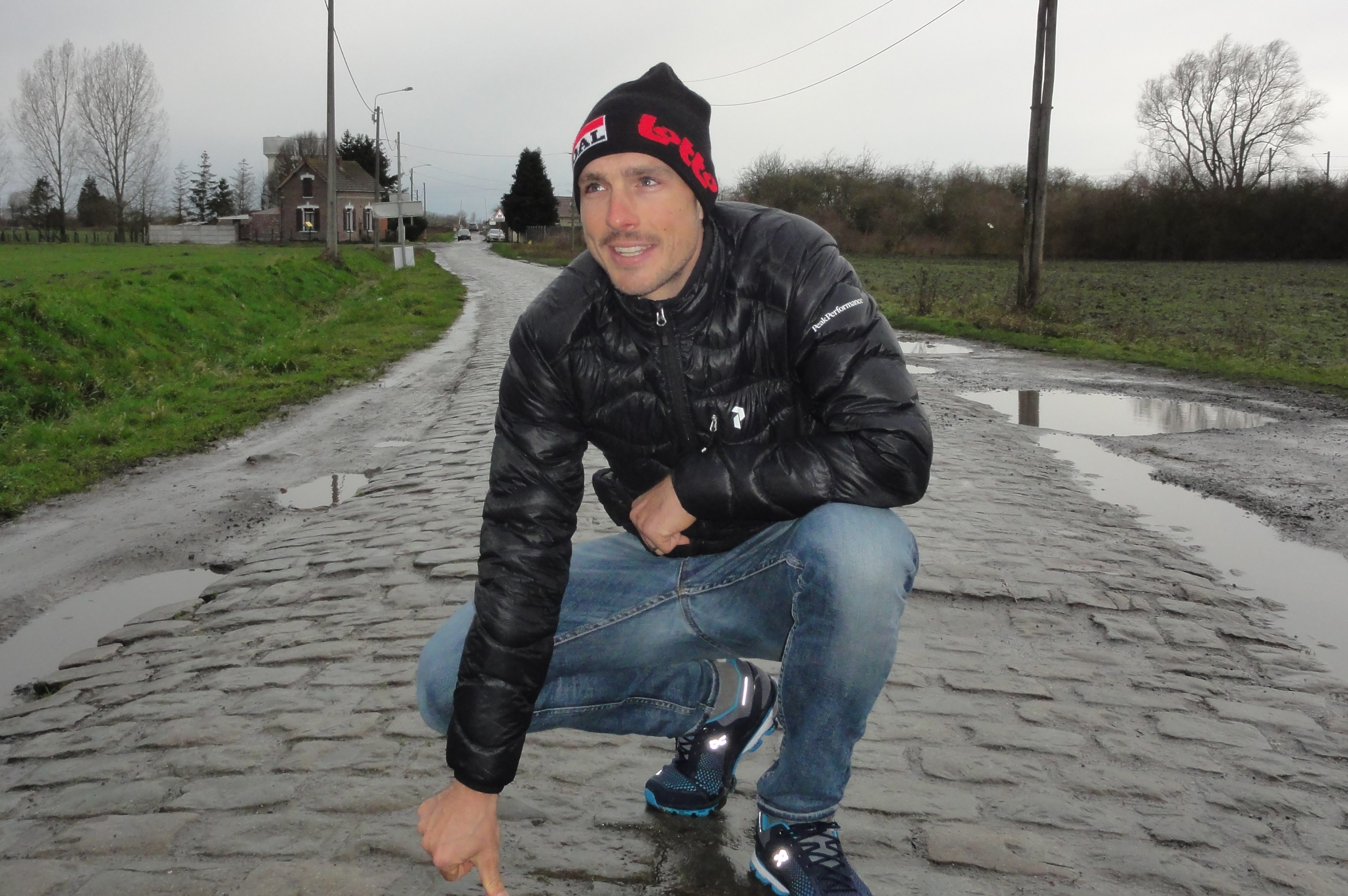
Degenkolb at the sector of Paris–Roubaix named in his honour in 2020

In October 2018, he became the first official ambassador for "Les Amis de Paris–Roubaix", a volunteer group which acts to preserve the course and nature of the Paris–Roubaix classic race, which Degenkolb won in 2015. In early 2019, Degenkolb launched a fundraising campaign to save the existence of the Paris–Roubaix Juniors race, the edition of Paris–Roubaix for riders under 19 years of age. In less than 24 hours, €11,500 were collected, ensuring the continuation of the event. For this effort, the organisers of Paris–Roubaix decided to honour Degenkolb the following year. The pavé sector at d'Hornaing à Wandignies-Hamage, the longest cobbled sector of the race, carried his name from 2020 onwards, and he became the first non-French rider to have a sector named in his honour.

== Major results ==
2006
1st Stage 2b (ITT) Giro della Lunigiana
3rd Time trial, National Junior Road Championships
2007
1st Time trial, National Junior Road Championships
UCI Junior World Championships

2nd Time trial
5th Road race

4th Overall Trofeo Karlsberg

1st Stage 2

2008
1st Stage 2 Thüringen Rundfahrt der U23
2nd Overall Tour du Haut-Anjou
2nd ZLM Tour
3rd Road race, UCI Under-23 Road World Championships
2009
National Under-23 Road Championships

2nd Road race
2nd Time trial

3rd ZLM Tour
3rd Ronde van Vlaanderen U23
6th Overall Le Triptyque des Monts et Châteaux
8th Overall Thüringen Rundfahrt der U23
2010
1st Road race, National Under-23 Road Championships
1st Overall Thüringen Rundfahrt der U23

1st Stage 3

Tour de Bretagne

1st Stages 4 & 5

Tour de l'Avenir

1st Stages 1 & 5

1st Stage 3 Tour Alsace
2nd Road race, UCI Under-23 Road World Championships
2nd La Côte Picarde
4th Overall Le Triptyque des Monts et Châteaux
6th Ronde van Vlaanderen Beloften
9th Overall FBD Insurance Rás

1st Stages 6 & 8

2011 (6 pro wins)
1st Eschborn–Frankfurt – Rund um den Finanzplatz
Critérium du Dauphiné

1st Stages 2 & 4

1st Stage 2 Volta ao Algarve
1st Stage 1 Driedaagse van West-Vlaanderen
1st Stage 2 Bayern Rundfahrt
2nd Trofeo Cala Millor
2nd Münsterland Giro
3rd Road race, National Road Championships
4th Paris–Bourges
10th Trofeo Magaluf–Palmanova
2012 (12)
1st Overall UCI Europe Tour
1st Overall Tour de Picardie

1st Points classification
1st Stages 1 & 3

1st Grand Prix d'Isbergues
Vuelta a España

1st Stages 2, 5, 7, 10 & 21

1st Stage 7 Tour de Pologne
3rd Overall Four Days of Dunkirk

1st Points classification
1st Young rider classification
1st Stages 1 & 2

3rd Binche–Tournai–Binche
3rd Paris–Bourges
4th Road race, UCI Road World Championships
4th Paris–Tours
5th Milan–San Remo
6th E3 Harelbeke
7th Eschborn–Frankfurt – Rund um den Finanzplatz
2013 (6)
1st Vattenfall Cyclassics
1st Paris–Bourges
1st Paris–Tours
1st Stage 5 Giro d'Italia
2nd Overall Tour de l'Eurométropole

1st Stages 2 & 4

2nd Brussels Cycling Classic
2nd Grand Prix d'Isbergues
3rd Road race, National Road Championships
4th Eschborn–Frankfurt – Rund um den Finanzplatz
9th Tour of Flanders
10th GP Ouest-France
2014 (10)
1st Gent–Wevelgem
1st Paris–Bourges
Vuelta a España

1st Points classification
1st Stages 4, 5, 12 & 17

Tour Méditerranéen

1st Points classification
1st Stages 1, 2 & 3

Paris–Nice

1st Points classification
1st Stage 3

2nd Road race, National Road Championships
2nd Paris–Roubaix
2nd Eschborn–Frankfurt – Rund um den Finanzplatz
2nd Münsterland Giro
2nd Binche–Chimay–Binche
3rd Overall Étoile de Bessèges

1st Points classification

4th Grand Prix d'Ouverture La Marseillaise
9th Road race, UCI Road World Championships
2015 (7)
1st Milan–San Remo
1st Paris–Roubaix
1st Gouden Pijl
1st Stage 21 Vuelta a España
Bayern Rundfahrt

1st Points classification
1st Stages 2 & 5

2nd Overall Dubai Tour

1st Stage 3

2nd Sparkassen Giro Bochum
7th Tour of Flanders
2016 (2)
1st Münsterland Giro
Arctic Race of Norway

1st Points classification
1st Stage 4

2nd EuroEyes Cyclassics
5th Bretagne Classic
2017 (1)
2nd Grand Prix of Aargau Canton
3rd Road race, National Road Championships
3rd Overall Dubai Tour

1st Stage 3

3rd Eschborn–Frankfurt – Rund um den Finanzplatz
5th Gent–Wevelgem
7th Milan–San Remo
7th Tour of Flanders
10th Paris–Roubaix
10th Grand Prix de Fourmies
2018 (3)
1st Trofeo Campos, Porreres, Felanitx, Ses Salines
1st Trofeo Palma
1st Stage 9 Tour de France
2nd Road race, National Road Championships
2nd Münsterland Giro
2nd Kampioenschap van Vlaanderen
4th EuroEyes Cyclassics
2019 (1)
1st Stage 4 Tour de la Provence
2nd Gent–Wevelgem
2nd Eschborn–Frankfurt
2nd Grand Prix d'Isbergues
8th Trofeo Palma
2020 (1)
1st Stage 3 Tour de Luxembourg
4th Three Days of Bruges–De Panne
6th Gent–Wevelgem
9th Tour of Flanders
10th Overall BinckBank Tour
2021
2nd Eschborn–Frankfurt
3rd Ronde van Limburg
6th Tro-Bro Léon
6th Grand Prix de Fourmies
7th Le Samyn
2022
4th Omloop van het Houtland
2023
7th Paris–Roubaix
8th Road race, UEC European Road Championships

=== Grand Tour general classification results timeline ===
Grand Tour	2011	2012	2013	2014	2015	2016	2017	2018	2019	2020	2021	2022	2023	2024	2025
Giro d'Italia	—	—	DNF	—	—	—	—	—	—	—	—	—	—	—	—
Tour de France	—	—	121	123	109	148	121	111	—	DNF	—	105	145	122	—
Vuelta a España	144	131	—	116	90	—	DNF	—	124	—	—	124	—	—	—

=== Classics results timeline ===
Monument	2011	2012	2013	2014	2015	2016	2017	2018	2019	2020	2021	2022	2023	2024	2025
Milan–San Remo	—	5	18	39	1	—	7	—	84	—	32	—	39	—	64
Tour of Flanders	94	59	9	15	7	—	7	32	29	9	30	18	19	37	DNF
Paris–Roubaix	19	63	28	2	1	—	10	17	28	NH	53	18	7	11	—
Liège–Bastogne–Liège	Has not contested during his career														
Giro di Lombardia	Has not contested during his career														
Classic	2011	2012	2013	2014	2015	2016	2017	2018	2019	2020	2021	2022	2023	2024	2025
Omloop Het Nieuwsblad	12	11	72	—	—	—	—	—	—	—	—	43	32	—	104
E3 Harelbeke	—	6	65	15	25	—	13	21	22	NH	29	32	34	—	—
Gent–Wevelgem	—	57	65	1	DNF	—	5	48	2	6	27	27	12	97	11
Eschborn–Frankfurt	1	7	4	2	—	DNF	3	—	2	NH	2	—	18	76	—
Hamburg Cyclassics	—	—	1	—	—	2	—	4	—	Not held		—	—	—	—
Bretagne Classic	—	—	10	—	—	5	—	13	—	—	—	—	14	103	
Paris–Tours	11	4	1	43	—	—	—	—	—	—	—	28	11	—	

Legend
—	Did not compete
DNF	Did not finish
NH	Not held
