= 2014 Gent–Wevelgem =

2014 UCI World Tour, race 7 of 28
- Event poster with previous winner Peter Sagan

Race details
- Dates: 30 March 2014
- Stages: 1
- Distance: 233 km (145 mi)
- Winning time: 5h 34' 43"

Results
	Winner	John Degenkolb (GER)	(Giant–Shimano)
	Second	Arnaud Démare (FRA)	(FDJ.fr)
	Third	Peter Sagan (SVK)	(Cannondale)

The 2014 Gent–Wevelgem was the 76th running of the Gent–Wevelgem single-day Belgian cycling race. It was held on 30 March 2014, over a distance of 233 kilometres (144.8 miles) between Deinze and Wevelgem and was the seventh race of the 2014 UCI World Tour season. It was won by John Degenkolb of the Giant–Shimano team, in the sprint ahead of Arnaud Démare and Peter Sagan.

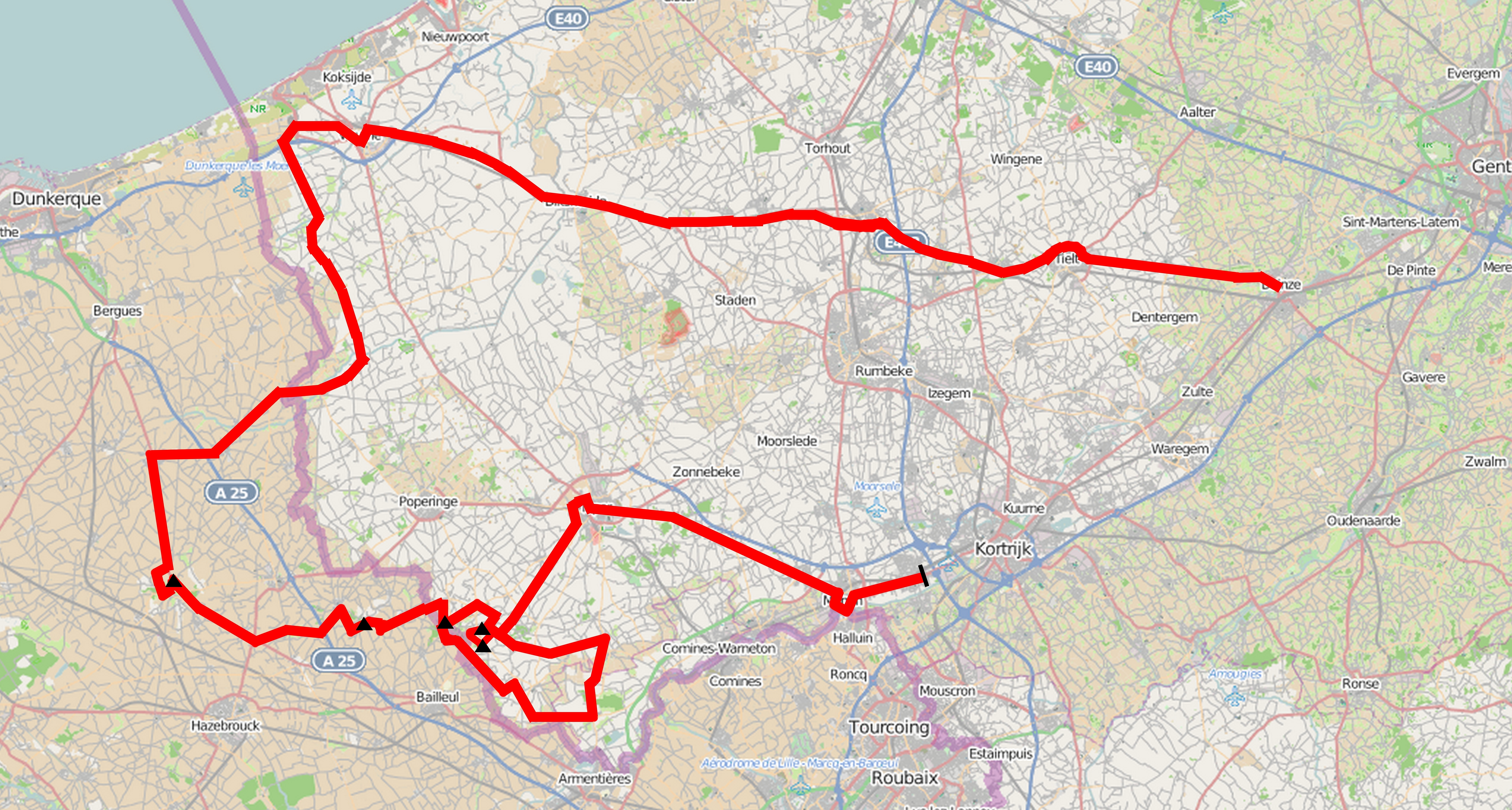
Gent-Wevelgem 2014

== Teams ==
As Gent–Wevelgem was a UCI World Tour event, all 18 UCI ProTeams were invited automatically and obligated to send a squad. Seven other squads were given wildcard places, thus completing the 25-team peloton.

The 25 teams that competed in the race were:

- Ag2r–La Mondiale
- Androni Giocattoli–Venezuela
- Astana
- Belkin Pro Cycling
- BMC Racing Team
- Cannondale
- Cofidis
- Team Europcar
- FDJ.fr
- Garmin–Sharp
- Giant–Shimano
- IAM Cycling
- Team Katusha
- Lampre–Merida
- Lotto–Belisol
- Movistar Team
- MTN–Qhubeka
- NetApp–Endura
- Omega Pharma–Quick-Step
- Orica–GreenEDGE
- Team Sky
- Tinkoff–Saxo
- Topsport Vlaanderen–Baloise
- Trek Factory Racing
- Wanty–Groupe Gobert

== Results ==
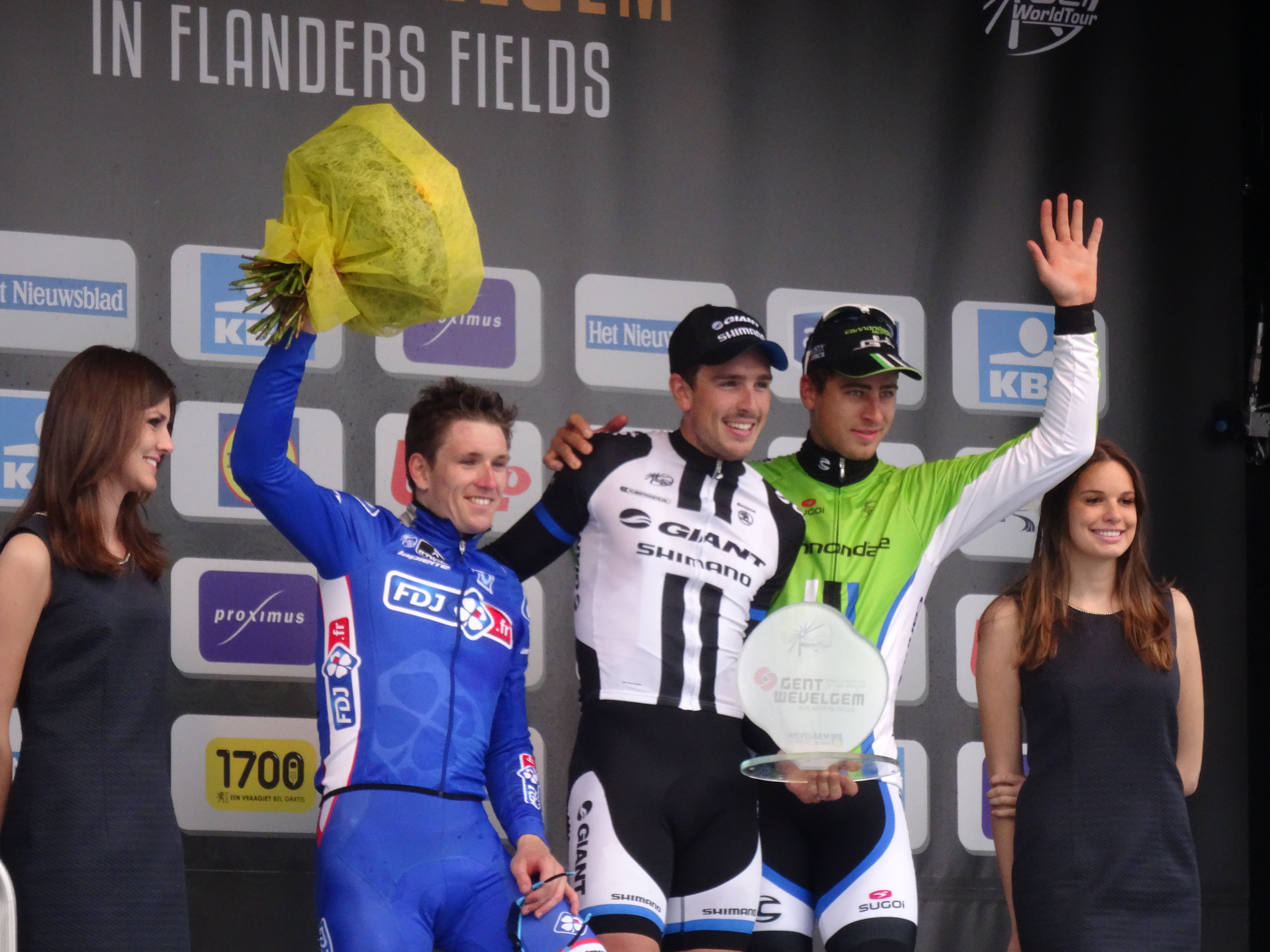
The podium (from left to right): Arnaud Démare, John Degenkolb and Peter Sagan.

	Cyclist	Team	Time
1	John Degenkolb (GER)	Giant–Shimano	5h 34' 43"
2	Arnaud Démare (FRA)	FDJ.fr	s.t.
3	Peter Sagan (SVK)	Cannondale	s.t.
4	Sep Vanmarcke (BEL)	Belkin Pro Cycling	s.t.
5	Tom Boonen (BEL)	Omega Pharma–Quick-Step	s.t.
6	Tom Van Asbroeck (BEL)	Topsport Vlaanderen–Baloise	s.t.
7	Alexey Tsatevich (RUS)	Team Katusha	s.t.
8	Yauheni Hutarovich (BLR)	Ag2r–La Mondiale	s.t.
9	Thor Hushovd (NOR)	BMC Racing Team	s.t.
10	Jürgen Roelandts (BEL)	Lotto–Belisol	s.t.
