= 2015 Milan–San Remo =

Cycling race

2015 UCI World Tour, race 4 of 28
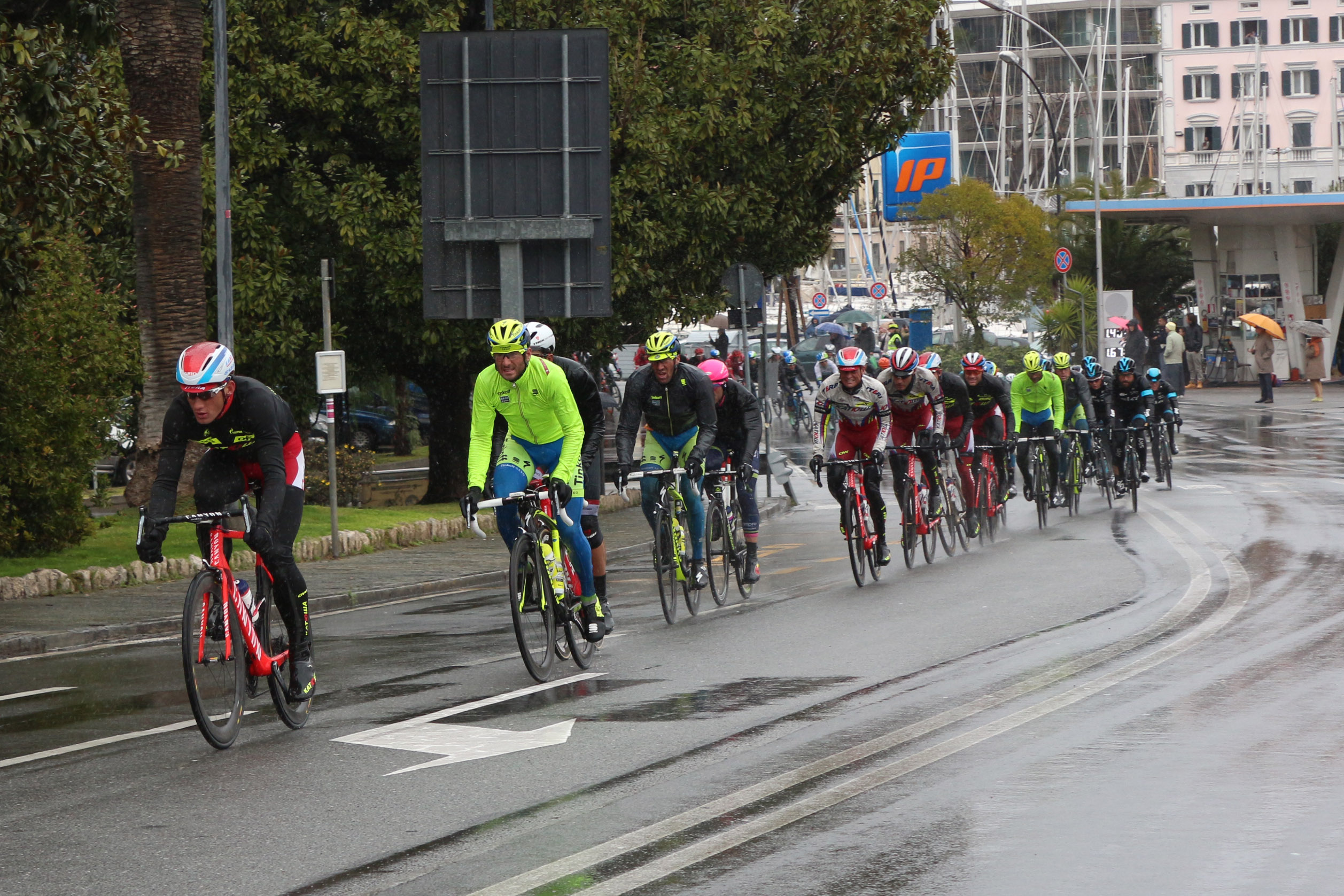
- The peloton in Savona

Race details
- Dates: 22 March 2015
- Stages: 1
- Distance: 293 km (182 mi)
- Winning time: 6h 46' 16"

Results
| | Winner | John Degenkolb (GER) | (Team Giant–Alpecin) |
| | Second | Alexander Kristoff (NOR) | (Team Katusha) |
| | Third | Michael Matthews (AUS) | (Orica–GreenEDGE) |

The 2015 Milan–San Remo was a one-day cycling classic that took place in Italy on 22 March. The race was the 106th edition of the Milan–San Remo. It was the fourth of the 28 races on the Union Cycliste Internationale's (UCI) 2015 World Tour and the first of them to be a one-day race. It was also the first of the 2015 cycling monuments, the five most important one-day races of the year. The defending champion was Alexander Kristoff (Team Katusha), who won the previous year's race in a sprint.

The 2015 race returned to the traditional route of Milan−San Remo, which had not been used since an extra climb had been added in the 2008 race. The removal of the La Manie climb was seen as making the race more suitable for sprinters. The race started in the city of Milan, travelling to the Mediterranean and then south along the coast. The final part of the race was the most difficult, with five climbs in the last 55 kilometres (34 mi), before the race ended in the city of Sanremo, for a distance of 293 kilometres (182.1 miles).

After numerous attacks in the final stages of the race, particularly from riders on the BMC Racing Team and Team Sky, it was decided in a sprint in San Remo on the Via Roma, won by John Degenkolb (Team Giant–Alpecin), with Kristoff second and Michael Matthews (Orica–GreenEDGE) in third place.

== Route ==
=== Route history and course changes ===
The route of Milan–San Remo has varied over the years, with climbs added at various points to make the course harder. The first climb to be introduced was the Poggio, followed by the Cipressa in 1982. The course was made more difficult again in 2008, with the addition of the climb of La Manie approximately 90 kilometres (56 miles) from the end of the race. The finish of the course was also moved in 2008 from the traditional location on the Via Roma to Lungomare Italo Calvino. Further changes were planned for the 2014 edition. The climb of La Manie was removed, and a new climb, the Pompeiana, was planned between the Cipressa and the Poggio, but was discarded after landslides made it unsafe to ride.

The 2015 edition of the race was similar to the route ultimately taken by the 2014 edition: neither La Manie nor the Pompeiana were included. The course closely resembled the route that had been used between 1982 and 2007, with the traditional finish on the Via Roma. The race director, Mauro Vegni, announced that the race would use this route again in future editions, without any extra climbs. He expressed hope that the race would remain "finely balanced" between sprinters and attackers.

=== 2015 route ===
Altitude profile of the 2015 Milan–San Remo

The longest one-day race on the professional cycling calendar, the 2015 edition was 293 kilometres (182 miles) in length. It began in the city of Milan, on the Via della Chiesa Rossa. From Milan, the first part of the route was almost entirely flat, as the course passed through the provinces of Milan, Pavia and Alessandria. There were no significant climbs in the first 100 kilometres (62 miles). As they entered the province of Genoa, the riders climbed the Passo del Turchino, a long and gentle climb with no significant difficulty. The descent, however, was twisting, giving an advantage to the riders who were towards the front of the peloton. The next 80 kilometres (50 miles) were again generally flat. This part of the course, in the province of Savona, took the riders along the Mediterranean coast.

After around 240 kilometres (150 miles), the route entered the province of Imperia, and the riders faced a series of climbs known as the Capi: the Capo Mele after 241.7 kilometres (150.2 miles); the Capo Cerva after 246.4 kilometres (153.1 miles); and the Capo Berta after 254.3 kilometres (158.0 miles). With less than 40 kilometres (25 miles) left in the race, a short flat section followed before the riders entered the climb of the Cipressa, where there was always a battle between the teams to position their riders. The Cipressa was 5.6-kilometre (3.5-mile) long, with an average gradient of 4.1%, and its summit came with 21.5 kilometres (13.4 miles) to the finish line.

After the descent from the Cipressa, a flat, 9-kilometre (5.6-mile) section of road followed, often with a headwind. The final climb of the race was the Poggio, which was 3.7 kilometres (2.3 miles) long, with an average gradient of 7% and a maximum of 8%; the summit came with 5.5 kilometres (3.4 miles) left in the race. The descent from the climb used narrow roads and hairpin bends; it required strong bike-handling skills. At the foot of the descent, there were 2.3 kilometres (1.4 miles) left, on major urban roads. The final turn came with 750 metres (2,460 ft) remaining.

== Teams ==
Milan–San Remo is part of the UCI World Tour; all of the 17 UCI WorldTeams were obliged to take part. The race organisers, RCS Sport, also made eight wildcard invitations to UCI Professional Continental teams, for a total of 25 teams.

UCI WorldTeams

- AG2R La Mondiale
- Astana
- BMC Racing Team
- Etixx–Quick-Step
- FDJ
- IAM Cycling
- Lampre–Merida
- Lotto–Soudal
- Movistar Team
- Orica–GreenEDGE
- Cannondale–Garmin
- Team Giant–Alpecin
- Team Katusha
- LottoNL–Jumbo
- Team Sky
- Tinkoff–Saxo
- Trek Factory Racing

UCI Professional Continental teams

- Bardiani–CSF
- Bora–Argon 18
- CCC–Sprandi–Polkowice
- Cofidis
- Colombia
- MTN–Qhubeka
- Team Novo Nordisk
- Androni Giocattoli

== Pre-race favourites ==
As Milan–San Remo is generally flat and the climbs at the end are not particularly hard, it is often seen as a race for sprinters and is sometimes known as the "sprinters' classic". The defending champion, Alexander Kristoff (Team Katusha), was foremost among these, as he had a particular aptitude for long races in cold conditions. Mark Cavendish (Etixx–Quick-Step), who won the race in 2009, was seen as the most likely challenger to Kristoff in a bunch sprint. Cavendish, however, had suffered from a stomach virus in the weeks before the race and was not in perfect condition. Other sprinters expected to have a chance at victory included John Degenkolb (Team Giant–Alpecin), Michael Matthews (Orica–GreenEDGE), André Greipel (Lotto–Soudal), Arnaud Démare (FDJ), Ben Swift (Team Sky) and Peter Sagan (Tinkoff–Saxo).

The other likely scenario was that a small group of riders would break away over the final climbs, most probably on the Poggio, and be able to hold off the chase from the group behind. Fabian Cancellara (Trek Factory Racing), who won the race in 2008 and had finished on the podium for the last four years, was considered the most likely rider to win the race in this scenario. Sagan was also believed to have a good chance of victory, since he was thought to have the ability and form to win the race from a breakaway as well as a bunch sprint. Other riders who could win the race from a breakaway included Greg Van Avermaet (BMC Racing Team) and Sep Vanmarcke (LottoNL–Jumbo). Although Cavendish was not in perfect form, his Etixx–Quick-Step had other riders capable of victory: Zdeněk Štybar and Michał Kwiatkowski, the 2014 world champion, had the potential to attempt an attack in the final part of the race.

== Report ==
=== Early stages ===
The race began in wet and cold conditions in Milan. Four riders formed a breakaway shortly after the beginning of the race: Jan Bárta (Bora–Argon 18), Juan Sebastián Molano (Colombia), Andrea Peron (Team Novo Nordisk) and Maarten Tjallingii (LottoNL–Jumbo). They were joined shortly afterwards by Marco Frapporti, Tiziano Dall'Antonia (both Androni Giocattoli), Matteo Bono (Lampre–Merida), Serge Pauwels (MTN–Qhubeka), Adrian Kurek (CCC–Sprandi–Polkowice), Stefano Pirazzi (Bardiani–CSF) and Julien Bérard (AG2R La Mondiale). After 30 kilometres (19 miles), they had a lead of over 10 minutes. Trek Factory Racing and Team Katusha were among the teams leading the peloton; their efforts reduced the gap to seven minutes after 100 kilometres (62 miles). As the breakaway passed over the Passo del Turchino, about halfway through the race, they had a lead of five minutes. The gap was briefly as low as four minutes, but was generally held at about five minutes until there were about 85 kilometres (53 miles) left to race. As the riders arrived on the Mediterranean coast, the weather conditions improved, with the rain stopping and the roads drying out.

=== Tre Capi and the Cipressa ===
With 50 kilometres (31 miles) remaining, as the riders climbed the Capi climbs, the breakaway's lead was reduced to three minutes; this was reduced again to 90 seconds over the next 10 kilometres (6.2 miles). The leading group was breaking up during these climbs, leaving Pirazzi and Bono at the front of the race. Team Sky were the main team controlling the peloton at this point, especially as the climb crossed the Capo Berta. Luke Rowe was leading the group, with Geraint Thomas, Ben Swift and Salvatore Puccio immediately behind. On the descent from the Capo Berta, Puccio crashed and brought down several riders behind him, including Zdeněk Štybar (Etixx–Quick-Step) and Christopher Juul-Jensen (Tinkoff–Saxo), whose crash resulted in a bloodied face.

Following Puccio's crash, Rowe, Thomas and Swift had a gap ahead of the peloton. Rowe continued to drive the three-man group of Team Sky riders and they caught the remainder of the original breakaway, with Bono the last to be caught. Several riders bridged across to the Sky group, including Štybar and Greg Van Avermaet (BMC Racing Team), while Orica–GreenEDGE kept up a fast pace in the peloton. As the riders reached the foot of the Cipressa climb, the groups came back together. At this point, Arnaud Démare (FDJ) crashed. On the climb, Team Sky's Lars Petter Nordhaug and Trek Factory Racing's Julián Arredondo set the pace and caused difficulty for several of the sprinters, including Alexander Kristoff (Team Katusha), Mark Cavendish (Etixx–Quick-Step) and Nacer Bouhanni (Cofidis). Cavendish had a mechanical problem during the climb – the same slipped-chain problem that he had suffered in stage 2 of Tirreno–Adriatico. He had to put in significant effort to stay with the group on the Cipressa, which meant that he was unable to contest the later stages of the race.

On the descent from the Cipressa, Filippo Pozzato (Lampre–Merida) put in a brief, unsuccessful attack. Soon afterwards Daniel Oss (BMC Racing Team) attacked and was followed by Thomas. Oss and Thomas built a lead ahead of the main group. With 15 kilometres (9.3 miles) to the finish line, they were 30 seconds ahead. After some hesitation, the lead was cut down by the pack behind, initially led by José Serpa (Lampre–Merida), then by riders from Trek Factory Racing and Astana. The pack was 17 seconds behind at the foot of the Poggio climb.

=== Poggio and San Remo ===
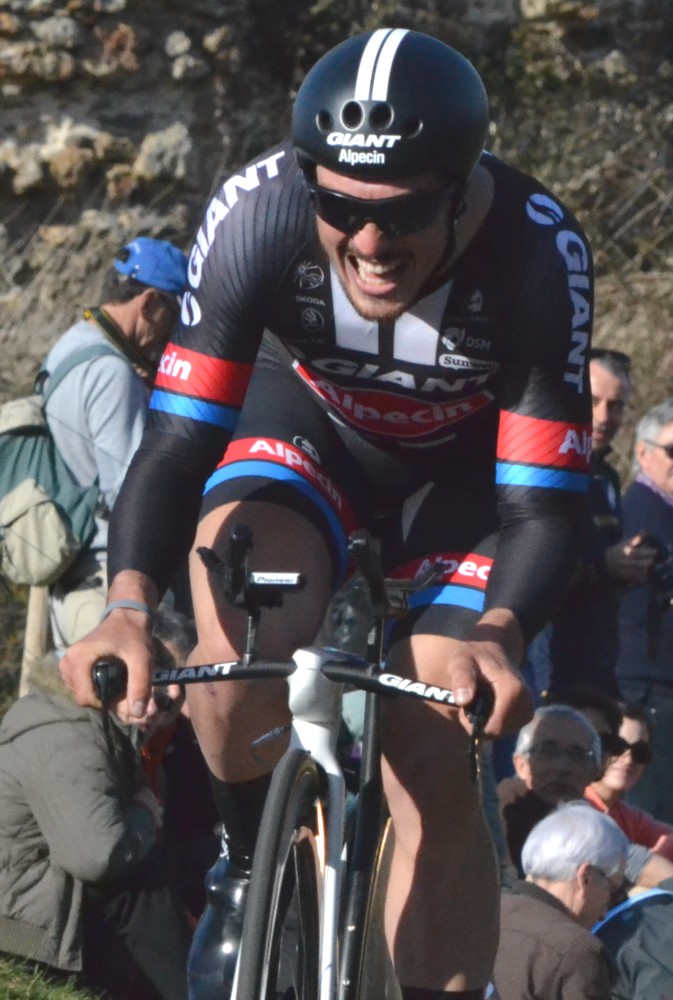
John Degenkolb (Team Giant–Alpecin) won the 2015 Milan–San Remo in the sprint (photographed here at the 2015 Paris–Nice).

On the Poggio, Thomas attacked alone; Luca Paolini (Team Katusha) was leading the peloton, although he was unable to reduce Thomas' lead. Eventually, attacks came from Philippe Gilbert (BMC Racing Team) and, more tellingly, his teammate Van Avermaet. Van Avermaet's attack was followed by Arredondo, Peter Sagan (Tinkoff–Saxo) and Michael Matthews (Orica–GreenEDGE). Van Avermaet and Thomas were together at the top of the climb, a few seconds ahead of the second group; the peloton were a further few seconds back. On the descent from the Poggio, Gilbert crashed, causing the crash of several other riders. These included Michał Kwiatkowski (Etixx–Quick-Step), Gerald Ciolek (MTN–Qhubeka) and Štybar. Kwiatkowski said after the race that his helmet had saved his life in the crash.

Van Avermaet and Thomas were caught soon after the summit of the Poggio, with one reduced group coming into the finish. Thomas continued at the front of the group, bringing back another attack from Van Avermaet and attempting to lead out Swift, but he was exhausted from his earlier efforts in several breakaways. As no rider was able to escape from the front group in the final part of the race, a group came together into the finishing straight. Paolini attempted to lead out Kristoff, as he had done a year earlier. Kristoff launched his sprint with 300 metres (980 ft) remaining, but was tired after a long day's racing and was unable to maintain his speed to the finishing line. John Degenkolb (Team Giant–Alpecin) came around him in the final 50 metres (160 ft) to take the race win, the first monument win of his career. Kristoff finished second, while Matthews beat Sagan to third place.

== Results ==
Result
| Rank | Rider | Team | Time |
|---|---|---|---|
| 1 | John Degenkolb (GER) | Team Giant–Alpecin | 6h 46' 16" |
| 2 | Alexander Kristoff (NOR) | Team Katusha | + 0" |
| 3 | Michael Matthews (AUS) | Orica–GreenEDGE | + 0" |
| 4 | Peter Sagan (SVK) | Tinkoff–Saxo | + 0" |
| 5 | Niccolò Bonifazio (ITA) | Lampre–Merida | + 0" |
| 6 | Nacer Bouhanni (FRA) | Cofidis | + 0" |
| 7 | Fabian Cancellara (SUI) | Trek Factory Racing | + 0" |
| 8 | Davide Cimolai (ITA) | Lampre–Merida | + 0" |
| 9 | Tony Gallopin (FRA) | Lotto–Soudal | + 0" |
| 10 | Edvald Boasson Hagen (NOR) | MTN–Qhubeka | + 0" |

== Post-race analysis ==
=== Reactions ===
After the race, Degenkolb contrasted his tears of frustration at his eighteenth place in the 2014 race to the tears of joy that followed his victory in 2015. He attributed his win in part to the fact that he was not seen as a favourite, and he gave credit to his teammates Bert De Backer and Tom Dumoulin for their assistance during the race. Degenkolb described it as "the best day in [his] cycling career", as it was his first victory in one of the cycling monuments (he won a second the following month at Paris–Roubaix).

Kristoff, meanwhile, expressed disappointment with his second-place finish and his failure to defend his 2014 title. He suggested that another rider in the final part of the race could have given a better result, as Paolini's tiredness after a long spell at the front of the race meant that Kristoff had to start his sprint too early. Michael Matthews' third-place finish was the most significant result of his career, but he too was disappointed at having fallen short, after feeling strong on the climb of the Poggio.

=== UCI World Tour rankings ===
Thanks to the 100 points won in the race, Degenkolb moved into fourth place in the UCI World Tour rankings. His total of 102 points left him 96 points behind the leader, Richie Porte (Team Sky). Matthews and Kristoff also moved into the top ten. Team Sky and Australia retained their leads in the teams and nations rankings.

UCI World Tour individual rankings
| Rank | Rider | Team | Points |
|---|---|---|---|
| 1 | Richie Porte (AUS) | Team Sky | 198 |
| 2 | Rohan Dennis (AUS) | BMC Racing Team | 114 |
| 3 | Nairo Quintana (COL) | Movistar Team | 106 |
| 4 | John Degenkolb (GER) | Team Giant–Alpecin | 106 |
| 5 | Michał Kwiatkowski (POL) | Etixx–Quick-Step | 89 |
| 6 | Alexander Kristoff (NOR) | Team Katusha | 87 |
| 7 | Bauke Mollema (NED) | Trek Factory Racing | 84 |
| 8 | Michael Matthews (AUS) | Orica–GreenEDGE | 79 |
| 9 | Simon Špilak (SLO) | Team Katusha | 78 |
| 10 | Cadel Evans (AUS) | BMC Racing Team | 76 |
