= 2012 Paris–Tours =

2012 UCI Europe Tour

Race details
- Dates: 7 October 2012
- Stages: 1
- Distance: 235 km (146.0 mi)
- Winning time: 4h 50' 34"

Results
| | Winner | Marco Marcato (ITA) | (Vacansoleil–DCM) |
| | Second | Laurens De Vreese (BEL) | (Topsport Vlaanderen–Mercator) |
| | Third | Niki Terpstra (NED) | (Omega Pharma–Quick-Step) |

The 2012 Paris–Tours was the 106th edition of this single day road bicycle racing event. Marco Marcato outsprinted Laurens De Vreese in the final meters to stay out of the grip of the chasing group and peloton. Marcato thereby won the biggest race of his career so far, after finishing second in 2011. He recorded the highest average speed ever in a race of over 200km in this race, and so was considered holder of the Ruban Jaune.

== General standings ==
| | Cyclist | Team | Time |
|---|---|---|---|
| 1 | Marco Marcato (ITA) | Vacansoleil–DCM | 4h 50' 34" |
| 2 | Laurens De Vreese (BEL) | Topsport Vlaanderen–Mercator | + 0" |
| 3 | Niki Terpstra (NED) | Omega Pharma–Quick-Step | + 0" |
| 4 | John Degenkolb (GER) | Argos–Shimano | + 6" |
| 5 | Laurent Pichon (FRA) | Bretagne–Schuller | + 12" |
| 6 | Greg Van Avermaet (BEL) | BMC Racing Team | + 12" |
| 7 | Björn Leukemans (BEL) | Vacansoleil–DCM | + 12" |
| 8 | Jonathan Hivert (FRA) | Saur–Sojasun | + 19" |
| 9 | Jens Keukeleire (BEL) | Orica–GreenEDGE | + 19" |
| 10 | Zdeněk Štybar (CZE) | Quick-Step | + 19" |
