= Tour de Picardie =

French multi-day road cycling race

Race details
- Date: Mid May
- Region: Picardy, France
- English name: Tour of Picardy
- Local name(s): Tour de Picardie (in French)
- Discipline: Road
- Competition: UCI Europe Tour
- Type: Stage race
- Organiser: Amaury Sport Organisation
- Web site: www.tourdepicardie.com

History
- First edition: 1936
- Editions: 70
- Final edition: 2016
- First winner: Marcel Blanchon (FRA)
- Most wins: 4 riders with 2 wins
- Final winner: Nacer Bouhanni (FRA)

The Tour de Picardie was a professional multi-stage cycle road race that was held between 1936 and 2016 in Picardy, France. In its last twelve editions, it was organised as a 2.1 event on the UCI Europe Tour.

The race was called Tour de l'Oise from its founding in 1936 until 1999, when it was renamed the Tour de Picardie et de l'Oise, and then the Tour de Picardie in 2000, which it remained until its demise. It is not to be confused with a different race, also called the Tour de Picardie (or Grand Prix du Courrier Picard), which was staged from 1946 to 1965.

== Winners ==
| Year | Country | Rider | Team |
|---|---|---|---|
| 1936 | France | Marcel Blanchon | Alcyon–Dunlop |
| 1937 | France | Gaston Grimbert | Armor-Dunlop |
| 1938 | France | Lucien Le Guével | individual |
| 1939 | France | André Desmoulins | Peugeot–Dunlop |
| 1940– 1949 | No race | | |
| 1950 | France | Simon Hyz | individual |
| 1951 | France | Pierre Lagrange | Alcyon–Dunlop |
| 1952 | France | Raymond Komor | individual |
| 1953 | France | Alfred Tonello | Alcyon–Dunlop |
| 1954 | France | Jean Bellay | Mercier–BP–Hutchinson |
| 1955 | Luxembourg | Lucien Gillen | Magnat–Debon |
| 1956 | France | Louis Caput | Saint-Raphaël–R. Geminiani–Dunlop |
| 1957 | France | Jean Stablinski | Essor–Leroux |
| 1958 | France | Joseph Thomin | Helyett–Leroux–Hutchinson |
| 1959 | France | Joseph Wasko | Mercier–BP–Hutchinson |
| 1960 | Netherlands | Jo de Haan | Saint-Raphaël–R. Geminiani–Dunlop |
| 1961 | Spain | Jaime Alomar | Peugeot–BP–Dunlop |
| 1962 | Belgium | André Bar | Peugeot–BP–Dunlop |
| 1963 | West Germany | Klaus Bugdahl | Torpedo |
| 1964 | West Germany | Winfried Bölke | Peugeot–BP–Englebert |
| 1965 | Ireland | Shay Elliott | Ford France–Gitane |
| 1966 | France | Hubert Niel | Peugeot–BP–Michelin |
| 1967 | West Germany | Peter Glemser | Torpedo-Continental |
| 1968 | Belgium | Walter Boucquet | Pull Over Centrale–Novy |
| 1969 | France | José Samyn | Bic |
| 1970 | Belgium | Frans Verbeeck | Geens–Watney |
| 1971 | Belgium | André Dierickx | Watney–Avia |
| 1972 | France | Cyrille Guimard | Gan–Mercier–Hutchinson |
| 1973 | France | Alain Santy | Bic |
| 1974 | France | Robert Mintkiewicz | Sonolor–Gitane |
| 1975 | West Germany | Dietrich Thurau | TI–Raleigh |
| 1976 | Belgium | Emiel Gijsemans | IJsboerke–Colnago |
| 1977 | Belgium | Willy Teirlinck | Gitane–Campagnolo |
| 1978 | Belgium | Willy Teirlinck | Renault–Gitane–Campagnolo |
| 1979 | France | Bernard Hinault | Renault–Gitane |
| 1980 | France | Patrick Bonnet | Renault–Gitane |
| 1981 | Belgium | Jean-Luc Vandenbroucke | La Redoute–Motobécane |
| 1982 | France | Gilbert Duclos-Lassalle | Peugeot–Shell–Michelin |
| 1983 | France | Pascal Jules | Renault–Elf |
| 1984 | Australia | Allan Peiper | Peugeot–Shell–Michelin |
| 1985 | Belgium | Jozef Lieckens | Lotto |
| 1986 | France | Gilbert Duclos-Lassalle | Peugeot–Shell |
| 1987 | Netherlands | Jelle Nijdam | Superconfex–Kwantum–Yoko–Colnago |
| 1988 | Canada | Steve Bauer | Weinmann–La Suisse–SMM Uster |
| 1989 | West Germany | Andreas Kappes | Toshiba |
| 1990 | Belgium | Hendrik Redant | Lotto–Superclub |
| 1991 | Belgium | Wilfried Nelissen | Weinmann–Eddy Merckx |
| 1992 | France | Thierry Marie | Castorama |
| 1993 | France | Frédéric Moncassin | WordPerfect–Colnago–Decca |
| 1994 | Spain | Miguel Induráin | Banesto |
| 1995 | Netherlands | Jelle Nijdam | TVM–Polis Direct |
| 1996 | France | Philippe Gaumont | GAN |
| 1997 | No race | | |
| 1998 | Kazakhstan | Alexander Vinokourov | Casino–Ag2r |
| 1999 | Estonia | Jaan Kirsipuu | Casino–Ag2r Prévoyance |
| 2000 | Denmark | Michael Sandstød | Memory Card–Jack & Jones |
| 2001 | France | Olivier Asmaker | CSC–Tiscali |
| 2002 | Denmark | Michael Sandstød | CSC–Tiscali |
| 2003 | Great Britain | David Millar | Cofidis |
| 2004 | Belgium | Tom Boonen | Quick-Step–Davitamon |
| 2005 | Estonia | Janek Tombak | Cofidis |
| 2006 | France | Jimmy Casper | Cofidis |
| 2007 | South Africa | Robbie Hunter | Barloworld |
| 2008 | France | Sébastien Chavanel | Française des Jeux |
| 2009 | Netherlands | Lieuwe Westra | Vacansoleil |
| 2010 | Great Britain | Ben Swift | Team Sky |
| 2011 | France | Romain Feillu | Vacansoleil–DCM |
| 2012 | Germany | John Degenkolb | Argos–Shimano |
| 2013 | Germany | Marcel Kittel | Argos–Shimano |
| 2014 | France | Arnaud Démare | FDJ.fr |
| 2015 | Belgium | Kris Boeckmans | Lotto–Soudal |
| 2016 | France | Nacer Bouhanni | Cofidis |
