= 2013 FDJ.fr season =

FDJ.fr
- 2013 season
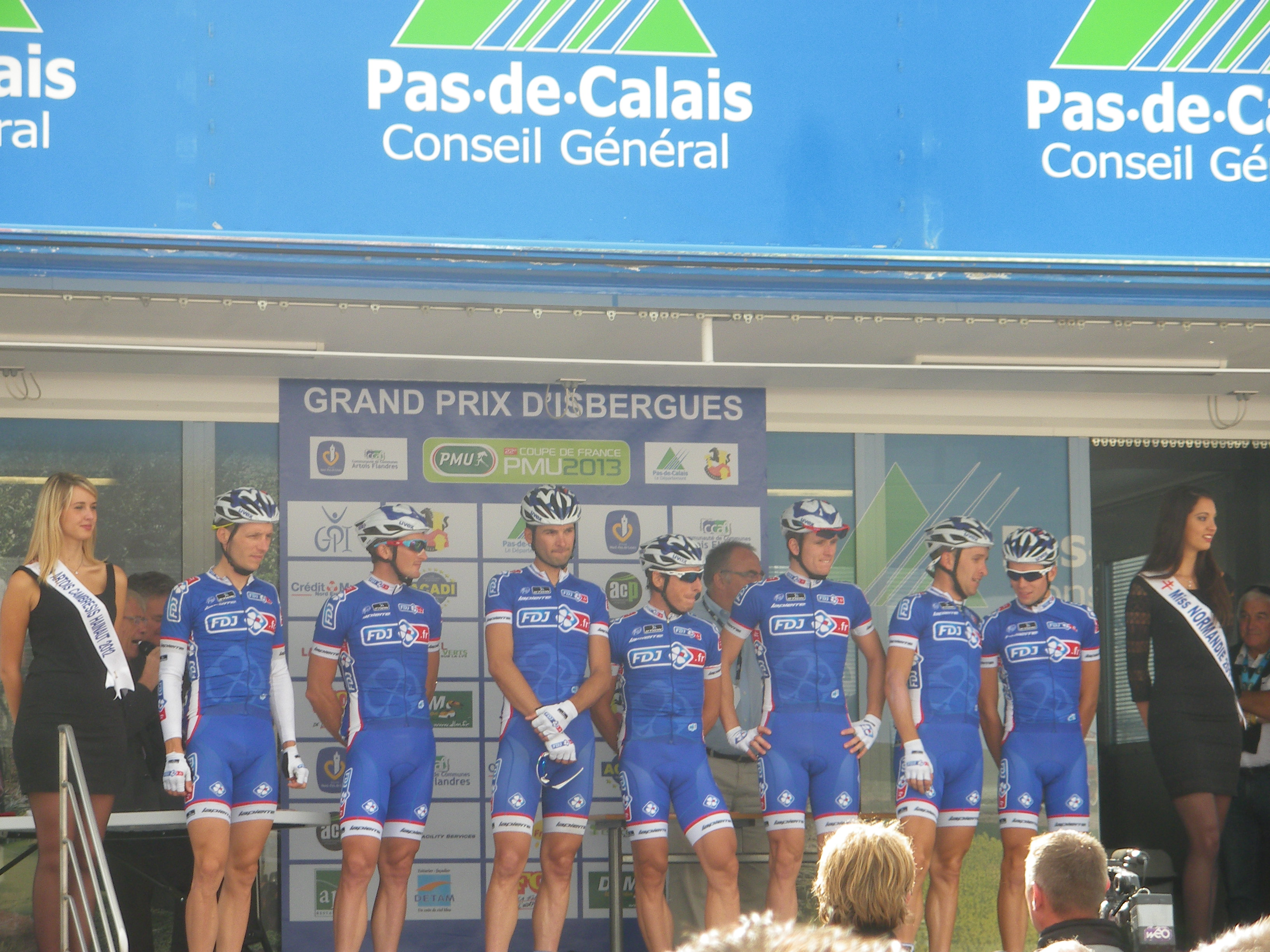
- The team at the 2013 Grand Prix d'Isbergues
- UCI code: FDJ
- Status: UCI ProTeam
- World Tour Rank: 17th (338 points)
- Manager: Marc Madiot
- Main sponsor(s): Française des Jeux
- Based: France
- Bicycles: Lapierre
- Groupset: Shimano

Season victories
- One-day races: 10
- Stage race overall: 2
- Stage race stages: 19
- National Championships: 3
- Most wins: Nacer Bouhanni (11 wins)
- Best ranked rider: Thibaut Pinot (33rd)

The 2013 season for FDJ.fr began in January at the Tour Down Under. As a UCI ProTeam, they were automatically invited and obligated to send a squad to every event in the UCI World Tour.

Having raced as FDJ-BigMat in 2012, the team lost their sponsorship, and competed as FDJ for the first half of the season. Prior to the Tour de France, it was announced that the team would change name slightly, becoming FDJ.fr.

== 2013 roster ==
As of 1 January 2013.

| Rider | Date of birth |
|---|---|
| William Bonnet (FRA) | 25 June 1982 (aged 30) |
| David Boucher (BEL) | 17 March 1980 (aged 32) |
| Nacer Bouhanni (FRA) | 25 July 1990 (aged 22) |
| Sandy Casar (FRA) | 2 February 1979 (aged 33) |
| Arnaud Courteille (FRA) | 13 March 1989 (aged 23) |
| Mickaël Delage (FRA) | 6 August 1985 (aged 27) |
| Arnaud Démare (FRA) | 26 August 1991 (aged 21) |
| Kenny Elissonde (FRA) | 22 July 1991 (aged 21) |
| Pierrick Fédrigo (FRA) | 30 November 1978 (aged 34) |
| Murilo Fischer (BRA) | 16 June 1979 (aged 33) |
| Alexandre Geniez (FRA) | 16 April 1988 (aged 24) |
| Anthony Geslin (FRA) | 9 June 1980 (aged 32) |
| Alexis Guérin (Note: Guérin joined the team on 1 August as a stagiaire, from the Entente Sud Gascogne team.) (FRA) | 6 June 1992 (aged 20) |
| Arnold Jeannesson (FRA) | 15 January 1986 (aged 26) |
| Mathieu Ladagnous (FRA) | 12 December 1984 (aged 28) |
| Johan Le Bon (FRA) | 3 October 1990 (aged 22) |

| Rider | Date of birth |
|---|---|
| Olivier Le Gac (Note: Le Gac joined the team on 1 August as a stagiaire, from the Brest Iroise Cyclisme 2000 team.) (FRA) | 27 August 1993 (aged 19) |
| Laurent Mangel (FRA) | 22 May 1981 (aged 31) |
| Francis Mourey (FRA) | 8 December 1980 (aged 32) |
| Yoann Offredo (FRA) | 12 November 1986 (aged 26) |
| Laurent Pichon (FRA) | 19 July 1986 (aged 26) |
| Cédric Pineau (FRA) | 8 May 1985 (aged 27) |
| Thibaut Pinot (FRA) | 29 May 1990 (aged 22) |
| Benoît Poitevin (Note: Poitevin joined the team on 1 August as a stagiaire, from UC Nantes.) (FRA) | 5 May 1991 (aged 21) |
| Dominique Rollin (CAN) | 29 October 1982 (aged 30) |
| Anthony Roux (FRA) | 18 April 1987 (aged 25) |
| Jérémy Roy (FRA) | 22 June 1983 (aged 29) |
| Geoffrey Soupe (FRA) | 22 March 1988 (aged 24) |
| Benoît Vaugrenard (FRA) | 5 January 1982 (aged 30) |
| Jussi Veikkanen (FIN) | 29 March 1981 (aged 31) |
| Arthur Vichot (FRA) | 26 November 1988 (aged 24) |
| Émilien Viennet (FRA) | 6 February 1992 (aged 20) |

Riders who joined the team for the 2013 season

| Rider | 2012 team |
|---|---|
| Murilo Fischer | Garmin–Sharp |
| Alexandre Geniez | Argos–Shimano |
| Johan Le Bon | Bretagne–Schuller |
| Laurent Mangel | Saur–Sojasun |
| Laurent Pichon | Bretagne–Schuller |
| Émilien Viennet | neo-pro (stagiaire, FDJ–BigMat) |

Riders who left the team during or after the 2012 season

| Rider | 2013 team |
|---|---|
| Steve Chainel | Ag2r–La Mondiale |
| Arnaud Gérard | Bretagne–Séché Environnement |
| Frédéric Guesdon | Retired |
| Yauheni Hutarovich | Ag2r–La Mondiale |
| Rémi Pauriol | Sojasun |
| Gabriel Rasch | Team Sky |

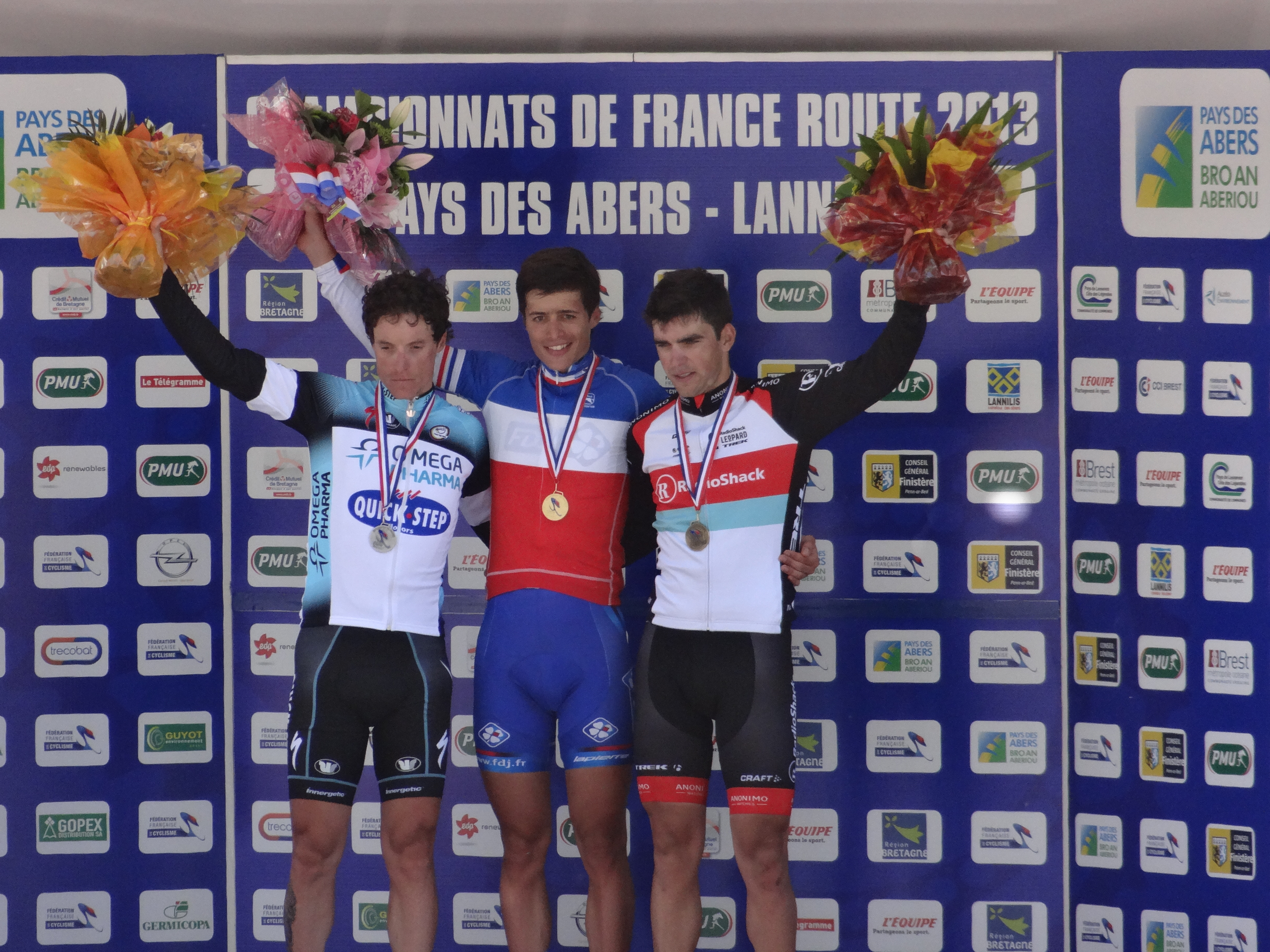
Arthur Vichot became the French National Champion.

== Season victories ==
| Date | Race | Competition | Rider | Country | Location |
|---|---|---|---|---|---|
| 3 February | Étoile de Bessèges, Stage 6 | UCI Europe Tour | Anthony Roux (FRA) | France | Alès |
| 3 February | Étoile de Bessèges, Teams classification | UCI Europe Tour | (Note: The riders on the squad were Pierrick Fédrigo, Anthony Geslin, Anthony Roux, Laurent Pichon, Cédric Pineau, Jérémy Roy, Benoît Vaugrenard and Arthur Vichot) | France | |
| 16 February | Tour of Oman, Stage 6 | UCI Asia Tour | Nacer Bouhanni (FRA) | Oman | Muttrah |
| 16 February | Tour of Oman, Young rider classification | UCI Asia Tour | Kenny Elissonde (FRA) | Oman | |
| 17 February | Tour du Haut Var, Overall | UCI Europe Tour | Arthur Vichot (FRA) | France | |
| 17 February | Tour du Haut Var, Points classification | UCI Europe Tour | Arthur Vichot (FRA) | France | |
| 17 February | Tour du Haut Var, Young rider classification | UCI Europe Tour | Arthur Vichot (FRA) | France | |
| 4 March | Paris–Nice, Stage 1 | UCI World Tour | Nacer Bouhanni (FRA) | France | Nemours |
| 24 March | Critérium International, Mountains classification | UCI Europe Tour | Jérémy Roy (FRA) | France | |
| 31 March | Val d'Ille Classic | UCI Europe Tour | Nacer Bouhanni (FRA) | France | La Mézière |
| 3 April | Circuit de la Sarthe, Stage 2 | UCI Europe Tour | Nacer Bouhanni (FRA) | France | Angers |
| 5 April | Circuit de la Sarthe, Stage 5 | UCI Europe Tour | Francis Mourey (FRA) | France | Saint-Vincent-du-Lorouër |
| 9 April | Paris–Camembert | UCI Europe Tour | Pierrick Fédrigo (FRA) | France | Vimoutiers |
| 11 April | Grand Prix de Denain | UCI Europe Tour | Arnaud Démare (FRA) | France | Denain |
| 14 April | Tro-Bro Léon | UCI Europe Tour | Francis Mourey (FRA) | France | Finistère |
| 21 April | La Roue Tourangelle | UCI Europe Tour | Mickaël Delage (FRA) | France | Tours |
| 1 May | Four Days of Dunkirk, Stage 1 | UCI Europe Tour | Arnaud Démare (FRA) | France | Courrières |
| 2 May | Four Days of Dunkirk, Stage 2 | UCI Europe Tour | Arnaud Démare (FRA) | France | Douchy-les-Mines |
| 3 May | Four Days of Dunkirk, Stage 3 | UCI Europe Tour | Arnaud Démare (FRA) | France | Liévin |
| 5 May | Four Days of Dunkirk, Overall | UCI Europe Tour | Arnaud Démare (FRA) | France | |
| 5 May | Four Days of Dunkirk, Points classification | UCI Europe Tour | Arnaud Démare (FRA) | France | |
| 5 May | Four Days of Dunkirk, Young rider classification | UCI Europe Tour | Arnaud Démare (FRA) | France | |
| 12 May | Tour de Picardie, Mountains classification | UCI Europe Tour | David Boucher (FRA) | France | |
| 26 May | Boucles de l'Aulne | UCI Europe Tour | Mathieu Ladagnous (FRA) | France | Châteaulin |
| 11 June | Tour de Suisse, Stage 4 | UCI World Tour | Arnaud Démare (FRA) | Switzerland | Buochs |
| 16 June | Route du Sud, Points classification | UCI Europe Tour | Anthony Roux (FRA) | France | |
| 24 July | Tour de Wallonie, Teams classification | UCI Europe Tour | (Note: The riders on the squad were Arnaud Démare, Anthony Geslin, Laurent Mangel, Yoann Offredo, Laurent Pichon, Anthony Roux and Benoît Vaugrenard) | Belgium | |
| 4 August | RideLondon–Surrey Classic | UCI Europe Tour | Arnaud Démare (FRA) | Great Britain | London |
| 10 August | Vuelta a Burgos, Stage 4 | UCI Europe Tour | Anthony Roux (FRA) | Spain | Santo Domingo de Silos |
| 11 August | Vuelta a Burgos, Points classification | UCI Europe Tour | Anthony Roux (FRA) | Spain | |
| 13 August | Tour de l'Ain, Young rider classification | UCI Europe Tour | Kenny Elissonde (FRA) | France | |
| 13 August | Eneco Tour, Stage 2 | UCI World Tour | Arnaud Démare (FRA) | Belgium | Vorst |
| 22 August | Tour du Limousin, Stage 3 | UCI Europe Tour | Mathieu Ladagnous (FRA) | France | Chamboulive |
| 27 August | Tour du Poitou-Charentes, Stage 1 | UCI Europe Tour | Nacer Bouhanni (FRA) | France | Saintes |
| 28 August | Tour du Poitou-Charentes, Stage 2 | UCI Europe Tour | Nacer Bouhanni (FRA) | France | Angoulême |
| 29 August | Tour du Poitou-Charentes, Stage 3 | UCI Europe Tour | Nacer Bouhanni (FRA) | France | Civray |
| 30 August | Tour du Poitou-Charentes, Points classification | UCI Europe Tour | Nacer Bouhanni (FRA) | France | |
| 8 September | Grand Prix de Fourmies | UCI Europe Tour | Nacer Bouhanni (FRA) | France | Fourmies |
| 8 September | Vuelta a España, Stage 15 | UCI World Tour | Alexandre Geniez (FRA) | France | Peyragudes |
| 14 September | Vuelta a España, Stage 20 | UCI World Tour | Kenny Elissonde (FRA) | Spain | Alto de L'Angliru |
| 22 September | Grand Prix d'Isbergues | UCI Europe Tour | Arnaud Démare (FRA) | France | Isbergues |
| 6 October | Tour de Vendée | UCI Europe Tour | Nacer Bouhanni (FRA) | France | La Roche-sur-Yon |
| 6 October | French Road Cycling Cup, Teams classification | UCI Europe Tour | (Note: The riders who amassed points towards the individual classification were Anthony Geslin, Arnaud Démare, Nacer Bouhanni, Francis Mourey, Mathieu Ladagnous, Laurent Pichon, Pierrick Fédrigo, Johan Le Bon, Arthur Vichot, Cédric Pineau, Laurent Mangel, Anthony Roux, Arnold Jeannesson, Dominique Rollin, Kenny Elissonde and Mickaël Delage) | France | |
| 12 October | Tour of Beijing, Stage 2 | UCI World Tour | Nacer Bouhanni (FRA) | China | Yanqing |
| 13 October | Tour of Beijing, Stage 3 | UCI World Tour | Nacer Bouhanni (FRA) | China | Qianjiadian |
| 15 October | Tour of Beijing, Points classification | UCI World Tour | Nacer Bouhanni (FRA) | China | |
