= 2013 Team Sky season =

Team Sky
- 2013 season
- UCI code: SKY
- Status: UCI WorldTeam
- World Ranking: 2nd (1561 points)
- Manager: Dave Brailsford
- Main sponsor(s): BSkyB
- Based: United Kingdom
- Bicycles: Pinarello
- Groupset: Shimano

Season victories
- Stage race overall: 9
- Stage race stages: 25
- Most wins: Chris Froome (7 wins)
- Best ranked rider: Chris Froome (2nd)

The 2013 season for Team Sky began in January at the Tour Down Under. As a UCI ProTeam, they were automatically invited and obliged to send a squad to every event in the UCI World Tour.

== 2013 roster ==
As of 1 January 2013.

Rider	Date of birth
Edvald Boasson Hagen (NOR)	17 May 1987 (age 39)
Ian Boswell (USA)	7 February 1991 (age 35)
Dario Cataldo (ITA)	17 March 1985 (age 41)
Joe Dombrowski (USA)	12 May 1991 (age 35)
Josh Edmondson (GBR)	6 July 1992 (age 33)
Bernhard Eisel (AUT)	17 February 1981 (age 45)
Chris Froome (GBR)	20 May 1985 (age 41)
Mathew Hayman (AUS)	20 April 1978 (age 48)
Sergio Henao (COL)	10 December 1987 (age 38)
Peter Kennaugh (GBR)	15 June 1989 (age 36)
Vasil Kiryienka (BLR)	28 June 1981 (age 44)
Christian Knees (GER)	5 March 1981 (age 45)
David López (ESP)	13 May 1981 (age 45)
Danny Pate (USA)	23 March 1979 (age 47)

Rider	Date of birth
Richie Porte (AUS)	30 January 1985 (age 41)
Salvatore Puccio (ITA)	31 August 1989 (age 36)
Gabriel Rasch (NOR)	8 April 1976 (age 50)
Luke Rowe (GBR)	10 March 1990 (age 36)
Kanstantsin Sivtsov (BLR)	9 August 1982 (age 43)
Ian Stannard (GBR)	25 May 1987 (age 39)
Chris Sutton (AUS)	10 September 1984 (age 41)
Ben Swift (GBR)	5 November 1987 (age 38)
Geraint Thomas (GBR)	25 May 1986 (age 40)
Jonathan Tiernan-Locke (GBR)	26 December 1984 (age 41)
Rigoberto Urán (COL)	26 January 1987 (age 39)
Bradley Wiggins (GBR)	28 April 1980 (age 46)
Xabier Zandio (ESP)	17 March 1977 (age 49)

Riders who joined the team for the 2013 season

Rider	2012 team
Vasil Kiryienka	Movistar Team
David López	Movistar Team
Dario Cataldo	Omega Pharma–Quick-Step
Gabriel Rasch	FDJ–BigMat
Joe Dombrowski	neo-pro (Bontrager–Livestrong)
Ian Boswell	stagiaire (Argos–Shimano; Bontrager–Livestrong)
Jonathan Tiernan-Locke	Endura Racing
Josh Edmondson	neo-pro

Riders who left the team during or after the 2012 season

Rider	2013 team
Mark Cavendish	Omega Pharma–Quick-Step
Lars Petter Nordhaug	Blanco Pro Cycling
Davide Appollonio	Ag2r–La Mondiale
Juan Antonio Flecha	Vacansoleil–DCM
Alex Dowsett	Movistar Team
Michael Rogers	Saxo–Tinkoff
Thomas Löfkvist	IAM Cycling
Michael Barry	Retired
Jeremy Hunt	Retired

== Season victories ==
Date	Race	Competition	Rider	Country	Location
23 January	Tour Down Under, Stage 2	UCI World Tour	Geraint Thomas (GBR)	Australia	Rostrevor
27 January	Tour Down Under, Sprints classification	UCI World Tour	Geraint Thomas (GBR)	Australia	
15 February	Tour of Oman, Stage 5	UCI Asia Tour	Chris Froome (GBR)	Oman	Boshar
16 February	Tour of Oman, Overall	UCI Asia Tour	Chris Froome (GBR)	Oman	
16 February	Tour of Oman, Points classification	UCI Asia Tour	Chris Froome (GBR)	Oman	
16 February	Volta ao Algarve, Stage 3	UCI Europe Tour	Sergio Henao (COL)	Portugal	Alto do Malhão
8 March	Paris–Nice, Stage 5	UCI World Tour	Richie Porte (AUS)	France	La Montagne de Lure
9 March	Tirreno–Adriatico, Stage 4	UCI World Tour	Chris Froome (GBR)	Italy	Prati di Tivo
10 March	Paris–Nice, Stage 7	UCI World Tour	Richie Porte (AUS)	France	Col d'Èze
10 March	Paris–Nice, Overall	UCI World Tour	Richie Porte (AUS)	France	
23 March	Critérium International, Stage 2	UCI Europe Tour	Richie Porte (AUS)	France	Porto-Vecchio
24 March	Critérium International, Stage 3	UCI Europe Tour	Chris Froome (GBR)	France	Col de l'Ospedale
24 March	Critérium International, Overall	UCI Europe Tour	Chris Froome (GBR)	France	
24 March	Critérium International, Points classification	UCI Europe Tour	Richie Porte (AUS)	France	
3 April	Tour of the Basque Country, Stage 3	UCI World Tour	Sergio Henao (COL)	Spain	Trapagaran
5 April	Tour of the Basque Country, Stage 5	UCI World Tour	Richie Porte (AUS)	Spain	Beasain
16 April	Giro del Trentino, Stage 1b	UCI Europe Tour	Team time trial (Note: The riders on the squad were Dario Cataldo, Joe Dombrowski, Peter Kennaugh, Christian Knees, Danny Pate, Kanstantsin Sivtsov, Bradley Wiggins and Xabier Zandio)	Austria	Lienz
17 April	Giro del Trentino, Stage 2	UCI Europe Tour	Kanstantsin Sivtsov (BLR)	Italy	Vetriolo Terme
23 April	Tour de Romandie, Prologue	UCI World Tour	Chris Froome (GBR)	Switzerland	Bruson
28 April	Tour de Romandie, Overall	UCI World Tour	Chris Froome (GBR)	Switzerland	
28 April	Tour de Romandie, Teams classification	UCI World Tour	(Note: The riders on the squad were Chris Froome, Richie Porte, David López, Vasil Kiryienka, Peter Kennaugh, Josh Edmondson, Chris Sutton and Gabriel Rasch)	Switzerland	
5 May	Giro d'Italia, Stage 2	UCI World Tour	Team time trial (Note: The riders on the squad were Dario Cataldo, Sergio Henao, Christian Knees, Danny Pate, Salvatore Puccio, Rigoberto Urán, Kanstantsin Sivtsov, Bradley Wiggins and Xabier Zandio)	Italy	Forio
14 May	Giro d'Italia, Stage 10	UCI World Tour	Rigoberto Urán (COL)	Italy	Altopiano del Montasio
18 May	Glava Tour of Norway, Stage 4	UCI Europe Tour	Edvald Boasson Hagen (NOR)	Norway	Lillehammer
19 May	Glava Tour of Norway, Overall	UCI Europe Tour	Edvald Boasson Hagen (NOR)	Norway	
19 May	Glava Tour of Norway, Points classification	UCI Europe Tour	Edvald Boasson Hagen (NOR)	Norway	
26 May	Giro d'Italia, Trofeo Fast Team	UCI World Tour		Italy	
4 June	Critérium du Dauphiné, Stage 3	UCI World Tour	Edvald Boasson Hagen (NOR)	France	Tarare
6 June	Critérium du Dauphiné, Stage 5	UCI World Tour	Chris Froome (GBR)	France	Valmorel
9 June	Critérium du Dauphiné, Overall	UCI World Tour	Chris Froome (GBR)	France	
9 June	Critérium du Dauphiné, Teams classification	UCI World Tour	(Note: The riders on the squad were Chris Froome, Richie Porte, David López, Vasil Kiryienka, Peter Kennaugh, Geraint Thomas, Edvald Boasson Hagen and Ian Stannard)	France	
6 July	Tour de France, Stage 8	UCI World Tour	Chris Froome (GBR)	France	Ax 3 Domaines
14 July	Tour de France, Stage 15	UCI World Tour	Chris Froome (GBR)	France	Mont Ventoux
17 July	Tour de France, Stage 17	UCI World Tour	Chris Froome (GBR)	France	Chorges
21 July	Tour de France, Overall	UCI World Tour	Chris Froome (GBR)	France	
3 August	Tour de Pologne, Stage 7	UCI World Tour	Bradley Wiggins (GBR)	Poland	Kraków
17 August	Eneco Tour, Stage 6	UCI World Tour	David López (ESP)	Belgium	La Redoute–Aywaille
12 September	Vuelta a España, Stage 18	UCI World Tour	Vasil Kiryienka (BLR)	Spain	Peña Cabarga
17 September	Tour of Britain, Stage 3	UCI Europe Tour	Bradley Wiggins (GBR)	Great Britain	Knowsley
22 September	Tour of Britain, Overall	UCI Europe Tour	Bradley Wiggins (GBR)	Great Britain	
22 September	Tour of Britain, Teams classification	UCI Europe Tour	(Note: The riders on the squad were Bradley Wiggins, David López, Ian Stannard, Josh Edmondson, Bernhard Eisel and Mathew Hayman)	Great Britain	
