= 2013 RadioShack–Leopard season =

RadioShack–Leopard
- 2013 season
- Manager: Luca Guercilena

Season victories
- One-day races: 5
- Stage race overall: 1
- Stage race stages: 11
- Jersey

The 2013 season for the RadioShack–Leopard cycling team began in January at the Tour Down Under. As a UCI ProTeam, they were automatically invited and obligated to send a squad to every event in the UCI World Tour.

On 21 December 2012, Nissan announced that they would cease to sponsor the team, with immediate effect.

== Team roster ==
As of 1 January 2013.

Rider	Date of birth
Jan Bakelants (BEL)	14 February 1986 (age 40)
George Bennett (NZL)	7 April 1990 (age 35)
Matthew Busche (USA)	9 May 1985 (age 40)
Fabian Cancellara (SUI)	18 March 1981 (age 45)
Stijn Devolder (BEL)	29 August 1979 (age 46)
Laurent Didier (LUX)	19 July 1984 (age 41)
Tony Gallopin (FRA)	24 May 1988 (age 37)
Ben Hermans (BEL)	8 June 1986 (age 39)
Danilo Hondo (GER)	4 January 1974 (age 52)
Chris Horner (USA)	10 November 1971 (age 54)
Markel Irizar (ESP)	5 February 1980 (age 46)
Bob Jungels (LUX)	22 September 1992 (age 33)
Ben King (USA)	22 March 1989 (age 37)
Robert Kišerlovski (CRO)	9 August 1986 (age 39)

Rider	Date of birth
Andreas Klöden (GER)	22 June 1975 (age 50)
Tiago Machado (POR)	18 October 1985 (age 40)
Maxime Monfort (BEL)	14 January 1983 (age 43)
Giacomo Nizzolo (ITA)	30 January 1989 (age 37)
Nelson Oliveira (POR)	6 March 1989 (age 37)
Yaroslav Popovych (UKR)	4 January 1980 (age 46)
Grégory Rast (SUI)	17 January 1980 (age 46)
Thomas Rohregger (AUT)	23 December 1982 (age 43)
Hayden Roulston (NZL)	10 January 1981 (age 45)
Andy Schleck (LUX)	10 June 1985 (age 40)
Jesse Sergent (NZL)	8 July 1988 (age 37)
Jens Voigt (GER)	17 September 1971 (age 54)
Haimar Zubeldia (ESP)	1 April 1977 (age 48)

Riders who joined the team for the 2013 season

Rider	2012 team
Stijn Devolder	Vacansoleil–DCM
Danilo Hondo	Lampre–ISD
Bob Jungels	Leopard Trek Continental
Robert Kišerlovski	Astana

Riders who left the team during or after the 2012 season

Rider	2013 team
Daniele Bennati	Saxo–Tinkoff
Jakob Fuglsang	Astana
Linus Gerdemann	
Joost Posthuma	Retired
Fränk Schleck	Suspended; later sacked
Robert Wagner	Blanco Pro Cycling
Oliver Zaugg	Saxo–Tinkoff

== Season victories ==
Date	Race	Competition	Rider	Country	Location
27 January	Tour Down Under, Teams classification	UCI World Tour	(Note: The riders on the squad were Andy Schleck, George Bennett, Laurent Didier, Ben Hermans, Tiago Machado, Jesse Sergent and Jens Voigt)	Australia	
17 February	Volta ao Algarve, Points classification	UCI Europe Tour	Giacomo Nizzolo (ITA)	Portugal	
17 February	Volta ao Algarve, Teams classification	UCI Europe Tour	(Note: The riders on the squad were Jan Bakelants, Danilo Hondo, Haimar Zubeldia, Andreas Klöden, Tiago Machado, Giacomo Nizzolo, Nélson Oliveira and Jesse Sergent)	Portugal	
14 March	Gran Premio Nobili Rubinetterie	UCI Europe Tour	Bob Jungels (LUX)	Italy	Arona
22 March	E3 Harelbeke	UCI World Tour	Fabian Cancellara (SUI)	Belgium	Harelbeke
31 March	Tour of Flanders	UCI World Tour	Fabian Cancellara (SUI)	Belgium	Oudenaarde
7 April	Paris–Roubaix	UCI World Tour	Fabian Cancellara (SUI)	France	Roubaix
16 May	Tour of California, Stage 5	UCI America Tour	Jens Voigt (GER)	United States	Avila Beach
13 June	Tour de Suisse, Stage 6	UCI World Tour	Grégory Rast (SUI)	Switzerland	Meilen
14 June	Tour de Luxembourg, Stage 2	UCI Europe Tour	Giacomo Nizzolo (ITA)	Luxembourg	Walferdange
15 June	Tour de Luxembourg, Stage 3	UCI Europe Tour	Giacomo Nizzolo (ITA)	Luxembourg	Diekirch
16 June	Tour de Luxembourg, Stage 4	UCI Europe Tour	Bob Jungels (LUX)	Luxembourg	Luxembourg
16 June	Tour de Luxembourg, Points classification	UCI Europe Tour	Giacomo Nizzolo (ITA)	Luxembourg	
30 June	Tour de France, Stage 2	UCI World Tour	Jan Bakelants (BEL)	France	Ajaccio
6 July	Tour of Austria, Stage 7	UCI Europe Tour	Fabian Cancellara (SUI)	Austria	Podersdorf am See
24 July	Tour de Wallonie, Mountains classification	UCI Europe Tour	Tiago Machado (POR)	Belgium	
27 July	Clásica de San Sebastián	UCI World Tour	Tony Gallopin (FRA)	Spain	San Sebastián
3 August	Tour de Pologne, Teams classification	UCI World Tour	(Note: The riders on the squad were Fabian Cancellara, Ben Hermans, Robert Kišerlovski, Yaroslav Popovych, Thomas Rohregger and Jesse Sergent)	Poland	
10 August	Tour of Utah, Stage 5	UCI America Tour	Chris Horner (USA)	United States	Snowbird
11 August	Tour of Utah, Teams classification	UCI America Tour	(Note: The riders on the squad were Chris Horner, George Bennett, Matthew Busche, Ben King, Tiago Machado, Nelson Oliveira, Hayden Roulston and Jens Voigt)	United States	
26 August	Vuelta a España, Stage 3	UCI World Tour	Chris Horner (USA)	Spain	Mirador de Lobeira–Vilagarcía de Arousa
2 September	Vuelta a España, Stage 10	UCI World Tour	Chris Horner (USA)	Spain	Güéjar Sierra–Alto Hazallanas
4 September	Vuelta a España, Stage 11	UCI World Tour	Fabian Cancellara (SUI)	Spain	Tarazona
15 September	Vuelta a España, Overall	UCI World Tour	Chris Horner (USA)	Spain	
15 September	Vuelta a España, Combination classification	UCI World Tour	Chris Horner (USA)	Spain	
