= 2013 Argos–Shimano season =

2013 Argos–Shimano season
Manager	Iwan Spekenbrink
One-day victories	8
Stage race overall victories	1
Stage race stage victories	20
Previous season • Next season

The 2013 season for the Argos–Shimano began in January with the Tour Down Under. As a UCI ProTeam, they were automatically invited and obligated to send a squad to every event in the UCI World Tour.

== Team roster ==
As of 6 August 2013.

Rider	Date of birth
Jonas Ahlstrand (SWE)	16 February 1990 (aged 22)
Nikias Arndt (GER)	18 November 1991 (aged 21)
Warren Barguil (FRA)	28 October 1991 (aged 21)
Will Clarke (AUS)	11 April 1985 (aged 27)
Roy Curvers (NED)	27 December 1979 (aged 33)
Thomas Damuseau (FRA)	18 March 1989 (aged 23)
Bert De Backer (BEL)	2 April 1984 (aged 28)
Koen de Kort (NED)	8 September 1982 (aged 30)
John Degenkolb (GER)	7 January 1989 (aged 23)
Tom Dumoulin (NED)	11 November 1990 (aged 22)
Johannes Fröhlinger (GER)	9 June 1985 (aged 27)
Simon Geschke (GER)	13 March 1986 (aged 26)
Patrick Gretsch (GER)	7 April 1987 (aged 25)
Nikodemus Holler (Note: Holler joined the team on 1 August as a stagiaire, from the Thüringer Energie Team.) (GER)	4 May 1991 (aged 21)
Yann Huguet (FRA)	2 May 1984 (aged 28)
Thierry Hupond (FRA)	10 November 1984 (aged 28)

Rider	Date of birth
Reinardt Janse van Rensburg (RSA)	3 February 1989 (aged 23)
Quentin Jaurégui (Note: Jaurégui joined the team on 1 August as a stagiaire, from BKCP–Powerplus.) (FRA)	22 April 1994 (aged 18)
Ji Cheng (CHN)	15 July 1987 (aged 25)
Marcel Kittel (GER)	11 May 1988 (aged 24)
Tobias Ludvigsson (SWE)	22 February 1991 (aged 21)
Luka Mezgec (SLO)	27 June 1988 (aged 24)
Michael Olsson (Note: Olsson joined the team on 1 August as a stagiaire, from Team People4you-Unaas Cycling.) (SWE)	4 March 1986 (aged 26)
François Parisien (CAN)	27 April 1982 (aged 30)
Thomas Peterson (USA)	24 December 1986 (aged 26)
Georg Preidler (AUT)	17 June 1990 (aged 22)
Ramon Sinkeldam (NED)	9 February 1989 (aged 23)
Matthieu Sprick (FRA)	29 September 1981 (aged 31)
Tom Stamsnijder (NED)	15 May 1985 (aged 27)
Albert Timmer (NED)	13 June 1985 (aged 27)
Tom Veelers (NED)	14 September 1984 (aged 28)
Yan Dong Xing (Note: Xing joined the team on 20 March.) (CHN)	20 March 1985 (aged 27)

Riders who joined the team for the 2013 season

Rider	2012 team
Jonas Ahlstrand	Team CykelCity
Nikias Arndt	LKT Team Brandenburg
Warren Barguil	neo-pro (stagiaire, Argos–Shimano)
Will Clarke	Champion System
Reinardt Janse van Rensburg	MTN–Qhubeka
Luka Mezgec	Sava
François Parisien	SpiderTech–C10
Tom Peterson	Garmin–Sharp
Georg Preidler	Team Type 1–Sanofi

Riders who left the team during or after the 2012 season

Rider	2013 team
Thomas Bonnin	NSP-Ghost
Yukihiro Doi	Team Ukyo
Alexandre Geniez	FDJ
Dominic Klemme	IAM Cycling
Roger Kluge	NetApp–Endura
Ronan van Zandbeek	Cycling Team De Rijke–Shanks

== Season victories ==
Date	Race	Competition	Rider	Country	Location
3 February	Étoile de Bessèges, Mountains classification	UCI Europe Tour	Georg Preidler (AUT)	France	
11 February	Tour of Oman, Stage 1	UCI Asia Tour	Marcel Kittel (GER)	Oman	Al Khoudh
20 February	Vuelta a Andalucía, Mountains classification	UCI Europe Tour	Tom Dumoulin (NED)	Spain	
3 March	Driedaagse van West-Vlaanderen, Young rider classification	UCI Europe Tour	Tobias Ludvigsson (SWE)	Belgium	
5 March	Paris–Nice, Stage 2	UCI World Tour	Marcel Kittel (GER)	France	Cérilly
22 March	Volta a Catalunya, Stage 5	UCI World Tour	François Parisien (CAN)	Spain	Lleida
3 April	Scheldeprijs	UCI Europe Tour	Marcel Kittel (GER)	Belgium	Antwerp
5 April	Circuit de la Sarthe, Young rider classification	UCI Europe Tour	Tobias Ludvigsson (SWE)	France	
21 April	Tour of Turkey, Stage 1	UCI Europe Tour	Marcel Kittel (GER)	Turkey	Alanya
27 April	Tour of Turkey, Stage 7	UCI Europe Tour	Marcel Kittel (GER)	Turkey	İzmir
28 April	Tour of Turkey, Stage 8	UCI Europe Tour	Marcel Kittel (GER)	Turkey	Istanbul
8 May	Giro d'Italia, Stage 5	UCI World Tour	John Degenkolb (GER)	Italy	Matera
10 May	Tour de Picardie, Stage 1	UCI Europe Tour	Marcel Kittel (GER)	France	Flixecourt
12 May	Tour de Picardie, Stage 3	UCI Europe Tour	Marcel Kittel (GER)	France	Soissons
12 May	Tour de Picardie, Overall	UCI Europe Tour	Marcel Kittel (GER)	France	
12 May	Tour de Picardie, Points classification	UCI Europe Tour	Marcel Kittel (GER)	France	
26 May	Tour of Belgium, Young rider classification	UCI Europe Tour	Tom Dumoulin (NED)	Belgium	
9 June	Critérium du Dauphiné, Mountains classification	UCI World Tour	Thomas Damuseau (FRA)	France	
9 June	ProRace Berlin	UCI Europe Tour	Marcel Kittel (GER)	Germany	Berlin
14 June	Ster ZLM Toer, Stage 3	UCI Europe Tour	Marcel Kittel (GER)	Netherlands	Buchten
29 June	Tour de France, Stage 1	UCI World Tour	Marcel Kittel (GER)	France	Bastia
9 July	Tour de France, Stage 10	UCI World Tour	Marcel Kittel (GER)	France	Saint-Malo
11 July	Tour de France, Stage 12	UCI World Tour	Marcel Kittel (GER)	France	Tours
21 July	Tour de France, Stage 21	UCI World Tour	Marcel Kittel (GER)	France	Paris
10 August	Arctic Race of Norway, Stage 3	UCI Europe Tour	Nikias Arndt (GER)	Norway	Stokmarknes
11 August	Arctic Race of Norway, Young rider classification	UCI Europe Tour	Nikias Arndt (GER)	Norway	
25 August	Vattenfall Cyclassics	UCI World Tour	John Degenkolb (GER)	Germany	Hamburg
6 September	Vuelta a España, Stage 13	UCI World Tour	Warren Barguil (FRA)	Spain	Castelldefels
9 September	Vuelta a España, Stage 16	UCI World Tour	Warren Barguil (FRA)	Spain	Sallent de Gállego–Aramón Formigal
15 September	Grote Prijs Jef Scherens	UCI Europe Tour	Bert De Backer (BEL)	Belgium	Leuven
25 September	Omloop van het Houtland	UCI Europe Tour	Marcel Kittel (GER)	Belgium	Lichtervelde
4 October	Tour de l'Eurometropole, Stage 2	UCI Europe Tour	John Degenkolb (GER)	Belgium	Poperinge
6 October	Tour de l'Eurometropole, Stage 4	UCI Europe Tour	John Degenkolb (GER)	Belgium	Tournai
6 October	Tour de l'Eurometropole, Teams classification	UCI Europe Tour	(Note: The riders on the squad were John Degenkolb, Nikias Arndt, Bert De Backer, Will Clarke, Roy Curvers, Reinardt Janse van Rensburg, Ramon Sinkeldam and Tom Stamsnijder)	Belgium	
8 October	Binche–Chimay–Binche	UCI Europe Tour	Reinardt Janse van Rensburg (RSA)	Belgium	Binche
10 October	Paris–Bourges	UCI Europe Tour	John Degenkolb (GER)	France	Bourges
13 October	Paris–Tours	UCI Europe Tour	John Degenkolb (GER)	France	Tours
15 October	Tour of Beijing, Stage 5	UCI World Tour	Luka Mezgec (SLO)	China	Bird's Nest Piazza
