= 2013 Omega Pharma–Quick-Step season =

2013 Omega Pharma–Quick-Step season
Manager	Patrick Lefevere
One-day victories	4
Stage race overall victories	7
Stage race stage victories	39
Previous season • Next season

The 2013 season for Omega Pharma–Quick-Step began in January at the Tour de San Luis. As a UCI ProTeam, they were automatically invited and obliged to send a squad to every event in the UCI World Tour.

== 2013 roster ==
As of 2 August 2013.

Rider	Date of birth
Tom Boonen (BEL)	15 October 1980 (aged 32)
Gianluca Brambilla (ITA)	22 August 1987 (aged 25)
Mark Cavendish (GBR)	21 May 1985 (aged 27)
Sylvain Chavanel (FRA)	30 June 1979 (aged 33)
Kevin De Weert (BEL)	27 May 1982 (aged 30)
Dries Devenyns (BEL)	22 July 1983 (aged 29)
Andrew Fenn (GBR)	1 July 1990 (aged 22)
Michał Gołaś (POL)	29 September 1984 (aged 28)
Bert Grabsch (GER)	19 June 1975 (aged 37)
Iljo Keisse (BEL)	21 December 1982 (aged 30)
Michał Kwiatkowski (POL)	2 June 1990 (aged 22)
Nikolas Maes (BEL)	9 April 1986 (aged 26)
Tony Martin (GER)	23 April 1985 (aged 27)
Gianni Meersman (BEL)	5 December 1985 (aged 27)
Serge Pauwels (BEL)	23 November 1983 (aged 29)

Rider	Date of birth
Alessandro Petacchi (Note: Petacchi joined the team on 1 August, having left Lampre–Merida in April 2013.) (ITA)	3 January 1974 (aged 38)
Jérôme Pineau (FRA)	2 January 1980 (aged 32)
František Raboň (CZE)	26 September 1983 (aged 29)
Pieter Serry (BEL)	21 November 1988 (aged 24)
Gert Steegmans (BEL)	30 September 1980 (aged 32)
Zdeněk Štybar (CZE)	11 December 1985 (aged 27)
Niki Terpstra (NED)	18 May 1984 (aged 28)
Matteo Trentin (ITA)	2 August 1989 (aged 23)
Guillaume Van Keirsbulck (BEL)	14 February 1991 (aged 21)
Stijn Vandenbergh (BEL)	25 April 1984 (aged 28)
Kristof Vandewalle (BEL)	5 April 1985 (aged 27)
Martin Velits (SVK)	21 February 1985 (aged 27)
Peter Velits (SVK)	21 February 1985 (aged 27)
Julien Vermote (BEL)	26 July 1989 (aged 23)
Carlos Verona (ESP)	4 November 1992 (aged 20)

Riders who joined the team for the 2013 season

Rider	2012 team
Pieter Serry	Topsport Vlaanderen–Mercator
Gianluca Brambilla	Colnago–CSF Bardiani
Mark Cavendish	Team Sky
Carlos Verona	Burgos BH–Castilla y Leon
Gianni Meersman	Lotto–Belisol

Riders who left the team during or after the 2012 season

Rider	2013 team
Francesco Chicchi	Vini Fantini–Selle Italia
Dario Cataldo	Team Sky
Gerald Ciolek	MTN–Qhubeka
Levi Leipheimer	Suspended
Matt Brammeier	Champion System
Marco Bandiera	IAM Cycling

== Season victories ==
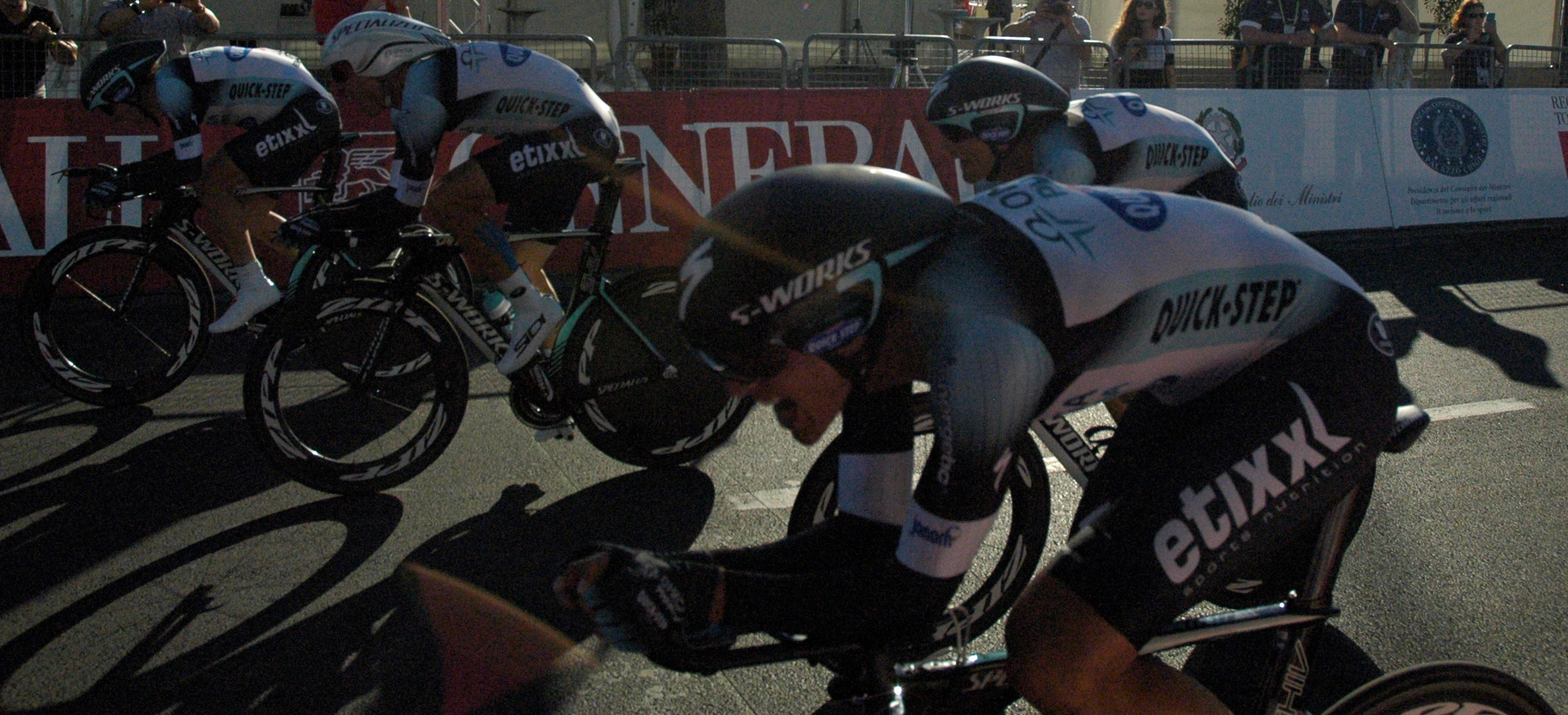
The team won the team time trial at the UCI Road World Championships

Date	Race	Competition	Rider	Country	Location
21 January	Tour de San Luis, Stage 1	UCI America Tour	Mark Cavendish (GBR)	Argentina	Villa Mercedes
5 February	Tour of Qatar, Stage 3	UCI Asia Tour	Mark Cavendish (GBR)	Qatar	Mesaieed
6 February	Tour of Qatar, Stage 4	UCI Asia Tour	Mark Cavendish (GBR)	Qatar	Al Khor Corniche
7 February	Tour of Qatar, Stage 5	UCI Asia Tour	Mark Cavendish (GBR)	Qatar	Madinat ash Shamal
8 February	Tour of Qatar, Stage 6	UCI Asia Tour	Mark Cavendish (GBR)	Qatar	Doha Corniche
8 February	Tour of Qatar, Overall	UCI Asia Tour	Mark Cavendish (GBR)	Qatar	
8 February	Tour of Qatar, Points classification	UCI Asia Tour	Mark Cavendish (GBR)	Qatar	
17 February	Volta ao Algarve, Stage 4	UCI Europe Tour	Tony Martin (GER)	Portugal	Tavira
17 February	Volta ao Algarve, Overall	UCI Europe Tour	Tony Martin (GER)	Portugal	
1 March	Driedaagse van West-Vlaanderen, Prologue	UCI Europe Tour	Kristof Vandewalle (BEL)	Belgium	Middelkerke
3 March	Driedaagse van West-Vlaanderen, Overall	UCI Europe Tour	Kristof Vandewalle (BEL)	Belgium	
3 March	Driedaagse van West-Vlaanderen, Teams classification	UCI Europe Tour	(Note: The riders on the squad were Kristof Vandewalle, Niki Terpstra, Mark Cavendish, František Raboň, Dries Devenyns, Julien Vermote, Iljo Keisse and Gert Steegmans)	Belgium	
6 March	Tirreno–Adriatico, Stage 1	UCI World Tour	Team time trial (Note: The riders on the squad were Mark Cavendish, Tony Martin, Michał Kwiatkowski, Zdeněk Štybar, Niki Terpstra, Guillaume Van Keirsbulck, Gert Steegmans and Martin Velits)	Italy	Donoratico
9 March	Paris–Nice, Stage 6	UCI World Tour	Sylvain Chavanel (FRA)	France	Nice
10 March	Paris–Nice, Points classification	UCI World Tour	Sylvain Chavanel (FRA)	France	
12 March	Tirreno–Adriatico, Stage 7	UCI World Tour	Tony Martin (GER)	Italy	San Benedetto del Tronto
12 March	Tirreno–Adriatico, Young rider classification	UCI World Tour	Michał Kwiatkowski (POL)	Italy	
18 March	Volta a Catalunya, Stage 1	UCI World Tour	Gianni Meersman (BEL)	Spain	Calella
19 March	Volta a Catalunya, Stage 2	UCI World Tour	Gianni Meersman (BEL)	Spain	Banyoles
27 March	Three Days of De Panne, Stage 2	UCI Europe Tour	Mark Cavendish (GBR)	Belgium	Koksijde
28 March	Three Days of De Panne, Stage 3b	UCI Europe Tour	Sylvain Chavanel (FRA)	Belgium	De Panne
28 March	Three Days of De Panne, Overall	UCI Europe Tour	Sylvain Chavanel (FRA)	Belgium	
28 March	Three Days of De Panne, Teams classification	UCI Europe Tour	(Note: The riders on the squad were Sylvain Chavanel, Niki Terpstra, Guillaume Van Keirsbulck, Mark Cavendish, Nikolas Maes, Iljo Keisse, Gert Steegmans and Tom Boonen)	Belgium	
6 April	Tour of the Basque Country, Stage 6	UCI World Tour	Tony Martin (GER)	Spain	Beasain
24 April	Tour de Romandie, Stage 1	UCI World Tour	Gianni Meersman (BEL)	Switzerland	Renens
26 April	Tour de Romandie, Stage 3	UCI World Tour	Gianni Meersman (BEL)	Switzerland	Payerne
28 April	Tour de Romandie, Stage 5	UCI World Tour	Tony Martin (GER)	Switzerland	Geneva
4 May	Giro d'Italia, Stage 1	UCI World Tour	Mark Cavendish (GBR)	Italy	Naples
9 May	Giro d'Italia, Stage 6	UCI World Tour	Mark Cavendish (GBR)	Italy	Margherita di Savoia
16 May	Giro d'Italia, Stage 12	UCI World Tour	Mark Cavendish (GBR)	Italy	Treviso
17 May	Giro d'Italia, Stage 13	UCI World Tour	Mark Cavendish (GBR)	Italy	Cherasco
24 May	Tour of Belgium, Stage 3	UCI Europe Tour	Tony Martin (GER)	Belgium	Beveren
26 May	Tour of Belgium, Overall	UCI Europe Tour	Tony Martin (GER)	Belgium	
26 May	Tour of Belgium, Teams classification	UCI Europe Tour	(Note: The riders on the squad were Tony Martin, Kristof Vandewalle, Niki Terpstra, Tom Boonen, Martin Velits, Andrew Fenn, Nikolas Maes and František Raboň)	Belgium	
26 May	Giro d'Italia, Stage 21	UCI World Tour	Mark Cavendish (GBR)	Italy	Brescia
26 May	Giro d'Italia, Points classification	UCI World Tour	Mark Cavendish (GBR)	Italy	
26 May	Giro d'Italia, Azzurri d'Italia classification	UCI World Tour	Mark Cavendish (GBR)	Italy	
26 May	Giro d'Italia, Combative classification	UCI World Tour	Mark Cavendish (GBR)	Italy	
28 May	Gullegem Koerse	National event	Andrew Fenn (GBR)	Belgium	Gullegem
1 June	Heistse Pijl	National event	Tom Boonen (BEL)	Belgium	Heist-op-den-Berg
5 June	Critérium du Dauphiné, Stage 4	UCI World Tour	Tony Martin (GER)	France	Parc des Oiseaux
9 June	Critérium du Dauphiné, Points classification	UCI World Tour	Gianni Meersman (BEL)	France	
16 June	Ster ZLM Toer, Teams classification	UCI Europe Tour	(Note: The riders on the squad were Mark Cavendish, Dries Devenyns, Andrew Fenn, Michał Gołaś, Jérôme Pineau, Gert Steegmans, Matteo Trentin and František Raboň)	Netherlands	
3 July	Tour de France, Stage 5	UCI World Tour	Mark Cavendish (GBR)	France	Marseille
10 July	Tour de France, Stage 11	UCI World Tour	Tony Martin (GER)	France	Mont Saint-Michel
12 July	Tour de France, Stage 13	UCI World Tour	Mark Cavendish (GBR)	France	Saint-Amand-Montrond
13 July	Tour de France, Stage 14	UCI World Tour	Matteo Trentin (ITA)	France	Lyon
21 July	Tour de Wallonie, Stage 2	UCI Europe Tour	Tom Boonen (BEL)	Belgium	Engis
4 August	Danmark Rundt, Stage 6	UCI Europe Tour	Mark Cavendish (GBR)	Denmark	Frederiksberg
9 August	Tour de l'Ain, Prologue	UCI Europe Tour	Gianni Meersman (BEL)	France	Trévoux
14 August	Eneco Tour, Stage 3	UCI World Tour	Zdeněk Štybar (CZE)	Netherlands	Brouwersdam
16 August	Eneco Tour, Stage 5	UCI World Tour	Sylvain Chavanel (FRA)	Netherlands	Sittard-Geleen
18 August	Eneco Tour, Stage 7	UCI World Tour	Zdeněk Štybar (CZE)	Belgium	Geraardsbergen
18 August	Eneco Tour, Overall	UCI World Tour	Zdeněk Štybar (CZE)	(Note: Race held in Belgium and the Netherlands.)	
18 August	Eneco Tour, Teams classification	UCI World Tour	(Note: The riders on the squad were Gert Steegmans, Sylvain Chavanel, Kevin De Weert, Stijn Vandenbergh, Alessandro Petacchi, Zdeněk Štybar, Niki Terpstra and Guillaume Van Keirsbulck)		
30 August	Vuelta a España, Stage 7	UCI World Tour	Zdeněk Štybar (CZE)	Spain	Mairena del Aljarafe
31 August	World Ports Classic, Overall	UCI Europe Tour	Nikolas Maes (BEL)		
31 August	World Ports Classic, Points classification	UCI Europe Tour	Nikolas Maes (BEL)		
18 September	Tour of Britain, Stage 4	UCI Europe Tour	Mark Cavendish (GBR)	Great Britain	Llanberis
21 September	Tour of Britain, Stage 7	UCI Europe Tour	Mark Cavendish (GBR)	Great Britain	Guildford
22 September	Tour of Britain, Stage 8	UCI Europe Tour	Mark Cavendish (GBR)	Great Britain	London
22 September	UCI Road World Championships, Team time trial	UCI World Tour	(Note: The riders on the squad were Sylvain Chavanel, Michał Kwiatkowski, Tony Martin, Niki Terpstra, Kristof Vandewalle and Peter Velits)	Italy	Florence
20 October	Chrono des Nations	UCI Europe Tour	Tony Martin (GER)	France	Les Herbiers
