= 2013 UCI World Tour =

Road cycling competitions

- Third edition of the UCI World Tour

Details
- Dates: 22 January – 15 October
- Location: Europe, Canada, Australia and China
- Races: 29

Champions
- Individual champion: Joaquim Rodríguez (Team Katusha)
- Teams' champion: Movistar Team
- Nations' champion: Spain

The 2013 UCI World Tour is the fifth edition of the ranking system launched by the Union Cycliste Internationale (UCI) in 2009. The series started with the Tour Down Under on 22 January.

== Teams ==
The UCI ProTeams compete in the World Tour, with UCI Professional Continental teams, or national squads, able to enter at the discretion of the organisers of each event.

2013 UCI Pro Teams and equipment
Code	Official team name	License holder	Country	Groupset	Bicycles
ALM	Ag2r–La Mondiale (2013 season)	EUSRL France Cyclisme	France	SRAM	Focus
ARG	Argos–Shimano (2013 season)	SMS Cycling	Netherlands	Shimano	Felt
AST	Astana (2013 season)	Olympus Sarl	Kazakhstan	Campagnolo	Specialized
BMC	BMC Racing Team (2013 season)	Continuum Sports LLC	United States	Shimano	BMC
EUS	Euskaltel–Euskadi (2013 season)	Fundación Ciclista Euskadi	Spain	Shimano	Orbea
FDJ	FDJ.fr (2013 season)	Société de Gestion de L'Echappée	France	Shimano	Lapierre
GRM	Garmin–Sharp (2013 season)	Slipstream Sports, LLC	United States	Shimano	Cervélo
OGE	Orica–GreenEDGE (2013 season)	Lachlan Smith	Australia	Shimano	Scott
LAM	Lampre–Merida (2013 season)	Total Cycling Limited	Italy	Shimano	Merida
CAN	Cannondale (2013 season)	Brixia Sports	Italy	SRAM	Cannondale
LTB	Lotto–Belisol (2013 season)	Belgian Cycling Company sa	Belgium	Campagnolo	Ridley
MOV	Movistar Team (2013 season)	Abarca Sports S.L.	Spain	Campagnolo	Pinarello
OPQ	Omega Pharma–Quick-Step (2013 season)	Esperanza bvba	Belgium	SRAM	Specialized
BEL	Belkin Pro Cycling (2013 season)	Rabo Wielerploegen	Netherlands	Shimano	Giant
KAT	Team Katusha (2013 season)	Katusha Management SA	Russia	Shimano	Canyon
RLT	RadioShack–Leopard (2013 season)	Trek Bicycle Corporation (Note: Trek announced that it bought the license of RadioShack Leopard on 26 June 2013.)	Luxembourg	Shimano	Trek
SAX	Saxo–Tinkoff (2013 season)	Riis Cycling A/S	Denmark	SRAM	Specialized
SKY	Team Sky (2013 season)	Tour Racing Limited	United Kingdom	Shimano	Pinarello
VCD	Vacansoleil–DCM (2013 season)	STL–Pro Cycling B.V.	Netherlands	Shimano	Bianchi

== Events ==
All events from the 2012 UCI World Tour are included. For the second successive year, the Tour of Hangzhou was scheduled originally as part of the tour, but later withdrawn.

Race	Date	Winner		Second		Third		Other points (4th place onwards)	Stage points
(Australia) Tour Down Under	January 22 – 27	Tom-Jelte Slagter (NED)	100 pts	Javier Moreno (ESP)	80 pts	Geraint Thomas (GBR)	70 pts	60, 50, 40, 30, 20, 10, 4	6, 4, 2, 1, 1
(France) Paris–Nice	March 3 – 10	Richie Porte (AUS)	100 pts	Andrew Talansky (USA)	80 pts	Jean-Christophe Péraud (FRA)	70 pts	60, 50, 40, 30, 20, 10, 4	6, 4, 2, 1, 1
(Italy) Tirreno–Adriatico	March 6 – 12	Vincenzo Nibali (ITA)	100 pts	Chris Froome (GBR)	80 pts	Alberto Contador (ESP)	70 pts	60, 50, 40, 30, 20, 10, 4	6, 4, 2, 1, 1
(Italy) Milan–San Remo	March 17	Gerald Ciolek (GER)	0 pts (Note: As Ciolek rides for MTN–Qhubeka, which is not a World Tour team, he was ineligible to score points towards the UCI World Tour standings.)	Peter Sagan (SVK)	80 pts	Fabian Cancellara (SUI)	70 pts	60, 50, 40, 30, 20, 10, 4	N/A
(Spain) Volta a Catalunya	March 18 – 24	Dan Martin (IRL)	100 pts	Joaquim Rodríguez (ESP)	80 pts	Michele Scarponi (ITA)	70 pts	60, 50, 40, 30, 20, 10, 4	6, 4, 2, 1, 1
(Belgium) E3 Harelbeke	March 22	Fabian Cancellara (SUI)	80 pts	Peter Sagan (SVK)	60 pts	Daniel Oss (ITA)	50 pts	40, 30, 22, 14, 10, 6, 2	N/A
(Belgium) Gent–Wevelgem	March 24	Peter Sagan (SVK)	80 pts	Borut Božič (SLO)	60 pts	Greg Van Avermaet (BEL)	50 pts	40, 30, 22, 14, 10, 6, 2	N/A
(Belgium) Tour of Flanders	March 31	Fabian Cancellara (SUI)	100 pts	Peter Sagan (SVK)	80 pts	Jürgen Roelandts (BEL)	70 pts	60, 50, 40, 30, 20, 10, 4	N/A
(Spain) Tour of the Basque Country	April 1 – 6	Nairo Quintana (COL)	100 pts	Richie Porte (AUS)	80 pts	Sergio Henao (COL)	70 pts	60, 50, 40, 30, 20, 10, 4	6, 4, 2, 1, 1
(France) Paris–Roubaix	April 7	Fabian Cancellara (SUI)	100 pts	Sep Vanmarcke (BEL)	80 pts	Niki Terpstra (NED)	70 pts	60, 50, 40, 30, 20, 10, 4	N/A
(Netherlands) Amstel Gold Race	April 14	Roman Kreuziger (CZE)	80 pts	Alejandro Valverde (ESP)	60 pts	Simon Gerrans (AUS)	50 pts	40, 30, 22, 14, 10, 6, 2	N/A
(Belgium) La Flèche Wallonne	April 17	Daniel Moreno (ESP)	80 pts	Sergio Henao (COL)	60 pts	Carlos Betancur (COL)	50 pts	40, 30, 22, 14, 10, 6, 2	N/A
(Belgium) Liège–Bastogne–Liège	April 21	Dan Martin (IRL)	100 pts	Joaquim Rodríguez (ESP)	80 pts	Alejandro Valverde (ESP)	70 pts	60, 50, 40, 30, 20, 10, 4	N/A
(Switzerland) Tour de Romandie	April 23 – 28	Chris Froome (GBR)	100 pts	Simon Špilak (SLO)	80 pts	Rui Costa (POR)	70 pts	60, 50, 40, 30, 20, 10, 4	6, 4, 2, 1, 1
(Italy) Giro d'Italia	May 4 – 26	Vincenzo Nibali (ITA)	170 pts	Rigoberto Urán (COL)	130 pts	Cadel Evans (AUS)	100 pts	90, 80, 70, 60, 52, 44, 38, 32, 26, 22, 18, 14, 10, 8, 6, 4, 2	16, 8, 4, 2, 1
(France) Critérium du Dauphiné	June 2 – 9	Chris Froome (GBR)	100 pts	Richie Porte (AUS)	80 pts	Daniel Moreno (ESP)	70 pts	60, 50, 40, 30, 20, 10, 4	6, 4, 2, 1, 1
(Switzerland) Tour de Suisse	June 8 – 16	Rui Costa (POR)	100 pts	Bauke Mollema (NED)	80 pts	Roman Kreuziger (CZE)	70 pts	60, 50, 40, 30, 20, 10, 4	6, 4, 2, 1, 1
Tour de France	June 29 – July 21	Chris Froome (GBR)	200 pts	Nairo Quintana (COL)	150 pts	Joaquim Rodríguez (ESP)	120 pts	110, 100, 90, 80, 70, 60, 50, 40, 30, 24, 20, 16, 12, 10, 8, 6, 4	20, 10, 6, 4, 2
(Spain) Clásica de San Sebastián	July 27	Tony Gallopin (FRA)	80 pts	Alejandro Valverde (ESP)	60 pts	Roman Kreuziger (CZE)	50 pts	40, 30, 22, 14, 10, 6, 2	N/A
(Poland) Tour de Pologne	July 27 – August 3	Pieter Weening (NED)	100 pts	Jon Izagirre (ESP)	80 pts	Christophe Riblon (FRA)	70 pts	60, 50, 40, 30, 20, 10, 4	6, 4, 2, 1, 1
(Belgium) (Netherlands) Eneco Tour	August 12 – 18	Zdeněk Štybar (CZE)	100 pts	Tom Dumoulin (NED)	80 pts	Andriy Hryvko (UKR)	70 pts	60, 50, 40, 30, 20, 10, 4	6, 4, 2, 1, 1
(Spain) Vuelta a España	August 24 – September 15	Chris Horner (USA)	170 pts	Vincenzo Nibali (ITA)	130 pts	Alejandro Valverde (ESP)	100 pts	90, 80, 70, 60, 52, 44, 38, 32, 26, 22, 18, 14, 10, 8, 6, 4, 2	16, 8, 4, 2, 1
(Germany) Vattenfall Cyclassics	August 25	John Degenkolb (GER)	80 pts	André Greipel (GER)	60 pts	Alexander Kristoff (NOR)	50 pts	40, 30, 22, 14, 10, 6, 2	N/A
GP Ouest-France	September 1	Filippo Pozzato (ITA)	80 pts	Giacomo Nizzolo (ITA)	60 pts	Samuel Dumoulin (FRA)	50 pts	40, 30, 22, 14, 10, 6, 2	N/A
(Canada) GP de Québec	September 13	Robert Gesink (NED)	80 pts	Arthur Vichot (FRA)	60 pts	Greg Van Avermaet (BEL)	50 pts	40, 30, 22, 14, 10, 6, 2	N/A
(Canada) GP de Montréal	September 15	Peter Sagan (SVK)	80 pts	Simone Ponzi (ITA)	60 pts	Ryder Hesjedal (CAN)	50 pts	40, 30, 22, 14, 10, 6, 2	N/A
(Italy) Team time trial at the World Championships (Note: The World Team Time Trial Championship gives points only in the team rankings, not in the individual or national standings.)	September 22	Omega Pharma–Quick-Step	200 pts	Orica–GreenEDGE	170 pts	Team Sky	140 pts	130, 120, 110, 100, 90, 80, 70	N/A
(Italy) Giro di Lombardia	October 6	Joaquim Rodríguez (ESP)	100 pts	Alejandro Valverde (ESP)	80 pts	Rafał Majka (POL)	70 pts	60, 50, 40, 30, 20, 10, 4	N/A
(China) Tour of Beijing	October 11 – 15	Beñat Intxausti (ESP)	100 pts	Dan Martin (IRL)	80 pts	David López (ESP)	70 pts	60, 50, 40, 30, 20, 10, 4	6, 4, 2, 1, 1

== Final standings ==
=== Individual ===
Riders tied with the same number of points were classified by number of victories, then number of second places, third places, and so on, in World Tour events and stages.

Rank	Name	Team	Points
1	Joaquim Rodríguez (ESP)	Team Katusha	607
2	Chris Froome (GBR)	Team Sky	587
3	Alejandro Valverde (ESP)	Movistar Team	540
4	Peter Sagan (SVK)	Cannondale	491
5	Vincenzo Nibali (ITA)	Astana	474
6	Dan Martin (IRL)	Garmin–Sharp	432
7	Fabian Cancellara (SUI)	RadioShack–Leopard	384
8	Nairo Quintana (COL)	Movistar Team	366
9	Rui Costa (POR)	Movistar Team	352
10	Richie Porte (AUS)	Team Sky	327
11	Roman Kreuziger (CZE)	Saxo–Tinkoff	308
12	Daniel Moreno (ESP)	Team Katusha	295
13	Chris Horner (USA)	RadioShack–Leopard	257
14	Carlos Betancur (COL)	Ag2r–La Mondiale	255
15	Alberto Contador (ESP)	Saxo–Tinkoff	252
16	Michele Scarponi (ITA)	Lampre–Merida	235
17	Bauke Mollema (NED)	Belkin Pro Cycling	232
18	Greg Van Avermaet (BEL)	BMC Racing Team	230
19	Sergio Henao (COL)	Team Sky	227
20	Rafał Majka (POL)	Saxo–Tinkoff	201
21	Simon Špilak (SLO)	Team Katusha	199
22	Beñat Intxausti (ESP)	Movistar Team	196
23	Michał Kwiatkowski (POL)	Omega Pharma–Quick-Step	194
24	Sylvain Chavanel (FRA)	Omega Pharma–Quick-Step	188
25	Pieter Weening (NED)	Orica–GreenEDGE	172

- 228 riders scored points. 30 other riders finished in positions that would have earned them points, but they were ineligible as members of non-ProTour teams.

=== Team ===
Team rankings are calculated by adding the ranking points of the top five riders of a team in the table, plus points gained in the World Team Time Trial Championship (WTTT).

Rank	Team	Points	Top 5 riders	WTTT
1	Movistar Team	1610	Valverde (540), Quintana (366), Costa (352), Intxausti (196), J. Moreno (86)	70
2	Team Sky	1561	Froome (587), Porte (327), Henao (227), Urán (163), Thomas (117)	140
3	Team Katusha	1340	Rodríguez (607), D. Moreno (295), Špilak (199), Kristoff (161), Paolini (78)	0
4	RadioShack–Leopard	1056	Cancellara (384), Horner (257), Bakelants (127), Nizzolo (85), Gallopin (83)	120
5	Astana	1045	Nibali (474), Fuglsang (160), Kangert (116), Gasparotto (115), Hryvko (70)	110
6	Saxo–Tinkoff	1030	Kreuziger (308), Contador (252), Majka (201), Roche (136), Rogers (53)	80
7	Omega Pharma–Quick-Step	1013	Kwiatkowski (194), Chavanel (188), Štybar (172), Cavendish (161), Terpstra (98)	200
8	Garmin–Sharp	855	D. Martin (432), Talansky (154), Hesjedal (75), Danielson (64), Wegmann (40)	90
9	Cannondale	750	P. Sagan (491), Viviani (80), Basso (34), Ratto (25), Moser (20)	100
10	BMC Racing Team	731	Van Avermaet (230), Evans (111), van Garderen (104), Gilbert (98), Oss (58)	130
11	Belkin Pro Cycling	714	Mollema (232), Gesink (145), Kelderman (130), Slagter (127), Vanmarcke (80)	0
12	Ag2r–La Mondiale	691	Betancur (255), Pozzovivo (146), Péraud (112), Riblon (111), Bardet (67)	0
13	Orica–GreenEDGE	600	Weening (172), Gerrans (92), Langeveld (65), Impey (56), Matthews (45)	170
14	Lampre–Merida	543	Scarponi (235), Niemiec (118), Pozzato (112), Ulissi (48), Richeze (30)	0
15	Euskaltel–Euskadi	391	J. Izagirre (147), S. Sánchez (114), Nieve (76), G. Izagirre (32), Landa (22)	0
16	Argos–Shimano	355	Degenkolb (119), Kittel (92), T. Dumoulin (85), Barguil (32), Mezgec (27)	0
17	FDJ.fr	338	Pinot (146), Ladagnous (76), Vichot (60), Bouhanni (36), Démare (20)	0
18	Lotto–Belisol	307	Greipel (135), Roelandts (110), Van Den Broeck (41), Hansen (20), Wellens (1)	0
19	Vacansoleil–DCM	125	Flecha (52), Westra (23), B. van Poppel (22), Leukemans (14), Poels (14)	0

=== Nation ===
National rankings were calculated by adding the ranking points of the top five riders registered in a nation in the table. The national rankings were also used to determine how many riders a country could have in the World Championships.

Rank	Nation	Points	Top five riders
1	Spain	1890	Rodríguez (607), Valverde (540), D. Moreno (295), Contador (252), Intxausti (196)
2	Italy	1082	Nibali (474), Scarponi (235), Pozzovivo (146), Gasparotto (115), Pozzato (112)
3	Colombia	1011	Quintana (366), Betancur (255), Henao (227), Urán (163)
4	Great Britain	975	Froome (587), Cavendish (161), Thomas (117), Wiggins (66), Stannard (44)
5	Netherlands	806	Mollema (232), Weening (172), Gesink (145), Kelderman (130), Slagter (127)
6	Belgium	645	Van Avermaet (230), Bakelants (127), Roelandts (110), Gilbert (98), Vanmarcke (80)
7	France	640	Chavanel (188), Pinot (146), Péraud (112), Riblon (111), Gallopin (83)
8	Australia	628	Porte (327), Evans (111), Gerrans (92), Rogers (53), Matthews (45)
9	United States	617	Horner (257), Talansky (154), van Garderen (104), Danielson (64), Phinney (38)
10	Ireland	568	D. Martin (432), Roche (136)
11	Poland	515	Majka (201), Kwiatkowski (194), Niemiec (118), Paterski (2)
12	Slovakia	501	P. Sagan (491), P. Velits (10)
13	Czech Republic	480	Kreuziger (308), Štybar (172)
14	Germany	478	Greipel (135), Degenkolb (119), T. Martin (92), Kittel (92), Wegmann (40)
15	Switzerland	467	Cancellara (384), Frank (55), Albasini (19), Rast (6), Wyss (3)

- Riders from 35 countries scored points.

== Leader progress ==
Event (Winner)	Individual	Team	Nation
Tour Down Under (Tom-Jelte Slagter)	Tom-Jelte Slagter	Blanco Pro Cycling	Spain
Paris–Nice (Richie Porte)	Richie Porte	Team Sky	Spain
Tirreno–Adriatico (Vincenzo Nibali)	Richie Porte	Team Sky	Spain
Milan–San Remo (Gerald Ciolek)	Sylvain Chavanel	Team Sky	Spain
E3 Harelbeke (Fabian Cancellara)	Peter Sagan	Team Sky	Spain
Volta a Catalunya (Dan Martin)	Peter Sagan	Team Sky	Spain
Gent–Wevelgem (Peter Sagan)	Peter Sagan	Team Sky	Spain
Tour of Flanders (Fabian Cancellara)	Peter Sagan	Team Sky	Spain
Tour of the Basque Country (Nairo Quintana)	Peter Sagan	Team Sky	Spain
Paris–Roubaix (Fabian Cancellara)	Fabian Cancellara	Team Sky	Spain
Amstel Gold Race (Roman Kreuziger)	Fabian Cancellara	Team Sky	Spain
Flèche Wallonne (Daniel Moreno)	Fabian Cancellara	Team Sky	Spain
Liège–Bastogne–Liège (Dan Martin)	Fabian Cancellara	Team Sky	Spain
Tour de Romandie (Chris Froome)	Fabian Cancellara	Team Sky	Spain
Giro d'Italia (Vincenzo Nibali)	Fabian Cancellara	Team Sky	Colombia
Critérium du Dauphiné (Chris Froome)	Fabian Cancellara	Team Sky	Spain
Tour de Suisse (Rui Costa)	Fabian Cancellara	Team Sky	Spain
Tour de France (Chris Froome)	Chris Froome	Team Sky	Spain
Clásica de San Sebastián (Tony Gallopin)	Chris Froome	Team Sky	Spain
Tour de Pologne (Pieter Weening)	Chris Froome	Team Sky	Spain
Eneco Tour (Zdeněk Štybar)	Chris Froome	Team Sky	Spain
Vattenfall Cyclassics (John Degenkolb)	Chris Froome	Team Sky	Spain
GP Ouest-France (Filippo Pozzato)	Chris Froome	Team Sky	Spain
GP de Québec (Robert Gesink)	Chris Froome	Team Sky	Spain
Vuelta a España (Chris Horner)	Chris Froome	Team Sky	Spain
GP de Montréal (Peter Sagan)	Chris Froome	Team Sky	Spain
World TTT Championships (Omega Pharma–Quick-Step)	Chris Froome	Team Sky	Spain
Giro di Lombardia (Joaquim Rodríguez)	Joaquim Rodríguez	Team Sky	Spain
Tour of Beijing (Beñat Intxausti)	Joaquim Rodríguez	Movistar Team	Spain
