= 2013 Gent–Wevelgem =

2013 UCI World Tour, race 7 of 28

Race details
- Dates: March 24, 2013
- Stages: 1
- Distance: 183.4 km (114.0 mi)
- Winning time: 4h 29' 10"

Results
	Winner	Peter Sagan (SVK)	(Cannondale)
	Second	Borut Božič (SLO)	(Astana)
	Third	Greg Van Avermaet (BEL)	(BMC Racing Team)

The 2013 Gent–Wevelgem was the 75th running of the Gent–Wevelgem single-day Belgian cycling race. It was held on 24 March 2013 over a distance of 183.4 kilometres (114.0 miles) ending in Wevelgem, and was the seventh race of the 2013 UCI World Tour season. The race was originally scheduled to be over a distance of 238 kilometres (147.9 miles), but due to snow, the race start was moved from Deinze to Gistel. The winner was Peter Sagan.

The race was won by Slovakia's Peter Sagan of the Cannondale team, after making a solo attack with 4 km (2.5 mi) remaining, and ultimately held on to win the race by 23 seconds ahead of a group of nine riders. Second place went to Slovenian Borut Božič, riding for the Astana team, while Greg Van Avermaet was the highest-finishing Belgian rider, completing the podium for the BMC Racing Team.

== Teams ==
As Gent–Wevelgem was a UCI World Tour event, all UCI ProTeams were invited automatically and obligated to send a squad. Originally, eighteen ProTeams were invited to the race, with six other squads given wildcard places, and as such, would have formed the event's 24-team peloton. Team Katusha subsequently regained their ProTour status after an appeal to the Court of Arbitration for Sport. With Team Katusha not originally invited to the race, race organisers announced their inclusion to the race, bringing the total number of teams competing to twenty-five. Each of the 25 teams were allowed to enter eight riders to the race, making up a maximum starting peloton of 200 riders.

The 25 teams that competed in the race were:

- Accent Jobs–Wanty
- Ag2r–La Mondiale
- Argos–Shimano
- Astana
- Blanco Pro Cycling
- BMC Racing Team
- Cannondale
- Cofidis
- Crelan–Euphony
- Team Europcar
- Euskaltel–Euskadi
- FDJ
- Garmin–Sharp
- IAM Cycling
- Team Katusha
- Lampre–Merida
- Lotto–Belisol
- Movistar Team
- Omega Pharma–Quick-Step
- Orica–GreenEDGE
- RadioShack–Leopard
- Saxo–Tinkoff
- Team Sky
- Topsport Vlaanderen–Baloise
- Vacansoleil–DCM

== Results ==
	Cyclist	Team	Time
1	Peter Sagan (SVK)	Cannondale	4h 29' 10"
2	Borut Božič (SLO)	Astana	+ 23"
3	Greg Van Avermaet (BEL)	BMC Racing Team	+ 23"
4	Heinrich Haussler (AUS)	IAM Cycling	+ 23"
5	Juan Antonio Flecha (ESP)	Vacansoleil–DCM	+ 23"
6	Mathieu Ladagnous (FRA)	FDJ	+ 23"
7	Bernhard Eisel (AUT)	Team Sky	+ 23"
8	Stijn Vandenbergh (BEL)	Omega Pharma–Quick-Step	+ 24"
9	Yaroslav Popovych (UKR)	RadioShack–Leopard	+ 24"
10	Andrey Amador (CRC)	Movistar Team	+ 24"
