= 2009 Vuelta a Andalucía =

Race details
- Dates: 15–19 February 2009
- Stages: 4 + Prologue
- Distance: 669 km (415.7 mi)
- Winning time: 17h 28' 40"

Results
	Winner	Joost Posthuma (NED)
	Second	Xavier Tondo (ESP)
	Third	Davide Rebellin (ITA)

The 2009 Vuelta a Andalucía was the 55th edition of the Vuelta a Andalucía cycle race and was held on 15 February to 19 February 2009. The race started in Jaén and finished in Antequera. The race was won by Joost Posthuma.

== Teams ==
Thirteen teams of seven riders started the race:

- Caisse d'Epargne
- Silence–Lotto
- Rabobank
- Skil–Shimano
- Diquigiovanni–Androni
- Vacansoleil
- Team Katusha
- Team Milram
- Euskaltel–Euskadi
- Andalucía–Cajasur
- Fuji–Servetto
- Xacobeo–Galicia
- Contentpolis–Ampo

== General classification ==
Final general classification

Rank	Rider	Time
1	Joost Posthuma (NED)	17h 28' 40"
2	Xavier Tondo (ESP)	+ 2"
3	Davide Rebellin (ITA)	+ 3"
4	Martin Velits (SVK)	+ 5"
5	Michele Scarponi (ITA)	+ 18"
6	Juan José Oroz (ESP)	+ 21"
7	David López (ESP)	s.t.
8	Beñat Intxausti (ESP)	+ 23"
9	Juan Antonio Flecha (ESP)	+ 34"
10	Gilberto Simoni (ITA)	+ 51"
