= 2013 Liège–Bastogne–Liège =

2013 UCI World Tour, race 13 of 28

Race details
- Dates: 21 April 2013
- Stages: 1
- Distance: 261.5 km (162.5 mi)
- Winning time: 6h 38' 07"

Results
	Winner	Dan Martin (IRE)	(Garmin–Sharp)
	Second	Joaquim Rodríguez (ESP)	(Team Katusha)
	Third	Alejandro Valverde (ESP)	(Movistar Team)

The 2013 Liège–Bastogne–Liège was the 99th running of Liège–Bastogne–Liège, a single-day cycling race. It was held on 21 April 2013 over a distance of 261.5 kilometres (162.5 miles) and it was the thirteenth race of the 2013 UCI World Tour season. The race was won by Dan Martin of Garmin–Sharp after he placed a late attack out of a group led by his teammate Ryder Hesjedal, to catch and eventually distance Joaquim Rodríguez who had to settle for second, while Alejandro Valverde won the sprint for third place.

== Teams ==
As Liège–Bastogne–Liège is a UCI World Tour event, all 19 UCI ProTeams were automatically invited and obligated to send a squad. Six other squads were given wildcard places into the race, and as such, formed the event's 25-team peloton.

The 19 UCI ProTeams that competed in the race:

- Ag2r–La Mondiale
- Argos–Shimano
- Astana
- Blanco Pro Cycling
- BMC Racing Team
- Cannondale
- Euskaltel–Euskadi
- FDJ
- Garmin–Sharp
- Orica–GreenEDGE
- Team Katusha
- Lampre–Merida
- Lotto–Belisol
- Movistar Team
- Omega Pharma–Quick-Step
- RadioShack–Leopard
- Saxo–Tinkoff
- Team Sky
- Vacansoleil–DCM

The 6 teams who were given wild cards:

- Accent Jobs–Wanty
- Cofidis
- Crelan–Euphony
- IAM Cycling
- Team Europcar
- Topsport Vlaanderen–Baloise

== Results ==
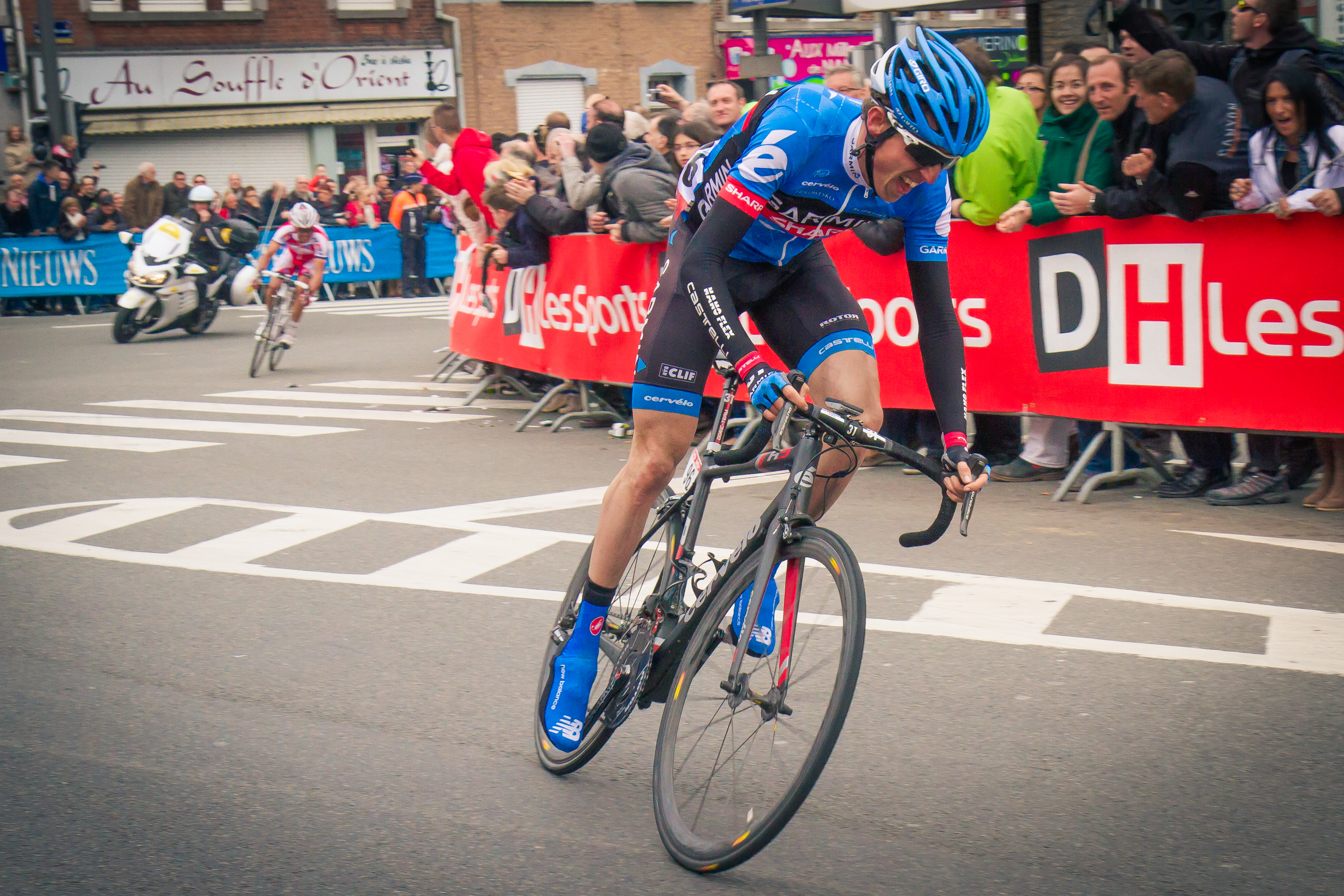
Dan Martin exiting the final turn on his way to victory

	Cyclist	Team	Time	UCI World Tour Points
1	Dan Martin (IRL)	Garmin–Sharp	6h 38' 07"	100
2	Joaquim Rodríguez (ESP)	Team Katusha	+ 3"	80
3	Alejandro Valverde (ESP)	Movistar Team	+ 9"	70
4	Carlos Betancur (COL)	Ag2r–La Mondiale	+ 9"	60
5	Michele Scarponi (ITA)	Lampre–Merida	+ 9"	50
6	Enrico Gasparotto (ITA)	Astana	+ 18"	40
7	Philippe Gilbert (BEL)	BMC Racing Team	+ 18"	30
8	Ryder Hesjedal (CAN)	Garmin–Sharp	+ 18"	20
9	Rui Costa (POR)	Movistar Team	+ 18"	10
10	Simon Gerrans (AUS)	Orica–GreenEDGE	+ 18"	4
