= 2013 Clásica de San Sebastián =

2013 UCI World Tour, race 19 of 28

Race details
- Dates: 27 July 2013
- Stages: 1
- Distance: 232 km (144 mi)
- Winning time: 5h 39' 02"

Results
	Winner	Tony Gallopin (France)	(RadioShack–Leopard)
	Second	Alejandro Valverde (Spain)	(Movistar Team)
	Third	Roman Kreuziger (Czech Republic)	(Saxo–Tinkoff)

The 2013 Clásica de San Sebastián was the 33rd edition of the Clásica de San Sebastián, a single-day cycling race. It was held on 27 July 2013, over a distance of 232 km (144.2 mi), starting and finishing in San Sebastián, in the Basque Country, Spain. It was the nineteenth event of the 2013 UCI World Tour season.

The race was won by RadioShack–Leopard's Tony Gallopin, after he made a solo attack on the race's final climb – the Alto de Arkale – and was able to hold off the remainder of the field, to take the biggest win of his career. Second place went to Movistar Team's Alejandro Valverde, 28 seconds behind Gallopin, while the podium was completed by Saxo–Tinkoff rider Roman Kreuziger.

== Teams ==
As the Clásica de San Sebastián was a UCI World Tour event, all 19 UCI ProTeams were invited automatically and obligated to send a squad. Caja Rural–Seguros RGA were given a wildcard place to form a 20-team peloton.

The 20 teams that competed in the race were:

- Ag2r–La Mondiale
- Argos–Shimano
- Astana
- Belkin Pro Cycling
- BMC Racing Team
- Caja Rural–Seguros RGA
- Cannondale
- Euskaltel–Euskadi
- FDJ.fr
- Garmin–Sharp
- Lampre–Merida
- Lotto–Belisol
- Movistar Team
- Omega Pharma–Quick-Step
- Orica–GreenEDGE
- RadioShack–Leopard
- Team Katusha
- Saxo–Tinkoff
- Team Sky
- Vacansoleil–DCM

== Results ==
	Cyclist	Team	Time	UCI World Tour Points
1	Tony Gallopin (FRA)	RadioShack–Leopard	5h 39' 02"	80
2	Alejandro Valverde (ESP)	Movistar Team	+ 20"	60
3	Roman Kreuziger (CZE)	Saxo–Tinkoff	+ 20"	50
4	Mikel Nieve (ESP)	Euskaltel–Euskadi	+ 20"	40
5	Nicolas Roche (IRL)	Saxo–Tinkoff	+ 29"	30
6	Mikel Landa (ESP)	Euskaltel–Euskadi	+ 36"	22
7	Moreno Moser (ITA)	Cannondale	+ 51"	14
8	Pieter Serry (BEL)	Omega Pharma–Quick-Step	+ 51"	10
9	Bauke Mollema (NED)	Belkin Pro Cycling	+ 51"	6
10	Arnold Jeannesson (FRA)	FDJ.fr	+ 51"	2
