= 2013 E3 Harelbeke =

2013 UCI World Tour, race 6 of 28

Race details
- Dates: 22 March 2013
- Stages: 1
- Distance: 211 km (131 mi)
- Winning time: 5h 08' 28"

Results
	Winner	Fabian Cancellara (Switzerland)	(RadioShack–Leopard)
	Second	Peter Sagan (Slovakia)	(Cannondale)
	Third	Daniel Oss (Italy)	(BMC Racing Team)

The 2013 E3 Harelbeke was the 56th running of the E3 Harelbeke single-day cycling race. It was held on 22 March 2013, over a distance of 211 kilometres (131.1 miles) and was the sixth race of the 2013 UCI World Tour season.

The race was won for the third time by RadioShack–Leopard rider Fabian Cancellara, after he made a solo attack with around 35 km (21.7 mi) remaining of the race. Second place went to Peter Sagan of the Cannondale team, while third place went to the BMC Racing Team's Daniel Oss; both of those riders finished 64 seconds behind Cancellara.

== Teams ==
As E3 Harelbeke was a UCI World Tour event, all UCI ProTeams were invited automatically and obligated to send a squad. Originally, eighteen ProTeams were invited to the race, with six other squads given wildcard places, and as such, would have formed the event's 24-team peloton. Team Katusha subsequently regained their ProTour status after an appeal to the Court of Arbitration for Sport. With Team Katusha not originally invited to the race, race organisers announced their inclusion to the race, bringing the total number of teams competing to twenty-five. Each of the 25 teams entered eight riders to the race, making up a starting peloton of 200 riders.

The 25 teams that competed in the race were:

- Accent Jobs–Wanty
- Ag2r–La Mondiale
- Argos–Shimano
- Astana
- Blanco Pro Cycling
- BMC Racing Team
- Cannondale
- Cofidis
- Crelan–Euphony
- Team Europcar
- Euskaltel–Euskadi
- FDJ
- Garmin–Sharp
- IAM Cycling
- Team Katusha
- Lampre–Merida
- Lotto–Belisol
- Movistar Team
- Omega Pharma–Quick-Step
- Orica–GreenEDGE
- RadioShack–Leopard
- Saxo–Tinkoff
- Team Sky
- Topsport Vlaanderen–Baloise
- Vacansoleil–DCM

== Results ==
	Cyclist	Team	Time
1	Fabian Cancellara (SUI)	RadioShack–Leopard	5h 08' 28"
2	Peter Sagan (SVK)	Cannondale	+ 1' 04"
3	Daniel Oss (ITA)	BMC Racing Team	+ 1' 04"
4	Geraint Thomas (GBR)	Team Sky	+ 1' 04"
5	Sebastian Langeveld (NED)	Orica–GreenEDGE	+ 1' 08"
6	Sylvain Chavanel (FRA)	Omega Pharma–Quick-Step	+ 1' 08"
7	Tom Boonen (BEL)	Omega Pharma–Quick-Step	+ 2' 15"
8	Luca Paolini (ITA)	Team Katusha	+ 2' 15"
9	Edvald Boasson Hagen (NOR)	Team Sky	+ 2' 15"
10	Sébastien Turgot (FRA)	Team Europcar	+ 2' 15"
