= Yan Dong Xing =

Chinese bicycle racer

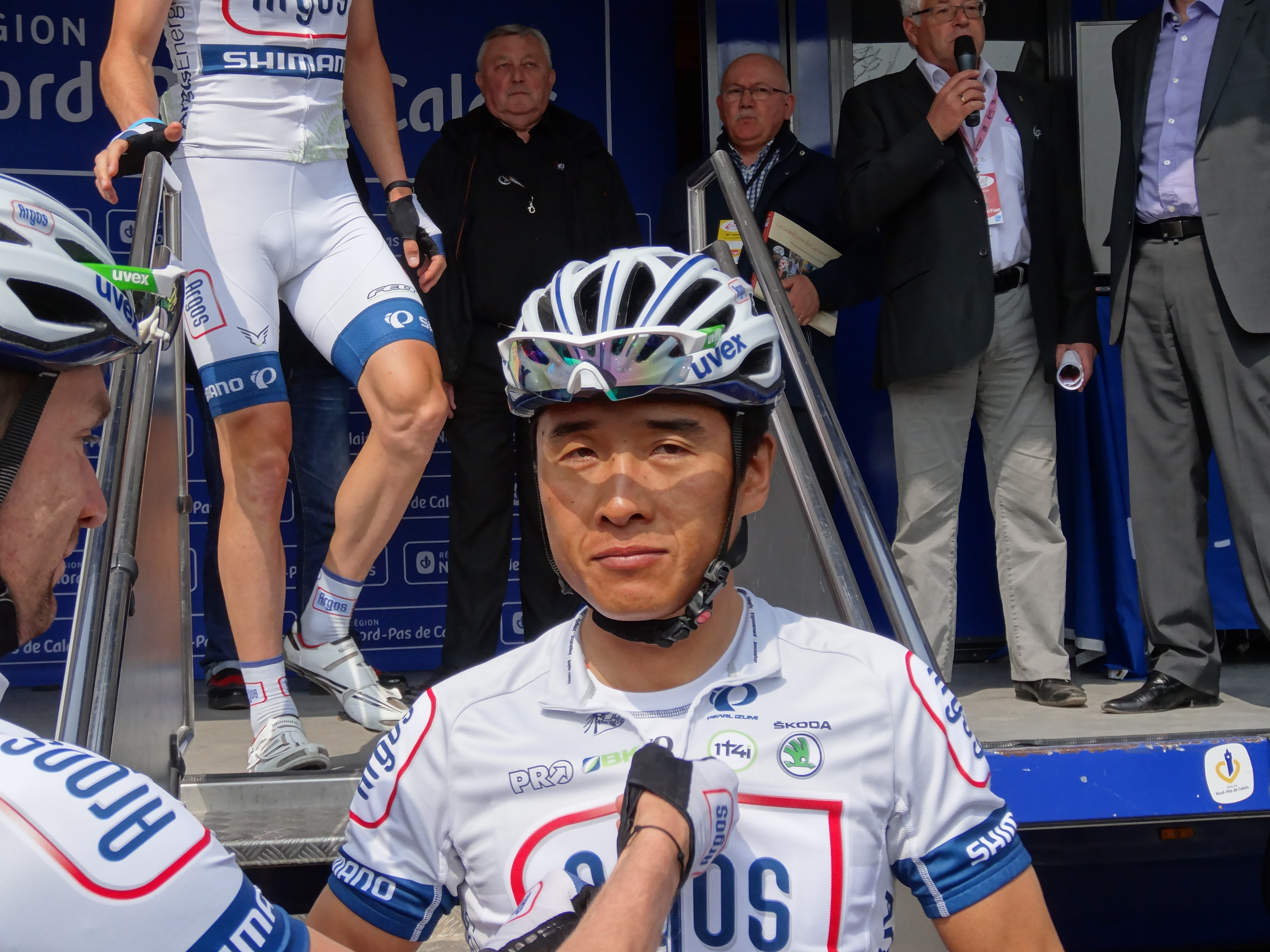
- Yan in 2013

Personal information
- Full name: Yan Dong Xing
- Born: 20 March 1985 (age 41)

Cycling career
- Sport: Cycling
- Current team: Retired
- Discipline: Road
- Role: Rider

Professional teams
- 2006–2009: Marco Polo
- 2010: Holy Brother
- 2011: Marco Polo
- 2012: Max Success Sports
- 2013: Argos–Shimano

Yan Dong Xing (Chinese: 邢彦东; pinyin: Xíng Yàndōng; born 20 March 1985) is a Chinese former racing cyclist.
