= 2013 Tour of Flanders =

2013 UCI World Tour, race 8 of 28
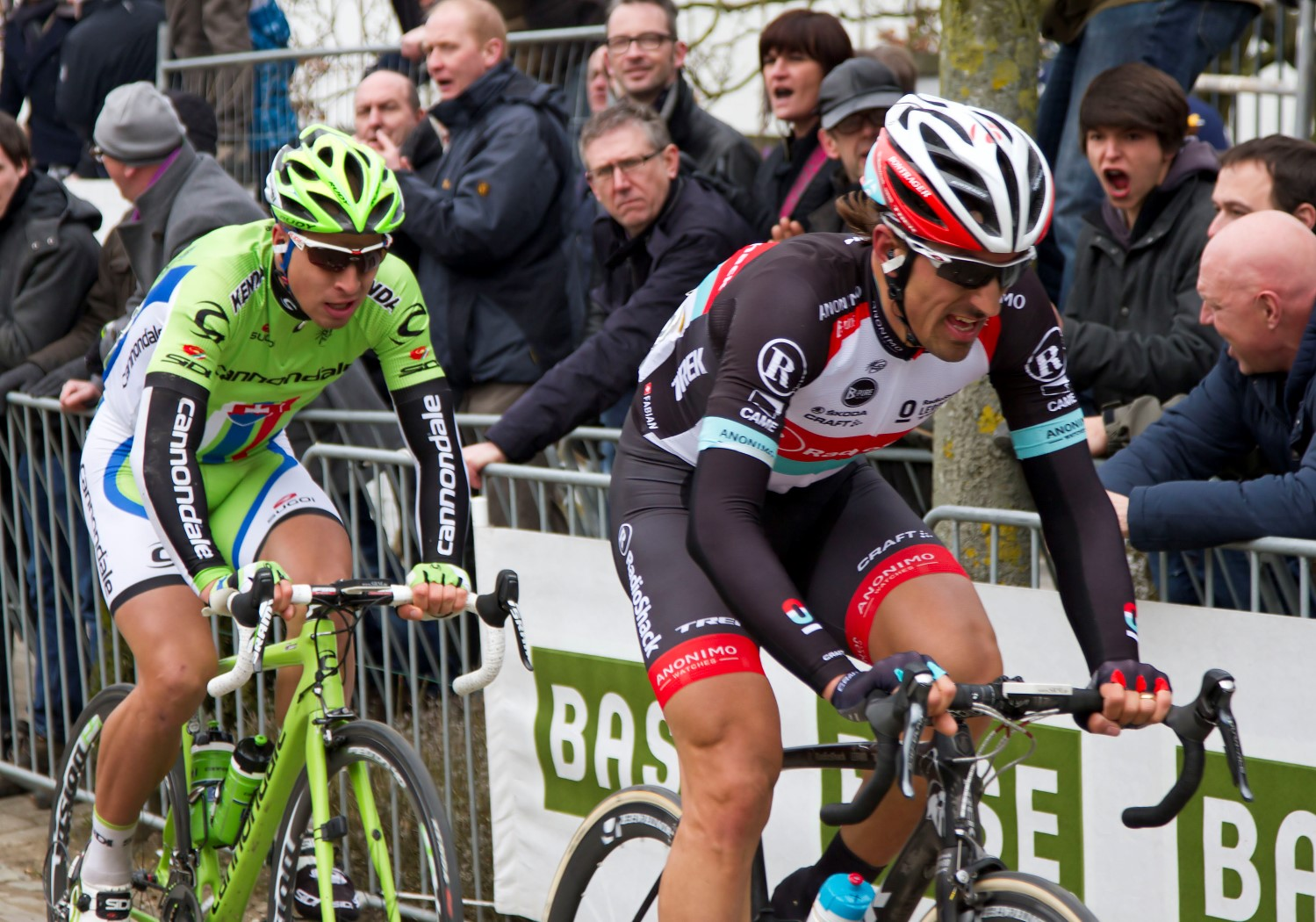
- Peter Sagan following Fabian Cancellara

Race details
- Dates: 31 March 2013
- Stages: 1
- Distance: 256 km (159 mi)
- Winning time: 6h 06' 01"

Results
	Winner	Fabian Cancellara (SUI)	(RadioShack–Leopard)
	Second	Peter Sagan (SVK)	(Cannondale)
	Third	Jürgen Roelandts (BEL)	(Lotto–Belisol)

The 2013 Tour of Flanders was the 97th edition of the Tour of Flanders single-day cycling race, known as one of the Monument classics. It was held on 31 March 2013 over a distance of 256 kilometres (159.1 miles) from Bruges to Oudenaarde, and was the eighth race of the 2013 UCI World Tour season.

The race was won for the second time by RadioShack–Leopard rider Fabian Cancellara, after he made a solo attack with around 15 km (9.3 mi) remaining of the race, on the race's final cobbled climb of the Paterberg. Second place went to Peter Sagan of the Cannondale team, while third place went to Lotto–Belisol's Jürgen Roelandts; both of those riders had been in a group with Cancellara before his move, and eventually finished nearly one-and-a-half minutes behind Cancellara.

== Route ==
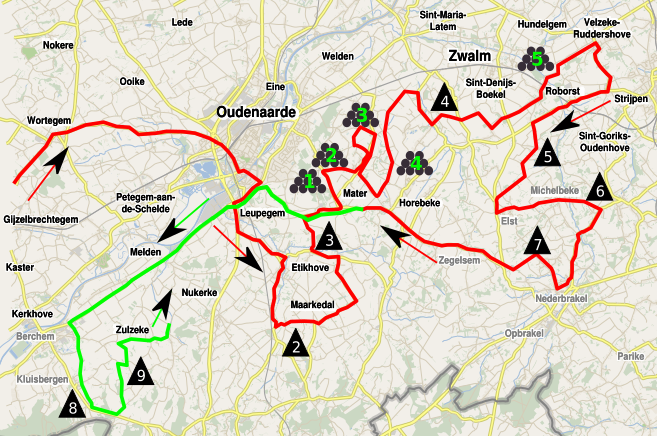
First lap of the circuit (red) and transition to the second lap (green).

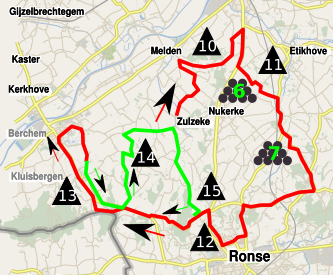
Second lap of the circuit (red) and transition to the third lap (green).

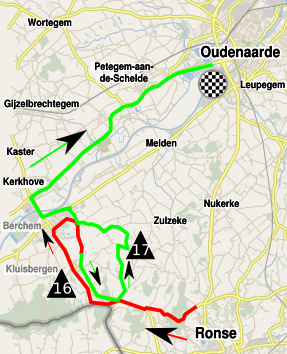
Third lap of the circuit (red) and final (green).

== Teams ==
As the Tour of Flanders was a UCI World Tour event, all UCI ProTeams were invited automatically and obligated to send a squad. Originally, race organisers had been planning to have the eighteen ProTeams invited to the race, with seven other squads given wildcard places, and as such, would have formed the event's 25-team peloton. Team Katusha subsequently regained their ProTour status after an appeal to the Court of Arbitration for Sport. Rather than removing one team from the race to accommodate Team Katusha, race organisers sought approval from the Union Cycliste Internationale to invite 26 teams of 8 riders, and a maximum peloton of 208 riders; this proposal was granted prior to the race.

The 26 teams that competed in the race were:

- Accent Jobs–Wanty
- Ag2r–La Mondiale
- Argos–Shimano
- Astana
- Blanco Pro Cycling
- BMC Racing Team
- Cannondale
- Crelan–Euphony
- Team Europcar
- Euskaltel–Euskadi
- FDJ
- Garmin–Sharp
- IAM Cycling
- Team Katusha
- Lampre–Merida
- Lotto–Belisol
- Movistar Team
- NetApp–Endura
- Omega Pharma–Quick-Step
- Orica–GreenEDGE
- RadioShack–Leopard
- Saxo–Tinkoff
- Team Sky
- Topsport Vlaanderen–Baloise
- Vacansoleil–DCM
- Vini Fantini–Selle Italia

== Results ==
	Cyclist	Team	Time	UCI World Tour Points
1	Fabian Cancellara (SUI)	RadioShack–Leopard	6h 06' 01"	100
2	Peter Sagan (SVK)	Cannondale	+ 1' 27"	80
3	Jürgen Roelandts (BEL)	Lotto–Belisol	+ 1' 29"	70
4	Alexander Kristoff (NOR)	Team Katusha	+ 1' 39"	60
5	Mathieu Ladagnous (FRA)	FDJ	+ 1' 39"	50
6	Heinrich Haussler (AUS)	IAM Cycling	+ 1' 39"	–
7	Greg Van Avermaet (BEL)	BMC Racing Team	+ 1' 39"	30
8	Sébastien Turgot (FRA)	Team Europcar	+ 1' 39"	–
9	John Degenkolb (GER)	Argos–Shimano	+ 1' 39"	10
10	Sebastian Langeveld (NED)	Orica–GreenEDGE	+ 1' 39"	4
