= 2013 Eneco Tour =

2013 UCI World Tour, race 20 of 29

Race details
- Dates: 12–18 August 2013
- Stages: 7
- Distance: 1,080.3 km (671.3 mi)
- Winning time: 25h 14' 05"

Results
| Jersey awarded to the overall winner | Winner | Zdeněk Štybar (Czech Republic) | (Omega Pharma–Quick-Step) |
| | Second | Tom Dumoulin (Netherlands) | (Argos–Shimano) |
| | Third | Andriy Hryvko (Ukraine) | (Astana) |
| Jersey awarded to the points classification winner | Points | Lars Boom (Netherlands) | (Belkin Pro Cycling) |
| Jersey awarded to the sprints classification winner | Sprints | Laurens De Vreese (Belgium) | (Topsport Vlaanderen–Baloise) |
| | Team | Omega Pharma–Quick-Step | |

The 2013 Eneco Tour was the ninth running of the Eneco Tour cycling stage race. It started on 12 August in Koksijde and ended on 18 August in Geraardsbergen, Belgium, after seven stages. It was the 20th race of the 2013 UCI World Tour season and was won by Zdeněk Štybar.

== Teams ==
All 19 teams in the UCI's Proteam category were entitled, and obliged, to enter the race. Two UCI Professional Continental teams were also invited.

- Accent Jobs–Wanty†
- Ag2r–La Mondiale
- BMC Racing Team
- FDJ.fr
- Movistar Team
- Team Sky
- Argos–Shimano
- Cannondale
- Garmin–Sharp
- Omega Pharma–Quick-Step
- Vacansoleil–DCM
- Astana
- Lampre–Merida
- Orica–GreenEDGE
- Team Katusha
- Belkin Pro Cycling
- Euskaltel–Euskadi
- Lotto–Belisol
- RadioShack–Leopard
- Saxo–Tinkoff
- Topsport Vlaanderen–Baloise†

†: Invited Pro-Continental teams

== Schedule ==
The race consists of seven stages, including one individual time trial stage. Just as the previous season, the race will finish with a stage including the Muur van Geraardsbergen, which was famous for its presence in the Tour of Flanders single-day race.

| Stage | Date | Course | Distance | Type | Winner |
|---|---|---|---|---|---|
| 1 | 12 August | Koksijde (Belgium) to Ardooie (Belgium) | 175.3 km (108.9 mi) | Flat stage | Mark Renshaw (AUS) |
| 2 | 13 August | Ardooie (Belgium) to Vorst (Belgium) | 176.9 km (109.9 mi) | Flat stage | Arnaud Démare (FRA) |
| 3 | 14 August | Oosterhout (Netherlands) to Brouwersdam (Netherlands) | 187.3 km (116.4 mi) | Flat stage | Zdeněk Štybar (CZE) |
| 4 | 15 August | Essen (Belgium) to Vlijmen (Netherlands) | 169.6 km (105.4 mi) | Flat stage | André Greipel (GER) |
| 5 | 16 August | Sittard-Geleen (Netherlands) to Sittard-Geleen (Netherlands) | 13.2 km (8.2 mi) | Individual time trial | Sylvain Chavanel (FRA) |
| 6 | 17 August | Riemst (Belgium) to La Redoute (Belgium) | 150 km (93.2 mi) | Intermediate stage | David López (ESP) |
| 7 | 18 August | Tienen (Belgium) to Geraardsbergen (Belgium) | 208 km (129.2 mi) | Intermediate stage | Zdeněk Štybar (CZE) |
| Total | | 1,080.3 km (671.3 mi) | | | |

== Stages ==
=== Stage 1 ===
12 August 2013 — Koksijde (Belgium) to Ardooie (Belgium), 175.3 km (108.9 mi)

Stage 1 Result

| | Rider | Team | Time |
|---|---|---|---|
| 1 | Mark Renshaw (AUS) | Belkin Pro Cycling | 4h 01' 14" |
| 2 | André Greipel (GER) | Lotto–Belisol | + 2" |
| 3 | Giacomo Nizzolo (ITA) | RadioShack–Leopard | + 2" |
| 4 | Maximiliano Richeze (ARG) | Lampre–Merida | + 2" |
| 5 | Elia Viviani (ITA) | Cannondale | + 2" |
| 6 | Taylor Phinney (USA) | BMC Racing Team | + 2" |
| 7 | Michael Van Staeyen (BEL) | Topsport Vlaanderen–Baloise | + 2" |
| 8 | Davide Appollonio (ITA) | Ag2r–La Mondiale | + 2" |
| 9 | Alessandro Petacchi (ITA) | Omega Pharma–Quick-Step | + 2" |
| 10 | Ruslan Tleubayev (KAZ) | Astana | + 2" |

General Classification after Stage 1

| | Rider | Team | Time |
|---|---|---|---|
| 1 | Mark Renshaw (AUS) | Belkin Pro Cycling | 4h 01' 04" |
| 2 | André Greipel (GER) | Lotto–Belisol | + 6" |
| 3 | Pieter Jacobs (BEL) | Topsport Vlaanderen–Baloise | + 7" |
| 4 | Giacomo Nizzolo (ITA) | RadioShack–Leopard | + 8" |
| 5 | Benjamin Verraes (BEL) | Accent Jobs–Wanty | + 8" |
| 6 | Lars Boom (NED) | Belkin Pro Cycling | + 9" |
| 7 | Laurens De Vreese (BEL) | Topsport Vlaanderen–Baloise | + 9" |
| 8 | Taylor Phinney (USA) | BMC Racing Team | + 10" |
| 9 | Maciej Bodnar (POL) | Cannondale | + 11" |
| 10 | Maximiliano Richeze (ARG) | Lampre–Merida | + 12" |

=== Stage 2 ===
13 August 2013 — Ardooie (Belgium) to Vorst (Belgium), 176.9 km (109.9 mi)

Stage 2 Result

| | Rider | Team | Time |
|---|---|---|---|
| 1 | Arnaud Démare (FRA) | FDJ.fr | 4h 03' 34" |
| 2 | Philippe Gilbert (BEL) | BMC Racing Team | s.t. |
| 3 | Tyler Farrar (USA) | Garmin–Sharp | s.t. |
| 4 | Marko Kump (SLO) | Saxo–Tinkoff | s.t. |
| 5 | Alessandro Petacchi (ITA) | Omega Pharma–Quick-Step | s.t. |
| 6 | Jempy Drucker (LUX) | Accent Jobs–Wanty | s.t. |
| 7 | Filippo Pozzato (ITA) | Lampre–Merida | s.t. |
| 8 | Taylor Phinney (USA) | BMC Racing Team | s.t. |
| 9 | Lars Boom (NED) | Belkin Pro Cycling | s.t. |
| 10 | Mathieu Ladagnous (FRA) | FDJ.fr | s.t. |

General Classification after Stage 2

| | Rider | Team | Time |
|---|---|---|---|
| 1 | Arnaud Démare (FRA) | FDJ.fr | 8h 04' 40" |
| 2 | Mark Renshaw (AUS) | Belkin Pro Cycling | + 3" |
| 3 | Philippe Gilbert (BEL) | BMC Racing Team | + 4" |
| 4 | Tyler Farrar (USA) | Garmin–Sharp | + 6" |
| 5 | Lars Boom (NED) | Belkin Pro Cycling | + 7" |
| 6 | Taylor Phinney (USA) | BMC Racing Team | + 8" |
| 7 | André Greipel (GER) | Lotto–Belisol | + 9" |
| 8 | Alessandro Petacchi (ITA) | Omega Pharma–Quick-Step | + 10" |
| 9 | Mathieu Ladagnous (FRA) | FDJ.fr | + 10" |
| 10 | Jempy Drucker (LUX) | Accent Jobs–Wanty | + 10" |

=== Stage 3 ===
14 August 2013 — Oosterhout (Netherlands) to Brouwersdam (Netherlands), 187.3 km (116.4 mi)

Stage 3 Result

| | Rider | Team | Time |
|---|---|---|---|
| 1 | Zdeněk Štybar (CZE) | Omega Pharma–Quick-Step | 4h 14' 00" |
| 2 | Maximiliano Richeze (ARG) | Lampre–Merida | s.t. |
| 3 | Lars Boom (NED) | Belkin Pro Cycling | s.t. |
| 4 | Giacomo Nizzolo (ITA) | RadioShack–Leopard | + 2" |
| 5 | André Greipel (GER) | Lotto–Belisol | + 2" |
| 6 | Manuel Belletti (ITA) | Ag2r–La Mondiale | + 2" |
| 7 | Danilo Napolitano (ITA) | Accent Jobs–Wanty | + 2" |
| 8 | Alexander Porsev (RUS) | Team Katusha | + 2" |
| 9 | Davide Appollonio (ITA) | Ag2r–La Mondiale | + 2" |
| 10 | José Joaquín Rojas (ESP) | Movistar Team | + 2" |

General Classification after Stage 3

| | Rider | Team | Time |
|---|---|---|---|
| 1 | Arnaud Démare (FRA) | FDJ.fr | 12h 18' 42" |
| 2 | Lars Boom (NED) | Belkin Pro Cycling | + 1" |
| 3 | Zdeněk Štybar (CZE) | Omega Pharma–Quick-Step | + 3" |
| 4 | Mark Renshaw (AUS) | Belkin Pro Cycling | + 3" |
| 5 | Philippe Gilbert (BEL) | BMC Racing Team | + 4" |
| 6 | Tyler Farrar (USA) | Garmin–Sharp | + 6" |
| 7 | André Greipel (GER) | Lotto–Belisol | + 8" |
| 8 | Taylor Phinney (USA) | BMC Racing Team | + 8" |
| 9 | Alessandro Petacchi (ITA) | Omega Pharma–Quick-Step | + 10" |
| 10 | Jempy Drucker (LUX) | Accent Jobs–Wanty | + 10" |

=== Stage 4 ===
15 August 2013 — Essen (Belgium) to Vlijmen (Netherlands), 169.6 km (105.4 mi)

Stage 4 Result

| | Rider | Team | Time |
|---|---|---|---|
| 1 | André Greipel (GER) | Lotto–Belisol | 3h 47' 36" |
| 2 | Giacomo Nizzolo (ITA) | RadioShack–Leopard | s.t. |
| 3 | Lars Boom (NED) | Belkin Pro Cycling | s.t. |
| 4 | Alessandro Petacchi (ITA) | Omega Pharma–Quick-Step | s.t. |
| 5 | Alexander Porsev (RUS) | Team Katusha | s.t. |
| 6 | Tyler Farrar (USA) | Garmin–Sharp | s.t. |
| 7 | Jens Keukeleire (BEL) | Orica–GreenEDGE | s.t. |
| 8 | Yauheni Hutarovich (BLR) | Ag2r–La Mondiale | s.t. |
| 9 | Elia Viviani (ITA) | Cannondale | s.t. |
| 10 | Christopher Sutton (AUS) | Team Sky | s.t. |

General Classification after Stage 4

| | Rider | Team | Time |
|---|---|---|---|
| 1 | Lars Boom (NED) | Belkin Pro Cycling | 16h 06' 15" |
| 2 | André Greipel (GER) | Lotto–Belisol | + 1" |
| 3 | Arnaud Démare (FRA) | FDJ.fr | + 3" |
| 4 | Zdeněk Štybar (CZE) | Omega Pharma–Quick-Step | + 6" |
| 5 | Philippe Gilbert (BEL) | BMC Racing Team | + 7" |
| 6 | Tyler Farrar (USA) | Garmin–Sharp | + 9" |
| 7 | Alessandro Petacchi (ITA) | Omega Pharma–Quick-Step | + 13" |
| 8 | Giacomo Nizzolo (ITA) | RadioShack–Leopard | + 15" |
| 9 | Taylor Phinney (USA) | BMC Racing Team | + 17" |
| 10 | Pieter Jacobs (BEL) | Topsport Vlaanderen–Baloise | + 17" |

=== Stage 5 ===
16 August 2013 — Sittard-Geleen (Netherlands) to Sittard-Geleen (Netherlands), 13.2 km (8.2 mi), individual time trial (ITT)

Stage 5 Result

| | Rider | Team | Time |
|---|---|---|---|
| 1 | Sylvain Chavanel (FRA) | Omega Pharma–Quick-Step | 16' 04" |
| 2 | Tom Dumoulin (NED) | Argos–Shimano | + 4" |
| 3 | Jesse Sergent (NZL) | RadioShack–Leopard | + 4" |
| 4 | Sebastian Langeveld (NED) | Orica–GreenEDGE | + 6" |
| 5 | Bradley Wiggins (GBR) | Team Sky | + 9" |
| 6 | Taylor Phinney (USA) | BMC Racing Team | + 11" |
| 7 | Vladimir Gusev (RUS) | Team Katusha | + 14" |
| 8 | Lieuwe Westra (NED) | Vacansoleil–DCM | + 17" |
| 9 | Andriy Hryvko (UKR) | Astana | + 18" |
| 10 | Lars Boom (NED) | Belkin Pro Cycling | + 20" |

General Classification after Stage 5

| | Rider | Team | Time |
|---|---|---|---|
| 1 | Lars Boom (NED) | Belkin Pro Cycling | 16h 22' 39" |
| 2 | Sylvain Chavanel (FRA) | Omega Pharma–Quick-Step | + 4" |
| 3 | Tom Dumoulin (NED) | Argos–Shimano | + 8" |
| 4 | Taylor Phinney (USA) | BMC Racing Team | + 8" |
| 5 | Sebastian Langeveld (NED) | Orica–GreenEDGE | + 10" |
| 6 | Philippe Gilbert (BEL) | BMC Racing Team | + 18" |
| 7 | Andriy Hryvko (UKR) | Astana | + 23" |
| 8 | Zdeněk Štybar (CZE) | Omega Pharma–Quick-Step | + 24" |
| 9 | Vladimir Gusev (RUS) | Team Katusha | + 25" |
| 10 | Ian Stannard (GBR) | Team Sky | + 26" |

=== Stage 6 ===
17 August 2013 — Riemst (Belgium) to La Redoute (Belgium), 150.0 km (93.2 mi)

Stage 6 Result

| | Rider | Team | Time |
|---|---|---|---|
| 1 | David López (ESP) | Team Sky | 3h 51' 13" |
| 2 | Zdeněk Štybar (CZE) | Omega Pharma–Quick-Step | + 2" |
| 3 | Maciej Paterski (POL) | Cannondale | + 2" |
| 4 | Tom Dumoulin (NED) | Argos–Shimano | + 3" |
| 5 | Jan Bakelants (BEL) | RadioShack–Leopard | + 3" |
| 6 | Ángel Madrazo (ESP) | Movistar Team | + 3" |
| 7 | Lieuwe Westra (NED) | Vacansoleil–DCM | + 3" |
| 8 | Daryl Impey (RSA) | Orica–GreenEDGE | + 3" |
| 9 | Nick Nuyens (BEL) | Garmin–Sharp | + 12" |
| 10 | Arnold Jeannesson (FRA) | FDJ.fr | + 12" |

General Classification after Stage 6

| | Rider | Team | Time |
|---|---|---|---|
| 1 | Tom Dumoulin (NED) | Argos–Shimano | 20h 14' 03" |
| 2 | Zdeněk Štybar (CZE) | Omega Pharma–Quick-Step | + 9" |
| 3 | Andriy Hryvko (UKR) | Astana | + 24" |
| 4 | Jan Bakelants (BEL) | RadioShack–Leopard | + 29" |
| 5 | Daryl Impey (RSA) | Orica–GreenEDGE | + 29" |
| 6 | Lieuwe Westra (NED) | Vacansoleil–DCM | + 37" |
| 7 | Sylvain Chavanel (FRA) | Omega Pharma–Quick-Step | + 50" |
| 8 | Wilco Kelderman (NED) | Belkin Pro Cycling | + 1' 07" |
| 9 | Pieter Weening (NED) | Orica–GreenEDGE | + 1' 16" |
| 10 | Maxim Iglinsky (KAZ) | Astana | + 1' 33" |

=== Stage 7 ===
18 August 2013 — Tienen (Belgium) to Geraardsbergen (Belgium), 208.0 km (129.2 mi)

Stage 7 Result

| | Rider | Team | Time |
|---|---|---|---|
| 1 | Zdeněk Štybar (CZE) | Omega Pharma–Quick-Step | 5h 00' 03" |
| 2 | Ian Stannard (GBR) | Team Sky | + 4" |
| 3 | Lars Boom (NED) | Belkin Pro Cycling | + 12" |
| 4 | Manuel Quinziato (ITA) | BMC Racing Team | + 14" |
| 5 | Pieter Weening (NED) | Orica–GreenEDGE | + 17" |
| 6 | Daryl Impey (RSA) | Orica–GreenEDGE | + 25" |
| 7 | Wilco Kelderman (NED) | Belkin Pro Cycling | + 25" |
| 8 | Tom Dumoulin (NED) | Argos–Shimano | + 25" |
| 9 | Filippo Pozzato (ITA) | Lampre–Merida | + 25" |
| 10 | Laurens De Vreese (BEL) | Topsport Vlaanderen–Baloise | + 25" |

Final Classification

| | Rider | Team | Time |
|---|---|---|---|
| 1 | Zdeněk Štybar (CZE) | Omega Pharma–Quick-Step | 25h 14' 05" |
| 2 | Tom Dumoulin (NED) | Argos–Shimano | + 26" |
| 3 | Andriy Hryvko (UKR) | Astana | + 50" |
| 4 | Jan Bakelants (BEL) | RadioShack–Leopard | + 55" |
| 5 | Daryl Impey (RSA) | Orica–GreenEDGE | + 55" |
| 6 | Sylvain Chavanel (FRA) | Omega Pharma–Quick-Step | + 1' 20" |
| 7 | Wilco Kelderman (NED) | Belkin Pro Cycling | + 1' 32" |
| 8 | Pieter Weening (NED) | Orica–GreenEDGE | + 1' 34" |
| 9 | Maxim Iglinsky (KAZ) | Astana | + 2' 07" |
| 10 | Maxime Monfort (BEL) | RadioShack–Leopard | + 2' 14" |

== Classification leadership table ==
| Stage | Winner | General classification | Points classification | Combativity Classification | Team classification |
|---|---|---|---|---|---|
| 1 | Mark Renshaw | Mark Renshaw | Mark Renshaw | Laurens De Vreese | Belkin Pro Cycling |
| 2 | Arnaud Démare | Arnaud Démare | Taylor Phinney | Laurens De Vreese | FDJ.fr |
| 3 | Zdeněk Štybar | Arnaud Démare | André Greipel | Laurens De Vreese | FDJ.fr |
| 4 | André Greipel | Lars Boom | André Greipel | Laurens De Vreese | Omega Pharma–Quick-Step |
| 5 | Sylvain Chavanel | Lars Boom | André Greipel | Laurens De Vreese | Omega Pharma–Quick-Step |
| 6 | David López | Tom Dumoulin | André Greipel | Laurens De Vreese | RadioShack–Leopard |
| 7 | Zdeněk Štybar | Zdeněk Štybar | Lars Boom | Laurens De Vreese | Omega Pharma–Quick-Step |
| Final | | Zdeněk Štybar | Lars Boom | Laurens De Vreese | Omega Pharma–Quick-Step |
