= David López (cyclist) =

Road bicycle racer

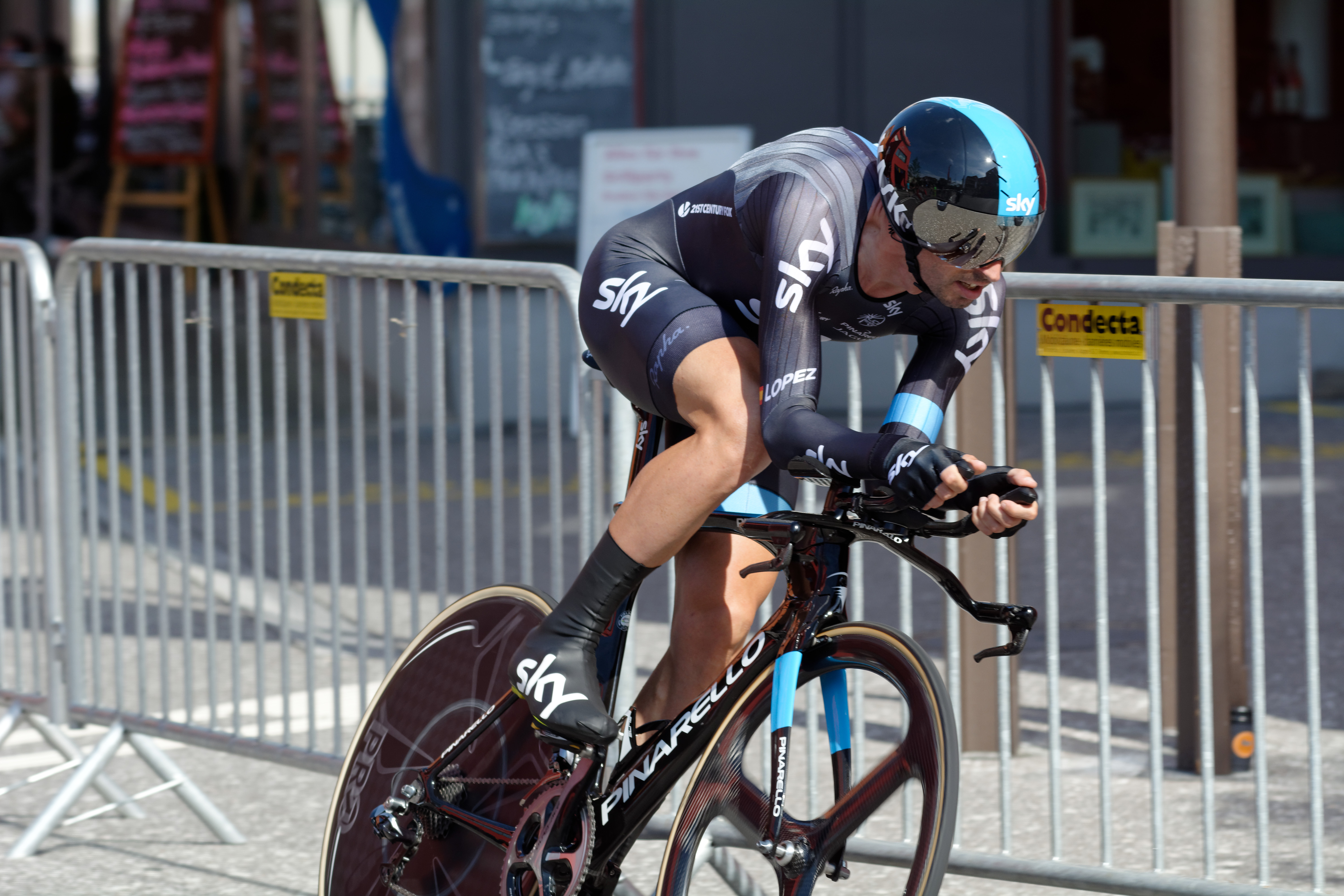
- López at the 2015 Tour de Suisse.

Personal information
- Full name: David López Garcia
- Born: 13 May 1981 (age 45) Barakaldo, Spain
- Height: 1.79 m (5 ft 10 in)
- Weight: 67 kg (148 lb)

Cycling career
- Sport: Cycling
- Discipline: Road
- Role: Rider
- Rider type: Climber

Professional teams
- 2003–2004: Café Baqué
- 2005–2006: Euskaltel–Euskadi
- 2007–2012: Caisse d'Epargne
- 2013–2018: Team Sky

Major wins
- Grand Tours Vuelta a España 1 individual stage (2010) 1 TTT stage (2016)

David López García (born 13 May 1981) is a Spanish former professional road racing cyclist, who competed between 2003 and 2018 for the Café Baqué, Euskaltel–Euskadi, Movistar Team and Team Sky squads.

== Career ==
López was born in Barakaldo. The biggest victory of his career was the ninth stage of the 2010 Vuelta a España, a mountain stage with 6 categorized climbs on the menu. Lopez went clear of the leading group with 3 km (1.9 mi) to go, crossing the line with an advantage of six seconds over Liquigas–Doimo's Roman Kreuziger.

He joined the Caisse d'Epargne team in 2007 after turning professional for Euskaltel–Euskadi in 2005. He left the Movistar Team at the end of 2012 and joined Team Sky for the 2013 season.

== Major results ==
2004
6th Overall Tour de l'Avenir
2005
7th Overall Vuelta a Aragón
2006
7th Overall Volta a la Comunitat Valenciana
2007
2nd Subida a Urkiola
3rd Overall Deutschland Tour

1st Stage 5

4th Klasika Primavera
6th Overall Paris–Nice
6th Overall Vuelta a Castilla y León
2008
3rd GP Ouest–France
4th Subida a Urkiola
10th Overall Tour du Limousin
2009
3rd Subida al Naranco
7th Overall Vuelta a Andalucía
8th Cholet-Pays de Loire
2010
1st Stage 9 Vuelta a España
2011
2nd Klasika Primavera
6th Overall Vuelta a Burgos
7th Overall Tour of the Basque Country
7th Overall Tour Méditerranéen
9th Overall Critérium International
2012
4th Overall Vuelta a Asturias
4th Klasika Primavera
8th Prueba Villafranca de Ordizia
2013
1st Stage 6 Eneco Tour
3rd Overall Tour of Beijing
4th Overall Tour of Britain
4th Japan Cup
2015
3rd Overall Tour of Norway
2016
Vuelta a España

1st Stage 1 (TTT)
Combativity award Stage 12

=== Grand Tour general classification results timeline ===
Grand Tour	2003	2004	2005	2006	2007	2008	2009	2010	2011	2012	2013	2014	2015	2016	2017
Giro d'Italia	—	—	DNF	40	—	—	DNF	—	—	—	—	—	—	69	—
Tour de France	—	—	—	DNF	—	51	—	—	—	—	127	105	—	—	—
Vuelta a España	47	—	79	—	14	—	42	42	DNF	—	—	—	—	60	66
