= Matthieu Ladagnous =

Racing cyclist

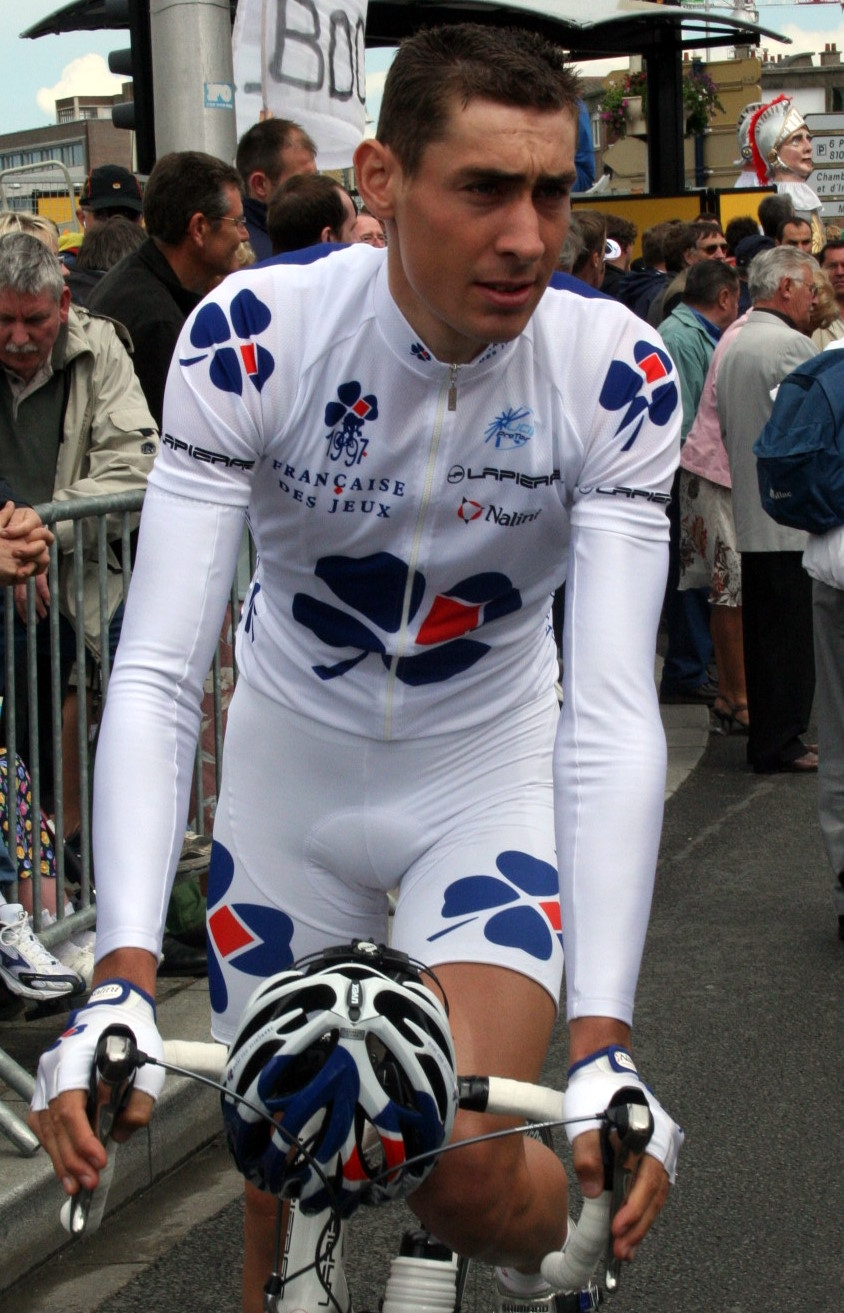
- Ladagnous at the 2007 Tour de France

Personal information
- Born: 12 December 1984 (age 41) Pau, France
- Height: 1.82 m (6 ft 0 in)
- Weight: 73 kg (161 lb)

Cycling career
- Sport: Cycling
- Current team: Retired
- Disciplines: Road; Track
- Role: Rider
- Rider type: Rouleur

Professional team
- 2006–2023: Française des Jeux

Matthieu Ladagnous (born 12 December 1984) is a French former road and track racing cyclist, who competed as a professional from 2006 to 2023, spending his entire career with UCI WorldTeam Française des Jeux.

Riding entirely for the Française des Jeux team and its succeeding iterations since his début in 2006, Ladagnous has taken eleven victories during his professional career, including victories in the 2007 Four Days of Dunkirk and 2009 La Tropicale Amissa Bongo Ondimbo stage races.

== Career ==
Born in Pau, Ladagnous became junior world champion at the madison in Melbourne, Australia in 2002 with his partner Tom Thiblier. In 2003 he won the French national title at the points race for the under-23 level. He also won a bronze medal at the individual sprint (under-23) and a silver medal at the madison with Fabien Patanchon in the elite class. Later that year he and Patanchon became European champions at the under-23 track cycling championships. A year later he won the bronze medal at the scratch in the 2003 under-23 championships. He improved his bronze national individual pursuit manager into a gold, while his points race gold was changed in a silver in 2004. In the elite class he won the madison gold, again alongside Patanchon.

In 2005 he first continued as a track cyclist and added another national under-23 silver to his palmarès at the individual pursuit. A silver medal in the elite class was added at the madison where he teamed up with Patanchon again. At the team pursuit he, Anthony Langella, Fabien Sanchez and Mickaël Mallie won the gold medal and became national elite champions. At the 2005 European championships in Fiorenzuola d'Arda he won a silver medal at the points race. In 2005 he also made his first road cycling appearance. He immediately won the prologue in the Mainfranken-Tour (under-23) and the overall classification. He decided to focus mainly at the road for the 2006 season, but won another team pursuit gold with Mickaël Delage, Jonathan Mouchel, Mikaël Preau and Sylvain Blanquefort. He booked his first road race win in 2006, when he won the fifth stage of the Tour Méditerranéen. The following year he won the fifth stage and the general classification of the Four Days of Dunkirk.

He was named in the start list for the 2017 Giro d'Italia.

In January 2023, entering his eighteenth season as a professional – all with Groupama–FDJ and its preceding iterations – Ladagnous announced that he would retire from the sport at the end of the year.

== Personal life ==
He is the brother of French rugby union international Caroline Ladagnous.

== Major results ==
=== Track ===
2002
1st Madison, UCI Junior Track Cycling World Championships
2003
1st Madison, UEC European Under-23 Track Championships
National Track Championships

1st Under-23 points race
2nd Madison
3rd Under-23 individual pursuit

2004
National Track Championships

1st Madison
1st Under-23 individual pursuit
2nd Points race

3rd Scratch, UEC European Under-23 Track Championships
3rd Scratch, UCI Track World Cup Classics, Sydney
2005
National Track Championships

1st Team pursuit
2nd Madison
2nd Under-23 individual pursuit

2nd Points race, UEC European Under-23 Track Championships
2nd UIV Cup, Rotterdam
2006
1st Team pursuit, National Track Championships

=== Road ===
2005
1st Overall Mainfranken-Tour Under-23

1st Prologue

1st Overall Kreiz Breizh Elites

1st Stages 2a & 3

5th Overall Tour du Loir-et-Cher
9th Road race, Mediterranean Games
2006
1st Stage 5 Tour Méditerranéen
6th Grand Prix de Plumelec-Morbihan
6th Tour de Vendée
7th Le Samyn
2007
1st Overall Four Days of Dunkirk

1st Young rider classification
1st Stage 5

4th Overall Circuit de la Sarthe

1st Young rider classification

2009
1st Overall La Tropicale Amissa Bongo Ondimbo

1st Stage 1

1st Polynormande
2nd Tour de Vendée
4th Overall Tour du Haut Var
4th Overall Tour de Wallonie
7th Kuurne–Brussels–Kuurne
9th Overall Étoile de Bessèges
10th Overall Four Days of Dunkirk
10th Grand Prix d'Ouverture La Marseillaise
2010
2nd Overall Étoile de Bessèges
2nd Cholet-Pays de Loire
4th Tour du Doubs
2011
1st Stage 1 Tour de Wallonie
2nd Overall Tour du Limousin

1st Stages 3 & 4

4th Tour du Doubs
5th Overall Driedaagse van West-Vlaanderen
7th Tro-Bro Léon
8th Polynormande
2012
5th Grand Prix de Plumelec-Morbihan
6th Overall Driedaagse van West-Vlaanderen
7th E3 Harelbeke
8th Omloop Het Nieuwsblad
2013
1st Boucles de l'Aulne
1st Stage 3 Tour du Limousin
5th Tour of Flanders
6th Gent–Wevelgem
6th Grand Prix de Plumelec-Morbihan
8th Overall Driedaagse van West-Vlaanderen
8th Gran Premio Nobili Rubinetterie
2014
7th Tour de Vendée
2015
4th Overall Tour du Haut Var
5th Grand Prix de Plumelec-Morbihan
2016
2nd Overall La Méditerranéenne

1st Stage 1 (TTT)

4th Grand Prix de Plumelec-Morbihan
6th Overall Tour de Picardie
10th Omloop Het Nieuwsblad
2018
7th Paris–Camembert
8th La Roue Tourangelle
8th Tour du Doubs
8th Gran Premio Bruno Beghelli
2020
Combativity award Stage 11 Tour de France
2022
10th Tro-Bro Léon

==== Grand Tour general classification results timeline ====
Grand Tour	2007	2008	2009	2010	2011	2012	2013	2014	2015	2016	2017	2018	2019	2020
Giro d'Italia	—	—	—	—	—	—	—	—	—	—	97	DNF	—	—
Tour de France	112	—	—	93	—	85	—	76	71	DNF	—	—	126	94
/ Vuelta a España	—	89	63	—	—	—	—	—	—	98	—	—	—	DNF

Legend
—	Did not compete
DNF	Did not finish
