= 2012–13 UCI Asia Tour =

Cycling competition

- Ninth edition of the UCI Asia Tour

Details
- Dates: 20 October 2012–30 September 2013
- Location: Asia
- Races: 35

Champions
- Individual champion: Julián Arredondo (COL) (Team Nippo–De Rosa)
- Teams' champion: Tabriz Petrochemical Team
- Nations' champion: Iran

The 2012–13 UCI Asia Tour was the 9th season of the UCI Asia Tour. The season began on 20 October 2012 with the Tour of Hainan and ended on 30 September 2013 with the Tour of China II.

The points leader, based on the cumulative results of previous races, wears the UCI Asia Tour cycling jersey. Hossein Alizadeh from Iran was the defending champion of the 2011–12 UCI Asia Tour. Julián Arredondo from Colombia was crowned as the 2012–13 UCI Asia Tour champion.

Throughout the season, points are awarded to the top finishers of stages within stage races and the final general classification standings of each of the stages races and one-day events. The quality and complexity of a race also determines how many points are awarded to the top finishers, the higher the UCI rating of a race, the more points are awarded.

The UCI ratings from highest to lowest are as follows:

- Multi-day events: 2.HC, 2.1 and 2.2
- One-day events: 1.HC, 1.1 and 1.2

== Events ==
=== 2012 ===
Date	Race Name	Location	UCI Rating	Winner	Team
20–28 October	Tour of Hainan	China	2.HC	Dmitriy Gruzdev (KAZ)	Astana
21 October	Japan Cup	Japan	1.HC	Ivan Basso (ITA)	Liquigas–Cannondale
1–8 November	Tour of Taihu Lake	China	2.1	Milan Kadlec (CZE)	ASC Dukla Praha
18–20 November	Tour of Fuzhou	China	2.2	Choi Ki Ho (HKG)	Hong Kong (national team)
25 November	Tour de Okinawa	Japan	1.2	Thomas Palmer (AUS)	Drapac Cycling
7–9 December	Tour de Ijen	Indonesia	2.2	Choi Ki Ho (HKG)	Hong Kong (national team)
17–21 December	Tour of Vietnam	Vietnam	2.2	Huang En (CHN)	Max Success Sports

=== 2013 ===
Date	Race Name	Location	UCI Rating	Winner	Team
3–8 February	Tour of Qatar	Qatar	2.HC	Mark Cavendish (GBR)	Omega Pharma–Quick-Step
11–16 February	Tour of Oman	Oman	2.HC	Chris Froome (GBR)	Team Sky
21 February–2 March	Tour de Langkawi	Malaysia	2.HC	Julián Arredondo (COL)	Team Nippo–De Rosa
14 March	Asian Cycling Championships – Time trial	India	CC	Muradjan Khalmuratov (UZB)	Uzbekistan national team
17 March	Asian Cycling Championships – Road race	India	CC	Muradjan Khalmuratov (UZB)	Uzbekistan national team
18–24 March	Tour de Taiwan	Taiwan	2.1	Bernard Sulzberger (AUS)	Drapac Cycling
1–6 April	Tour of Thailand	Thailand	2.2	Choi Ki Ho (HKG)	Hong Kong national team
13–16 April	Le Tour de Filipinas	Philippines	2.2	Ghader Mizbani (IRI)	Tabriz Petrochemical Team
21 April	Melaka Governor Cup	Malaysia	1.2	Lex Nederlof (NED)	CCN Cycling Team
19–26 May	Tour of Japan	Japan	2.2	Fortunato Baliani (ITA)	Team Nippo-De Rosa
22–27 May	Tour of Iran	Iran	2.2	Ghader Mizbani (IRI)	Tabriz Petrochemical Team
30 May–2 June	Tour de Kumano	Japan	2.2	Julián Arredondo (COL)	Team Nippo–De Rosa
3–9 June	Tour de Singkarak	Indonesia	2.2	Ghader Mizbani (IRI)	Tabriz Petrochemical Team
9–16 June	Tour de Korea	South Korea	2.2	Michael Cuming (GBR)	Rapha Condor–JLT
26–30 June	Jelajah Malaysia	Malaysia	2.2	Loh Sea Keong (MAS)	OCBC Singapore Continental Cycling Team
7–20 July	Tour of Qinghai Lake	China	2.HC	Samad Poor Seiedi (IRI)	Tabriz Petrochemical Team
18–22 August	Tour de Borneo	Malaysia	2.2	Ghader Mizbani (IRI)	Tabriz Petrochemical Team
4–7 September	Tour de East Java	Indonesia	2.2	José Vicente Toribio (ESP)	Team Ukyo
13–20 September	Tour of China I	China	2.1	Kirill Pozdnyakov (RUS)	Synergy Baku Cycling Project
14–16 September	Tour de Hokkaido	Japan	2.2	Thomas Lebas (FRA)	Bridgestone Anchor
23–30 September	Tour of China II	China	2.1	Alois Kaňkovský (CZE)	ASC Dukla Praha

== Final standings ==
There is a competition for the rider, team and country with the most points gained from winning or achieving a high place in the above races.

Updated 30 September 2013

=== Individual classification ===
Rank	Name	Points
1	Julián Arredondo (COL)	343
2	Alois Kaňkovský (CZE)	288
3	Ghader Mizbani (IRI)	276
4	Samad Poor Seiedi (IRI)	269
5	Benjamin Giraud (FRA)	245
6	Choi Ki Ho (HKG)	243
7	Milan Kadlec (CZE)	202
8	Kiryll Pozdnyakov (RUS)	200
9	Muradjan Khalmuratov (UZB)	186
10	Fortunato Baliani (ITA)	172

=== Team classification ===
Rank	Team	Points
1	Tabriz Petrochemical Team	813
2	Team Nippo–De Rosa	609
3	ASC Dukla Praha	518
4	Synergy Baku Cycling Project	493
5	Continental Team Astana	425
6	La Pomme Marseille	346
7	Terengganu Cycling Team	333
8	Drapac Cycling	328
9	RTS–Santic Racing Team	291
10	Bridgestone–Anchor	256

=== Nation classification ===
Rank	Nation	Points
1	Iran	1068
2	Kazakhstan	649
3	Japan	593
4	Hong Kong	592
5	Malaysia	588.25
6	Uzbekistan	317
7	South Korea	278.25
8	Indonesia	193
9	China	185
10	Kyrgyzstan	148

=== Nation under-23 classification ===
Rank	Nation	Points
1	Hong Kong	460
2	Kazakhstan	405
3	Iran	223
4	Malaysia	127.25
5	South Korea	84
6	Lebanon	84
7	Indonesia	48
8	Thailand	42
9	Japan	41
10	Uzbekistan	22
