= 2011 Movistar Team season =

2011 Movistar Team season
Manager	Eusebio Unzué
One-day victories	3
Stage race overall victories	3
Stage race stage victories	14
Previous season • Next season

The 2011 season for Movistar Team began in January at the Tour de San Luis and ended in October at the Giro di Lombardia. As a UCI ProTeam, they were automatically invited and obligated to send a squad to every event in the UCI World Tour.

With twenty victories to their credit, the team had a reasonably successful 2011 season competitively, but the year was very tumultuous for reasons outside competition. After a successful early season, including the overall crown at the Vuelta a Castilla y León, team rider Xavier Tondó was killed in a freak accident at his home while preparing for a training ride with teammate Beñat Intxausti. Later in the season, Mauricio Soler sustained a horrific crash at the Tour de Suisse, which could easily have cost him his life as well. After more than four months in the hospital, Soler was released, but his recovery was far from complete at that time.

== 2011 roster ==
Ages as of January 1, 2011.

Rider	Date of birth
Andrey Amador (CRC)	August 29, 1986 (aged 24)
David Arroyo (ESP)	January 7, 1980 (aged 30)
Marzio Bruseghin (ITA)	June 15, 1974 (aged 36)
Rui Costa (POR)	October 5, 1986 (aged 24)
Imanol Erviti (ESP)	November 15, 1983 (aged 27)
José Vicente García (ESP)	August 4, 1972 (aged 38)
Iván Gutiérrez (ESP)	November 27, 1978 (aged 32)
Jesús Herrada (ESP)	July 26, 1990 (aged 20)
Beñat Intxausti (ESP)	March 20, 1986 (aged 24)
Javier Iriarte (ESP)	November 11, 1986 (aged 24)
Vasil Kiryienka (BLR)	June 28, 1981 (aged 29)
Ignatas Konovalovas (LTU)	December 8, 1985 (aged 25)
Pablo Lastras (ESP)	January 20, 1976 (aged 34)

Rider	Date of birth
David Lopez (ESP)	May 13, 1981 (aged 29)
Angel Madrazo (ESP)	July 30, 1988 (aged 22)
Carlos Oyarzún (CHI)	October 26, 1981 (aged 29)
Luis Pasamontes (ESP)	October 2, 1979 (aged 31)
Sergio Pardilla (ESP)	January 16, 1984 (aged 26)
Francisco Pérez (ESP)	July 22, 1978 (aged 32)
Rubén Plaza (ESP)	February 29, 1980 (aged 30)
José Joaquín Rojas Gil (ESP)	June 8, 1985 (aged 25)
Branislau Samoilau (BLR)	May 25, 1985 (aged 25)
Enrique Sanz (ESP)	September 11, 1989 (aged 21)
Mauricio Soler (COL)	January 14, 1983 (aged 27)
Xavier Tondó (Note: Tondó died on May 23 after an accident at his home.) (ESP)	November 5, 1978 (aged 32)
Francisco Ventoso (ESP)	May 6, 1982 (aged 28)

Riders who joined the team for the 2011 season

Rider	2010 team
Jesús Herrada	neo-pro
Beñat Intxausti	Euskaltel–Euskadi
Javier Iriarte	ex-pro (Burgos Monumental, 2008)
Ignatas Konovalovas	Cervélo TestTeam
Carlos Oyarzun	Supermercados Froiz
Sergio Pardilla	Carmiooro NGC
Branislau Samoilau	Quick-Step
Enrique Sanz	neo-pro
Xavier Tondó	Cervélo TestTeam
Francisco Ventoso	Andalucía–Cajasur

Riders who left the team during or after the 2010 season

Rider	2011 team
Juan José Cobo	Geox–TMC
Arnaud Coyot	Saur–Sojasun
Mathieu Drujon	BigMat–Auber 93
Arnold Jeannesson	FDJ
Alberto Losada	Team Katusha
Christophe Moreau	Retired
Mathieu Perget	Ag2r–La Mondiale
Luis León Sánchez	Rabobank
Rigoberto Urán	Team Sky
Alejandro Valverde	Suspended
Xabier Zandio	Team Sky

== One-day races ==
Before the spring season and the races known as classics, the team got a win in the Vuelta a Mallorca series. After making a 40-rider selection with 15 km (9.3 mi) remaining in the Trofeo Deià, Rojas won the resulting sprint among those riders.

=== Spring classics ===
The Vuelta a La Rioja was the team's first traditional one-day win. Erviti finished first ahead of two Colombian riders from a UCI Continental team, eight seconds ahead of the main field.

The team also sent squads to Milan–San Remo, Gent–Wevelgem, the Tour of Flanders, Paris–Roubaix, the Amstel Gold Race, La Flèche Wallonne and Liège–Bastogne–Liège, but placed no higher than 11th in any of these races.

=== Fall races ===
The team also sent squads to the Clásica de San Sebastián, the Grand Prix Cycliste de Québec, and the Giro di Lombardia, but placed no higher than 11th in any of these races.

== Stage races ==
The team picked up wins in two simultaneous events at the beginning of the season. At the Tour de San Luis, new acquisition Tondó won the 19.5 km (12.1 mi) individual time trial, gaining a 30-second lead over Androni Giocattoli's José Serpa in the process with three days left to race. In the race's penultimate stage, however, Tondó dramatically bonked and crashed on the descent of the Cerro El Amago, the day's last climb. He had stayed with the race's top riders and seemed to be a 15 km (9.3 mi) descent and an easy, flat final stage away from winning the race. Instead, he lost 15 minutes on the day, and finished the race in 23rd place. Also in January, the squad sent to the Tour Down Under came away with another win. Ventoso won the race's queen stage in Willunga ahead of the sprinters who populated the top of the general classification standings. Ventoso was the squad's top finisher in the final overall standings, in sixth place. The squad narrowly won the teams classification, beating Vacansoleil–DCM by eight seconds. Ventoso added a sprint win in February in stage 3 of the Ruta del Sol. The team did not win any stage at Critérium International in March, but they did win the teams classification and have Kiryienka on the final podium in second. With strong placings in all three stages, Kiryienka also won the event's points classification. Rojas won the sprint finish to stage 6 of the concurrent Volta a Catalunya, with nearly the entire peloton finishing together.

Kiryienka won stage 2 at the Tour of the Basque Country with a late-race solo attack. He initially drew four others with him, but a second surge 1,400 m (4,600 ft) from the line gave him the win two seconds ahead of the leading group on the road. It was the Belarusian's first race win since a stage in the 2008 Giro d'Italia. The squad also won the team award at this event. Later in April, the team had a very strong Vuelta a Castilla y León. Ventoso won the first two stages in field sprints, keying of the sprint train Team Sky was trying to use to set up their sprinter Russell Downing on both days. The overall classification was left wide open the next day when three-time champion Alberto Contador suffered mechanical trouble on the race's only summit finish, the Laguna de los Peces, and lost two minutes. Tondó finished fifth on the stage, and was in second overall just three seconds behind new race leader Bauke Mollema. Tondó was third in the race's individual time trial the next day, taking the race lead since he gained 12 seconds on Mollema. The time gaps held on the final stage, meaning Tondó won the race overall. Ventoso added a second place in stage 5 to his two wins earlier to handily win the points classification, though he would have won it even if he had not scored in the final stage. Neo-pro Sanz took the first win of his career at the Vuelta a la Comunidad de Madrid in a short (84.8 km (52.7 mi)) road race held the same day as the prologue time trial. The young Spaniard came first in the field sprint. The next day, Costa finished second on the Puerto de la Morcuera summit by 14 seconds, but this performance was enough to make him the race's overall winner. The team also won two classification awards, with Costa taking the points title and Herrada the youth classification.

The team also sent squads to the Tour Méditerranéen, the Tour du Haut Var, Vuelta a Murcia, Paris–Nice, Tirreno–Adriatico, the Tour de Romandie, Vuelta a Asturias, the Circuit de Lorraine, the Critérium du Dauphiné, the Brixia Tour, the Tour de Pologne, the Eneco Tour, the Tour du Poitou-Charentes and the Tour of Beijing, but did not achieve a stage win, classification win, or podium finish in any of them.

== Season victories ==
Date	Race	Competition	Rider	Country	Location
January 20	Tour de San Luis, Stage 4	UCI America Tour	Xavier Tondó (ESP)	Argentina	San Luis
January 22	Tour Down Under, Stage 5	UCI World Tour	Francisco Ventoso (ESP)	Australia	Willunga
January 23	Tour Down Under, Teams classification	UCI World Tour	(Note: The riders on the squad were José Joaquín Rojas, Iván Gutiérrez, David López García, Ángel Madrazo, Luis Pasamontes, José Vicente García, and Francisco Ventoso)	Australia	
February 9	Trofeo Deià	UCI Europe Tour	José Joaquín Rojas (ESP)	Spain	Deià
February 22	Vuelta a Andalucía, Stage 3	UCI Europe Tour	Francisco Ventoso (ESP)	Spain	Jaén
March 26	Volta a Catalunya, Stage 6	UCI World Tour	José Joaquín Rojas (ESP)	Spain	Mollet del Vallès
March 27	Critérium International, Points classification	UCI Europe Tour	Vasil Kiryienka (BLR)	France	
March 27	Critérium International, Teams classification	UCI Europe Tour	(Note: The riders on the squad were David Arroyo, Marzio Bruseghin, Iván Gutiérrez, Jesus Herrada, Vasil Kiryienka, David López García, Sergio Pardilla and Branislau Samoilau)	France	
April 5	Tour of the Basque Country, Stage 2	UCI World Tour	Vasil Kiryienka (BLR)	Spain	Lekunberri
April 9	Tour of the Basque Country, Teams classification	UCI World Tour	(Note: The riders on the squad were David Arroyo, Marzio Bruseghin, David López García, Beñat Intxausti, Xavier Tondó, José Vicente García, Ángel Madrazo and Vasil Kiryienka)	Spain	
April 13	Vuelta a Castilla y León, Stage 1	UCI Europe Tour	Francisco Ventoso (ESP)	Spain	Palencia
April 14	Vuelta a Castilla y León, Stage 2	UCI Europe Tour	Francisco Ventoso (ESP)	Spain	Salamanca
April 17	Vuelta a Castilla y León, Overall	UCI Europe Tour	Xavier Tondó (ESP)	Spain	
April 17	Vuelta a Castilla y León, Points classification	UCI Europe Tour	Francisco Ventoso (ESP)	Spain	
April 24	Vuelta a La Rioja	UCI Europe Tour	Imanol Erviti (ESP)	Spain	Logroño
May 7	Vuelta a la Comunidad de Madrid, Stage 2	UCI Europe Tour	Enrique Sanz (ESP)	Spain	Coslada
May 8	Vuelta a la Comunidad de Madrid, Overall	UCI Europe Tour	Rui Costa (POR)	Spain	
May 8	Vuelta a la Comunidad de Madrid, Points classification	UCI Europe Tour	Rui Costa (POR)	Spain	
May 8	Vuelta a la Comunidad de Madrid, Young rider classification	UCI Europe Tour	Jesús Herrada (ESP)	Spain	
May 12	Giro d'Italia, Stage 6	UCI World Tour	Francisco Ventoso (ESP)	Italy	Fiuggi
May 28	Giro d'Italia, Stage 20	UCI World Tour	Vasil Kiryienka (BLR)	Italy	Sestriere
June 12	Tour de Suisse, Stage 2	UCI World Tour	Mauricio Soler (COL)	Switzerland	Crans-Montana
June 19	Route du Sud, Overall	UCI Europe Tour	Vasil Kiryienka (BLR)	France	
June 19	Route du Sud, Teams classification	UCI Europe Tour	(Note: The riders on the squad were David Arroyo, Javier Iriarte, Vasil Kiryienka, Francisco Pérez, Sergio Pardilla, Luis Pasamontes and Enrique Sanz)	France	
July 9	Tour de France, Stage 8	UCI World Tour	Rui Costa (POR)	France	Super Besse
August 5	Vuelta a Burgos, Stage 3	UCI Europe Tour	Team time trial (Note: The riders on the squad were David Arroyo, José Vicente Garcia, Beñat Intxausti, David López García, Sergio Pardilla, Jesús Herrada, Pablo Lastras, and Francisco Ventoso)	France	
August 22	Vuelta a España, Stage 3	UCI World Tour	Pablo Lastras (ESP)	Spain	Totana
September 11	Grand Prix Cycliste de Montréal	UCI World Tour	Rui Costa (POR)	Canada	Montreal
