= 2013 Movistar Team season =

2013 Movistar Team season
Manager	Eusebio Unzué
One-day victories	3
Stage race overall victories	6
Stage race stage victories	18
Previous season • Next season

The 2013 season for Movistar Team began in January at the Tour Down Under. As a UCI ProTeam, they were automatically invited and obligated to send a squad to every event in the UCI World Tour.

== 2013 roster ==
As of 1 January 2013.

Rider	Date of birth
Andrey Amador (CRC)	29 August 1986 (age 38)
Eros Capecchi (ITA)	13 June 1986 (age 38)
Jonathan Castroviejo (ESP)	27 April 1987 (age 37)
Juan José Cobo (ESP)	11 February 1981 (age 44)
Rui Costa (POR)	5 October 1986 (age 38)
Alex Dowsett (GBR)	3 October 1988 (age 36)
Imanol Erviti (ESP)	15 November 1983 (age 41)
Iván Gutiérrez (ESP)	27 November 1978 (age 46)
Jesús Herrada (ESP)	26 July 1990 (age 34)
José Herrada (ESP)	1 October 1985 (age 39)
Beñat Intxausti (ESP)	20 March 1986 (age 39)
Vladimir Karpets (RUS)	20 September 1980 (age 44)
Pablo Lastras (ESP)	20 January 1976 (age 49)

Rider	Date of birth
Ángel Madrazo (ESP)	30 July 1988 (age 36)
Javier Moreno (ESP)	18 July 1984 (age 40)
Argiro Ospina (COL)	3 September 1991 (age 33)
Rubén Plaza (ESP)	29 February 1980 (age 45)
Nairo Quintana (COL)	4 February 1990 (age 35)
José Joaquín Rojas (ESP)	8 June 1985 (age 39)
Enrique Sanz (ESP)	11 September 1989 (age 35)
Sylwester Szmyd (POL)	2 March 1978 (age 47)
Eloy Teruel (ESP)	20 November 1982 (age 42)
Alejandro Valverde (ESP)	25 April 1980 (age 44)
Francisco Ventoso (ESP)	6 May 1982 (age 42)
Giovanni Visconti (ITA)	13 January 1983 (age 42)

Riders who joined the team for the 2013 season

Rider	2012 team
Eros Capecchi	Liquigas–Cannondale
Alex Dowsett	Team Sky
Argiro Ospina	neo-pro (Gobernacion de Antioquia)
Sylwester Szmyd	Liquigas–Cannondale
Eloy Teruel	ex-pro (Contentpolis-Ampo, 2009)

Riders who left the team during or after the 2012 season

Rider	2012 team
David Arroyo	Caja Rural
Marzio Bruseghin	Retired
Javier Iriarte	Retired
Vasil Kiryienka	Team Sky
Ignatas Konovalovas	MTN–Qhubeka
David López	Team Sky
Sergio Pardilla	MTN–Qhubeka
Branislau Samoilau	

== Season victories ==
Date	Race	Competition	Rider	Country	Location
27 January	Tour Down Under, Mountains classification	UCI World Tour	Javier Moreno (ESP)	Australia	
5 February	Trofeo Serra de Tramuntana	UCI Europe Tour	Alejandro Valverde (ESP)	Spain	Serra de Tramuntana
17 February	Vuelta a Andalucía, Prologue	UCI Europe Tour	Alejandro Valverde (ESP)	Spain	San Fernando
20 February	Vuelta a Andalucía, Stage 3	UCI Europe Tour	Alejandro Valverde (ESP)	Spain	Rincón de la Victoria
20 February	Vuelta a Andalucía, Overall	UCI Europe Tour	Alejandro Valverde (ESP)	Spain	
20 February	Vuelta a Andalucía, Points classification	UCI Europe Tour	Alejandro Valverde (ESP)	Spain	
20 February	Vuelta a Andalucía, Teams classification	UCI Europe Tour	(Note: The riders on the squad were Alejandro Valverde, José Joaquín Rojas, Javier Moreno, Iván Gutiérrez, Rubén Plaza, Imanol Erviti and Nairo Quintana)	Spain	
12 March	Tirreno–Adriatico, Teams classification	UCI World Tour	(Note: The riders on the squad were Andrey Amador, Eros Capecchi, Jonathan Castroviejo, Juan José Cobo, Alex Dowsett, Beñat Intxausti, Giovanni Visconti and Francisco Ventoso)	Italy	
20 March	Volta a Catalunya, Stage 3	UCI World Tour	Nairo Quintana (COL)	Spain	Setcases
4 April	Tour of the Basque Country, Stage 4	UCI World Tour	Nairo Quintana (COL)	Spain	Eibar
6 April	Tour of the Basque Country, Overall	UCI World Tour	Nairo Quintana (COL)	Spain	
6 April	Tour of the Basque Country, Points classification	UCI World Tour	Nairo Quintana (COL)	Spain	
6 April	Tour of the Basque Country, Teams classification	UCI World Tour	(Note: The riders on the squad were Nairo Quintana, Jonathan Castroviejo, Juan José Cobo, Rui Costa, Jesús Herrada, Beñat Intxausti, Ángel Madrazo and Javier Moreno)	Spain	
7 April	Klasika Primavera	UCI Europe Tour	Rui Costa (POR)	Spain	Amorebieta
14 April	Vuelta a Castilla y León, Stage 3	UCI Europe Tour	Rubén Plaza (ESP)	Spain	Cervera de Pisuerga
14 April	Vuelta a Castilla y León, Overall	UCI Europe Tour	Rubén Plaza (ESP)	Spain	
14 April	Vuelta a Castilla y León, Teams classification	UCI Europe Tour	(Note: The riders on the squad were Javier Moreno, Iván Gutiérrez, Rubén Plaza, José Joaquín Rojas, Vladimir Karpets, Enrique Sanz, Sylwester Szmyd and Eloy Teruel)	Spain	
4 May	Vuelta a la Comunidad de Madrid	UCI Europe Tour	Javier Moreno (ESP)	Spain	Madrid
11 May	Giro d'Italia, Stage 8	UCI World Tour	Alex Dowsett (GBR)	Italy	Saltara
12 May	Vuelta a Asturias, Stage 2	UCI Europe Tour	Javier Moreno (ESP)	Spain	Alto del Naranco
19 May	Giro d'Italia, Stage 15	UCI World Tour	Giovanni Visconti (ITA)	France	Les Granges du Galibier
21 May	Giro d'Italia, Stage 16	UCI World Tour	Beñat Intxausti (ESP)	Italy	Ivrea
22 May	Giro d'Italia, Stage 17	UCI World Tour	Giovanni Visconti (ITA)	Italy	Vicenza
26 May	Giro d'Italia, Trofeo Super Team	UCI World Tour	(Note: The riders on the squad were Eros Capecchi, Juan José Cobo, Alex Dowsett, José Herrada, Beñat Intxausti, Vladimir Karpets, Pablo Lastras, Francisco Ventoso and Giovanni Visconti)	Italy	
14 June	Tour de Suisse, Stage 7	UCI World Tour	Rui Costa (POR)	Switzerland	La Punt
16 June	Tour de Suisse, Stage 9	UCI World Tour	Rui Costa (POR)	Switzerland	Flumserberg
16 June	Tour de Suisse, Overall	UCI World Tour	Rui Costa (POR)	Switzerland	
16 July	Tour de France, Stage 16	UCI World Tour	Rui Costa (POR)	France	Gap
19 July	Tour de France, Stage 19	UCI World Tour	Rui Costa (POR)	France	Le Grand-Bornand
20 July	Tour de France, Stage 20	UCI World Tour	Nairo Quintana (COL)	France	Annecy-Semnoz
21 July	Tour de France, Mountains classification	UCI World Tour	Nairo Quintana (COL)	France	
21 July	Tour de France, Young rider classification	UCI World Tour	Nairo Quintana (COL)	France	
11 August	Vuelta a Burgos, Stage 5	UCI Europe Tour	Nairo Quintana (COL)	Spain	Lagunas de Neila
11 August	Vuelta a Burgos, Overall	UCI Europe Tour	Nairo Quintana (COL)	Spain	
30 August	Tour du Poitou-Charentes, Stage 5	UCI Europe Tour	Jesús Herrada (ESP)	France	Poitiers
30 August	Tour du Poitou-Charentes, Young rider classification	UCI Europe Tour	Jesús Herrada (ESP)	France	
15 September	Vuelta a España, Points classification	UCI World Tour	Alejandro Valverde (ESP)	Spain	
22 September	Tour of Britain, Mountains classification	UCI Europe Tour	Ángel Madrazo (ESP)	Great Britain	
22 September	Tour of Britain, Sprints classification	UCI Europe Tour	Ángel Madrazo (ESP)	Great Britain	
14 October	Tour of Beijing, Stage 4	UCI World Tour	Beñat Intxausti (ESP)	China	Mentougou Miaofeng Mountain
15 October	Tour of Beijing, Overall	UCI World Tour	Beñat Intxausti (ESP)	China	
15 October	UCI World Tour, Teams classification	UCI World Tour	(Note: This award is calculated by adding the points earned by a team's top five riders in the individual standings. Those five riders were Alejandro Valverde, Nairo Quintana, Rui Costa, Beñat Intxausti, and Javier Moreno)		
