= 2012 Movistar Team season =

Season of a cycling team

2012 Movistar Team season
Manager	Eusebio Unzué
One-day victories	3
Stage race overall victories	6
Stage race stage victories	18
Previous season • Next season

The 2012 season for Movistar Team began in January at the Tour Down Under. As a UCI ProTeam, they were automatically invited and obligated to send a squad to every event in the UCI World Tour.

== 2012 roster ==
Ages as of 1 January 2012.

Rider	Date of birth
Andrey Amador (CRC)	29 August 1986 (aged 25)
Marvin Angarita (Note: Angarita joined the team on 1 August, as a stagiaire, from the Movistar Continental Team.) (COL)	11 April 1989 (aged 22)
David Arroyo (ESP)	7 January 1980 (aged 31)
Marzio Bruseghin (ITA)	15 June 1974 (aged 37)
Jonathan Castroviejo (ESP)	27 April 1987 (aged 24)
Juan José Cobo (ESP)	11 February 1981 (aged 30)
Rui Costa (POR)	5 October 1986 (aged 25)
Imanol Erviti (ESP)	15 November 1983 (aged 28)
Iván Gutiérrez (ESP)	27 November 1978 (aged 33)
Jesús Herrada (ESP)	26 July 1990 (aged 21)
José Herrada (ESP)	1 October 1985 (aged 26)
Beñat Intxausti (ESP)	20 March 1986 (aged 25)
Javier Iriarte (ESP)	11 November 1986 (aged 25)
Vladimir Karpets (RUS)	20 September 1980 (aged 31)

Rider	Date of birth
Vasil Kiryienka (BLR)	28 June 1981 (aged 30)
Ignatas Konovalovas (LTU)	8 December 1985 (aged 26)
Pablo Lastras (ESP)	20 January 1976 (aged 35)
David Lopez (ESP)	13 May 1981 (aged 30)
Angel Madrazo (ESP)	30 July 1988 (aged 23)
Javier Moreno (ESP)	18 July 1984 (aged 27)
Sergio Pardilla (ESP)	16 January 1984 (aged 27)
Rubén Plaza (ESP)	29 February 1980 (aged 31)
Nairo Quintana (COL)	4 February 1990 (aged 21)
José Joaquín Rojas (ESP)	8 June 1985 (aged 26)
Branislau Samoilau (BLR)	25 May 1985 (aged 26)
Enrique Sanz (ESP)	11 September 1989 (aged 22)
Alejandro Valverde (ESP)	25 April 1980 (aged 31)
Francisco Ventoso (ESP)	6 May 1982 (aged 29)
Giovanni Visconti (ITA)	13 January 1983 (aged 28)

Riders who joined the team for the 2012 season

Rider	2011 team
Giovanni Visconti	Farnese Vini–Neri Sottoli
Javier Moreno	Caja Rural
José Herrada	Caja Rural
Jonathan Castroviejo	Euskaltel–Euskadi
Nairo Quintana	Colombia es Pasión–Café de Colombia
Vladimir Karpets	Team Katusha
Alejandro Valverde	suspended (Caisse d'Epargne, 2010)
Juan José Cobo	Geox–TMC

Riders who left the team during or after the 2011 season

Rider	2012 team
Xavier Tondo	Deceased
Mauricio Soler	Still recovering from injuries sustained at the 2011 Tour de Suisse
José Vicente García	Retired
Carlos Oyarzun	Triciclo-USM
Luis Pasamontes	Movistar Continental Team
Francisco Pérez	Retired to compete in mountain biking

== Season victories ==
Date	Race	Competition	Rider	Country	Location
21 January	Tour Down Under, Stage 5	UCI World Tour	Alejandro Valverde (ESP)	Australia	Willunga
21 February	Vuelta a Andalucía, Stage 2	UCI Europe Tour	Alejandro Valverde (ESP)	Spain	Lucena
23 February	Vuelta a Andalucía, Overall	UCI Europe Tour	Alejandro Valverde (ESP)	Spain	
23 February	Vuelta a Andalucía, Points classification	UCI Europe Tour	Alejandro Valverde (ESP)	Spain	
23 February	Vuelta a Andalucía, Combination classification	UCI Europe Tour	Alejandro Valverde (ESP)	Spain	
3 March	Vuelta a Murcia, Stage 1	UCI Europe Tour	Nairo Quintana (COL)	Spain	Sierra Espuña
4 March	Vuelta a Murcia, Overall	UCI Europe Tour	Nairo Quintana (COL)	Spain	
4 March	Vuelta a Murcia, Points classification	UCI Europe Tour	Jonathan Castroviejo (ESP)	Spain	
4 March	Vuelta a Murcia, Teams classification	UCI Europe Tour	(Note: The riders on the squad were Juan José Cobo, Jonathan Castroviejo, Jesús Herrada, Vladimir Karpets, Sergio Pardilla, Rubén Plaza and Nairo Quintana)	Spain	
6 March	Paris–Nice, Stage 3	UCI World Tour	Alejandro Valverde (ESP)	France	Lac de Vassivière
2 April	Tour of the Basque Country, Stage 1	UCI World Tour	José Joaquín Rojas (ESP)	Spain	Güeñes
5 April	Circuit de la Sarthe, Stage 4	UCI Europe Tour	Francisco Ventoso (ESP)	France	Pré-en-Pail
8 April	Klasika Primavera	UCI Europe Tour	Giovanni Visconti (ITA)	Spain	Amorebieta
15 April	Vuelta a Castilla y León, Overall	UCI Europe Tour	Javier Moreno (ESP)	Spain	
15 April	Vuelta a Castilla y León, Points classification	UCI Europe Tour	Javier Moreno (ESP)	Spain	
15 April	Vuelta a Castilla y León, Combination classification	UCI Europe Tour	Javier Moreno (ESP)	Spain	
15 April	Vuelta a Castilla y León, Teams classification	UCI Europe Tour	(Note: The riders on the squad were Jonathan Castroviejo, David Arroyo, Sergio Pardilla, Vladimir Karpets, Javier Moreno, Juan José Cobo, Enrique Sanz and Rubén Plaza)	Spain	
28 April	Vuelta a Asturias, Stage 2a	UCI Europe Tour	Jesús Herrada (ESP)	Spain	Avilés
29 April	Vuelta a Asturias, Overall	UCI Europe Tour	Beñat Intxausti (ESP)	Spain	
29 April	Vuelta a Asturias, Points classification	UCI Europe Tour	Beñat Intxausti (ESP)	Spain	
29 April	Vuelta a Asturias, Teams classification	UCI Europe Tour	(Note: The riders on the squad were Javier Moreno, Jesús Herrada, Marzio Bruseghin, Iván Gutiérrez, Beñat Intxausti, Ignatas Konovalovas, David López, and Enrique Sanz)	Spain	
5 May	Vuelta a la Comunidad de Madrid, Stage 1	UCI Europe Tour	Jonathan Castroviejo (ESP)	Spain	Madrid
6 May	Vuelta a la Comunidad de Madrid, Sprints classification	UCI Europe Tour	Jonathan Castroviejo (ESP)	Spain	
6 May	Vuelta a la Comunidad de Madrid, Young rider classification	UCI Europe Tour	Nairo Quintana (COL)	Spain	
6 May	Vuelta a la Comunidad de Madrid, Teams classification	UCI Europe Tour	(Note: The riders on the squad were David Arroyo, Jonathan Castroviejo, Juan José Cobo, Iván Gutiérrez, Jesús Herrada, Ignatas Konovalovas, Ángel Madrazo, and Javier Moreno)	Spain	
14 May	Giro d'Italia, Stage 9	UCI World Tour	Francisco Ventoso (ESP)	Italy	Frosinone
19 May	Giro d'Italia, Stage 14	UCI World Tour	Andrey Amador (CRC)	Italy	Cervinia
9 June	Critérium du Dauphiné, Stage 6	UCI World Tour	Nairo Quintana (COL)	France	Morzine
10 June	Tour de Suisse, Stage 2	UCI World Tour	Rui Costa (POR)	Switzerland	Verbier
16 June	Route du Sud, Stage 3	UCI Europe Tour	Nairo Quintana (COL)	France	Arras-en-Lavedan
17 June	Tour de Suisse, Overall	UCI World Tour	Rui Costa (POR)	Switzerland	
17 June	Route du Sud, Overall	UCI Europe Tour	Nairo Quintana (COL)	France	
19 July	Tour de France, Stage 17	UCI World Tour	Alejandro Valverde (ESP)	France	Peyragudes
31 July	Circuito de Getxo	UCI Europe Tour	Giovanni Visconti (ITA)	Spain	Getxo
5 August	Vuelta a Burgos, Mountains classification	UCI Europe Tour	Sergio Pardilla (ESP)	Spain	
5 August	Vuelta a Burgos, Teams classification	UCI Europe Tour	(Note: The riders on the squad were David Arroyo, Marzio Bruseghin, David López, Ángel Madrazo, Javier Moreno, Sergio Pardilla, Rubén Plaza, and Giovanni Visconti)	Spain	
18 August	Vuelta a España, Stage 1	UCI World Tour	Team time trial (Note: The riders on the squad were Juan José Cobo, Jonathan Castroviejo, Imanol Erviti, Beñat Intxausti, Pablo Lastras, Javier Moreno, Nairo Quintana, José Joaquín Rojas, and Alejandro Valverde)	Spain	Pamplona
20 August	Vuelta a España, Stage 3	UCI World Tour	Alejandro Valverde (ESP)	Spain	Eibar–Arrate
24 August	Tour du Poitou-Charentes, Stage 5	UCI Europe Tour	Francisco Ventoso (ESP)	France	Poitiers
24 August	Tour du Poitou-Charentes, Teams classification	UCI Europe Tour	(Note: The riders on the squad were Rui Costa, Vasil Kiryienka, Vladimir Karpets, Francisco Ventoso, Rubén Plaza, Iván Gutiérrez, Javier Iriarte, and Enrique Sanz)	France	
25 August	Vuelta a España, Stage 8	UCI World Tour	Alejandro Valverde (ESP)	Andorra	Andorra–Collada de la Gallina
9 September	Vuelta a España, Points classification	UCI World Tour	Alejandro Valverde (ESP)	Spain	
9 September	Vuelta a España, Combination classification	UCI World Tour	Alejandro Valverde (ESP)	Spain	
9 September	Vuelta a España, Teams classification	UCI World Tour		Spain	
6 October	Giro dell'Emilia	UCI Europe Tour	Nairo Quintana (COL)	Italy	Bologna
