= 2010 Caisse d'Epargne season =

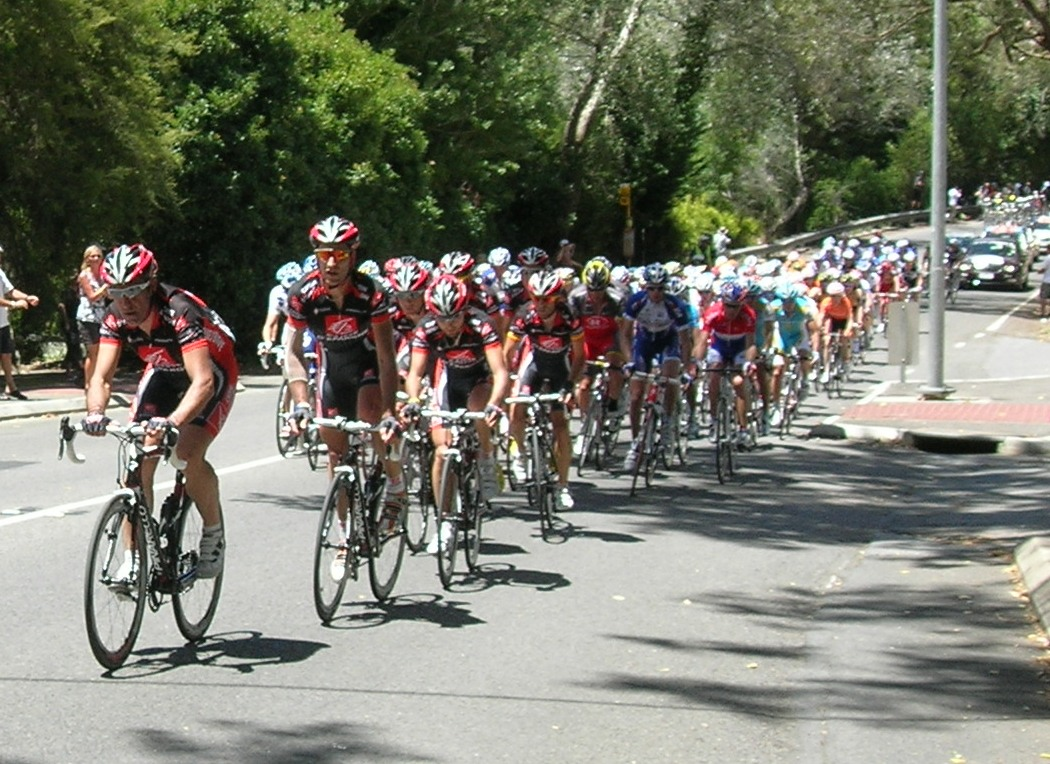

2010 Caisse d'Epargne season
Manager	Eusebio Unzué
One-day victories	2
Stage race overall victories	1 (Note: Prior to Alejandro Valverde's May 31 suspension, he won two stage race overall championships and three individual stages. These victories have been officially revoked.)
Stage race stage victories	6
Previous season • Next season

The 2010 season for the Caisse d'Epargne cycling team began in January with the Tour Down Under and ended in October at the Giro di Lombardia. As a UCI ProTour team, they were automatically invited and obliged to attend every event in the ProTour. The team's manager was Eusebio Unzué, who had led it since the Banesto days.

Though an offseason attempt to sign reigning Tour de France champion Alberto Contador was ultimately unsuccessful, the team added noteworthy riders for the 2010 season, including former Tour de France King of the Mountains Mauricio Soler and Marzio Bruseghin, who finished in the top ten in three Grand Tours over the previous two seasons.

The French banking group Caisse d'Epargne departed sponsorship after the 2010 season, preferring to sponsor the French Olympic teams. Spanish telecommunications company Telefónica, S.A. has stepped in to sponsor the team from 2011, giving the team the name of one its brands as it races as Team Movistar in 2011.

After lengthy legal proceedings, the team's top rider Alejandro Valverde was given a global two-year ban on May 31, backdated to January 1. Since he was, in essence, banned for all of the 2010 season, the results he obtained before the Court of Arbitration for Sport's decision came down were vacated and awarded to previously second-placed riders.

== 2010 roster ==
Ages as of January 1, 2010

Rider	Date of birth
Andrey Amador (CRC)	August 29, 1986 (aged 23)
David Arroyo (ESP)	January 7, 1980 (aged 29)
Marzio Bruseghin (ITA)	June 15, 1974 (aged 35)
Juan José Cobo (ESP)	February 11, 1981 (aged 28)
Rui Costa (POR)	May 10, 1986 (aged 23)
Arnaud Coyot (FRA)	October 6, 1980 (aged 29)
Mathieu Drujon (FRA)	February 1, 1983 (aged 26)
Imanol Erviti (ESP)	November 15, 1983 (aged 26)
José Vicente García (ESP)	August 4, 1972 (aged 37)
Iván Gutiérrez (ESP)	November 27, 1978 (aged 31)
Arnold Jeannesson (FRA)	January 16, 1986 (aged 23)
Vasil Kiryienka (BLR)	June 28, 1981 (aged 28)
Pablo Lastras (ESP)	January 20, 1976 (aged 33)

Rider	Date of birth
David López (ESP)	May 13, 1981 (aged 28)
Alberto Losada (ESP)	February 28, 1982 (aged 27)
Angel Madrazo (ESP)	July 30, 1988 (aged 21)
Christophe Moreau (FRA)	April 12, 1971 (aged 38)
Luis Pasamontes (ESP)	October 2, 1979 (aged 30)
Francisco Pérez (ESP)	July 22, 1978 (aged 31)
Mathieu Perget (FRA)	September 18, 1984 (aged 25)
Rubén Plaza (ESP)	February 29, 1980 (aged 29)
José Joaquín Rojas Gil (ESP)	June 5, 1985 (aged 24)
Luis León Sánchez (ESP)	December 24, 1983 (aged 26)
Mauricio Soler (COL)	January 14, 1983 (aged 26)
Rigoberto Urán (COL)	January 26, 1987 (aged 22)
Alejandro Valverde (Note: Valverde effectively left the team on May 31 after he was given a two-year global ban) (ESP)	April 25, 1980 (aged 29)
Xabier Zandio (ESP)	March 17, 1977 (aged 32)

Riders who joined the team for the 2010 season

Rider	2009 team
Marzio Bruseghin	Lampre–NGC
Juan José Cobo	Fuji–Servetto
Christophe Moreau	Agritubel
Rubén Plaza	Liberty Seguros
Mauricio Soler	Barloworld

Riders who left the team during or after the 2009 season

Rider	2010 team
Anthony Charteau	Bbox Bouygues Telecom
Daniel Moreno	Omega Pharma–Lotto
Óscar Pereiro	Astana
Marlon Pérez Arango	Free agent
Nicolas Portal	Team Sky
Joaquim Rodríguez	Team Katusha

== Stage races ==
The team's first race of the season was the Tour Down Under. They were noted to be sending a strong squad, including Valverde and former Tour Down Under champion Sánchez, who viewed the race as an important part of a 2010 race program meant to lead to victory in Paris–Nice. Valverde had a chance at victory in the undulating third stage of the race, holding the wheel of world champion Cadel Evans in a select leading group. A moment of hesitation when he was unsure if Evans was attacking for victory let Footon–Servetto–Fuji's Manuel Cardoso escape for the win. Two days later, the team got their first win of the season with Sánchez, as he, along with Valverde, Evans, and Peter Sagan formed a winning breakaway on the Old Willunga Hill Road that almost won sufficient time over race leader André Greipel to give Sánchez the overall lead. Sánchez finished the race the next day in second place overall. In February, Valverde won the Tour Méditerranéen overall without winning a stage, by virtue of his time gap over previous race leader Jussi Veikkanen on the final day's stage to Mont Faron. Later in the month, Sánchez won the individual time trial which closed out the Volta ao Algarve, finishing that event second overall.

== Grand Tours ==
=== Giro d'Italia ===
Caisse d'Epargne was one of 22 teams in the Giro d'Italia. The team was not competitive in the opening to the Giro in the Netherlands. They did not have riders contesting the finishes to either of the first two road race stages, and their best-placed rider in the overall standings before the transfer to Italy was Arroyo in 38th. Several team members were brought down in a big crash, which also claimed then-race leader Cadel Evans among its victims, in stage 3. Bruseghin, an outside favorite for overall success in the Giro, was thus put over eight minutes off the leading pace. The team's fortunes changed little in the stage 4 team time trial. They came in 18th, 2'21" off the pace of stage winners Liquigas–Doimo. In stage 6, a two-man breakaway survived to the finish of the stage. A depleted group sprint at the head of the peloton then fought for the remaining placings a minute behind the winner. Kiryienka took eighth in this stage.

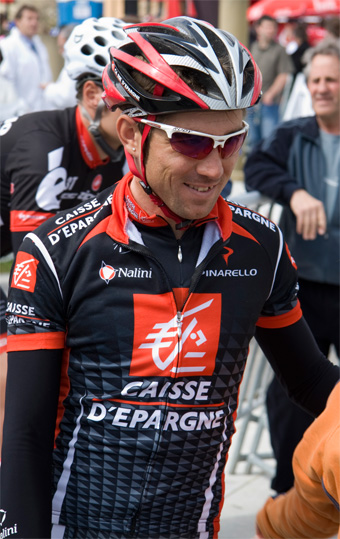
David Arroyo held the pink jersey for five days in the Giro.

Stage 7 was one of the major days in the Giro. The course was long and incorporated unpaved roads. The day on which the stage was run happened to have heavy rainfall, making for muddy riding in the unpaved sectors. After then-race leader Vincenzo Nibali sustained a mechanical issue which necessitated a bike change, Arroyo was one of a handful of riders to follow a timely attack from Alexander Vinokourov. Arroyo could not stay with the leaders (Vinokourov, Evans, and Damiano Cunego) but took fifth on the stage 12 seconds back of Evans. The result moved him up 11 places in the overall standings, from 25th to 14th. The Giro's 11th stage was another big one. An enormous breakaway group formed in this stage, near 50 riders at its most populous. Arroyo, Kiryienka, Amador, and Losada all made this selection. With Arroyo in 11th place in the overall standings, the other three worked hard to try to drive the break to its biggest advantage. Arroyo took eighth on the stage, 7 seconds back of the stage winner, as he did not contest the sprint for the stage win. His 13-minute time gap over the peloton moved him up to second in the overall standings.

Arroyo was a far stronger climber than Richie Porte, the man who had taken the race leadership on this stage. In the Giro's next mountain stage, stage 14 to Asolo incorporating Monte Grappa, Arroyo finished only 12th, over two minutes behind stage winner Vincenzo Nibali, but took the pink jersey as Porte was a further two minutes back in 24th. This was the first time the team, then known as Banesto, had held the pink jersey since Miguel Induráin won the race overall in 1993. In stage 15, the Monte Zoncolan stage, Arroyo finished nearly four minutes behind stage winner Ivan Basso, but he still retained the pink jersey because of how much time he had in hand to the race's overall favorites. Arroyo was another two minutes off the winning time in the climbing time trial to Plan de Corones in the next stage, but still held more than two minutes' advantage over Basso in second place after the stage.

The next two stages were flat and won by breakaways and sprinters, meaning they did not alter the overall standings. Arroyo was in the pink jersey with two minutes on Basso and three stages left to race, and was at this point entertaining the idea that he could win the Giro. In stage 19, Basso, his teammate Nibali, and Michele Scarponi easily dropped Arroyo on the climb of the Passo del Mortirolo. Basso then rode the descent very conservatively, with the other two needing to wait for him several times. Arroyo rode a very aggressive descent, and caught Carlos Sastre, John Gadret, Evans, and Vinokourov, who had been between him and the leading Italian trio. The five coalesced into a chase group on the day's final climb, to Aprica. Despite having only a few seconds' advantage at the start of a relatively easy climb, Basso's group gained time all throughout the climb and finished sufficiently ahead of Arroyo's to put the pink jersey on him. Arroyo stayed with Basso on the descent of the Passo di Gavia the next day instead of trying to regain the jersey. Though he conceded a little time in both the Passo del Tonale climb in stage 20 and the individual time trial in stage 21, Arroyo held on for second overall between Basso and Nibali. The squad finished third in the Trofeo Fast Team standings and 17th in the Trofeo Super Team.

=== Tour de France ===
Sánchez led the team's squad at the Tour de France, along with newly crowned Spanish road race champion Gutiérrez. Absent from the race were the newly suspended Valverde and Soler, who had planned to start but withdrew due to a knee injury sustained in the Critérium du Dauphiné. Rojas was in line to contest the sprint finish to stage 1, but he was caught behind in the massive crash that took place in the peloton just meters from the finish line, taking seventh on the day, two second behind the five riders who were able to steer clear of the crash and finish together. Stage 4 also ended with a sprint. Rojas was able to contest this one, but finished only seventh. He also finished in the top ten in stages 5 and 6, the latter of which involved Perget earning the day's combativity award. Perget again showed combativity in stage 7, finishing fifth in a three-man group that crossed the line 7 seconds ahead of the main peloton. Plaza was ninth in this stage.

After the first rest day, Caisse d'Epargne placed two riders in the top four of stage 9. Sánchez and Moreau were part of the day's breakaway, and stayed away (though they were joined by overall favorites Alberto Contador and Andy Schleck, who did not contest the finish). These results put the squad in first place in the teams classification, by a margin of 31 seconds over Team RadioShack and 35 seconds over Astana. Sánchez lost out on the stage win when Sandy Casar took an aggressive final turn to the finish line, which was situated just after a hairpin left turn. Sánchez did, however, gain the day's combativity award and move up to 8th overall. Astana rode in support of Contador's bid for a third Tour title and Team RadioShack had no overall contender (due to Lance Armstrong falling well out of contention after stage 8). Thus, the American team contested the team award with Caisse d'Epargne for the remainder of the race, making sure to mark one another in breakaways. The very next day, the teams supplied the two riders who contested the stage finish, with Team RadioShack's Sérgio Paulinho beating Kiryienka after Kiryienka rode the stage's concluding kilometer in an unstrategic fashion. Rojas took fourth in the sprint finish to stage 11, and fifth on stage 13 (though this sprint was for second place as Alexander Vinokourov won the day with a solo move). After having lost the team award for two days, they took it back after stage 14 when their top three riders finished 14th, 15th, and 16th to Team RadioShack's 11th, 17th, and 22nd, giving Caisse d'Epargne an eight-second lead. The next day, however, they lost the lead for good on a difficult mountain stage where Sánchez also dropped out of the top ten following a distant 30th-place finish, five minutes behind the stage winner and three minutes behind the race's top riders. The team did their best to remain combative, placing two riders in the breakaway in stage 16 to match RadioShack's representation, but the four-minute gap that faced them at that point was too much to overcome. Ultimately, the team left the Tour without any victories. They finished second to RadioShack in the teams classification, by a margin of nine minutes and 15 seconds. Sánchez was their highest-placed individual rider, in 11th place at a deficit of 14 minutes and 21 seconds to Tour champion Contador.

=== Vuelta a España ===
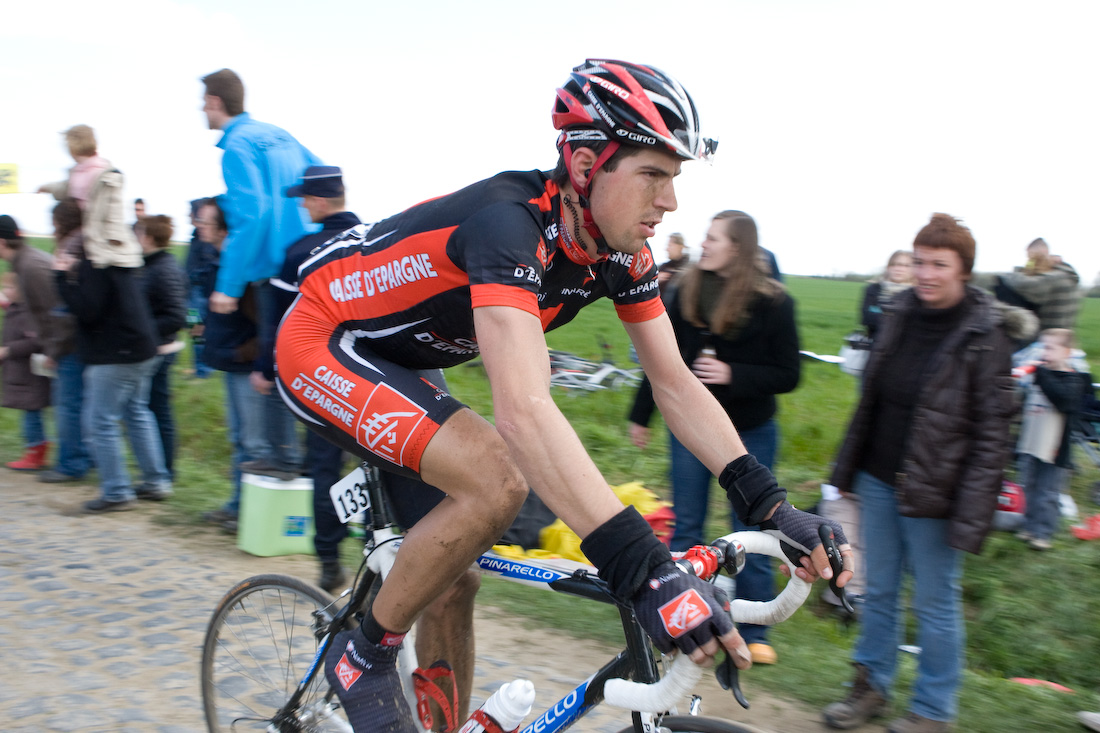
Imanol Erviti took the second of two consecutive stage wins for Caisse d'Epargne at the Vuelta a España.

Caisse d'Epargne came to the Vuelta a España with a squad composed of several riders who could conceivably lead it. Unzue stated that he was confident about his team's chances to secure a podium place in the race, and commented that Arroyo, Sánchez, Bruseghin, Plaza, or Urán could all potentially emerge as the squad's leader and protected rider.

The squad struggled in the stage 1 team time trial. Despite the presence of Spanish national time trial champion Sánchez, they could manage only 11th place, finishing with seven riders 25 seconds off Team HTC–Columbia's winning time. Plaza and Urán both finished near the front of the race in the hilly stage 4, with Plaza 12 seconds back of stage winner Igor Antón for ninth and Urán 19 back in tenth. This result moved Plaza into ninth overall. The overall standings mostly stayed the same until stage 8, the next mountain stage. While the stage victory went to David Moncoutié, a member of the morning breakaway, Bruseghin, Plaza, and Urán all finished near the top riders in the race. The result moved Plaza up to fifth overall and Bruseghin into the top ten, at eighth.

In stage 9, López made the morning breakaway and stayed with the front group through course's seven categorized climbs. He rode away from the last four who remained with him on the stage-concluding Alto de Revolcat and arrived in Alcoy six seconds ahead of Roman Kreuziger for the stage win. Omega Pharma–Lotto's Jean-Christophe Péraud had also made this escape and, being relatively highly placed at the beginning of the day, moved into fifth overall at the end of the day, knocking Plaza and Bruseghin down a place each to sixth and ninth respectively. The team got another win the next day from a breakaway. Erviti made the morning escape, and then soloed to victory by taking an aggressive descent down the Alto de Rat Penat, winning by 37 seconds over Cofidis' Romain Zingle. Stage 11 was another important stage for the overall standings, ending with a steep climb to Vallnord in Andorra. Antón won the stage, and Bruseghin, Urán, and Plaza finished in the top eleven on the day to occupy sixth through eighth in the new overall standings, giving the team many options going forward. All three, however, had bad days in stage 14, the next mountain stage. Plaza was 23rd, Urán 35th, and Bruseghin 99th, with only Plaza remaining in the top ten of the overall standings after the stage. Sánchez rode better, 17th on the day, to move up to 13th overall. Plaza faltered badly in the next stage, dropping six minutes to the race's elite riders on the Lagos de Covadonga climb, leaving Sánchez, now in 15th, as the team's best rider. Sánchez cracked the top ten after the individual time trial in Peñafiel in stage 17. He took fifth on the stage, and occupied tenth overall afterwards. He maintained that position through the conclusion of the race, as the team did not again come close to getting any victories. The squad finished second in the teams classification, 33 seconds behind Team Katusha.

== Season victories ==
Date	Race	Competition	Rider	Country	Location
January 23	Tour Down Under, Stage 5	UCI ProTour	Luis León Sánchez (ESP)	Australia	Willunga
February 10	Trofeo Deiá	UCI Europe Tour	Rui Costa (POR)	Spain	Mallorca
February 21	Volta ao Algarve, Stage 5	UCI Europe Tour	Luis León Sánchez (ESP)	Portugal	Portimão
April 6	Circuit Cycliste Sarthe, Stage 1	UCI Europe Tour	Luis León Sánchez (ESP)	France	Varades
April 9	Circuit Cycliste Sarthe, Overall	UCI Europe Tour	Luis León Sánchez (ESP)	France	
May 9	Four Days of Dunkirk, Points classification	UCI Europe Tour	José Joaquín Rojas (ESP)	France	
May 9	Four Days of Dunkirk, Youth classification	UCI Europe Tour	Rui Costa (POR)	France	
May 9	Four Days of Dunkirk, Teams classification	UCI Europe Tour	(Note: The riders on the squad were Rui Costa, Arnaud Coyot, Mathieu Drujon, Imanol Erviti, Angel Madrazo, Luis Pasamontes, Francisco Pérez, and José Joaquín Rojas)	France	
June 19	Tour de Suisse, Stage 8	UCI World Ranking	Rui Costa (POR)	Switzerland	Liestal
July 31	Clásica de San Sebastián	UCI World Ranking	Luis León Sánchez (ESP)	Spain	San Sebastián
September 5	Vuelta a España, Stage 9	UCI World Ranking	David López (ESP)	Spain	Alcoy
September 7	Vuelta a España, Stage 10	UCI World Ranking	Imanol Erviti (ESP)	Spain	Vilanova i la Geltrú

=== Victories originally obtained by Valverde but vacated ===
Date	Race	Competition	Country	Location
February 14	Tour Méditerranéen, Overall	UCI Europe Tour	France	
April 5	Tour of the Basque Country, Stage 1	UCI ProTour	Spain	Zierbena
April 6	Tour of the Basque Country, Stage 2	UCI ProTour	Spain	Viana
April 10	Tour of the Basque Country, Points classification	UCI ProTour	Spain	
May 2	Tour de Romandie, Stage 5	UCI ProTour	Switzerland	Sion
May 2	Tour de Romandie, Overall	UCI ProTour	Switzerland	
