= 2016 Movistar Team season =

Movistar Team
- 2016 season
- UCI code: MOV
- Status: UCI ProTeam
- Manager: Eusebio Unzué
- Main sponsor(s): Telefónica
- Based: Spain
- Bicycles: Canyon
- Groupset: Campagnolo

Season victories
- One-day races: 3
- Stage race overall: 8
- Stage race stages: 20
- Grand Tours: 1
- National Championships: 4
- Jersey

The 2016 season for Movistar Team began in January at the Tour de San Luis and Tour Down Under. As a UCI WorldTeam, they were automatically invited and obligated to send a squad to every event in the UCI World Tour.

== Team roster ==
As of 29 March 2016

Rider	Date of birth
Andrey Amador (CRC)	29 August 1986 (aged 29)
Winner Anacona (COL)	11 September 1988 (aged 27)
Jorge Arcas (ESP)	8 July 1992 (aged 23)
Carlos Betancur (COL)	13 October 1989 (aged 26)
Richard Carapaz (Note: Carapaz joined the team on 27 July as a stagiaire, from Lizarte.) (ECU)	29 May 1993 (aged 22)
Jonathan Castroviejo (ESP)	27 April 1987 (aged 28)
Alex Dowsett (GBR)	3 October 1988 (aged 27)
Imanol Erviti (ESP)	15 November 1983 (aged 32)
Rubén Fernández (ESP)	1 March 1991 (aged 25)
Jesús Herrada (ESP)	26 July 1990 (aged 25)
José Herrada (ESP)	1 October 1985 (aged 30)
Gorka Izagirre (ESP)	7 October 1987 (aged 28)
Ion Izagirre (ESP)	4 February 1989 (aged 27)
Juan José Lobato (ESP)	28 December 1988 (aged 27)

Rider	Date of birth
Adriano Malori (ITA)	28 January 1988 (aged 28)
Daniel Moreno (ESP)	5 September 1981 (aged 34)
Javier Moreno (ESP)	18 July 1984 (aged 31)
Nelson Oliveira (POR)	6 March 1989 (aged 27)
Antonio Pedrero (ESP)	23 October 1991 (aged 24)
Dayer Quintana (COL)	10 August 1992 (aged 23)
Nairo Quintana (COL)	4 February 1990 (aged 26)
José Joaquín Rojas (ESP)	8 June 1985 (aged 30)
Marc Soler (ESP)	22 November 1993 (aged 22)
Rory Sutherland (AUS)	8 February 1982 (aged 34)
Jasha Sütterlin (GER)	4 November 1992 (aged 23)
Alejandro Valverde (ESP)	25 April 1980 (aged 35)
Francisco Ventoso (ESP)	6 May 1982 (aged 33)
Giovanni Visconti (ITA)	13 January 1983 (aged 33)

Riders who joined the team for the 2016 season

Rider	2015 team
Jorge Arcas	neo-pro (Lizarte)
Carlos Betancur	AG2R La Mondiale
Daniel Moreno	Team Katusha
Nelson Oliveira	Lampre–Merida
Antonio Pedrero	neo-pro (Inteja–MMR Dominican Cycling Team)

Riders who left the team during or after the 2015 season

Rider	2016 team
Igor Anton	Team Dimension Data
Eros Capecchi	Astana
John Gadret	Retired
Beñat Intxausti	Team Sky
Pablo Lastras	Retired
Enrique Sanz	Southeast–Venezuela

== Season victories ==
Date	Race	Competition	Rider	Country	Location
24 January	Tour de San Luis, Overall	UCI America Tour	Dayer Quintana (COL)	Argentina	San Luis
24 January	Tour de San Luis, Teams classification	UCI America Tour	(Note: The riders on the squad were Adriano Malori, Daniel Moreno, Dayer Quintana, Nairo Quintana, Francisco Ventoso and Marc Soler)	Argentina	
5 February	Dubai Tour, Stage 3	UCI Asia Tour	Juan José Lobato (ESP)	United Arab Emirates	Hatta
21 February	Vuelta a Andalucía, Stage 5	UCI Europe Tour	Alejandro Valverde (ESP)	Spain	Estepona
21 February	Vuelta a Andalucía, Overall	UCI Europe Tour	Alejandro Valverde (ESP)	Spain	Estepona
21 February	Tour du Haut Var, Teams classification	UCI Europe Tour	(Note: The riders on the squad were José Herrada, Jasha Sütterlin, Gorka Izagirre, Jesús Herrada, Antonio Pedrero, Dayer Quintana, Marc Soler and Giovanni Visconti)	France	
13 March	Paris–Nice, Teams classification	UCI World Tour	(Note: The riders on the squad were Jon Izagirre, Imanol Erviti, Rubén Fernández, Jesús Herrada, José Herrada, Gorka Izagirre, Juan José Lobato and José Joaquín Rojas)	France	
27 March	Volta a Catalunya, Overall	UCI World Tour	Nairo Quintana (COL)	Spain	
2 April	GP Miguel Indurain	UCI Europe Tour	Jon Izagirre (ESP)	Spain	Estella-Lizarra
8 April	Circuit de la Sarthe, Stage 4	UCI Europe Tour	Juan José Lobato (ESP)	France	Arnage
10 April	Klasika Primavera	UCI Europe Tour	Giovanni Visconti (ITA)	Spain	Amorebieta
15 April	Vuelta a Castilla y León, Stage 1	UCI Europe Tour	Carlos Betancur (COL)	Portugal	Bragança
16 April	Vuelta a Castilla y León, Stage 2	UCI Europe Tour	Alejandro Valverde (ESP)	Spain	Fermoselle
17 April	Vuelta a Castilla y León, Stage 3	UCI Europe Tour	Alejandro Valverde (ESP)	Spain	Alto de Candelario
17 April	Vuelta a Castilla y León, Overall	UCI Europe Tour	Alejandro Valverde (ESP)	Spain	
17 April	Vuelta a Castilla y León, Points classification	UCI Europe Tour	Alejandro Valverde (ESP)	Spain	
20 April	La Flèche Wallonne	UCI World Tour	Alejandro Valverde (ESP)	Belgium	Huy
26 April	Tour de Romandie, Prologue	UCI World Tour	Jon Izagirre (ESP)	Switzerland	La Chaux-de-Fonds
28 April	Tour de Romandie, Stage 2	UCI World Tour	Nairo Quintana (COL)	Switzerland	Morgins
1 May	Tour de Romandie, Overall	UCI World Tour	Nairo Quintana (COL)	Switzerland	
1 May	Tour de Romandie, Teams classification	UCI World Tour	(Note: The riders on the squad were Nairo Quintana, Andrey Amador, Winner Anacona, Jesús Herrada, Gorka Izagirre, Jon Izagirre, Antonio Pedrero and José Joaquín Rojas)	Switzerland	
1 May	Vuelta a Asturias, Stage 2	UCI Europe Tour	Carlos Betancur (COL)	Spain	Pola de Lena
2 May	Vuelta a Asturias, Stage 3	UCI Europe Tour	Daniel Moreno (ESP)	Spain	Uría
2 May	Vuelta a Asturias, Points classification	UCI Europe Tour	Daniel Moreno (ESP)	Spain	
7 May	Vuelta a la Comunidad de Madrid, Stage 1	UCI Europe Tour	Juan José Lobato (ESP)	Spain	Las Rozas
8 May	Vuelta a la Comunidad de Madrid, Overall	UCI Europe Tour	Juan José Lobato (ESP)	Spain	
8 May	Vuelta a la Comunidad de Madrid, Points classification	UCI Europe Tour	Juan José Lobato (ESP)	Spain	
24 May	Giro d'Italia, Stage 16	UCI World Tour	Alejandro Valverde (ESP)	Italy	Andalo
7 June	Critérium du Dauphiné, Stage 2	UCI World Tour	Jesús Herrada (ESP)	France	Chalmazel-Jeansagnière
17 June	Route du Sud, Stage 3	UCI Europe Tour	Nairo Quintana (COL)	France	Albi
18 June	Route du Sud, Stage 4	UCI Europe Tour	Marc Soler (ESP)	France	Val d'Azur Couraduque
18 June	Tour de Suisse, Stage 8	UCI World Tour	Jon Izagirre (ESP)	Switzerland	Davos
19 June	Route du Sud, Overall	UCI Europe Tour	Nairo Quintana (COL)	France	
19 June	Route du Sud, Young rider classification	UCI Europe Tour	Marc Soler (ESP)	France	
19 June	Route du Sud, Teams classification	UCI Europe Tour	(Note: The riders on the squad were Nairo Quintana, José Herrada, Imanol Erviti, Javier Moreno, Dayer Quintana, José Joaquín Rojas, Rory Sutherland and Marc Soler)	France	
18 July	Tour de Pologne, Stage 7	UCI World Tour	Alex Dowsett (GBR)	Poland	Kraków
23 July	Tour de France, Stage 20	UCI World Tour	Jon Izagirre (ESP)	France	Morzine
24 July	Tour de France, Teams classification	UCI World Tour	(Note: The riders on the squad were Nairo Quintana, Alejandro Valverde, Winner Anacona, Imanol Erviti, Jesús Herrada, Gorka Izagirre, Jon Izagirre, Daniel Moreno and Nelson Oliveira)	France	
6 August	Vuelta a Burgos, Teams classification	UCI Europe Tour	(Note: The riders on the squad were Alex Dowsett, Rubén Fernández, José Herrada, Javier Moreno, Gorka Izagirre, José Joaquín Rojas, Rory Sutherland and Giovanni Visconti)	Spain	
29 August	Vuelta a España, Stage 10	UCI World Tour	Nairo Quintana (COL)	Spain	Lagos de Covadonga
11 September	Vuelta a España, Overall	UCI World Tour	Nairo Quintana (COL)	Spain	
11 September	Vuelta a España, Combination classification	UCI World Tour	Nairo Quintana (COL)	Spain	
20 September	Giro di Toscana, Stage 1	UCI Europe Tour	Giovanni Visconti (ITA)	Italy	Montecatini Terme

== National, Continental and World champions 2016 ==
Date	Discipline	Jersey	Rider	Country	Location
23 June	British National Time Trial Champion		Alex Dowsett (GBR)	United Kingdom	Stockton-on-Tees
23 June	Spanish National Time Trial Champion		Jon Izagirre (ESP)	Spain	Ibi
24 June	Portuguese National Time Trial Champion		Nelson Oliveira (POR)	Portugal	Braga
25 June	Spanish National Road Race Champion		José Joaquín Rojas (ESP)	Spain	Cocentaina
15 September	European Time Trial Champion		Jonathan Castroviejo (ESP)	France	Plumelec
