= 2020 Movistar Team (men's team) season =

Cycling team season

Movistar Team
- 2020 season
- UCI code: MOV
- Status: UCI WorldTeam
- Manager: Eusebio Unzué
- Main sponsor(s): Telefónica
- Based: Spain
- Bicycles: Canyon
- Groupset: Campagnolo

Season victories
- One-day races: 1
- Stage race stages: 1
- Most wins: Marc Soler (2)
- Jersey

The 2020 season for Movistar cycling team began in January at the Tour Down Under.

== Team roster ==
As of 15 May 2020.

| Rider | Date of birth |
|---|---|
| Juan Diego Alba (COL) | 11 September 1997 (aged 22) |
| Jorge Arcas (ESP) | 8 July 1992 (aged 27) |
| Carlos Betancur (COL) | 13 October 1989 (aged 30) |
| Héctor Carretero (ESP) | 28 May 1995 (aged 24) |
| Dario Cataldo (ITA) | 17 March 1985 (aged 34) |
| Gabriel Cullaigh (GBR) | 8 April 1996 (aged 23) |
| Iñigo Elosegui (ESP) | 6 March 1998 (aged 21) |
| Imanol Erviti (ESP) | 15 November 1983 (aged 36) |
| Juri Hollmann (GER) | 30 August 1999 (aged 20) |
| Johan Jacobs (SUI) | 1 March 1997 (aged 22) |
| Matteo Jorgenson (USA) | 1 July 1999 (aged 20) |
| Enric Mas (ESP) | 7 January 1995 (aged 24) |
| Lluís Mas (ESP) | 15 October 1989 (aged 30) |
| Sebastián Mora (ESP) | 19 February 1988 (aged 31) |

| Rider | Date of birth |
|---|---|
| Mathias Norsgaard (DEN) | 5 May 1997 (aged 22) |
| Nelson Oliveira (POR) | 6 March 1989 (aged 30) |
| Antonio Pedrero (ESP) | 23 October 1991 (aged 28) |
| Eduard Prades (ESP) | 9 August 1987 (aged 32) |
| Jürgen Roelandts (BEL) | 2 July 1985 (aged 34) |
| José Joaquín Rojas (ESP) | 8 June 1985 (aged 34) |
| Einer Rubio (COL) | 22 February 1998 (aged 21) |
| Sergio Samitier (ESP) | 31 August 1995 (aged 24) |
| Eduardo Sepúlveda (ARG) | 13 June 1991 (aged 28) |
| Marc Soler (ESP) | 22 November 1993 (aged 26) |
| Albert Torres (ESP) | 26 April 1990 (aged 29) |
| Alejandro Valverde (ESP) | 25 April 1980 (aged 39) |
| Carlos Verona (ESP) | 4 November 1992 (aged 27) |
| Davide Villella (ITA) | 27 June 1991 (aged 28) |

Riders who joined the team for the 2020 season

| Rider | 2019 team |
|---|---|
| Juan Diego Alba | neo-pro (Coldeportes–Zenú) |
| Dario Cataldo | Astana |
| Gabriel Cullaigh | neo-pro (Team Wiggins Le Col) |
| Iñigo Elosegui | neo-pro (Lizarte) |
| Juri Hollmann | neo-pro (Heizomat–rad-net.de) |
| Johan Jacobs | neo-pro |
| Matteo Jorgenson | neo-pro |
| Enric Mas | Deceuninck–Quick-Step |
| Sebastián Mora | Caja Rural–Seguros RGA |
| Mathias Norsgaard | Riwal Readynez |
| Einer Rubio | neo-pro |
| Sergio Samitier | Euskadi–Murias |
| Albert Torres | neo-pro |
| Davide Villella | Astana |

Riders who left the team during or after the 2019 season

| Rider | 2020 team |
|---|---|
| Andrey Amador | Team Ineos |
| Winner Anacona | Arkéa–Samsic |
| Carlos Barbero | NTT Pro Cycling |
| Daniele Bennati | Retired |
| Richard Carapaz | Team Ineos |
| Jaime Castrillo | Equipo Kern Pharma |
| Rubén Fernández | Fundación–Orbea |
| Mikel Landa | Bahrain–McLaren |
| Nairo Quintana | Arkéa–Samsic |
| Jasha Sutterlin | Team Sunweb |
| Rafael Valls | Bahrain–McLaren |

== Season victories ==
| Date | Race | Competition | Rider | Country | Location |
|---|---|---|---|---|---|
| 1 February | Pollença - Andratx | UCI Europe Tour | Marc Soler (ESP) | Spain | Andratx |
| 2 February | Vuelta a San Juan, Teams classification | UCI America Tour; UCI ProSeries | (Note: The riders in the squad were Carlos Betancur, Iñigo Elosegui, Johan Jacobs, Sebastián Mora, Nelson Oliveira, and Eduardo Sepúlveda.) | Argentina | |
| 14 September | Tirreno–Adriatico, Mountains classification | UCI World Tour | Héctor Carretero (ESP) | Italy | |
| 20 September | Tour de France, Teams classification | UCI World Tour | (Note: The riders in the squad were Dario Cataldo, Imanol Erviti, Enric Mas, Nelson Oliveira, José Joaquín Rojas, Marc Soler, Alejandro Valverde, and Carlos Verona.) | France | |
| 21 October | Vuelta a España, Stage 2 | UCI World Tour | Marc Soler (ESP) | Spain | Lekunberri |
| 8 November | Vuelta a España, Young rider classification | UCI World Tour | Enric Mas (ESP) | Spain | |
| 8 November | Vuelta a España, Teams classification | UCI World Tour | (Note: The riders in the squad were Jorge Arcas, Imanol Erviti, Enric Mas, Nelson Oliveira, José Joaquín Rojas, Marc Soler, Alejandro Valverde, and Carlos Verona.) | Spain | |

== National, Continental and World champions ==
| Date | Discipline | Jersey | Rider | Country | Location |
