= 2013 Tour of Beijing =

2013 UCI World Tour, race 29 of 29

Race details
- Dates: 11–15 October 2013
- Stages: 5
- Distance: 835.5 km (519.2 mi)

Results
Jersey awarded to the overall winner	Winner	Beñat Intxausti (ESP)	(Movistar Team)
	Second	Dan Martin (IRL)	(Garmin–Sharp)
	Third	David López · (ESP)	(Team Sky)

The 2013 Tour of Beijing was the third running of the Tour of Beijing stage race. It started on 11 October in Beijing's Shunyi District and ended on 15 October at the Bird's Nest Piazza after five stages. It was the 29th and final race of the 2013 UCI World Tour season. Beñat Intxausti of the Movistar Team won the race after his mountain–top–finish victory on stage 4.

== Schedule ==
Stage	Date	Course	Distance	Type	Winner
1	11 October	Shunyi to Huairou Studio City	190.5 km (118.4 mi)	Flat stage	Thor Hushovd (NOR)
2	12 October	Huairou Studio City to Yanqing	201.5 km (125.2 mi)	Flat stage	Nacer Bouhanni (FRA)
3	13 October	Yanqing to Qianjiandian	176.0 km (109.4 mi)	Medium mountain stage	Nacer Bouhanni (FRA)
4	14 October	Yanqing to Mentougou Miaofeng Mountain	150.5 km (93.5 mi)	Mountain stage	Beñat Intxausti (ESP)
5	15 October	Tiananmen Square to Bird's Nest Piazza	117.0 km (73 mi)	Flat stage	Luka Mezgec (SLO)

== Participating teams ==
As the Tour of Beijing is a UCI World Tour event, all nineteen UCI ProTeams were invited automatically and obligated to send a squad. In addition the race organisers awarded a wildcard place to the Champion System team.

The twenty teams that competed in the race were:

- Ag2r–La Mondiale
- Argos–Shimano
- Astana
- Belkin Pro Cycling
- BMC Racing Team
- Cannondale
- Euskaltel–Euskadi
- FDJ.fr
- Garmin–Sharp
- Team Katusha
- Lampre–Merida
- Lotto–Belisol
- Movistar Team
- Omega Pharma–Quick-Step
- Orica–GreenEDGE
- RadioShack–Leopard
- Saxo–Tinkoff
- Team Sky
- Vacansoleil–DCM
- Champion System

== Stages ==
=== Stage 1 ===
11 October 2013 — Shunyi to Huairou Studio City, 190.5 km (118.4 mi)

Stage 1 Result

	Rider	Team	Time
1	Thor Hushovd (NOR)	BMC Racing Team	4h 20' 34"
2	Luka Mezgec (SLO)	Argos–Shimano	s.t.
3	Nikolas Maes (BEL)	Omega Pharma–Quick-Step	s.t.
4	Alessandro Petacchi (ITA)	Omega Pharma–Quick-Step	s.t.
5	Michael Matthews (AUS)	Orica–GreenEDGE	s.t.
6	Enrique Sanz (ESP)	Movistar Team	s.t.
7	Rudiger Selig (GER)	Team Katusha	s.t.
8	Nacer Bouhanni (FRA)	FDJ.fr	s.t.
9	Jonas Vangenechten (BEL)	Lotto–Belisol	s.t.
10	Roberto Ferrari (ITA)	Lampre–Merida	s.t.

General Classification after Stage 1

	Rider	Team	Time
1	Thor Hushovd (NOR)	BMC Racing Team	4h 20' 34"
2	Willem Wauters (BEL)	Vacansoleil–DCM	+ 3"
3	Luka Mezgec (SLO)	Argos–Shimano	+ 4"
4	Nikolas Maes (BEL)	Omega Pharma–Quick-Step	+ 6"
5	Ryota Nishizono (JPN)	Champion System	+ 9"
6	Alessandro Petacchi (ITA)	Omega Pharma–Quick-Step	+ 10"
7	Michael Matthews (AUS)	Orica–GreenEDGE	+ 10"
8	Enrique Sanz (ESP)	Movistar Team	+ 10"
9	Rüdiger Selig (GER)	Team Katusha	+ 10"
10	Nacer Bouhanni (FRA)	FDJ.fr	+ 10"

=== Stage 2 ===
12 October 2013 — Huairou Studio City to Yanqing, 201.5 km (125.2 mi)

Stage 2 Result

	Rider	Team	Time
1	Nacer Bouhanni (FRA)	FDJ.fr	4h 59' 49"
2	Roberto Ferrari (ITA)	Lampre–Merida	s.t.
3	Mitchell Docker (AUS)	Orica–GreenEDGE	s.t.
4	Matti Breschel (DEN)	Saxo–Tinkoff	s.t.
5	Alessandro Petacchi (ITA)	Omega Pharma–Quick-Step	s.t.
6	Barry Markus (NED)	Vacansoleil–DCM	s.t.
7	Jonas Vangenechten (BEL)	Lotto–Belisol	s.t.
8	Steele Von Hoff (AUS)	Garmin–Sharp	s.t.
9	Luka Mezgec (SLO)	Argos–Shimano	s.t.
10	Elia Viviani (ITA)	Cannondale	s.t.

General Classification after Stage 2

	Rider	Team	Time
1	Nacer Bouhanni (FRA)	FDJ.fr	9h 20' 13"
2	Thor Hushovd (NOR)	BMC Racing Team	+ 0"
3	Maxime Bouet (FRA)	Ag2r–La Mondiale	+ 1"
4	Willem Wauters (BEL)	Vacansoleil–DCM	+ 3"
5	Luka Mezgec (SLO)	Argos–Shimano	+ 4"
6	Roberto Ferrari (ITA)	Lampre–Merida	+ 4"
7	Chad Beyer (USA)	Champion System	+ 5"
8	Nikolas Maes (BEL)	Omega Pharma–Quick-Step	+ 6"
9	Mitchell Docker (AUS)	Orica–GreenEDGE	+ 6"
10	Olivier Kaisen (BEL)	Lotto–Belisol	+ 7"

=== Stage 3 ===
13 October 2013 — Yanqing to Qianjiandian, 176.0 km (109.4 mi)

Stage 3 Result

	Rider	Team	Time
1	Nacer Bouhanni (FRA)	FDJ.fr	4h 08' 15"
2	Michael Matthews (AUS)	Orica–GreenEDGE	s.t.
3	Alexey Tsatevich (RUS)	Team Katusha	s.t.
4	Elia Viviani (ITA)	Cannondale	s.t.
5	Martin Kohler (SWI)	BMC Racing Team	s.t.
6	Borut Božič (SLO)	Astana	s.t.
7	Tosh Van der Sande (BEL)	Lotto–Belisol	s.t.
8	Jesús Herrada (ESP)	Movistar Team	s.t.
9	Romain Bardet (FRA)	Ag2r–La Mondiale	s.t.
10	Matti Breschel (DEN)	Saxo–Tinkoff	s.t.

General Classification after Stage 3

	Rider	Team	Time
1	Nacer Bouhanni (FRA)	FDJ.fr	13h 28' 18"
2	Michael Matthews (AUS)	Orica–GreenEDGE	+ 11"
3	Maxime Bouet (FRA)	Ag2r–La Mondiale	+ 11"
4	Alexey Tsatevich (RUS)	Team Katusha	+ 16"
5	Nikolas Maes (BEL)	Omega Pharma–Quick-Step	+ 16"
6	Matti Breschel (DEN)	Saxo–Tinkoff	+ 18"
7	Rui Costa (POR)	Movistar Team	+ 19"
8	Beñat Intxausti (ESP)	Movistar Team	+ 19"
9	Ryota Nishizono (JPN)	Champion System	+ 19"
10	Alessandro Petacchi (ITA)	Omega Pharma–Quick-Step	+ 20"

=== Stage 4 ===
14 October 2013 — Yanqing to Mentougou Miaofeng Mountain, 150.5 km (93.5 mi)

Stage 4 Result

	Rider	Team	Time
1	Beñat Intxausti (ESP)	Movistar Team	3h 43' 25"
2	Dan Martin (IRL)	Garmin–Sharp	+ 3"
3	David López (ESP)	Team Sky	+ 4"
4	Rui Costa (POR)	Movistar Team	+ 6"
5	Romain Bardet (FRA)	Ag2r–La Mondiale	+ 11"
6	Tony Martin (GER)	Omega Pharma–Quick-Step	+ 11"
7	Jan Bakelants (BEL)	RadioShack–Leopard	+ 13"
8	Robert Gesink (NED)	Belkin Pro Cycling	+ 13"
9	Ivan Basso (ITA)	Cannondale	+ 13"
10	Mathias Frank (SWI)	BMC Racing Team	+ 18"

General Classification after Stage 4

	Rider	Team	Time
1	Beñat Intxausti (ESP)	Movistar Team	17h 11' 50"
2	Dan Martin (IRL)	Garmin–Sharp	+ 10"
3	David López (ESP)	Team Sky	+ 13"
4	Rui Costa (POR)	Movistar Team	+ 18"
5	Romain Bardet (FRA)	Ag2r–La Mondiale	+ 24"
6	Tony Martin (GER)	Omega Pharma–Quick-Step	+ 24"
7	Jan Bakelants (BEL)	RadioShack–Leopard	+ 26"
8	Robert Gesink (NED)	Belkin Pro Cycling	+ 26"
9	Ivan Basso (ITA)	Cannondale	+ 26"
10	Garikoitz Bravo (ESP)	Euskaltel–Euskadi	+ 31"

=== Stage 5 ===
15 October 2013 — Tiananmen Square to Bird's Nest Piazza, 117.0 km (72.7 mi)

Stage 5 Result

	Rider	Team	Time
1	Luka Mezgec (SLO)	Argos–Shimano	2h 23' 56"
2	Nacer Bouhanni (FRA)	FDJ.fr	s.t.
3	Moreno Hofland (NED)	Belkin Pro Cycling	s.t.
4	Matti Breschel (DEN)	Saxo–Tinkoff	s.t.
5	Roberto Ferrari (ITA)	Lampre–Merida	s.t.
6	Alexey Tsatevich (RUS)	Team Katusha	s.t.
7	Alessandro Petacchi (ITA)	Omega Pharma–Quick-Step	s.t.
8	Rüdiger Selig (GER)	Team Katusha	s.t.
9	Yauheni Hutarovich (BLR)	Ag2r–La Mondiale	s.t.
10	Bernhard Eisel (AUT)	Team Sky	s.t.

General Classification after Stage 5

	Rider	Team	Time
1	Beñat Intxausti (ESP)	Movistar Team	19h 35' 46"
2	Dan Martin (IRL)	Garmin–Sharp	+ 10"
3	David López (ESP)	Team Sky	+ 13"
4	Rui Costa (POR)	Movistar Team	+ 18"
5	Romain Bardet (FRA)	Ag2r–La Mondiale	+ 24"
6	Tony Martin (GER)	Omega Pharma–Quick-Step	+ 24"
7	Jan Bakelants (BEL)	RadioShack–Leopard	+ 26"
8	Robert Gesink (NED)	Belkin Pro Cycling	+ 26"
9	Ivan Basso (ITA)	Cannondale	+ 26"
10	Garikoitz Bravo (ESP)	Euskaltel–Euskadi	+ 31"

== Classification leadership table ==
Stage	Winner	General classification	Mountains classification	Points classification	Young rider classification	Team Classification
1	Thor Hushovd	Thor Hushovd	not awarded	Thor Hushovd	Willem Wauters	Team Katusha
2	Nacer Bouhanni	Nacer Bouhanni	Thomas De Gendt	Nacer Bouhanni	Nacer Bouhanni	Team Katusha
3	Nacer Bouhanni	Nacer Bouhanni	Damiano Caruso	Nacer Bouhanni	Nacer Bouhanni	BMC Racing Team
4	Beñat Intxausti	Beñat Intxausti	Damiano Caruso	Nacer Bouhanni	Romain Bardet	Movistar Team
5	Luka Mezgec	Beñat Intxausti	Damiano Caruso	Nacer Bouhanni	Romain Bardet	Movistar Team
Final		Beñat Intxausti	Damiano Caruso	Nacer Bouhanni	Romain Bardet	Movistar Team
