= 2016 Clásica de Almería =

Race details
- Dates: 14 February 2016
- Stages: 1
- Distance: 21 km (13.05 mi)
- Winning time: 28' 29"

Results
| | Winner | Leigh Howard (AUS) |
| | Second | Alexey Tsatevich (RUS) |
| | Third | Aleksejs Saramotins (LAT) |

The 2016 Clásica de Almería was the 31st edition of the Clásica de Almería cycle race and was held on 14 February 2016. The race, originally intended to be 184 km (114 mi) but cut short due to strong winds, started in Almería and finished in Roquetas de Mar. The race was won by Leigh Howard.

== General classification ==
Final general classification

| Rank | Rider | Time |
|---|---|---|
| 1 | Leigh Howard (AUS) | 28' 29" |
| 2 | Alexey Tsatevich (RUS) | + 0" |
| 3 | Aleksejs Saramotins (LAT) | + 0" |
| 4 | Bryan Coquard (FRA) | + 5" |
| 5 | Nacer Bouhanni (FRA) | + 5" |
| 6 | Raymond Kreder (NED) | + 5" |
| 7 | Paweł Franczak (POL) | + 5" |
| 8 | Roman Maikin (RUS) | + 8" |
| 9 | Eryk Latoń (POL) | + 8" |
| 10 | José Joaquín Rojas (ESP) | + 11" |
