= Juan Carlos Unzué =

Spanish footballer (born 1967)

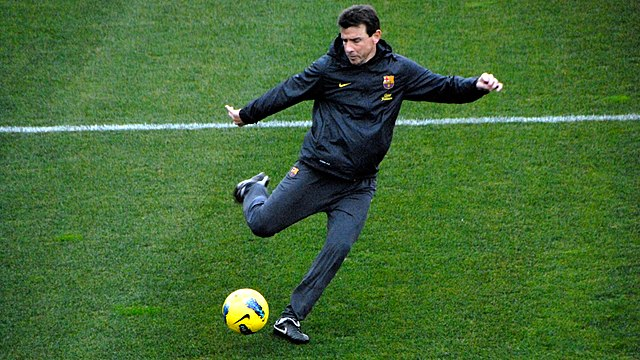
- Unzué in 2012

Personal information
- Full name: Juan Carlos Unzué Labiano
- Date of birth: 22 April 1967 (age 59)
- Place of birth: Pamplona, Spain
- Height: 1.78 m (5 ft 10 in)
- Position: Goalkeeper

Youth career
- Berriozar
- Colegio San Agustín
- 1982–1984: Osasuna

Senior career*
Years	Team	Apps	(Gls)
1984–1985	Osasuna B	2	(0)
1985–1988	Osasuna	15	(0)
1988–1990	Barcelona	5	(0)
1990–1997	Sevilla	222	(0)
1997–1999	Tenerife	35	(0)
1999–2001	Oviedo	0	(0)
2001–2003	Osasuna	41	(0)
Total		320	(0)

International career
1985	Spain U18	2	(0)
1985	Spain U19	1	(0)
1985	Spain U20	6	(0)
1985–1989	Spain U21	16	(0)
2000–2001	Basque Country	2	(0)

Managerial career
- 2003–2010: Barcelona (goalkeeping coach)
- 2010–2011: Numancia
- 2012: Racing Santander
- 2013–2014: Celta (assistant)
- 2014–2017: Barcelona (assistant)
- 2017–2018: Celta
- 2019: Girona
- * Club domestic league appearances and goals

Juan Carlos Unzué Labiano (born 22 April 1967) is a Spanish football manager and former player who played as a goalkeeper.

As a player, he represented mostly Sevilla, for which he appeared in nearly 300 official games. He also spent two years with Barcelona, and played 318 La Liga matches in 17 seasons.

After retiring, Unzué went on to work extensively as a goalkeeper coach and a manager.

== Playing career ==
Born in Pamplona, Unzué came through the ranks of hometown club Osasuna, but could not break into the first team. More of the same happened after he signed with La Liga giants Barcelona in 1988, as he was barred by Andoni Zubizarreta.

Joining Sevilla for 1990–91, Unzué blossomed as a top-flight player, rarely missing a match in his first five years. As the Andalusians were relegated at the end of the 1996–97 campaign, he moved to Tenerife for a further two seasons.

After two years at Real Oviedo as backup to local Esteban, his input consisting of seven Copa del Rey appearances, Unzué returned to his first club in summer 2001, being the starter in his debut season and second choice in the second. He retired from the game in June 2003 at age 36, after having helped his team reach the semi-finals of the domestic cup.

== Coaching career ==
Unzué returned to the Camp Nou immediately after retiring, as Frank Rijkaard's goalkeeping coach. After the Dutchman left, he retained his position under Pep Guardiola.

On 17 June 2010, after five years with Barcelona, Unzué had his first head coach experience, joining Segunda División team Numancia. One year later, he returned to his previous position, replacing Carles Busquets.

On 21 June 2012, Unzué was presented as Racing de Santander manager. On 13 August, however, he was dismissed following disagreements with the board of directors over the duration of his contract, and became Luis Enrique's assistant at Celta de Vigo the following 13 June.

Unzué returned to Barcelona on 15 July 2014, remaining as Luis Enrique's assistant. On 28 May 2017, he returned to managerial duties after being appointed at the helm of Celta for two seasons.

On 19 May 2018, after finishing in a disappointing 13th position, Unzué left Balaídos. On 13 June 2019, after more than a year without a club, he signed with recently relegated side Girona, being relieved of his duties on 21 October.

== Personal life ==
Unzué's son, Jesús (born 1993), is also a footballer and a goalkeeper. He was a member of the Barcelona Juvenil squad which won the league and cup in 2011, but was unable to make the breakthrough to the professional level and moved on to local clubs such as Gavà and Júpiter.

Unzué's older son, Aitor, played as a midfielder in Tercera División (also with Gavà), and his niece Marta represented Barcelona. A keen cyclist in his spare time, he came from a family which was heavily involved in cycle racing: his brother Eusebio managed the Movistar Team, whilst his nephew Enrique Sanz was a racing cyclist.

In February 2020, Unzué was diagnosed with amyotrophic lateral sclerosis. On 18 June, one day before the league game between Sevilla and Barcelona in Seville and three days ahead of the International ALS/MND day, he made his condition public at a special press conference held at the Camp Nou.

== Managerial statistics ==
As of 20 October 2019

Managerial record by team and tenure
Team	Nat	From	To	Record								Ref
Team	Nat	From	To	G	W	D	L	GF	GA	GD	Win %	Ref
Numancia	(Spain)	17 June 2010	23 June 2011	43	17	6	20	65	64	+1	39.53	
Racing Santander	(Spain)	21 June 2012	13 August 2012	0	0	0	0	0	0	+0	—	
Celta	(Spain)	28 May 2017	20 May 2018	42	15	11	16	63	67	−4	35.71	
Girona	(Spain)	13 June 2019	21 October 2019	12	5	1	6	15	16	−1	41.67	
Total				97	37	18	42	143	147	−4	38.14	—

== Honours ==
Barcelona

- Copa del Rey: 1989–90
- UEFA Cup Winners' Cup: 1988–89

Spain U20

- FIFA U-20 World Cup runner-up: 1985
