= 2013 Tour of Belgium =

2013 UCI Europe Tour

Race details
- Dates: 22—26 May
- Stages: 5
- Distance: 730.1 km (453.7 mi)

Results
Jersey awarded to the overall winner	Winner	Tony Martin (GER)	(Omega Pharma–Quick-Step)
	Second	Luis León Sánchez (ESP)	(Blanco Pro Cycling)
	Third	Philippe Gilbert (BEL)	(BMC Racing Team)
Jersey awarded to the points classification winner	Points	André Greipel (GER)	(Lotto–Belisol)
Jersey awarded to the youth classification winner	Youth	Tom Dumoulin (NED)	(Argos–Shimano)
Jersey awarded to the combativity classification winner	Combativity	Laurens De Vreese (BEL)	(Topsport Vlaanderen–Baloise)
	Team	Omega Pharma–Quick-Step	

The 2013 Tour of Belgium was the 83rd edition of the Tour of Belgium cycling stage race. It took place from 22 May to 26 May 2013 in Belgium. The race was a part of the UCI Europe Tour.

== Schedule ==
Stage	Route	Distance	Date	Winner
1	Lochristi to Knokke-Heist	194.2 km (120.7 mi)	Wednesday, May 22	André Greipel (GER)
2	Knokke-Heist to Ninove	181 km (112.5 mi)	Thursday, May 23	André Greipel (GER)
3	Beveren to Beveren	15 km (9.3 mi)	Friday, May 24	Tony Martin (GER)
4	Eau d'Heure lakes to Eau d'Heure lakes	164.3 km (102.1 mi)	Saturday, May 25	Maxim Iglinsky (KAZ)
5	Banneux to Banneux	175.6 km (109.1 mi)	Sunday, May 26	Luis León Sánchez (ESP)

== Teams ==
Twenty teams were invited to the 2013 Tour of Belgium: 9 UCI World Tour Teams, 6 UCI Professional Continental Teams and 5 UCI Continental Teams.

UCI ProTeams
- (Netherlands) Argos–Shimano
- (Kazakhstan) Astana
- (Netherlands) Blanco Pro Cycling
- (Belgium) Lotto–Belisol
- (Belgium) Omega Pharma–Quick-Step
- (United States) RadioShack–Leopard
- (Russia) Team Katusha
- (Denmark) Saxo–Tinkoff
- (Netherlands) Vacansoleil–DCM
UCI Professional Continental Teams
- (Belgium) Accent Jobs–Wanty
- (France) Cofidis
- (Belgium) Crelan–Euphony
- (Russia) RusVelo
- (France) Team Europcar
- (Belgium) Topsport Vlaanderen–Baloise
UCI Continental Teams
- (Belgium) An Post–Chain Reaction
- (Belgium) BKCP–Powerplus
- (Belgium) Telenet–Fidea
- (Belgium) To Win-Josan Cycling Team
- (Belgium) Wallonie-Bruxelles

== Stages ==
=== Stage 1 ===
22 May 2013 – Lochristi to Knokke-Heist, 194.2 km (120.7 mi)

Stage 1 Result

	Rider	Team	Time
1	André Greipel (GER)	Lotto–Belisol	4h 34' 53"
2	Tom Boonen (BEL)	Omega Pharma–Quick-Step	s.t.
3	Ramon Sinkeldam (NED)	Argos–Shimano	s.t.
4	Danny van Poppel (NED)	Vacansoleil–DCM	s.t.
5	Michael Van Staeyen (BEL)	Topsport Vlaanderen–Baloise	s.t.
6	Yukiya Arashiro (JPN)	Team Europcar	s.t.
7	Tom Van Asbroeck (BEL)	Topsport Vlaanderen–Baloise	s.t.
8	Niki Terpstra (NED)	Omega Pharma–Quick-Step	s.t.
9	Maxime Vantomme (BEL)	Crelan–Euphony	s.t.
10	Adrien Petit (FRA)	Cofidis	s.t.

General Classification after Stage 1

	Rider	Team	Time
1	André Greipel (GER)	Lotto–Belisol	4h 34' 43"
2	Tom Boonen (BEL)	Omega Pharma–Quick-Step	+ 4"
3	Ramon Sinkeldam (NED)	Argos–Shimano	+ 6"
4	Jürgen Roelandts (BEL)	Lotto–Belisol	+ 7"
5	Pieter Jacobs (BEL)	Topsport Vlaanderen–Baloise	+ 8"
6	Nikolas Maes (BEL)	Omega Pharma–Quick-Step	+ 9"
7	Danny van Poppel (NED)	Vacansoleil–DCM	+ 10"
8	Michael Van Staeyen (BEL)	Topsport Vlaanderen–Baloise	+ 10"
9	Yukiya Arashiro (JPN)	Team Europcar	+ 10"
10	Tom Van Asbroeck (BEL)	Topsport Vlaanderen–Baloise	+ 10"

=== Stage 2 ===
23 May 2013 – Knokke-Heist to Ninove, 181 km (112 mi)

Stage 2 Result

	Rider	Team	Time
1	André Greipel (GER)	Lotto–Belisol	4h 11' 29"
2	Danny van Poppel (NED)	Vacansoleil–DCM	s.t.
3	Tom Boonen (BEL)	Omega Pharma–Quick-Step	s.t.
4	Alexander Porsev (RUS)	Team Katusha	s.t.
5	Adrien Petit (FRA)	Cofidis	s.t.
6	Simone Ponzi (ITA)	Astana	s.t.
7	Alexey Tsatevich (RUS)	Team Katusha	s.t.
8	Ruslan Tleubayev (KAZ)	Astana	s.t.
9	Niki Terpstra (NED)	Omega Pharma–Quick-Step	s.t.
10	Ramon Sinkeldam (NED)	Argos–Shimano	s.t.

General Classification after Stage 2

	Rider	Team	Time
1	André Greipel (GER)	Lotto–Belisol	8h 46' 02"
2	Tom Boonen (BEL)	Omega Pharma–Quick-Step	+ 10"
3	Danny van Poppel (NED)	Vacansoleil–DCM	+ 14"
4	Ramon Sinkeldam (NED)	Argos–Shimano	+ 16"
5	Philippe Gilbert (BEL)	BMC Racing Team	+ 17"
6	Jürgen Roelandts (BEL)	Lotto–Belisol	+ 17"
7	Niki Terpstra (NED)	Omega Pharma–Quick-Step	+ 18"
8	Pieter Jacobs (BEL)	Topsport Vlaanderen–Baloise	+ 18"
9	Nikolas Maes (BEL)	Omega Pharma–Quick-Step	+ 19"
10	Francesco Gavazzi (ITA)	Astana	+ 19"

=== Stage 3 ===
24 May 2013 – Beveren to Beveren, 15 km (9.3 mi)

Stage 3 Result

	Rider	Team	Time
1	Tony Martin (GER)	Omega Pharma–Quick-Step	17' 42"
2	Tom Dumoulin (NED)	Argos–Shimano	+ 40"
3	Artem Ovechkin (RUS)	RusVelo	+ 43"
4	Alexander Serov (RUS)	RusVelo	+ 46"
5	Ben Hermans (BEL)	RadioShack–Leopard	+ 46"
6	Kristof Vandewalle (BEL)	Omega Pharma–Quick-Step	+ 53"
7	Damien Gaudin (FRA)	Team Europcar	+ 56"
8	Tom Boonen (BEL)	Omega Pharma–Quick-Step	+ 1' 00"
9	Will Clarke (AUS)	Argos–Shimano	+ 1' 00"
10	Niki Terpstra (NED)	Omega Pharma–Quick-Step	+ 1' 01"

General Classification after Stage 3

	Rider	Team	Time
1	Tony Martin (GER)	Omega Pharma–Quick-Step	9h 04' 04"
2	Tom Dumoulin (NED)	Argos–Shimano	+ 40"
3	Tom Boonen (BEL)	Omega Pharma–Quick-Step	+ 50"
4	Kristof Vandewalle (BEL)	Omega Pharma–Quick-Step	+ 53"
5	Niki Terpstra (NED)	Omega Pharma–Quick-Step	+ 59"
6	Philippe Gilbert (BEL)	BMC Racing Team	+ 1' 04"
7	Manuel Quinziato (ITA)	BMC Racing Team	+ 1' 11"
8	Stijn Devolder (BEL)	RadioShack–Leopard	+ 1' 11"
9	Luis León Sánchez (ESP)	Blanco Pro Cycling	+ 1' 16"
10	Alexey Tsatevich (RUS)	Team Katusha	+ 1' 17"

=== Stage 4 ===
25 May 2013 – Eau d'Heure lakes to Eau d'Heure lakes, 164.3 km (102.1 mi)

Stage 4 Result

	Rider	Team	Time
1	Maxim Iglinsky (KAZ)	Astana	3h 41' 38"
2	André Greipel (GER)	Lotto–Belisol	+ 2"
3	Philippe Gilbert (BEL)	BMC Racing Team	+ 2"
4	Danny van Poppel (NED)	Vacansoleil–DCM	+ 2"
5	Francesco Gavazzi (ITA)	Astana	+ 2"
6	Yukiya Arashiro (JPN)	Team Europcar	+ 2"
7	Reinardt Janse van Rensburg (RSA)	Argos–Shimano	+ 2"
8	Marcel Meisen (GER)	BKCP–Powerplus	+ 2"
9	Tom Van Asbroeck (BEL)	Topsport Vlaanderen–Baloise	+ 2"
10	Jean-Pierre Drucker (LUX)	Accent Jobs–Wanty	+ 2"

General Classification after Stage 4

	Rider	Team	Time
1	Tony Martin (GER)	Omega Pharma–Quick-Step	12h 45' 47"
2	Tom Dumoulin (NED)	Argos–Shimano	+ 40"
3	Tom Boonen (BEL)	Omega Pharma–Quick-Step	+ 50"
4	Kristof Vandewalle (BEL)	Omega Pharma–Quick-Step	+ 53"
5	Philippe Gilbert (BEL)	BMC Racing Team	+ 57"
6	Niki Terpstra (NED)	Omega Pharma–Quick-Step	+ 59"
7	André Greipel (GER)	Lotto–Belisol	+ 1' 10"
8	Manuel Quinziato (ITA)	BMC Racing Team	+ 1' 11"
9	Stijn Devolder (BEL)	RadioShack–Leopard	+ 1' 11"
10	Alexey Tsatevich (RUS)	Team Katusha	+ 1' 14"

=== Stage 5 ===
26 May 2013 – Banneux to Banneux, 175.6 km (109.1 mi)

Stage 5 Result

	Rider	Team	Time
1	Luis León Sánchez (ESP)	Blanco Pro Cycling	4h 42' 18"
2	Francesco Gavazzi (ITA)	Astana	+ 27"
3	Philippe Gilbert (BEL)	BMC Racing Team	+ 27"
4	Andreas Klöden (GER)	RadioShack–Leopard	+ 27"
5	Tony Martin (GER)	Omega Pharma–Quick-Step	+ 27"
6	Jürgen Roelandts (BEL)	Lotto–Belisol	+ 47"
7	Jérôme Baugnies (BEL)	To Win-Josan Cycling Team	+ 1' 13"
8	Marcel Meisen (GER)	BKCP–Powerplus	+ 1' 16"
9	Yukiya Arashiro (JPN)	Team Europcar	+ 1' 17"
10	Sergey Lagutin (UZB)	Vacansoleil–DCM	+ 1' 17"

Final Classification

	Rider	Team	Time
1	Tony Martin (GER)	Omega Pharma–Quick-Step	17h 28' 32"
2	Luis León Sánchez (ESP)	Blanco Pro Cycling	+ 36"
3	Philippe Gilbert (BEL)	BMC Racing Team	+ 51"
4	Andreas Klöden (GER)	RadioShack–Leopard	+ 1' 18"
5	Tom Dumoulin (NED)	Argos–Shimano	+ 1' 30"
6	Francesco Gavazzi (ITA)	Astana	+ 1' 36"
7	Kristof Vandewalle (BEL)	Omega Pharma–Quick-Step	+ 1' 43"
8	Jürgen Roelandts (BEL)	Lotto–Belisol	+ 1' 44"
9	Niki Terpstra (NED)	Omega Pharma–Quick-Step	+ 1' 49"
10	Alexey Tsatevich (RUS)	Team Katusha	+ 2' 04"

== Classification leadership table ==
Stage	Winner	General classification Algemeen klassement	Points classification Puntenklassement	Combativity Classification Prijs van de strijdlust	Young Rider classification Jongerenklassement	Team classification Ploegenklassement
1	André Greipel	André Greipel	André Greipel	Laurens De Vreese	Ramon Sinkeldam	Topsport Vlaanderen–Baloise
2	André Greipel	André Greipel	André Greipel	Stijn Steels	Danny van Poppel	Omega Pharma–Quick-Step
3	Tony Martin	Tony Martin	André Greipel	Stijn Steels	Tom Dumoulin	Omega Pharma–Quick-Step
4	Maxim Iglinsky	Tony Martin	André Greipel	Stijn Steels	Tom Dumoulin	Omega Pharma–Quick-Step
5	Luis León Sánchez	Tony Martin	André Greipel	Laurens De Vreese	Tom Dumoulin	Omega Pharma–Quick-Step
Final		Tony Martin	André Greipel	Laurens De Vreese	Tom Dumoulin	Omega Pharma–Quick-Step

== Final standings ==
=== General classification ===
	Rider	Team	Time
1	Tony Martin (GER)	Omega Pharma–Quick-Step	17h 28' 32"
2	Luis León Sánchez (ESP)	Blanco Pro Cycling	+ 36"
3	Philippe Gilbert (BEL)	BMC Racing Team	+ 51"
4	Andreas Klöden (GER)	RadioShack–Leopard	+ 1' 18"
5	Tom Dumoulin (NED)	Argos–Shimano	+ 1' 30"
6	Francesco Gavazzi (ITA)	Astana	+ 1' 36"
7	Kristof Vandewalle (BEL)	Omega Pharma–Quick-Step	+ 1' 43"
8	Jürgen Roelandts (BEL)	Lotto–Belisol	+ 1' 44"
9	Niki Terpstra (NED)	Omega Pharma–Quick-Step	+ 1' 49"
10	Alexey Tsatevich (RUS)	Team Katusha	+ 2' 04"

=== Points classification ===
	Rider	Team	Points
1	André Greipel (GER)	Lotto–Belisol	85
2	Philippe Gilbert (BEL)	BMC Racing Team	83
3	Danny van Poppel (NED)	Vacansoleil–DCM	63
4	Tom Boonen (BEL)	Omega Pharma–Quick-Step	59
5	Luis León Sánchez (ESP)	Blanco Pro Cycling	54
6	Francesco Gavazzi (ITA)	Astana	51
7	Niki Terpstra (NED)	Omega Pharma–Quick-Step	48
8	Tony Martin (GER)	Omega Pharma–Quick-Step	47
9	Yukiya Arashiro (JPN)	Team Europcar	41
10	Jürgen Roelandts (BEL)	Lotto–Belisol	39

=== Combativity classification ===
	Rider	Team	Points
1	Laurens De Vreese (BEL)	Topsport Vlaanderen–Baloise	56
2	Stijn Steels (BEL)	Crelan–Euphony	41
3	Sébastien Delfosse (BEL)	Crelan–Euphony	39
4	Arman Kamyshev (KAZ)	Astana	33
5	Alphonse Vermote (BEL)	An Post–Chain Reaction	29
6	Sébastien Turgot (FRA)	Team Europcar	29
7	Florent Barle (FRA)	Cofidis	25
8	Jens Debusschere (BEL)	Lotto–Belisol	23
9	Thomas Voeckler (FRA)	Team Europcar	19
10	Grégory Rast (SUI)	RadioShack–Leopard	17

=== Young rider classification ===
	Rider	Team	Time
1	Tom Dumoulin (NED)	Argos–Shimano	17h 30' 02"
2	Alexey Tsatevich (RUS)	Team Katusha	+ 34"
3	Gijs Van Hoecke (BEL)	Topsport Vlaanderen–Baloise	+ 1' 56"
4	Reinardt Janse van Rensburg (RSA)	Argos–Shimano	+ 2' 00"
5	Laurent Evrard (BEL)	Wallonie-Bruxelles	+ 3' 23"
6	Danny van Poppel (NED)	Vacansoleil–DCM	+ 5' 08"
7	Dominik Nerz (GER)	BMC Racing Team	+ 6' 50"
8	Marcel Meisen (GER)	BKCP–Powerplus	+ 8' 44"
9	Nikita Novikov (RUS)	Vacansoleil–DCM	+ 9' 30"
10	Marc Goos (NED)	Blanco Pro Cycling	+ 9' 49"

=== Team classification ===
	Team	Points
1	(Belgium) Omega Pharma–Quick-Step	52h 29' 09"
2	(United States) RadioShack–Leopard	+ 2' 26"
3	(Russia) Team Katusha	+ 4' 49"
4	(Netherlands) Blanco Pro Cycling	+ 5' 27"
5	(Netherlands) Vacansoleil–DCM	+ 6' 16"
6	(United States) BMC Racing Team	+ 6' 41"
7	(France) Cofidis	+ 8' 28"
8	(France) Team Europcar	+ 10' 09"
9	(Kazakhstan) Astana	+ 12' 29"
10	(Belgium) Crelan–Euphony	+ 12' 51"
