= Willem Wauters =

Belgian cyclist

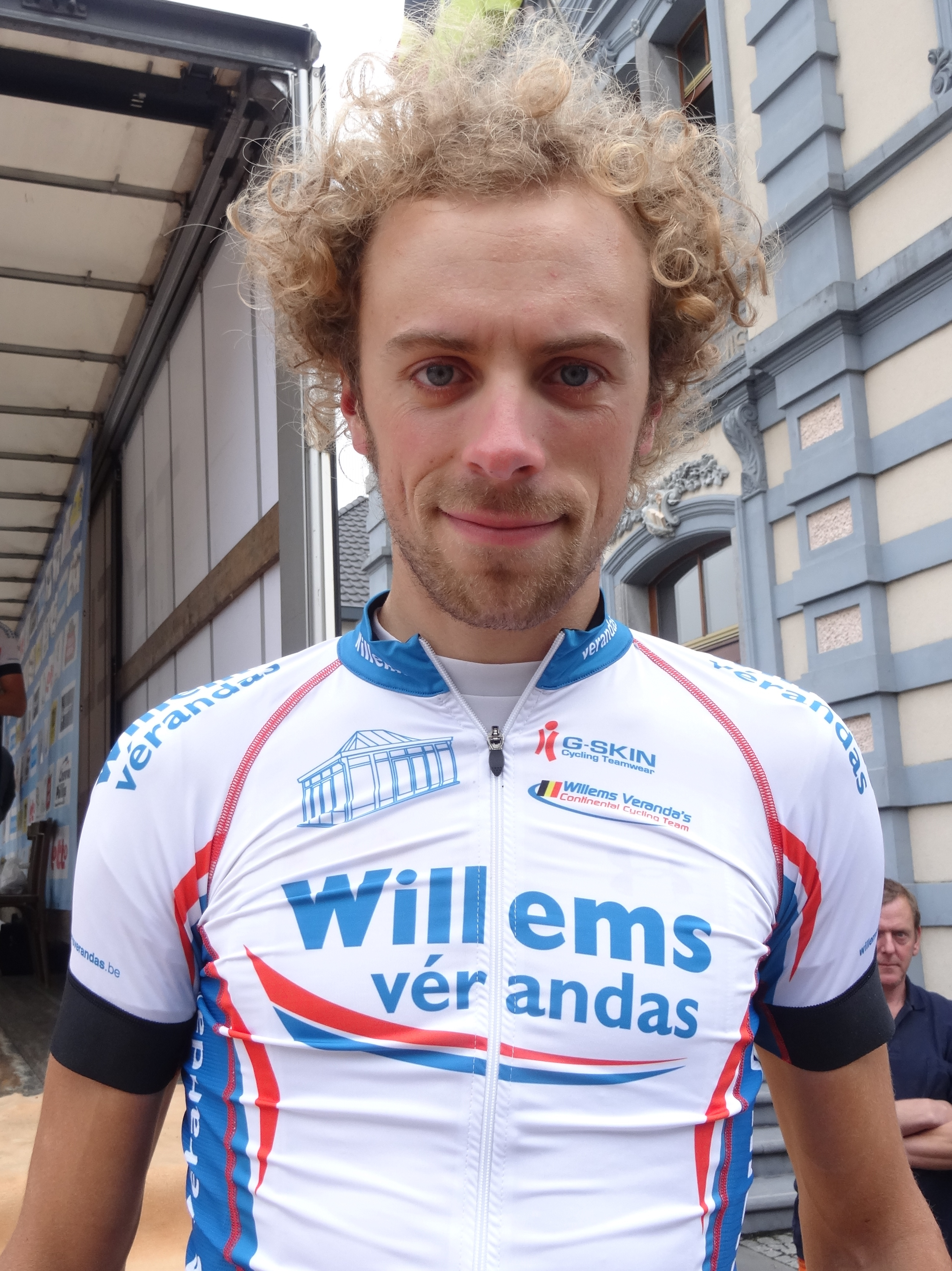
- Wauters in 2014

Personal information
- Born: 10 November 1989 (age 36) Ghent, Belgium

Cycling career
- Sport: Cycling
- Discipline: Road
- Role: Rider

Amateur teams
- 2008–2012: Davo
- 2011: Vacansoleil–DCM (stagiaire)
- 2012: Vacansoleil–DCM (stagiaire)

Professional teams
- 2013: Vacansoleil–DCM
- 2014: Verandas Willems

Willem Wauters (born 10 November 1989) is a Belgian former professional road cyclist. He rode in the 2013 Giro d'Italia, where he finished in 158th place.

== Major results ==
2010
1st Stage 3 Triptyque Ardennais
2011
1st Stage 4 Vuelta a la Comunidad de Madrid U23
2nd Grote Prijs Stad Zottegem
2013
Giro d'Italia

Held after Stage 3

2014
5th Paris–Mantes-en-Yvelines
