= Alexey Tsatevich =

Russian cyclist (1989–2024)

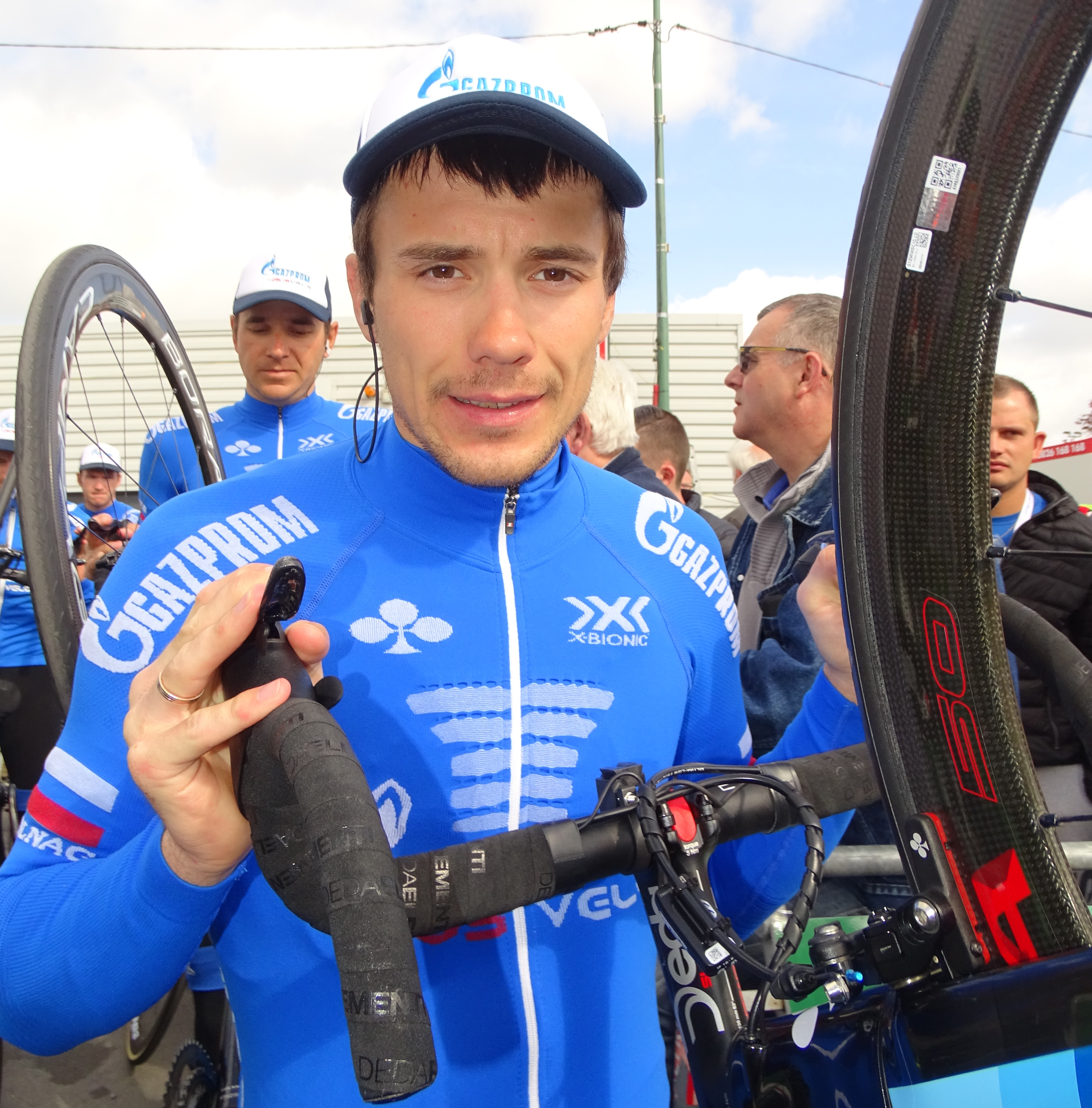
- Tsatevich in 2017

Personal information
- Full name: Alexey Tsatevich
- Born: 5 July 1989 Verkhnyaya Pyshma, Sverdlovsk Oblast, Russian SFSR, USSR
- Died: 8 April 2024 (aged 34)
- Height: 1.69 m (5 ft 7 in)
- Weight: 64 kg (141 lb)

Cycling career
- Sport: Cycling
- Discipline: Road
- Role: Rider
- Rider type: Sprinter

Amateur teams
- 2007: Pedale Castellano Pontenure
- 2011: Itera–Katusha

Professional teams
- 2012–2016: Team Katusha
- 2017: Gazprom–RusVelo

Alexey Vladimirovich Tsatevich (Russian: Алексей Владимирович Цатевич; 5 July 1989 – 8 April 2024) was a Russian professional road bicycle racer, who last rode for UCI Professional Continental team Gazprom–RusVelo.

== Career ==
Born in Verkhnyaya Pyshma in the then-Soviet Union, Tsatevich competed as a professional from the start of the 2012 season, when he joined Team Katusha, having previously competed for the squad's feeder team – Itera–Katusha – in 2011. After several top ten placements during the 2012 season, Tsatevich achieved the first win of his professional career in February 2013, when he won the 1.1-categorised Le Samyn race in Belgium. Tsatevich attacked with around 500 m (1,600 ft) remaining, and was able to beat the peloton to the line, in Dour.

Tsatevich was named in the start list for the 2016 Giro d'Italia. On Stage 9, the individual time trial, Tsatevich was fined for drafting behind Tobias Ludvigsson. Further to this, Team Katusha took the step to withdraw him from the race.

Tsatevich died on 8 April 2024, at the age of 34.

== Major results ==
2007
1st Trofeo San Rocco
10th Overall Trophée Centre Morbihan

1st Stage 1

2008
1st 2 Giorni Marchigiana
2009
4th Trofeo Città di San Vendemiano
9th Gran Premio della Liberazione
10th GP Inda
2010
1st Overall Gagra–Sukhumi

1st Stage 1

2nd Coppa del Mobilio
10th Gran Premio della Liberazione
2011
1st Criterium, National Road Championships
1st Grand Prix de la ville de Nogent-sur-Oise
1st Stage 2 Tour of Yeroskipos
1st Stage 2 GP Costa Azul
1st Stage 4 Tour Alsace
1st Stage 6 Tour of Bulgaria
2nd La Côte Picarde
2nd Grand Prix of Moscow
2nd Central European Tour Budapest GP
7th ZLM Tour
7th GP Kranj
8th Road race, UCI Under-23 Road World Championships
10th Mayor Cup
2012
8th Trofeo Palma de Mallorca
8th Le Samyn
8th Volta Limburg Classic
10th Trofeo Migjorn
2013
1st Le Samyn
1st Stage 3 Settimana Ciclistica Lombarda
9th Eschborn-Frankfurt City Loop
10th Overall Tour of Belgium
2014
2nd Le Samyn
7th Gent–Wevelgem
10th Brabantse Pijl
2015
3rd Trofeo Laigueglia
6th Overall Tour du Haut Var
10th Overall Circuit de la Sarthe
10th Dwars door Vlaanderen
2016
1st Stage 7 Volta a Catalunya
2nd Clásica de Almería
7th Cadel Evans Great Ocean Road Race

=== Grand Tour general classification results timeline ===
Grand Tour	2016	2017
Giro d'Italia	DNF	121
Tour de France	—	—
Vuelta a España	—	—

Legend
—	Did not compete
DNF	Did not finish
