= Mathieu Drujon =

French road bicycle

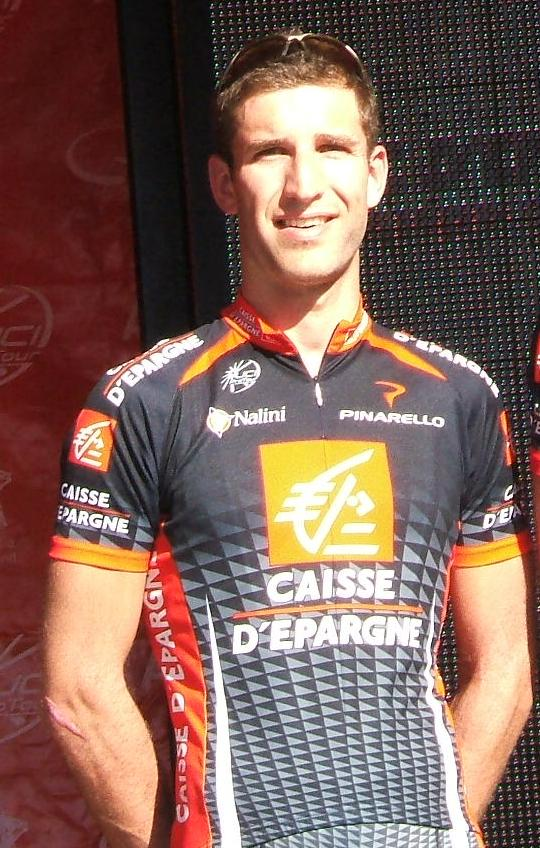

Personal information
- Full name: Mathieu Drujon
- Born: 1 February 1983 (age 43) Troyes, France

Cycling career
- Sport: Cycling
- Discipline: Road
- Role: Rider

Amateur teams
- 2004: Brioches La Boulangère (stagiaire)
- 2005: Française des Jeux (stagiaire)
- 2006–2007: Auber 93

Professional teams
- 2008–2010: Caisse d'Epargne
- 2011–2013: BigMat–Auber 93

Mathieu Drujon (born 1 February 1983) is a French former road bicycle racer. Drujon retired at the end of the 2013 season, after six years as a professional.

== Palmares ==
2004
1st, Stage 3, Ronde de l'Isard d'Ariège (U23)
2007
3rd, Tour de Vendée
2013
1st, Les Boucles du Sud Ardèche
4th, Paris–Troyes
7th, Classic Loire Atlantique
10th Overall, Tour du Haut Var
