= Javier Iriarte =

Spanish bicycle racer

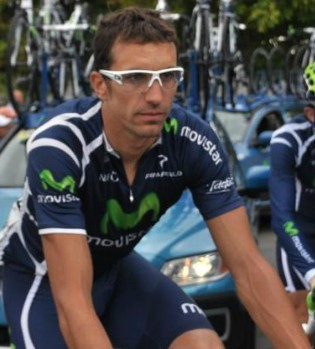

Personal information
- Full name: Francisco Javier Iriarte Garro
- Born: November 11, 1986 (age 39) Zizur Mayor

Cycling career
- Sport: Cycling
- Current team: Retired
- Discipline: Road
- Role: Rider

Amateur teams
- 2005–2007: Seguros Bilbao
- 2009–2010: Lizarte

Professional teams
- 2008: Burgos Monumental
- 2011–2012: Movistar Team

Francisco Javier Iriarte Garro (born November 11, 1986, in Zizur Mayor) is a Spanish former professional road bicycle racer.

In October 2012, Iriarte announced his retirement because of recurring left leg muscle pain.

== Major results ==
2009
5th Overall Vuelta a Salamanca

1st Stage 4

2010
1st Road race, Navarre Regional Road Championships
