= Enrique Sanz =

Spanish cyclist (born 1989)

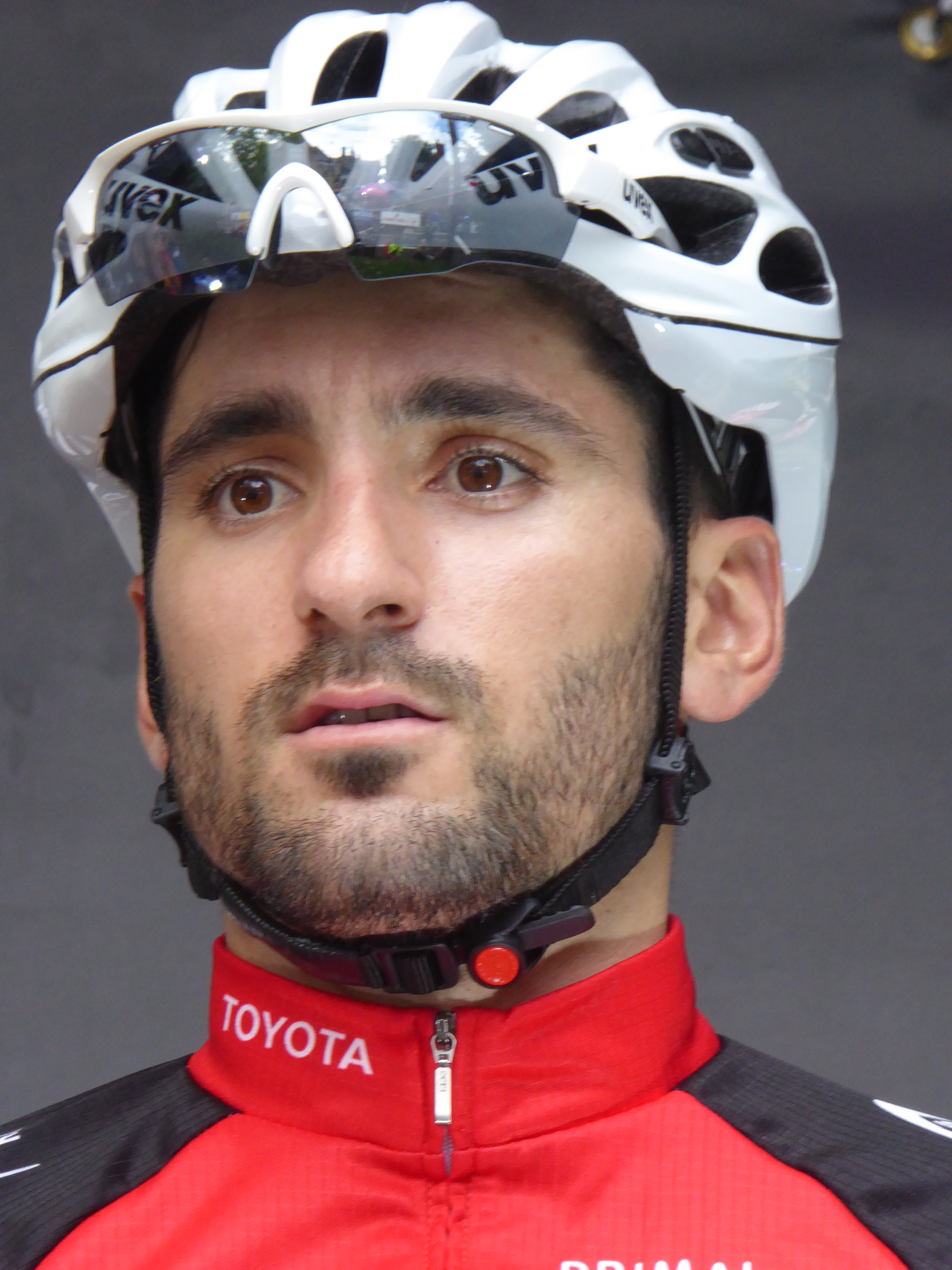
- Sanz in 2017.

Personal information
- Full name: Enrique Sanz Unzué
- Born: 11 September 1989 (age 37)
- Height: 1.71 m (5 ft 7 in)
- Weight: 64 kg (141 lb)

Cycling career
- Sport: Cycling
- Current team: Retired
- Discipline: Road
- Role: Rider
- Rider type: Sprinter; Domestique

Amateur team
- 2008–2010: Lizarte

Professional teams
- 2011–2015: Movistar Team
- 2016: Southeast–Venezuela
- 2017: Team Raleigh–GAC
- 2018–2019: Euskadi–Murias
- 2020–2021: Equipo Kern Pharma

Enrique Sanz Unzué (born 11 September 1989) is a Spanish former professional cyclist.

Sanz comes from a sporting family; he is the nephew of the Movistar Team general manager, Eusebio Unzué, while his father Enrique and brother Jorge also work for the team. Another uncle, Juan Carlos Unzué, is a former professional footballer and assistant manager of FC Barcelona.

== Major results ==
2011
1st Stage 2 Vuelta a la Comunidad de Madrid
2012
3rd Circuito de Getxo
6th Vuelta a La Rioja
7th Coppa Bernocchi
2013
5th Trofeo Campos–Santanyí–Ses Salines
7th Vuelta a La Rioja
2015
6th Circuito de Getxo
2017
8th Trofeo Playa de Palma
2018
4th Trofeo Palma
2019
Volta ao Alentejo

1st Stages 1, 2 & 6

4th Circuito de Getxo
8th Overall Vuelta a Castilla y León

1st Stage 3

2020
1st Stage 3 Belgrade Banjaluka
4th Trofeo Campos, Porreres, Felanitx, Ses Salines
2021
1st Stage 6 Volta ao Alentejo
2nd Poreč Trophy
4th Clàssica Comunitat Valenciana 1969
