= José Joaquín Rojas =

Spanish road bicycle racer (born 1985)

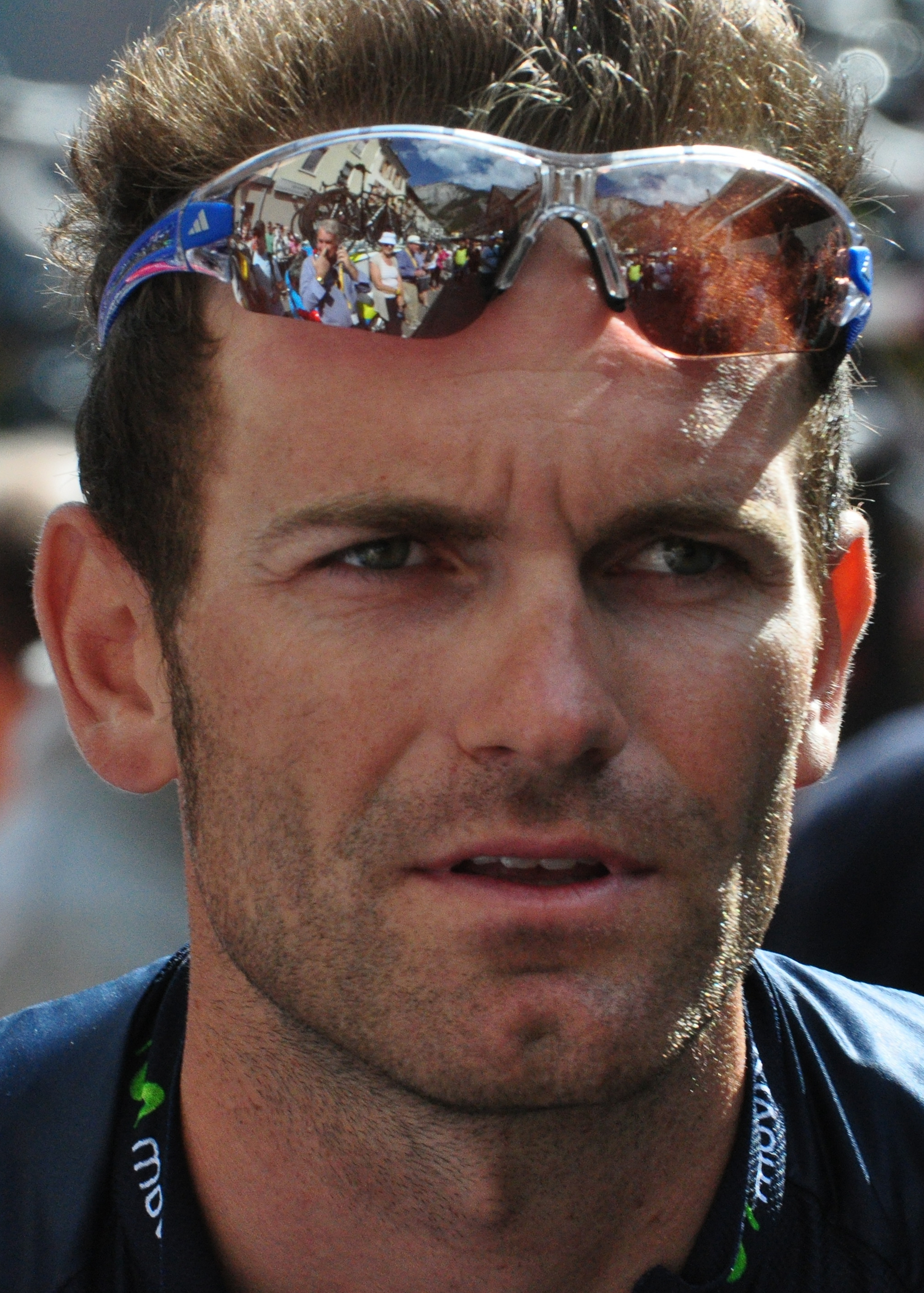
- Rojas at the 2013 Tour de France.

Personal information
- Full name: José Joaquín Rojas Gil
- Born: 8 June 1985 (age 41) Cieza, Murcia, Spain
- Height: 1.77 m (5 ft 10 in)
- Weight: 70 kg (154 lb)

Cycling career
- Sport: Cycling
- Current team: Retired
- Discipline: Road
- Role: Rider
- Rider type: Sprinter

Amateur team
- 2005: Liberty Seguros–Würth (stagiaire)

Professional teams
- 2006: Liberty Seguros–Würth
- 2007–2023: Caisse d'Epargne

Major wins
- One-Day Races and Classics National Road Race Championships (2011, 2016)

José Joaquín Rojas Gil (born 8 June 1985) is a Spanish former professional road racing cyclist, who competed as a professional from 2006 to 2023.

== Career ==
Rojas turned professional in 2006 with Liberty Seguros–Würth. His older brother Mariano Rojas, was a professional cyclist as well, riding for ONCE until 1996. He died in the same year as a result of a traffic accident.

Rojas was selected to ride the 2012 Tour de France, but crashed out on Stage 3, with a fractured left collarbone, the second retirement of the 2012 Tour after Team Sky's Kanstantsin Sivtsov.

Rojas was again selected to ride the 2013 Tour de France and finished 79th overall, one of the highest GC placings among the sprinters; he also finished in 7th place in the points classification with 156 points. His best result was a third place on the third stage – in which he contested the bunch sprint – which was one of seven top-ten finishes during the Tour. He was disqualified from the 2014 Tour de France for excessive sheltering behind his team car during the descent of the Tourmalet.

== Major results ==
2002
1st Road race, National Junior Road Championships
2003
1st Time trial, National Junior Road Championships
4th Road race, UCI Junior Road World Championships
2005
2nd Overall Vuelta a Extremadura

1st Points classification

2006
1st Mountains classification Tirreno–Adriatico
7th Overall Three Days of De Panne
10th Circuito de Getxo
2007
1st Stage 1 Vuelta a Murcia
2nd Trofeo Mallorca
2nd Trofeo Cala Millor
3rd Circuito de Getxo
6th Prueba Villafranca de Ordizia
9th Overall Tour de Pologne

1st Points classification

9th Gent–Wevelgem
10th Châteauroux Classic
2008
1st Trofeo Pollença
2nd Gran Premio de Llodio
3rd Overall Tour Down Under

1st Young rider classification

4th Overall Four Days of Dunkirk
4th Overall Tour du Limousin
5th Overall Paris–Corrèze
5th Trofeo Cala Millor
5th Clásica de Almería
5th GP Ouest–France
5th Vattenfall Cyclassics
6th Trofeo Mallorca
7th Gent–Wevelgem
2009
1st Stage 2 Tour de l'Ain
3rd Overall Tour Down Under

1st Young rider classification

4th Trofeo Pollença
4th Gran Premio de Llodio
5th Down Under Classic
9th Trofeo Cala Millor
2010
2nd Gran Premio dell'Insubria-Lugano
3rd Overall Four Days of Dunkirk

1st Points classification

4th Trofeo Magaluf-Palmanova
5th Trofeo Deià
5th GP Ouest–France
6th Paris–Camembert
7th Trofeo Cala Millor
8th Overall Tour du Limousin
9th Trofeo Palma
2011
1st Road race, National Road Championships
1st Trofeo Deià
1st Stage 6 Volta a Catalunya
2nd Clásica de Almería
3rd Trofeo Magaluf-Palmanova
4th Overall Tour du Haut Var
4th Trofeo Palma
5th Vattenfall Cyclassics
7th Overall Tour du Poitou-Charentes
7th GP Ouest–France
8th Down Under Classic
10th Trofeo Cala Millor
Tour de France

Held after Stages 3, 4 & 7

2012
1st Stage 1 Tour of the Basque Country
1st Stage 1 (TTT) Vuelta a España
9th Trofeo Migjorn
2013
3rd Trofeo Campos–Santanyí–Ses Salines
4th Vattenfall Cyclassics
5th Trofeo Platja de Muro
6th Overall Vuelta a Castilla y León
6th Trofeo Palma de Mallorca
8th Down Under Classic
2014
Vuelta a Castilla y León

1st Points classification
1st Stage 1

4th Overall Paris–Nice
4th Circuito de Getxo
5th Vuelta a Murcia
6th Clásica de Almería
2015
1st Stage 1 Tour of Qatar
3rd Trofeo Santanyi-SesSalines-Campos
4th Circuito de Getxo
4th Trofeo Serra de Tramuntana
5th Gran Piemonte
2016
1st Road race, National Road Championships
10th Clásica de Almería
2017
3rd Vuelta a La Rioja
5th Amstel Gold Race
10th GP Industria & Artigianato di Larciano
Combativity award Stage 18 Vuelta a España
2018
6th Trofeo Matteotti
8th Trofeo Palma
9th Vuelta a Murcia
2019
5th Circuito de Getxo
5th Clásica de Almería
9th Trofeo Serra de Tramuntana
10th Trofeo Palma
2021
4th Vuelta a Murcia
2023
4th Clàssica Comunitat Valenciana 1969

=== Grand Tour general classification results timeline ===
Grand Tour	2007	2008	2009	2010	2011	2012	2013	2014	2015	2016	2017	2018	2019	2020	2021	2022	2023
Giro d'Italia	DNF	—	—	—	—	—	—	—	—	49	50	—	50	—	—	69	79
Tour de France	—	—	84	68	80	DNF	79	DSQ	—	—	—	DNF	—	70	—	—	—
/ Vuelta a España	—	—	—	—	—	DNF	—	—	43	DNF	22	—	30	32	56	—	—

Legend
—	Did not compete
DNF	Did not finish
DSQ	Disqualified

Sporting positions
Preceded by Iván Gutiérrez	Spanish National Road Race Championships; Winner; 2011	Succeeded by Francisco Ventoso
