= Imanol Erviti =

Road bicycle racer

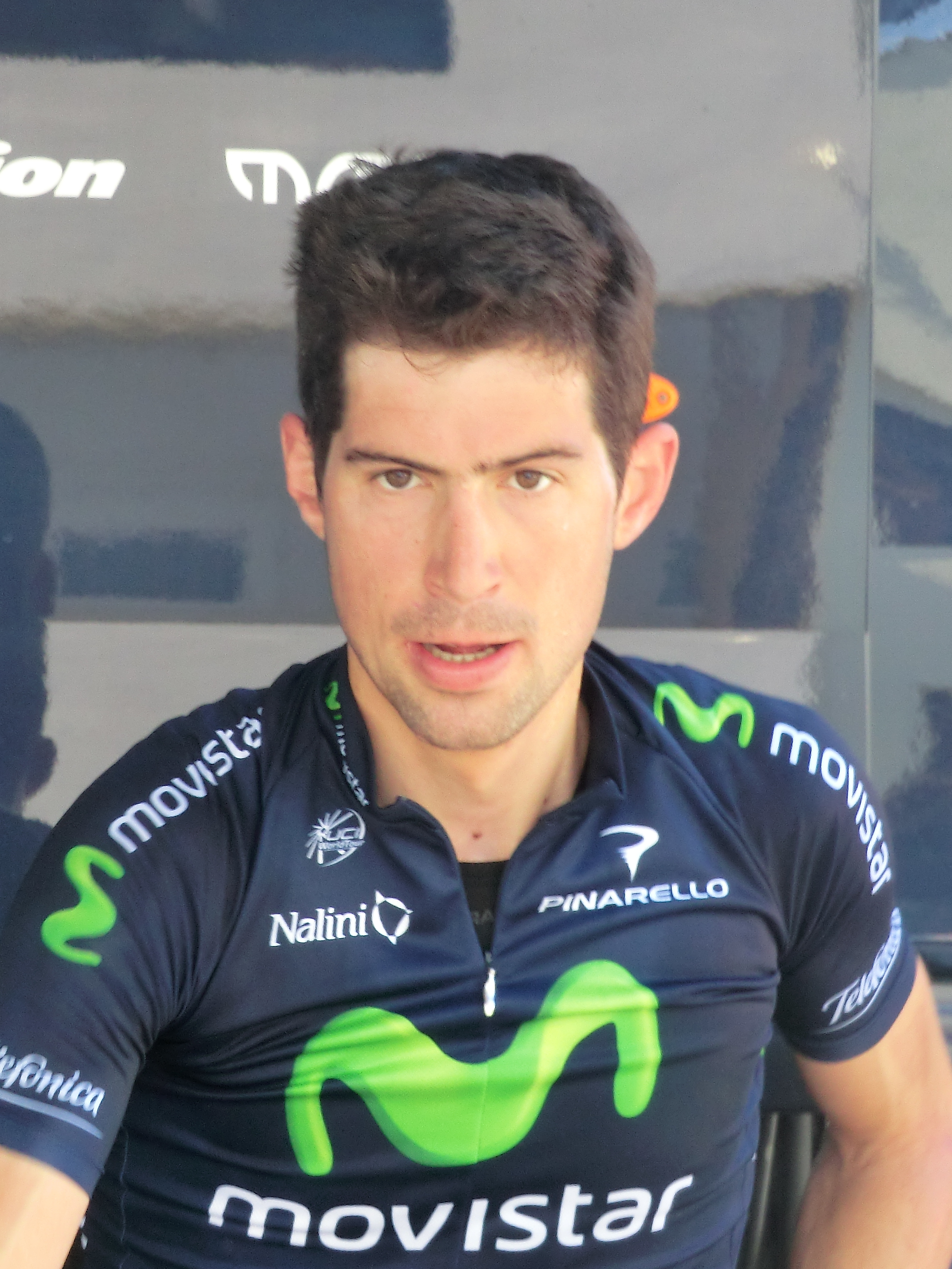
- Erviti at the 2013 Critérium du Dauphiné

Personal information
- Full name: Imanol Erviti Ollo
- Born: 15 November 1983 (age 42) Pamplona, Spain
- Height: 1.89 m (6 ft 2 1/2 in)
- Weight: 82 kg (181 lb; 12 st 13 lb)

Cycling career
- Sport: Cycling
- Current team: Netcompany–Ineos
- Discipline: Road
- Role: Rider (retired); Directeur sportif
- Rider type: Classics specialist; Domestique

Amateur team
- 2004: Serbitzu Kirolgi

Professional team
- 2005–2023: Illes Balears–Banesto

Managerial team
- 2024–: INEOS Grenadiers (directeur sportif)

Major wins
- Grand Tours Vuelta a España 2 individual stages (2008, 2010) 2 TTT stages (2012, 2014)

Imanol Erviti Ollo (born 15 November 1983) is a Spanish former professional road bicycle racer, who rode professionally between 2005 and 2023, entirely for Illes Balears–Banesto and its successors. Primarily working as a domestique, Erviti took three victories as a professional – including two stage victories at the Vuelta a España in 2008 and 2010.

Following his retirement, Erviti became a directeur sportif for UCI WorldTeam Netcompany–Ineos.

== Career ==
Born in Pamplona, Navarre, Erviti's first UCI race success came at the 2004 Vuelta a Navarra as an amateur, winning the final stage while riding for the Serbitzu Kirolgi team. He turned professional the following year with Illes Balears–Banesto. He formed part of two team time trial stage victories in 2007 at the Tour Méditerranéen and the Volta a Catalunya, before taking his first professional victory at the 2008 Vuelta a España. Having missed out on a stage victory when he was caught by the sprinters after an attack with 4 kilometres (2.5 miles) remaining on stage 17, Erviti won the following day after passing Nicolas Roche before the finish line in Las Rozas de Madrid, having been a part of a larger breakaway group.

After being a part of another team time trial stage victory at the 2009 Tour Méditerranéen, Erviti took his second Vuelta a España stage win at the 2010 race, after a solo move in the closing kilometres of the stage. The following year, he won the Vuelta a La Rioja one-day race, out-sprinting EPM–UNE teammates Giovanny Báez and Juan Pablo Suárez. He was selected to ride the 2012 Tour de France, but crashed as part of a large pile-up on stage 6 with 25 kilometres (16 miles) remaining. Erviti suffered "serious wounds in his right side", that required surgery, a 48-hour hospital stay and as a result, did not start stage 7. He also contested that year's Vuelta a España, again forming part of a stage-winning effort by the Movistar Team in the team time trial. He also formed part of the Movistar Team's team time trial stage win at the 2014 Vuelta a España.

In 2016, he was in the early breakaway in the two cycling monuments held as cobbled classics, the Tour of Flanders and Paris–Roubaix. He finished both races in the top 10 – the first Spanish rider to do so in the same year – with his seventh-place finish in the Tour of Flanders being the best result for any Movistar Team rider at the race over the team's history. At the 2021 Tour de France, Erviti finished second on stage twelve, having featured as part of the day's breakaway before Nils Politt soloed away to take the stage victory in Nîmes. He retired at the end of the 2023 season, becoming a directeur sportif with UCI WorldTeam INEOS Grenadiers ahead of the 2024 season.

== Major results ==
2004
1st Stage 6 Vuelta a Navarra
2007
1st Stage 1 (TTT) Volta a Catalunya
1st Stage 1 (TTT) Tour Méditerranéen
2008
1st Stage 18 Vuelta a España
2009
4th Overall Tour Méditerranéen

1st Stage 2 (TTT)

2010
1st Stage 10 Vuelta a España
7th Overall Four Days of Dunkirk
2011
1st Vuelta a La Rioja
2012
1st Stage 1 (TTT) Vuelta a España
2014
1st Stage 1 (TTT) Vuelta a España
5th Time trial, National Road Championships
2016
7th Tour of Flanders
9th Paris–Roubaix
2017
5th Time trial, National Road Championships

=== Grand Tour general classification results timeline ===
Grand Tour	2006	2007	2008	2009	2010	2011	2012	2013	2014	2015	2016	2017	2018	2019	2020	2021	2022	2023
Giro d'Italia	81	—	—	—	—	—	—	—	—	—	—	—	—	—	—	—	—	—
Tour de France	—	—	—	—	77	88	DNF	118	81	115	108	92	77	99	74	67	DNF	—
/ Vuelta a España	—	62	99	100	78	126	132	102	63	100	84	—	92	64	47	66	—	78

Legend
—	Did not compete
DNF	Did not finish
