= Eusebio Unzué =

Spanish cycling team manager

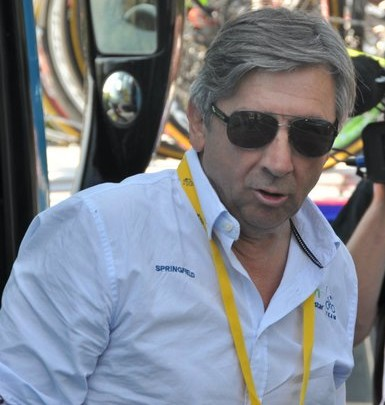
- Unzué in 2012

Personal information
- Full name: Eusebio Unzué Labiano
- Born: 26 February 1955 (age 71) Orcoyen, Navarra, Spain

Cycling career
- Sport: Cycling
- Current team: Movistar Team
- Discipline: Road
- Role: Team manager

Managerial teams
- 1980–: Reynolds (men)
- 2019–2020: Movistar Team (women)

Eusebio Unzué Labiano (born 26 February 1955 in Orcoyen, Navarra) is the team manager of UCI WorldTeam Movistar Team.

Movistar Team is a continuation of the former Banesto cycling team, where Unzué was also the team manager. He helped José María Jiménez, Pedro Delgado and Miguel Indurain to their many victories, especially in the Tour de France.

He is the brother of former footballer and assistant manager of FC Barcelona Juan Carlos Unzué and the uncle of racing cyclist Enrique Sanz.
