= 2014 IAM Cycling season =

IAM Cycling
- 2014 season
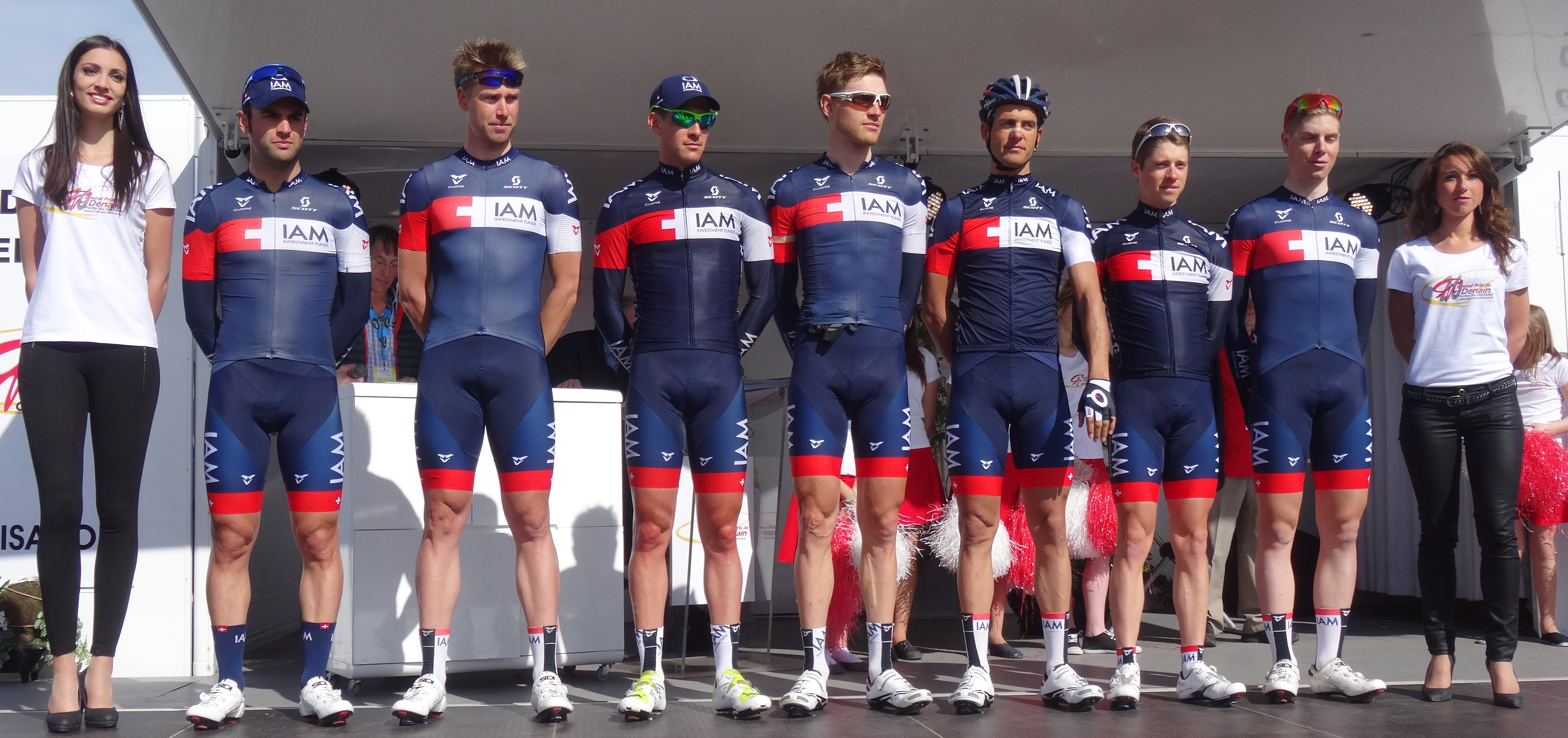
- The team at the 2014 Grand Prix de Denain
- UCI code: IAM
- Status: UCI Professional Continental
- Europe Tour ranking: 5th (1268 points)
- Manager: Serge Beucherie
- Main sponsor(s): IAM Independent Asset Management
- Based: Switzerland
- Bicycles: Scott?
- Groupset: Shimano?

Season victories
- One-day races: 3
- Stage race overall: 1
- Stage race stages: 10
- National Championships: 3
- Most wins: Sylvain Chavanel (5 wins)

The 2014 season for the IAM Cycling cycling team began in February at the Grand Prix d'Ouverture La Marseillaise. The team participated in UCI Continental Circuits and UCI World Tour events when given a wildcard invitation.

== 2014 roster ==
As of 18 February 2014.

Rider	Date of birth
Marcel Aregger (SUI)	26 August 1990 (age 34)
Matthias Brändle (AUT)	7 December 1989 (age 35)
Sylvain Chavanel (FRA)	30 June 1979 (age 45)
Stefan Denifl (AUT)	20 September 1987 (age 37)
Martin Elmiger (SUI)	23 September 1978 (age 46)
Mathias Frank (SUI)	9 December 1986 (age 38)
Jonathan Fumeaux (SUI)	7 March 1988 (age 37)
Heinrich Haussler (AUS)	25 February 1984 (age 41)
Sébastien Hinault (FRA)	11 February 1974 (age 51)
Reto Hollenstein (SUI)	22 August 1985 (age 39)
Sondre Holst Enger (Note: Holst Enger will join the team on 1 August as a stagiaire, from Team Sparebanken Sør.) (NOR)	17 December 1993 (age 31)
Kevyn Ista (BEL)	25 November 1984 (age 40)
Dominic Klemme (GER)	31 October 1986 (age 38)

Rider	Date of birth
Roger Kluge (GER)	5 February 1986 (age 39)
Pirmin Lang (SUI)	25 November 1984 (age 40)
Gustav Larsson (SWE)	20 September 1980 (age 44)
Thomas Löfkvist (SWE)	4 April 1984 (age 40)
Matteo Pelucchi (ITA)	21 January 1989 (age 36)
Jérôme Pineau (FRA)	2 January 1980 (age 45)
Sébastien Reichenbach (SUI)	28 May 1989 (age 35)
Vicente Reynés (ESP)	30 July 1981 (age 43)
Aleksejs Saramotins (LAT)	8 April 1982 (age 42)
Patrick Schelling (SUI)	1 May 1990 (age 34)
Johann Tschopp (SUI)	1 July 1982 (age 42)
Marcel Wyss (SUI)	25 June 1986 (age 38)

Riders who joined the team for the 2014 season

Rider	2013 team
Sylvain Chavanel	Omega Pharma–Quick-Step
Mathias Frank	BMC Racing Team
Roger Kluge	NetApp–Endura
Jérôme Pineau	Omega Pharma–Quick-Step
Vicente Reynés	Lotto–Belisol

Riders who left the team during or after the 2013 season

Rider	2014 team
Marco Bandiera	Androni Giocattoli–Venezuela
Rémi Cusin	Retired
Alexandre Pliușchin	Skydive Dubai Pro Cycling

== Season victories ==
Date	Race	Competition	Rider	Country	Location
13 March	Tirreno–Adriatico, Stage 2	UCI World Tour	Matteo Pelucchi (ITA)	Italy	Cascina
30 March	Critérium International, Stage 3	UCI Europe Tour	Mathias Frank (SUI)	France	Col de l'Ospedale
30 March	Critérium International, Points classification	UCI Europe Tour	Mathias Frank (SUI)	France	
30 March	Critérium International, Mountains classification	UCI Europe Tour	Mathias Frank (SUI)	France	
30 March	Critérium International, Teams classification	UCI Europe Tour	(Note: The riders on the squad were Gustav Larsson, Matthias Brändle, Mathias Frank, Jonathan Fumeaux, Sébastien Reichenbach, Patrick Schelling, Johann Tschopp and Marcel Wyss)	France	
4 May	Tour de Romandie, Mountains classification	UCI World Tour	Johann Tschopp (SUI)	Switzerland	
9 May	Four Days of Dunkirk, Stage 3	UCI Europe Tour	Sylvain Chavanel (FRA)	France	Calais
10 May	Tour de Berne	UCI Europe Tour	Matthias Brändle (AUT)	Switzerland	Bern
25 May	Tour of Norway, Teams classification	UCI Europe Tour	(Note: The riders on the squad were Jonathan Fumeaux, Sébastien Hinault, Gustav Larsson, Sébastien Reichenbach, Aleksejs Saramotins and Patrick Schelling)	Norway	
28 May	Bayern Rundfahrt, Stage 1	UCI Europe Tour	Heinrich Haussler (AUS)	Germany	Freilassing
29 May	Bayern Rundfahrt, Stage 2	UCI Europe Tour	Mathias Frank (SUI)	Germany	Reit im Winkl Winklmoos-Alm
22 June	Tour de Suisse, Swiss rider classification	UCI World Tour	Mathias Frank (SUI)	Switzerland	
14 August	Vuelta a Burgos, Stage 2	UCI Europe Tour	Matteo Pelucchi (ITA)	Spain	Villadiego
17 August	Vuelta a Burgos, Stage 5	UCI Europe Tour	Aleksejs Saramotins (LAT)	Spain	Aranda de Duero
28 August	Tour du Poitou-Charentes, Stage 4	UCI Europe Tour	Sylvain Chavanel (FRA)	France	L'Isle-Jourdain
29 August	Tour du Poitou-Charentes, Overall	UCI Europe Tour	Sylvain Chavanel (FRA)	France	
29 August	Tour du Poitou-Charentes, Teams classification	UCI Europe Tour	(Note: The riders on the squad were Sylvain Chavanel, Martin Elmiger, Matthias Brändle, Jérôme Pineau, Sébastien Reichenbach, Kevyn Ista, Thomas Löfkvist and Simon Pellaud)	France	
31 August	GP Ouest–France	UCI World Tour	Sylvain Chavanel (FRA)	France	Plouay
11 September	Tour of Britain, Stage 5	UCI Europe Tour	Matthias Brändle (AUT)	United Kingdom	Exeter
12 September	Tour of Britain, Stage 6	UCI Europe Tour	Matthias Brändle (AUT)	United Kingdom	Hemel Hempstead
14 September	Tour of Britain, Teams classification	UCI Europe Tour	(Note: The riders on the squad were Sylvain Chavanel, Heinrich Haussler, Kevyn Ista, Matthias Brändle, Sébastien Reichenbach and Jérôme Pineau)	United Kingdom	
19 October	Chrono des Nations	UCI Europe Tour	Sylvain Chavanel (FRA)	France	Les Herbiers
