= List of teams and cyclists in the 2014 Vuelta a España =

List of cyclists

The 2014 Vuelta a España was the 69th edition of the Vuelta a España, one of cycling's Grand Tours. The Vuelta a España features 198 riders competing from 22 cycling teams; the race took place from 23 August to 14 September 2014, starting in Jerez de la Frontera and finishing in Santiago de Compostela.

== Teams ==
All eighteen UCI ProTeams were automatically invited and were obliged to attend the race. In April 2014, four UCI Professional Continental teams were given wildcard places into the race, to complete a 22-team peloton. MTN–Qhubeka's inclusion in the race was the first instance of an African-licensed team appearing at a Grand Tour.

The 22 teams that competed in the race were:

- Ag2r–La Mondiale
- Astana
- Belkin Pro Cycling
- BMC Racing Team
- Caja Rural–Seguros RGA*
- Cannondale
- Cofidis*
- Team Europcar
- FDJ.fr
- Garmin–Sharp
- Giant–Shimano
- IAM Cycling*
- Team Katusha
- Lampre–Merida
- Lotto–Belisol
- Movistar Team
- MTN–Qhubeka*
- Omega Pharma–Quick-Step
- Orica–GreenEDGE
- Team Sky
- Tinkoff–Saxo
- Trek Factory Racing

*: Pro Continental teams given wild card entry to this event.

== By rider ==
The list of riders at the start of the race was:

Legend
| No. | Starting number worn by the rider during the Vuelta |
| Pos. | Position in the general classification |
| A yellow jersey | Denotes the winner of the General classification |
| A green jersey | Denotes the winner of the Points classification |
| A white jersey with blue dots | Denotes the winner of the Mountains classification |
| A white jersey | Denotes the winner of the Combination classification |
| DNS | Denotes a rider who did not start, followed by the stage before which he withdrew |
| DNF | Denotes a rider who did not finish, followed by the stage in which he withdrew |
| HD | Denotes a rider finished outside the time limit, followed by the stage in which he did so |
| DSQ | Denotes a rider who was disqualified from the race, followed by the stage in which this occurred |
Age correct as of 23 August 2014, the date on which the Vuelta began

| No. | Name | Nationality | Team | Age | Position |
|---|---|---|---|---|---|
| 1 | Valerio Conti | Italy | Lampre–Merida | 21 | 112 |
| 2 | Winner Anacona | Colombia | Lampre–Merida | 26 | 27 |
| 3 | Damiano Cunego | Italy | Lampre–Merida | 32 | 76 |
| 4 | Elia Favilli | Italy | Lampre–Merida | 25 | 109 |
| 5 | Roberto Ferrari | Italy | Lampre–Merida | 31 | 145 |
| 6 | Przemysław Niemiec | Poland | Lampre–Merida | 34 | 26 |
| 7 | Filippo Pozzato | Italy | Lampre–Merida | 32 | DNS-20 |
| 8 | Maximiliano Richeze | Argentina | Lampre–Merida | 31 | 138 |
| 9 | José Serpa | Colombia | Lampre–Merida | 35 | 93 |
| 11 | Hubert Dupont | France | Ag2r–La Mondiale | 33 | 54 |
| 12 | Carlos Betancur | Colombia | Ag2r–La Mondiale | 24 | 158 |
| 13 | Maxime Bouet | France | Ag2r–La Mondiale | 27 | DNF-11 |
| 14 | Damien Gaudin | France | Ag2r–La Mondiale | 28 | 132 |
| 15 | Patrick Gretsch | Germany | Ag2r–La Mondiale | 27 | 126 |
| 16 | Yauheni Hutarovich | Belarus | Ag2r–La Mondiale | 30 | 134 |
| 17 | Lloyd Mondory | France | Ag2r–La Mondiale | 32 | DNF-15 |
| 18 | Rinaldo Nocentini | Italy | Ag2r–La Mondiale | 36 | 96 |
| 19 | Sébastien Turgot | France | Ag2r–La Mondiale | 30 | 154 |
| 21 | Fabio Aru | Italy | Astana | 24 | 5 |
| 22 | Daniil Fominykh | Kazakhstan | Astana | 22 | DNF-20 |
| 23 | Andrea Guardini | Italy | Astana | 25 | 159 |
| 24 | Jacopo Guarnieri | Italy | Astana | 27 | 150 |
| 25 | Tanel Kangert | Estonia | Astana | 27 | DNF-17 |
| 26 | Mikel Landa | Spain | Astana | 24 | 28 |
| 27 | Alexey Lutsenko | Kazakhstan | Astana | 21 | 100 |
| 28 | Paolo Tiralongo | Italy | Astana | 37 | 33 |
| 29 | Andrey Zeits | Kazakhstan | Astana | 27 | 50 |
| 31 | Wilco Kelderman | Netherlands | Belkin Pro Cycling | 23 | 14 |
| 32 | Stef Clement | Netherlands | Belkin Pro Cycling | 31 | 69 |
| 33 | Laurens ten Dam | Netherlands | Belkin Pro Cycling | 33 | 44 |
| 34 | Robert Gesink | Netherlands | Belkin Pro Cycling | 28 | DNS-18 |
| 35 | Moreno Hofland | Netherlands | Belkin Pro Cycling | 22 | DNF-9 |
| 36 | Paul Martens | Germany | Belkin Pro Cycling | 30 | 58 |
| 37 | Martijn Keizer | Netherlands | Belkin Pro Cycling | 26 | 80 |
| 38 | Maarten Tjallingii | Netherlands | Belkin Pro Cycling | 36 | 137 |
| 39 | Robert Wagner | Germany | Belkin Pro Cycling | 31 | 151 |
| 41 | Samuel Sánchez | Spain | BMC Racing Team | 36 | 6 |
| 42 | Rohan Dennis | Australia | BMC Racing Team | 24 | 84 |
| 43 | Cadel Evans | Australia | BMC Racing Team | 37 | 52 |
| 44 | Philippe Gilbert | Belgium | BMC Racing Team | 32 | 45 |
| 45 | Steve Morabito | Switzerland | BMC Racing Team | 31 | DNF-11 |
| 46 | Dominik Nerz | Germany | BMC Racing Team | 24 | 18 |
| 47 | Manuel Quinziato | Italy | BMC Racing Team | 34 | 68 |
| 48 | Larry Warbasse | United States | BMC Racing Team | 24 | 74 |
| 49 | Danilo Wyss | Switzerland | BMC Racing Team | 28 | 36 |
| 51 | Luis León Sánchez | Spain | Caja Rural–Seguros RGA | 30 | 56 |
| 52 | Javier Aramendia | Spain | Caja Rural–Seguros RGA | 27 | 98 |
| 53 | David Arroyo | Spain | Caja Rural–Seguros RGA | 34 | 20 |
| 54 | Pello Bilbao | Spain | Caja Rural–Seguros RGA | 24 | 60 |
| 55 | Karol Domagalski | Poland | Caja Rural–Seguros RGA | 24 | 124 |
| 56 | Francesco Lasca | Italy | Caja Rural–Seguros RGA | 26 | 156 |
| 57 | Lluís Mas | Spain | Caja Rural–Seguros RGA | 25 | 121 |
| 58 | Antonio Piedra | Spain | Caja Rural–Seguros RGA | 29 | 99 |
| 59 | Amets Txurruka | Spain | Caja Rural–Seguros RGA | 31 | 48 |
| 61 | Peter Sagan | Slovakia | Cannondale | 24 | DNF-14 |
| 62 | George Bennett | New Zealand | Cannondale | 24 | 89 |
| 63 | Maciej Bodnar | Poland | Cannondale | 29 | 122 |
| 64 | Guillaume Boivin | Canada | Cannondale | 25 | 149 |
| 65 | Damiano Caruso | Italy | Cannondale | 26 | 9 |
| 66 | Alessandro De Marchi | Italy | Cannondale | 28 | 67 |
| 67 | Oscar Gatto | Italy | Cannondale | 29 | DNF-16 |
| 68 | Matthias Krizek | Austria | Cannondale | 25 | 125 |
| 69 | Paolo Longo Borghini | Italy | Cannondale | 33 | 101 |
| 71 | Daniel Navarro | Spain | Cofidis | 31 | 10 |
| 72 | Jérôme Coppel | France | Cofidis | 28 | 31 |
| 73 | Romain Hardy | France | Cofidis | 25 | 64 |
| 74 | Gert Jõeäär | Estonia | Cofidis | 27 | 152 |
| 75 | Christophe Le Mével | France | Cofidis | 33 | 22 |
| 76 | Guillaume Levarlet | France | Cofidis | 29 | 49 |
| 77 | Luis Ángel Maté | Spain | Cofidis | 30 | 19 |
| 78 | Yoann Bagot | France | Cofidis | 26 | 119 |
| 79 | Romain Zingle | Belgium | Cofidis | 27 | 83 |
| 81 | Romain Sicard | France | Team Europcar | 26 | 13 |
| 82 | Natnael Berhane | Eritrea | Team Europcar | 23 | 148 |
| 83 | Jérôme Cousin | France | Team Europcar | 25 | 78 |
| 84 | Dan Craven | Namibia | Team Europcar | 31 | 140 |
| 85 | Jimmy Engoulvent | France | Team Europcar | 34 | 157 |
| 86 | Vincent Jérôme | France | Team Europcar | 29 | 91 |
| 87 | Yannick Martinez | France | Team Europcar | 26 | 81 |
| 88 | Maxime Méderel | France | Team Europcar | 33 | 35 |
| 89 | Bryan Nauleau | France | Team Europcar | 26 | DNF-7 |
| 91 | Nacer Bouhanni | France | FDJ.fr | 24 | DNF-14 |
| 92 | Kenny Elissonde | France | FDJ.fr | 23 | DNF-13 |
| 93 | Murilo Fischer | Brazil | FDJ.fr | 35 | DNF-13 |
| 94 | Johan Le Bon | France | FDJ.fr | 23 | 79 |
| 95 | Laurent Mangel | France | FDJ.fr | 33 | 153 |
| 96 | Cédric Pineau | France | FDJ.fr | 29 | 77 |
| 97 | Thibaut Pinot | France | FDJ.fr | 24 | DNF-11 |
| 98 | Anthony Roux | France | FDJ.fr | 27 | DNF-15 |
| 99 | Geoffrey Soupe | France | FDJ.fr | 26 | 94 |
| 101 | Ryder Hesjedal | Canada | Garmin–Sharp | 33 | 24 |
| 102 | Dan Martin | Ireland | Garmin–Sharp | 28 | 7 |
| 103 | Koldo Fernández | Spain | Garmin–Sharp | 32 | 86 |
| 104 | Nathan Haas | Australia | Garmin–Sharp | 25 | 143 |
| 105 | Nate Brown | United States | Garmin–Sharp | 23 | 85 |
| 106 | André Cardoso | Portugal | Garmin–Sharp | 29 | 25 |
| 107 | David Millar | Great Britain | Garmin–Sharp | 37 | 144 |
| 108 | Andrew Talansky | United States | Garmin–Sharp | 25 | 51 |
| 109 | Johan Vansummeren | Belgium | Garmin–Sharp | 33 | 118 |
| 111 | Warren Barguil | France | Giant–Shimano | 22 | 8 |
| 112 | Nikias Arndt | Germany | Giant–Shimano | 22 | 102 |
| 113 | Lawson Craddock | United States | Giant–Shimano | 22 | DNF-14 |
| 114 | Koen de Kort | Netherlands | Giant–Shimano | 31 | DNF-18 |
| 115 | John Degenkolb | Germany | Giant–Shimano | 25 | 116 |
| 116 | Johannes Fröhlinger | Germany | Giant–Shimano | 29 | 97 |
| 117 | Chad Haga | United States | Giant–Shimano | 25 | 73 |
| 118 | Tobias Ludvigsson | Sweden | Giant–Shimano | 23 | 62 |
| 119 | Ramon Sinkeldam | Netherlands | Giant–Shimano | 25 | 136 |
| 121 | Marcel Aregger | Switzerland | IAM Cycling | 25 | 117 |
| 122 | Jonathan Fumeaux | Switzerland | IAM Cycling | 26 | 142 |
| 123 | Sébastien Hinault | France | IAM Cycling | 40 | 106 |
| 124 | Dominic Klemme | Germany | IAM Cycling | 27 | DNF-14 |
| 125 | Pirmin Lang | Switzerland | IAM Cycling | 29 | 146 |
| 126 | Matteo Pelucchi | Italy | IAM Cycling | 25 | DNF-15 |
| 127 | Vicente Reynés | Spain | IAM Cycling | 33 | 61 |
| 128 | Aleksejs Saramotins | Latvia | IAM Cycling | 32 | DNF-7 |
| 129 | Johann Tschopp | Switzerland | IAM Cycling | 32 | DNS-14 |
| 131 | Joaquim Rodríguez | Spain | Team Katusha | 35 | 4 |
| 132 | Giampaolo Caruso | Italy | Team Katusha | 34 | 15 |
| 133 | Sergey Chernetskiy | Russia | Team Katusha | 24 | 113 |
| 134 | Alexandr Kolobnev | Russia | Team Katusha | 33 | 40 |
| 135 | Dmitry Kozonchuk | Russia | Team Katusha | 30 | 95 |
| 136 | Alberto Losada | Spain | Team Katusha | 32 | 42 |
| 137 | Daniel Moreno | Spain | Team Katusha | 32 | 11 |
| 138 | Yuri Trofimov | Russia | Team Katusha | 30 | 72 |
| 139 | Eduard Vorganov | Russia | Team Katusha | 31 | 46 |
| 141 | Jurgen Van den Broeck | Belgium | Lotto–Belisol | 31 | DNF-13 |
| 142 | Sander Armée | Belgium | Lotto–Belisol | 28 | 103 |
| 143 | Vegard Breen | Norway | Lotto–Belisol | 24 | 129 |
| 144 | Bart De Clercq | Belgium | Lotto–Belisol | 27 | 34 |
| 145 | Jens Debusschere | Belgium | Lotto–Belisol | 24 | 107 |
| 146 | Adam Hansen | Australia | Lotto–Belisol | 33 | 53 |
| 147 | Greg Henderson | New Zealand | Lotto–Belisol | 37 | 133 |
| 148 | Pim Ligthart | Netherlands | Lotto–Belisol | 26 | 127 |
| 149 | Maxime Monfort | Belgium | Lotto–Belisol | 31 | 16 |
| 151 | Alejandro Valverde | Spain | Movistar Team | 34 | 3 |
| 152 | Andrey Amador | Costa Rica | Movistar Team | 27 | 30 |
| 153 | Jonathan Castroviejo | Spain | Movistar Team | 27 | 65 |
| 154 | Imanol Erviti | Spain | Movistar Team | 30 | 63 |
| 155 | José Herrada | Spain | Movistar Team | 28 | 32 |
| 156 | Gorka Izagirre | Spain | Movistar Team | 26 | 37 |
| 157 | Adriano Malori | Italy | Movistar Team | 26 | 114 |
| 158 | Javier Moreno | Spain | Movistar Team | 30 | 90 |
| 159 | Nairo Quintana | Colombia | Movistar Team | 24 | DNF-11 |
| 161 | Sergio Pardilla | Spain | MTN–Qhubeka | 30 | 17 |
| 162 | Gerald Ciolek | Germany | MTN–Qhubeka | 27 | 139 |
| 163 | Merhawi Kudus | Eritrea | MTN–Qhubeka | 20 | 92 |
| 164 | Louis Meintjes | South Africa | MTN–Qhubeka | 22 | 55 |
| 165 | Kristian Sbaragli | Italy | MTN–Qhubeka | 24 | 104 |
| 166 | Daniel Teklehaymanot | Eritrea | MTN–Qhubeka | 25 | 47 |
| 167 | Jay Thomson | South Africa | MTN–Qhubeka | 28 | 155 |
| 168 | Jaco Venter | South Africa | MTN–Qhubeka | 27 | 123 |
| 169 | Jacques Janse van Rensburg | South Africa | MTN–Qhubeka | 26 | 59 |
| 171 | Tom Boonen | Belgium | Omega Pharma–Quick-Step | 33 | DNS-18 |
| 172 | Gianluca Brambilla | Italy | Omega Pharma–Quick-Step | 27 | DSQ-16 |
| 173 | Nikolas Maes | Belgium | Omega Pharma–Quick-Step | 28 | 111 |
| 174 | Tony Martin | Germany | Omega Pharma–Quick-Step | 29 | DNF-15 |
| 175 | Wout Poels | Netherlands | Omega Pharma–Quick-Step | 26 | 38 |
| 176 | Pieter Serry | Belgium | Omega Pharma–Quick-Step | 25 | DNS-20 |
| 177 | Rigoberto Urán | Colombia | Omega Pharma–Quick-Step | 27 | DNS-17 |
| 178 | Martin Velits | Slovakia | Omega Pharma–Quick-Step | 29 | 130 |
| 179 | Carlos Verona | Spain | Omega Pharma–Quick-Step | 21 | 66 |
| 181 | Sam Bewley | New Zealand | Orica–GreenEDGE | 27 | 135 |
| 182 | Esteban Chaves | Colombia | Orica–GreenEDGE | 24 | 41 |
| 183 | Simon Clarke | Australia | Orica–GreenEDGE | 28 | 70 |
| 184 | Mitchell Docker | Australia | Orica–GreenEDGE | 27 | 147 |
| 185 | Brett Lancaster | Australia | Orica–GreenEDGE | 34 | DNF-13 |
| 186 | Michael Matthews | Australia | Orica–GreenEDGE | 23 | 75 |
| 187 | Cameron Meyer | Australia | Orica–GreenEDGE | 26 | DNS-18 |
| 188 | Ivan Santaromita | Italy | Orica–GreenEDGE | 30 | DNF-7 |
| 189 | Adam Yates | Great Britain | Orica–GreenEDGE | 22 | 82 |
| 191 | Chris Froome | Great Britain | Team Sky | 29 | 2 |
| 192 | Dario Cataldo | Italy | Team Sky | 29 | DNS-20 |
| 193 | Philip Deignan | Ireland | Team Sky | 30 | 39 |
| 194 | Peter Kennaugh | Great Britain | Team Sky | 25 | 71 |
| 195 | Vasil Kiryienka | Belarus | Team Sky | 33 | 110 |
| 196 | Christian Knees | Germany | Team Sky | 33 | DNS-17 |
| 197 | Mikel Nieve | Spain | Team Sky | 30 | 12 |
| 198 | Luke Rowe | Great Britain | Team Sky | 24 | 141 |
| 199 | Kanstantsin Sivtsov | Belarus | Team Sky | 32 | 43 |
| 201 | Alberto Contador | Spain | Tinkoff–Saxo | 31 | 1 |
| 202 | Michael Valgren | Denmark | Tinkoff–Saxo | 22 | 128 |
| 203 | Daniele Bennati | Italy | Tinkoff–Saxo | 33 | 108 |
| 204 | Jesús Hernández | Spain | Tinkoff–Saxo | 32 | 21 |
| 205 | Sérgio Paulinho | Portugal | Tinkoff–Saxo | 34 | 57 |
| 206 | Ivan Rovny | Russia | Tinkoff–Saxo | 26 | DSQ-16 |
| 207 | Chris Anker Sørensen | Denmark | Tinkoff–Saxo | 29 | 29 |
| 208 | Matteo Tosatto | Italy | Tinkoff–Saxo | 40 | 120 |
| 209 | Oliver Zaugg | Switzerland | Tinkoff–Saxo | 33 | 23 |
| 211 | Fabian Cancellara | Switzerland | Trek Factory Racing | 33 | DNS-18 |
| 212 | Julián Arredondo | Colombia | Trek Factory Racing | 26 | DNF-15 |
| 213 | Fabio Felline | Italy | Trek Factory Racing | 24 | 105 |
| 214 | Bob Jungels | Luxembourg | Trek Factory Racing | 21 | DNS-19 |
| 215 | Yaroslav Popovych | Ukraine | Trek Factory Racing | 34 | 115 |
| 216 | Jesse Sergent | New Zealand | Trek Factory Racing | 26 | 131 |
| 217 | Jasper Stuyven | Belgium | Trek Factory Racing | 22 | 88 |
| 218 | Kristof Vandewalle | Belgium | Trek Factory Racing | 29 | 87 |
| 219 | Haimar Zubeldia | Spain | Trek Factory Racing | 37 | DNS-17 |

== By nationality ==
The 198 riders that competed in the 2014 Vuelta a España represented 34 different countries.

| Country | No. of riders | Finishers | Stage wins |
|---|---|---|---|
| Argentina | 1 | 1 | |
| Australia | 9 | 7 | 2 (Adam Hansen, Michael Matthews) |
| Austria | 1 | 1 | |
| Belarus | 3 | 3 | |
| Belgium | 13 | 10 | |
| Brazil | 1 | 0 | |
| Canada | 2 | 2 | 1 (Ryder Hesjedal) |
| Colombia | 7 | 4 | 1 (Winner Anacona) |
| Costa Rica | 1 | 1 | |
| Denmark | 2 | 2 | |
| Eritrea | 3 | 3 | |
| Estonia | 2 | 1 | |
| France | 27 | 20 | 2 (Nacer Bouhanni x2) |
| Germany | 11 | 8 | 5 (John Degenkolb x4, Tony Martin) |
| Great Britain | 5 | 5 | |
| Ireland | 2 | 2 | |
| Italy | 26 | 20 | 4 (Fabio Aru x2, Alessandro De Marchi, Adriano Malori) |
| Kazakhstan | 3 | 2 | |
| Latvia | 1 | 0 | |
| Luxembourg | 1 | 0 | |
| Namibia | 1 | 1 | |
| Netherlands | 11 | 8 | |
| New Zealand | 4 | 4 | |
| Norway | 1 | 1 | |
| Poland | 3 | 3 | 1 (Przemysław Niemiec) |
| Portugal | 2 | 2 | |
| Russia | 6 | 5 | |
| Slovakia | 2 | 1 | |
| South Africa | 4 | 4 | |
| Spain | 28 | 27 | 4 (Alberto Contador x2, Daniel Navarro, Alejandro Valverde) |
| Sweden | 1 | 1 | |
| Switzerland | 8 | 5 | |
| Ukraine | 1 | 1 | |
| United States | 5 | 4 | |
| Total | 198 | 159 | |
