= 2014 Vuelta a Burgos =

2014 UCI Europe Tour

Race details
- Dates: 13–17 August
- Stages: 5
- Distance: 619.5 km (384.9 mi)
- Winning time: 15h 07' 09"

Results
Jersey awarded to the overall winner	Winner	Nairo Quintana (COL)	(Movistar Team)
	Second	Daniel Moreno (ESP)	(Team Katusha)
	Third	Janez Brajkovič (SLO)	(Astana)
Jersey awarded to the points classification winner	Points	Daniel Moreno (ESP)	(Team Katusha)
Jersey awarded to the mountains classification winner	Mountains	Nairo Quintana (COL)	(Movistar Team)
	Youth	Daan Olivier (NED)	(Giant–Shimano)
Jersey awarded to the sprints classification winner	Sprints	Lluís Mas (ESP)	(Caja Rural–Seguros RGA)
	Team	Astana	

The 2014 Vuelta a Burgos (English: 2014 Tour of Burgos) was the 36th edition of the Vuelta a Burgos, an annual bicycle stage race which toured the province of Burgos; it was held as part of the 2014 UCI Europe Tour, as a 2.HC classification event.

== Teams ==
A total of 12 teams raced in the 2014 Vuelta a Burgos: 5 UCI ProTeams, 5 UCI Professional Continental teams, and 2 UCI Continental teams.

- Ag2r–La Mondiale
- Astana
- Burgos BH
- Caja Rural–Seguros RGA
- Euskadi
- Giant–Shimano
- IAM Cycling
- Team Katusha
- Movistar Team
- MTN–Qhubeka
- Neri Sottoli
- RusVelo

== Route ==
Stage characteristics and winners
Stage	Date	Course	Distance	Type	Winner
1	13 August	Burgos to Burgos	143 km (89 mi)	Hilly stage	Juan José Lobato (ESP)
2	14 August	Briviesca to Villadiego	152 km (94 mi)	Hilly stage	Matteo Pelucchi (ITA)
3	15 August	Comunero de Revenga to Lagunas de Neila	170 km (106 mi)	Mountain stage	Nairo Quintana (COL)
4	16 August	Medina de Pomar to Villarcayo	142 km (88 mi)	Flat stage	Lloyd Mondory (FRA)
5	17 August	Aranda de Duero	12.5 km (8 mi)	Individual time trial	Aleksejs Saramotins (LAT)

== Stages ==
=== Stage 1 ===
13 August 2014 — Burgos to Burgos, 143 km (89 mi)

Stage 1 result and general classification after Stage 1
Rank	Rider	Team	Time
1	Juan José Lobato (ESP)	Movistar Team	3h 29' 37"
2	Daniel Moreno (ESP)	Team Katusha	+ 0"
3	Thomas Damuseau (FRA)	Giant–Shimano	+ 3"
4	Lloyd Mondory (FRA)	Ag2r–La Mondiale	+ 3"
5	Jonathan Fumeaux (SUI)	IAM Cycling	+ 3"
6	Rinaldo Nocentini (ITA)	Ag2r–La Mondiale	+ 5"
7	Daan Olivier (NED)	Giant–Shimano	+ 5"
8	Amets Txurruka (ESP)	Caja Rural–Seguros RGA	+ 5"
9	Sergey Lagutin (RUS)	RusVelo	+ 5"
10	Fredrik Kessiakoff (SWE)	Astana	+ 5"

=== Stage 2 ===
14 August 2014 — Briviesca to Villadiego, 152 km (94 mi)

Stage 2 result
Rank	Rider	Team	Time
1	Matteo Pelucchi (ITA)	IAM Cycling	3h 33' 43"
2	Steven Lammertink (NED)	Giant–Shimano	+ 0"
3	Thomas Damuseau (FRA)	Giant–Shimano	+ 0"
4	Vicente Reynés (ESP)	IAM Cycling	+ 0"
5	Valerio Agnoli (ITA)	Astana	+ 0"
6	Lloyd Mondory (FRA)	Ag2r–La Mondiale	+ 0"
7	Rafael Andriato (BRA)	Neri Sottoli	+ 0"
8	Linus Gerdemann (DEU)	MTN–Qhubeka	+ 0"
9	Aleksejs Saramotins (LAT)	IAM Cycling	+ 0"
10	Juan José Lobato (ESP)	Movistar Team	+ 0"

General classification after stage 2
Rank	Rider	Team	Time
1	Juan José Lobato (ESP)	Movistar Team	7h 03' 20"
2	Daniel Moreno (ESP)	Team Katusha	+ 0"
3	Thomas Damuseau (FRA)	Giant–Shimano	+ 3"
4	Lloyd Mondory (FRA)	Ag2r–La Mondiale	+ 3"
5	Jonathan Fumeaux (SUI)	IAM Cycling	+ 3"
6	Carlos Barbero (ESP)	Euskadi	+ 5"
7	Amets Txurruka (ESP)	Caja Rural–Seguros RGA	+ 5"
8	Daan Olivier (NED)	Giant–Shimano	+ 5"
9	Nairo Quintana (COL)	Movistar Team	+ 5"
10	Sergey Lagutin (RUS)	RusVelo	+ 5"

=== Stage 3 ===
15 August 2014 — Comunero de Revenga to Lagunas de Neila, 170 km (106 mi)

Stage 3 result
Rank	Rider	Team	Time
1	Nairo Quintana (COL)	Movistar Team	4h 27' 34"
2	Daniel Moreno (ESP)	Team Katusha	+ 6"
3	Mikel Landa (ESP)	Astana	+ 10"
4	David Arroyo (ESP)	Caja Rural–Seguros RGA	+ 19"
5	Janez Brajkovič (SLO)	Astana	+ 35"
6	Paolo Tiralongo (ITA)	Astana	+ 41"
DSQ	~~Matteo Rabottini~~ (ITA)	~~Neri Sottoli~~	~~+ 46"~~
8	Valerio Agnoli (ITA)	Astana	+ 48"
9	Pello Bilbao (ESP)	Caja Rural–Seguros RGA	+ 58"
10	Sergio Pardilla (ESP)	MTN–Qhubeka	+ 1' 07"

General classification after stage 3
Rank	Rider	Team	Time
1	Nairo Quintana (COL)	Movistar Team	11h 30' 59"
2	Daniel Moreno (ESP)	Team Katusha	+ 1"
3	David Arroyo (ESP)	Caja Rural–Seguros RGA	+ 37"
4	Janez Brajkovič (SLO)	Astana	+ 46"
5	Valerio Agnoli (ITA)	Astana	+ 52"
6	Paolo Tiralongo (ITA)	Astana	+ 59"
DSQ	~~Matteo Rabottini~~ (ITA)	~~Neri Sottoli~~	~~+ 1' 04"~~
8	Pello Bilbao (ESP)	Caja Rural–Seguros RGA	+ 1' 09"
9	Sergio Pardilla (ESP)	MTN–Qhubeka	+ 1' 13"
10	Daan Olivier (NED)	Giant–Shimano	+ 1' 34"

=== Stage 4 ===
16 August 2014 — Medina de Pomar to Villarcayo, 142 km (88 mi)

Stage 4 result
Rank	Rider	Team	Time
1	Lloyd Mondory (FRA)	Ag2r–La Mondiale	3h 21' 18"
2	Vicente Reynés (ESP)	IAM Cycling	+ 0"
3	Sébastien Turgot (FRA)	Ag2r–La Mondiale	+ 0"
4	Carlos Barbero (ESP)	Euskadi	+ 0"
5	Valerio Agnoli (ITA)	Astana	+ 0"
6	Thomas Damuseau (FRA)	Giant–Shimano	+ 0"
7	Youcef Reguigui (ALG)	MTN–Qhubeka	+ 0"
8	Ivan Balykin (RUS)	RusVelo	+ 0"
9	Daniel Moreno (ESP)	Team Katusha	+ 2"
10	Sergey Lagutin (RUS)	RusVelo	+ 2"

General classification after stage 4
Rank	Rider	Team	Time
1	Daniel Moreno (ESP)	Team Katusha	14h 52' 20"
2	Nairo Quintana (COL)	Movistar Team	+ 0"
3	David Arroyo (ESP)	Caja Rural–Seguros RGA	+ 37"
4	Janez Brajkovič (SLO)	Astana	+ 46"
5	Valerio Agnoli (ITA)	Astana	+ 49"
6	Paolo Tiralongo (ITA)	Astana	+ 59"
DSQ	~~Matteo Rabottini~~ (ITA)	~~Neri Sottoli~~	~~+ 1' 04"~~
8	Pello Bilbao (ESP)	Caja Rural–Seguros RGA	+ 1' 09"
9	Sergio Pardilla (ESP)	MTN–Qhubeka	+ 1' 13"
10	Daan Olivier (NED)	Giant–Shimano	+ 1' 34"

=== Stage 5 ===
17 August 2014 — Aranda de Duero, 12.5 km (8 mi), individual time trial (ITT)

Stage 5 result
Rank	Rider	Team	Time
1	Aleksejs Saramotins (LAT)	IAM Cycling	14' 48"
2	Nairo Quintana (COL)	Movistar Team	+ 1"
3	Imanol Erviti (ESP)	Movistar Team	+ 2"
4	Chad Haga (USA)	Giant–Shimano	+ 3"
5	Daniel Moreno (ESP)	Team Katusha	+ 4"
6	Rubén Plaza (ESP)	Movistar Team	+ 5"
7	Ilnur Zakarin (RUS)	RusVelo	+ 7"
8	Damien Gaudin (FRA)	Ag2r–La Mondiale	+ 8"
9	Artem Ovechkin (RUS)	RusVelo	+ 8"
10	Janez Brajkovič (SLO)	Astana	+ 10"

Final general classification
Rank	Rider	Team	Time
1	Nairo Quintana (COL)	Movistar Team	15h 07' 09"
2	Daniel Moreno (ESP)	Team Katusha	+ 3"
3	Janez Brajkovič (SLO)	Astana	+ 55"
DSQ	~~Matteo Rabottini~~ (ITA)	~~Neri Sottoli~~	~~+ 1' 32"~~
5	Sergio Pardilla (ESP)	MTN–Qhubeka	+ 1' 35"
6	Pello Bilbao (ESP)	Caja Rural–Seguros RGA	+ 1' 40"
7	Valerio Agnoli (ITA)	Astana	+ 1' 41"
8	Daan Olivier (NED)	Giant–Shimano	+ 1' 57"
9	Paolo Tiralongo (ITA)	Astana	+ 1' 58"
10	David Arroyo (ESP)	Caja Rural–Seguros RGA	+ 1' 59"

== Classification leadership ==
Stage	Winner	General classification	Points classification	Mountains classification	Sprints classification	Youth classification	Team classification
1	Juan José Lobato	Juan José Lobato	Juan José Lobato	Mirko Tedeschi	Lluís Mas	Daan Olivier	Movistar Team
2	Matteo Pelucchi	Juan José Lobato	Thomas Damuseau	Mirko Tedeschi	Lluís Mas	Daan Olivier	Movistar Team
3	Nairo Quintana	Nairo Quintana	Daniel Moreno	Nairo Quintana	Lluís Mas	Daan Olivier	Astana
4	Lloyd Mondory	Daniel Moreno	Lloyd Mondory	Nairo Quintana	Lluís Mas	Daan Olivier	Astana
5	Aleksejs Saramotins	Nairo Quintana	Daniel Moreno	Nairo Quintana	Lluís Mas	Daan Olivier	Astana
Final		Nairo Quintana	Daniel Moreno	Nairo Quintana	Lluís Mas	Daan Olivier	Astana
