= 2015 Kuurne–Brussels–Kuurne =

Race details
- Dates: 1 March
- Distance: 193 km (119.9 mi)
- Winning time: 4h 29' 00"

Results
	Winner	Mark Cavendish (GBR)	(Etixx–Quick-Step)
	Second	Alexander Kristoff (NOR)	(Team Katusha)
	Third	Elia Viviani (ITA)	(Team Sky)

The 2015 Kuurne–Brussels–Kuurne was the 67th edition of the Kuurne–Brussels–Kuurne cycling classic. It was run on 1 March 2015 and was rated as a 1.1 race as part of the 2015 UCI Europe Tour. The race was run over a 193-kilometre (120-mile) course, starting and finishing in Kuurne; despite the name, the race did not at any point enter Brussels. The race was the second race of the weekend that opened the traditional Belgian classics season following Omloop Het Nieuwsblad, held the previous day and won by Ian Stannard (Team Sky).

The race was won by Mark Cavendish (Etixx–Quick-Step) in a sprint finish, ahead of Alexander Kristoff (Team Katusha) and Elia Viviani (Team Sky). Cavendish's team had split the race on the Oude Kwaremont, but the race came back together due to a strong headwind. After Philippe Gilbert (BMC Racing Team) made a late attack, Team Katusha led the peloton in the final kilometres. Cavendish held Kristoff's wheel in the final kilometres and was able to come around him to take his second victory in the race, following his win in 2012.

== Results ==
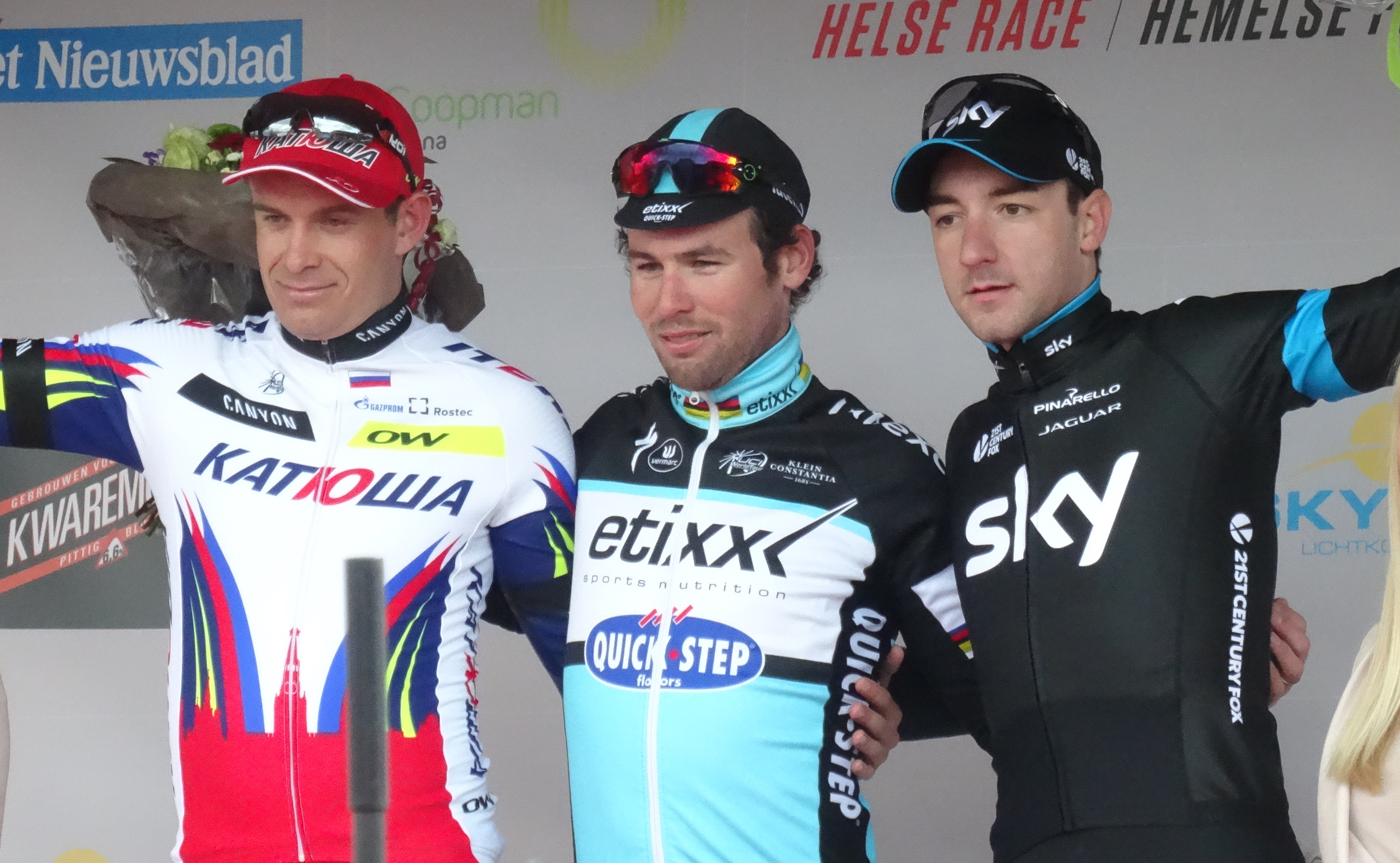
Cavendish (centre), Kristoff (left) and Viviani, the top three in the race

Result
Rank	Rider	Team	Time
1	Mark Cavendish (GBR)	Etixx–Quick-Step	4h 29' 00"
2	Alexander Kristoff (NOR)	Team Katusha	+ 0"
3	Elia Viviani (ITA)	Team Sky	+ 0"
4	Tom Van Asbroeck (BEL)	LottoNL–Jumbo	+ 0"
5	Daniele Colli (ITA)	Nippo–Vini Fantini	+ 0"
6	Jempy Drucker (LUX)	BMC Racing Team	+ 0"
7	Jens Debusschere (BEL)	Lotto–Soudal	+ 0"
8	Kristian Sbaragli (ITA)	MTN–Qhubeka	+ 0"
9	Raymond Kreder (NED)	Team Roompot	+ 0"
10	Matteo Pelucchi (ITA)	IAM Cycling	+ 0"
