= Daan Olivier =

Dutch cyclist (born 1992)

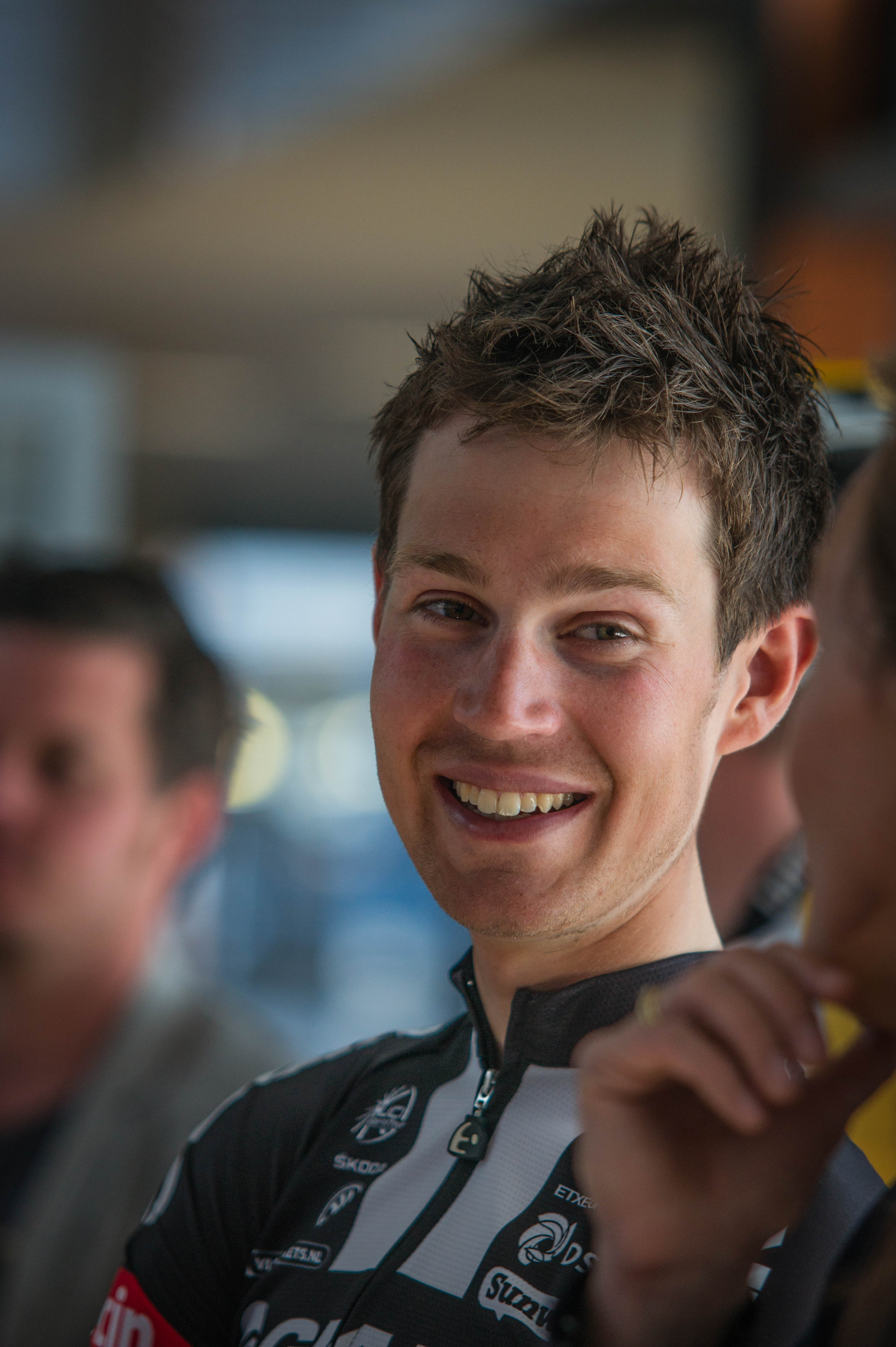

Personal information
- Full name: Daan Olivier
- Born: 24 November 1992 (age 33) Oegstgeest, Netherlands
- Height: 1.88 m (6 ft 2 in)
- Weight: 66 kg (146 lb)

Cycling career
- Sport: Cycling
- Current team: Retired
- Discipline: Road
- Role: Rider
- Rider type: Climber

Amateur teams
- 2011–2013: Rabobank Continental Team
- →2012: Rabobank (stagiaire)

Professional teams
- 2014–2015: Giant–Shimano
- 2017–2019: LottoNL–Jumbo

Daan Olivier (born 24 November 1992 in Oegstgeest) is a Dutch former cyclist, who rode professionally between 2014 and 2019 for the Team Giant–Alpecin and Team Jumbo–Visma squads. He competed at one Grand Tour, the 2017 Vuelta a España.

He was a member of the professional cycling team, Team Giant–Alpecin having come through the ranks at Rabobank Continental Team. He retired in June 2015, citing disillusionment with the sport, but returned in 2017 to race for LottoNL–Jumbo. He was forced to retire for a second time in 2019 due to a knee injury.

== Major results ==
2010
2nd Overall Liège–La Gleize

1st Stage 2 (TTT)

2nd Overall Grand Prix Rüebliland
7th Overall Driedaagse van Axel
2011
3rd Ronde van Limburg
8th Overall Tour du Gévaudan Languedoc-Roussillon
8th Grand Prix des Marbriers
10th Overall Istrian Spring Trophy
10th Overall Rhône-Alpes Isère Tour
2012
2nd Overall Tour de Gironde
3rd Road race, National Under-23 Road Championships
3rd Overall Tour de Bretagne

1st Young rider classification

4th Overall Tour de l'Ain

1st Young rider classification

5th Overall Thüringen Rundfahrt der U23

1st Young rider classification
1st Stage 1 (TTT)

8th Overall Tour Alsace
8th Overall Tour de l'Avenir
8th Liège–Bastogne–Liège Espoirs
10th Overall Istrian Spring Trophy
10th Overall Volta ao Alentejo
2013
2nd Paris–Tours Espoirs
4th Sluitingsprijs Zwevezele
2014
8th Overall Vuelta a Burgos

1st Young rider classification

=== Grand Tour general classification results timeline ===
Grand Tour	2017
Giro d'Italia	—
Tour de France	—
Vuelta a España	60

Legend
—	Did not compete
DNF	Did not finish
