= 2014 Bayern Rundfahrt =

2014 UCI Europe Tour
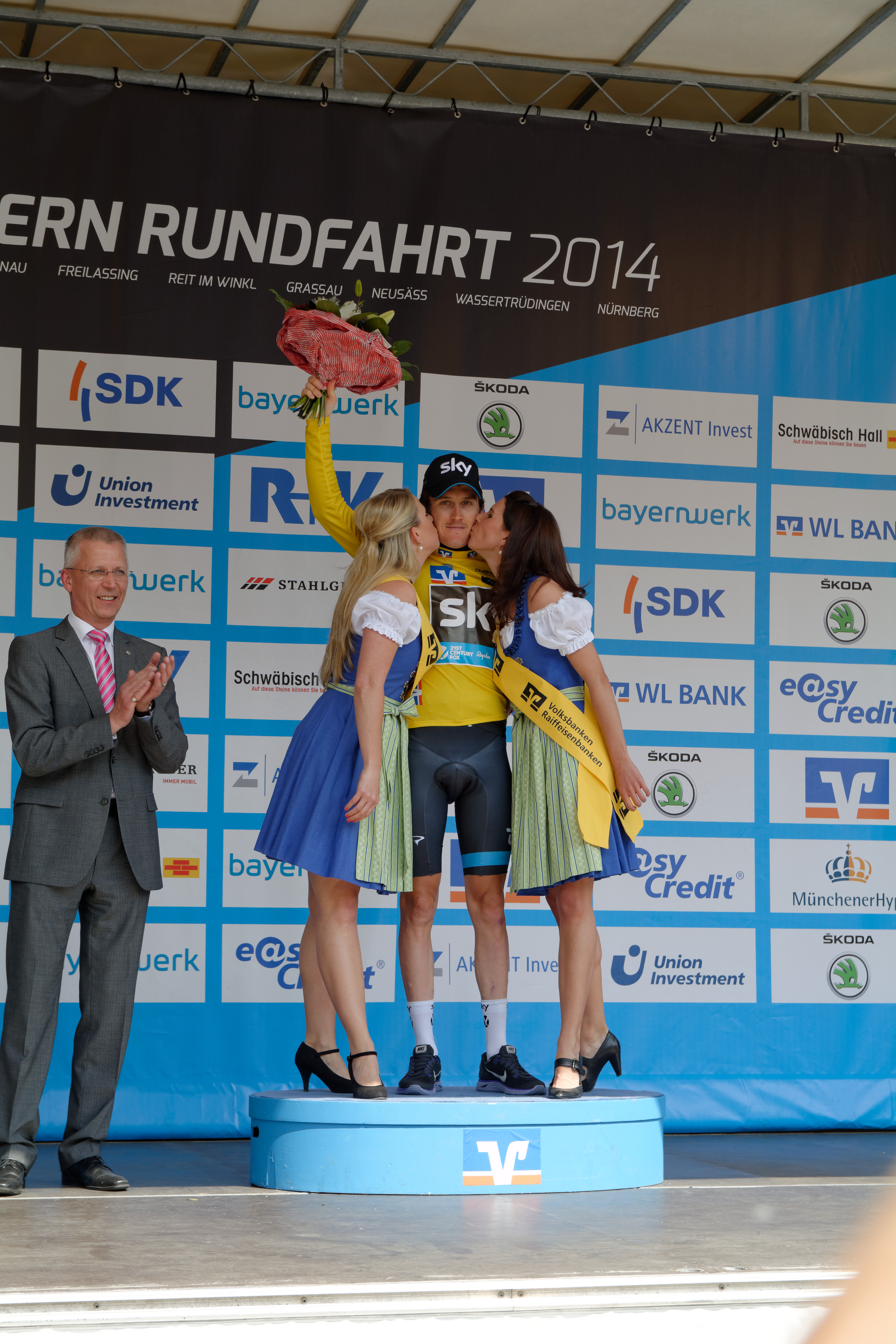
- Geraint Thomas in the leader's jersey

Race details
- Dates: 28 May – 1 June
- Stages: 5
- Distance: 787.9 km (489.6 mi)
- Winning time: 19h 17' 42"

Results
Jersey awarded to the overall winner	Winner	Geraint Thomas (GBR)	(Team Sky)
	Second	Mathias Frank (SUI)	(IAM Cycling)
	Third	Vasil Kiryienka (BLR)	(Team Sky)
	Mountains	Christian Meier (CAN)	(Orica–GreenEDGE)
Jersey awarded to the youth classification winner	Youth	Thibaut Pinot (FRA)	(FDJ.fr)
Jersey awarded to the sprints classification winner	Sprints	Sam Bennett (IRL)	(NetApp–Endura)
	Team	Team Sky	

The 2014 Bayern Rundfahrt was the 35th edition of the Bayern Rundfahrt, an annual cycling road race. It was held between 28 May and 1 June, consisting of five stages, the fourth being an individual time trial. The stage race was part of the 2014 UCI Europe Tour, and was rated as a 2.HC event.

The race was won for the second time – having won the race in 2011 – by Geraint Thomas of Team Sky, who claimed the leader's jersey by winning the time trial stage. Mathias Frank (IAM Cycling) was second and Thomas' teammate Vasil Kiryienka completed the podium.

== Schedule ==
Stage	Date	Course	Distance	Type	Winner	Ref
1	28 May	Vilshofen an der Donau to Freilassing	204.6 km (127.1 mi)	Hilly stage	Heinrich Haussler (AUS)	
2	29 May	Freilassing to Reit im Winkl–Winklmoos-Alm	164.7 km (102.3 mi)	Mountain stage	Mathias Frank (SUI)	
3	30 May	Grassau to Neusäß	233.5 km (145.1 mi)	Hilly stage	Daryl Impey (RSA)	
4	31 May	Wassertrüdingen to Wassertrüdingen	25.5 km (15.8 mi)	Individual time trial	Geraint Thomas (GBR)	
5	1 June	Wassertrüdingen to Nürnberg	159.6 km (99.2 mi)	Flat stage	Sam Bennett (IRL)	
Total		787.9 km (489.6 mi)				

== Teams ==
A total of 19 teams took part in the race. 8 were ProTeams, 6 were Professional Continental Teams and 5 were Continental Teams.

ProTeams

- Ag2r–La Mondiale
- FDJ.fr
- Garmin–Sharp
- Giant–Shimano
- Team Katusha
- Orica–GreenEDGE
- Team Sky
- Trek Factory Racing

Professional Continental Teams

- Bretagne–Séché Environnement
- Caja Rural–Seguros RGA
- CCC–Polsat–Polkowice
- IAM Cycling
- MTN–Qhubeka
- NetApp–Endura

Continental Teams

- Team Heizomat
- LKT Team Brandenburg
- Rad-Net Rose Team
- Team Stölting
- Team Stuttgart

== Stages ==
=== Stage 1 ===
28 May 2014 — Vilshofen an der Donau to Freilassing, 204.6 km (127.1 mi)

Stage 1 result

	Rider	Team	Time
1	Heinrich Haussler (AUS)	IAM Cycling	5h 11' 38"
2	Yauheni Hutarovich (BLR)	Ag2r–La Mondiale	s.t.
3	Steele Von Hoff (AUS)	Garmin–Sharp	s.t.
4	Sam Bennett (IRL)	NetApp–Endura	s.t.
5	Roger Kluge (GER)	IAM Cycling	s.t.
6	Nikias Arndt (GER)	Giant–Shimano	s.t.
7	Alexander Krieger (GER)	Team Stuttgart	s.t.
8	Luke Rowe (GBR)	Team Sky	s.t.
9	Alexey Tsatevich (RUS)	Team Katusha	s.t.
10	Willi Willwohl (GER)	LKT Team Brandenburg	s.t.

General Classification after Stage 1

	Rider	Team	Time
1	Heinrich Haussler (AUS)	IAM Cycling	5h 11' 28"
2	Jan-Niklas Droste (GER)	Team Heizomat	+ 1"
3	Yauheni Hutarovich (BLR)	Ag2r–La Mondiale	+ 4"
4	Steele Von Hoff (AUS)	Garmin–Sharp	+ 6"
5	Arthur Vichot (FRA)	FDJ.fr	+ 9"
6	Sam Bennett (IRL)	NetApp–Endura	+ 10"
7	Roger Kluge (GER)	IAM Cycling	+ 10"
8	Nikias Arndt (GER)	Giant–Shimano	+ 10"
9	Alexander Krieger (GER)	Team Stuttgart	+ 10"
10	Luke Rowe (GBR)	Team Sky	+ 10"

=== Stage 2 ===
29 May 2014 — Freilassing to Reit im Winkl–Winklmoos-Alm, 164.7 km (102.3 mi)

Stage 2 result

	Rider	Team	Time
1	Mathias Frank (SUI)	IAM Cycling	4h 19' 24"
2	Thibaut Pinot (FRA)	FDJ.fr	+ 8"
3	Leopold König (CZE)	NetApp–Endura	+ 8"
4	Romain Bardet (FRA)	Ag2r–La Mondiale	+ 16"
5	Johann Tschopp (SUI)	IAM Cycling	+ 16"
6	Geraint Thomas (GBR)	Team Sky	+ 16"
7	Brice Feillu (FRA)	Bretagne–Séché Environnement	+ 26"
8	Eduardo Sepúlveda (ARG)	Bretagne–Séché Environnement	+ 28"
9	Vasil Kiryienka (BLR)	Team Sky	+ 39"
10	Ben Gastauer (LUX)	Ag2r–La Mondiale	+ 50"

General Classification after Stage 2

	Rider	Team	Time
1	Mathias Frank (SUI)	IAM Cycling	9h 31' 02"
2	Thibaut Pinot (FRA)	FDJ.fr	+ 5"
3	Leopold König (CZE)	NetApp–Endura	+ 8"
4	Romain Bardet (FRA)	Ag2r–La Mondiale	+ 16"
5	Geraint Thomas (GBR)	Team Sky	+ 16"
6	Johann Tschopp (SUI)	IAM Cycling	+ 16"
7	Brice Feillu (FRA)	Bretagne–Séché Environnement	+ 26"
8	Vasil Kiryienka (BLR)	Team Sky	+ 39"
9	Ben Gastauer (LUX)	Ag2r–La Mondiale	+ 50"
10	Marcel Wyss (SUI)	IAM Cycling	+ 52"

=== Stage 3 ===
30 May 2014 — Grassau to Neusäß, 233.5 km (145.1 mi)

Stage 3 result

	Rider	Team	Time
1	Daryl Impey (RSA)	Orica–GreenEDGE	5h 43' 58"
2	Reinardt Janse van Rensburg (RSA)	Giant–Shimano	s.t.
3	Alexander Porsev (RUS)	Team Katusha	s.t.
4	Phil Bauhaus (GER)	Team Stölting	s.t.
5	Heinrich Haussler (AUS)	IAM Cycling	s.t.
6	Raymond Kreder (NED)	Garmin–Sharp	s.t.
7	Gerald Ciolek (GER)	MTN–Qhubeka	s.t.
8	Davide Viganò (ITA)	Caja Rural–Seguros RGA	s.t.
9	Yauheni Hutarovich (BLR)	Ag2r–La Mondiale	s.t.
10	Alexander Krieger (GER)	Team Stuttgart	s.t.

General Classification after Stage 3

	Rider	Team	Time
1	Mathias Frank (SUI)	IAM Cycling	15h 15' 00"
2	Thibaut Pinot (FRA)	FDJ.fr	+ 5"
3	Leopold König (CZE)	NetApp–Endura	+ 8"
4	Geraint Thomas (GBR)	Team Sky	+ 14"
5	Romain Bardet (FRA)	Ag2r–La Mondiale	+ 16"
6	Johann Tschopp (SUI)	IAM Cycling	+ 16"
7	Brice Feillu (FRA)	Bretagne–Séché Environnement	+ 26"
8	Vasil Kiryienka (BLR)	Team Sky	+ 39"
9	Ben Gastauer (LUX)	Ag2r–La Mondiale	+ 50"
10	Davide Rebellin (ITA)	CCC–Polsat–Polkowice	+ 52"

=== Stage 4 ===
31 May 2014 — Wassertrüdingen, 25.5 km (15.8 mi), individual time trial (ITT)

Stage 4 result

	Rider	Team	Time
1	Geraint Thomas (GBR)	Team Sky	30' 48"
2	Jan Bárta (CZE)	NetApp–Endura	+ 4"
3	Anton Vorobyev (RUS)	Team Katusha	+ 5"
4	Vasil Kiryienka (BLR)	Team Sky	+ 10"
5	Kristof Vandewalle (BEL)	Trek Factory Racing	+ 26"
6	Mathias Frank (SUI)	IAM Cycling	+ 33"
7	Jack Bauer (NZL)	Garmin–Sharp	+ 38"
8	Jan-Niklas Droste (GER)	Team Heizomat	+ 44"
9	Daryl Impey (RSA)	Orica–GreenEDGE	+ 45"
10	Leopold König (CZE)	NetApp–Endura	+ 49"

General Classification after Stage 4

	Rider	Team	Time
1	Geraint Thomas (GBR)	Team Sky	15h 46' 02"
2	Mathias Frank (SUI)	IAM Cycling	+ 19"
3	Vasil Kiryienka (BLR)	Team Sky	+ 35"
4	Leopold König (CZE)	NetApp–Endura	+ 43"
5	Thibaut Pinot (FRA)	FDJ.fr	+ 1' 10"
6	Jan Bárta (CZE)	NetApp–Endura	+ 1' 35"
7	Daryl Impey (RSA)	Orica–GreenEDGE	+ 1' 38"
8	Johann Tschopp (SUI)	IAM Cycling	+ 1' 58"
9	Marcel Wyss (SUI)	IAM Cycling	+ 2' 00"
10	Peter Kennaugh (GBR)	Team Sky	+ 2' 04"

=== Stage 5 ===
1 June 2014 — Wassertrüdingen to Nürnberg, 159.6 km (99.2 mi)

Stage 5 result

	Rider	Team	Time
1	Sam Bennett (IRL)	NetApp–Endura	3h 31' 40"
2	Yauheni Hutarovich (BLR)	Ag2r–La Mondiale	s.t.
3	Raymond Kreder (NED)	Garmin–Sharp	s.t.
4	Alexander Porsev (RUS)	Team Katusha	s.t.
5	Phil Bauhaus (GER)	Team Stölting	s.t.
6	Heinrich Haussler (AUS)	IAM Cycling	s.t.
7	Andreas Stauff (GER)	MTN–Qhubeka	s.t.
8	Nikias Arndt (GER)	Giant–Shimano	s.t.
9	Henning Bommel (GER)	Rad-Net Rose Team	s.t.
10	Davide Viganò (ITA)	Caja Rural–Seguros RGA	s.t.

Final General Classification

	Rider	Team	Time
1	Geraint Thomas (GBR)	Team Sky	19h 17' 42"
2	Mathias Frank (SUI)	IAM Cycling	+ 19"
3	Vasil Kiryienka (BLR)	Team Sky	+ 35"
4	Leopold König (CZE)	NetApp–Endura	+ 43"
5	Thibaut Pinot (FRA)	FDJ.fr	+ 1' 10"
6	Jan Bárta (CZE)	NetApp–Endura	+ 1' 35"
7	Daryl Impey (RSA)	Orica–GreenEDGE	+ 1' 38"
8	Johann Tschopp (SUI)	IAM Cycling	+ 1' 58"
9	Marcel Wyss (SUI)	IAM Cycling	+ 2' 00"
10	Peter Kennaugh (GBR)	Team Sky	+ 2' 04"

== Classification leadership table ==
Stage	Winner	General classification	Sprints classification	Mountains classification	Young rider classification	Teams classification
1	Heinrich Haussler	Heinrich Haussler	Jan-Niklas Droste	Julian Kern	Jan-Niklas Droste	IAM Cycling
2	Mathias Frank	Mathias Frank	Jan-Niklas Droste	Christian Meier	Thibaut Pinot	IAM Cycling
3	Daryl Impey	Mathias Frank	Jan-Niklas Droste	Christian Meier	Thibaut Pinot	IAM Cycling
4	Geraint Thomas	Geraint Thomas	Jan-Niklas Droste	Christian Meier	Thibaut Pinot	Team Sky
5	Sam Bennett	Geraint Thomas	Sam Bennett	Christian Meier	Thibaut Pinot	Team Sky
Final		Geraint Thomas	Sam Bennett	Christian Meier	Thibaut Pinot	Team Sky

== Standings ==
=== General classification ===
	Rider	Team	Time
1	Geraint Thomas (GBR)	Team Sky	19h 17' 42"
2	Mathias Frank (SUI)	IAM Cycling	+ 19"
3	Vasil Kiryienka (BLR)	Team Sky	+ 35"
4	Leopold König (CZE)	NetApp–Endura	+ 43"
5	Thibaut Pinot (FRA)	FDJ.fr	+ 1' 10"
6	Jan Bárta (CZE)	NetApp–Endura	+ 1' 35"
7	Daryl Impey (RSA)	Orica–GreenEDGE	+ 1' 38"
8	Johann Tschopp (SUI)	IAM Cycling	+ 1' 58"
9	Marcel Wyss (SUI)	IAM Cycling	+ 2' 00"
10	Peter Kennaugh (GBR)	Team Sky	+ 2' 04"

=== Sprints classification ===
	Rider	Team	Points
1	Sam Bennett (IRL)	NetApp–Endura	13
2	Jan-Niklas Droste (GER)	Team Heizomat	9
3	Ben Gastauer (LUX)	Ag2r–La Mondiale	8

=== Mountains classification ===
	Rider	Team	Points
1	Christian Meier (CAN)	Orica–GreenEDGE	12
2	Julian Kern (GER)	Ag2r–La Mondiale	8
3	Jens Voigt (GER)	Trek Factory Racing	7

=== Young rider classification ===
	Rider	Team	Time
1	Thibaut Pinot (FRA)	FDJ.fr	19h 18' 52"
2	Romain Bardet (FRA)	Ag2r–La Mondiale	+ 1' 20"
3	Eduardo Sepúlveda (ARG)	Bretagne–Séché Environnement	+ 1' 25"

=== Teams classification ===
	Team	Time
1	Team Sky	57h 55' 18"
2	IAM Cycling	+ 1' 28"
3	Bretagne–Séché Environnement	+ 3' 11"
