= 2014 Tirreno–Adriatico =

2014 UCI World Tour, race 3 of 28

Race details
- Dates: 12–18 March 2014
- Stages: 7
- Distance: 1,034.6 km (642.9 mi)
- Winning time: 25h 28' 45"

Results
Jersey awarded to the overall winner	Winner	Alberto Contador (Spain)	(Tinkoff–Saxo)
	Second	Nairo Quintana (Colombia)	(Movistar Team)
	Third	Roman Kreuziger (Czech Republic)	(Tinkoff–Saxo)
Jersey awarded to the points classification winner	Points	Peter Sagan (Slovakia)	(Cannondale)
Jersey awarded to the mountains classification winner	Mountains	Marco Canola (Italy)	(Bardiani–CSF)
Jersey awarded to the young rider classification winner	Young rider	Nairo Quintana (Colombia)	(Movistar Team)
	Team	Ag2r–La Mondiale	

The 2014 Tirreno–Adriatico was the 49th edition of the Tirreno–Adriatico cycling stage race, often known as the Race of the Two Seas. It started on 12 March in Donoratico and ended on 18 March in San Benedetto del Tronto. It consisted of seven stages, including a team time trial to begin the race and an individual time trial to conclude it. It was the third race of the 2014 UCI World Tour season.

The race was won by Spain's Alberto Contador of Tinkoff–Saxo, who took the lead after winning his second successive stage on the fifth stage. This was following on from a win in the race's queen stage to Cittareale. Contador held the lead until the finish in San Benedetto del Tronto and became the first Spanish rider to win the race since Óscar Freire in 2005. He won the general classification by two minutes and five seconds over runner-up Nairo Quintana of the Movistar Team, while Contador's teammate Roman Kreuziger completed the podium, nine seconds behind Quintana and two minutes and fourteen seconds down on Contador.

In the race's other classifications, Cannondale's Peter Sagan was the winner of the red jersey for the points classification. He amassed the highest number of points during stages at intermediate sprints and stage finishes. Meanwhile, Marco Canola became the winner of the mountains classification for the Bardiani–CSF team. Quintana also won the white jersey for the young rider classification, as he was the highest placed rider born in 1989 or later. Whereas, the Ag2r–La Mondiale squad won the team classification, placing riders Jean-Christophe Péraud and Domenico Pozzovivo inside the top ten overall.

The final time trial was almost irrelevant from the winner's point of view as Alberto Contador had more than two minutes in hand on next best placed rider Nairo Quintana of the Movistar Team. There were some changes further down the GC as a result of the time trial though as Jean-Christophe Péraud moved above Julián Arredondo into 4th place and Michele Scarponi moved up to the top ten as a result of a strong ride.

== Race overview ==
Stage	Date	Course	Distance	Type	Winner
1	12 March	Donoratico to San Vincenzo	18.5 km (11.5 mi)	Team time trial	Omega Pharma–Quick-Step
2	13 March	San Vincenzo to Cascina	166 km (103.1 mi)	Flat stage	Matteo Pelucchi (ITA)
3	14 March	Cascina to Arezzo	212 km (131.7 mi)	Flat stage	Peter Sagan (SVK)
4	15 March	Indicatore to Cittareale	244 km (151.6 mi)	Mountain stage	Alberto Contador (ESP)
5	16 March	Amatrice to Guardiagrele	192 km (119.3 mi)	Mountain stage	Alberto Contador (ESP)
6	17 March	Bucchianico to Porto Sant'Elpidio	193 km (119.9 mi)	Intermediate stage	Mark Cavendish (GBR)
7	18 March	San Benedetto del Tronto	9.1 km (5.7 mi)	Individual time trial	Adriano Malori (ITA)

== Teams ==
As Tirreno–Adriatico was a UCI World Tour event, all 18 UCI ProTeams were invited automatically and obligated to send a squad. Four other squads were given wildcard places in the race, completing the 22-team peloton.

The 22 teams that competed in the race are:

- Ag2r–La Mondiale
- Astana
- Bardiani–CSF
- Belkin Pro Cycling
- BMC Racing Team
- Cannondale
- FDJ.fr
- Garmin–Sharp
- Giant–Shimano
- IAM Cycling
- Team Katusha
- Lampre–Merida
- Lotto–Belisol
- Movistar Team
- MTN–Qhubeka
- NetApp–Endura
- Omega Pharma–Quick-Step
- Orica–GreenEDGE
- Team Sky
- Tinkoff–Saxo
- Trek Factory Racing

== Stages ==
=== Stage 1 ===
12 March 2014 — Donoratico to San Vincenzo, 18.5 km (11.5 mi) team time trial (TTT)

Stage 1 Result

	Team	Time
1	Omega Pharma–Quick-Step	20' 13"
2	Orica–GreenEDGE	+ 11"
3	Movistar Team	+ 18"
4	Tinkoff–Saxo	+ 24"
5	Cannondale	+ 26"
6	Team Sky	+ 27"
7	Lotto–Belisol	+ 28"
8	Trek Factory Racing	+ 36"
9	Belkin Pro Cycling	+ 37"
10	FDJ.fr	+ 43"

General Classification after Stage 1

	Rider	Team	Time
1	Mark Cavendish (GBR)	Omega Pharma–Quick-Step	20' 13"
2	Michał Kwiatkowski (POL)	Omega Pharma–Quick-Step	+ 0"
3	Rigoberto Urán (COL)	Omega Pharma–Quick-Step	+ 0"
4	Mark Renshaw (AUS)	Omega Pharma–Quick-Step	+ 0"
5	Wout Poels (NED)	Omega Pharma–Quick-Step	+ 0"
6	Alessandro Petacchi (ITA)	Omega Pharma–Quick-Step	+ 2"
7	Tony Martin (GER)	Omega Pharma–Quick-Step	+ 3"
8	Daryl Impey (RSA)	Orica–GreenEDGE	+ 11"
9	Simon Clarke (AUS)	Orica–GreenEDGE	+ 11"
10	Luke Durbridge (AUS)	Orica–GreenEDGE	+ 11"

=== Stage 2 ===
13 March 2014 — San Vincenzo to Cascina, 166 km (103.1 mi)

Stage 2 Result

	Rider	Team	Time
1	Matteo Pelucchi (ITA)	IAM Cycling	3h 56' 12"
2	Arnaud Démare (FRA)	FDJ.fr	s.t.
3	André Greipel (GER)	Lotto–Belisol	s.t.
4	Sam Bennett (IRL)	NetApp–Endura	s.t.
5	Peter Sagan (SVK)	Cannondale	s.t.
6	Davide Appollonio (ITA)	Ag2r–La Mondiale	s.t.
7	Filippo Fortin (ITA)	Bardiani–CSF	s.t.
8	Sacha Modolo (ITA)	Lampre–Merida	s.t.
9	Tony Hurel (FRA)	Team Europcar	s.t.
10	Kristian Sbaragli (ITA)	MTN–Qhubeka	s.t.

General Classification after Stage 2

	Rider	Team	Time
1	Mark Cavendish (GBR)	Omega Pharma–Quick-Step	4h 16' 25"
2	Michał Kwiatkowski (POL)	Omega Pharma–Quick-Step	+ 0"
3	Rigoberto Urán (COL)	Omega Pharma–Quick-Step	+ 0"
4	Mark Renshaw (AUS)	Omega Pharma–Quick-Step	+ 0"
5	Alessandro Petacchi (ITA)	Omega Pharma–Quick-Step	+ 2"
6	Tony Martin (GER)	Omega Pharma–Quick-Step	+ 3"
7	Simon Clarke (AUS)	Orica–GreenEDGE	+ 11"
8	Daryl Impey (RSA)	Orica–GreenEDGE	+ 11"
9	Svein Tuft (CAN)	Orica–GreenEDGE	+ 11"
10	Ivan Santaromita (ITA)	Orica–GreenEDGE	+ 11"

=== Stage 3 ===
14 March 2014 — Cascina to Arezzo, 212 km (131.7 mi)

Stage 3 Result

	Rider	Team	Time
1	Peter Sagan (SVK)	Cannondale	5h 10' 17"
2	Michał Kwiatkowski (POL)	Omega Pharma–Quick-Step	s.t.
3	Simon Clarke (AUS)	Orica–GreenEDGE	s.t.
4	Philippe Gilbert (BEL)	BMC Racing Team	s.t.
5	Daryl Impey (RSA)	Orica–GreenEDGE	s.t.
6	Daniele Bennati (ITA)	Tinkoff–Saxo	s.t.
7	André Greipel (GER)	Lotto–Belisol	s.t.
8	Simon Geschke (GER)	Giant–Shimano	s.t.
9	Rinaldo Nocentini (ITA)	Ag2r–La Mondiale	+ 4"
10	Lloyd Mondory (FRA)	Ag2r–La Mondiale	+ 4"

General Classification after Stage 3

	Rider	Team	Time
1	Michał Kwiatkowski (POL)	Omega Pharma–Quick-Step	9h 26' 36"
2	Rigoberto Urán (COL)	Omega Pharma–Quick-Step	+ 10"
3	Simon Clarke (AUS)	Orica–GreenEDGE	+ 13"
4	Tony Martin (GER)	Omega Pharma–Quick-Step	+ 15"
5	Daryl Impey (RSA)	Orica–GreenEDGE	+ 17"
6	Peter Sagan (SVK)	Cannondale	+ 22"
7	André Greipel (GER)	Lotto–Belisol	+ 30"
8	Daniele Bennati (ITA)	Tinkoff–Saxo	+ 30"
9	Luke Durbridge (AUS)	Orica–GreenEDGE	+ 31"
10	Cameron Meyer (AUS)	Orica–GreenEDGE	+ 31"

=== Stage 4 ===
15 March 2014 — Indicatore to Cittareale, 244 km (151.6 mi)

Stage 4 Result

	Rider	Team	Time
1	Alberto Contador (ESP)	Tinkoff–Saxo	6h 39' 56"
2	Nairo Quintana (COL)	Movistar Team	+ 1"
3	Daniel Moreno (ESP)	Team Katusha	+ 5"
4	Roman Kreuziger (CZE)	Tinkoff–Saxo	+ 5"
5	Richie Porte (AUS)	Team Sky	+ 5"
6	Michele Scarponi (ITA)	Astana	+ 8"
7	Michał Kwiatkowski (POL)	Omega Pharma–Quick-Step	+ 10"
8	Robert Kišerlovski (CRO)	Trek Factory Racing	+ 11"
9	Chris Horner (USA)	Lampre–Merida	+ 11"
10	Giampaolo Caruso (ITA)	Team Katusha	+ 17"

General Classification after Stage 4

	Rider	Team	Time
1	Michał Kwiatkowski (POL)	Omega Pharma–Quick-Step	16h 06' 42"
2	Alberto Contador (ESP)	Tinkoff–Saxo	+ 16"
3	Nairo Quintana (COL)	Movistar Team	+ 23"
4	Richie Porte (AUS)	Team Sky	+ 34"
5	Rigoberto Urán (COL)	Omega Pharma–Quick-Step	+ 38"
6	Roman Kreuziger (CZE)	Tinkoff–Saxo	+ 39"
7	Robert Kišerlovski (CRO)	Trek Factory Racing	+ 49"
8	Moreno Moser (ITA)	Cannondale	+ 1' 01"
9	Mikel Nieve (ESP)	Team Sky	+ 1' 02"
10	Julián Arredondo (COL)	Trek Factory Racing	+ 1' 03"

=== Stage 5 ===
16 March 2014 — Amatrice to Guardiagrele, 192 km (119.3 mi)

Stage 5 Result

	Rider	Team	Time
1	Alberto Contador (ESP)	Tinkoff–Saxo	4h 54' 42"
2	Simon Geschke (GER)	Giant–Shimano	+ 6"
3	Ben King (USA)	Garmin–Sharp	+ 45"
4	Adam Hansen (AUS)	Lotto–Belisol	+ 1' 01"
5	Jean-Christophe Péraud (FRA)	Ag2r–La Mondiale	+ 1' 26"
6	Giampaolo Caruso (ITA)	Team Katusha	+ 1' 39"
7	Roman Kreuziger (CZE)	Tinkoff–Saxo	+ 1' 42"
8	Domenico Pozzovivo (ITA)	Ag2r–La Mondiale	+ 1' 42"
9	Julián Arredondo (COL)	Trek Factory Racing	+ 1' 42"
10	Rinaldo Nocentini (ITA)	Ag2r–La Mondiale	+ 1' 42"

General Classification after Stage 5

	Rider	Team	Time
1	Alberto Contador (ESP)	Tinkoff–Saxo	21h 01' 30"
2	Nairo Quintana (COL)	Movistar Team	+ 2' 08"
3	Roman Kreuziger (CZE)	Tinkoff–Saxo	+ 2' 15"
4	Julián Arredondo (COL)	Trek Factory Racing	+ 2' 39"
5	Jean-Christophe Péraud (FRA)	Ag2r–La Mondiale	+ 2' 40"
6	Mikel Nieve (ESP)	Team Sky	+ 2' 50"
7	Daniel Moreno (ESP)	Team Katusha	+ 2' 51"
8	Domenico Pozzovivo (ITA)	Ag2r–La Mondiale	+ 2' 56"
9	Giampaolo Caruso (ITA)	Team Katusha	+ 2' 58"
10	Robert Kišerlovski (CRO)	Trek Factory Racing	+ 3' 06"

=== Stage 6 ===
17 March 2014 — Bucchianico to Porto Sant'Elpidio, 193 km (119.9 mi)

Stage 6 Result

	Rider	Team	Time
1	Mark Cavendish (GBR)	Omega Pharma–Quick-Step	4h 16' 15"
2	Alessandro Petacchi (ITA)	Omega Pharma–Quick-Step	s.t.
3	Peter Sagan (SVK)	Cannondale	s.t.
4	Arnaud Démare (FRA)	FDJ.fr	s.t.
5	Tony Hurel (FRA)	Team Europcar	s.t.
6	Robert Wagner (GER)	Belkin Pro Cycling	s.t.
7	Kristian Sbaragli (ITA)	MTN–Qhubeka	s.t.
8	Bartosz Huzarski (POL)	NetApp–Endura	s.t.
9	Mark Renshaw (AUS)	Omega Pharma–Quick-Step	s.t.
10	Davide Appollonio (ITA)	Ag2r–La Mondiale	s.t.

General Classification after Stage 6

	Rider	Team	Time
1	Alberto Contador (ESP)	Tinkoff–Saxo	25h 17' 51"
2	Nairo Quintana (COL)	Movistar Team	+ 2' 08"
3	Roman Kreuziger (CZE)	Tinkoff–Saxo	+ 2' 15"
4	Julián Arredondo (COL)	Trek Factory Racing	+ 2' 39"
5	Jean-Christophe Péraud (FRA)	Ag2r–La Mondiale	+ 2' 40"
6	Mikel Nieve (ESP)	Team Sky	+ 2' 50"
7	Daniel Moreno (ESP)	Team Katusha	+ 2' 51"
8	Domenico Pozzovivo (ITA)	Ag2r–La Mondiale	+ 2' 56"
9	Giampaolo Caruso (ITA)	Team Katusha	+ 2' 58"
10	Robert Kišerlovski (CRO)	Trek Factory Racing	+ 3' 06"

=== Stage 7 ===
18 March 2014 — San Benedetto del Tronto, 9.1 km (5.7 mi) individual time trial (ITT)

Stage 7 Result

	Rider	Team	Time
1	Adriano Malori (ITA)	Movistar Team	10' 13"
2	Fabian Cancellara (SUI)	Trek Factory Racing	+ 6"
3	Bradley Wiggins (GBR)	Team Sky	+ 11"
4	Tony Martin (GER)	Omega Pharma–Quick-Step	+ 15"
5	Tom Dumoulin (NED)	Giant–Shimano	+ 19"
6	Alex Dowsett (GBR)	Movistar Team	+ 20"
7	Michał Kwiatkowski (POL)	Omega Pharma–Quick-Step	+ 22"
8	Manuel Quinziato (ITA)	BMC Racing Team	+ 23"
9	Stijn Devolder (BEL)	Trek Factory Racing	+ 24"
10	Luke Durbridge (AUS)	Orica–GreenEDGE	+ 26"

Final General Classification

	Rider	Team	Time
1	Alberto Contador (ESP)	Tinkoff–Saxo	25h 28' 45"
2	Nairo Quintana (COL)	Movistar Team	+ 2' 05"
3	Roman Kreuziger (CZE)	Tinkoff–Saxo	+ 2' 14"
4	Jean-Christophe Péraud (FRA)	Ag2r–La Mondiale	+ 2' 39"
5	Julián Arredondo (COL)	Trek Factory Racing	+ 2' 54"
6	Domenico Pozzovivo (ITA)	Ag2r–La Mondiale	+ 3' 04"
7	Robert Kišerlovski (CRO)	Trek Factory Racing	+ 3' 09"
8	Daniel Moreno (ESP)	Team Katusha	+ 3' 16"
9	Michele Scarponi (ITA)	Lampre–Merida	+ 3' 16"
10	Mikel Nieve (ESP)	Team Sky	+ 3' 19"

== Classification leadership table ==
Stage	Winner	General classification	Points classification	Mountains classification	Young rider classification	Teams classification
1	Omega Pharma–Quick-Step	Mark Cavendish	not awarded	not awarded	Michał Kwiatkowski	Omega Pharma–Quick-Step
2	Matteo Pelucchi	Mark Cavendish	Matteo Pelucchi	Marco Canola	Michał Kwiatkowski	Omega Pharma–Quick-Step
3	Peter Sagan	Michał Kwiatkowski	Peter Sagan	Marco Canola	Michał Kwiatkowski	Omega Pharma–Quick-Step
4	Alberto Contador	Michał Kwiatkowski	Peter Sagan	Marco Canola	Michał Kwiatkowski	Ag2r–La Mondiale
5	Alberto Contador	Alberto Contador	Alberto Contador	Marco Canola	Nairo Quintana	Ag2r–La Mondiale
6	Mark Cavendish	Alberto Contador	Peter Sagan	Marco Canola	Nairo Quintana	Ag2r–La Mondiale
7	Adriano Malori	Alberto Contador	Peter Sagan	Marco Canola	Nairo Quintana	Ag2r–La Mondiale
Final		Alberto Contador	Peter Sagan	Marco Canola	Nairo Quintana	Ag2r–La Mondiale
