= 2014 Tour de Romandie =

2014 UCI World Tour, race 14 of 28

Race details
- Dates: 29 April–4 May 2014
- Stages: 5 + Prologue
- Distance: 633.37 km (393.56 mi)
- Winning time: 16h 18' 46"

Results
Jersey awarded to the overall winner	Winner	Chris Froome (Great Britain)	(Team Sky)
	Second	Simon Špilak (Slovenia)	(Team Katusha)
	Third	Rui Costa (Portugal)	(Lampre–Merida)
Jersey awarded to the mountains classification winner	Mountains	Johann Tschopp (Switzerland)	(IAM Cycling)
Jersey awarded to the young rider classification winner	Young rider	Jesús Herrada (Spain)	(Movistar Team)
Jersey awarded to the sprints classification winner	Sprints	Martin Kohler (Switzerland)	(BMC Racing Team)
	Team	Movistar Team	

The 2014 Tour de Romandie was the 68th running of the Tour de Romandie cycling stage race. The race consisted of six stages, beginning with a prologue stage in Ascona on 29 April and concluding with another individual time trial, in Neuchâtel, on 4 May. It was the fourteenth race of the 2014 UCI World Tour season.

In exactly the same podium positions as the 2013 edition, Great Britain's Chris Froome of Team Sky won the race for a second successive year, after winning the final time trial stage in Neuchâtel. Having trailed Team Katusha rider Simon Špilak by a single second going into the stage, Froome turned the deficit into a 28-second race-winning margin over the 18.5 km (11.5 mi) stage. Špilak finished second, having won the race's third stage – the queen stage into Aigle – by beating Froome in a two-up sprint, after the pair had attacked towards the end of the stage. The podium was completed again by Rui Costa, now riding for Lampre–Merida, who finished third for the third year in a row. Costa finished 64 seconds behind Špilak, and one minute 32 seconds behind Froome.

In the race's other classifications, the Movistar Team's Jesús Herrada was the winner of the white jersey for the young rider classification as he was the highest placed rider born in 1989 or later, finishing in ninth place overall, 16 seconds ahead of nearest rival, FDJ.fr's Thibaut Pinot. Martin Kohler of the BMC Racing Team won the green jersey for the most points gained in intermediate sprints, while the pink jersey for the King of the Mountains classification went to Johann Tschopp of IAM Cycling. The teams classification was won by the Movistar Team, after the squad placed three riders – Beñat Intxausti (sixth), Jon Izagirre (eighth) and Herrada – inside the top ten overall.

== Teams ==
As the Tour de Romandie was a UCI World Tour event, all 18 UCI ProTeams were invited automatically and obligated to send a squad. Only IAM Cycling were awarded a wildcard place into the race, thus completing the 19-team peloton. Pre-race favourites were Chris Froome, Tejay van Garderen, Michał Kwiatkowski, Simon Špilak, Vincenzo Nibali and Rui Costa.

The 19 teams that competed in the race were:

- Ag2r–La Mondiale
- Astana
- Belkin Pro Cycling
- BMC Racing Team
- Cannondale
- Team Europcar
- FDJ.fr
- Garmin–Sharp
- Giant–Shimano
- IAM Cycling
- Team Katusha
- Lampre–Merida
- Lotto–Belisol
- Movistar Team
- Omega Pharma–Quick-Step
- Orica–GreenEDGE
- Team Sky
- Tinkoff–Saxo
- Trek Factory Racing

== Schedule ==
List of stages
Stage	Date	Course	Distance	Type	Winner
P	29 April	Ascona to Ascona	5.57 km (3 mi)	Individual time trial	Michał Kwiatkowski (POL)
1	30 April	Brigerbad to Sion	88.6 km (55 mi)	Mountain stage	Michael Albasini (SUI)
2	1 May	Sion to Montreux	166.5 km (103 mi)	Intermediate stage	Michael Albasini (SUI)
3	2 May	Le Bouveret to Aigle	180.2 km (112 mi)	Mountain stage	Simon Špilak (SLO)
4	3 May	Fribourg to Fribourg	174 km (108 mi)	Flat stage	Michael Albasini (SUI)
5	4 May	Neuchâtel to Neuchâtel	18.5 km (11 mi)	Individual time trial	Chris Froome (GBR)

== Stages ==
=== Prologue ===
29 April 2014 — Ascona, 5.57 kilometres (3.46 mi), individual time trial (ITT)

Prologue results
Rank	Rider	Team	Time
1	Michał Kwiatkowski (POL)	Omega Pharma–Quick-Step	6' 22"
2	Rohan Dennis (AUS)	Garmin–Sharp	+ 4"
3	Marcel Kittel (GER)	Garmin–Sharp	+ 4"
4	Giacomo Nizzolo (ITA)	Trek Factory Racing	+ 4"
5	Tony Martin (GER)	Omega Pharma–Quick-Step	+ 5"
6	Brett Lancaster (AUS)	Orica–GreenEDGE	+ 6"
7	Matthias Brändle (AUT)	IAM Cycling	+ 7"
8	Jesse Sergent (NZL)	Trek Factory Racing	+ 8"
9	Ramūnas Navardauskas (LTU)	Garmin–Sharp	+ 9"
10	Martijn Keizer (NED)	Belkin Pro Cycling	+ 9"

General classification after prologue
Rank	Rider	Team	Time
1	Michał Kwiatkowski (POL)	Omega Pharma–Quick-Step	6' 22"
2	Rohan Dennis (AUS)	Garmin–Sharp	+ 4"
3	Marcel Kittel (GER)	Garmin–Sharp	+ 4"
4	Giacomo Nizzolo (ITA)	Trek Factory Racing	+ 4"
5	Tony Martin (GER)	Omega Pharma–Quick-Step	+ 5"
6	Brett Lancaster (AUS)	Orica–GreenEDGE	+ 6"
7	Matthias Brändle (AUT)	IAM Cycling	+ 7"
8	Jesse Sergent (NZL)	Trek Factory Racing	+ 8"
9	Ramūnas Navardauskas (LTU)	Garmin–Sharp	+ 9"
10	Martijn Keizer (NED)	Belkin Pro Cycling	+ 9"

=== Stage 1 ===
30 April 2014 — Brigerbad to Sion, 88.6 kilometres (55.1 mi)

The stage was originally scheduled to be held over 203 km (126.1 mi), but was significantly shortened due to snow.

Stage 1 results
Rank	Rider	Team	Time
1	Michael Albasini (SWI)	Orica–GreenEDGE	2h 11' 11"
2	Jesús Herrada (SPA)	Movistar Team	+ 0"
3	Ramūnas Navardauskas (LTU)	Garmin–Sharp	+ 0"
4	Maxim Iglinskiy (KAZ)	Astana	+ 0"
5	Andrew Talansky (USA)	Garmin–Sharp	+ 0"
6	Matthias Brändle (AUT)	IAM Cycling	+ 0"
7	Rui Costa (POR)	Lampre–Merida	+ 0"
8	Jonathan Hivert (FRA)	Belkin Pro Cycling	+ 0"
9	Björn Thurau (GER)	Team Europcar	+ 0"
10	Thomas Voeckler (FRA)	Team Europcar	+ 0"

General classification after stage 1
Rank	Rider	Team	Time
1	Michał Kwiatkowski (POL)	Omega Pharma–Quick-Step	2h 17' 33"
2	Michael Albasini (SWI)	Orica–GreenEDGE	+ 5"
3	Ramūnas Navardauskas (LTU)	Garmin–Sharp	+ 5"
4	Jesús Herrada (SPA)	Movistar Team	+ 6"
5	Matthias Brändle (AUT)	IAM Cycling	+ 7"
6	Rohan Dennis (AUS)	Garmin–Sharp	+ 8"
7	Tony Martin (GER)	Omega Pharma–Quick-Step	+ 9"
8	Martijn Keizer (NED)	Belkin Pro Cycling	+ 13"
9	Alexandre Geniez (FRA)	FDJ.fr	+ 13"
10	Chris Froome (GBR)	Team Sky	+ 14"

=== Stage 2 ===
1 May 2014 — Sion to Montreux, 166.5 kilometres (103.5 mi)

Stage 2 results
Rank	Rider	Team	Time
1	Michael Albasini (SWI)	Orica–GreenEDGE	4h 12' 22"
2	Tony Hurel (FRA)	Team Europcar	+ 0"
3	Giacomo Nizzolo (ITA)	Trek Factory Racing	+ 0"
4	Alexey Tsatevich	Team Katusha	+ 0"
5	Michał Kwiatkowski (POL)	Omega Pharma–Quick-Step	+ 0"
6	Maxim Iglinskiy (KAZ)	Astana	+ 0"
7	Tosh Van Der Sande (BEL)	Lotto–Belisol	+ 0"
8	Ramūnas Navardauskas (LTU)	Garmin–Sharp	+ 0"
9	Danilo Wyss (SWI)	BMC Racing Team	+ 0"
10	Chris Froome (GBR)	Team Sky	+ 0"

General classification after stage 2
Rank	Rider	Team	Time
1	Michael Albasini (SWI)	Orica–GreenEDGE	6h 29' 50"
2	Michał Kwiatkowski (POL)	Omega Pharma–Quick-Step	+ 5"
3	Ramūnas Navardauskas (LTU)	Garmin–Sharp	+ 10"
4	Jesús Herrada (SPA)	Movistar Team	+ 11"
5	Matthias Brändle (AUT)	IAM Cycling	+ 12"
6	Rohan Dennis (AUS)	Garmin–Sharp	+ 13"
7	Tony Martin (GER)	Omega Pharma–Quick-Step	+ 14"
8	Martijn Keizer (NED)	Belkin Pro Cycling	+ 18"
9	Chris Froome (GBR)	Team Sky	+ 19"
10	Ion Izagirre (SPA)	Movistar Team	+ 19"

=== Stage 3 ===
2 May 2014 — Le Bouveret to Aigle, 180.2 kilometres (112.0 mi)

Stage 3 results
Rank	Rider	Team	Time
1	Simon Špilak (SLO)	Team Katusha	5h 09' 23"
2	Chris Froome (GBR)	Team Sky	+ 0"
3	Rui Costa (POR)	Lampre–Merida	+ 57"
4	Jakob Fuglsang (DEN)	Astana	+ 57"
5	Beñat Intxausti (SPA)	Movistar Team	+ 57"
6	Mathias Frank (SWI)	IAM Cycling	+ 57"
7	Vincenzo Nibali (ITA)	Astana	+ 57"
8	Jesús Herrada (SPA)	Movistar Team	+ 1' 41"
9	Thibaut Pinot (FRA)	FDJ.fr	+ 1' 41"
10	Andrew Talansky (USA)	Garmin–Sharp	+ 1' 41"

General classification after stage 3
Rank	Rider	Team	Time
1	Simon Špilak (SLO)	Team Katusha	11h 39' 25"
2	Chris Froome (GBR)	Team Sky	+ 1"
3	Rui Costa (POR)	Lampre–Merida	+ 1' 02"
4	Vincenzo Nibali (ITA)	Astana	+ 1' 06"
5	Mathias Frank (SWI)	IAM Cycling	+ 1' 10"
6	Beñat Intxausti (SPA)	Movistar Team	+ 1' 13"
7	Jakob Fuglsang (DEN)	Astana	+ 1' 14"
8	Jesús Herrada (SPA)	Movistar Team	+ 1' 40"
9	Ion Izagirre (SPA)	Movistar Team	+ 1' 48"
10	Andrew Talansky (USA)	Garmin–Sharp	+ 1' 50"

=== Stage 4 ===
3 May 2014 — Fribourg to Fribourg, 174 kilometres (108 mi)

Stage 4 results
Rank	Rider	Team	Time
1	Michael Albasini (SWI)	Orica–GreenEDGE	4h 14' 21"
2	Thomas Voeckler (FRA)	Team Europcar	+ 0"
3	Jan Bakelants (BEL)	Omega Pharma–Quick-Step	+ 0"
4	Davide Appollonio (ITA)	Ag2r–La Mondiale	+ 9"
5	Anthony Roux (FRA)	FDJ.fr	+ 9"
6	Oscar Gatto (ITA)	Cannondale	+ 9"
7	Ramūnas Navardauskas (LTU)	Garmin–Sharp	+ 9"
8	Luka Mezgec (CRO)	Giant–Shimano	+ 9"
9	Roberto Ferrari (ITA)	Lampre–Merida	+ 9"
10	Tony Hurel (FRA)	Team Europcar	+ 9"

General classification after stage 4
Rank	Rider	Team	Time
1	Simon Špilak (SLO)	Team Katusha	15h 53' 55"
2	Chris Froome (GBR)	Team Sky	+ 1"
3	Rui Costa (POR)	Lampre–Merida	+ 1' 02"
4	Vincenzo Nibali (ITA)	Astana	+ 1' 06"
5	Mathias Frank (SWI)	IAM Cycling	+ 1' 10"
6	Beñat Intxausti (SPA)	Movistar Team	+ 1' 13"
7	Jakob Fuglsang (DEN)	Astana	+ 1' 14"
8	Jesús Herrada (SPA)	Movistar Team	+ 1' 40"
9	Ion Izagirre (SPA)	Movistar Team	+ 1' 48"
10	Andrew Talansky (USA)	Garmin–Sharp	+ 1' 50"

=== Stage 5 ===
4 May 2014 — Neuchâtel, 18.5 kilometres (11.5 mi), individual time trial (ITT)

Stage 5 results
Rank	Rider	Team	Time
1	Chris Froome (GBR)	Team Sky	24' 50"
2	Tony Martin (GER)	Omega Pharma–Quick-Step	+ 1"
3	Jesse Sergent (NZL)	Trek Factory Racing	+ 8"
4	Rigoberto Urán (COL)	Omega Pharma–Quick-Step	+ 15"
5	Ion Izagirre (SPA)	Movistar Team	+ 20"
6	Riccardo Zoidl (SWI)	Trek Factory Racing	+ 29"
7	Simon Špilak (SLO)	Team Katusha	+ 29"
8	Rui Costa (POR)	Lampre–Merida	+ 31"
9	Thibaut Pinot (FRA)	FDJ.fr	+ 35"
10	Mathias Frank (SWI)	IAM Cycling	+ 35"

General classification after stage 5
Rank	Rider	Team	Time
1	Chris Froome (GBR)	Team Sky	16h 18' 46"
2	Simon Špilak (SLO)	Team Katusha	+ 28"
3	Rui Costa (POR)	Lampre–Merida	+ 1' 32"
4	Mathias Frank (SWI)	IAM Cycling	+ 1' 44"
5	Vincenzo Nibali (ITA)	Astana	+ 1' 48"
6	Beñat Intxausti (SPA)	Movistar Team	+ 1' 52"
7	Jakob Fuglsang (DEN)	Astana	+ 1' 56"
8	Ion Izagirre (SPA)	Movistar Team	+ 2' 07"
9	Jesús Herrada (SPA)	Movistar Team	+ 2' 15"
10	Thibaut Pinot (FRA)	FDJ.fr	+ 2' 31"

== Classification leadership table ==
In the 2014 Tour de Romandie, four different jerseys were awarded. For the general classification, calculated by adding each cyclist's finishing times on each stage, and allowing time bonuses in mass-start stages – on a basis of ten seconds to the stage winner, six seconds for second place and four seconds for third place – the leader received a yellow jersey. This classification was considered the most important of the 2014 Tour de Romandie, and the winner of the classification was considered the winner of the race.

Additionally, there was a young rider classification, which awarded a white jersey. This was decided in the same way as the general classification, but only riders born after 1 January 1989 were eligible to be ranked in the classification. There was also a mountains classification, the leadership of which was marked by a pink jersey. In the mountains classification, points were won by reaching the top of a climb before other cyclists, with more points available for the higher-categorised climbs; there were fourteen categorised climbs in the race, split into three distinctive categories.

The fourth jersey represented the sprints classification, marked by a green jersey. In the sprints classification, cyclists received points for finishing in the top 3 at intermediate sprint points during each stage, with the exception of the individual time trial stages. There was also a classification for teams, in which the times of the best three cyclists per team on each stage were added together; the leading team at the end of the race was the team with the lowest total time.

Stage	Winner	General classification	Mountains classification	Sprints classification	Young rider classification	Team classification
P	Michał Kwiatkowski	Michał Kwiatkowski	not awarded (Note: Although Michał Kwiatkowski received the jersey on the podium in Ascona, no points were on offer during the stage.)	not awarded	Michał Kwiatkowski	Omega Pharma–Quick-Step
1	Michael Albasini	Michał Kwiatkowski	Johann Tschopp	Vincenzo Nibali	Michał Kwiatkowski	Omega Pharma–Quick-Step
2	Michael Albasini	Michael Albasini	Johann Tschopp	Martin Kohler	Michał Kwiatkowski	Omega Pharma–Quick-Step
3	Simon Špilak	Simon Špilak	Johann Tschopp	Martin Kohler	Jesús Herrada	Movistar Team
4	Michael Albasini	Simon Špilak	Johann Tschopp	Martin Kohler	Jesús Herrada	Movistar Team
5	Chris Froome	Chris Froome	Johann Tschopp	Martin Kohler	Jesús Herrada	Movistar Team
Final		Chris Froome	Johann Tschopp	Martin Kohler	Jesús Herrada	Movistar Team

== Classification standings ==
=== General classification ===
Final general classification (1–10)
Rank	Rider	Team	Time
1	Chris Froome (GBR)	Team Sky	16h 18' 46"
2	Simon Špilak (SLO)	Team Katusha	+ 28"
3	Rui Costa (POR)	Lampre–Merida	+ 1' 32"
4	Mathias Frank (SWI)	IAM Cycling	+ 1' 44"
5	Vincenzo Nibali (ITA)	Astana	+ 1' 48"
6	Beñat Intxausti (SPA)	Movistar Team	+ 1' 52"
7	Jakob Fuglsang (DEN)	Astana	+ 1' 56"
8	Ion Izagirre (SPA)	Movistar Team	+ 2' 07"
9	Jesús Herrada (SPA)	Movistar Team	+ 2' 15"
10	Thibaut Pinot (FRA)	FDJ.fr	+ 2' 31"

=== Mountains classification ===
Final mountains classification (1–10)
Rank	Rider	Team	Points
1	Johann Tschopp (SWI)	IAM Cycling	30
2	Cyril Gautier (FRA)	Team Europcar	28
3	Chris Froome (GBR)	Team Sky	12
4	Jean-Marc Marino (FRA)	Cannondale	12
5	Pirmin Lang (SWI)	IAM Cycling	10
6	Simon Špilak (SLO)	Team Katusha	8
7	Alexis Vuillermoz (FRA)	Ag2r–La Mondiale	6
8	Vincenzo Nibali (ITA)	Astana	6
9	Thibaut Pinot (FRA)	FDJ.fr	6
10	Rohan Dennis (AUS)	Garmin–Sharp	6

=== Young rider classification ===
Final young rider classification (1–10)
Rank	Rider	Team	Time
9	Jesús Herrada (SPA)	Movistar Team	16h 21' 01"
10	Thibaut Pinot (FRA)	FDJ.fr	+ 16"
9	Edward Beltrán (COL)	Tinkoff–Saxo	+ 10' 50"
9	Georg Preidler (AUT)	Giant–Shimano	+ 11' 55"
9	Sergei Chernetski	Team Katusha	+ 13' 59"
9	Rohan Dennis (AUS)	Garmin–Sharp	+ 15' 49"
9	Silvan Dillier (SWI)	BMC Racing Team	+ 20' 48"
9	Paweł Poljański (POL)	Tinkoff–Saxo	+ 23' 41"
9	Moreno Moser (ITA)	Cannondale	+ 23' 53"
9	Kenny Elissonde (FRA)	FDJ.fr	+ 26' 57"

=== Team classification ===
Final team classification (1–10)
Rank	Team	Time
1	(Spain) Movistar Team	49h 02' 34"
2	(Switzerland) IAM Cycling	+ 2' 48"
3	(Kazakhstan) Astana	+ 7' 13"
4	Team Katusha	+ 11' 42"
5	Tinkoff–Saxo	+ 15' 34"
6	(United States) Garmin–Sharp	+ 18' 29"
7	(Belgium) Omega Pharma–Quick-Step	+ 18' 48"
8	(Italy) Lampre–Merida	+ 28' 52"
9	(United Kingdom) Team Sky	+ 30' 17"
10	(United States) BMC Racing Team	+ 30' 25"
