= Mathias Frank =

Swiss road bicycle racer

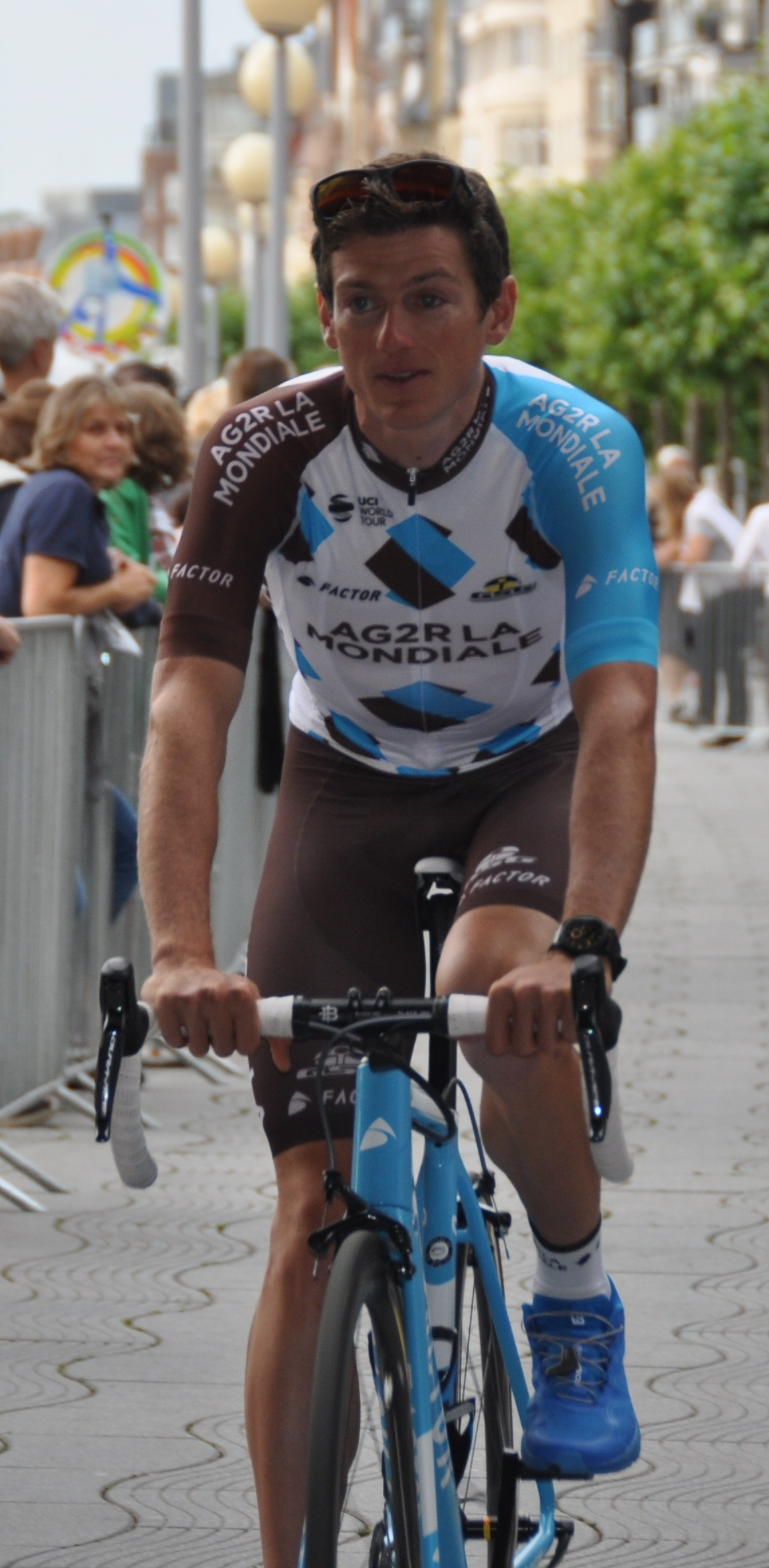
- Frank at the 2017 Tour de France

Personal information
- Full name: Mathias Frank
- Born: 9 December 1986 (age 39) Roggliswil, Switzerland
- Height: 1.76 m (5 ft 9 1/2 in)
- Weight: 64 kg (141 lb; 10 st 1 lb)

Cycling career
- Sport: Cycling
- Current team: Retired
- Discipline: Road
- Role: Rider
- Rider type: All-rounder

Amateur team
- Team Hörmann

Professional teams
- 2008: Gerolsteiner
- 2009–2013: BMC Racing Team
- 2014–2016: IAM Cycling
- 2017–2021: AG2R La Mondiale

Major wins
- Grand Tours Vuelta a España 1 individual stage (2016)

Mathias Frank (born 9 December 1986) is a Swiss former road bicycle racer, who rode professionally between 2008 and 2021 for the Gerolsteiner, BMC Racing Team, IAM Cycling and AG2R Citroën Team teams. A strong climber, Frank finished 8th overall in the 2015 Tour de France, and won a breakaway stage in the 2016 Vuelta a España.

== Professional career ==
=== 2008–2013 ===
Mathias Frank started his professional cycling career with German outfit Gerolsteiner. He won his first ever professional win at the GP Triberg-Schwarzwald. However the German team folded after the season which meant Frank had to look elsewhere to continue his cycling career. It ended with a switch to BMC Racing Team. He raced for the BMC Team for 5 years, and won 3 races with BMC, and great results at the Tour de Suisse.

=== IAM Cycling (2014–2016) ===
In 2013 a new Swiss professional continental cycling team was created, and Frank moved to IAM Cycling for the 2014 season. He raced with the team for 3 years until it closed at the end of 2016. Frank finished 2nd overall at Tour de Suisse and 4th overall at Tour de Romandie in 2014. The following year 2015, Frank focused on racing the Tour de France general classification. He entered the breakaway on Stage 17 and finished 5th on that stage, advancing to 8th in the general classification. On Stage 19, Frank even advanced one place further in the general classification to 7th, however on Stage 20 to Alpe d'Huez, he dropped to 8th again, which he also ended up finishing in Paris. The following year 2016, Frank had bad luck in the Tour de France when he crashed out on Stage 14. This switched his focus to the Vuelta a Espana. He managed to get into several breakaways before finally winning a Stage on Stage 17.

=== AG2R La Mondiale (2017–2021) ===
Frank signed an initial two-year contract with French squad AG2R La Mondiale, and moved his focus to supporting Romain Bardet in the Tour de France. Frank finished 7th overall in Tour de Suisse, as his preparation for the Tour de France. Frank helped Bardet reaching the podium in Paris. The following year Frank was left out of the Tour de France squad, however when Alexandre Geniez was lacking form, Frank was ready to step in and helped Bardet to 6th place in Paris.

== Major results ==
2006
1st Stage 4 Tour des Aéroports
2nd Road race, National Under-23 Road Championships
2007
1st Overall Thüringen Rundfahrt der U23

1st Stage 5

1st Stage 4 Grand Prix Guillaume Tell
2008 (1 pro win)
1st GP Triberg-Schwarzwald
9th Overall Tour de l'Ain
2009
1st Overall Grand Prix Guillaume Tell
6th Overall Tour of Ireland
8th Overall Tour de Wallonie
2010
Tour de Suisse

1st Mountains classification
1st Sprints classification

2011
6th Overall Tour de Suisse
2012
1st Swiss rider classification, Tour de Suisse
10th Overall Giro del Trentino

1st Stage 1 (TTT)

10th Overall Tour of Utah
2013 (3)
Tour of Austria

1st Stages 4 & 5

2nd Overall USA Pro Cycling Challenge

1st Stage 2

3rd Grand Prix de Wallonie
4th Overall Tour of California
5th Overall Tour de Suisse
2014 (2)
2nd Overall Critérium International

1st Points classification
1st Mountains classification
1st Stage 3

2nd Overall Bayern Rundfahrt

1st Stage 2

2nd Overall Tour de Suisse

1st Swiss rider classification

4th Overall Tour de Romandie
7th Overall Circuit de la Sarthe
2015
3rd Road race, National Road Championships
5th Overall Arctic Race of Norway
8th Overall Tour de France
2016 (1)
1st Stage 17 Vuelta a España
7th Overall Circuit de la Sarthe
8th Overall Tour de Romandie
2017
7th Overall Tour de Suisse

1st Swiss rider classification

7th Boucles de l'Aulne
2018
4th Road race, National Road Championships
5th Tre Valli Varesine
9th Giro della Toscana
10th Overall Tour of California
2019
2nd Overall Tour de l'Ain
3rd Road race, National Road Championships
6th Gran Piemonte
2021
5th Mercan'Tour Classic

=== General classification results timeline ===
Grand Tour general classification results
Grand Tour	2008	2009	2010	2011	2012	2013	2014	2015	2016	2017	2018	2019	2020	2021
Giro d'Italia	—	—	—	DNF	83	—	—	—	—	—	—	—	—	—
Tour de France	—	—	DNF	—	—	—	DNF	8	DNF	30	55	48	—	—
/ Vuelta a España	DNF	—	—	94	—	—	—	—	37	—	—	—	DNF	—
Major stage race general classification results
Race	2008	2009	2010	2011	2012	2013	2014	2015	2016	2017	2018	2019	2020	2021
Paris–Nice	—	—	—	—	—	33	61	34	—	22	—	DNF	—	—
Tirreno–Adriatico	—	—	66	—	—	—	—	—	50	—	36	—	52	—
Volta a Catalunya	119	—	—	63	22	—	—	—	28	—	14	—	NH	—
Tour of the Basque Country	—	—	—	83	—	—	—	—	—	—	—	67	NH	DNF
Tour de Romandie	86	12	43	—	—	DNF	4	12	8	33	23	12	NH	68
Critérium du Dauphiné	—	30	—	—	—	—	—	DNF	—	—	—	—	—	—
Tour de Suisse	36	—	67	6	12	5	2	—	DNF	7	17	20	NH	94

Legend
—	Did not compete
DNF	Did not finish
