= Johann Tschopp =

Swiss mountain biker

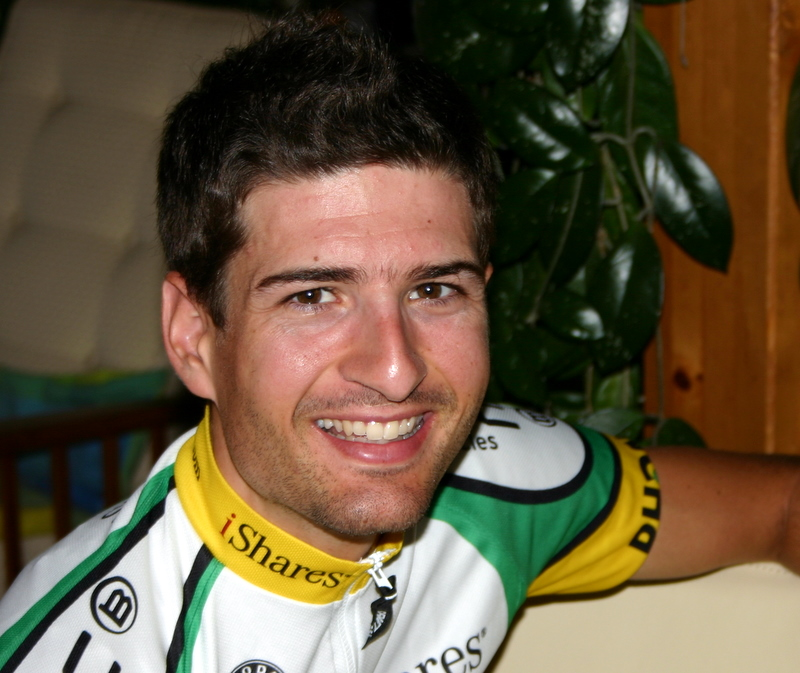
- Tschopp at the 2006 Deutschland Tour.

Personal information
- Full name: Johann Tschopp
- Born: 1 July 1982 (age 44) Sierre, Switzerland
- Height: 1.75 m (5 ft 9 in)
- Weight: 62 kg (137 lb)

Cycling career
- Sport: Cycling
- Disciplines: Road; Cyclo-cross; MTB
- Role: Rider
- Rider type: Climbing specialist

Professional teams
- 2004–2006: Phonak
- 2007–2010: Bouygues Télécom
- 2011–2012: BMC Racing Team
- 2013–2014: IAM Cycling

Major wins
- National Mountain Bike Marathon Championships (2005); Giro d'Italia 1 stage Tour of Utah (2012)

Johann Tschopp (born 1 July 1982 in Sierre) is a Swiss professional mountain bike racer. He previously competed as a professional road bicycle racer between 2004 and 2014, competing with the Phonak, Bouygues Télécom, BMC Racing Team and IAM Cycling squads. He is noted as an especially good climber since he is lightweight (1.75 m, 60 kg) and his training environment is mainly mountainous. He has already a quite important record in cyclo-cross and mountain bike marathon.

== Career ==
=== 2012 season ===
In August 2012, Tschopp won the Tour of Utah's overall classification thanks to his victorious performance on the queen stage of the race, the fifth one. He got out of the bunch on the lower slopes of the last climb leading to the Snowbird ski resort, passed all the scattered breakaway riders and crossed the uphill finish with an advantage of 43 seconds on his nearest pursuer. This ride netted him the leader's jersey previously worn by Garmin–Sharp rider Christian Vande Velde. Tschopp and his teammates managed to hold on to the general classification lead on the last trial, stage 6, which was another mountainous affair, and celebrated the victory.

=== 2013 season ===
Tschopp left BMC Racing Team at the end of the 2012 season, and joined a new team from his native country, the IAM Cycling team for the 2013 season. In the Tour of Oman, he took the sixth place in the general classification of a field that included the likes of Chris Froome, Alberto Contador and Joaquim Rodríguez, who finished ahead of him. In Paris–Nice, Tschopp won the mountains classification jersey thanks to his participation in numerous breakaways. He had a commanding lead at 64 points, 40 points more than his closest rival.

=== 2014 season ===
In November 2014 Tschopp announced that he would retire from road racing to return to mountain biking in 2015.

== Career achievements ==
=== Major results ===
2003
2nd National Mountain Biking Championships
2nd Sierre–Loye
3rd National Cyclo-Cross Championships
2005
2nd Overall Tour of Austria
2007
5th Overall Tour de l'Ain
2009
5th Overall Tropicale Amissa Bongo

1st Stage 4

5th Overall Tour de Langkawi
2010
1st Stage 20 Giro d'Italia

Cima Coppi

2012
1st Overall Tour of Utah

1st Stage 5

3rd Overall Paris–Corrèze
2013
1st Mountains classification Paris–Nice
2nd Trofeo Matteotti
6th Overall Tour of Oman
9th Overall Critérium International
9th Overall Tour of Norway
2014
1st Mountains classification Tour de Romandie
8th Overall Bayern-Rundfahrt
9th Overall Tour of Oman

=== Grand Tour general classification results timeline ===
Grand Tour	2005	2006	2007	2008	2009	2010	2011	2012	2013
Giro d'Italia	41	45	—	—	126	34	15	12	—
Tour de France	—	—	93	54	—	—	—	—	—
Vuelta a España	—	—	—	—	—	81	DNF	—	—

Legend
—	Did not compete
DNF	Did not finish
