= Matteo Pelucchi =

Italian road and track cyclist

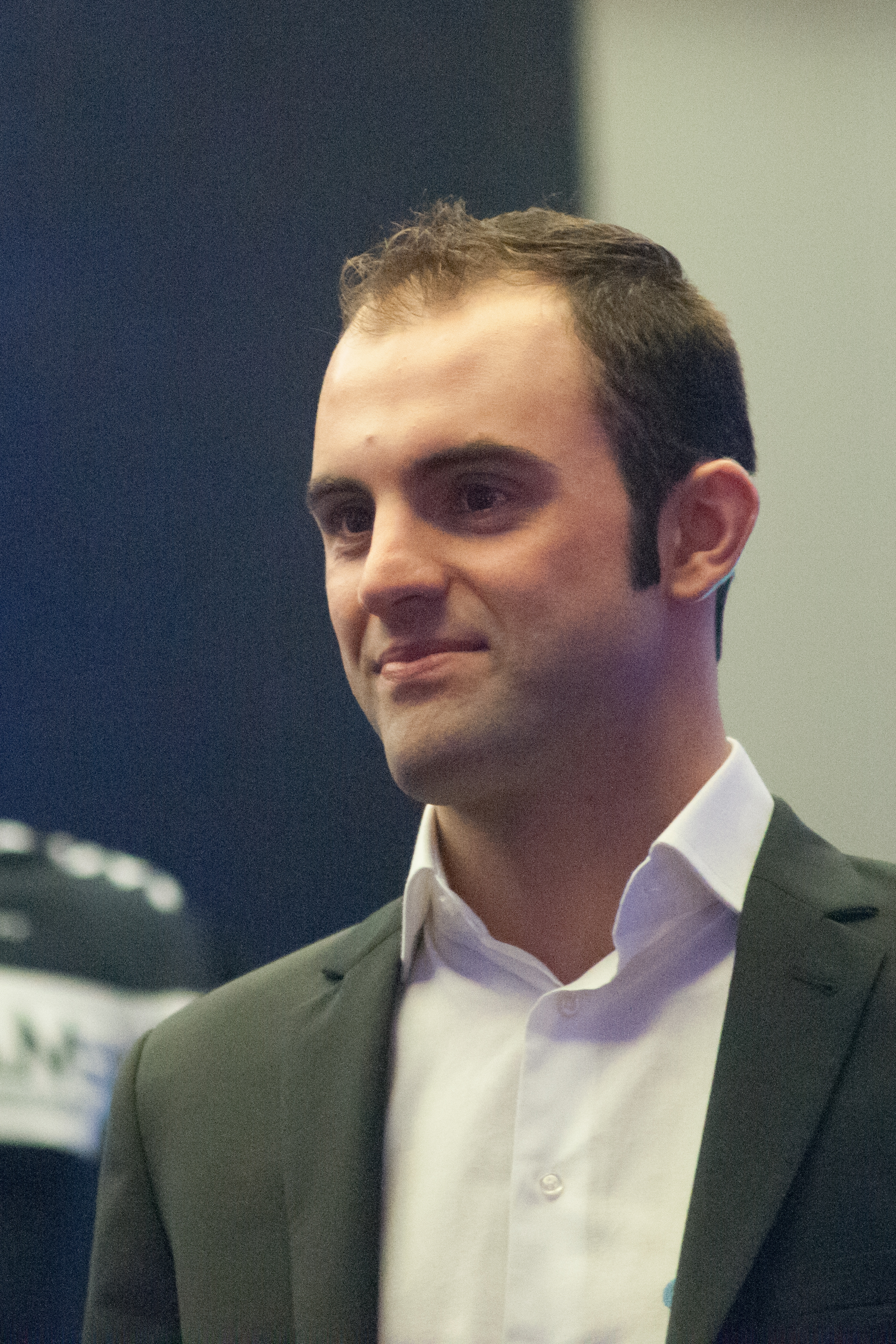

Personal information
- Full name: Matteo Pelucchi
- Born: 21 January 1989 (age 37) Giussano, Italy
- Height: 182 cm (6 ft 0 in)
- Weight: 74 kg (163 lb)

Cycling career
- Sport: Cycling
- Current team: Retired
- Disciplines: Road; Track
- Role: Rider
- Rider type: Sprinter

Professional teams
- 2011: Geox–TMC
- 2012: Team Europcar
- 2013–2016: IAM Cycling
- 2017–2018: Bora–Hansgrohe
- 2019: Androni Giocattoli–Sidermec
- 2020: Bardiani–CSF–Faizanè
- 2021: Team Qhubeka Assos

Matteo Pelucchi (born 21 January 1989) is an Italian former professional road cyclist, who competed as a professional from 2011 to 2021. He also competed in track cycling at a junior level.

== Career ==
He rode for a year with Team Europcar in 2012, and four years with IAM Cycling between 2013 and 2016. In October 2016 he and IAM teammate Aleksejs Saramotins were announced as members of the Bora–Hansgrohe squad for 2017. Pelucchi joined Androni Giocattoli–Sidermec in 2019 after two years with Bora–Hansgrohe, before joining his sixth professional team in 2020, Bardiani–CSF–Faizanè.

In December 2020, Pelucchi signed a one-year contract with Team Qhubeka Assos, for the 2021 season. He retired from competition at the end of the 2021 season.

== Major results ==
2007
National Junior Track Championships

1st Kilo
1st Keirin

2010
1st Trofeo Papà Cervi
2011
1st Clásica de Almería
2012
Ronde de l'Oise

1st Points classification
1st Stage 3

1st Stage 5 Four Days of Dunkirk
3rd Trofeo Migjorn
8th Grand Prix de Denain
10th Trofeo Palma de Mallorca
2013
Circuit de la Sarthe

1st Points classification
1st Stage 1

2nd Velothon Berlin
6th Châteauroux Classic
2014
1st Stage 2 Vuelta a Burgos
1st Stage 2 Tirreno–Adriatico
2nd Grand Prix de Denain
9th Overall World Ports Classic
10th Scheldeprijs
2015
1st Trofeo Santanyi-Ses Salines-Campos
1st Trofeo Playa de Palma
Tour de Pologne

1st Stages 2 & 3

10th Kuurne–Brussels–Kuurne
2017
2nd Trofeo Playa de Palma
4th Trofeo Porreres-Felanitx-Ses Salines-Campos
6th Münsterland Giro
2018
1st Stage 1 (TTT) Czech Cycling Tour
1st Stage 3 Okolo Slovenska
4th Handzame Classic
2019
Tour de Langkawi

1st Stages 5 & 6

Tour of Taihu Lake

1st Stages 2 & 4

1st Stage 3 Vuelta a Aragón
1st Stage 3 Tour Poitou-Charentes en Nouvelle-Aquitaine
8th Grote Prijs Marcel Kint

=== Grand Tour general classification results timeline ===
Grand Tour	2014	2015	2016	2017	2018	2019
Giro d'Italia	—	DNF	DNF	DNF	—	—
Tour de France	Has not contested during his career					
Vuelta a España	DNF	DNF	—	—	—	—

Legend
—	Did not compete
DNF	Did not finish
