= Jonathan Fumeaux =

Swiss cyclist (born 1988)

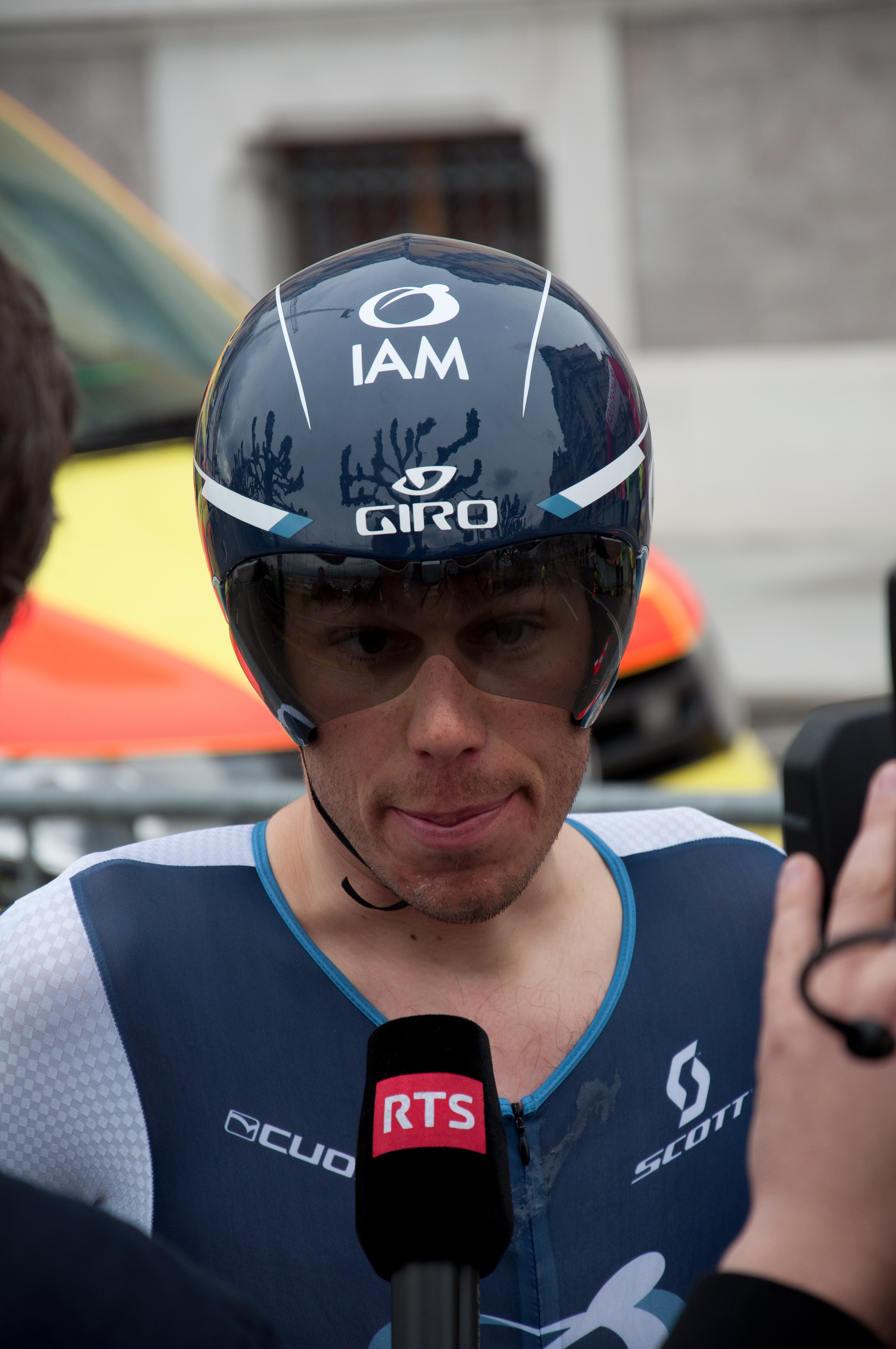
- Fumeaux in 2013

Personal information
- Born: 7 March 1988 (age 38) Sion, Switzerland
- Height: 1.78 m (5 ft 10 in)
- Weight: 61 kg (134 lb; 9.6 st)

Cycling career
- Sport: Cycling
- Current team: Retired
- Discipline: Road
- Role: Rider

Professional teams
- 2011–2012: Atlas Personal
- 2013–2016: IAM Cycling
- 2017: Roth–Akros

Major wins
- One-day races and Classics National Road Race Championships (2016)

Jonathan Fumeaux (born 7 March 1988) is a Swiss former racing cyclist. He rode in the 2014 Vuelta a España. He rode with Team Roth.

== Major results ==
2011
1st Stage 3 Grand Prix Chantal Biya
7th Overall Le Triptyque des Monts et Châteaux
9th Grand Prix de Plumelec-Morbihan
2012
1st Stage 6 Tour Alsace
1st Mountains classification Le Triptyque des Monts et Châteaux
5th Overall Tour de Bretagne
8th Overall An Post Rás
2013
8th Overall Tour de Luxembourg
8th GP du canton d'Argovie
8th Tour du Jura
2016
National Road Championships

1st Road race
4th Time trial
