= Vicente Reynés =

Spanish road bicycle racer

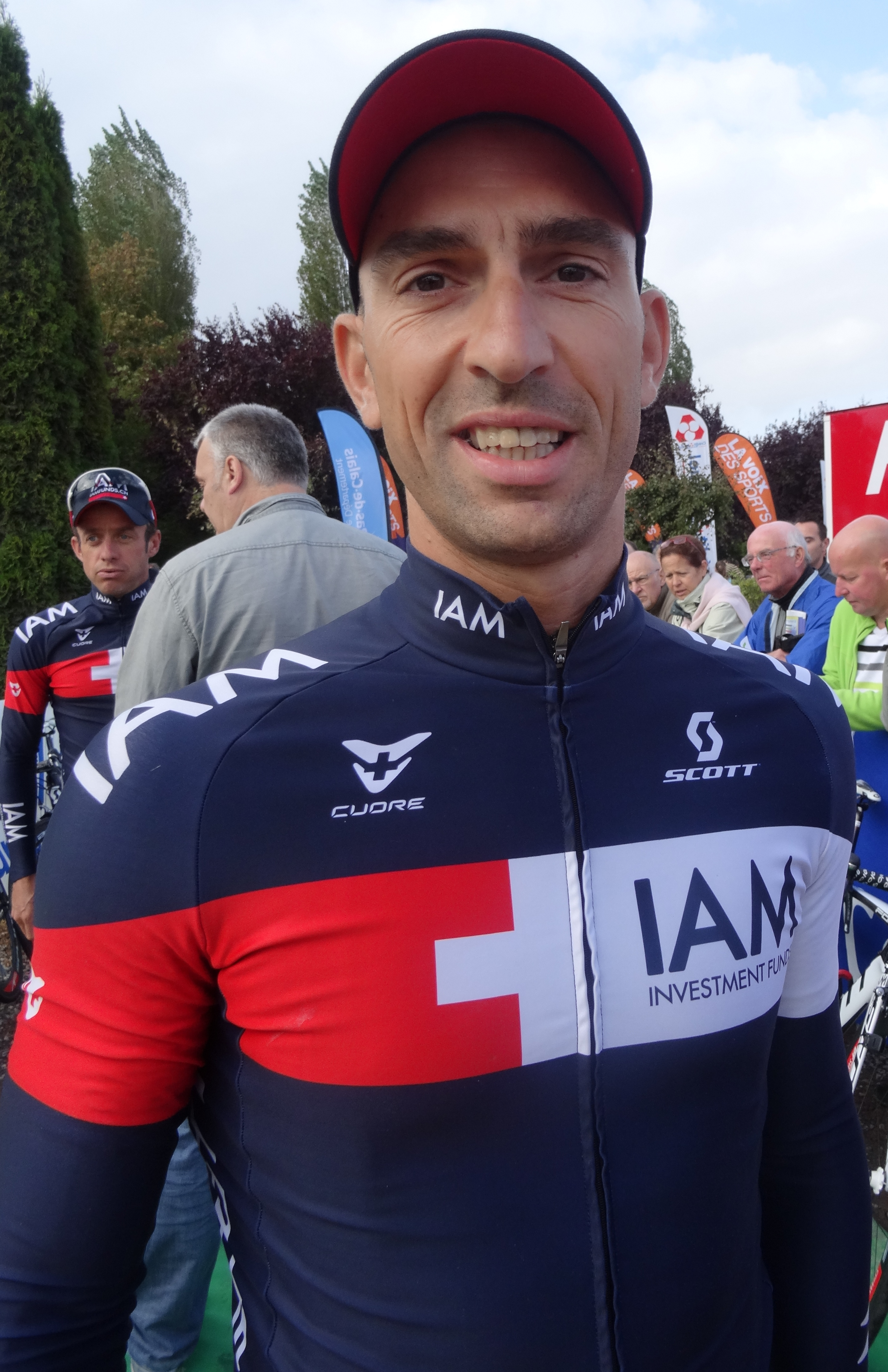
- Reynès at the 2014 Grand Prix d'Isbergues

Personal information
- Full name: Vicente Reynés Mimó
- Born: 30 July 1981 (age 45) Deià, Spain
- Height: 1.75 m (5 ft 9 in)
- Weight: 68 kg (150 lb)

Cycling career
- Sport: Cycling
- Discipline: Road
- Role: Rider
- Rider type: Sprinter

Professional teams
- 2003: LA Alumínios–Pecol–Bombarral
- 2004–2007: Illes Balears–Banesto
- 2008–2010: Team High Road
- 2011–2013: Omega Pharma–Lotto
- 2014–2016: IAM Cycling

Vicente Reynés Mimó (born 30 July 1981 in Deià) is a Spanish former professional road bicycle racer, who rode professionally between 2003 and 2016 for the LA Alumínios–Pecol–Bombarral, Caisse d'Epargne, Team HTC–Columbia, Lotto–Belisol and IAM Cycling teams.

== Major results ==
2003
4th Circuito de Getxo
Vuelta a Mallorca

8th Trofeo Mallorca
10th Trofeo Alcudia

2004
1st Stage 1 (TTT) Volta a Catalunya
5th Clásica a los Puertos de Guadarrama
9th Trofeo Mallorca
2005
1st Stage 3 Paris–Nice
3rd Trofeo Mallorca
4th Overall Vuelta a Andalucía
2006
5th Giro del Piemonte
2007
Vuelta a Mallorca

1st Trofeo Cala Millor-Cala Bona
4th Trofeo Soller
5th Trofeo Calvià
9th Trofeo Mallorca
10th Trofeo Pollença

1st Circuito de Getxo
9th Milan–San Remo
2009
10th Trofeo Mallorca
2010
10th Ronde van het Groene Hart
2014
5th Trofeo Ses Salines
8th Paris–Bourges
