= IAM Cycling =

Swiss cycling team

Team information
- UCI code: IAM
- Registered: Switzerland
- Founded: 2013
- Disbanded: 2016
- Discipline: Road
- Status: UCI Pro Continental (2013–2014); UCI WorldTeam (2015–2016)
- Bicycles: Scott Sports
- Components: Shimano
- Website: Team home page

Team name history
IAM Cycling jersey
Jersey

IAM Cycling was a Swiss registered UCI WorldTour cycling team. It was managed by former French road race champion Serge Beucherie.
The title sponsor was IAM Independent Asset Management SA, a Swiss financial company.

== History ==
=== 2013 ===
The team was officially launched in January 2013. IAM Cycling is a member of the Mouvement pour un cyclisme crédible. IAM Cycling was selected as a wild-card entry for the 2013 Paris–Nice race.

=== 2014 ===
On 22 August 2013 the team announced that it had signed Sylvain Chavanel and Jérôme Pineau from Omega Pharma–Quick-Step, Mathias Frank from BMC Racing Team and Roger Kluge from NetApp–Endura for the 2014 season. On 28 January it was announced that IAM Cycling had been granted a "wild card" entry to Tour de France 2014, its first Grand Tour. It also raced the Vuelta a España. Subsequently, in December 2014 the UCI announced that the team would be granted a WorldTour licence for the 2015 season.

=== 2016 ===
In May 2016, the team announced they would fold at the end of the season due to not being able to secure a secondary sponsor.

== Final roster (2016) ==
As of 29 March 2016

| Rider | Date of birth |
|---|---|
| Marcel Aregger (SUI) | August 26, 1990 (aged 25) |
| Matthias Brändle (AUT) | December 7, 1989 (aged 26) |
| Clément Chevrier (FRA) | June 29, 1992 (aged 23) |
| Stef Clement (NED) | September 24, 1982 (aged 33) |
| Jérôme Coppel (FRA) | August 6, 1986 (aged 29) |
| Stefan Denifl (AUT) | September 20, 1987 (aged 28) |
| Dries Devenyns (BEL) | July 22, 1983 (aged 32) |
| Martin Elmiger (SUI) | September 23, 1978 (aged 37) |
| Sondre Holst Enger (NOR) | December 17, 1993 (aged 22) |
| Mathias Frank (SUI) | December 9, 1986 (aged 29) |
| Jonathan Fumeaux (SUI) | March 7, 1988 (aged 28) |
| Heinrich Haussler (AUS) | February 25, 1984 (aged 32) |
| Reto Hollenstein (SUI) | August 22, 1985 (aged 30) |
| Leigh Howard (AUS) | October 18, 1989 (aged 26) |

| Rider | Date of birth |
|---|---|
| Roger Kluge (GER) | February 5, 1986 (aged 30) |
| Vegard Stake Laengen (NOR) | February 7, 1989 (aged 27) |
| Pirmin Lang (SUI) | November 25, 1984 (aged 31) |
| Oliver Naesen (BEL) | September 16, 1990 (aged 25) |
| Jarlinson Pantano (COL) | November 19, 1988 (aged 27) |
| Simon Pellaud (SUI) | November 6, 1992 (aged 23) |
| Matteo Pelucchi (ITA) | January 21, 1989 (aged 27) |
| Vicente Reynés (ESP) | July 30, 1981 (aged 34) |
| Aleksejs Saramotins (LAT) | April 8, 1982 (aged 33) |
| David Tanner (AUS) | September 30, 1984 (aged 31) |
| Jonas van Genechten (BEL) | September 16, 1986 (aged 29) |
| Larry Warbasse (USA) | June 28, 1990 (aged 25) |
| Marcel Wyss (SUI) | June 25, 1986 (aged 29) |
| Oliver Zaugg (SUI) | May 9, 1981 (aged 34) |

== Major wins ==
2013
Overall Tour Méditerranéen, Thomas Löfkvist
Stage 1 Circuit de la Sarthe, Matteo Pelucchi
Tour de Berne, Marcel Wyss
Austria Time Trial Championships, Matthias Brändle
Stage 5 Bayern Rundfahrt, Heinrich Haussler
Sweden Time Trial Championships, Gustav Larsson
Latvia Road Race Championships, Aleksejs Saramotins
Trofeo Matteotti, Sébastien Reichenbach
Overall Tour du Limousin, Martin Elmiger

Stage 1, Martin Elmiger

Tour du Jura, Matthias Brändle
Tour du Doubs, Aleksejs Saramotins

2014
Stage 2 Tirreno–Adriatico, Matteo Pelucchi
Stage 3 Critérium International, Mathias Frank
Stage 3 Four Days of Dunkirk, Sylvain Chavanel
Tour de Berne, Matthias Brändle
Stage 1 Bayern Rundfahrt, Heinrich Haussler
Stage 2 Bayern Rundfahrt, Mathias Frank
France Time Trial Championships, Sylvain Chavanel
Austria Time Trial Championships, Matthias Brändle
Switzerland Road Race Championships, Martin Elmiger
Stage 2 Vuelta a Burgos, Matteo Pelucchi
Stage 5 (ITT) Vuelta a Burgos, Aleksejs Saramotins
Overall Tour du Poitou-Charentes, Sylvain Chavanel

Stage 4 (ITT), Sylvain Chavanel

GP Ouest–France, Sylvain Chavanel
Stages 5 & 6 Tour of Britain, Matthias Brändle
Chrono des Nation, Sylvain Chavanel

2015
Australia Road Race Championships, Heinrich Haussler
Trofeo Santanyi-Ses Salines-Campos, Matteo Pelucchi
Trofeo Playa de Palma-Palma, Matteo Pelucchi
Stage 6 Tour of Oman, Matthias Brändle
Prologue Tour of Belgium, Matthias Brändle
Prologue Ster ZLM Toer, Roger Kluge
France Time Trial Championships, Jérôme Coppel
Latvia Road Race Championships, Aleksejs Saramotins
Stage 1 Tour of Austria, Sondre Holst Enger
Stage 2 Tour of Austria, David Tanner
Stage 4 Tour de Wallonie, Jonas van Genechten
Stages 2 & 3 Tour de Pologne, Matteo Pelucchi

2016
Grand Prix d'Ouverture La Marseillaise, Dries Devenyns
Clásica de Almería, Leigh Howard
Overall Étoile de Bessèges, Jérôme Coppel

Stage 5 (ITT), Jérôme Coppel

Stage 6 Tour of Croatia, Sondre Holst Enger
Stage 17 Giro d'Italia, Roger Kluge
Overall Tour of Belgium, Dries Devenyns

Stage 2, Dries Devenyns

Stage 9 Tour de Suisse, Jarlinson Pantano
Austria Road Race Championships, Matthias Brändle
Austria Time Trial Championships, Matthias Brändle
Switzerland Road Race Championships, Jonathan Fumeaux
Stage 15 Tour de France, Jarlinson Pantano
Overall Tour de Wallonie, Dries Devenyns

Stage 5, Dries Devenyns

Stage 7 Vuelta a España, Jonas van Genechten
Bretagne Classic Ouest–France, Oliver Naesen
Stage 16 Vuelta a España, Mathias Frank

=== Supplementary statistics ===
Grand Tours by highest finishing position
| Race | 2013 | 2014 | 2015 | 2016 |
| Giro d'Italia | — | — | 36 | 40 |
| Tour de France | — | 32 | 8 | 18 |
| Vuelta a España | — | 61 | 38 | 21 |
Major week-long stage races by highest finishing position
| Race | 2013 | 2014 | 2015 | 2016 |
| Tour Down Under | — | — | — | 30 |
| Paris–Nice | 29 | 7 | 11 | 40 |
| Tirreno–Adriatico | — | 56 | 38 | 28 |
| Volta a Catalunya | — | — | 11 | 16 |
| Tour of the Basque Country | — | — | 66 | 85 |
| Tour de Romandie | 10 | 4 | 12 | 8 |
| Critérium du Dauphiné | — | 14 | 38 | 15 |
| Tour de Suisse | 16 | 2 | 13 | 4 |
| Tour de Pologne | — | — | 12 | 7 |
| Eneco Tour | — | — | 15 | 2 |
Monument races by highest finishing position
| Race | 2013 | 2014 | 2015 | 2016 |
| Milan–San Remo | 13 | 21 | 23 | 7 |
| Tour of Flanders | 6 | 19 | 10 | 22 |
| Paris–Roubaix | 11 | 44 | 5 | 6 |
| Liège–Bastogne–Liège | 22 | 20 | 24 | 116 |
| Giro di Lombardia | 26 | 29 | 55 | DNF |
Classics by highest finishing position
| Classic | 2013 | 2014 | 2015 | 2016 |
| Omloop Het Nieuwsblad | 6 | 26 | 25 | 13 |
| Kuurne–Brussels–Kuurne | NH | 12 | 10 | 9 |
| Strade Bianche | 5 | 25 | — | — |
| E3 Harelbeke | 11 | 29 | 20 | 11 |
| Gent–Wevelgem | 4 | 52 | 20 | 14 |
| Amstel Gold Race | 50 | 36 | 35 | 35 |
| La Flèche Wallonne | 24 | 15 | 17 | 29 |
| Clásica de San Sebastián | — | — | 37 | 10 |
| Paris–Tours | 6 | 5 | 7 | 3 |

== National champions ==
2013
Austrian Time Trial Matthias Brändle
Swedish Time Trial Gustav Larsson
Latvian Road Race Aleksejs Saramotins
2014
French Time Trial Sylvain Chavanel
Austrian Time Trial Matthias Brändle
Swiss Road Race Martin Elmiger
2015
Australian Road Race Heinrich Haussler
French Time Trial Jérôme Coppel
Latvian Road Race Aleksejs Saramotins
2016
Austrian Road Race Matthias Brändle
Austrian Time Trial Matthias Brändle
Swiss Road Race Jonathan Fumeaux
