= 2014 Omega Pharma–Quick-Step season =

Omega Pharma–Quick-Step
- 2014 season
- Manager: Patrick Lefevere

Season victories
- One-day races: 9
- Stage race overall: 5
- Stage race stages: 42

The 2014 season for Omega Pharma–Quick-Step began in January at the Tour de San Luis. As a UCI ProTeam, they were automatically invited and obliged to send a squad to every event in the UCI World Tour.

== 2014 roster ==
As of 1 September 2014.

Rider	Date of birth
Julian Alaphilippe (FRA)	11 June 1992 (aged 22)
Jan Bakelants (BEL)	14 February 1986 (aged 28)
Tom Boonen (BEL)	15 October 1980 (aged 33)
Gianluca Brambilla (ITA)	22 August 1987 (aged 27)
Mark Cavendish (GBR)	21 May 1985 (aged 29)
Thomas De Gendt (BEL)	6 November 1986 (aged 27)
Kevin De Weert (BEL)	27 May 1982 (aged 32)
Andrew Fenn (GBR)	1 July 1990 (aged 24)
Michał Gołaś (POL)	29 September 1984 (aged 29)
Iljo Keisse (BEL)	21 December 1982 (aged 31)
Michał Kwiatkowski (POL)	2 June 1990 (aged 24)
Nikolas Maes (BEL)	9 April 1986 (aged 28)
Tony Martin (GER)	23 April 1985 (aged 29)
Gianni Meersman (BEL)	5 December 1985 (aged 28)
Serge Pauwels (BEL)	23 November 1983 (aged 30)

Rider	Date of birth
Alessandro Petacchi (ITA)	3 January 1974 (aged 40)
Wout Poels (NED)	1 October 1987 (aged 26)
Mark Renshaw (AUS)	22 October 1982 (aged 31)
Pieter Serry (BEL)	21 November 1988 (aged 25)
Gert Steegmans (BEL)	30 September 1980 (aged 33)
Zdeněk Štybar (CZE)	11 December 1985 (aged 28)
Niki Terpstra (NED)	18 May 1984 (aged 30)
Matteo Trentin (ITA)	2 August 1989 (aged 25)
Rigoberto Urán (COL)	26 January 1987 (aged 27)
Petr Vakoč (CZE)	11 July 1992 (aged 22)
Guillaume Van Keirsbulck (BEL)	14 February 1991 (aged 23)
Stijn Vandenbergh (BEL)	25 April 1984 (aged 30)
Martin Velits (SVK)	21 February 1985 (aged 29)
Julien Vermote (BEL)	26 July 1989 (aged 25)
Carlos Verona (ESP)	4 November 1992 (aged 21)

Riders who joined the team for the 2014 season

Rider	2013 team
Julian Alaphilippe	neo-pro (Etixx–IHNed)
Jan Bakelants	RadioShack–Leopard
Thomas De Gendt	Vacansoleil–DCM
Wout Poels	Vacansoleil–DCM
Mark Renshaw	Belkin Pro Cycling
Rigoberto Urán	Team Sky
Petr Vakoč	neo-pro (Etixx–IHNed)

Riders who left the team during or after the 2013 season

Rider	2014 team
Sylvain Chavanel	IAM Cycling
Dries Devenyns	Giant–Shimano
Bert Grabsch	Retired
Jérôme Pineau	IAM Cycling
František Raboň	Specialized Racing Factory Mountain Bike Team
Kristof Vandewalle	Trek Factory Racing
Peter Velits	BMC Racing Team

== Season victories ==
Date	Race	Competition	Rider	Country	Location
9 February	Tour of Qatar, Stage 1	UCI Asia Tour	Niki Terpstra (NED)	Qatar	Dukhan Beach
10 February	Tour of Qatar, Stage 2	UCI Asia Tour	Tom Boonen (BEL)	Qatar	Al Khor Corniche
11 February	Trofeo Serra de Tramuntana	UCI Europe Tour	Michał Kwiatkowski (POL)	Spain	Santuari de Lluc
12 February	Trofeo Muro-Port d'Alcúdia	UCI Europe Tour	Gianni Meersman (BEL)	Spain	Alcúdia
12 February	Tour of Qatar, Stage 4	UCI Asia Tour	Tom Boonen (BEL)	Qatar	Mesaieed
14 February	Tour of Qatar, Overall	UCI Asia Tour	Niki Terpstra (NED)	Qatar	
14 February	Tour of Qatar, Points classification	UCI Asia Tour	Tom Boonen (BEL)	Qatar	
14 February	Tour of Qatar, Young rider classification	UCI Asia Tour	Guillaume Van Keirsbulck (BEL)	Qatar	
14 February	Tour of Qatar, Teams classification	UCI Asia Tour	(Note: The riders on the squad were Tom Boonen, Andrew Fenn, Iljo Keisse, Nikolas Maes, Gert Steegmans, Niki Terpstra, Guillaume Van Keirsbulck and Stijn Vandenbergh)	Qatar	
20 February	Volta ao Algarve, Stage 2	UCI Europe Tour	Michał Kwiatkowski (POL)	Portugal	Monchique
21 February	Volta ao Algarve, Stage 3	UCI Europe Tour	Michał Kwiatkowski (POL)	Portugal	Sagres
23 February	Volta ao Algarve, Stage 5	UCI Europe Tour	Mark Cavendish (GBR)	Portugal	Vilamoura
23 February	Volta ao Algarve, Overall	UCI Europe Tour	Michał Kwiatkowski (POL)	Portugal	
2 March	Kuurne–Brussels–Kuurne	UCI Europe Tour	Tom Boonen (BEL)	Belgium	Kuurne
8 March	Strade Bianche	UCI Europe Tour	Michał Kwiatkowski (POL)	Italy	Siena
9 March	Driedaagse van West-Vlaanderen, Stage 2	UCI Europe Tour	Guillaume Van Keirsbulck (BEL)	Belgium	Ichtegem
9 March	Driedaagse van West-Vlaanderen, Young rider classification	UCI Europe Tour	Guillaume Van Keirsbulck (BEL)	Belgium	
12 March	Tirreno–Adriatico, Stage 1	UCI World Tour	Team time trial (Note: The riders on the squad were Rigoberto Urán, Mark Cavendish, Michał Kwiatkowski, Tony Martin, Alessandro Petacchi, Wout Poels, Mark Renshaw and Matteo Trentin)	Italy	San Vincenzo
17 March	Tirreno–Adriatico, Stage 6	UCI World Tour	Mark Cavendish (GBR)	Italy	Porto Sant'Elpidio
26 March	Dwars door Vlaanderen	UCI Europe Tour	Niki Terpstra (NED)	Belgium	Waregem
3 April	Three Days of De Panne, Overall	UCI Europe Tour	Guillaume Van Keirsbulck (BEL)	Belgium	
3 April	Three Days of De Panne, Teams classification	UCI Europe Tour	(Note: The riders on the squad were Andrew Fenn, Martin Velits, Mark Renshaw, Gert Steegmans, Niki Terpstra, Guillaume Van Keirsbulck and Julien Vermote)	Belgium	
8 April	Tour of the Basque Country, Stage 2	UCI World Tour	Tony Martin (GER)	Spain	Urdazubi
10 April	Tour of the Basque Country, Stage 4	UCI World Tour	Wout Poels (NED)	Spain	Eibar
12 April	Grand Prix Pino Cerami	UCI Europe Tour	Alessandro Petacchi (ITA)	Belgium	Frameries
12 April	Tour of the Basque Country, Stage 6	UCI World Tour	Tony Martin (GER)	Spain	Markina-Xemein
12 April	Tour of the Basque Country, Points classification	UCI World Tour	Michał Kwiatkowski (POL)	Spain	
13 April	Paris–Roubaix	UCI World Tour	Niki Terpstra (NED)	France	Roubaix
27 April	Tour of Turkey, Stage 1	UCI Europe Tour	Mark Cavendish (GBR)	Turkey	Alanya
28 April	Tour of Turkey, Stage 2	UCI Europe Tour	Mark Cavendish (GBR)	Turkey	Kemer
29 April	Tour de Romandie, Prologue	UCI World Tour	Michał Kwiatkowski (POL)	Switzerland	Ascona
30 April	Tour of Turkey, Stage 4	UCI Europe Tour	Mark Cavendish (GBR)	Turkey	Marmaris
4 May	Tour of Turkey, Stage 8	UCI Europe Tour	Mark Cavendish (GBR)	Turkey	Istanbul
4 May	Tour of Turkey, Points classification	UCI Europe Tour	Mark Cavendish (GBR)	Turkey	
11 May	Tour of California, Stage 1	UCI America Tour	Mark Cavendish (GBR)	United States	Sacramento
18 May	Tour of California, Stage 8	UCI America Tour	Mark Cavendish (GBR)	United States	Thousand Oaks
22 May	Giro d'Italia, Stage 12	UCI World Tour	Rigoberto Urán (COL)	Italy	Barolo
28 May	Tour of Belgium, Stage 1	UCI Europe Tour	Tom Boonen (BEL)	Belgium	Buggenhout
29 May	Tour of Belgium, Stage 2	UCI Europe Tour	Tom Boonen (BEL)	Belgium	Knokke-Heist
30 May	Tour of Belgium, Stage 3	UCI Europe Tour	Tony Martin (GER)	Belgium	Diksmuide
1 June	Tour of Belgium, Overall	UCI Europe Tour	Tony Martin (GER)	Belgium	
1 June	Tour of Belgium, Teams classification	UCI Europe Tour	(Note: The riders on the squad were Tony Martin, Gianni Meersman, Tom Boonen, Niki Terpstra, Jan Bakelants, Gert Steegmans, Stijn Vandenbergh and Andrew Fenn)	Belgium	
1 June	Giro d'Italia, Trofeo Super Team classification	UCI World Tour	(Note: The riders on the squad were Rigoberto Urán, Gianluca Brambilla, Thomas De Gendt, Iljo Keisse, Serge Pauwels, Alessandro Petacchi, Wout Poels, Pieter Serry and Julien Vermote)	Italy	
13 June	Critérium du Dauphiné, Stage 6	UCI World Tour	Jan Bakelants (BEL)	France	Poisy
14 June	Tour de Suisse, Stage 1	UCI World Tour	Tony Martin (GER)	Switzerland	Bellinzona
17 June	Tour de Suisse, Stage 4	UCI World Tour	Mark Cavendish (GBR)	Switzerland	Ossingen
19 June	Tour de Suisse, Stage 6	UCI World Tour	Matteo Trentin (ITA)	Switzerland	Delémont
20 June	Tour de Suisse, Stage 7	UCI World Tour	Tony Martin (GER)	Switzerland	Worb
11 July	Tour de France, Stage 7	UCI World Tour	Matteo Trentin (ITA)	France	Nancy
13 July	Tour de France, Stage 9	UCI World Tour	Tony Martin (GER)	France	Mulhouse
26 July	Tour de France, Stage 20	UCI World Tour	Tony Martin (GER)	France	Périgueux
30 July	Tour de Wallonie, Stage 5	UCI Europe Tour	Gianni Meersman (BEL)	Belgium	Ans
30 July	Tour de Wallonie, Overall	UCI Europe Tour	Gianni Meersman (BEL)	Belgium	
30 July	Tour de Wallonie, Points classification	UCI Europe Tour	Gianni Meersman (BEL)	Belgium	
4 August	Tour de Pologne, Stage 2	UCI World Tour	Petr Vakoč (CZE)	Poland	Warsaw
12 August	Eneco Tour, Stage 2	UCI World Tour	Zdeněk Štybar (CZE)	Netherlands	Vlijmen
12 August	Tour de l'Ain, Prologue	UCI Europe Tour	Gianni Meersman (BEL)	France	Saint-Amour
14 August	Tour de l'Ain, Stage 2	UCI Europe Tour	Gianni Meersman (BEL)	France	Saint-Vulbas
16 August	Tour de l'Ain, Stage 4	UCI Europe Tour	Julian Alaphilippe (FRA)	France	Arbent
16 August	Tour de l'Ain, Points classification	UCI Europe Tour	Julian Alaphilippe (FRA)	France	
16 August	Tour de l'Ain, Young rider classification	UCI Europe Tour	Julian Alaphilippe (FRA)	France	
17 August	Eneco Tour, Stage 7	UCI World Tour	Guillaume Van Keirsbulck (BEL)	Netherlands	Sittard-Geleen
24 August	Châteauroux Classic	UCI Europe Tour	Iljo Keisse (BEL)	France	Châteauroux
26 August	Tour du Poitou-Charentes, Stage 1	UCI Europe Tour	Mark Cavendish (GBR)	France	La Ronde
27 August	Tour du Poitou-Charentes, Stage 2	UCI Europe Tour	Mark Cavendish (GBR)	France	Niort
29 August	Tour du Poitou-Charentes, Points classification	UCI Europe Tour	Mark Cavendish (GBR)	France	
2 September	Vuelta a España, Stage 10	UCI World Tour	Tony Martin (GER)	Spain	Borja
8 September	Tour of Britain, Stage 2	UCI Europe Tour	Mark Renshaw (AUS)	United Kingdom	Llandudno
10 September	Tour of Britain, Stage 4	UCI Europe Tour	Michał Kwiatkowski (POL)	United Kingdom	Bristol
13 September	Tour of Britain, Stage 7	UCI Europe Tour	Julien Vermote (BEL)	United Kingdom	Brighton
14 September	Tour of Britain, Points classification	UCI Europe Tour	Michał Kwiatkowski (POL)	United Kingdom	
7 October	Binche–Chimay–Binche	UCI Europe Tour	Zdeněk Štybar (CZE)	Belgium	Binche
14 October	Tour of Beijing, Mountains classification	UCI World Tour	Michał Gołaś (POL)	China	
