= 2014 in men's road cycling =

== World Championships ==
The World Road Championships were held in Ponferrada, Spain, from 21 to 28 September 2014.

Race	Date	Winner	Second	Third	Ref
World Championship Team Time Trial	September 21	(United States) BMC Racing Team	(Australia) Orica–GreenEDGE	(Belgium) Omega Pharma–Quick-Step	
World Championship Time Trial	September 24	Bradley Wiggins (GBR)	Tony Martin (GER)	Tom Dumoulin (NED)	
World Championship Road Race	September 28	Michał Kwiatkowski (POL)	Simon Gerrans (AUS)	Alejandro Valverde (ESP)	

== Grand Tours ==
Race	Date	Winner	Second	Third	Ref
(Italy) Giro d'Italia	May 9 – June 1	Nairo Quintana (COL)	Rigoberto Urán (COL)	Fabio Aru (ITA)	
Tour de France	July 5–27	Vincenzo Nibali (ITA)	Jean-Christophe Péraud (FRA)	Thibaut Pinot (FRA)	
(Spain) Vuelta a España	August 23 – September 14	Alberto Contador (ESP)	Chris Froome (GBR)	Alejandro Valverde (ESP)	

== UCI World Tour ==
Race	Date	Winner	Second	Third	Ref
(Australia) Tour Down Under	January 21–26	Simon Gerrans (AUS)	Cadel Evans (AUS)	Diego Ulissi (ITA)	
(France) Paris–Nice	March 9–16	Carlos Betancur (COL)	Rui Costa (POR)	Arthur Vichot (FRA)	
(Italy) Tirreno–Adriatico	March 12–18	Alberto Contador (ESP)	Nairo Quintana (COL)	Roman Kreuziger (CZE)	
(Italy) Milan–San Remo	March 23	Alexander Kristoff (NOR)	Fabian Cancellara (SUI)	Ben Swift (GBR)	
(Spain) Volta a Catalunya	March 24–30	Joaquim Rodríguez (ESP)	Alberto Contador (ESP)	Tejay van Garderen (USA)	
(Belgium) E3 Harelbeke	March 28	Peter Sagan (SVK)	Niki Terpstra (NED)	Geraint Thomas (GBR)	
(Belgium) Gent–Wevelgem	March 30	John Degenkolb (GER)	Arnaud Démare (FRA)	Peter Sagan (SVK)	
(Belgium) Tour of Flanders	April 6	Fabian Cancellara (SUI)	Greg Van Avermaet (BEL)	Sep Vanmarcke (BEL)	
(Spain) Tour of the Basque Country	April 7–12	Alberto Contador (ESP)	Michał Kwiatkowski (POL)	Jean-Christophe Péraud (FRA)	
(France) Paris–Roubaix	April 13	Niki Terpstra (NED)	John Degenkolb (GER)	Fabian Cancellara (SUI)	
(Netherlands) Amstel Gold Race	April 20	Philippe Gilbert (BEL)	Jelle Vanendert (BEL)	Simon Gerrans (AUS)	
(Belgium) La Flèche Wallonne	April 23	Alejandro Valverde (ESP)	Dan Martin (IRL)	Michał Kwiatkowski (POL)	
(Belgium) Liège–Bastogne–Liège	April 27	Simon Gerrans (AUS)	Alejandro Valverde (ESP)	Michał Kwiatkowski (POL)	
(Switzerland) Tour de Romandie	April 29 – May 5	Chris Froome (GBR)	Simon Špilak (SLO)	Rui Costa (POR)	
(Italy) Giro d'Italia	May 9 – June 1	Nairo Quintana (COL)	Rigoberto Urán (COL)	Fabio Aru (ITA)	
(France) Critérium du Dauphiné	June 8–15	Andrew Talansky (USA)	Alberto Contador (ESP)	Jurgen Van den Broeck (BEL)	
(Switzerland) Tour de Suisse	June 14–22	Rui Costa (POR)	Mathias Frank (SUI)	Bauke Mollema (NED)	
Tour de France	July 5–27	Vincenzo Nibali (ITA)	Jean-Christophe Péraud (FRA)	Thibaut Pinot (FRA)	
(Spain) Clásica de San Sebastián	August 2	Alejandro Valverde (ESP)	Bauke Mollema (NED)	Joaquim Rodríguez (ESP)	
(Poland) Tour de Pologne	August 3–9	Rafał Majka (POL)	Jon Izaguirre (SPA)	Benat Intxausti (SPA)	
(Belgium) (Netherlands) Eneco Tour	August 11–17	Tim Wellens (BEL)	Lars Boom (NED)	Tom Dumoulin (NED)	
(Spain) Vuelta a España	August 23 – September 14	Alberto Contador (ESP)	Chris Froome (GBR)	Alejandro Valverde (ESP)	
(Germany) Vattenfall Cyclassics	August 24	Alexander Kristoff (NOR)	Giacomo Nizzolo (ITA)	Simon Gerrans (AUS)	
GP Ouest-France	August 31	Sylvain Chavanel (FRA)	Andrea Fedi (ITA)	Arthur Vichot (FRA)	
(Canada) GP de Québec	September 12	Simon Gerrans (AUS)	Tom Dumoulin (NED)	Ramūnas Navardauskas (LTU)	
(Canada) GP de Montréal	September 14	Simon Gerrans (AUS)	Rui Costa (POR)	Tony Gallopin (FRA)	
(Italy) Giro di Lombardia	October 5	Dan Martin (IRL)	Alejandro Valverde (ESP)	Rui Costa (POR)	
(China) Tour of Beijing	October 10–14	Philippe Gilbert (BEL)	Dan Martin (IRL)	Esteban Chaves (COL)	

== 2.HC Category Races ==
Race	Date	Winner	Second	Third	Ref
Tour of Qatar	February 9–14	Niki Terpstra (NED)	Tom Boonen (BEL)	Jürgen Roelandts (BEL)	
Tour of Oman	February 18–23	Chris Froome (GBR)	Tejay van Garderen (USA)	Rigoberto Urán (COL)	
(Malaysia) Tour de Langkawi	February 27 – March 8	Samad Pourseyedi (IRN)	Merhawi Kudus (ERI)	Isaac Bolívar (COL)	
(France) Critérium International	March 29–30	Jean-Christophe Péraud (FRA)	Mathias Frank (SUI)	Tiago Machado (POR)	
(Belgium) Three Days of De Panne	April 1–3	Guillaume Van Keirsbulck (BEL)	Luke Durbridge (AUS)	Gert Steegmans (BEL)	
(Italy) Giro del Trentino	April 22–25	Cadel Evans (AUS)	Domenico Pozzovivo (ITA)	Przemysław Niemiec (POL)	
Presidential Tour of Turkey	April 27–May 4	Adam Yates (GBR)	Rein Taaramäe (EST)	Romain Hardy (FRA)	
(France) Four Days of Dunkirk	May 7–11	Arnaud Démare (FRA)	Sylvain Chavanel (FRA)	Michael Valgren (DEN)	
(United States) Tour of California	May 11–18	Bradley Wiggins (GBR)	Rohan Dennis (AUS)	Lawson Craddock (USA)	
Tour of Norway	May 21–25	Maciej Paterski (POL)	Marc de Maar (NED)	Bauke Mollema (NED)	
Tour of Belgium	May 28–June 1	Tony Martin (GER)	Tom Dumoulin (NED)	Sylvain Chavanel (FRA)	
(Germany) Bayern Rundfahrt	May 28–June 1	Geraint Thomas (GBR)	Mathias Frank (SUI)	Vasil Kiryienka (BLR)	
Tour de Luxembourg	June 4–8	Matti Breschel (DEN)	Jempy Drucker (LUX)	Michael Mørkøv (DEN)	
(Austria) Österreich Rundfahrt	July 6–13	Peter Kennaugh (GBR)	Javier Moreno (ESP)	Damiano Caruso (ITA)	
(China) Tour of Qinghai Lake	July 6–19	Ilya Davidenok (KAZ)	Mykhaylo Kononenko (UKR)	Thomas Vaubourzeix (FRA)	
(Belgium) Tour de Wallonie	July 26–30	Gianni Meersman (BEL)	Juan José Lobato (ESP)	Silvan Dillier (SUI)	
(Denmark) Danmark Rundt	August 6–10	Michael Valgren (DEN)	Lars Bak (DEN)	Manuele Boaro (ITA)	
(Spain) Vuelta a Burgos	August 13–17	Nairo Quintana (COL)	Daniel Moreno (ESP)	Janez Brajkovič (SLO)	
(United States) USA Pro Cycling Challenge	August 18–24	Tejay van Garderen (USA)	Tom Danielson (USA)	Serghei Tvetcov (ROM)	
(United Kingdom) Tour of Britain	September 7–14	Dylan van Baarle (NED)	Michał Kwiatkowski (POL)	Bradley Wiggins (GBR)	
(China) Tour of Hainan	October 20–28	Julien Antomarchi (FRA)	Niccolò Bonifazio (ITA)	Andrey Zeits (KAZ)	

== 1.HC Category Races ==
Race	Date	Winner	Second	Third	Ref
(Belgium) Omloop Het Nieuwsblad	March 1	Ian Stannard (GBR)	Greg Van Avermaet (BEL)	Edvald Boasson Hagen (NOR)	
(Spain) Clásica de Almería	March 2	Sam Bennett (IRL)	Juan José Lobato (ESP)	Davide Viganò (ITA)	
(Belgium) Dwars door Vlaanderen	March 26	Niki Terpstra (NED)	Tyler Farrar (USA)	Borut Božič (SLO)	
(Belgium) Scheldeprijs	April 9	Marcel Kittel (GER)	Tyler Farrar (USA)	Danny van Poppel (NED)	
(Belgium) Brabantse Pijl	April 16	Philippe Gilbert (BEL)	Michael Matthews (AUS)	Tony Gallopin (FRA)	
(Germany) Rund um den Finanzplatz	May 1	Alexander Kristoff (NOR)	John Degenkolb (GER)	Jérôme Baugnies (BEL)	
(Switzerland) GP du canton d'Argovie	June 12	Simon Geschke (GER)	Silvan Dillier (SUI)	Jérôme Baugnies (BEL)	
(United Kingdom) Prudential RideLondon	August 10	Adam Blythe (GBR)	Ben Swift (GBR)	Julian Alaphilippe (FRA)	
(Belgium) Brussels Cycling Classic	September 6	André Greipel (GER)	Elia Viviani (ITA)	Arnaud Démare (FRA)	
(France) Grand Prix de Fourmies	September 7	Jonas Vangenechten (BEL)	Tom Van Asbroeck (BEL)	Elia Viviani (ITA)	
(Italy) Tre Valli Varesine	September 18	Michael Albasini (SUI)	Sonny Colbrelli (ITA)	Filippo Pozzato (ITA)	
(Italy) Milano–Torino	October 1	Giampaolo Caruso (ITA)	Rinaldo Nocentini (ITA)	Daniel Moreno (ESP)	
(Italy) Giro dell'Emilia	October 11	Davide Rebellin (ITA)	Ángel Madrazo (ESP)	Franco Pellizotti (ITA)	
(Italy) Gran Premio Bruno Beghelli	October 12	Valerio Conti (ITA)	Kristijan Koren (SLO)	Ilnur Zakarin (RUS)	
(France) Paris–Tours	October 12	Jelle Wallays (BEL)	Thomas Voeckler (FRA)	Jens Debusschere (BEL)	
Japan Cup	October 19	Nathan Haas (AUS)	Edvald Boasson Hagen (NOR)	Grega Bole (SLO)	

== UCI tours ==
Tour	Individual champion	Individual champion's team	Team champion	Nations champion
World Tour	Alejandro Valverde (ESP)	Movistar Team	Movistar Team	Spain
UCI Africa Tour				
UCI America Tour				
UCI Asia Tour				
UCI Europe Tour	Tom Van Asbroeck (BEL)	Topsport Vlaanderen–Baloise	Topsport Vlaanderen–Baloise	Italy
UCI Oceania Tour				

== Continental Championships ==
=== African Championships ===
Race	Date	Winner	Second	Third
Road race	December 5, 2013	Tesfom Okbamariam (ERI)	Dan Craven (NAM)	Merhawi Kudus (ERI)
Individual time trial	December 1, 2013	Daniel Teklehaymanot (ERI)	Willie Smit (ZAF)	Johannes Nel (ZAF)
Team time trial	November 29, 2013	Eritrea national team Natnael Berhane; Daniel Teklehaymanot; Meron Russom; Meron Teshome	Algeria national team Adil Barbari; Azzedine Lagab; Abdelmalek Madani; Hichem Chaabane	South Africa national team Johannes Christoffel Nell; Shaun-Nick Bester; Calvin Beneke; Ryan Gibbons

=== Asian Championships ===
Race	Date	Winner	Second	Third
Road race	June 1	Ruslan Tleubayev (KAZ)	Maxim Iglinsky (KAZ)	Dmitriy Gruzdev (KAZ)
Individual time trial	May 29	Dmitriy Gruzdev (KAZ)	Eugen Wacker (KGZ)	Choe Hyeong-min (KOR)

=== European Championships (under-23) ===
Race	Date	Winner	Second	Third
Road race (under-23)	July 13	Stefan Küng (SUI)	Iuri Filosi (ITA)	Anthony Turgis (FRA)
Individual time trial (under-23)	July 11	Stefan Küng (SUI)	Davide Martinelli (ITA)	Alexander Evtushenko (RUS)

=== Oceania Championships ===
Race	Date	Winner	Second	Third
Road race	February 23	Luke Durbridge (AUS)	Bernard Sulzberger (AUS)	Brenton Jones (AUS)
Individual time trial	February 21	Joseph Cooper (NZL)	Will Clarke (AUS)	Lachlan Norris (AUS)

=== Pan American Championships ===
Race	Date	Winner	Second	Third	Ref
Road race	May 11	Byron Guamá (ECU)	Joey Rosskopf (USA)	Juan Pablo Suárez (COL)	
Individual time trial	May 8	Pedro Herrera (COL)	Joey Rosskopf (USA)	Carlos Oyarzun (CHI)	

== World University Cycling Championship ==
Championships	Race	Date	Winner	Second	Third
World University Cycling Championship	Road race	July 10, 2014	Petr Vakoč (CZE)	Tim Gebauer (GER)	Emanuel Piaskowy (POL)
World University Cycling Championship	Individual time trial	July 9, 2014	Petr Vakoč (CZE)	Tim Gebauer (GER)	Adrian Kurek (POL)

== International Games ==
=== Asian Games ===
Race	Winner	Second	Third
Road race	Jang Gyung-Gu (KOR)	Arvin Moazemi (IRI)	Leung Chun Wing (HKG)
Time trial	Alexey Lutsenko (KAZ)	Eugen Wacker (KGZ)	Hossein Askari (IRI)

=== Central American and Caribbean Games ===
Race	Winner	Second	Third	Ref
Road race	Carlos Galviz (VEN)	Florencio Ramos (MEX)	Manuel Rodas (GUA)	
Time trial	Brayan Ramírez (COL)	Fernando Gaviria (COL)	Bernardo Colex (MEX)	

=== Commonwealth Games ===
Race	Winner	Second	Third
Road race	Geraint Thomas (WAL)	Jack Bauer (NZL)	Scott Thwaites (ENG)
Time trial	Alex Dowsett (ENG)	Rohan Dennis (AUS)	Geraint Thomas (WAL)

=== South American Games ===
Race	Winner	Second	Third	Ref
Road race	Gonzalo Garrido (CHI)	Luis Felipe Laverde (COL)	Jackson Rodríguez (VEN)	
Time trial	Murilo Ferraz (BRA)	Carlos Oyarzun (CHI)	Brayan Ramírez (COL)	

=== South Asian Games ===
Race	Winner	Second	Third
Road race			
Time trial			

=== Summer Youth Olympics ===
Race	Winner	Second	Third
Road race			
Time trial			

== UCI Teams ==
=== UCI ProTeams ===
2014 UCI Pro Teams and equipment
Code	Official team name	Licence holder	Country	Groupset	Bicycles
ALM	Ag2r–La Mondiale (2014 season)	EUSRL France Cyclisme	France	Campagnolo	Focus
AST	Astana (2014 season)	Abacanto SA	Kazakhstan	Campagnolo	Specialized
BEL	Belkin Pro Cycling (2014 season)	Rabo Wielerploegen	Netherlands	Shimano	Bianchi
BMC	BMC Racing Team (2014 season)	Continuum Sports LLC	United States	Shimano	BMC
CAN	Cannondale (2014 season)	Brixia Sports	Italy	SRAM	Cannondale
EUC	Team Europcar (2014 season)	SA Vendée Cyclisme	France	Campagnolo	Colnago
FDJ	FDJ.fr (2014 season)	Société de Gestion de L'Echappée	France	Shimano	Lapierre
GIA	Giant–Shimano (2014 season)	SMS Cycling B.V.	Netherlands	Shimano	Giant
GRS	Garmin–Sharp (2014 season)	Slipstream Sports, LLC	United States	Shimano	Cervélo
KAT	Team Katusha (2014 season)	Katusha Management SA	Russia	Shimano	Canyon
LAM	Lampre–Merida (2014 season)	CGS Cycling Team AG	Italy	Shimano	Merida
LTB	Lotto–Belisol (2014 season)	Belgian Cycling Company sa	Belgium	Campagnolo	Ridley
MOV	Movistar Team (2014 season)	Abarca Sports S.L.	Spain	Campagnolo	Canyon
OGE	Orica–GreenEDGE (2014 season)	GreenEdge Cycling	Australia	Shimano	Scott
OPQ	Omega Pharma–Quick-Step (2014 season)	Esperanza bvba	Belgium	SRAM	Specialized
SKY	Team Sky (2014 season)	Tour Racing Limited	Great Britain	Shimano	Pinarello
TCS	Tinkoff–Saxo (2014 season)	Tinkoff Sport	Russia	SRAM	Specialized
TFR	Trek Factory Racing (2014 season)	Trek Bicycle Corporation	United States	Shimano	Trek

== See also ==
- 2014 in women's road cycling
