= 2014 Lampre–Merida season =

Lampre–Merida
- 2014 season
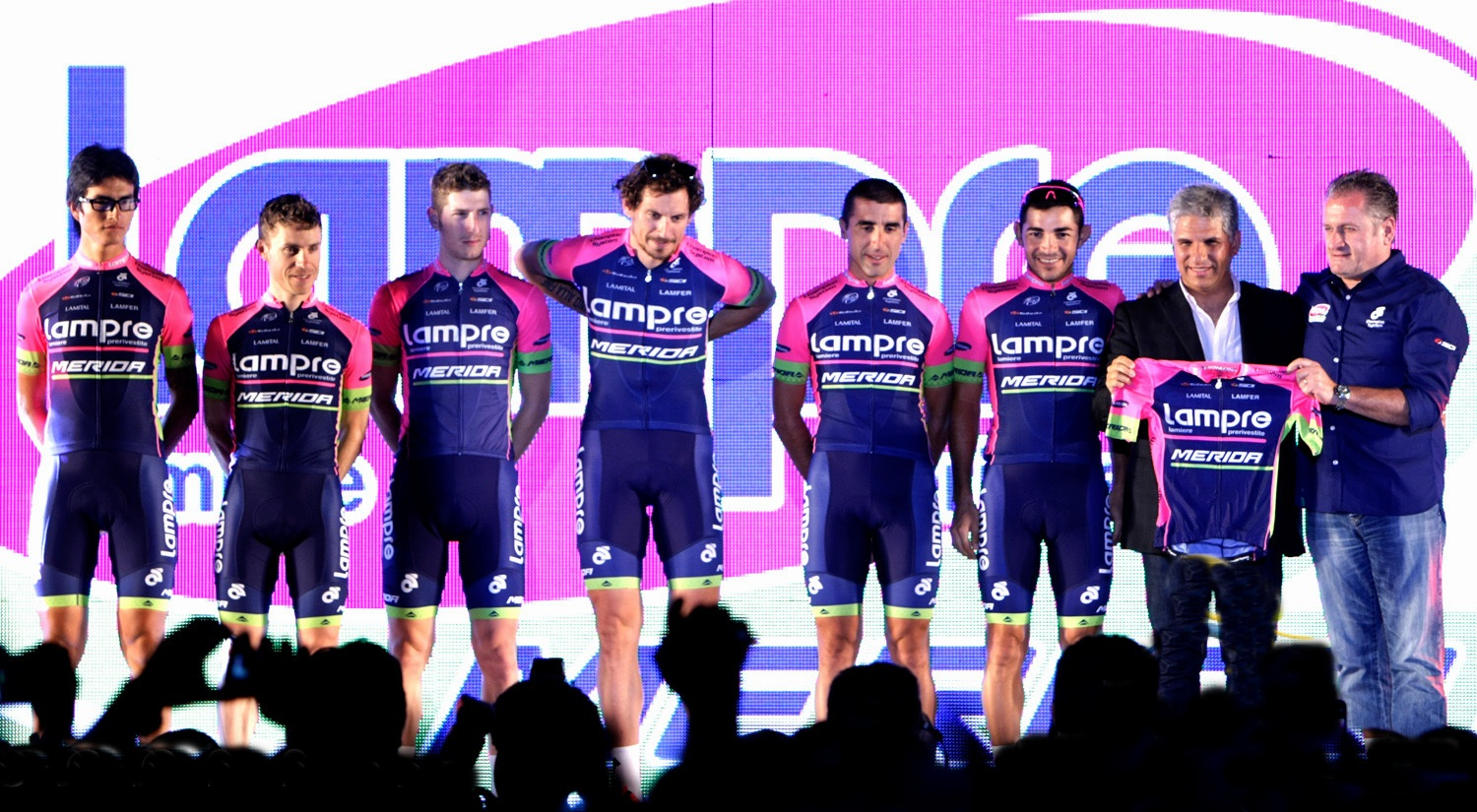
- The team at the 2014 Tour de San Luis.
- UCI code: LAM
- Status: UCI ProTeam
- Manager: Giuseppe Saronni
- Main sponsor(s): Lampre & Merida
- Based: Italy
- Bicycles: Merida
- Groupset: ?

Season victories
- One-day races: 6
- Stage race overall: 1
- Stage race stages: 17
- National Championships: 2

The 2014 season for Lampre–Merida began in January at the Tour de San Luis. As a UCI ProTeam, they were automatically invited and obligated to send a squad to every event in the UCI World Tour.

== Team roster ==
As of 30 January 2014

Rider	Date of birth
Winner Anacona (COL)	11 August 1988 (aged 25)
Niccolò Bonifazio (ITA)	29 October 1993 (aged 20)
Matteo Bono (ITA)	11 November 1983 (aged 30)
Mattia Cattaneo (ITA)	25 October 1990 (aged 23)
Davide Cimolai (ITA)	13 August 1989 (aged 24)
Valerio Conti (ITA)	30 March 1993 (aged 20)
Rui Costa (POR)	5 October 1986 (aged 27)
Damiano Cunego (ITA)	19 September 1981 (aged 32)
Luca Dodi (ITA)	26 May 1987 (aged 26)
Kristijan Đurasek (CRO)	26 July 1987 (aged 26)
Elia Favilli (ITA)	31 January 1989 (aged 24)
Roberto Ferrari (ITA)	9 March 1983 (aged 30)
Chris Horner (USA)	23 October 1971 (aged 42)

Rider	Date of birth
Sacha Modolo (ITA)	19 June 1987 (aged 26)
Manuele Mori (ITA)	9 August 1980 (aged 33)
Przemysław Niemiec (POL)	11 April 1980 (aged 33)
Nelson Oliveira (POR)	6 March 1989 (aged 24)
Andrea Palini (ITA)	16 June 1989 (aged 24)
Jan Polanc (SLO)	6 May 1992 (aged 21)
Filippo Pozzato (ITA)	10 September 1981 (aged 32)
Maximiliano Richeze (ARG)	7 March 1983 (aged 30)
José Serpa (COL)	17 April 1979 (aged 34)
Diego Ulissi (ITA)	15 July 1989 (aged 24)
Rafael Valls (ESP)	27 June 1987 (aged 26)
Luca Wackermann (ITA)	13 March 1992 (aged 21)
Xu Gang (CHN)	28 January 1984 (aged 29)

Riders who joined the team for the 2014 season

Rider	2013 team
Niccolo Bonifazio	neo-pro (Viris Vegevano)
Valerio Conti	neo-pro (Mastromarco-Chanti Sensi)
Rui Costa	Movistar Team
Chris Horner	RadioShack–Leopard
Sacha Modolo	Bardiani Valvole–CSF Inox
Nelson Oliveira	RadioShack–Leopard
Rafael Valls	Vacansoleil–DCM
Gang Xu	Champion System

Riders who left the team during or after the 2013 season

Rider	2014 team
Massimo Graziato	
Matthew Lloyd	Jelly Belly–Maxxis
Adriano Malori	Movistar Team
Alessandro Petacchi	Retired (until August); Omega Pharma–Quick-Step (from August)
Daniele Pietropolli	
Michele Scarponi	Astana
Simone Stortoni	
Miguel Ubeto	Suspended
Davide Viganò	Caja Rural–Seguros RGA

== Season victories ==
Date	Race	Competition	Rider	Country	Location
22 January	Tour Down Under, Stage 2	UCI World Tour	Diego Ulissi (ITA)	Australia	Stirling
26 January	Tour de San Luis, Stage 7	UCI America Tour	Sacha Modolo (ITA)	Argentina	Terrazas del Portezuelo
9 February	Trofeo Palma de Mallorca	UCI Europe Tour	Sacha Modolo (ITA)	Spain	Palma de Mallorca
10 February	Trofeo Ses Salines	UCI Europe Tour	Sacha Modolo (ITA)	Spain	Santanyí
19 February	Volta ao Algarve, Stage 1	UCI Europe Tour	Sacha Modolo (ITA)	Portugal	Albufeira
21 February	Trofeo Laigueglia	UCI Europe Tour	José Serpa (COL)	Italy	Liguria
23 February	Volta ao Algarve, Points classification	UCI Europe Tour	Rui Costa (POR)	Portugal	
23 February	Volta ao Algarve, Teams classification	UCI Europe Tour	(Note: The riders on the squad were Rui Costa, Mattia Cattaneo, Chris Horner, Roberto Ferrari, Sacha Modolo, Jan Polanc, Maximiliano Richeze and Nelson Oliveira)	Portugal	
6 March	Gran Premio Città di Camaiore	UCI Europe Tour	Diego Ulissi (ITA)	Italy	Camaiore
2 April	Three Days of De Panne, Stage 2	UCI Europe Tour	Sacha Modolo (ITA)	Belgium	Koksijde–Oostduinkerke
3 April	Three Days of De Panne, Stage 3a	UCI Europe Tour	Sacha Modolo (ITA)	Belgium	De Panne
3 April	Three Days of De Panne, Points classification	UCI Europe Tour	Sacha Modolo (ITA)	Belgium	
14 May	Giro d'Italia, Stage 5	UCI World Tour	Diego Ulissi (ITA)	Italy	Viggiano
17 May	Giro d'Italia, Stage 8	UCI World Tour	Diego Ulissi (ITA)	Italy	Montecopiolo
25 May	Tour of Japan, Stage 6	UCI Asia Tour	Niccolò Bonifazio (ITA)	Japan	Tokyo
18 June	Tour de Suisse, Stage 5	UCI World Tour	Sacha Modolo (ITA)	Switzerland	Büren an der Aare
22 June	Tour de Suisse, Stage 9	UCI World Tour	Rui Costa (POR)	Switzerland	Saas-Fee
22 June	Tour de Suisse, Overall	UCI World Tour	Rui Costa (POR)	Switzerland	
10 August	Tour of Utah, Teams classification	UCI America Tour	(Note: The riders on the squad were Chris Horner, Winner Anacona, Valerio Conti, Luca Dodi, Ilia Koshevoy, Andrea Palini, Andrea Vaccher and Luca Wackermann)	United States	
31 August	Vuelta a España, Stage 9	UCI World Tour	Winner Anacona (COL)	Spain	Aramón Valdelinares
7 September	Vuelta a España, Stage 15	UCI World Tour	Przemysław Niemiec (POL)	Spain	Lagos de Covadonga
17 September	Coppa Ugo Agostoni	UCI Europe Tour	Niccolò Bonifazio (ITA)	Italy	Lissone
12 October	Gran Premio Bruno Beghelli	UCI Europe Tour	Valerio Conti (ITA)	Italy	Monteveglio
14 October	Tour of Beijing, Stage 5	UCI World Tour	Sacha Modolo (ITA)	China	Bird's Nest Piazza
21 October	Tour of Hainan, Stage 2	UCI Asia Tour	Niccolò Bonifazio (ITA)	China	Haikou
24 October	Tour of Hainan, Stage 5	UCI Asia Tour	Andrea Palini (ITA)	China	Sanya
25 October	Tour of Hainan, Stage 6	UCI Asia Tour	Niccolò Bonifazio (ITA)	China	Dongfang
27 October	Tour of Hainan, Stage 8	UCI Asia Tour	Niccolò Bonifazio (ITA)	China	Danzhou
28 October	Tour of Hainan, Points classification	UCI Asia Tour	Niccolò Bonifazio (ITA)	China	
