= 2014 Tour of Belgium =

2014 UCI Europe Tour

Race details
- Dates: 28 May – 1 June
- Stages: 5
- Distance: 714.6 km (444.0 mi)
- Winning time: 16h 31' 11"

Results
Jersey awarded to the overall winner	Winner	Tony Martin (GER)	(Omega Pharma–Quick-Step)
	Second	Tom Dumoulin (NED)	(Giant–Shimano)
	Third	Sylvain Chavanel (FRA)	(IAM Cycling)
Jersey awarded to the points classification winner	Points	Philippe Gilbert (BEL)	(BMC Racing Team)
Jersey awarded to the youth classification winner	Youth	Tom Dumoulin (NED)	(Giant–Shimano)
Jersey awarded to the combativity classification winner	Combativity	Yves Lampaert (BEL)	(Topsport Vlaanderen–Baloise)
	Team	Omega Pharma–Quick-Step	

The 2014 Tour of Belgium was the 84th edition of the Tour of Belgium cycling stage race. It took place from 28 May to 1 June 2014 in Belgium, and was a part of the 2014 UCI Europe Tour.

== Schedule ==
Stage	Course	Distance	Type	Date	Winner
1	Lochristi to Buggenhout	172.6 km (107.2 mi)	Flat stage	Wednesday, 28 May	Tom Boonen (BEL)
2	Lierde to Knokke-Heist	170.4 km (105.9 mi)	Flat stage	Thursday, 29 May	Tom Boonen (BEL)
3	Diksmuide to Diksmuide	16.8 km (10.4 mi)	Individual time trial	Friday, 30 May	Tony Martin (GER)
4	Eau d'Heure lakes to Eau d'Heure lakes	177.1 km (110.0 mi)	Intermediate stage	Saturday, 31 May	André Greipel (GER)
5	Oreye to Oreye	177.7 km (110.4 mi)	Intermediate stage	Sunday, 1 June	Paul Martens (GER)

== Teams ==
20 teams were invited to the 2014 Tour of Belgium: 6 UCI ProTeams, 7 UCI Professional Continental Teams and 7 UCI Continental Teams.

UCI ProTeams
- Astana
- Belkin Pro Cycling
- BMC Racing Team
- Giant–Shimano
- Lotto–Belisol
- Omega Pharma–Quick-Step
UCI Professional Continental Teams
- Androni Giocattoli–Venezuela
- Cofidis
- IAM Cycling
- Neri Sottoli
- RusVelo
- Topsport Vlaanderen–Baloise
- Wanty–Groupe Gobert
UCI Continental Teams
- BKCP–Powerplus
- Cibel
- Kwadro-Stannah
- Team 3M
- Vastgoedservice–Golden Palace
- Veranclassic-Doltcini
- Wallonie-Bruxelles

== Stages ==
=== Stage 1 ===
28 May 2014 – Lochristi to Buggenhout, 172.6 km (107.2 mi)

Stage 1 Result

	Rider	Team	Time
1	Tom Boonen (BEL)	Omega Pharma–Quick-Step	3h 51' 43"
2	André Greipel (GER)	Lotto–Belisol	s.t.
3	Theo Bos (NED)	Belkin Pro Cycling	s.t.
4	Jonas Ahlstrand (SWE)	Giant–Shimano	s.t.
5	Andrea Guardini (ITA)	Astana	s.t.
6	Danilo Napolitano (ITA)	Wanty–Groupe Gobert	s.t.
7	Francesco Chicchi (ITA)	Neri Sottoli	s.t.
8	Michael Van Staeyen (BEL)	Topsport Vlaanderen–Baloise	s.t.
9	Sascha Weber (GER)	Veranclassic-Doltcini	s.t.
10	Gert Steegmans (BEL)	Omega Pharma–Quick-Step	s.t.

General Classification after Stage 1

	Rider	Team	Time
1	Tom Boonen (BEL)	Omega Pharma–Quick-Step	3h 51' 33"
2	André Greipel (GER)	Lotto–Belisol	+ 4"
3	Theo Bos (NED)	Belkin Pro Cycling	+ 6"
4	Niki Terpstra (NED)	Omega Pharma–Quick-Step	+ 7"
5	Greg Van Avermaet (BEL)	BMC Racing Team	+ 8"
6	Jan Bakelants (BEL)	Omega Pharma–Quick-Step	+ 9"
7	Jonas Ahlstrand (SWE)	Giant–Shimano	+ 10"
8	Andrea Guardini (ITA)	Astana	+ 10"
9	Danilo Napolitano (ITA)	Wanty–Groupe Gobert	+ 10"
10	Francesco Chicchi (ITA)	Neri Sottoli	+ 10"

=== Stage 2 ===
29 May 2014 – Lierde to Knokke-Heist, 170.4 km (105.9 mi)

Stage 2 Result

	Rider	Team	Time
1	Tom Boonen (BEL)	Omega Pharma–Quick-Step	3h 49' 33"
2	Gert Steegmans (BEL)	Omega Pharma–Quick-Step	s.t.
3	Theo Bos (NED)	Belkin Pro Cycling	s.t.
4	Michael Van Staeyen (BEL)	Topsport Vlaanderen–Baloise	s.t.
5	Thor Hushovd (NOR)	BMC Racing Team	s.t.
6	Danilo Napolitano (ITA)	Wanty–Groupe Gobert	s.t.
7	Louis Verhelst (BEL)	Cofidis	s.t.
8	Jonas Ahlstrand (SWE)	Giant–Shimano	s.t.
9	Florian Sénéchal (FRA)	Cofidis	s.t.
10	Klaas Lodewyck (BEL)	BMC Racing Team	s.t.

General Classification after Stage 2

	Rider	Team	Time
1	Tom Boonen (BEL)	Omega Pharma–Quick-Step	7h 40' 56"
2	Theo Bos (NED)	Belkin Pro Cycling	+ 12"
3	Gert Steegmans (BEL)	Omega Pharma–Quick-Step	+ 14"
4	André Greipel (GER)	Lotto–Belisol	+ 14"
5	Greg Van Avermaet (BEL)	BMC Racing Team	+ 15"
6	Niki Terpstra (NED)	Omega Pharma–Quick-Step	+ 16"
7	Philippe Gilbert (BEL)	BMC Racing Team	+ 18"
8	Jan Bakelants (BEL)	Omega Pharma–Quick-Step	+ 19"
9	Michael Van Staeyen (BEL)	Topsport Vlaanderen–Baloise	+ 20"
10	Danilo Napolitano (ITA)	Wanty–Groupe Gobert	+ 20"

=== Stage 3 ===
30 May 2014 – Diksmuide, 16.8 km (10.4 mi), individual time trial (ITT)

Stage 3 Result

	Rider	Team	Time
1	Tony Martin (GER)	Omega Pharma–Quick-Step	19' 43"
2	Tom Dumoulin (NED)	Giant–Shimano	+ 16"
3	Sylvain Chavanel (FRA)	IAM Cycling	+ 26"
4	Silvan Dillier (SUI)	BMC Racing Team	+ 44"
5	Matthias Brändle (AUT)	IAM Cycling	+ 47"
6	Philippe Gilbert (BEL)	BMC Racing Team	+ 48"
7	Cyril Lemoine (FRA)	Cofidis	+ 51"
8	Artem Ovechkin (RUS)	RusVelo	+ 51"
9	Chad Haga (USA)	Giant–Shimano	+ 53"
10	Reto Hollenstein (SUI)	IAM Cycling	+ 56"

General Classification after Stage 3

	Rider	Team	Time
1	Tony Martin (GER)	Omega Pharma–Quick-Step	8h 00' 59"
2	Tom Dumoulin (NED)	Giant–Shimano	+ 16"
3	Sylvain Chavanel (FRA)	IAM Cycling	+ 26"
4	Philippe Gilbert (BEL)	BMC Racing Team	+ 46"
5	Matthias Brändle (AUT)	IAM Cycling	+ 47"
6	Cyril Lemoine (FRA)	Cofidis	+ 51"
7	Artem Ovechkin (RUS)	RusVelo	+ 51"
8	Chad Haga (USA)	Giant–Shimano	+ 53"
9	Reto Hollenstein (SUI)	IAM Cycling	+ 56"
10	Jan Ghyselinck (BEL)	Wanty–Groupe Gobert	+ 56"

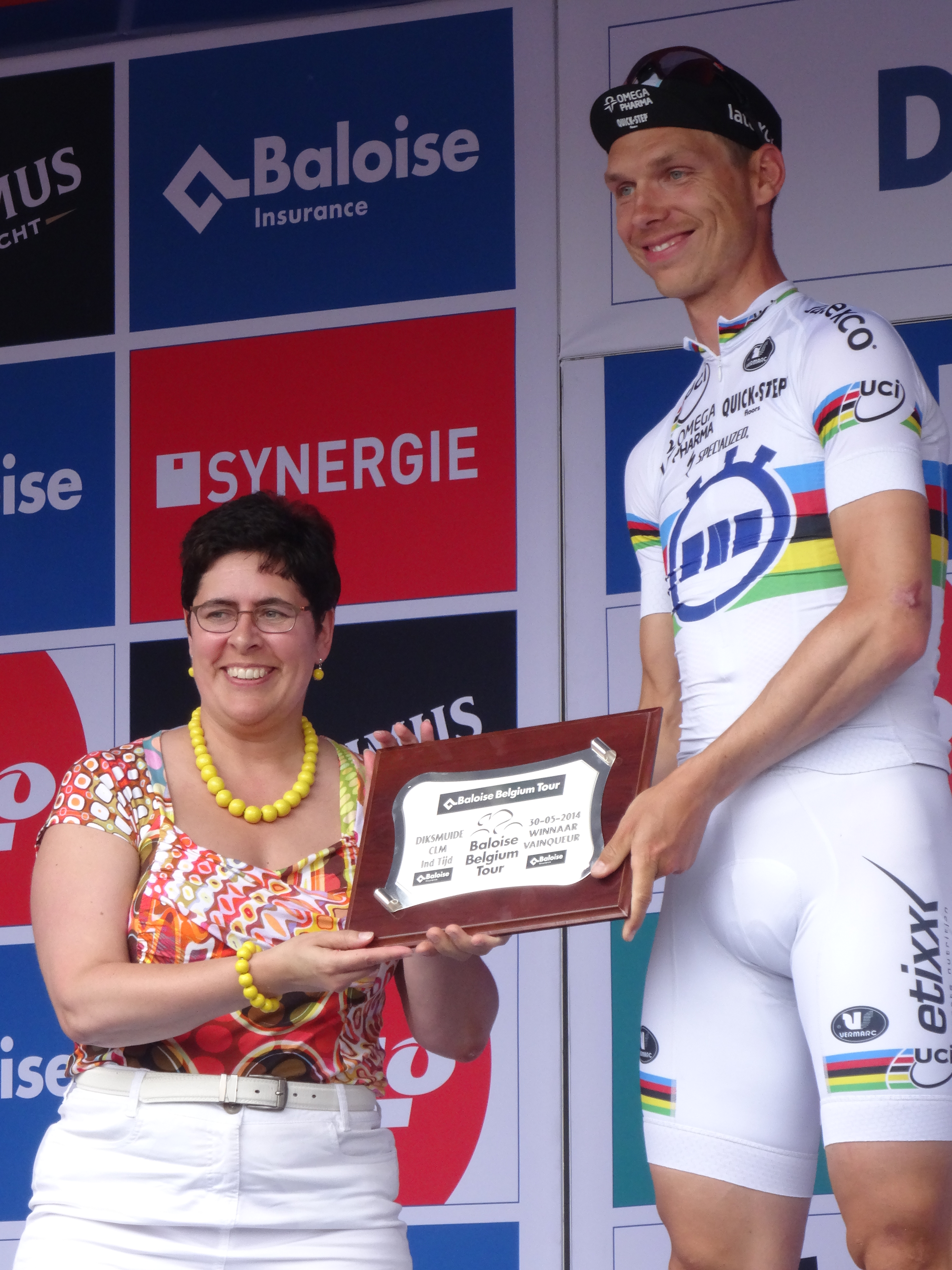

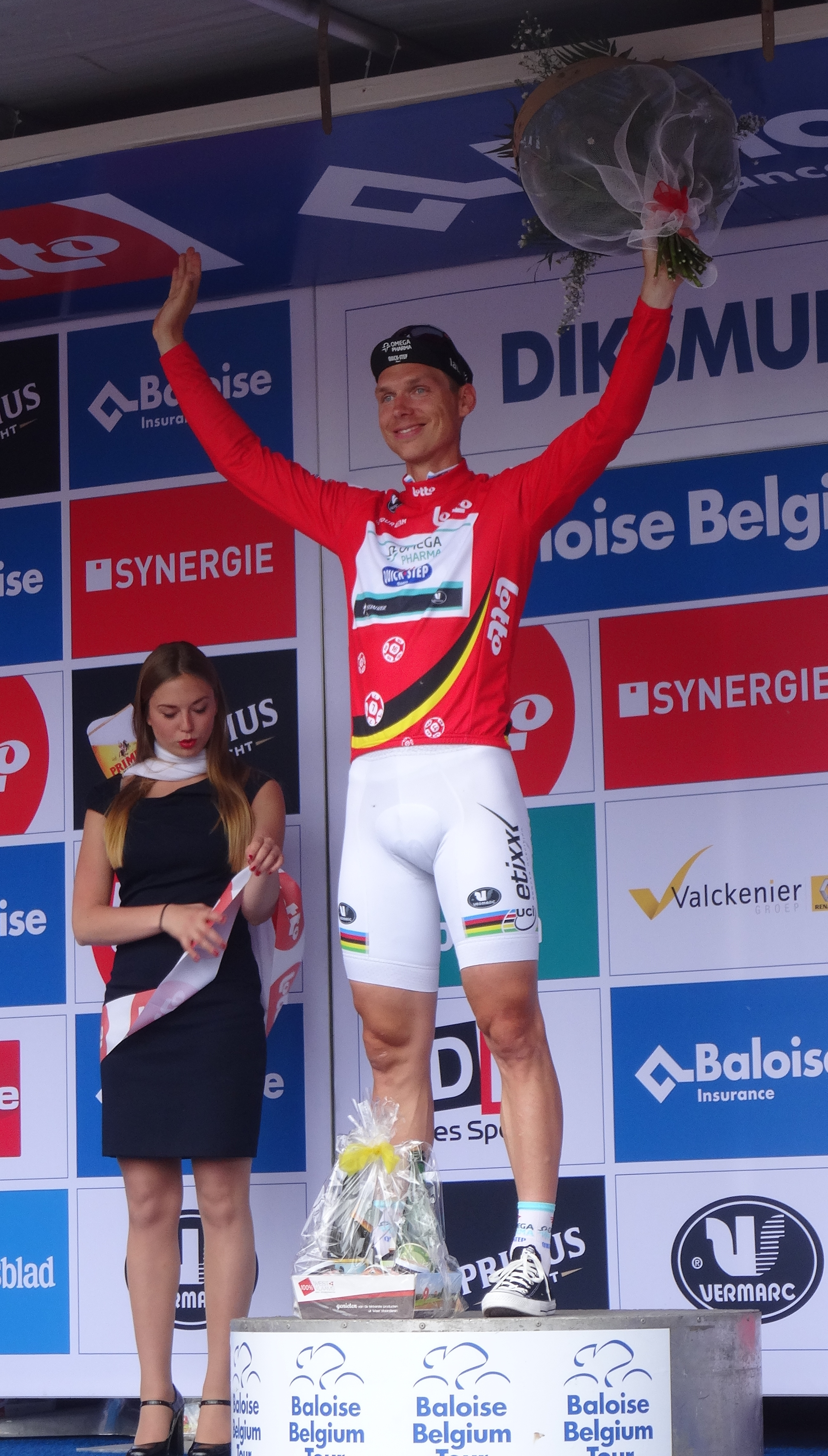

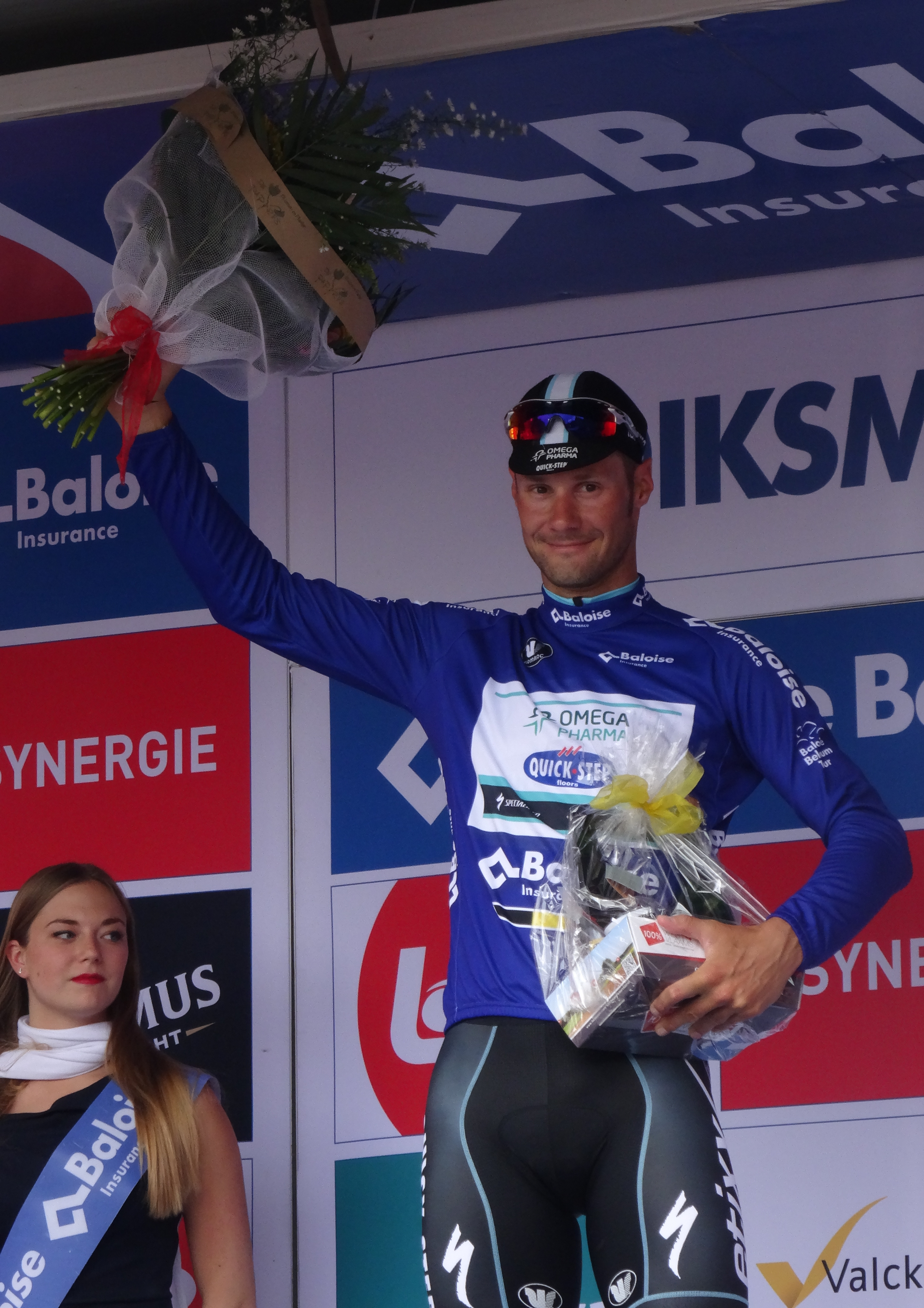

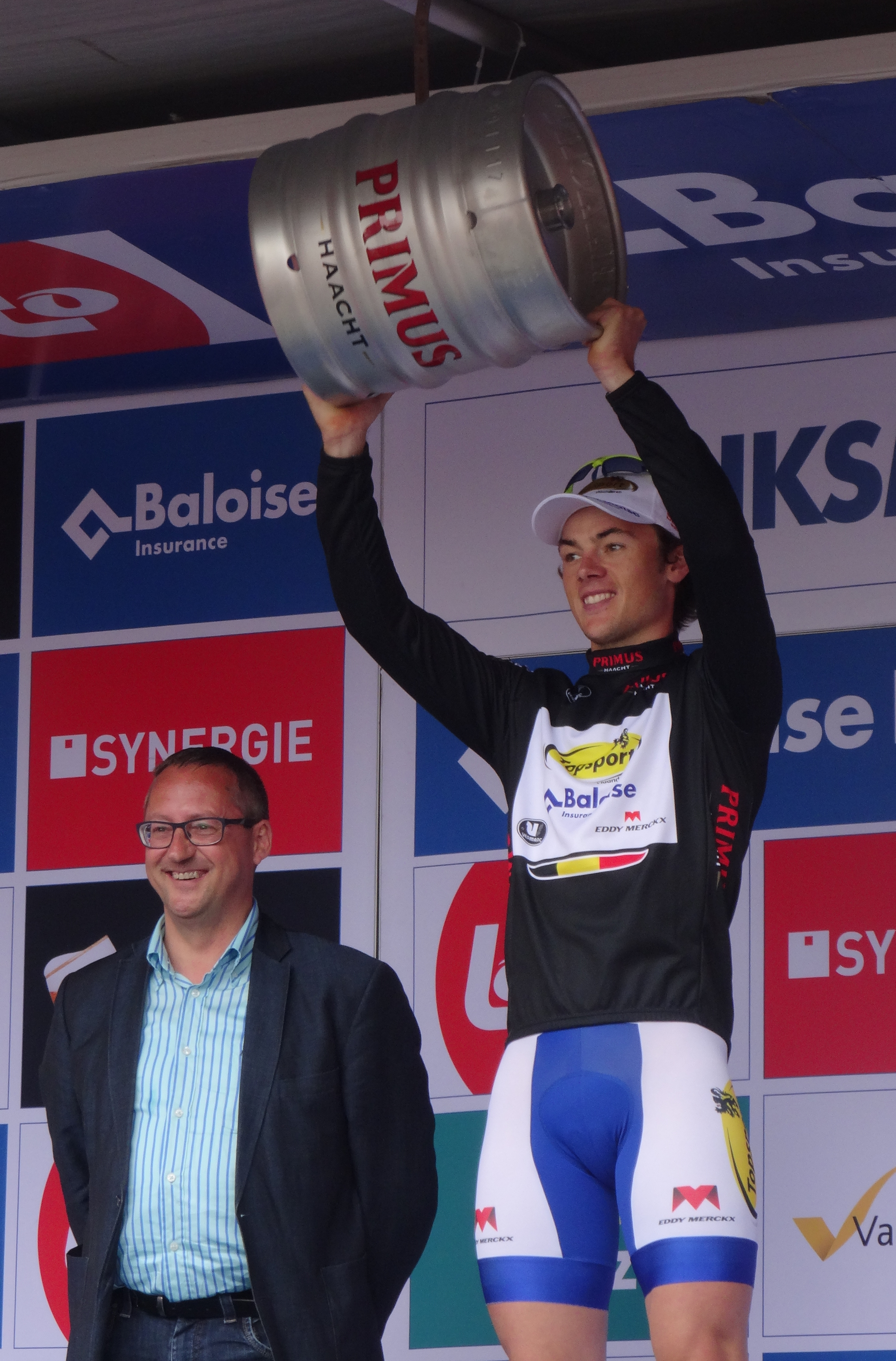

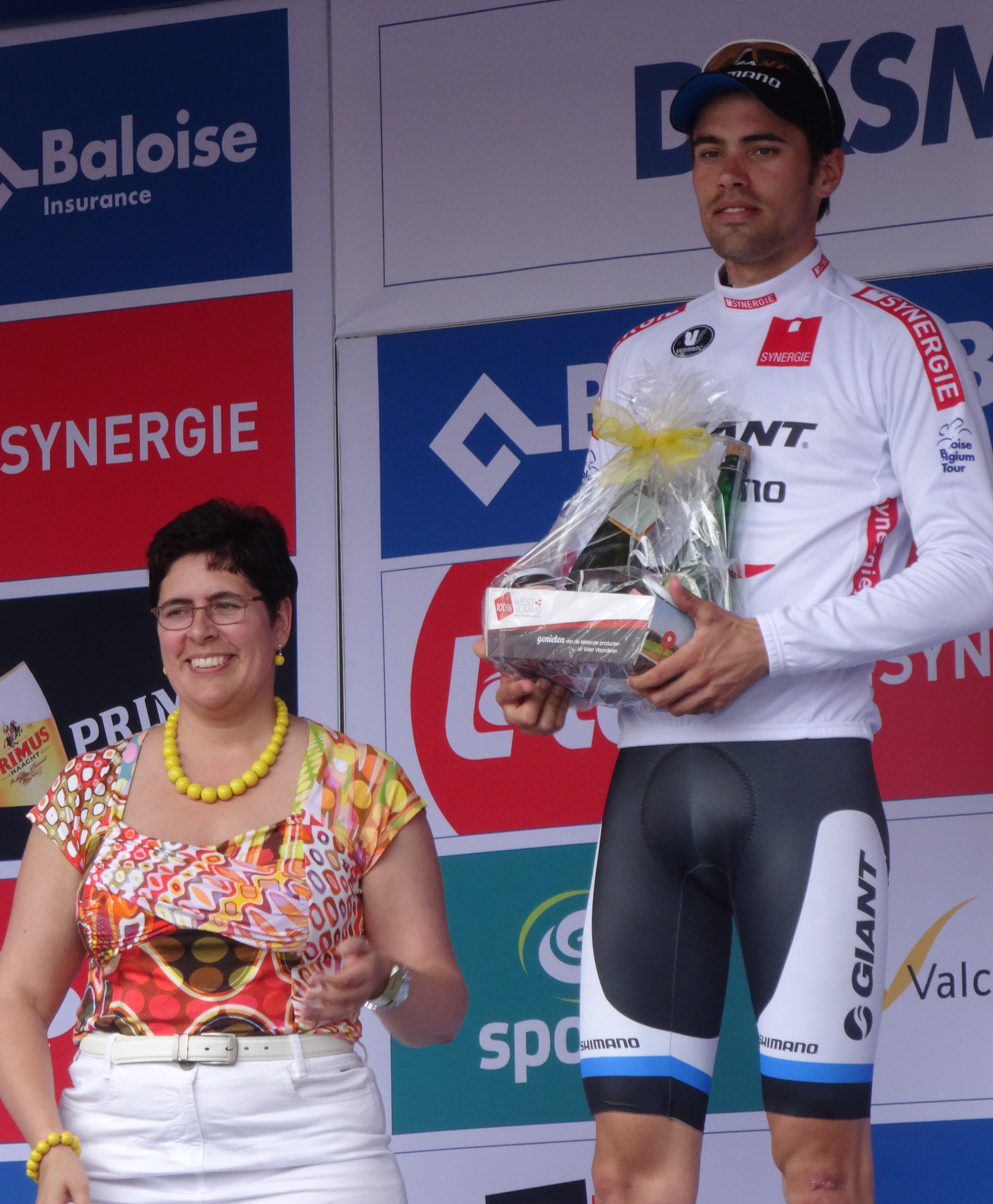

=== Stage 4 ===
31 May 2014 – Eau d'Heure lakes to Eau d'Heure lakes, 177.1 km (110.0 mi)

Stage 4 Result

	Rider	Team	Time
1	André Greipel (GER)	Lotto–Belisol	4h 16' 11"
2	Roman Maikin (RUS)	RusVelo	s.t.
3	Philippe Gilbert (BEL)	BMC Racing Team	s.t.
4	Mathieu van der Poel (NED)	BKCP–Powerplus	s.t.
5	Francesco Gavazzi (ITA)	Astana	s.t.
6	Kenneth Vanbilsen (BEL)	Topsport Vlaanderen–Baloise	s.t.
7	Koen de Kort (NED)	Giant–Shimano	s.t.
8	Gerry Druyts (BEL)	Team 3M	s.t.
9	Greg Van Avermaet (BEL)	BMC Racing Team	s.t.
10	Sascha Weber (GER)	Veranclassic-Doltcini	s.t.

General Classification after Stage 4

	Rider	Team	Time
1	Tony Martin (GER)	Omega Pharma–Quick-Step	12h 17' 10"
2	Tom Dumoulin (NED)	Giant–Shimano	+ 16"
3	Sylvain Chavanel (FRA)	IAM Cycling	+ 26"
4	Philippe Gilbert (BEL)	BMC Racing Team	+ 41"
5	Matthias Brändle (AUT)	IAM Cycling	+ 47"
6	Cyril Lemoine (FRA)	Cofidis	+ 51"
7	Artem Ovechkin (RUS)	RusVelo	+ 51"
8	Reto Hollenstein (SUI)	IAM Cycling	+ 56"
9	Jan Ghyselinck (BEL)	Wanty–Groupe Gobert	+ 56"
10	Niki Terpstra (NED)	Omega Pharma–Quick-Step	+ 56"

=== Stage 5 ===
1 June 2014 – Oreye to Oreye, 177.7 km (110.4 mi)

Stage 5 Result

	Rider	Team	Time
1	Paul Martens (GER)	Belkin Pro Cycling	4h 14' 01"
2	Francesco Gavazzi (ITA)	Astana	s.t.
3	Greg Van Avermaet (BEL)	BMC Racing Team	s.t.
4	Niki Terpstra (NED)	Omega Pharma–Quick-Step	s.t.
5	Kris Boeckmans (BEL)	Lotto–Belisol	s.t.
6	Philippe Gilbert (BEL)	BMC Racing Team	s.t.
7	Greg Henderson (NZL)	Lotto–Belisol	s.t.
8	Edward Theuns (BEL)	Topsport Vlaanderen–Baloise	s.t.
9	Marcel Meisen (GER)	Kwadro-Stannah	s.t.
10	Cyril Lemoine (FRA)	Cofidis	s.t.

Final General Classification

	Rider	Team	Time
1	Tony Martin (GER)	Omega Pharma–Quick-Step	16h 31' 11"
2	Tom Dumoulin (NED)	Giant–Shimano	+ 16"
3	Sylvain Chavanel (FRA)	IAM Cycling	+ 26"
4	Philippe Gilbert (BEL)	BMC Racing Team	+ 38"
5	Matthias Brändle (AUT)	IAM Cycling	+ 47"
6	Cyril Lemoine (FRA)	Cofidis	+ 51"
7	Artem Ovechkin (RUS)	RusVelo	+ 51"
8	Jan Ghyselinck (BEL)	Wanty–Groupe Gobert	+ 55"
9	Niki Terpstra (NED)	Omega Pharma–Quick-Step	+ 56"
10	Greg Van Avermaet (BEL)	BMC Racing Team	+ 57"

== Classification leadership table ==
Stage	Winner	General classification Algemeen klassement	Points classification Puntenklassement	Combativity classification Prijs van de strijdlust	Young rider classification Jongerenklassement	Teams classification Ploegenklassement
1	Tom Boonen	Tom Boonen	Tom Boonen	Pieter Vanspeybrouck	Jonas Ahlstrand	Omega Pharma–Quick-Step
2	Tom Boonen	Tom Boonen	Tom Boonen	Yves Lampaert	Jonas Ahlstrand	Omega Pharma–Quick-Step
3	Tony Martin	Tony Martin	Tom Boonen	Yves Lampaert	Tom Dumoulin	Omega Pharma–Quick-Step
4	André Greipel	Tony Martin	Philippe Gilbert	Yves Lampaert	Tom Dumoulin	Omega Pharma–Quick-Step
5	Paul Martens	Tony Martin	Philippe Gilbert	Yves Lampaert	Tom Dumoulin	Omega Pharma–Quick-Step
Final		Tony Martin	Philippe Gilbert	Yves Lampaert	Tom Dumoulin	Omega Pharma–Quick-Step

== Standings ==
Legend
Red jersey	Denotes the leader of the General classification	Blue jersey	Denotes the leader of the Points classification
Black jersey	Denotes the leader of the Combativity classification	White jersey	Denotes the leader of the Young rider classification

=== General classification ===
	Rider	Team	Time
1	Tony Martin (GER)	Omega Pharma–Quick-Step	16h 31' 11"
2	Tom Dumoulin (NED)	Giant–Shimano	+ 16"
3	Sylvain Chavanel (FRA)	IAM Cycling	+ 26"
4	Philippe Gilbert (BEL)	BMC Racing Team	+ 38"
5	Matthias Brändle (AUT)	IAM Cycling	+ 47"
6	Cyril Lemoine (FRA)	Cofidis	+ 51"
7	Artem Ovechkin (RUS)	RusVelo	+ 51"
8	Jan Ghyselinck (BEL)	Wanty–Groupe Gobert	+ 55"
9	Niki Terpstra (NED)	Omega Pharma–Quick-Step	+ 56"
10	Greg Van Avermaet (BEL)	BMC Racing Team	+ 57"

=== Points classification ===
	Rider	Team	Points
1	Philippe Gilbert (BEL)	BMC Racing Team	100
2	Greg Van Avermaet (BEL)	BMC Racing Team	72
3	Tom Boonen (BEL)	Omega Pharma–Quick-Step	60
4	Silvan Dillier (SUI)	BMC Racing Team	58
5	André Greipel (GER)	Lotto–Belisol	55
6	Niki Terpstra (NED)	Omega Pharma–Quick-Step	52
7	Francesco Gavazzi (ITA)	Astana	42
8	Gert Steegmans (BEL)	Omega Pharma–Quick-Step	35
9	Jonas Ahlstrand (SWE)	Giant–Shimano	31
10	Tony Martin (GER)	Omega Pharma–Quick-Step	30

=== Combativity classification ===
	Rider	Team	Points
1	Yves Lampaert (BEL)	Topsport Vlaanderen–Baloise	36
2	Frédéric Amorison (BEL)	Wallonie-Bruxelles	26
3	Marcel Aregger (SUI)	IAM Cycling	24
4	Sébastien Delfosse (BEL)	Wallonie-Bruxelles	22
5	Edwig Cammaerts (BEL)	Cofidis	22
6	Sascha Weber (GER)	Veranclassic-Doltcini	22
7	Pieter Vanspeybrouck (BEL)	Topsport Vlaanderen–Baloise	20
8	Marcus Burghardt (GER)	BMC Racing Team	18
9	Tim De Troyer (BEL)	Wanty–Groupe Gobert	18
10	Tom Dumoulin (NED)	Giant–Shimano	16

=== Young rider classification ===
	Rider	Team	Time
1	Tom Dumoulin (NED)	Giant–Shimano	16h 31' 27"
2	Matthias Brändle (AUT)	IAM Cycling	+ 31"
3	Florian Sénéchal (FRA)	Cofidis	+ 43"
4	Edward Theuns (BEL)	Topsport Vlaanderen–Baloise	+ 1' 04"
5	Ilnur Zakarin (RUS)	RusVelo	+ 1' 07"
6	Silvan Dillier (SUI)	BMC Racing Team	+ 1' 21"
7	Mathieu van der Poel (NED)	BKCP–Powerplus	+ 1' 25"
8	Wietse Bosmans (BEL)	BKCP–Powerplus	+ 1' 29"
9	Rudy Molard (FRA)	Cofidis	+ 1' 46"
10	Gianfranco Zilioli (ITA)	Androni Giocattoli–Venezuela	+ 2' 03"

=== Team classification ===
	Team	Points
1	Omega Pharma–Quick-Step	49h 35' 40"
2	BMC Racing Team	+ 48"
3	Cofidis	+ 57"
4	RusVelo	+ 1' 27"
5	Belkin Pro Cycling	+ 1' 31"
6	Wanty–Groupe Gobert	+ 1' 57"
7	IAM Cycling	+ 2' 01"
8	Giant–Shimano	+ 2' 23"
9	Lotto–Belisol	+ 3' 00"
10	Androni Giocattoli–Venezuela	+ 3' 31"
