= Stijn Steels =

Belgian cyclist

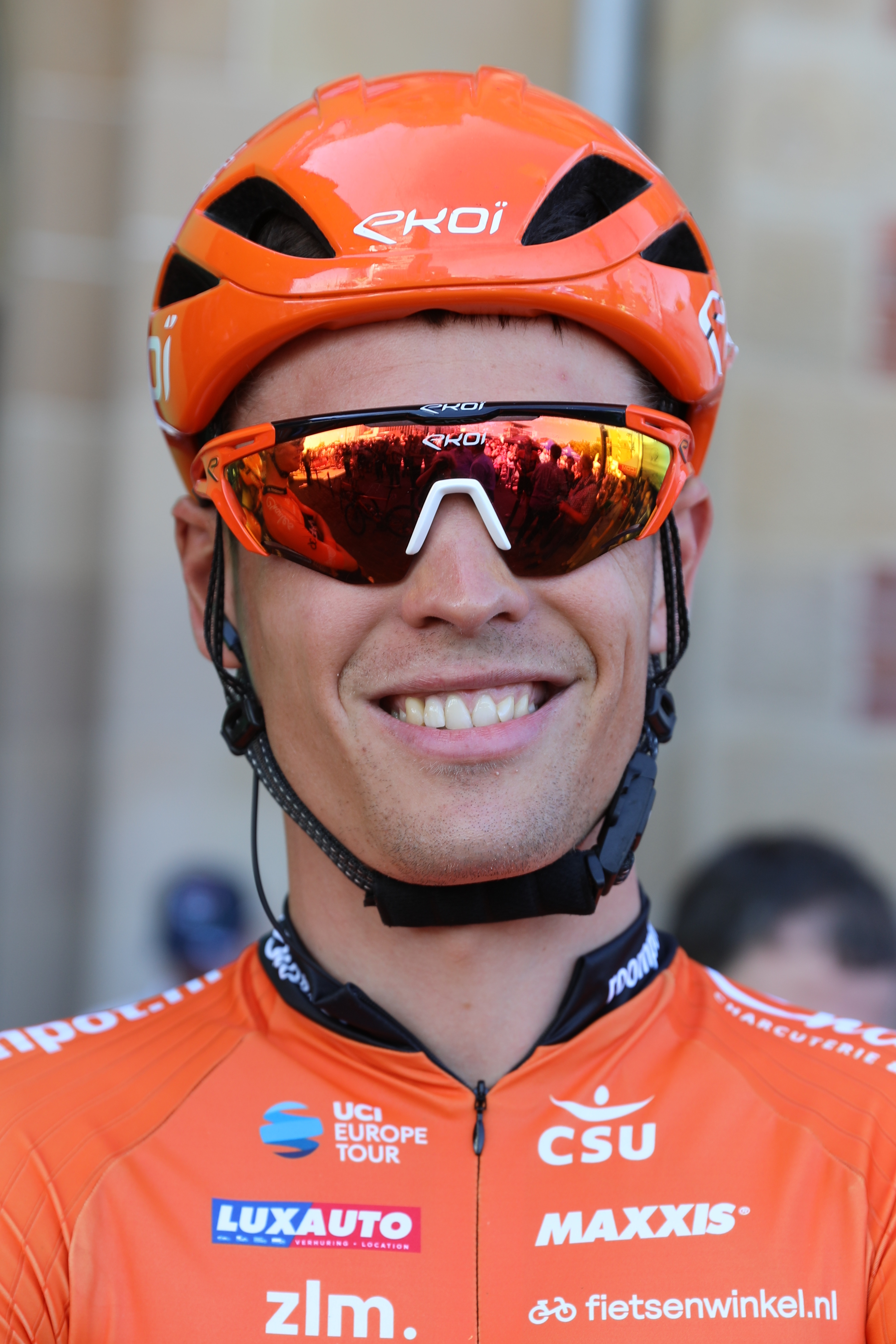
- Steels in 2019.

Personal information
- Full name: Stijn Steels
- Born: 21 August 1989 (age 37) Ghent, Belgium
- Height: 1.82 m (6 ft 0 in)
- Weight: 78 kg (172 lb)

Cycling career
- Sport: Cycling
- Current team: Retired
- Disciplines: Road; Track
- Role: Rider

Amateur teams
- 2007: Balen BC
- 2008–2009: Rock Werchter–Chocolade Jacques
- 2012: EFC–Omega Pharma–Quick-Step

Professional teams
- 2010: Qin Cycling Team
- 2011: Jong Vlaanderen–Bauknecht
- 2013: Crelan–Euphony
- 2014–2017: Topsport Vlaanderen–Baloise
- 2018: Vérandas Willems–Crelan
- 2019: Roompot–Charles
- 2020–2022: Deceuninck–Quick-Step

Stijn Steels (born 21 August 1989 in Ghent) is a Belgian former cyclist, who competed as a professional from 2010 to 2022. He is the nephew of former professional cyclist Tom Steels.

In August 2019, it was announced that Steels would move up to UCI World Tour level from 2020, signing a two-year contract with Deceuninck–Quick-Step, his seventh professional team.

== Major results ==
2010
2nd Dwars door het Hageland
4th Grote Prijs Stad Geel
2011
9th Overall Ronde de l'Isard
2012
4th Flèche Ardennaise
2013
3rd Antwerpse Havenpijl
6th Rund um Köln
2014
1st Sprints classification Three Days of De Panne
7th Polynormande
2015
1st Dwars door de Vlaamse Ardennen
2016
1st Grand Prix de la Ville de Lillers
3rd Schaal Sels
2017
8th Schaal Sels
2019
6th Memorial Rik Van Steenbergen
