= Vincent Jérôme =

French cyclist

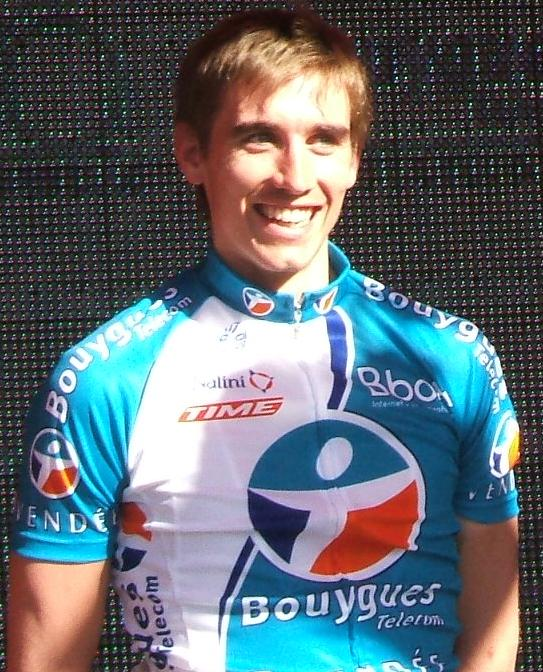
- Jérôme at the 2009 Tour Down Under

Personal information
- Full name: Vincent Jérôme
- Born: 26 November 1984 (age 41) Château-Gontier, France
- Height: 1.74 m (5 ft 9 in)
- Weight: 65 kg (143 lb)

Cycling career
- Sport: Cycling
- Current team: Retired
- Discipline: Road
- Role: Rider

Amateur teams
- 1990–1999: VC Château-Gontier
- 2000: OCC Laval
- 2001–2005: Vendée U–Pays de la Loire
- 2005: Bouygues Télécom (stagiaire)

Professional team
- 2006–2015: Bouygues Télécom

Major wins
- Tour du Doubs (2007)

Vincent Jérôme (born 26 November 1984 in Château-Gontier, Mayenne) is a French former road bicycle racer, who rode professionally between 2006 and 2015 for Team Europcarand its previous iterations. In 2007 he won the Tour du Doubs.

== Major results ==
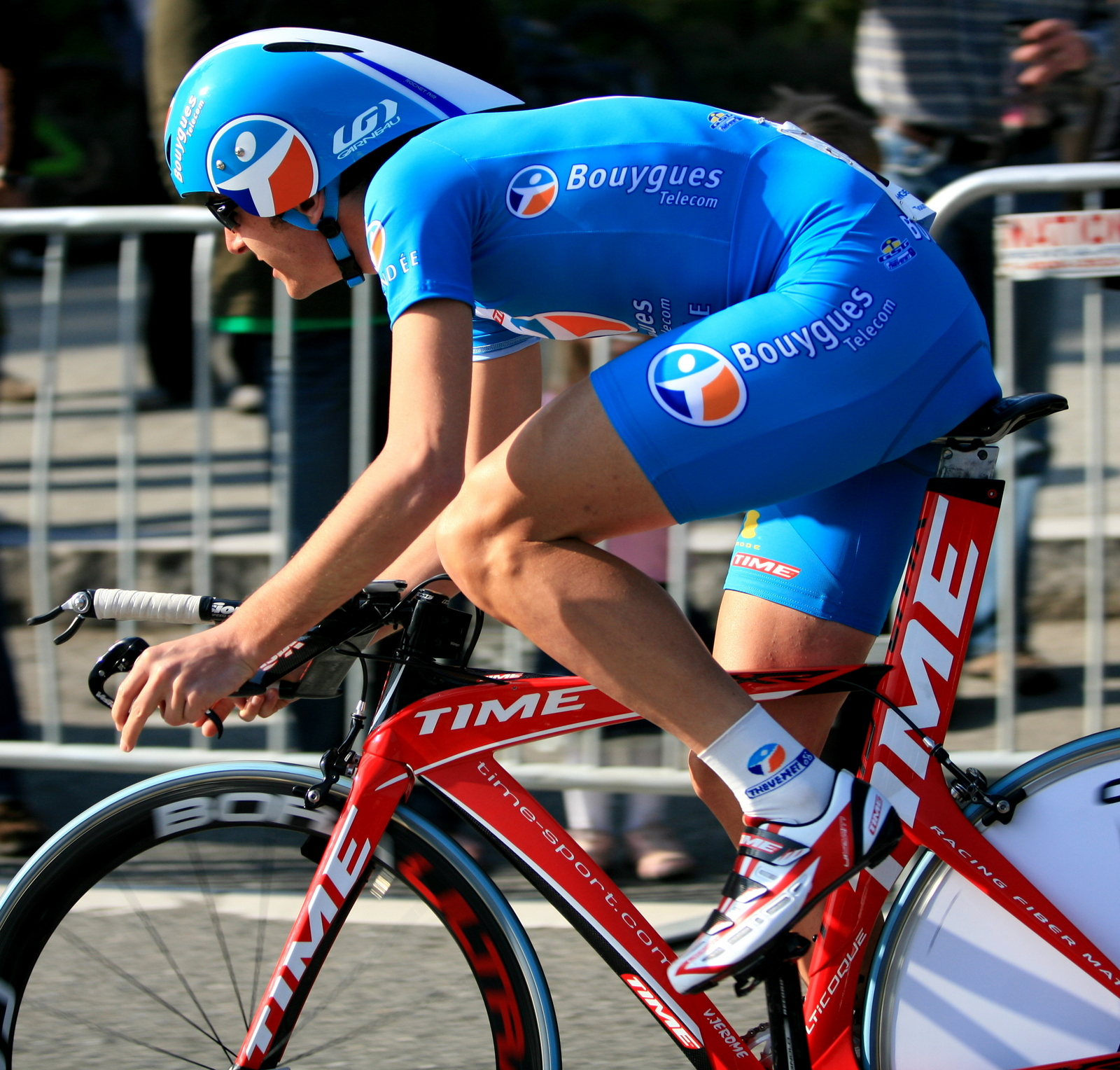
Jérôme in the 2008 Tour of California

2004
1st Paris–Tours Espoirs
8th Ronde van Vlaanderen U23
2005
4th La Roue Tourangelle
4th Grand Prix de Waregem
10th Ronde van Vlaanderen U23
10th Paris–Roubaix Espoirs
2007
1st Tour du Doubs
10th Trophée des Grimpeurs
2008
3rd Tour du Doubs
2009
6th Clásica de Almería
9th Overall Tour de Wallonie
2011
1st Tro-Bro Léon
2012
6th Overall Paris–Corrèze
2013
2nd Overall Ronde de l'Oise
2014
6th Overall Three Days of De Panne
8th Tro-Bro Léon
10th Grand Prix Impanis-Van Petegem

=== Grand Tour general classification results timeline ===
Grand Tour	2007	2008	2009	2010	2011	2012	2013	2014
Giro d'Italia	Did not contest during career							
Tour de France	—	—	—	—	155	DNF	—	—
Vuelta a España	113	76	DNF	94	—	—	—	91

Legend
—	Did not compete
DNF	Did not finish
