= 2011 Grote Prijs Jef Scherens =

Race details
- Dates: 4 September 2011
- Stages: 1
- Distance: 183.3 km (113.9 mi)
- Winning time: 4h 21' 00"

Results
| | Winner | Jérôme Pineau (FRA) |
| | Second | Kenny Dehaes (BEL) |
| | Third | Guillaume Van Keirsbulck (BEL) |

The 2011 Grote Prijs Jef Scherens was the 45th edition of the Grote Prijs Jef Scherens cycle race and was held on 4 September 2011. The race started and finished in Leuven. The race was won by Jérôme Pineau.

== General classification ==
Final general classification

| Rank | Rider | Time |
|---|---|---|
| 1 | Jérôme Pineau (FRA) | 4h 21' 00" |
| 2 | Kenny Dehaes (BEL) | + 0" |
| 3 | Guillaume Van Keirsbulck (BEL) | + 0" |
| 4 | Stefan van Dijk (NED) | + 0" |
| 5 | Michael Van Staeyen (BEL) | + 0" |
| 6 | Michael Matthews (AUS) | + 0" |
| 7 | Marcel Sieberg (GER) | + 0" |
| 8 | Pierpaolo De Negri (ITA) | + 0" |
| 9 | Kenneth Vanbilsen (BEL) | + 0" |
| 10 | Fabien Schmidt (FRA) | + 0" |
