= Paris–Roubaix Juniors =

French cycling race

Race details
- Date: Early April
- Region: Northern France
- Nickname: Le Pavé de Roubaix (in French)
- Discipline: Road race
- Competition: UCI Juniors Nations' Cup
- Type: Single-day
- Organiser: Vélo-Club de Roubaix Lille Métropole

History
- First edition: 2003
- Editions: 23 (as of 2026)
- First winner: Anthony Colin (FRA)
- Most wins: No repeat winners
- Most recent: Thijs Wiersma (NED)

Paris–Roubaix Juniors (or Le Pavé de Roubaix) is a single-day road bicycle race held annually in April in northern France for junior cyclists (aged 17 and 18) ahead of the senior Paris–Roubaix classic race. It is organised by the Vélo-Club de Roubaix Lille Métropole, who organize the under-23s version, Paris–Roubaix Espoirs.

In 2019, the race faced "imminent cancellation" due to difficulty finding sponsors. German cyclist John Degenkolb, 2015 winner of the elite Paris–Roubaix race, started a GoFundMe campaign to help fund the race. The fundraiser passed its goal of €10,000 within 24 hours, including €2,500 from Degenkolb himself. In 2020, the organizers of Paris–Roubaix named a 4-star sector of cobblestones after Degenkolb, in recognition of his efforts to help the junior race continue.

The 2020 edition was cancelled due to the COVID-19 pandemic, with the 2021 edition moved from April to 3 October.

== Winners ==
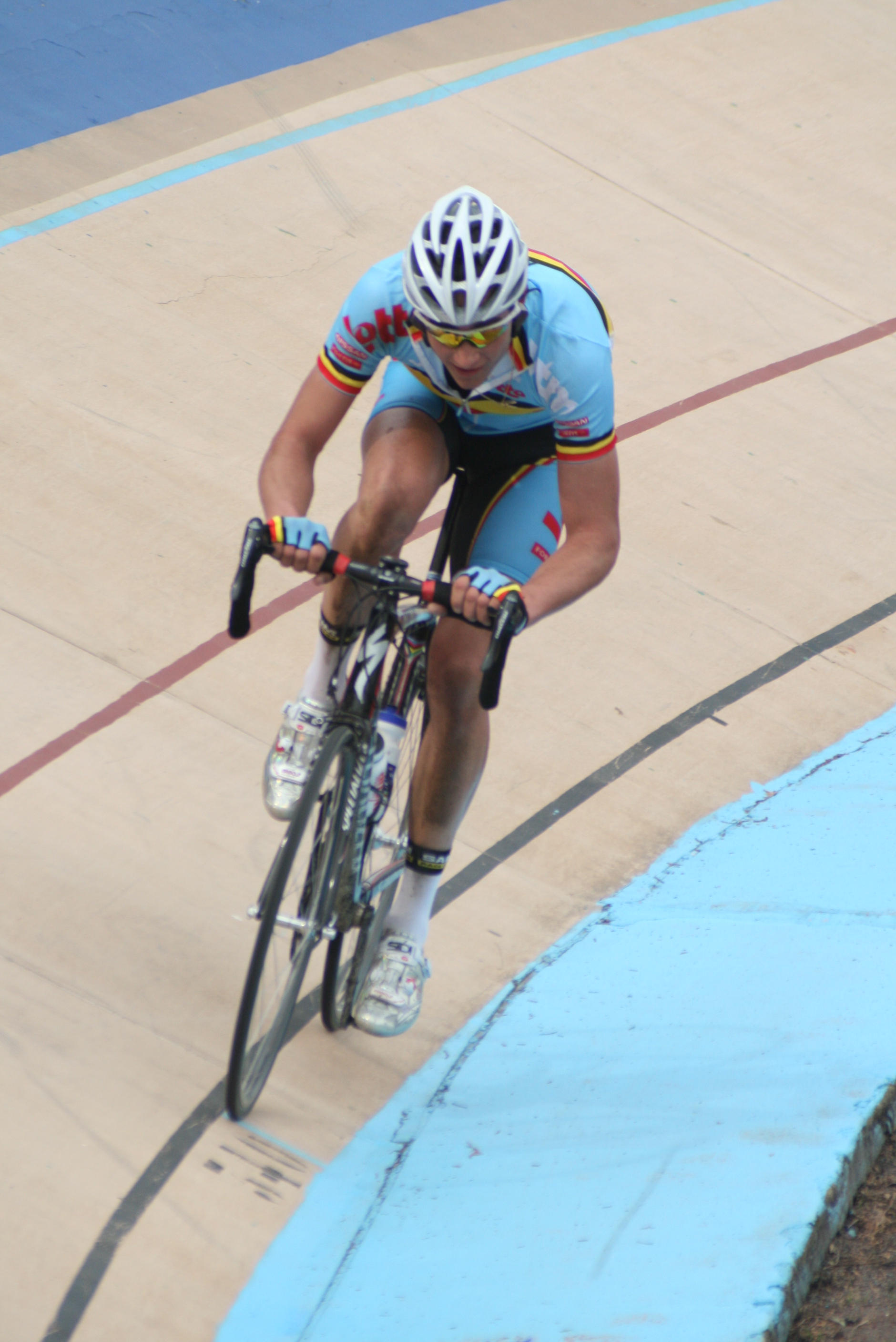
Guillaume Van Keirsbulck winning in 2009

Year	Country	Rider	Team
2003	France	Anthony Colin	
2004	Great Britain	Geraint Thomas	
2005	Switzerland	Michael Bär	
2006	Netherlands	Raymond Kreder	
2007	France	Fabien Taillefer	
2008	Great Britain	Andrew Fenn	
2009	Belgium	Guillaume Van Keirsbulck	
2010	Belgium	Jasper Stuyven	
2011	France	Florian Sénéchal	
2012	Denmark	Mads Würtz Schmidt	
2013	Denmark	Mads Pedersen	
2014	Denmark	Magnus Bak Klaris	
2015	Netherlands	Bram Welten	
2016	Netherlands	Jarno Mobach	
2017	Great Britain	Tom Pidcock	Great Britain (national team)
2018	Great Britain	Lewis Askey	Great Britain (national team)
2019	Netherlands	Hidde van Veenendaal	
2020	No race due to COVID-19 pandemic		
2021	Norway	Stian Fredheim	Norway (national team)
2022	Luxembourg	Niels Michotte	AG2R Citroën U19 Team
2023	France	Matys Grisel	AG2R Citroën U19 Team
2024	Slovenia	Jakob Omrzel	Slovenian (national team)
2025	Netherlands	Michiel Mouris	Team GRENKE - Auto Eder
2026	Netherlands	Thijs Wiersma	Netherlands (national team)
