= Kenneth Vanbilsen =

Belgian bicycle racer

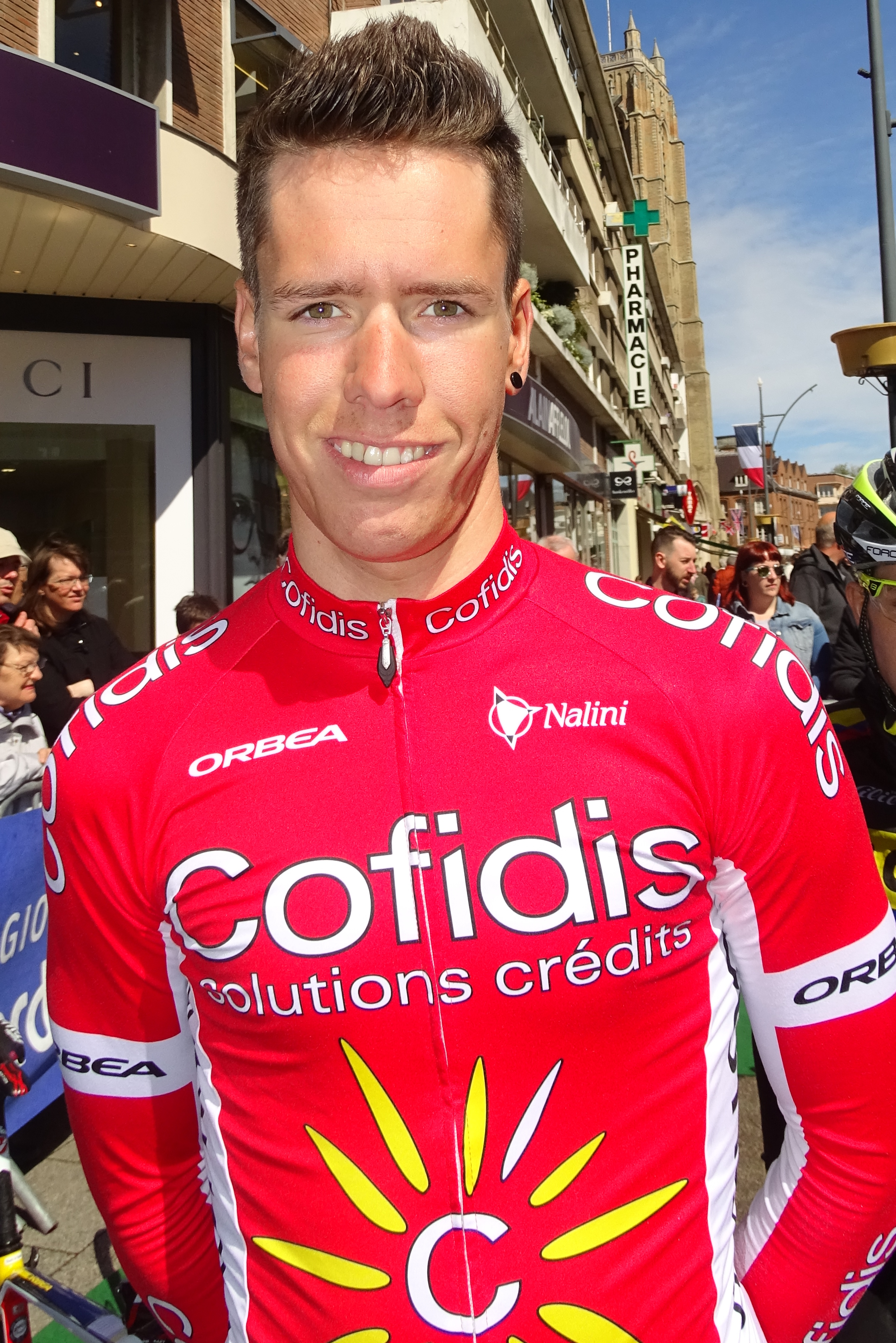
- Vanbilsen in 2015

Personal information
- Full name: Kenneth Vanbilsen
- Born: 1 June 1990 (age 36) Herk-de-Stad, Belgium
- Height: 1.84 m (6 ft 0 in)
- Weight: 73 kg (161 lb)

Cycling career
- Sport: Cycling
- Discipline: Road
- Role: Rider
- Rider type: Sprinter

Amateur team
- 2009–2010: Davo–Lotto–Davitamon

Professional teams
- 2011: Donckers Koffie–Jelly Belly
- 2012: An Post–Sean Kelly
- 2013–2014: Topsport Vlaanderen–Baloise
- 2015–2022: Cofidis

Kenneth Vanbilsen (born 1 June 1990 in Herk-de-Stad) is a Belgian former cyclist, who competed as a professional from 2011 to 2022. He was named in the start list for the 2015 Tour de France, winning the combativity award on stage ten.

== Major results ==
2008
1st Trofee der Vlaamse Ardennen
7th Paris–Roubaix Juniors
2011
Ronde van Vlaams-Brabant

1st Stages 2 & 5

3rd Flèche Ardennaise
9th Grote Prijs Jef Scherens
2012
1st Ronde van Vlaanderen Beloften
2nd Circuit de Wallonie
2nd Brustem Sint-Truiden
3rd ZLM Tour
3rd Jeuk–Gingelom
7th Memorial Rik Van Steenbergen
7th Ronde van Limburg
7th Kattekoers
8th Road race, UCI Under-23 Road World Championships
10th Nationale Sluitingsprijs
2013
1st Mountains classification Tour des Fjords
2nd Internationale Wielertrofee Jong Maar Moedig
3rd Druivenkoers Overijse
7th Overall Tour de l'Eurométropole
8th Gooikse Pijl
9th Dutch Food Valley Classic
2014
1st Grand Prix d'Ouverture La Marseillaise
1st Combativity classification Eneco Tour
2nd Classic Loire Atlantique
2nd Stadsprijs Geraardsbergen
5th Grote Prijs Jef Scherens
6th Grand Prix de la Somme
10th Overall Tour de Picardie
10th Ronde van Limburg
2015
2nd Grand Prix La Marseillaise
9th Overall Ster ZLM Toer
Combativity award Stage 10 Tour de France
2016
4th Classic Loire Atlantique
2017
1st Combativity classification Tour of Belgium
8th Polynormande
8th Dwars door het Hageland
2019
1st Dwars door het Hageland
2022
6th Scheldeprijs

=== Grand Tour general classification results timeline ===
| Grand Tour | 2015 | 2016 | 2017 | 2018 | 2019 |
|---|---|---|---|---|---|
| Giro d'Italia | Has not contested during his career | | | | |
| Tour de France | 158 | — | — | — | — |
| Vuelta a España | — | DNF | 146 | 137 | — |

Legend
| — | Did not compete |
| DNF | Did not finish |
