= Andrew Fenn =

British cyclist (born 1990)

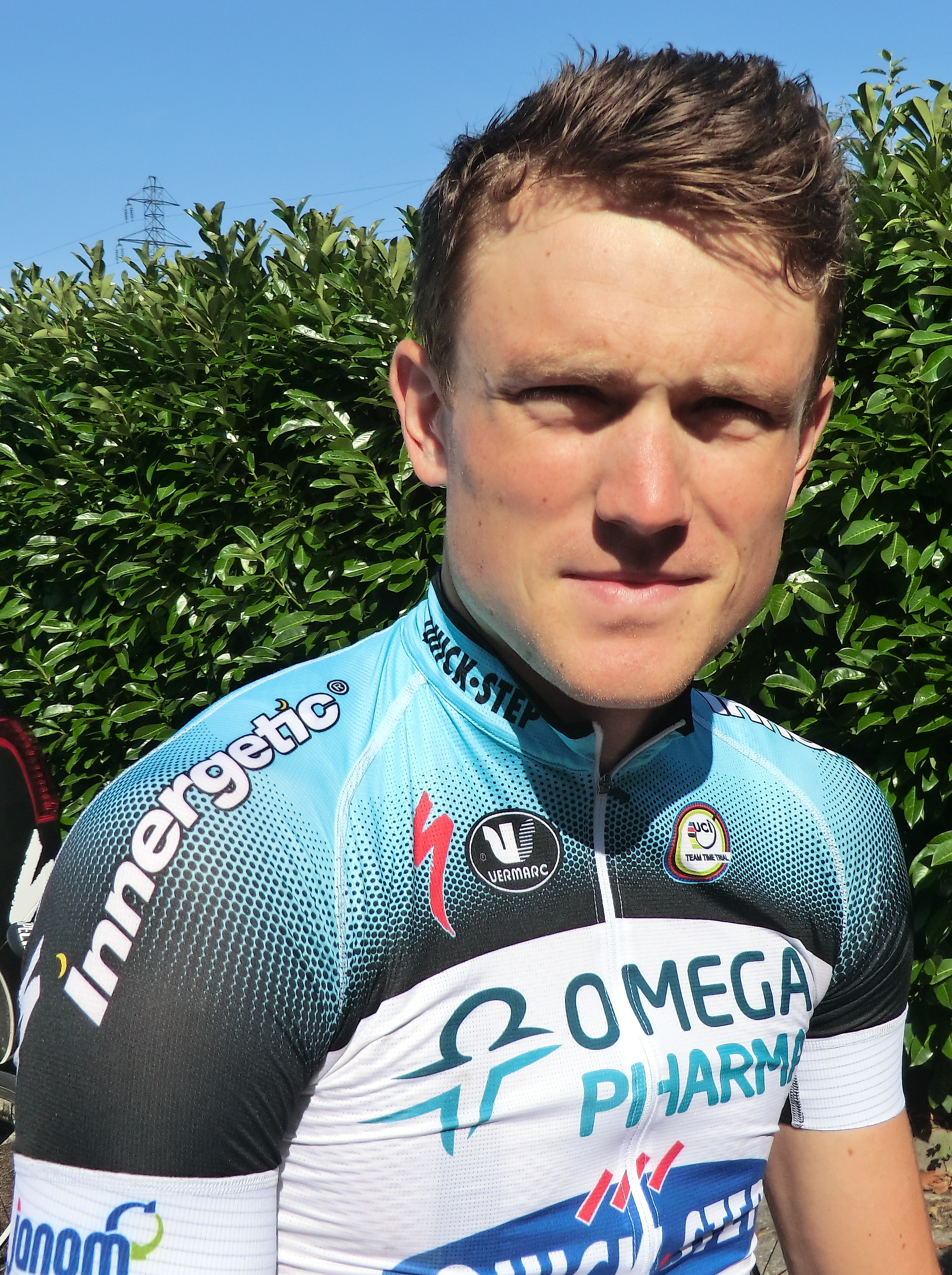
- Fenn in 2013

Personal information
- Full name: Andrew James Fenn
- Nickname: Andy
- Born: 1 July 1990 (age 36) Birmingham, England
- Height: 1.86 m (6 ft 1 in)
- Weight: 79 kg (174 lb; 12.4 st)

Cycling career
- Sport: Cycling
- Current team: Retired
- Disciplines: Road; Track
- Role: Rider
- Rider type: Sprinter

Amateur teams
- 2000–2005: Welwyn Wheelers
- 2007: Liverpool Mercury
- 2008: Dolan R.T./Dolan Bikes

Professional teams
- 2011: An Post–Sean Kelly
- 2012–2014: Omega Pharma–Quick-Step
- 2015–2016: Team Sky
- 2017–2018: Aqua Blue Sport
Medal record
Men's road bicycle racing
Representing Great Britain
World Championships
Bronze medal – third place	2011 Copenhagen	Under-23 road race

Andrew James Fenn (born 1 July 1990) is a British former professional cyclist, who rode professionally between 2011 and 2018 for four different teams. Fenn took four individual victories in elite road racing events and represented Scotland at the 2010 Commonwealth Games.

== Career ==
=== Junior and amateur years ===
Fenn competed in many sports as a child but concentrated on cycling from the age of 12 when he joined Welwyn Wheelers. His talent was noticed by British Cycling, and he joined their Olympic Development Programme in November 2006 and won the junior version of Paris–Roubaix in 2008, before moving on to the Olympic Academy Programme in 2009-2010.

At the 2010 Commonwealth Games, Birmingham-born Fenn – who was qualified to ride for Scotland as his mother was Scottish-born – finished 14th in the men's road time trial.

=== Turning professional ===
His first year riding as a professional was in 2011, in which he claimed two victories and the bronze medal in the under-23 road race at the Road World Championships.

In September 2014, it was announced that Fenn had signed for Team Sky, joining on 1 January 2015.

Fenn retired from cycling following the disbanding of the Aqua Blue Sport team at the end of the 2018 season.

== Major results ==
=== Road ===
2008
1st Paris–Roubaix Juniors
2nd Road race, National Junior Championships
2010
1st Road race, National Under-23 Road Championships
4th Overall Tour de Berlin
2011
1st Memorial Van Coningsloo
1st Stage 7 Tour de Bretagne
2nd Road race, National Under-23 Championships
3rd Road race, UCI World Under-23 Championships
4th Zellik–Galmaarden
5th Paris–Roubaix Espoirs
2012 (2 pro wins)
Vuelta a Mallorca

1st Trofeo Palma
1st Trofeo Migjorn

1st Stage 2 (TTT) Tour de l'Ain
4th Grand Prix Impanis-Van Petegem
6th Omloop van het Houtland
6th Münsterland Giro
2013
1st Gullegem Koerse
5th GP Briek Schotte
6th Overall Tour de Picardie
2014
1st GP Briek Schotte
5th Nokere Koerse
6th Brussels Cycling Classic
9th Overall Tour of Qatar
2015
7th London Nocturne
2016
3rd Road race, National Championships
7th Trofeo Felanitx–Ses Salines–Campos–Porreres
2018
5th Nokere Koerse

=== Track ===
2008
2nd Team pursuit, UEC European Junior Championships
2nd Madison, National Championships (with Jonathan Bellis)
National Junior Championships

2nd Individual pursuit
3rd Kilo

2009
2nd Team pursuit, UEC European Under-23 Championships
2nd Team pursuit, UCI World Cup Classics, Melbourne
3rd Madison, National Championships (with Alex Dowsett)
2011
3rd Team pursuit, UCI World Cup Classics, Beijing
