= 2014 Tour of Qatar =

Race details
- Dates: 9–14 February 2014
- Stages: 6
- Distance: 714.4 km (443.9 mi)
- Winning time: 15h 53' 37"

Results
Jersey awarded to the overall winner	Winner	Niki Terpstra (Netherlands)	(Omega Pharma–Quick-Step)
	Second	Tom Boonen (Belgium)	(Omega Pharma–Quick-Step)
	Third	Jürgen Roelandts (Belgium)	(Lotto–Belisol)
Jersey awarded to the points classification winner	Points	Tom Boonen (Belgium)	(Omega Pharma–Quick-Step)
Jersey awarded to the young rider classification winner	Young rider	Guillaume Van Keirsbulck (Belgium)	(Omega Pharma–Quick-Step)
	Team	Omega Pharma–Quick-Step	

The 2014 Tour of Qatar was the 13th edition of the Tour of Qatar cycling stage race. It was rated as a 2.HC event on the UCI Asia Tour, and was held between 9 and 14 February 2014, in Qatar.

The race was won by Omega Pharma–Quick-Step rider Niki Terpstra, who won the opening stage of the race and held the lead throughout. Second place went to his teammate Tom Boonen, who won two stages and the points classification, while third place went to Jürgen Roelandts of the Lotto–Belisol squad. The young rider classification was won by another Omega Pharma–Quick-Step rider, Guillaume Van Keirsbulck, while the teams classification was also won by Omega Pharma–Quick-Step, after five of the team's eight riders – Terpstra, Boonen, Van Keirsbulck (seventh), Stijn Vandenbergh (eighth) and Andrew Fenn (ninth) – finished in the top ten overall.

== Teams ==
Nineteen teams competed in the 2014 Tour of Qatar. These included thirteen UCI World Tour teams, five UCI Professional Continental teams and the Skydive Dubai Pro Cycling Team.

The teams that participated in the race were:

- Ag2r–La Mondiale
- Astana
- Belkin Pro Cycling
- BMC Racing Team
- Cannondale
- FDJ.fr
- Lotto–Belisol
- Omega Pharma–Quick-Step
- Orica–GreenEDGE
- Team Katusha
- Team Sky
- Tinkoff–Saxo
- Trek Factory Racing
- Bardiani–CSF
- IAM Cycling
- NetApp–Endura
- Topsport Vlaanderen–Baloise
- UnitedHealthcare
- Skydive Dubai Pro Cycling

== Race overview ==
Stage	Date	Course	Distance	Type	Winner
1	9 February	Al Wakra to Dukhan Beach	135.5 km (84.2 mi)	Flat stage	Niki Terpstra (NED)
2	10 February	Camel Race Track to Al Khor Corniche	160.5 km (99.7 mi)	Flat stage	Tom Boonen (BEL)
3	11 February	Lusail Circuit	10.9 km (6.8 mi)	Individual time trial	Michael Hepburn (AUS)
4	12 February	Dukhan Beach to Mesaieed	135 km (83.9 mi)	Flat stage	Tom Boonen (BEL)
5	13 February	Al Zubara Fort to Madinat ash Shamal	159 km (98.8 mi)	Flat stage	André Greipel (GER)
6	14 February	Sealine Beach Resort to Doha Corniche	113.5 km (70.5 mi)	Flat stage	Arnaud Démare (FRA)

== Stages ==
=== Stage 1 ===
9 February 2014 – Al Wakra to Dukhan Beach, 135.5 km (84.2 mi)

Stage 1 Result

	Rider	Team	Time
1	Niki Terpstra (NED)	Omega Pharma–Quick-Step	3h 13' 42"
2	Jürgen Roelandts (BEL)	Lotto–Belisol	+ 1"
3	Michael Schär (SUI)	BMC Racing Team	+ 1"
4	Martin Elmiger (SUI)	IAM Cycling	+ 1"
5	Guillaume Van Keirsbulck (BEL)	Omega Pharma–Quick-Step	+ 7"
6	Tom Boonen (BEL)	Omega Pharma–Quick-Step	+ 7"
7	Barry Markus (NED)	Belkin Pro Cycling	+ 7"
8	Arnaud Démare (FRA)	FDJ.fr	+ 7"
9	Michael Van Staeyen (BEL)	Topsport Vlaanderen–Baloise	+ 7"
10	Marcel Sieberg (GER)	Lotto–Belisol	+ 7"

General Classification after Stage 1

	Rider	Team	Time
1	Niki Terpstra (NED)	Omega Pharma–Quick-Step	3h 13' 26"
2	Jürgen Roelandts (BEL)	Lotto–Belisol	+ 9"
3	Michael Schär (SUI)	BMC Racing Team	+ 12"
4	Martin Elmiger (SUI)	IAM Cycling	+ 17"
5	Alexander Kristoff (NOR)	Team Katusha	+ 21"
6	Sam Bennett (IRL)	NetApp–Endura	+ 22"
7	Guillaume Van Keirsbulck (BEL)	Omega Pharma–Quick-Step	+ 23"
8	Tom Boonen (BEL)	Omega Pharma–Quick-Step	+ 23"
9	Barry Markus (NED)	Belkin Pro Cycling	+ 23"
10	Arnaud Démare (FRA)	FDJ.fr	+ 23"

=== Stage 2 ===
10 February 2014 – Camel Race Track to Al Khor Corniche, 160.5 km (99.7 mi)

Stage 2 Result

	Rider	Team	Time
1	Tom Boonen (BEL)	Omega Pharma–Quick-Step	3h 30' 07"
2	Michael Mørkøv (DEN)	Tinkoff–Saxo	s.t.
3	Jürgen Roelandts (BEL)	Lotto–Belisol	s.t.
4	Andrew Fenn (GBR)	Omega Pharma–Quick-Step	s.t.
5	Matti Breschel (DEN)	Tinkoff–Saxo	s.t.
6	Ian Stannard (GBR)	Team Sky	s.t.
7	Niki Terpstra (NED)	Omega Pharma–Quick-Step	s.t.
8	Marcel Sieberg (GER)	Lotto–Belisol	s.t.
9	Lars Boom (NED)	Belkin Pro Cycling	+ 5"
10	Karsten Kroon (NED)	Tinkoff–Saxo	+ 5"

General Classification after Stage 2

	Rider	Team	Time
1	Niki Terpstra (NED)	Omega Pharma–Quick-Step	6h 43' 30"
2	Jürgen Roelandts (BEL)	Lotto–Belisol	+ 5"
3	Tom Boonen (BEL)	Omega Pharma–Quick-Step	+ 14"
4	Michael Mørkøv (DEN)	Tinkoff–Saxo	+ 20"
5	Marcel Sieberg (GER)	Lotto–Belisol	+ 26"
6	Andrew Fenn (GBR)	Omega Pharma–Quick-Step	+ 26"
7	Ian Stannard (GBR)	Team Sky	+ 26"
8	Matti Breschel (DEN)	Tinkoff–Saxo	+ 26"
9	Lars Boom (NED)	Belkin Pro Cycling	+ 31"
10	Karsten Kroon (NED)	Tinkoff–Saxo	+ 31"

=== Stage 3 ===
11 February 2014 – Lusail Circuit, 10.9 km (6.8 mi), individual time trial (ITT)

Stage 3 Result

	Rider	Team	Time
1	Michael Hepburn (AUS)	Orica–GreenEDGE	13' 28"
2	Lars Boom (NED)	Belkin Pro Cycling	+ 1"
3	Daniele Bennati (ITA)	Tinkoff–Saxo	+ 6"
4	Fabian Cancellara (SUI)	Trek Factory Racing	+ 6"
5	Niki Terpstra (NED)	Omega Pharma–Quick-Step	+ 8"
6	Martin Elmiger (SUI)	IAM Cycling	+ 10"
7	Guillaume Van Keirsbulck (BEL)	Omega Pharma–Quick-Step	+ 13"
8	Philippe Gilbert (BEL)	BMC Racing Team	+ 15"
9	Jens Mouris (NED)	Orica–GreenEDGE	+ 16"
10	Gert Steegmans (BEL)	Omega Pharma–Quick-Step	+ 17"

General Classification after Stage 3

	Rider	Team	Time
1	Niki Terpstra (NED)	Omega Pharma–Quick-Step	6h 57' 06"
2	Jürgen Roelandts (BEL)	Lotto–Belisol	+ 21"
3	Lars Boom (NED)	Belkin Pro Cycling	+ 24"
4	Tom Boonen (BEL)	Omega Pharma–Quick-Step	+ 28"
5	Ian Stannard (GBR)	Team Sky	+ 35"
6	Guillaume Van Keirsbulck (BEL)	Omega Pharma–Quick-Step	+ 45"
7	Michael Mørkøv (DEN)	Tinkoff–Saxo	+ 49"
8	Marcel Sieberg (GER)	Lotto–Belisol	+ 49"
9	Stijn Vandenbergh (BEL)	Omega Pharma–Quick-Step	+ 58"
10	Andrew Fenn (GBR)	Omega Pharma–Quick-Step	+ 1' 06"

=== Stage 4 ===
12 February 2014 – Dukhan Beach to Mesaieed, 135 km (83.9 mi)

Stage 4 Result

	Rider	Team	Time
1	Tom Boonen (BEL)	Omega Pharma–Quick-Step	2h 22' 34"
2	André Greipel (GER)	Lotto–Belisol	s.t.
3	Barry Markus (NED)	Belkin Pro Cycling	s.t.
4	Aidis Kruopis (LTU)	Orica–GreenEDGE	s.t.
5	Sam Bennett (IRL)	NetApp–Endura	s.t.
6	Jacopo Guarnieri (ITA)	Astana	s.t.
7	Arnaud Démare (FRA)	FDJ.fr	s.t.
8	Matteo Pelucchi (ITA)	IAM Cycling	s.t.
9	Michael Van Staeyen (BEL)	Topsport Vlaanderen–Baloise	s.t.
10	Bernhard Eisel (AUT)	Team Sky	s.t.

General Classification after Stage 4

	Rider	Team	Time
1	Niki Terpstra (NED)	Omega Pharma–Quick-Step	9h 19' 38"
2	Tom Boonen (BEL)	Omega Pharma–Quick-Step	+ 17"
3	Jürgen Roelandts (BEL)	Lotto–Belisol	+ 20"
4	Ian Stannard (GBR)	Team Sky	+ 37"
5	Guillaume Van Keirsbulck (BEL)	Omega Pharma–Quick-Step	+ 47"
6	Michael Mørkøv (DEN)	Tinkoff–Saxo	+ 48"
7	Marcel Sieberg (GER)	Lotto–Belisol	+ 51"
8	Stijn Vandenbergh (BEL)	Omega Pharma–Quick-Step	+ 1' 00"
9	Andrew Fenn (GBR)	Omega Pharma–Quick-Step	+ 1' 08"
10	Karsten Kroon (NED)	Tinkoff–Saxo	+ 1' 21"

=== Stage 5 ===
13 February 2014 – Al Zubara Fort to Madinat ash Shamal, 159 km (98.8 mi)

Stage 5 Result

	Rider	Team	Time
1	André Greipel (GER)	Lotto–Belisol	3h 48' 53"
2	Aidis Kruopis (LTU)	Orica–GreenEDGE	s.t.
3	Theo Bos (NED)	Belkin Pro Cycling	s.t.
4	Daniele Bennati (ITA)	Tinkoff–Saxo	s.t.
5	Matteo Pelucchi (ITA)	IAM Cycling	s.t.
6	Jürgen Roelandts (BEL)	Lotto–Belisol	s.t.
7	Sam Bennett (IRL)	NetApp–Endura	s.t.
8	Tom Boonen (BEL)	Omega Pharma–Quick-Step	s.t.
9	Niki Terpstra (NED)	Omega Pharma–Quick-Step	s.t.
10	Elia Viviani (ITA)	Cannondale	s.t.

General Classification after Stage 5

	Rider	Team	Time
1	Niki Terpstra (NED)	Omega Pharma–Quick-Step	13h 08' 31"
2	Tom Boonen (BEL)	Omega Pharma–Quick-Step	+ 17"
3	Jürgen Roelandts (BEL)	Lotto–Belisol	+ 20"
4	Ian Stannard (GBR)	Team Sky	+ 37"
5	Michael Mørkøv (DEN)	Tinkoff–Saxo	+ 48"
6	Marcel Sieberg (GER)	Lotto–Belisol	+ 56"
7	Guillaume Van Keirsbulck (BEL)	Omega Pharma–Quick-Step	+ 57"
8	Stijn Vandenbergh (BEL)	Omega Pharma–Quick-Step	+ 1' 05"
9	Andrew Fenn (GBR)	Omega Pharma–Quick-Step	+ 1' 18"
10	André Greipel (GER)	Lotto–Belisol	+ 1' 23"

=== Stage 6 ===
14 February 2014 – Sealine Beach Resort to Doha Corniche, 113.5 km (70.5 mi)

Stage 6 Result

	Rider	Team	Time
1	Arnaud Démare (FRA)	FDJ.fr	2h 45' 06"
2	Daniele Bennati (ITA)	Tinkoff–Saxo	s.t.
3	Bernhard Eisel (AUT)	Team Sky	s.t.
4	Tom Boonen (BEL)	Omega Pharma–Quick-Step	s.t.
5	Lucas Sebastián Haedo (ARG)	Skydive Dubai Pro Cycling	s.t.
6	Silvan Dillier (SUI)	BMC Racing Team	s.t.
7	Andrea Guardini (ITA)	Astana	s.t.
8	Sam Bennett (IRL)	NetApp–Endura	s.t.
9	Sebastian Lander (DEN)	BMC Racing Team	s.t.
10	Nicola Ruffoni (ITA)	Bardiani–CSF	s.t.

Final General Classification

	Rider	Team	Time
1	Niki Terpstra (NED)	Omega Pharma–Quick-Step	15h 53' 37"
2	Tom Boonen (BEL)	Omega Pharma–Quick-Step	+ 17"
3	Jürgen Roelandts (BEL)	Lotto–Belisol	+ 20"
4	Ian Stannard (GBR)	Team Sky	+ 37"
5	Michael Mørkøv (DEN)	Tinkoff–Saxo	+ 48"
6	Marcel Sieberg (GER)	Lotto–Belisol	+ 56"
7	Guillaume Van Keirsbulck (BEL)	Omega Pharma–Quick-Step	+ 57"
8	Stijn Vandenbergh (BEL)	Omega Pharma–Quick-Step	+ 1' 05"
9	Andrew Fenn (GBR)	Omega Pharma–Quick-Step	+ 1' 18"
10	André Greipel (GER)	Lotto–Belisol	+ 1' 23"

== Classification leadership table ==
Stage	Winner	General classification	Points classification	Young rider classification	Teams classification
1	Niki Terpstra	Niki Terpstra	Niki Terpstra	Sam Bennett	Omega Pharma–Quick-Step
2	Tom Boonen	Niki Terpstra	Niki Terpstra	Andrew Fenn	Omega Pharma–Quick-Step
3	Michael Hepburn	Niki Terpstra	Niki Terpstra	Guillaume Van Keirsbulck	Omega Pharma–Quick-Step
4	Tom Boonen	Niki Terpstra	Tom Boonen	Guillaume Van Keirsbulck	Omega Pharma–Quick-Step
5	André Greipel	Niki Terpstra	Tom Boonen	Guillaume Van Keirsbulck	Omega Pharma–Quick-Step
6	Arnaud Démare	Niki Terpstra	Tom Boonen	Guillaume Van Keirsbulck	Omega Pharma–Quick-Step
Final		Niki Terpstra	Tom Boonen	Guillaume Van Keirsbulck	Omega Pharma–Quick-Step
