= 2014 Three Days of De Panne =

2014 UCI Europe Tour

Race details
- Dates: 1–3 April
- Stages: 4
- Distance: 531 km (330 mi)
- Winning time: 11h 38' 16"

Results
Jersey awarded to the overall winner	Winner	Guillaume Van Keirsbulck (BEL)	(Omega Pharma–Quick-Step)
	Second	Luke Durbridge (AUS)	(Orica–GreenEDGE)
	Third	Gert Steegmans (BEL)	(Omega Pharma–Quick-Step)
Jersey awarded to the points classification winner	Points	Sacha Modolo (ITA)	(Lampre–Merida)
Jersey awarded to the mountains classification winner	Mountains	Tim De Troyer (BEL)	(Wanty–Groupe Gobert)
Jersey awarded to the sprints classification winner	Sprints	Stijn Steels (BEL)	(Topsport Vlaanderen–Baloise)
	Team	Omega Pharma–Quick-Step	

The 2014 Three Days of De Panne (Dutch: 2014 VDK-Driedaagse De Panne-Koksijde) was the 38th edition of the Three Days of De Panne, an annual bicycle stage race. The race was held in and around the De Panne region of West Flanders. It began in De Panne on 1 April and finished in De Panne on 3 April. As the previous editions, the race consisted of four stages, with two held on the final day. It was part of the 2014 UCI Europe Tour and was rated as a 2.HC event.

== Race overview ==
Stage	Date	Course	Distance	Type	Winner	Ref
1	1 April	De Panne to Zottegem	201 km (125 mi)	Medium-mountain stage	Peter Sagan (SVK)	
2	2 April	Zottegem to Koksijde (Oostduinkerke)	206 km (128 mi)	Hilly stage	Sacha Modolo (ITA)	
3a	3 April	De Panne to De Panne	109.7 km (68 mi)	Flat stage	Sacha Modolo (ITA)	
3b	3 April	De Panne to Koksijde to De Panne	14.3 km (9 mi)	Individual time trial	Maciej Bodnar (POL)	
Total		531 km (329.9 mi)				

== Teams ==
A total of 22 teams took part in the race:

ProTeams

- Astana
- Cannondale
- Team Europcar
- FDJ.fr
- Giant–Shimano
- Team Katusha
- Lampre–Merida
- Lotto–Belisol
- Omega Pharma–Quick-Step
- Orica–GreenEDGE

Professional Continental Teams

- Androni Giocattoli–Venezuela
- Bardiani–CSF
- Caja Rural–Seguros RGA
- MTN–Qhubeka
- Neri Sottoli
- NetApp–Endura
- Topsport Vlaanderen–Baloise
- UnitedHealthcare
- Wanty–Groupe Gobert

Continental Teams

- Team 3M
- Vastgoedservice–Golden Palace
- Veranclassic-Doltcini

== Stages ==
=== Stage 1 ===
1 April 2014 – De Panne to Zottegem, 201 km (125 mi)

Stage 1 result

	Rider	Team	Time
1	Peter Sagan (SVK)	Cannondale	4h 29' 39"
2	Oscar Gatto (ITA)	Cannondale	s.t.
3	Kenneth Vanbilsen (BEL)	Topsport Vlaanderen–Baloise	s.t.
4	Gert Steegmans (BEL)	Omega Pharma–Quick-Step	s.t.
5	Laurens De Vreese (BEL)	Wanty–Groupe Gobert	s.t.
6	Mauro Finetto (ITA)	Neri Sottoli	s.t.
7	Vincent Jérôme (FRA)	Team Europcar	s.t.
8	Niki Terpstra (NED)	Omega Pharma–Quick-Step	s.t.
9	Jérôme Baugnies (BEL)	Wanty–Groupe Gobert	s.t.
10	Sander Cordeel (BEL)	Vastgoedservice–Golden Palace	s.t.

General Classification after Stage 1

	Rider	Team	Time
1	Peter Sagan (SVK)	Cannondale	4h 29' 29"
2	Oscar Gatto (ITA)	Cannondale	+ 4"
3	Kenneth Vanbilsen (BEL)	Topsport Vlaanderen–Baloise	+ 6"
4	Gert Steegmans (BEL)	Omega Pharma–Quick-Step	+ 7"
5	Laurens De Vreese (BEL)	Wanty–Groupe Gobert	+ 10"
6	Mauro Finetto (ITA)	Neri Sottoli	+ 10"
7	Vincent Jérôme (FRA)	Team Europcar	+ 10"
8	Niki Terpstra (NED)	Omega Pharma–Quick-Step	+ 10"
9	Jérôme Baugnies (BEL)	Wanty–Groupe Gobert	+ 10"
10	Sander Cordeel (BEL)	Vastgoedservice–Golden Palace	+ 10"

=== Stage 2 ===
2 April 2014 – Zottegem to Koksijde–Oostduinkerke, 206 km (128 mi)

Stage 2 result

	Rider	Team	Time
1	Sacha Modolo (ITA)	Lampre–Merida	4h 28' 15"
2	Arnaud Démare (FRA)	FDJ.fr	s.t.
3	Alexander Kristoff (NOR)	Team Katusha	s.t.
4	Ruslan Tleubayev (KAZ)	Astana	s.t.
5	Danilo Napolitano (ITA)	Wanty–Groupe Gobert	s.t.
6	Daniele Colli (ITA)	Neri Sottoli	s.t.
7	Alessandro Bazzana (ITA)	UnitedHealthcare	s.t.
8	Marcel Kittel (GER)	Giant–Shimano	s.t.
9	Kenneth Vanbilsen (BEL)	Topsport Vlaanderen–Baloise	s.t.
10	Marco Canola (ITA)	Bardiani–CSF	s.t.

General Classification after Stage 2

	Rider	Team	Time
1	Gert Steegmans (BEL)	Omega Pharma–Quick-Step	8h 57' 45"
2	Oscar Gatto (ITA)	Cannondale	+ 1"
3	Kenneth Vanbilsen (BEL)	Topsport Vlaanderen–Baloise	+ 3"
4	Niki Terpstra (NED)	Omega Pharma–Quick-Step	+ 5"
5	Mauro Finetto (ITA)	Neri Sottoli	+ 9"
6	Vincent Jérôme (FRA)	Team Europcar	+ 9"
7	Guillaume Van Keirsbulck (BEL)	Omega Pharma–Quick-Step	+ 9"
8	Arnaud Démare (FRA)	FDJ.fr	+ 14"
9	Luke Durbridge (AUS)	Orica–GreenEDGE	+ 20"
10	Alexander Kristoff (NOR)	Team Katusha	+ 24"

=== Stage 3a ===
3 April 2014 – De Panne to De Panne, 109.7 km (68.2 mi)

Stage 3a Result

	Rider	Team	Time
1	Sacha Modolo (ITA)	Lampre–Merida	2h 22' 20"
2	Andrea Guardini (ITA)	Astana	s.t.
3	Kenny van Hummel (NED)	Androni Giocattoli–Venezuela	s.t.
4	Kenneth Vanbilsen (BEL)	Topsport Vlaanderen–Baloise	s.t.
5	Ralf Matzka (GER)	NetApp–Endura	s.t.
6	Michael Van Staeyen (BEL)	Topsport Vlaanderen–Baloise	s.t.
7	Nicola Ruffoni (ITA)	Bardiani–CSF	s.t.
8	Alexander Kristoff (NOR)	Team Katusha	s.t.
9	Francesco Chicchi (ITA)	Neri Sottoli	s.t.
10	Youcef Reguigui (ALG)	MTN–Qhubeka	s.t.

General Classification after Stage 3a

	Rider	Team	Time
1	Gert Steegmans (BEL)	Omega Pharma–Quick-Step	11h 20' 05"
2	Kenneth Vanbilsen (BEL)	Topsport Vlaanderen–Baloise	+ 3"
3	Niki Terpstra (NED)	Omega Pharma–Quick-Step	+ 5"
4	Mauro Finetto (ITA)	Neri Sottoli	+ 9"
5	Vincent Jérôme (FRA)	Team Europcar	+ 9"
6	Guillaume Van Keirsbulck (BEL)	Omega Pharma–Quick-Step	+ 9"
7	Luke Durbridge (AUS)	Orica–GreenEDGE	+ 20"
8	Alexander Kristoff (NOR)	Team Katusha	+ 24"
9	Sacha Modolo (ITA)	Lampre–Merida	+ 25"
10	Yves Lampaert (BEL)	Topsport Vlaanderen–Baloise	+ 26"

=== Stage 3b ===
3 April 2014 – De Panne to Koksijde to De Panne, 14.3 km (8.9 mi), individual time trial (ITT)

Stage 3b Result

	Rider	Team	Time
1	Maciej Bodnar (POL)	Cannondale	17' 51"
2	Jan Bárta (CZE)	NetApp–Endura	+ 3"
3	David Boucher (BEL)	FDJ.fr	+ 6"
4	Luke Durbridge (AUS)	Orica–GreenEDGE	+ 7"
5	Guillaume Van Keirsbulck (BEL)	Omega Pharma–Quick-Step	+ 11"
6	Marcel Kittel (GER)	Giant–Shimano	+ 13"
7	Kristijan Koren (SLO)	Cannondale	+ 14"
8	Johan Le Bon (FRA)	FDJ.fr	+ 16"
9	Sander Cordeel (BEL)	Vastgoedservice–Golden Palace	+ 16"
10	Rob Ruijgh (NED)	Vastgoedservice–Golden Palace	+ 25"

Final General Classification

	Rider	Team	Time
1	Guillaume Van Keirsbulck (BEL)	Omega Pharma–Quick-Step	11h 38' 16"
2	Luke Durbridge (AUS)	Orica–GreenEDGE	+ 7"
3	Gert Steegmans (BEL)	Omega Pharma–Quick-Step	+ 8"
4	Niki Terpstra (NED)	Omega Pharma–Quick-Step	+ 15"
5	Marcel Kittel (GER)	Giant–Shimano	+ 21"
6	Vincent Jérôme (FRA)	Team Europcar	+ 25"
7	Mauro Finetto (ITA)	Neri Sottoli	+ 27"
8	Alexander Kristoff (NOR)	Team Katusha	+ 32"
9	Rob Ruijgh (NED)	Vastgoedservice–Golden Palace	+ 33"
10	Alexander Porsev (RUS)	Team Katusha	+ 33"

== Classification leadership table ==
Stage	Winner	General classification	Points classification	Mountains classification	Sprints classification	Team classification	Combativity award
1	Peter Sagan	Peter Sagan	Peter Sagan	Tim De Troyer	Stijn Steels	Omega Pharma–Quick-Step	Tim De Troyer
2	Sacha Modolo	Gert Steegmans	Kenneth Vanbilsen	Tim De Troyer	Gert Steegmans	Omega Pharma–Quick-Step	Gert Steegmans
3a	Sacha Modolo	Gert Steegmans	Sacha Modolo	Tim De Troyer	Stijn Steels	Omega Pharma–Quick-Step	Stijn Steels
3b	Maciej Bodnar	Guillaume Van Keirsbulck	Sacha Modolo	Tim De Troyer	Stijn Steels	Omega Pharma–Quick-Step	not awarded
Final		Guillaume Van Keirsbulck	Sacha Modolo	Tim De Troyer	Stijn Steels	Omega Pharma–Quick-Step	Stijn Steels
