= Guillaume Van Keirsbulck =

Belgian racing cyclist

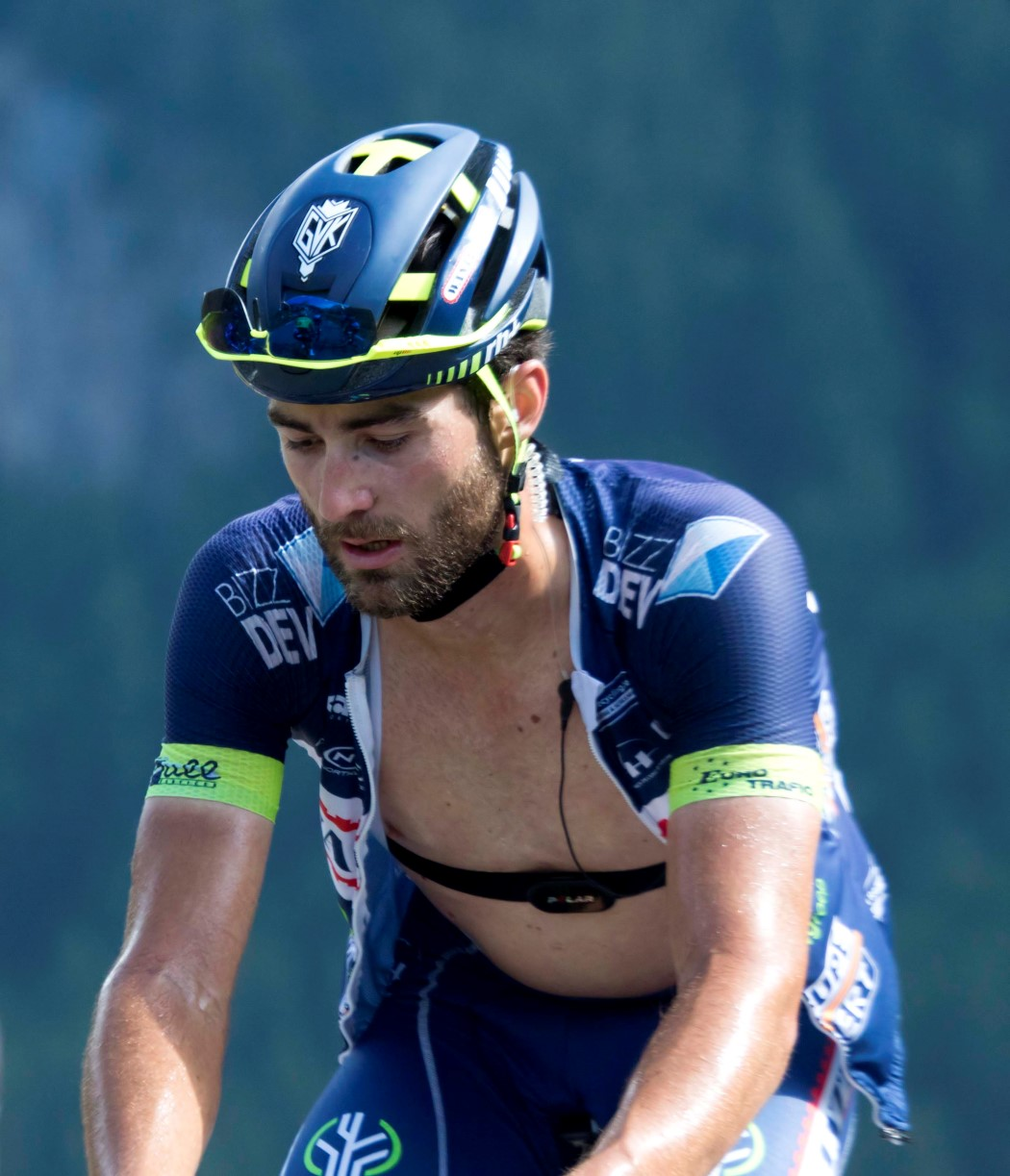
- Van Keirsbulck at the 2017 Tour de France

Personal information
- Full name: Guillaume Van Keirsbulck
- Nickname: Julio
- Born: 14 February 1991 (age 35) Roeselare, Belgium
- Height: 1.92 m (6 ft 3 1/2 in)
- Weight: 85 kg (187 lb; 13 st 5 lb)

Cycling career
- Sport: Cycling
- Current team: Retired
- Discipline: Road
- Role: Rider
- Rider type: Classics specialist

Amateur teams
- 2010: Beveren 2000
- 2010: Quick-Step (stagiaire)

Professional teams
- 2011–2016: Quick-Step
- 2017–2018: Wanty–Groupe Gobert
- 2019–2020: CCC Team
- 2021: Alpecin–Fenix Development Team
- 2022: Alpecin–Fenix
- 2023: Bingoal WB

Major wins
- Stage races Three Days of De Panne (2014)

Guillaume Van Keirsbulck (born 14 February 1991) is a Belgian former professional road bicycle racer, who competed as a professional from 2011 to 2023.

== Career ==
Born in Roeselare, Van Keirsbulck is the grandson of Benoni Beheyt and got his first major win in 2011 when winning the Omloop van het Houtland. In June 2017, he was named in the startlist for the 2017 Tour de France.

== Major results ==
2008
8th Time trial, UEC European Junior Road Championships
2009
1st Paris–Roubaix Juniors
6th Overall Internationale Junioren-rundfahrt Niedersachsen

1st Stage 2 (ITT)

2010
3rd Time trial, National Under-23 Road Championships
2011
1st Omloop van het Houtland
1st GP Briek Schotte
3rd Grote Prijs Jef Scherens
4th Le Samyn
7th Halle–Ingooigem
2012
4th Overall Tour de l'Eurométropole

1st Young rider classification

2013
1st Stage 1 (TTT) Tirreno–Adriatico
6th Gullegem Koerse
8th Heistse Pijl
9th Overall Three Days of De Panne
2014
1st Overall Three Days of De Panne
1st Stage 7 Eneco Tour
2nd Overall Driedaagse van West-Vlaanderen

1st Young rider classification
1st Stage 2

7th Overall Tour of Qatar

1st Young rider classification

7th Kuurne–Brussels–Kuurne
2015
5th Dwars door Vlaanderen
8th Ronde van Zeeland Seaports
2017
1st Le Samyn
5th Dwars door West-Vlaanderen
7th Grote Prijs Marcel Kint
10th De Kustpijl
Combativity award Stage 4 Tour de France
2018
1st Antwerp Port Epic
6th Dwars door West–Vlaanderen

=== Grand Tour general classification results timeline ===
Grand Tour	2013	2014	2015	2016	2017	2018	2019	2020	2021	2022
Giro d'Italia	Has not contested during his career									
Tour de France	—	—	—	—	147	123	—	—	—	123
Vuelta a España	125	—	—	—	—	—	—	—	—	—

Legend
—	Did not compete
DNF	Did not finish
