= Gert Steegmans =

Belgian cyclist

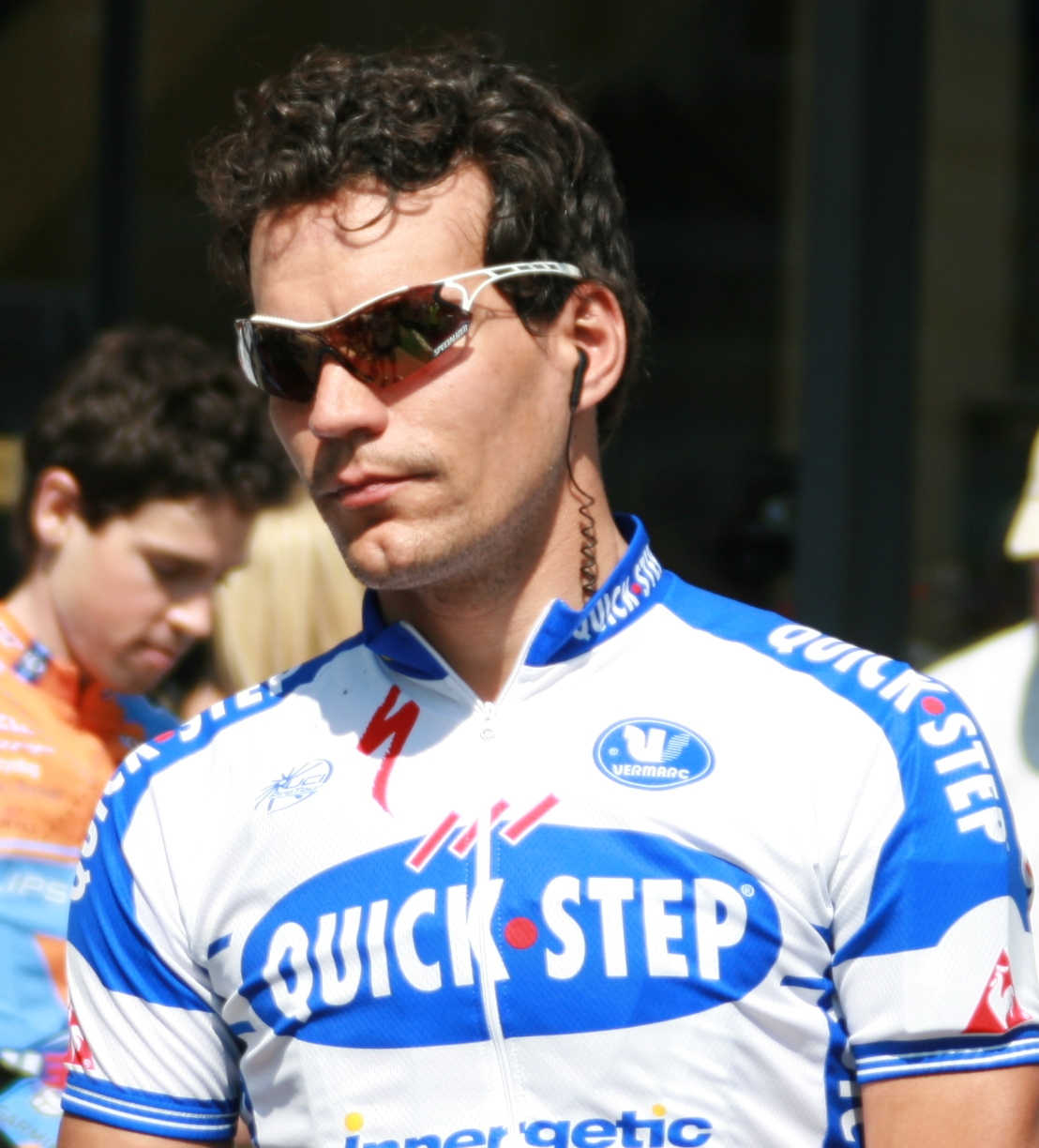
- Steegmans at the 2008 Four Days of Dunkirk.

Personal information
- Full name: Gert Steegmans
- Nickname: Steggels
- Born: 30 September 1980 (age 46) Hasselt, Belgium
- Height: 1.90 m (6 ft 3 in)
- Weight: 82 kg (181 lb)

Cycling career
- Sport: Cycling
- Current team: Retired
- Discipline: Road
- Role: Rider
- Rider type: Sprinter

Amateur teams
- 2000: Mapei–Latexco
- 2001: Domo–Farm Frites (stagiaire)
- 2002: Domo-Latexco

Professional teams
- 2003–2006: Lotto–Domo
- 2007–2008: Quick-Step–Innergetic
- 2009: Team Katusha
- 2010: Team RadioShack
- 2011–2014: Quick-Step
- 2015: Trek Factory Racing

Major wins
- Grand Tours Tour de France 2 individual stages (2007, 2008)

Gert Steegmans (born 30 September 1980 in Hasselt) is a Belgian former professional road bicycle racer who last rode for UCI ProTeam Lidl–Trek. He was noted for a strong finishing sprint and could compete in the sprint with fellow Belgian cyclist, and teammate, Tom Boonen.

== Career overview ==
Although Steegmans was already known in Belgium, he gained more popularity outside Belgium as he piloted Robbie McEwen to two stage wins during the 2006 Tour de France.

During the second stage of the 2007 Tour de France, a Liquigas rider fell sideways in the last 3 kilometres causing others to fall. Around 20 riders fell blocking the entire road and leaving approximately 30 riders to sprint for the victory, eventually taken by Steegmans in his home country ahead of his compatriot and teammate Tom Boonen, who took over the green jersey by coming second in the stage.

On 6 July 2008, it was announced Steegmans signed a two-year contract with Tinkoff Credit Systems. In the Tour de France, he won the prestigious stage at Champs-Élysées. Team Tinkoff later folded under that name, and the management and ridership re-emerged as Team Katusha.

Steegmans made headlines in the weeks leading up to the 2009 Tour de France with his refusal to sign an anti-doping agreement which Team Katusha was trying to get all its riders to sign. The agreement called for any rider who tested positive for a doping substance to pay a fine of five times their annual salary. Steegmans persisted in his refusal even after an ultimatum handed down by the team, which resulted in his not being selected for Katusha's Tour de France squad. Katusha and Steegmans dissolved his contract on 5 August after Steegmans' continuing refusal to sign the anti-doping charter. Team RadioShack announced that he would be joining the team in 2010 starting with the Tour Down Under in late January.

On 7 March 2010, during the time-trial for the Paris–Nice race, he was injured in a whirlwind accident, breaking a collarbone.

In December 2014 Steegmans was announced as a member of Lidl–Trek for the 2015 season. After struggling with injuries, he announced his immediate retirement in July 2015.

== Personal ==
Steegmans is married to former runway model and Tour de France podium girl Laura Leturgie, and they have one child, daughter Maélya (born on 6 June 2011).

== Major results ==
1996
1st Road race, National Under-17 Championships
1998
1st Time trial, National Under-19 Championships
2000
4th GP Wielerrevue
7th Hasselt–Spa–Hasselt
2002
1st Time trial, National Under-23 Championships
1st Zesbergenprijs Harelbeke
8th Hasselt–Spa–Hasselt
2003
8th Rund um den Flughafen Köln/Bonn
2004
5th Grote Prijs Jef Scherens
2005
1st Nationale Sluitingsprijs
1st Stage 1 Tour de Picardie
6th Overall Circuit Franco-Belge
2006
1st Stage 2 Tour de Picardie
1st Stage 3 Four Days of Dunkirk
2nd Overall Volta ao Algarve

1st Stages 3 & 4

3rd Scheldeprijs
5th Overall Tour of Belgium

1st Stage 5

6th Doha GP
6th Omloop Het Volk
6th Kuurne–Brussels–Kuurne
2007
1st Overall Circuit Franco-Belge

1st Stages 2 & 4

1st Tour de Rijke
1st Stage 2 Tour de France
1st Stage 1 Volta ao Algarve
1st Stage 3 Three Days of De Panne
1st Stage 4 Four Days of Dunkirk
1st Stage 1 (TTT) Tour of Qatar
3rd Scheldeprijs
5th Kuurne–Brussels–Kuurne
2008
Paris–Nice

1st Stages 1 & 2

1st Stage 21 Tour de France
1st Stage 2 Four Days of Dunkirk
1st Memorial Rik Van Steenbergen
1st Trofeo Calvià
1st Profronde van Friesland
1st Halle–Ingooigem
2nd Paris–Brussels
3rd Trofeo Cala Millor
4th Trofeo Mallorca
2009
1st Stage 2 Vuelta a Andalucía
1st Trofeo Mallorca
2010
3rd Paris–Tours
4th Binche–Tournai–Binche
8th Kampioenschap van Vlaanderen
9th Overall Circuit Franco-Belge
2011
1st Nokere Koerse
10th Overall Tour of Qatar
2012
4th Overall Tour of Qatar
2014
3rd Overall Three Days of De Panne
4th Nokere Koerse
