= 2012 Critérium International =

2012 UCI Europe Tour

Race details
- Dates: 24–25 March
- Stages: 3
- Distance: 275 km (171 mi)
- Winning time: 7h 03' 43"

Results
| Jersey awarded to the overall winner | Winner | Cadel Evans (AUS) | (BMC Racing Team) |
| | Second | Pierrick Fédrigo (FRA) | (FDJ–BigMat) |
| | Third | Michael Rogers (AUS) | (Team Sky) |
| Jersey awarded to the points classification winner | Points | Cadel Evans (AUS) | (BMC Racing Team) |
| Jersey awarded to the mountains classification winner | Mountains | Matteo Montaguti (ITA) | (Ag2r–La Mondiale) |
| Jersey awarded to the young rider classification winner | Young rider | Cyril Gautier (FRA) | (Team Europcar) |
| Jersey awarded to the team classification winner | Team | Team Sky | |

The 2012 Critérium International, was the 81st running of the Critérium International cycling stage race.

== Schedule ==
| Stage | Date | Course | Distance | Type | Winner |
|---|---|---|---|---|---|
| 1 | 24 March | Porto-Vecchio – Porto-Vecchio | 89.5 km (56 mi) | Medium-mountain stage | Florian Vachon (FRA) |
| 2 | 24 March | Porto-Vecchio – Porto-Vecchio | 6.5 km (4 mi) | Individual time trial | Cadel Evans (AUS) |
| 3 | 25 March | Porto-Vecchio – Col de l’Ospedale | 198 km (123 mi) | Mountain stage | Pierrick Fédrigo (FRA) |

== Teams ==
- RadioShack–Nissan
- BMC Racing Team
- Cofidis
- Team Sky
- FDJ–BigMat
- Garmin–Barracuda
- Ag2r–La Mondiale
- Euskaltel–Euskadi
- Team Europcar
- Colombia–Coldeportes
- Saur–Sojasun
- Project 1t4i
- Bretagne–Schuller
- Team Type 1–Sanofi
- La Pomme Marseille
- Auber 93

== Stages ==
=== Stage 1 ===
24 March 2012 – Porto-Vecchio to Porto-Vecchio, 89.5 km

Stage 1 Results

| | Rider | Team | Time |
|---|---|---|---|
| 1 | Florian Vachon (FRA) | Bretagne–Schuller | 2h 03' 48" |
| 2 | Danilo Wyss (SUI) | BMC Racing Team | + 0" |
| 3 | Clément Koretzky (FRA) | La Pomme Marseille | + 0" |
| 4 | Simon Geschke (GER) | Project 1t4i | + 0" |
| 5 | Nicolas Bazin (FRA) | Auber 93 | + 0" |
| 6 | Geoffroy Lequatre (FRA) | Bretagne–Schuller | + 0" |
| 7 | Giovanni Bernaudeau (FRA) | Team Europcar | + 0" |
| 8 | Romain Hardy (FRA) | Bretagne–Schuller | + 0" |
| 9 | Jens Voigt (GER) | RadioShack–Nissan | + 0" |
| 10 | Linus Gerdemann (GER) | RadioShack–Nissan | + 0" |

General Classification after Stage 1

| | Rider | Team | Time |
|---|---|---|---|
| 1 | Florian Vachon (FRA) | Bretagne–Schuller | 2h 03' 42" |
| 2 | Danilo Wyss (SUI) | BMC Racing Team | + 2" |
| 3 | Christophe Riblon (FRA) | Ag2r–La Mondiale | + 3" |
| 4 | Clément Koretzky (FRA) | La Pomme Marseille | + 4" |
| 5 | Mickaël Buffaz (FRA) | Cofidis | + 4" |
| 6 | Linus Gerdemann (GER) | RadioShack–Nissan | + 5" |
| 7 | Simon Geschke (GER) | Project 1t4i | + 6" |
| 8 | Nicolas Bazin (FRA) | Auber 93 | + 6" |
| 9 | Geoffroy Lequatre (FRA) | Bretagne–Schuller | + 6" |
| 10 | Giovanni Bernaudeau (FRA) | Team Europcar | + 6" |

=== Stage 2 ===
24 March 2012 – Porto-Vecchio to Porto-Vecchio, 6.5 km

Stage 2 Results

| | Rider | Team | Time |
|---|---|---|---|
| 1 | Cadel Evans (AUS) | BMC Racing Team | 7' 21" |
| 2 | Michael Rogers (AUS) | Team Sky | + 0" |
| 3 | Simon Geschke (GER) | Project 1t4i | + 1" |
| 4 | Anthony Roux (FRA) | FDJ–BigMat | + 2" |
| 5 | Maxime Monfort (BEL) | RadioShack–Nissan | + 2" |
| 6 | Marco Pinotti (ITA) | BMC Racing Team | + 2" |
| 7 | David Zabriskie (USA) | Garmin–Barracuda | + 2" |
| 8 | Brent Bookwalter (USA) | BMC Racing Team | + 2" |
| 9 | Christophe Riblon (FRA) | Ag2r–La Mondiale | + 5" |
| 10 | Tom Dumoulin (NED) | Project 1t4i | + 5" |

General Classification after Stage 2

| | Rider | Team | Time |
|---|---|---|---|
| 1 | Cadel Evans (AUS) | BMC Racing Team | 2h 11' 09" |
| 2 | Michael Rogers (AUS) | Team Sky | + 0" |
| 3 | Simon Geschke (GER) | Project 1t4i | + 1" |
| 4 | Maxime Monfort (BEL) | RadioShack–Nissan | + 2" |
| 5 | Marco Pinotti (ITA) | BMC Racing Team | + 2" |
| 6 | Christophe Riblon (FRA) | Ag2r–La Mondiale | + 2" |
| 7 | Brent Bookwalter (USA) | BMC Racing Team | + 2" |
| 8 | Thomas Löfkvist (SWE) | Team Sky | + 6" |
| 9 | Luke Rowe (GBR) | Team Sky | + 8" |
| 10 | Benoît Vaugrenard (FRA) | FDJ–BigMat | + 9" |

=== Stage 3 ===
27 March 2012 – Porto-Vecchio to Col de l’Ospedale, 198 km

Stage 3 Results

| | Rider | Team | Time |
|---|---|---|---|
| 1 | Pierrick Fédrigo (FRA) | FDJ–BigMat | 4h 52' 34" |
| 2 | Rinaldo Nocentini (ITA) | Ag2r–La Mondiale | + 0" |
| 3 | Lars Petter Nordhaug (NOR) | Team Sky | + 0" |
| 4 | Cadel Evans (AUS) | BMC Racing Team | + 0" |
| 5 | Guillaume Levarlet (FRA) | Saur–Sojasun | + 8" |
| 6 | Christophe Le Mével (FRA) | Garmin–Barracuda | + 8" |
| 7 | Igor Antón (ESP) | Euskaltel–Euskadi | + 8" |
| 8 | Michael Rogers (AUS) | Team Sky | + 8" |
| 9 | Jean-Christophe Péraud (FRA) | Ag2r–La Mondiale | + 20" |
| 10 | Hubert Dupont (FRA) | Ag2r–La Mondiale | + 21" |

Final General Classification

| | Rider | Team | Time |
|---|---|---|---|
| 1 | Cadel Evans (AUS) | BMC Racing Team | 7h 03' 43" |
| 2 | Pierrick Fédrigo (FRA) | FDJ–BigMat | + 8" |
| 3 | Michael Rogers (AUS) | Team Sky | + 8" |
| 4 | Lars Petter Nordhaug (NOR) | Team Sky | + 9" |
| 5 | Rinaldo Nocentini (ITA) | Ag2r–La Mondiale | + 9" |
| 6 | Maxime Monfort (BEL) | RadioShack–Nissan | + 23" |
| 7 | Igor Antón (ESP) | Euskaltel–Euskadi | + 38" |
| 8 | Thomas Löfkvist (SWE) | Team Sky | + 42" |
| 9 | Hubert Dupont (FRA) | Ag2r–La Mondiale | + 47" |
| 10 | Christophe Riblon (FRA) | Ag2r–La Mondiale | + 1' 11" |

== Classification leadership ==
| Stage | Winner | General classification | Points classification | Mountains classification | Young rider classification | Team Classification |
|---|---|---|---|---|---|---|
| 1 | Florian Vachon | Florian Vachon | Florian Vachon | Julien Bérard | Clément Koretzky | Bretagne–Schuller |
| 2 | Cadel Evans | Cadel Evans | Simon Geschke | Julien Bérard | Luke Rowe | BMC Racing Team |
| 3 | Pierrick Fédrigo | Cadel Evans | Cadel Evans | Matteo Montaguti | Cyril Gautier | Team Sky |
| Final | | Cadel Evans | Cadel Evans | Matteo Montaguti | Cyril Gautier | Team Sky |

== Final standings ==
=== General classification ===
| | Rider | Team | Time |
|---|---|---|---|
| 1 | Cadel Evans (AUS) | BMC Racing Team | 7h 03' 43" |
| 2 | Pierrick Fédrigo (FRA) | FDJ–BigMat | + 8" |
| 3 | Michael Rogers (AUS) | Team Sky | + 8" |
| 4 | Lars Petter Nordhaug (NOR) | Team Sky | + 9" |
| 5 | Rinaldo Nocentini (ITA) | Ag2r–La Mondiale | + 9" |
| 6 | Maxime Monfort (BEL) | RadioShack–Nissan | + 23" |
| 7 | Igor Antón (ESP) | Euskaltel–Euskadi | + 38" |
| 8 | Thomas Löfkvist (SWE) | Team Sky | + 42" |
| 9 | Hubert Dupont (FRA) | Ag2r–La Mondiale | + 47" |
| 10 | Christophe Riblon (FRA) | Ag2r–La Mondiale | + 1' 11" |

=== Points classification ===
| | Rider | Team | Points |
|---|---|---|---|
| 1 | Cadel Evans (AUS) | BMC Racing Team | 23 |
| 2 | Simon Geschke (GER) | Project 1t4i | 18 |
| 3 | Michael Rogers (AUS) | Team Sky | 16 |
| 4 | Pierrick Fédrigo (FRA) | FDJ–BigMat | 15 |
| 5 | Florian Vachon (FRA) | Bretagne–Schuller | 15 |
| 6 | Rinaldo Nocentini (ITA) | Ag2r–La Mondiale | 12 |
| 7 | Lars Petter Nordhaug (NOR) | Team Sky | 10 |
| 8 | Clément Koretzky (FRA) | La Pomme Marseille | 10 |
| 9 | Anthony Roux (FRA) | FDJ–BigMat | 8 |
| 10 | Maxime Monfort (BEL) | RadioShack–Nissan | 7 |

=== Mountains classification ===
| | Rider | Team | Points |
|---|---|---|---|
| 1 | Matteo Montaguti (ITA) | Ag2r–La Mondiale | 24 |
| 2 | George Bennett (NZL) | RadioShack–Nissan | 12 |
| 3 | Pierrick Fédrigo (FRA) | FDJ–BigMat | 6 |
| 4 | Julien Bérard (FRA) | Ag2r–La Mondiale | 6 |
| 5 | Rinaldo Nocentini (ITA) | Ag2r–La Mondiale | 4 |
| 6 | Grégoire Tarride (FRA) | La Pomme Marseille | 4 |
| 7 | Nicolas Vogondy (FRA) | Cofidis | 4 |
| 8 | Lars Petter Nordhaug (NOR) | Team Sky | 2 |
| 9 | David Lelay (FRA) | Saur–Sojasun | 2 |

=== Young rider classification ===
| | Rider | Team | Time |
|---|---|---|---|
| 1 | Cyril Gautier (FRA) | Team Europcar | 7h 05' 12" |
| 2 | Alexandre Geniez (FRA) | Project 1t4i | + 4" |
| 3 | Darwin Atapuma (COL) | Colombia–Coldeportes | + 1' 43" |
| 4 | Davide Malacarne (ITA) | Team Europcar | + 2' 02" |
| 5 | Dimitri Le Boulch (FRA) | Auber 93 | + 2' 27" |
| 6 | Romain Hardy (FRA) | Bretagne–Schuller | + 2' 40" |
| 7 | Vegard Stake Laengen (NOR) | Team Type 1–Sanofi | + 2' 41" |
| 8 | Rudy Molard (FRA) | Team Sky | + 2' 43" |
| 9 | Ben King (USA) | RadioShack–Nissan | + 3' 12" |
| 10 | Pierre-Luc Périchon (FRA) | La Pomme Marseille | + 3' 28" |

=== Team classification ===
| Pos. | Team | Time |
|---|---|---|
| 1 | Team Sky | 21h 12' 07″ |
| 2 | Ag2r–La Mondiale | + 9″ |
| 3 | BMC Racing Team | + 3' 34″ |
| 4 | Euskaltel–Euskadi | + 4' 49″ |
| 5 | FDJ–BigMat | + 5' 44″ |
| 6 | RadioShack–Nissan | + 7' 12″ |
| 7 | Bretagne–Schuller | + 8' 04″ |
| 8 | Team Europcar | + 8' 26″ |
| 9 | Saur–Sojasun | + 9' 10″ |
| 10 | Team Type 1–Sanofi | + 9' 12″ |
