= 2013 Critérium International =

2013 UCI Europe Tour

Race details
- Dates: 23–24 March 2013
- Stages: 3
- Distance: 272 km (169.0 mi)
- Winning time: 6h 55' 23"

Results
Jersey awarded to the overall winner	Winner	Chris Froome (GBR)	(Team Sky)
	Second	Richie Porte (AUS)	(Team Sky)
	Third	Tejay van Garderen (USA)	(BMC Racing Team)
Jersey awarded to the points classification winner	Points	Richie Porte (AUS)	(Team Sky)
Jersey awarded to the mountains classification winner	Mountains	Jérémy Roy (FRA)	(FDJ)
Jersey awarded to the youth classification winner	Youth	Tejay van Garderen (USA)	(BMC Racing Team)
Jersey awarded to the team classification winner	Team	Ag2r–La Mondiale	

The 2013 Critérium International, was the 82nd running of the Critérium International cycling stage race. It took place on the island of Corsica and was won by Chris Froome of Team Sky.

== Schedule ==
Stage	Date	Course	Distance	Type	Winner
1	23 March	Porto-Vecchio – Porto-Vecchio	89 km (55 mi)	Medium-mountain stage	Theo Bos (NED)
2	23 March	Porto-Vecchio – Porto-Vecchio	7 km (4 mi)	Individual time trial	Richie Porte (AUS)
3	24 March	Porto-Vecchio – Col de l'Ospedale	176 km (109 mi)	Mountain stage	Chris Froome (GBR)

== Stages ==
=== Stage 1 ===
23 March 2013 – Porto-Vecchio to Porto-Vecchio, 89.5 km (55.6 mi)

Stage 1 result

	Rider	Team	Time
1	Theo Bos (NED)	Blanco Pro Cycling	2h 02' 43"
2	Nacer Bouhanni (FRA)	FDJ	+ 0"
3	Jonathan Cantwell (AUS)	Saxo–Tinkoff	+ 0"
4	Clément Koretzky (FRA)	Bretagne–Séché Environnement	+ 0"
5	Simon Geschke (GER)	Argos–Shimano	+ 0"
6	Jonathan Hivert (FRA)	Sojasun	+ 0"
7	Kévin Reza (FRA)	Team Europcar	+ 0"
8	Yannick Martinez (FRA)	La Pomme Marseille	+ 0"
9	Fabian Schmidt (FRA)	Sojasun	+ 0"
10	Justin Jules (FRA)	La Pomme Marseille	+ 0"

General Classification after Stage 1

	Rider	Team	Time
1	Theo Bos (NED)	Blanco Pro Cycling	2h 02' 37"
2	Nacer Bouhanni (FRA)	FDJ	+ 2"
3	Yukiya Arashiro (JPN)	Team Europcar	+ 3"
4	Jonathan Cantwell (AUS)	Saxo–Tinkoff	+ 4"
5	Romain Hardy (FRA)	Cofidis	+ 4"
6	Jérémy Roy (FRA)	FDJ	+ 5"
7	Clément Koretzky (FRA)	Bretagne–Séché Environnement	+ 6"
8	Simon Geschke (GER)	Argos–Shimano	+ 6"
9	Jonathan Hivert (FRA)	Sojasun	+ 6"
10	Kévin Reza (FRA)	Team Europcar	+ 6"

=== Stage 2 ===
23 March 2013 – Porto-Vecchio to Porto-Vecchio, 7 km (4.3 mi) individual time trial (ITT)

Stage 2 result

	Rider	Team	Time
1	Richie Porte (AUS)	Team Sky	9' 10"
2	Manuele Boaro (ITA)	Saxo–Tinkoff	+ 1"
3	Tejay van Garderen (USA)	BMC Racing Team	+ 1"
4	Chris Froome (GBR)	Team Sky	+ 2"
5	Andrew Talansky (USA)	Garmin–Sharp	+ 7"
6	Jean-Christophe Péraud (FRA)	Ag2r–La Mondiale	+ 7"
7	Bob Jungels (LUX)	RadioShack–Leopard	+ 7"
8	Andreas Klöden (GER)	RadioShack–Leopard	+ 9"
9	Jérôme Coppel (FRA)	Cofidis	+ 11"
10	Bauke Mollema (NED)	Blanco Pro Cycling	+ 11"

General Classification after Stage 2

	Rider	Team	Time
1	Richie Porte (AUS)	Team Sky	2h 11' 53"
2	Manuele Boaro (ITA)	Saxo–Tinkoff	+ 1"
3	Tejay van Garderen (USA)	BMC Racing Team	+ 1"
4	Chris Froome (GBR)	Team Sky	+ 2"
5	Andrew Talansky (USA)	Garmin–Sharp	+ 7"
6	Jean-Christophe Péraud (FRA)	Ag2r–La Mondiale	+ 7"
7	Bob Jungels (LUX)	RadioShack–Leopard	+ 7"
8	Andreas Klöden (GER)	RadioShack–Leopard	+ 9"
9	Jérôme Coppel (FRA)	Cofidis	+ 11"
10	Bauke Mollema (NED)	Blanco Pro Cycling	+ 11"

=== Stage 3 ===
24 March 2013 – Porto-Vecchio to Col de l'Ospedale, 176 km (109.4 mi)

Stage 3 result

	Rider	Team	Time
1	Chris Froome (GBR)	Team Sky	4h 43' 38"
2	Richie Porte (AUS)	Team Sky	+ 30"
3	Bauke Mollema (NED)	Blanco Pro Cycling	+ 45"
4	Jean-Christophe Péraud (FRA)	Ag2r–La Mondiale	+ 45"
5	Tejay van Garderen (USA)	BMC Racing Team	+ 45"
6	Andrew Talansky (USA)	Garmin–Sharp	+ 53"
7	Johann Tschopp (SUI)	IAM Cycling	+ 57"
8	John Gadret (FRA)	Ag2r–La Mondiale	+ 1' 07"
9	Pierrick Fédrigo (FRA)	FDJ	+ 1' 08"
10	Maxime Bouet (FRA)	Ag2r–La Mondiale	+ 1' 08"

Final General Classification

	Rider	Team	Time
1	Chris Froome (GBR)	Team Sky	6h 55' 23"
2	Richie Porte (AUS)	Team Sky	+ 32"
3	Tejay van Garderen (USA)	BMC Racing Team	+ 54"
4	Bauke Mollema (NED)	Blanco Pro Cycling	+ 1' 00"
5	Jean-Christophe Péraud (FRA)	Ag2r–La Mondiale	+ 1' 00"
6	Andrew Talansky (USA)	Garmin–Sharp	+ 1' 06"
7	Maxime Bouet (FRA)	Ag2r–La Mondiale	+ 1' 33"
8	Pierrick Fédrigo (FRA)	FDJ	+ 1' 37"
9	Johann Tschopp (SUI)	IAM Cycling	+ 1' 43"
10	John Gadret (FRA)	Ag2r–La Mondiale	+ 2' 05"

== Classification leadership ==
Stage	Winner	General classification	Points classification	Mountains classification	Young rider classification	Team Classification
1	Theo Bos	Theo Bos	Theo Bos	Arnaud Gérard	Nacer Bouhanni	Sojasun
2	Richie Porte	Richie Porte	Richie Porte	Arnaud Gérard	Tejay van Garderen	Team Sky
3	Chris Froome	Chris Froome	Richie Porte	Jérémy Roy	Tejay van Garderen	Ag2r–La Mondiale
Final		Chris Froome	Richie Porte	Jérémy Roy	Tejay van Garderen	Ag2r–La Mondiale
