= 2015 Critérium International =

2015 UCI Europe Tour

Race details
- Dates: 28–29 March 2015
- Stages: 3
- Distance: 289 km (179.6 mi)
- Winning time: 7h 35' 45"

Results
Jersey awarded to the overall winner	Winner	Jean-Christophe Péraud (FRA)	(AG2R La Mondiale)
	Second	Thibaut Pinot (FRA)	(FDJ)
	Third	Fabio Felline (ITA)	(Trek Factory Racing)
Jersey awarded to the points classification winner	Points	Fabio Felline (ITA)	(Trek Factory Racing)
Jersey awarded to the mountains classification winner	Mountains	Marco Canola (ITA)	(UnitedHealthcare)
Jersey awarded to the youth classification winner	Youth	Thibaut Pinot (FRA)	(FDJ)
	Team	AG2R La Mondiale	

The 2015 Critérium International was the 84th edition of the Critérium International cycling stage race. It took place on the island of Corsica, around the city of Porto-Vecchio. Just like the previous three editions, the race consisted of three stages, two on the first race day (including a short individual time trial) and one on the second day.

The race was won by Jean-Christophe Péraud of AG2R La Mondiale for the second year in a row, having claimed the overall lead by winning the final stage. Thibaut Pinot (FDJ) finished second in the general classification and won the young rider classification. Fabio Felline of Trek Factory Racing, who won the time trial on stage 2, was third in the general classification and won the points classification. UnitedHealthcare's rider Marco Canola claimed the mountains classification, while French team AG2R La Mondiale won the teams classification.

== Schedule ==
Stage	Date	Course	Distance	Type	Winner
1	28 March	Porto-Vecchio to Porto-Vecchio	92.5 km (57 mi)	Hilly stage	Ben King (USA)
2	28 March	Porto-Vecchio to Porto-Vecchio	7 km (4 mi)	Individual time trial	Fabio Felline (ITA)
3	29 March	Porto-Vecchio to Col de l'Ospedale	189.5 km (118 mi)	Mountain stage	Jean-Christophe Péraud (FRA)
Total		289 km (179.6 mi)			

== Teams ==
A total of 16 teams were selected to take part in the race:

World Teams

- AG2R La Mondiale
- FDJ
- IAM Cycling
- Cannondale–Garmin
- Tinkoff–Saxo
- Trek Factory Racing
- Team Giant–Alpecin

Professional Continental teams

- Bretagne–Séché Environnement
- Bora–Argon 18
- Cofidis
- Cult Energy Pro Cycling
- Team Europcar
- Team Roompot
- UnitedHealthcare

Continental teams

- Auber 93
- Team Marseille 13 KTM

== Stages ==
=== Stage 1 ===
28 March 2015 — Porto-Vecchio to Porto-Vecchio, 92.5 km (57.5 mi)

Stage 1 result
Rank	Rider	Team	Time
1	Ben King (USA)	Cannondale–Garmin	2h 06' 43"
2	Clément Saint-Martin (FRA)	Team Marseille 13 KTM	+ 5"
3	Romain Feillu (FRA)	Bretagne–Séché Environnement	+ 39"
4	Tom Veelers (NED)	Team Giant–Alpecin	+ 39"
5	Clément Venturini (FRA)	Cofidis	+ 39"
6	Benjamin Giraud (FRA)	Team Marseille 13 KTM	+ 39"
7	Marco Canola (ITA)	UnitedHealthcare	+ 39"
8	Julián Arredondo (COL)	Trek Factory Racing	+ 39"
9	Jay McCarthy (AUS)	Tinkoff–Saxo	+ 39"
10	Fabio Felline (ITA)	Trek Factory Racing	+ 39"

General classification after stage 1
Rank	Rider	Team	Time
1	Ben King (USA)	Cannondale–Garmin	2h 06' 34"
2	Clément Saint-Martin (FRA)	Team Marseille 13 KTM	+ 8"
3	Romain Feillu (FRA)	Bretagne–Séché Environnement	+ 46"
4	Thibaut Pinot (FRA)	FDJ	+ 47"
5	Tom Veelers (NED)	Team Giant–Alpecin	+ 48"
6	Clément Venturini (FRA)	Cofidis	+ 48"
7	Benjamin Giraud (FRA)	Team Marseille 13 KTM	+ 48"
8	Marco Canola (ITA)	UnitedHealthcare	+ 48"
9	Julián Arredondo (COL)	Trek Factory Racing	+ 48"
10	Jay McCarthy (AUS)	Tinkoff–Saxo	+ 48"

=== Stage 2 ===
28 March 2015 — Porto-Vecchio to Porto-Vecchio, 7 km (4.3 mi), individual time trial (ITT)

Stage 2 result
Rank	Rider	Team	Time
1	Fabio Felline (ITA)	Trek Factory Racing	9' 11"
2	Bob Jungels (LUX)	Trek Factory Racing	+ 1"
3	Manuele Boaro (ITA)	Tinkoff–Saxo	+ 2"
4	Thibaut Pinot (FRA)	FDJ	+ 6"
5	Ramūnas Navardauskas (LTU)	Cannondale–Garmin	+ 9"
6	Anthony Delaplace (FRA)	Bretagne–Séché Environnement	+ 11"
7	Mathias Frank (SUI)	IAM Cycling	+ 12"
8	Stef Clement (NED)	IAM Cycling	+ 13"
9	Julien Loubet (FRA)	Team Marseille 13 KTM	+ 15"
10	Pierrick Fédrigo (FRA)	Bretagne–Séché Environnement	+ 16"

General classification after stage 2
Rank	Rider	Team	Time
1	Ben King (USA)	Cannondale–Garmin	2h 16' 06"
2	Clément Saint-Martin (FRA)	Team Marseille 13 KTM	+ 24"
3	Fabio Felline (ITA)	Trek Factory Racing	+ 27"
4	Bob Jungels (LUX)	Trek Factory Racing	+ 28"
5	Manuele Boaro (ITA)	Tinkoff–Saxo	+ 29"
6	Thibaut Pinot (FRA)	FDJ	+ 32"
7	Ramūnas Navardauskas (LTU)	Cannondale–Garmin	+ 36"
8	Anthony Delaplace (FRA)	Bretagne–Séché Environnement	+ 38"
9	Mathias Frank (SUI)	IAM Cycling	+ 39"
10	Stef Clement (NED)	IAM Cycling	+ 40"

=== Stage 3 ===
29 March 2015 — Porto-Vecchio to Col de l'Ospedale, 189.5 km (117.7 mi)

Stage 3 result
Rank	Rider	Team	Time
1	Jean-Christophe Péraud (FRA)	AG2R La Mondiale	5h 19' 05"
2	Pierrick Fédrigo (FRA)	Bretagne–Séché Environnement	+ 15"
3	Thibaut Pinot (FRA)	FDJ	+ 16"
4	Jan Bakelants (BEL)	AG2R La Mondiale	+ 25"
5	Fabio Felline (ITA)	Trek Factory Racing	+ 25"
6	Alexis Vuillermoz (FRA)	AG2R La Mondiale	+ 25"
7	Nicolas Edet (FRA)	Cofidis	+ 25"
8	Julián Arredondo (COL)	Trek Factory Racing	+ 30"
9	José Mendes (POR)	Bora–Argon 18	+ 30"
10	Manuele Boaro (ITA)	Tinkoff–Saxo	+ 51"

Final general classification
Rank	Rider	Team	Time
1	Jean-Christophe Péraud (FRA)	AG2R La Mondiale	7h 35' 45"
2	Thibaut Pinot (FRA)	FDJ	+ 10"
3	Fabio Felline (ITA)	Trek Factory Racing	+ 18"
4	Pierrick Fédrigo (FRA)	Bretagne–Séché Environnement	+ 18"
5	José Mendes (POR)	Bora–Argon 18	+ 40"
6	Jan Bakelants (BEL)	AG2R La Mondiale	+ 41"
7	Nicolas Edet (FRA)	Cofidis	+ 43"
8	Julián Arredondo (COL)	Trek Factory Racing	+ 44"
9	Alexis Vuillermoz (FRA)	AG2R La Mondiale	+ 45"
10	Manuele Boaro (ITA)	Tinkoff–Saxo	+ 46"

== Classification leadership table ==
Stage	Winner	General classification	Points classification	Mountains classification	Young rider classification	Team Classification
1	Ben King	Ben King	Ben King	Ben King	Clément Saint-Martin	Cannondale–Garmin
2	Fabio Felline	Ben King	Ben King	Ben King	Clément Saint-Martin	Cannondale–Garmin
3	Jean-Christophe Péraud	Jean-Christophe Péraud	Fabio Felline	Marco Canola	Thibaut Pinot	AG2R La Mondiale
Final		Jean-Christophe Péraud	Fabio Felline	Marco Canola	Thibaut Pinot	AG2R La Mondiale
