= Michał Kwiatkowski =

Polish road racing cyclist

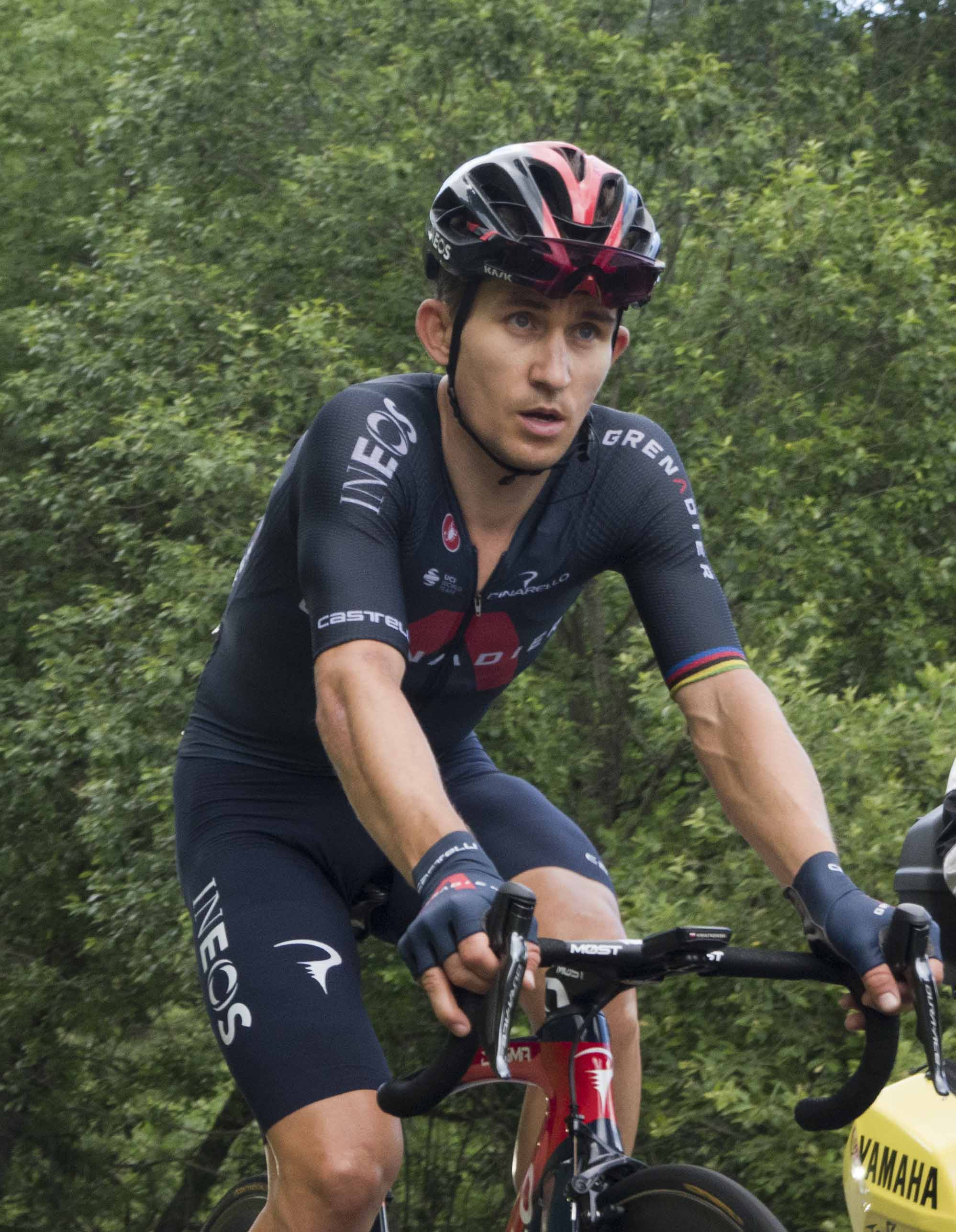
- Kwiatkowski at the 2021 Tour de France

Personal information
- Full name: Michał Kwiatkowski
- Nicknames: Kwiato, Kwiatek
- Born: 2 June 1990 (age 36) Chełmża, Poland
- Height: 1.76 m (5 ft 9 in)
- Weight: 68 kg (150 lb)

Cycling career
- Sport: Cycling
- Current team: Netcompany–Ineos
- Discipline: Road
- Role: Rider
- Rider type: All-rounder

Amateur team
- 2009: MG Kvis–Norda Pacific

Professional teams
- 2010: Caja Rural
- 2011: Team RadioShack
- 2012–2015: Omega Pharma–Quick-Step
- 2016–: Team Sky

Major wins
- Grand Tours Tour de France 2 individual stages (2020, 2023) Vuelta a España 1 TTT stage (2016) Stage races Tirreno–Adriatico (2018) Tour de Pologne (2018) Volta ao Algarve (2014, 2018) One-day races and Classics World Road Race Championships (2014) National Road Race Championships (2013, 2018) National Time Trial Championships (2014, 2017, 2023, 2026) Milan–San Remo (2017) Amstel Gold Race (2015, 2022) E3 Harelbeke (2016) Clásica de San Sebastián (2017) Strade Bianche (2014, 2017) Clásica Jaén Paraíso Interior (2025)
Medal record
Men's road bicycle racing
World Championships
Representing Poland
Gold medal – first place	2014 Ponferrada	Road race
Gold medal – first place	2008 Cape Town	Junior time trial
Representing Omega Pharma–Quick-Step (2013–2014) Etixx–Quick-Step (2015) Team Sky (2017)
Gold medal – first place	2013 Florence	Team time trial
Silver medal – second place	2015 Richmond	Team time trial
Bronze medal – third place	2014 Ponferrada	Team time trial
Bronze medal – third place	2017 Bergen	Team time trial

Michał Kwiatkowski (Polish pronunciation: [ˈmixaw kfjatˈkɔfski], born 2 June 1990) is a Polish professional road bicycle racer, who currently rides for UCI WorldTeam Netcompany–Ineos.

Kwiatkowski is seen as a strong all rounder, with good sprinting, time-trialling and climbing abilities allowing him to win both stage races and one day classics. His talent was shown early in his career, winning the World Junior Time Trial Championships in 2008. In 2014, Kwiatkowski became the world elite road race champion, and he was also a member of the Omega Pharma–Quick-Step team that won the 2013 World Team Time Trial Championships. In 2017 he won his first 'Monument', Milan–San Remo, while in 2018, he won Tirreno–Adriatico and the Tour de Pologne. He is a two-time winner of two of the most prestigious non-Monument classics, the Amstel Gold Race and the Strade Bianche.

== Career ==
=== Early career ===
Kwiatkowski is a double European junior champion, winning the road race in 2007 and the individual time trial in 2008. In 2009 he became national road champion in the under-23 category, and he also won a stage of the Okolo Slovenska. He turned professional in 2010 with Caja Rural and in 2011 joined Team RadioShack, and placed third overall in the Driedaagse van West-Vlaanderen, the Three Days of De Panne and the Tour du Poitou-Charentes.

=== Omega Pharma–Quick Step (2012–2015) ===
==== 2012 ====
Kwiatkowski moved to Omega Pharma–Quick-Step for the 2012 season. He impressed in his first year with the team, winning the prologue of the Driedaagse van West-Vlaanderen. He also finished second overall in his home race, the Tour de Pologne, and eighth overall in the Eneco Tour.

==== 2013 ====
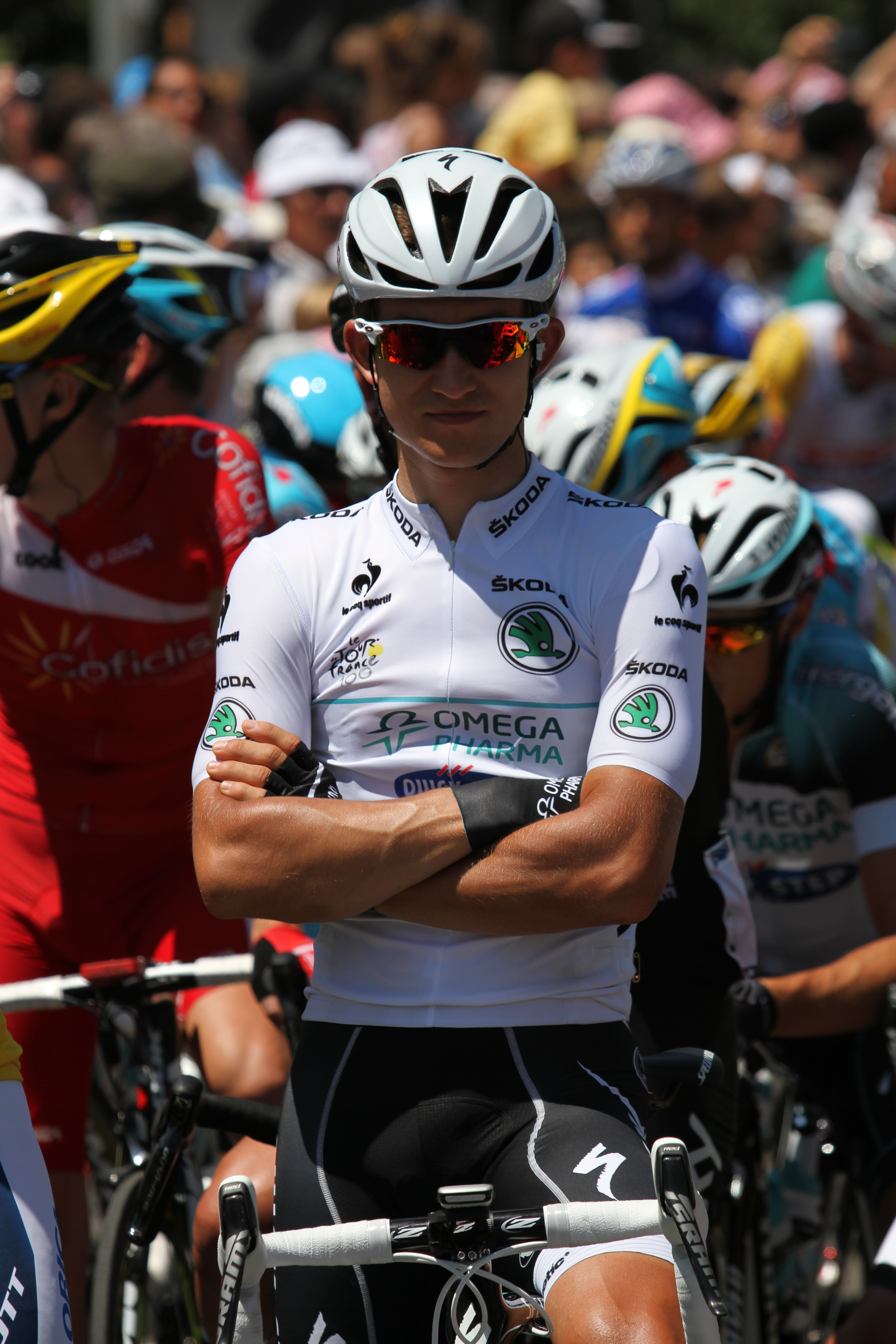
Kwiatkowski wearing the white jersey of young rider classification leader at the 2013 Tour de France; Kwiatkowski held the classification lead for ten days during the race, and finished third in those standings behind Nairo Quintana and Andrew Talansky.

Kwiatkowski began the 2013 season in excellent form, placing second overall in the Volta ao Algarve. He then finished fourth overall in Tirreno–Adriatico, and won the young rider classification, after proving one of the strongest climbers in the race. He finished fourth at the summit finish of Prati di Tivo to take the overall race lead from team-mate Mark Cavendish, before surrendering it the next day. Kwiatkowski then rode a strong classics campaign, placing fourth in the Amstel Gold Race and fifth in La Flèche Wallonne. In June, he won the senior National Road Race Championships for the first time.

Kwiatkowski's excellent form saw him selected to ride the Tour de France. He wore the white jersey – of young rider classification leader – in the first week after coming third on Stage 2 and fourth on Stage 3, both reduced bunch sprints. On Stage 7 he came in fourth again. On Stage 9 (a high mountain stage) he reached the podium once again. With a strong time trial, he was able to regain the white jersey of the young rider classification on Stage 11, but lost the lead shortly after to Nairo Quintana. Even though he lost the white jersey, he still finished 11th in his Tour debut.

==== 2014 ====
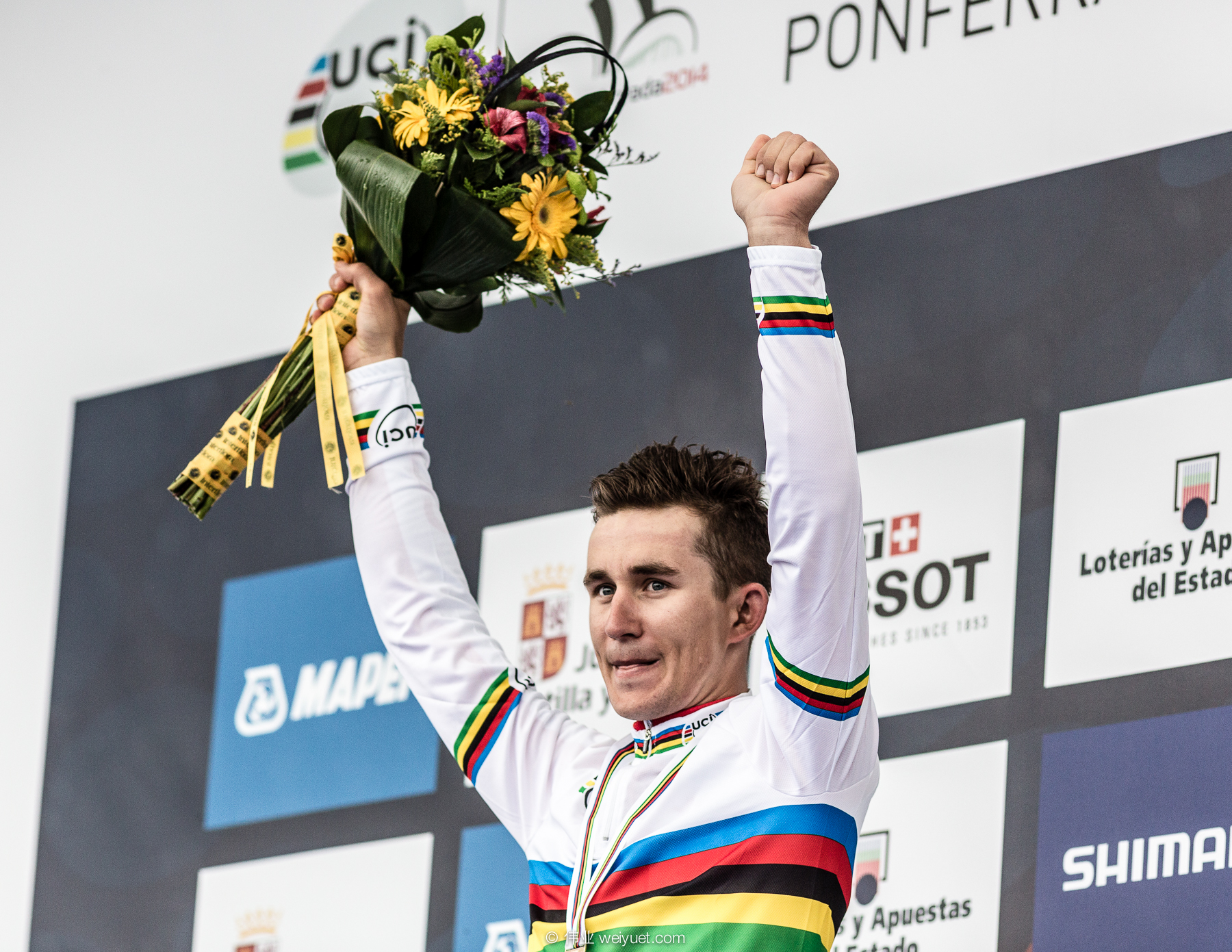
Kwiatkowski on the podium after winning the 2014 UCI World Road Race Championships

In 2014, Kwiatkowski won the Italian Classic Strade Bianche. He followed a strong attack from Peter Sagan with 20 kilometres (12 miles) to go and the pair cooperated well until Kwiatkowski dropped Sagan on the final climb to Siena. He placed on the third step of the podium in Liège–Bastogne–Liège as well as in La Flèche Wallonne and fifth in the Amstel Gold Race.

In September, he grabbed the leader's jersey of the Tour of Britain by winning the fourth stage in a select group sprint of 6 riders. Overall he placed second in the general classification and first in the points classification.

Later that same month he became the first Polish cyclist to win the UCI Road Race World Championships. Kwiatkowski made a solo attack about 7 kilometres (4.3 miles) from the finish line on a downhill section. Despite a late chase, he was able to hold the lead and coast across the finish line, winning the rainbow jersey. After the race, Kwiatkowski posted his winning ride on Strava, which helped determine his statistics for the event. He climbed 5,106 metres (16,752 feet) and burned 6,338 kilocalories (26,520 kilojoules) during the course of 6:29:45, producing an average power of 240 watts with an average heartbeat of 148 beats per minute. He rode his first race in the rainbow jersey at Il Lombardia and finished 77th.

==== 2015 ====
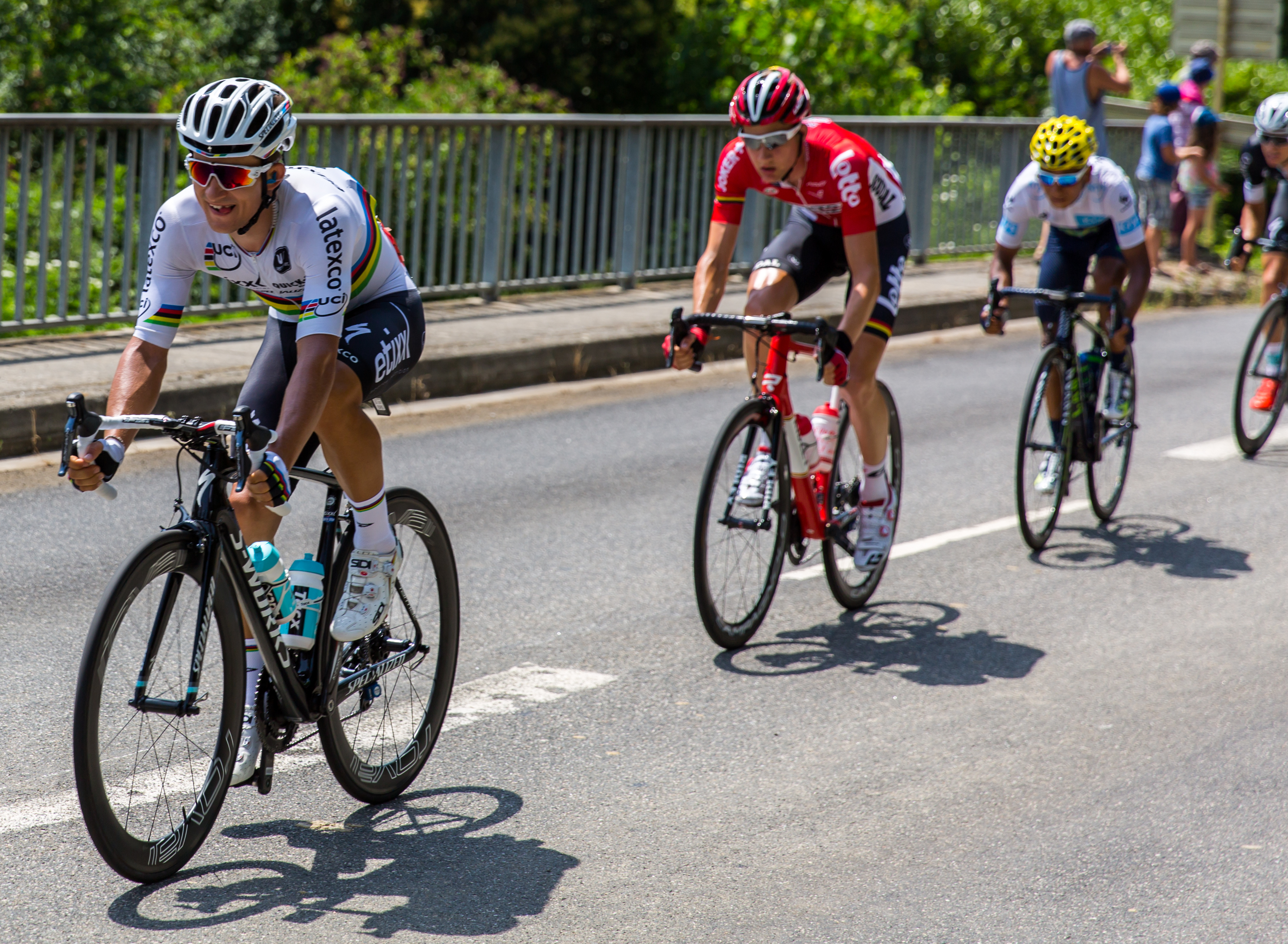
Kwiatkowski, wearing the rainbow jersey as the incumbent world champion, at the 2015 Tour de France

Being reigning world champion, Kwiatkowski tended to start the 2015 year with a less aggressive approach than 2014 for the bigger race later on in the year. He used the Volta ao Algarve and Paris–Nice as warm up races to prepare for the classics campaign, finishing second overall in both events. In April, Kwiatkowski earned a prestigious victory at the Amstel Gold Race. After the last climb of the Cauberg, he had to work to join a small group led by Philippe Gilbert. Before the finish line, a regrouping of about fifteen riders formed and Kwiatkowski outsprinted them to add the Dutch classic to his palmarès.

He abandoned the 2015 Tour de France during Stage 17.

=== Team Sky / Team Ineos (2016–present) ===
==== 2016 ====
On 27 September 2015, Team Sky announced the signing of Kwiatkowski for the 2016 season.

On 25 March 2016, Kwiatkowski won his first cobbled classic, E3 Harelbeke, by outsprinting Peter Sagan after the pair broke away from an elite group with 30 kilometres (19 miles) remaining. He was named in the startlist for the Vuelta a España, After Team Sky won the opening time trial, Kwiatkowski took the race leader's red jersey after finishing fourth on stage 2. However, he lost the race lead to the Movistar Team's Rubén Fernández the following day, and abandoned on stage 7 with a back injury. This marked a culmination of a difficult season for Kwiatkowski, after illnesses earlier in the year had wrecked his Ardennes classics campaign and led to him missing out on selection for the Tour de France.

==== 2017 ====
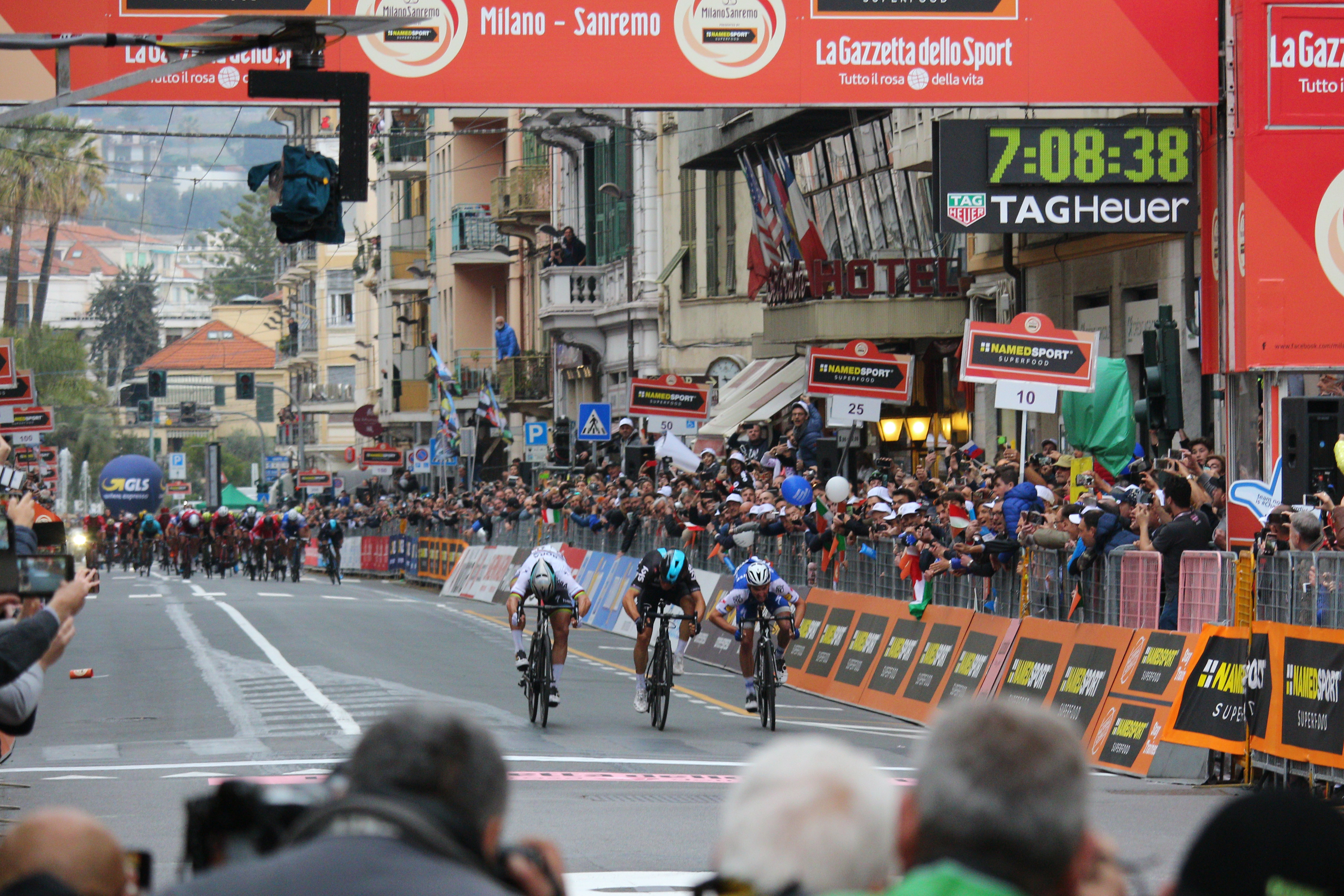
Kwiatkowski winning the 2017 Milan–San Remo by narrowly outsprinting Peter Sagan and Julian Alaphilippe on the Via Roma.

On 4 March 2017, Kwiatkowski won the Strade Bianche after attacking from a group of four race favourites with around 15 kilometres (9.3 miles) remaining and he was able to solo away to the race victory in Siena. By doing so, he became the second rider, after Fabian Cancellara, to win multiple editions of the race. Later that month, Kwiatkowski won Milan–San Remo in a three-up sprint finish ahead of world champion Peter Sagan (Bora–Hansgrohe) and Quick-Step Floors rider Julian Alaphilippe after the trio broke clear on the race's final climb – the Poggio di San Remo. This was his first victory on one of the Monuments. On 16 April, Kwiatkowski took second place in the Amstel Gold Race after being defeated by Philippe Gilbert (Quick-Step Floors) in a two-up sprint finish.

He was selected for Sky's Tour de France squad thanks to his recent successes, fulfilling his goal since joining the team of getting to ride the Tour with team leader Chris Froome. He finished 8th on the opening stage in Düsseldorf as well as 2nd in the final time trial in Marseille. However, it was his selfless efforts in support of Froome that gained him much praise from fans and media as a "super-domestique", especially shown on stage 14 to Rodez where he set up his team leader perfectly for the final run-in and on stage 15 to Le Puy-en-Velay, surrendering his back wheel to Froome when he had a mechanical on the ascent of the Col de Peyra Talliade. On 29 July he won Clásica de San Sebastián, outsprinting Tony Gallopin, Bauke Mollema, Tom Dumoulin and teammate Mikel Landa in a five-man sprint finish. Over a week later, he signed a 3-year contract extension with Team Sky.

==== 2018 ====
At the Volta ao Algarve in February 2018, Kwiatkowski, whilst sitting second overall behind teammate Geraint Thomas, was part of a 31-man breakaway which went clear in the opening kilometres of the final stage. Kwiatkowski held on to win the stage on the Malhão to take overall victory by 1 minute 31 seconds over Thomas. In March, Kwiatkowski again took a leader's jersey from Thomas on the fourth stage at Tirreno–Adriatico. Thomas suffered a mechanical issue 1.5 kilometres (0.93 miles) from the summit of the final climb to Sarnano–Sassotetto, that resulted in him losing 34 seconds and the overall leader's blue jersey to Kwiatkowski. Kwiatkowski held on to win the race overall. In July Kwiatkowski again played a supporting role for Team Sky at the 2018 Tour de France, helping Thomas to win the race overall and Chris Froome to finish third overall. One week after the Tour de France, in early August, Kwiatkowski rode his home race, the Tour de Pologne. He won stage 4, with a steep uphill finish in Szczyrk, and successfully defended his lead in the following stages to win the race overall.

==== 2023 ====
He rode in the 2023 Tour de France, where he won stage 13.

In November, he ran the 2023 New York City Marathon with his wife, Agata, in a time of 4:11:34.

== Major results ==
2007
UEC European Junior Road Championships

1st Road race
2nd Time trial

1st Overall Course de la Paix Juniors

1st Points classification
1st Young rider classification
1st Stage 1

10th Overall Giro della Lunigiana

1st Stage 2

2008
1st Time trial, UCI Junior Road World Championships
UEC European Junior Road Championships

1st Time trial
9th Road race

1st Overall Trofeo Karlsberg

1st Stage 1

1st Overall Course de la Paix Juniors
2009
1st Road race, National Under-23 Road Championships
1st Stage 2 Okolo Slovenska
4th Memoriał Henryka Łasaka
4th Gran Premio della Liberazione
7th Giro del Mendrisiotto
10th Trofeo Edil C
10th Coupe des Carpathes
2010
4th Overall Szlakiem Grodów Piastowskich
7th Overall Volta ao Alentejo
10th Gran Premio de Llodio
2011
3rd Overall Driedaagse van West-Vlaanderen
3rd Overall Three Days of De Panne
3rd Overall Tour du Poitou-Charentes
6th Grand Prix de Wallonie
2012 (1 pro win)
1st Prologue Driedaagse van West-Vlaanderen
2nd Time trial, National Road Championships
2nd Overall Tour de Pologne
8th Overall Eneco Tour
2013 (1)
1st Team time trial, UCI Road World Championships
National Road Championships

1st Road race
2nd Time trial

2nd Overall Volta ao Algarve
4th Overall Tirreno–Adriatico

1st Young rider classification
1st Stage 1 (TTT)

4th Amstel Gold Race
5th La Flèche Wallonne
5th Grand Prix de Wallonie
Tour de France

Held after Stages 2–7 & 11–14

2014 (9)
UCI Road World Championships

1st Road race
3rd Team time trial

1st Time trial, National Road Championships
1st Overall Volta ao Algarve

1st Stages 2 & 3 (ITT)

1st Strade Bianche
1st Trofeo Serra de Tramuntana
1st Prologue Tour de Romandie
1st Stage 1 (TTT) Tirreno–Adriatico
2nd Overall Tour of the Basque Country

1st Points classification

2nd Overall Tour of Britain

1st Points classification
1st Stage 4

3rd Liège–Bastogne–Liège
3rd La Flèche Wallonne
5th Amstel Gold Race
7th Trofeo Ses Salines
Tour de France

Held after Stages 8–9

2015 (2)
1st Amstel Gold Race
UCI Road World Championships

2nd Team time trial
8th Road race

2nd Overall Paris–Nice

1st Young rider classification
1st Prologue

2nd Overall Volta ao Algarve
4th Dwars door Vlaanderen
8th Overall Tour of the Basque Country
Tour de France

Combativity award Stages 2 & 12

2016 (1)
1st E3 Harelbeke
Vuelta a España

1st Stage 1 (TTT)
Held after Stage 2

2nd Trofeo Pollenca-Port de Andratx
2nd Trofeo Serra de Tramuntana
8th Overall Tirreno–Adriatico
2017 (4)
1st Time trial, National Road Championships
1st Milan–San Remo
1st Clásica de San Sebastián
1st Strade Bianche
2nd Overall Volta ao Algarve
2nd Amstel Gold Race
3rd Team time trial, UCI Road World Championships
3rd Liège–Bastogne–Liège
5th Overall Tour of Britain
6th UCI World Tour
7th La Flèche Wallonne
2018 (9)
National Road Championships

1st Road race
3rd Time trial

1st Overall Tirreno–Adriatico
1st Overall Tour de Pologne

1st Points classification
1st Stages 4 & 5

1st Overall Volta ao Algarve

1st Points classification
1st Stages 2 & 5

Critérium du Dauphiné

1st Prologue & Stage 3 (TTT)

4th Time trial, UCI Road World Championships
Vuelta a España

Held after Stages 2–4
Held after Stages 2–6
Held after Stages 2–4 & 6
Combativity award Stage 14

2019
3rd Overall Paris–Nice

1st Points classification

3rd Milan–San Remo
4th Time trial, National Road Championships
10th Overall UAE Tour
2020 (1)
1st Stage 18 Tour de France
4th Road race, UCI Road World Championships
4th Gran Trittico Lombardo
6th La Flèche Wallonne
6th Brabantse Pijl
10th Liège–Bastogne–Liège
2021
1st Stage 3 (TTT) Tour of Britain
2nd Overall Étoile de Bessèges
3rd Overall Tour de Pologne
8th Amstel Gold Race
2022 (1)
1st Amstel Gold Race
2023 (2)
1st Time trial, National Road Championships
Tour de France

1st Stage 13
Combativity award Stage 13

3rd Overall Tour de Pologne
2024
4th Vuelta a Murcia
7th Clásica Jaén Paraíso Interior
2025 (1)
1st Clásica Jaén Paraíso Interior
3rd Overall CRO Race
Combativity award Stage 9 Vuelta a España
2026 (1)
1st Time trial, National Road Championships
1st Stage 3 (TTT) Paris–Nice

=== General classification results timeline ===
Grand Tour general classification results
Grand Tour	2012	2013	2014	2015	2016	2017	2018	2019	2020	2021	2022	2023	2024	2025
Giro d'Italia	136	—	—	—	—	—	—	—	—	—	—	—	—	—
Tour de France	—	11	28	DNF	—	57	49	83	30	68	—	49	54	—
Vuelta a España	—	—	—	—	DNF	—	43	—	—	—	—	—	—	83
Major stage race general classification results
Major stage race	2012	2013	2014	2015	2016	2017	2018	2019	2020	2021	2022	2023	2024	2025
Paris–Nice	—	—	—	2	—	—	—	3	—	—	—	—	—	—
Tirreno–Adriatico	—	4	18	—	8	27	1	—	—	51	—	90	98	DNF
Volta a Catalunya	—	—	—	—	—	—	—	—	NH	—	DNF	—	—	—
Tour of the Basque Country	—	—	2	8	—	30	DNF	DNF	NH	—	—	—	DNF	—
Tour de Romandie	DNF	—	DNF	—	DNF	—	—	—	NH	—	—	—	—	—
Critérium du Dauphiné	—	DNF	DNF	—	DNF	43	49	29	DNF	68	DNF	—	32	—
Tour de Suisse	—	—	—	71	—	—	—	—	NH	—	—	29	—	—

=== Classics results timeline ===
Monument	2011	2012	2013	2014	2015	2016	2017	2018	2019	2020	2021	2022	2023	2024	2025
Milan–San Remo	—	—	DNF	DNF	67	40	1	11	3	15	17	16	139	54	—
Tour of Flanders	DNF	—	40	—	—	27	—	28	—	54	—	—	—	—	—
Paris–Roubaix	—	—	—	—	—	—	—	—	—	NH	70	77	—	—	—
Liège–Bastogne–Liège	—	DNF	92	3	21	36	3	29	12	10	11	100	DNF	DNF	—
Giro di Lombardia	DNF	—	DNF	77	54	—	DNF	—	—	—	—	—	—	—	—
Classic	2011	2012	2013	2014	2015	2016	2017	2018	2019	2020	2021	2022	2023	2024	2025
Strade Bianche	—	—	—	1	—	20	1	30	—	12	DNF	—	18	DNF	DNF
Dwars door Vlaanderen	—	—	—	—	4	—	—	—	—	NH	—	—	—	—	—
E3 Harelbeke	—	41	82	—	—	1	—	—	—	NH	—	—	DNF	—	—
Gent–Wevelgem	75	—	DNF	—	—	—	—	—	—	DNF	—	—	DNF	—	—
Brabantse Pijl	—	—	—	—	—	—	—	—	—	6	—	—	DNF	—	—
Amstel Gold Race	—	DNF	4	5	1	DNF	2	31	11	NH	8	1	72	35	—
La Flèche Wallonne	—	DNF	5	3	33	—	7	57	16	6	23	92	115	DNF	—
Clásica de San Sebastián	—	—	DNF	—	—	107	1	—	—	NH	—	—	—	—	89

=== Major championships timeline ===
Event		2011	2012	2013	2014	2015	2016	2017	2018	2019	2020	2021	2022	2023	2024
Olympic Games	Road race	NH	60	Not held			62	Not held				11	Not held		—
Olympic Games	Time trial	NH	—	Not held			14	Not held				—	Not held		23
World Championships	Road race	31	—	DNF	1	8	—	11	DNF	—	4	36	—	DNF	—
World Championships	Time trial	48	—	24	—	—	—	—	4	—	—	—	—	—	—
National Championships	Road race	—	16	1	21	57	25	—	1	—	—	—	—	10	—
National Championships	Time trial	21	2	2	1	—	—	1	3	4	—	—	—	1	—

=== Awards ===
- International Flandrien of the Year: 2014
- Gold Cross of Merit (Krzyż Zasługi): 2014
