= Pierrick Fédrigo =

French road bicycle racer (born 1978)

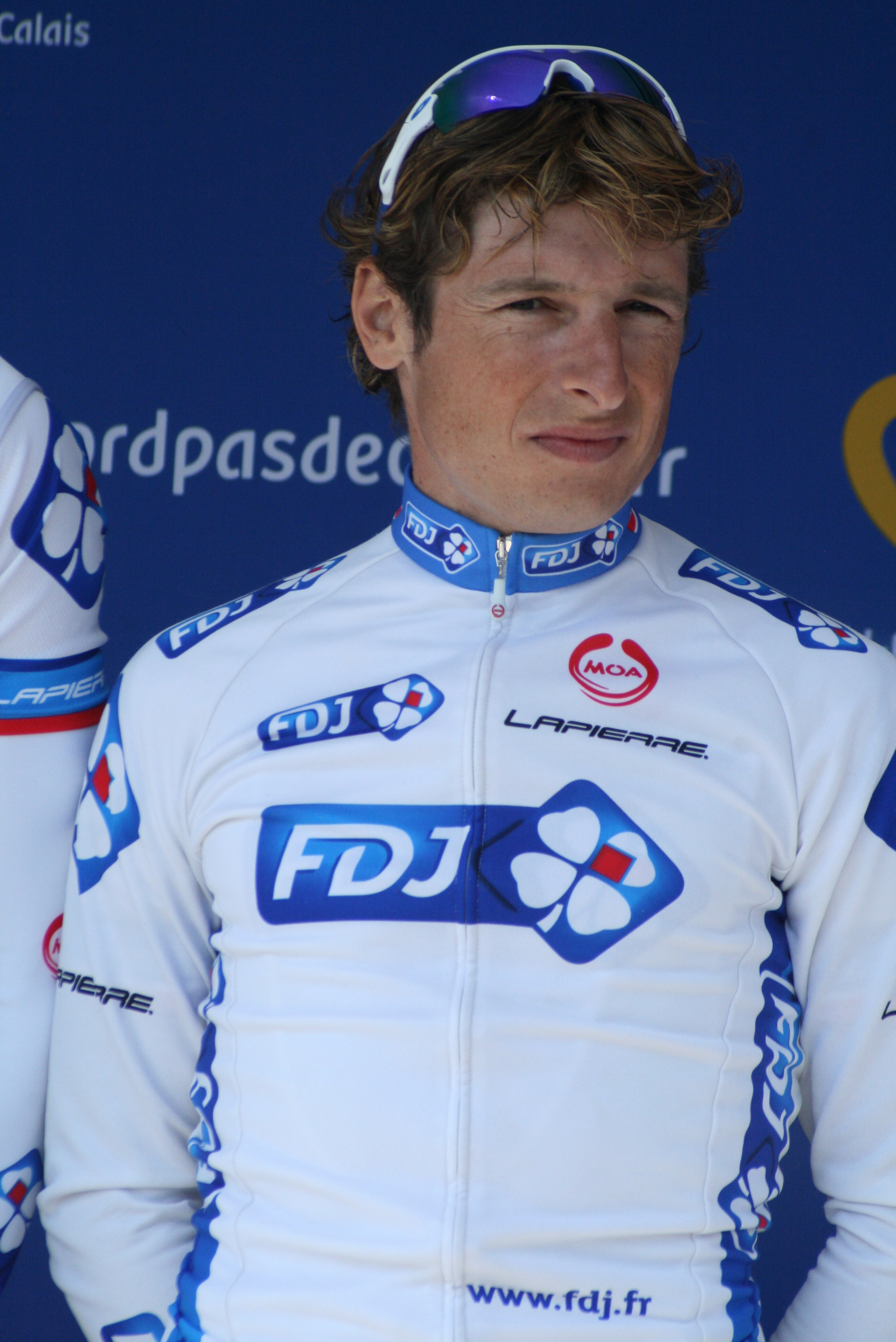
- Fédrigo at the 2011 Four Days of Dunkirk

Personal information
- Full name: Pierrick Fédrigo
- Nickname: Le nez de Marmande
- Born: 30 November 1978 (age 47) Marmande, France
- Height: 1.72 m (5 ft 8 in)
- Weight: 66 kg (146 lb)

Cycling career
- Sport: Cycling
- Current team: Retired
- Discipline: Road
- Role: Rider

Professional teams
- 2002–2004: Crédit Agricole
- 2005–2010: Bouygues Télécom
- 2011–2014: FDJ
- 2015–2016: Bretagne–Séché Environnement

Major wins
- Grand Tours Tour de France 4 stages (2006, 2009, 2010, 2012) Stage Races Four Days of Dunkirk (2005) Critérium International (2010) One-Day Races and Classics National Road Race Championships (2005) GP Ouest-France (2008)

Pierrick Fédrigo (born 30 November 1978) is a French former racing cyclist, who rode professionally between 2002 and 2016 for the Crédit Agricole, Bbox Bouygues Telecom, FDJ.fr and Fortuneo–Vital Concept teams. He was the winner of the French National Road Race Championships in 2005, and won four stages at the Tour de France.

== Career ==
Fédrigo won 4 stages of the Tour de France: Stage 14 at Gap in 2006, Stage 9 at Tarbes in 2009, and two stages in Pau: Stage 16 of the 2010 race, and Stage 15 of the 2012 edition. In the 2010 edition, he was part of a select group that conquered two Hors Catégorie climbs and two Category one climbs. He battled it out with his seven breakaway companions in the final sprint, which included Lance Armstrong, and prevailed. Fédrigo has also won races including the Four Days of Dunkirk in 2005 and the Criterium International in 2010. His nickname is "le nez de Marmande" (The nose of Marmande) due to his remarkable nose. In September 2014, Bretagne–Séché Environnement announced that they had signed Fédrigo for 2015. In August 2016 Fédrigo announced that he would retire from competition after the GP Ouest-France.

== Major results ==
1999
1st Flèche Ardennaise
5th Overall Ronde de l'Isard

1st Stage 5

2001
10th Grand Prix d'Isbergues
2002
1st Stage 3 Paris–Corrèze
2nd Overall Tour de l'Avenir
3rd Overall Tour du Limousin

1st Young rider classification
1st Stage 4

3rd Tour du Doubs
6th Grand Prix d'Isbergues
2003
5th Overall Tour de l'Avenir

1st Stage 6

5th Grand Prix d'Ouverture La Marseillaise
2004
1st Overall Tour du Limousin

1st Stage 2

3rd Route Adélie
3rd À travers le Morbihan
4th Overall Four Days of Dunkirk
5th Overall Étoile de Bessèges
5th Grand Prix de Villers-Cotterêts
6th Tour de Vendée
7th Trophée des Grimpeurs
8th Cholet-Pays de Loire
8th Polynormande
9th Paris–Camembert
2005
1st Road race, National Road Championships
1st Overall Four Days of Dunkirk
1st Cholet-Pays de Loire
8th Trophée des Grimpeurs
2006
1st Stage 4 Four Days of Dunkirk
1st Stage 14 Tour de France
2nd Overall Route du Sud
2nd Overall Tour du Limousin

1st Stage 1

2nd Tour du Finistère
7th GP Ouest–France
2007
1st Overall Tour du Limousin
2nd Road race, National Road Championships
5th Tour de Vendée
6th Tour du Haut Var
6th Grand Prix de Plumelec-Morbihan
2008
1st GP Ouest–France
3rd Overall Étoile de Bessèges
3rd Overall Four Days of Dunkirk

1st Stage 4

5th Overall Tour du Limousin
8th Overall Volta a Catalunya

1st Stage 3

9th Tour du Finistère
2009
Critérium du Dauphiné Libéré

1st Mountains classification
1st Stage 6

1st Stage 9 Tour de France
2nd Tour du Finistère
2nd GP Ouest–France
6th Overall Four Days of Dunkirk

1st Stage 5

8th Overall Tour du Haut Var
10th Overall Étoile de Bessèges
2010
1st Overall Critérium International

1st Points classification
1st Stage 1

1st Stage 16 Tour de France
2nd Les Boucles du Sud-Ardèche
3rd Classic Loire Atlantique
4th Grand Prix de Plumelec-Morbihan
5th Overall Tour du Haut Var
10th Overall Étoile de Bessèges
10th Overall Four Days of Dunkirk
2011
2nd Grand Prix Cycliste de Montréal
2nd Grand Prix de Plumelec-Morbihan
4th Overall Étoile de Bessèges
4th Overall Circuit de la Sarthe
5th Overall Four Days of Dunkirk
5th Paris–Camembert
8th Overall Critérium International
10th Les Boucles du Sud-Ardèche
2012
1st Stage 15 Tour de France
2nd Overall Critérium International

1st Stage 3

4th Grand Prix de Plumelec-Morbihan
4th Boucles de l'Aulne
5th Cholet-Pays de Loire
6th Overall Four Days of Dunkirk
7th Overall Étoile de Bessèges
9th Overall Circuit de la Sarthe
10th Overall Tour du Haut Var
2013
1st Paris–Camembert
4th Overall Tour du Haut Var
6th Overall Étoile de Bessèges
7th Overall Tour du Limousin
8th Overall Critérium International
9th Overall Circuit de la Sarthe
2014
4th Cholet-Pays de Loire
10th La Drôme Classic
10th Grand Prix de Plumelec-Morbihan
2015
1st Cholet-Pays de Loire
2nd Paris–Camembert
3rd Grand Prix de Plumelec-Morbihan
4th Overall Critérium International
4th Boucles de l'Aulne
5th Polynormande
6th Grand Prix de la Somme
9th Overall Circuit de la Sarthe
2016
4th Overall Four Days of Dunkirk
8th Classic Loire Atlantique

=== Grand Tour general classification results timeline ===
Grand Tour	2003	2004	2005	2006	2007	2008	2009	2010	2011	2012	2013	2014	2015
Giro d'Italia	Did not contest during his career												
Tour de France	DNF	76	46	29	84	32	56	57	—	48	59	—	52
Vuelta a España	—	—	DNF	—	—	—	DNF	—	—	—	—	—	—

Legend
—	Did not compete
DNF	Did not finish
