= 2018 Tour de Pologne =

2018 UCI World Tour, race 28 of 37
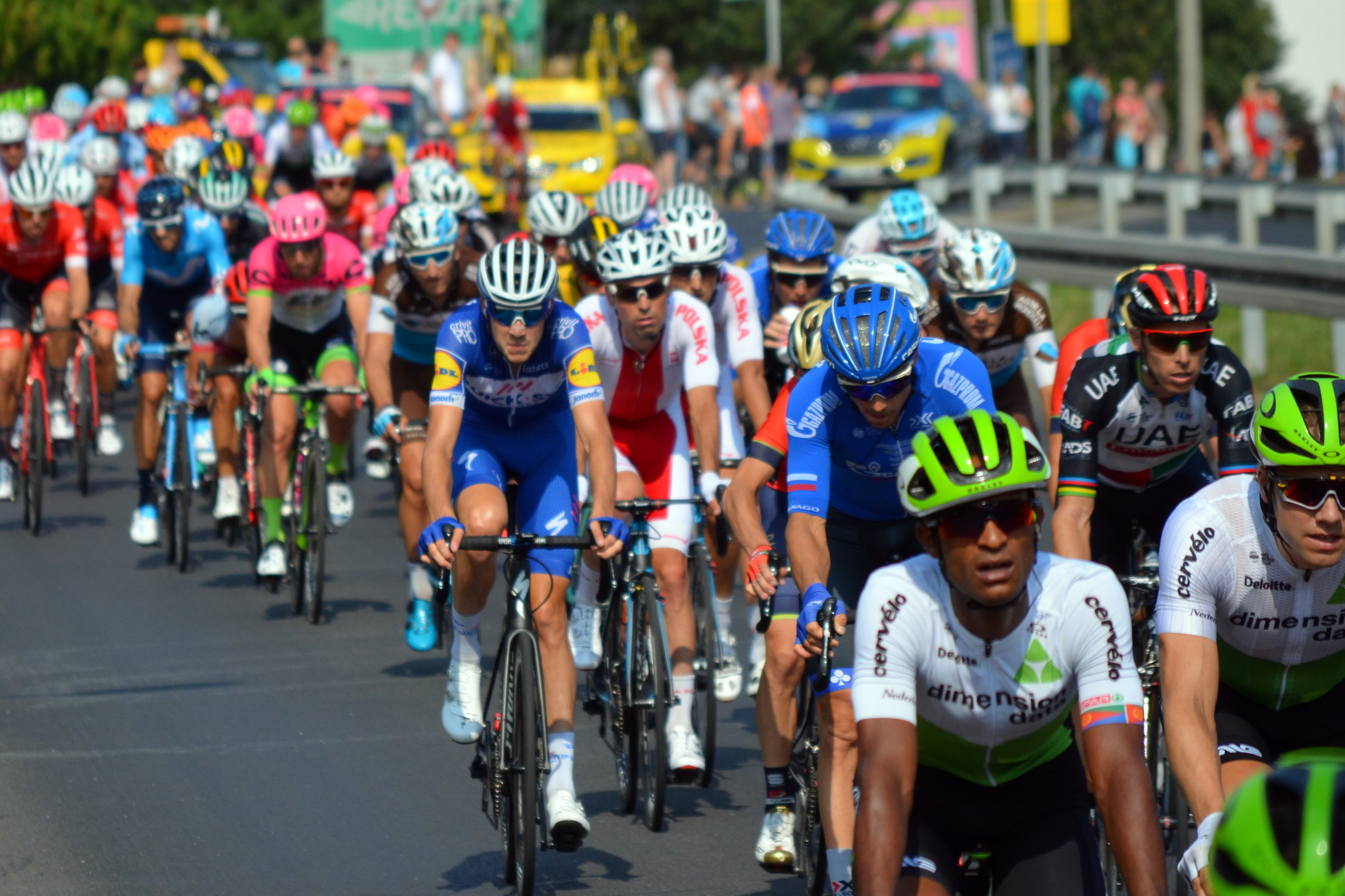

Race details
- Dates: 4–10 August 2018
- Stages: 7
- Distance: 1,014 km (630.1 mi)

Results
Jersey awarded to the overall winner	Winner	Michał Kwiatkowski (POL)	(Team Sky)
	Second	Simon Yates (GBR)	(Mitchelton–Scott)
	Third	Thibaut Pinot (FRA)	(Groupama–FDJ)
Jersey awarded to the mountains classification winner	Mountains	Patrick Konrad (AUT)	(Bora–Hansgrohe)
Jersey awarded to the sprints classification winner	Sprints	Michał Kwiatkowski (POL)	(Team Sky)
Jersey awarded to the combativity classification winner	Combativity	Jenthe Biermans (BEL)	(Team Katusha–Alpecin)
	Team	AG2R La Mondiale	

The 2018 Tour de Pologne was a road cycling stage race that took place between 4 and 10 August in Poland. It was the 75th edition of the Tour de Pologne and the twenty-eighth event of the 2018 UCI World Tour. The race was won by Michał Kwiatkowski riding for Team Sky.

== Schedule ==
The sixth stage was initially scheduled to run between Zakopane and Poprad in Slovakia and be 180 km (112 mi) long, but due to financial difficulties two months before the stage was run, the finish was changed to Bukowina Tatrzańska and the stage rescheduled to run over 130 km (81 mi).

Stage characteristics and winners
Stage	Date	Route	Distance	Type	Winner	Leader of the GC
1	4 August	Main Square, Kraków to Kraków	134 km (83 mi)	Flat stage	Pascal Ackermann (GER)	Pascal Ackermann
2	5 August	Tarnowskie Góry to Katowice	~~156 km (97 mi)~~ 144 km (89 mi)	Flat stage	Pascal Ackermann (GER)	Pascal Ackermann
3	6 August	Silesian Stadium, Chorzów to Zabrze	139 km (86 mi)	Flat stage	Álvaro José Hodeg (COL)	Álvaro José Hodeg
4	7 August	Jaworzno to Szczyrk	179 km (111 mi)	Mountain stage	Michał Kwiatkowski (POL)	Michał Kwiatkowski
5	8 August	Wieliczka Salt Mine to Bielsko-Biała	152 km (94 mi)	Medium-mountain stage	Michał Kwiatkowski (POL)	Michał Kwiatkowski
6	9 August	Zakopane to Terma Bukowina Tatrzańska	130 km (81 mi)	Mountain stage	Georg Preidler (AUT)	Michał Kwiatkowski
7	10 August	Terma Bukowina Tatrzańska to Bukowina Tatrzańska	136 km (85 mi)	Mountain stage	Simon Yates (GBR)	Michał Kwiatkowski
Total		~~1,026 km (637.5 mi)~~ 1,014 km (630.1 mi)				

== Teams ==
As the 2018 Tour de Pologne was a UCI World Tour event, all eighteen UCI WorldTeams were invited automatically and obliged to enter a team into the race. Along with a Polish national team, three other squads were given wildcard places into the race, and as such, formed the event's 22-team peloton.

UCI WorldTeams

- Team Sky
- AG2R La Mondiale
- Astana
- Bahrain–Merida
- BMC Racing Team
- Bora–Hansgrohe
- Lotto–Soudal
- Mitchelton–BikeExchange
- Movistar Team
- Quick-Step Floors
- Team Dimension Data
- EF Education First–Drapac p/b Cannondale
- Team Katusha–Alpecin
- LottoNL–Jumbo
- Team Sunweb
- Trek–Segafredo
- UAE Team Emirates
- Groupama–FDJ

UCI Professional Continental teams

- CCC–Sprandi–Polkowice
- Cofidis
- Gazprom–RusVelo

National team

- Poland

== Stages ==
=== Stage 1 ===
4 August 2018 – Main Square, Kraków to Kraków, 134 km (83.3 mi)

Stage 1 result
Rank	Rider	Team	Time
1	Pascal Ackermann (GER)	Bora–Hansgrohe	2h 59' 11"
2	Álvaro José Hodeg (COL)	Quick-Step Floors	+ 0"
3	Matteo Trentin (ITA)	Mitchelton–Scott	+ 0"
4	Giacomo Nizzolo (ITA)	Trek–Segafredo	+ 0"
5	Danny van Poppel (NED)	LottoNL–Jumbo	+ 0"
6	Mike Teunissen (NED)	Team Sunweb	+ 0"
7	Simone Consonni (ITA)	UAE Team Emirates	+ 0"
8	Clément Venturini (FRA)	AG2R La Mondiale	+ 0"
9	Maciej Paterski (POL)	Poland (national team)	+ 0"
10	Paweł Franczak (POL)	CCC–Sprandi–Polkowice	+ 0"

General classification after Stage 1
Rank	Rider	Team	Time
1	Pascal Ackermann (GER)	Bora–Hansgrohe	2h 59' 01"
2	Álvaro José Hodeg (COL)	Quick-Step Floors	+ 4"
3	Matteo Trentin (ITA)	Mitchelton–Scott	+ 6"
4	Alessandro de Marchi (ITA)	BMC Racing Team	+ 7"
5	Michał Paluta (POL)	CCC–Sprandi–Polkowice	+ 8"
6	Stéphane Rossetto (FRA)	Cofidis	+ 9"
7	Giacomo Nizzolo (ITA)	Trek–Segafredo	+ 10"
8	Danny van Poppel (NED)	LottoNL–Jumbo	+ 10"
9	Mike Teunissen (NED)	Team Sunweb	+ 10"
10	Simone Consonni (ITA)	UAE Team Emirates	+ 10"

=== Stage 2 ===
5 August 2018 – Tarnowskie Góry to Katowice, ~~156 km (97 mi)~~144 km (89 mi)

Because of the peloton being misled onto an incorrect route, the stage was shortened by 12 km (7 mi).

Stage 2 result
Rank	Rider	Team	Time
1	Pascal Ackermann (GER)	Bora–Hansgrohe	3h 16' 39"
2	Álvaro José Hodeg (COL)	Quick-Step Floors	+ 0"
3	Giacomo Nizzolo (ITA)	Trek–Segafredo	+ 0"
4	Luka Mezgec (SLO)	Mitchelton–Scott	+ 0"
5	Simone Consonni (ITA)	UAE Team Emirates	+ 0"
6	Niccolò Bonifazio (ITA)	Bahrain–Merida	+ 0"
7	Marc Sarreau (FRA)	Groupama–FDJ	+ 0"
8	Mike Teunissen (NED)	Team Sunweb	+ 0"
9	Clément Venturini (FRA)	AG2R La Mondiale	+ 0"
10	Kamil Zieliński (POL)	Poland (national team)	+ 0"

General classification after Stage 2
Rank	Rider	Team	Time
1	Pascal Ackermann (GER)	Bora–Hansgrohe	6h 15' 30"
2	Álvaro José Hodeg (COL)	Quick-Step Floors	+ 8"
3	Jenthe Biermans (BEL)	Team Katusha–Alpecin	+ 11"
4	Giacomo Nizzolo (ITA)	Trek–Segafredo	+ 16"
5	Matteo Trentin (ITA)	Mitchelton–Scott	+ 16"
6	Jan Bakelants (BEL)	AG2R La Mondiale	+ 16"
7	Alessandro de Marchi (ITA)	BMC Racing Team	+ 17"
8	Michał Paluta (POL)	CCC–Sprandi–Polkowice	+ 18"
9	Stéphane Rossetto (FRA)	Cofidis	+ 19"
10	Simone Consonni (ITA)	UAE Team Emirates	+ 20"

=== Stage 3 ===
6 August 2018 – Silesian Stadium, Chorzów to Zabrze, 139 km (86.4 mi)

Stage 3 result
Rank	Rider	Team	Time
1	Álvaro José Hodeg (COL)	Quick-Step Floors	3h 09' 59"
2	Daniel McLay (GBR)	EF Education First–Drapac p/b Cannondale	+ 0"
3	André Greipel (GER)	Lotto–Soudal	+ 0"
4	Sacha Modolo (ITA)	EF Education First–Drapac p/b Cannondale	+ 0"
5	Matteo Trentin (ITA)	Mitchelton–Scott	+ 0"
6	Giacomo Nizzolo (ITA)	Trek–Segafredo	+ 0"
7	Michael Mørkøv (DEN)	Quick-Step Floors	+ 0"
8	Marc Sarreau (FRA)	Groupama–FDJ	+ 0"
9	Jürgen Roelandts (BEL)	BMC Racing Team	+ 0"
10	Mike Teunissen (NED)	Team Sunweb	+ 0"

General classification after Stage 3
Rank	Rider	Team	Time
1	Álvaro José Hodeg (COL)	Quick-Step Floors	9h 25' 27"
2	Pascal Ackermann (GER)	Bora–Hansgrohe	+ 2"
3	Jenthe Biermans (BEL)	Team Katusha–Alpecin	+ 5"
4	André Greipel (GER)	Lotto–Soudal	+ 15"
5	Michał Paluta (POL)	CCC–Sprandi–Polkowice	+ 16"
6	Giacomo Nizzolo (ITA)	Trek–Segafredo	+ 18"
7	Matteo Trentin (ITA)	Mitchelton–Scott	+ 18"
8	Jan Bakelants (BEL)	AG2R La Mondiale	+ 18"
9	Alessandro de Marchi (ITA)	BMC Racing Team	+ 19"
10	Mathias Le Turnier (FRA)	Cofidis	+ 20"

=== Stage 4 ===
7 August 2018 – Jaworzno to Szczyrk, 179 km (111.2 mi)

Stage 4 result
Rank	Rider	Team	Time
1	Michał Kwiatkowski (POL)	Team Sky	4h 25' 44"
2	Dylan Teuns (BEL)	BMC Racing Team	+ 3"
3	George Bennett (NZL)	LottoNL–Jumbo	+ 3"
4	Sergey Chernetskiy (RUS)	Astana	+ 3"
5	Daniel Moreno (ESP)	EF Education First–Drapac p/b Cannondale	+ 3"
6	Thibaut Pinot (FRA)	Groupama–FDJ	+ 3"
7	Sam Oomen (NED)	Team Sunweb	+ 6"
8	Enrico Gasparotto (ITA)	Bahrain–Merida	+ 6"
9	Sergio Henao (COL)	Team Sky	+ 6"
10	Davide Formolo (ITA)	Bora–Hansgrohe	+ 6"

General classification after Stage 4
Rank	Rider	Team	Time
1	Michał Kwiatkowski (POL)	Team Sky	13h 51' 22"
2	Dylan Teuns (BEL)	BMC Racing Team	+ 8"
3	George Bennett (NZL)	LottoNL–Jumbo	+ 10"
4	Sergey Chernetskiy (RUS)	Astana	+ 14"
5	Thibaut Pinot (FRA)	Groupama–FDJ	+ 14"
6	Daniel Moreno (ESP)	EF Education First–Drapac p/b Cannondale	+ 14"
7	Sam Oomen (NED)	Team Sunweb	+ 17"
8	Enrico Gasparotto (ITA)	Bahrain–Merida	+ 17"
9	Emanuel Buchmann (GER)	Bora–Hansgrohe	+ 17"
10	Fabio Aru (ITA)	UAE Team Emirates	+ 17"

=== Stage 5 ===
8 August 2018 – Wieliczka Salt Mine to Bielsko-Biała, 152 km (94.4 mi)

Stage 5 result
Rank	Rider	Team	Time
1	Michał Kwiatkowski (POL)	Team Sky	3h 39' 14"
2	Dylan Teuns (BEL)	BMC Racing Team	+ 0"
3	Enrico Battaglin (ITA)	LottoNL–Jumbo	+ 0"
4	Pascal Ackermann (GER)	Bora–Hansgrohe	+ 0"
5	Enrico Gasparotto (ITA)	Bahrain–Merida	+ 0"
6	Simon Yates (GBR)	Mitchelton–Scott	+ 0"
7	Simone Consonni (ITA)	UAE Team Emirates	+ 0"
8	Giacomo Nizzolo (ITA)	Trek–Segafredo	+ 0"
8	Edvald Boasson Hagen (NOR)	Team Dimension Data	+ 0"
10	Jan Bakelants (BEL)	AG2R La Mondiale	+ 0"

General classification after Stage 5
Rank	Rider	Team	Time
1	Michał Kwiatkowski (POL)	Team Sky	17h 30' 26"
2	Dylan Teuns (BEL)	BMC Racing Team	+ 12"
3	George Bennett (NZL)	LottoNL–Jumbo	+ 20"
4	Sergey Chernetskiy (RUS)	Astana	+ 24"
5	Thibaut Pinot (FRA)	Groupama–FDJ	+ 24"
6	Daniel Moreno (ESP)	EF Education First–Drapac p/b Cannondale	+ 24"
7	Sam Oomen (NED)	Team Sunweb	+ 27"
8	Enrico Gasparotto (ITA)	Bahrain–Merida	+ 27"
9	Emanuel Buchmann (GER)	Bora–Hansgrohe	+ 27"
10	Fabio Aru (ITA)	UAE Team Emirates	+ 27"

=== Stage 6 ===
9 August 2018 – Zakopane to Terma Bukowina Tatrzańska, 130 km (80.8 mi)

Stage 6 result
Rank	Rider	Team	Time
1	Georg Preidler (AUT)	Groupama–FDJ	3h 16' 01"
2	Emanuel Buchmann (GER)	Bora–Hansgrohe	+ 0"
3	Michał Kwiatkowski (POL)	Team Sky	+ 0"
4	Simon Yates (GBR)	Mitchelton–Scott	+ 0"
5	Dylan Teuns (BEL)	BMC Racing Team	+ 0"
6	Sergey Chernetskiy (RUS)	Astana	+ 0"
7	George Bennett (NZL)	LottoNL–Jumbo	+ 0"
8	Laurens de Plus (BEL)	Quick-Step Floors	+ 0"
9	Thibaut Pinot (FRA)	Groupama–FDJ	+ 0"
10	Richard Carapaz (ECU)	Movistar Team	+ 4"

General classification after Stage 6
Rank	Rider	Team	Time
1	Michał Kwiatkowski (POL)	Team Sky	20h 46' 23"
2	Dylan Teuns (BEL)	BMC Racing Team	+ 16"
3	George Bennett (NZL)	LottoNL–Jumbo	+ 24"
4	Emanuel Buchmann (GER)	Bora–Hansgrohe	+ 25"
5	Sergey Chernetskiy (RUS)	Astana	+ 28"
6	Thibaut Pinot (FRA)	Groupama–FDJ	+ 28"
7	Georg Preidler (AUT)	Groupama–FDJ	+ 29"
8	Laurens de Plus (BEL)	Quick-Step Floors	+ 31"
9	Simon Yates (GBR)	Mitchelton–Scott	+ 39"
10	Sam Oomen (NED)	Team Sunweb	+ 42"

=== Stage 7 ===
10 August 2018 – Terma Bukowina Tatrzańska to Bukowina Tatrzańska, 136 km (84.5 mi)

Stage 7 result
Rank	Rider	Team	Time
1	Simon Yates (GBR)	Mitchelton–Scott	3h 37' 17"
2	Thibaut Pinot (FRA)	Groupama–FDJ	+ 12"
3	Davide Formolo (ITA)	Bora–Hansgrohe	+ 12"
4	Sam Oomen (NED)	Team Sunweb	+ 14"
5	George Bennett (NZL)	LottoNL–Jumbo	+ 14"
6	Michał Kwiatkowski (POL)	Team Sky	+ 14"
7	Enrico Gasparotto (ITA)	Bahrain–Merida	+ 14"
8	Richard Carapaz (ECU)	Movistar Team	+ 16"
9	Georg Preidler (AUT)	Groupama–FDJ	+ 16"
10	Fabio Aru (ITA)	UAE Team Emirates	+ 16"

Final general classification
Rank	Rider	Team	Time
1	Michał Kwiatkowski (POL)	Team Sky	24h 23' 54"
2	Simon Yates (GBR)	Mitchelton–Scott	+ 15"
3	Thibaut Pinot (FRA)	Groupama–FDJ	+ 20"
4	George Bennett (NZL)	LottoNL–Jumbo	+ 24"
5	Dylan Teuns (BEL)	BMC Racing Team	+ 27"
6	Georg Preidler (AUT)	Groupama–FDJ	+ 31"
7	Emanuel Buchmann (GER)	Bora–Hansgrohe	+ 32"
8	Davide Formolo (ITA)	Bora–Hansgrohe	+ 40"
9	Sam Oomen (NED)	Team Sunweb	+ 42"
10	Fabio Aru (ITA)	UAE Team Emirates	+ 44"

== Classification leadership table ==
In the 2018 Tour de Pologne, four different jerseys were awarded. The general classification was calculated by adding each cyclist's finishing times on each stage, and allowing time bonuses for the first three finishers at intermediate sprints (three seconds to first, two seconds to second and one second to third) and at the finish of all stages: the stage winner won a ten-second bonus, with six and four seconds for the second and third riders respectively. The leader of the classification received a yellow jersey; it was considered the most important of the Tour de Pologne, and the winner of the classification was considered the winner of the race.

Points for the mountains classification
Position	1	2	3	4	5
Points for Category P1	20	14	10	6	4
Points for Category 1	10	7	5	3	2
Points for Category 2	5	3	2	1	0
Points for Category 3	3	2	1	0	
Points for Category 4	1	0			

There was also a mountains classification, the leadership of which was marked by a purple jersey. In the mountains classification, points towards the classification were won by reaching the top of a climb before other cyclists. Each climb was categorised as either first, second, third, or fourth-category, with more points available for the higher-categorised climbs. Double points were also awarded for the premier first-category climb on the final stage.

Additionally, there was a sprints classification, which awarded a white jersey. In the points classification, cyclists received points for finishing in the top 20 in a stage. For winning a stage, a rider earned 20 points, with a point fewer per place down to 1 point for 20th place. The fourth and final jersey represented the active rider classification, marked by a blue jersey. This was decided at the race's intermediate sprints, awarding points on a 3–2–1 scale.

There was also a classification for Polish riders, with the highest-placed rider appearing on the podium each day. As well as this, a teams classification was also calculated, in which the times of the best three cyclists per team on each stage were added together; the leading team at the end of the race was the team with the lowest total time.

Stage	Winner	General classification (Polish: Żółta koszulka)	Sprints classification (Polish: Klasyfikacja sprinterska)	Mountains classification (Polish: Klasyfikacja górska)	Active rider classification (Polish: Klasyfikacja najaktywniejszych)	Polish rider classification (Polish: Najlepszy Polak)	Teams classification (Polish: Klasyfikacja drużynowa)
1	Pascal Ackermann	Pascal Ackermann	Pascal Ackermann	Michał Paluta	Alessandro De Marchi	Michał Paluta	Trek–Segafredo
2	Pascal Ackermann	Pascal Ackermann	Pascal Ackermann	Michał Paluta	Jenthe Biermans	Michał Paluta	Trek–Segafredo
3	Álvaro José Hodeg	Álvaro José Hodeg	Álvaro José Hodeg	Michał Paluta	Jenthe Biermans	Michał Paluta	Trek–Segafredo
4	Michał Kwiatkowski	Michał Kwiatkowski	Álvaro José Hodeg	Jan Tratnik	Jenthe Biermans	Michał Kwiatkowski	BMC Racing Team
5	Michał Kwiatkowski	Michał Kwiatkowski	Pascal Ackermann	Jan Tratnik	Jenthe Biermans	Michał Kwiatkowski	BMC Racing Team
6	Georg Preidler	Michał Kwiatkowski	Pascal Ackermann	Łukasz Owsian	Jenthe Biermans	Michał Kwiatkowski	Astana
7	Simon Yates	Michał Kwiatkowski	Michał Kwiatkowski	Patrick Konrad	Jenthe Biermans	Michał Kwiatkowski	AG2R La Mondiale
Final		Michał Kwiatkowski	Michał Kwiatkowski	Patrick Konrad	Jenthe Biermans	Michał Kwiatkowski	AG2R La Mondiale

== Sources ==
- 74. TDP Roadbook. Lang Team. 2017.
