= 2014 Critérium International =

2014 UCI Europe Tour

Race details
- Dates: 29–30 March 2014
- Stages: 3
- Distance: 272 km (169.0 mi)
- Winning time: 7h 00' 12"

Results
Jersey awarded to the overall winner	Winner	Jean-Christophe Péraud (FRA)	(Ag2r–La Mondiale)
	Second	Mathias Frank (SUI)	(IAM Cycling)
	Third	Tiago Machado (POR)	(NetApp–Endura)
Jersey awarded to the points classification winner	Points	Mathias Frank (SUI)	(IAM Cycling)
Jersey awarded to the mountains classification winner	Mountains	Mathias Frank (SUI)	(IAM Cycling)
Jersey awarded to the youth classification winner	Youth	Rafał Majka (POL)	(Tinkoff–Saxo)
	Team	IAM Cycling	

The 2014 Critérium International, was the 83rd edition of the Critérium International cycling stage race. It took place on the island of Corsica, around the city of Porto Vecchio. As the previous two editions, the race consisted of three stages, with the first two held on the same day. The second stage was a short individual time trial.

The race was won by Jean-Christophe Péraud of Ag2r–La Mondiale, who won the overall classification without winning any stage. Mathias Frank (IAM Cycling) was second in the overall classification and won both the Points and the King of the Mountains classifications, while Tinkoff–Saxo's Rafał Majka finished ahead of the Young Rider classification. Suisse team IAM Cycling won the Teams classification.

== Schedule ==
Stage	Date	Course	Distance	Type	Winner	Ref
1	29 March	Porto-Vecchio – Porto-Vecchio	89 km (55 mi)	Medium-mountain stage	Nacer Bouhanni (FRA)	
2	29 March	Porto-Vecchio – Porto-Vecchio	7 km (4 mi)	Individual time trial	Tom Dumoulin (NED)	
3	30 March	Porto-Vecchio – Col de l'Ospedale	176 km (109 mi)	Mountain stage	Mathias Frank (SUI)	
Total		272 km (169.0 mi)				

== Teams ==
A total of 15 teams took part in the race:

ProTeams

- Ag2r–La Mondiale
- Astana
- Team Europcar
- FDJ.fr
- Garmin–Sharp
- Giant–Shimano
- Tinkoff–Saxo
- Trek Factory Racing

Professional Continental Teams

- Bretagne–Séché Environnement
- Cofidis
- Colombia
- IAM Cycling
- NetApp–Endura

Continental Teams

- BigMat–Auber 93
- Team La Pomme Marseille 13

== Stages ==
=== Stage 1 ===
29 March 2014 — Porto-Vecchio to Porto-Vecchio, 89 km (55.3 mi)

Stage 1 Result

	Rider	Team	Time
1	Nacer Bouhanni (FRA)	FDJ.fr	2h 07' 01"
2	Nathan Haas (AUS)	Garmin–Sharp	s.t.
3	Marko Kump (SLO)	Tinkoff–Saxo	s.t.
4	Tony Hurel (FRA)	Team Europcar	s.t.
5	Julien Simon (FRA)	Cofidis	s.t.
6	Matthias Brändle (AUT)	IAM Cycling	s.t.
7	Benjamin Giraud (FRA)	Team La Pomme Marseille 13	s.t.
8	Armindo Fonseca (FRA)	Bretagne–Séché Environnement	s.t.
9	Eugenio Alafaci (ITA)	Trek Factory Racing	s.t.
10	Julien Bérard (FRA)	Ag2r–La Mondiale	s.t.

General Classification after Stage 1

	Rider	Team	Time
1	Nacer Bouhanni (FRA)	FDJ.fr	2h 06' 55"
2	Nathan Haas (AUS)	Garmin–Sharp	+ 2"
3	Matthias Brändle (AUT)	IAM Cycling	+ 3"
4	Marko Kump (SLO)	Tinkoff–Saxo	+ 4"
5	Bob Jungels (LUX)	Trek Factory Racing	+ 4"
6	Stéphane Rossetto (FRA)	BigMat–Auber 93	+ 5"
7	Tony Hurel (FRA)	Team Europcar	+ 6"
8	Julien Simon (FRA)	Cofidis	+ 6"
9	Benjamin Giraud (FRA)	Team La Pomme Marseille 13	+ 6"
10	Armindo Fonseca (FRA)	Bretagne–Séché Environnement	+ 6"

=== Stage 2 ===
29 March 2014 — Porto-Vecchio, 7 km (4.3 mi), individual time trial (ITT)

Stage 2 Result

	Rider	Team	Time
1	Tom Dumoulin (NED)	Giant–Shimano	9' 07"
2	Rohan Dennis (AUS)	Garmin–Sharp	+ 3"
3	Bob Jungels (LUX)	Trek Factory Racing	+ 10"
4	Jean-Christophe Péraud (FRA)	Ag2r–La Mondiale	+ 11"
5	Jérôme Coppel (FRA)	Cofidis	+ 11"
6	Ramūnas Navardauskas (LTU)	Garmin–Sharp	+ 14"
7	Mathias Frank (SUI)	IAM Cycling	+ 16"
8	Julien Simon (FRA)	Cofidis	+ 16"
9	Eduardo Sepúlveda (ARG)	Bretagne–Séché Environnement	+ 18"
10	Nathan Haas (AUS)	Garmin–Sharp	+ 20"

General Classification after Stage 2

	Rider	Team	Time
1	Tom Dumoulin (NED)	Giant–Shimano	2h 16' 08"
2	Rohan Dennis (AUS)	Garmin–Sharp	+ 3"
3	Bob Jungels (LUX)	Trek Factory Racing	+ 8"
4	Jean-Christophe Péraud (FRA)	Ag2r–La Mondiale	+ 11"
5	Jérôme Coppel (FRA)	Cofidis	+ 11"
6	Ramūnas Navardauskas (LTU)	Garmin–Sharp	+ 14"
7	Nathan Haas (AUS)	Garmin–Sharp	+ 16"
8	Mathias Frank (SUI)	IAM Cycling	+ 16"
9	Julien Simon (FRA)	Cofidis	+ 16"
10	Eduardo Sepúlveda (ARG)	Bretagne–Séché Environnement	+ 18"

=== Stage 3 ===
30 March 2014 — Porto-Vecchio to Col de l'Ospedale, 176 km (109.4 mi)

Stage 3 Result

	Rider	Team	Time
1	Mathias Frank (SUI)	IAM Cycling	4h 43' 59"
2	Jean-Christophe Péraud (FRA)	Ag2r–La Mondiale	s.t.
3	Tiago Machado (POR)	NetApp–Endura	+ 2"
4	Fränk Schleck (LUX)	Trek Factory Racing	+ 3"
5	Rafał Majka (POL)	Tinkoff–Saxo	+ 3"
6	Eduardo Sepúlveda (ARG)	Bretagne–Séché Environnement	+ 13"
7	Alexis Vuillermoz (FRA)	Ag2r–La Mondiale	+ 20"
8	Fabio Duarte (COL)	Colombia	+ 36"
9	Rémy Di Gregorio (FRA)	Team La Pomme Marseille 13	+ 36"
10	Julien Simon (FRA)	Cofidis	+ 36"

Final General Classification

	Rider	Team	Time
1	Jean-Christophe Péraud (FRA)	Ag2r–La Mondiale	7h 00' 12"
2	Mathias Frank (SUI)	IAM Cycling	+ 1"
3	Tiago Machado (POR)	NetApp–Endura	+ 19"
4	Rafał Majka (POL)	Tinkoff–Saxo	+ 25"
5	Eduardo Sepúlveda (ARG)	Bretagne–Séché Environnement	+ 26"
6	Fränk Schleck (LUX)	Trek Factory Racing	+ 28"
7	Julien Simon (FRA)	Cofidis	+ 47"
8	Alexis Vuillermoz (FRA)	Ag2r–La Mondiale	+ 48"
9	Bob Jungels (LUX)	Trek Factory Racing	+ 57"
10	Fabio Duarte (COL)	Colombia	+ 1' 07"

== Classification leadership table ==
Stage	Winner	General classification	Points classification	Mountains classification	Young rider classification	Team Classification
1	Nacer Bouhanni	Nacer Bouhanni	Nacer Bouhanni	Théo Vimpere	Nacer Bouhanni	Team Europcar
2	Tom Dumoulin	Tom Dumoulin	Tom Dumoulin	Théo Vimpere	Tom Dumoulin	Garmin–Sharp
3	Mathias Frank	Jean-Christophe Péraud	Mathias Frank	Mathias Frank	Rafał Majka	IAM Cycling
Final		Jean-Christophe Péraud	Mathias Frank	Mathias Frank	Rafał Majka	IAM Cycling
