= 2014 Tour of the Basque Country =

2014 UCI World Tour, race 9 of 29

Race details
- Dates: 7–12 April 2014
- Stages: 6
- Distance: 840.8 km (522.4 mi)
- Winning time: 21h 09' 11"

Results
Jersey awarded to the overall winner	Winner	Alberto Contador (Spain)	(Tinkoff–Saxo)
	Second	Michał Kwiatkowski (Poland)	(Omega Pharma–Quick-Step)
	Third	Jean-Christophe Péraud (France)	(Ag2r–La Mondiale)
Jersey awarded to the points classification winner	Points	Michał Kwiatkowski (Poland)	(Omega Pharma–Quick-Step)
Jersey awarded to the mountains classification winner	Mountains	Davide Villella (Italy)	(Cannondale)
Jersey awarded to the sprints classification winner	Sprints	Omar Fraile (Spain)	(Caja Rural–Seguros RGA)
	Team	BMC Racing Team	

The 2014 Tour of the Basque Country was the 54th edition of the Tour of the Basque Country. It started on 7 April 2014 in Ordizia and ended on 12 April in Markina-Xemein, and consisted of six stages, including a race-concluding individual time trial. It was the ninth race of the 2014 UCI World Tour season.

The race was won for the third time by Spanish rider Alberto Contador of Tinkoff–Saxo, who won the race's opening stage after a late-stage move and eventually held the overall lead for the rest of the race. Contador won the general classification by 49 seconds over runner-up Michał Kwiatkowski (Omega Pharma–Quick-Step) while Ag2r–La Mondiale's Jean-Christophe Péraud completed the podium, 15 seconds behind Kwiatkowski and 64 seconds down on Contador. Kwiatkowski and Péraud had both started the final stage outside the top three placings, but moved up due to their more proficient performances in the time trial.

With five third-place finishes from the six stages, Kwiatkowski was also the winner of the white jersey for the points classification, taking the lead on the final stage from the Movistar Team's Alejandro Valverde; Valverde also dropped from second to fifth overall in the general classification. Cannondale rider Davide Villella was the winner of the mountains classification, having held that lead from start to finish, while the sprints classification was won for the second year in a row by a rider from the wildcard team Caja Rural–Seguros RGA; Omar Fraile won the classification, after Amets Txurruka had done so in 2013. The teams classification was won by BMC Racing Team, with three of their riders finishing in the top 15 overall.

== Teams ==
As the Tour of the Basque Country was a UCI World Tour event, all 18 UCI ProTeams were invited automatically and obligated to send a squad. Only Caja Rural–Seguros RGA was given a wildcard place, thus completing the 19-team peloton.

The 19 teams that competed in the race were:

- Ag2r–La Mondiale
- Astana
- Belkin Pro Cycling
- BMC Racing Team
- Cannondale
- Caja Rural–Seguros RGA
- Team Europcar
- FDJ.fr
- Garmin–Sharp
- Giant–Shimano
- Team Katusha
- Lampre–Merida
- Lotto–Belisol
- Movistar Team
- Omega Pharma–Quick-Step
- Orica–GreenEDGE
- Team Sky
- Trek Factory Racing

== Stages ==
=== Stage 1 ===
7 April 2014 — Ordizia to Ordizia, 153.4 km (95.3 mi)

Stage 1 Result and General Classification after Stage 1

	Rider	Team	Time
1	Alberto Contador (ESP)	Tinkoff–Saxo	4h 05' 07"
2	Alejandro Valverde (ESP)	Movistar Team	+ 14"
3	Michał Kwiatkowski (POL)	Omega Pharma–Quick-Step	+ 34"
4	Yuri Trofimov (RUS)	Team Katusha	+ 36"
5	Damiano Cunego (ITA)	Lampre–Merida	+ 36"
6	Jean-Christophe Péraud (FRA)	Ag2r–La Mondiale	+ 36"
7	Mikel Nieve (ESP)	Team Sky	+ 36"
8	Cadel Evans (AUS)	BMC Racing Team	+ 36"
9	Roman Kreuziger (CZE)	Tinkoff–Saxo	+ 54"
10	Mikel Landa (ESP)	Astana	+ 54"

=== Stage 2 ===
8 April 2014 — Ordizia to Urdazubi, 155.8 km (96.8 mi)

Stage 2 Result

	Rider	Team	Time
1	Tony Martin (GER)	Omega Pharma–Quick-Step	3h 46' 17"
2	Ben Swift (GBR)	Team Sky	+ 30"
3	Michał Kwiatkowski (POL)	Omega Pharma–Quick-Step	+ 30"
4	Damiano Cunego (ITA)	Lampre–Merida	+ 30"
5	Paul Martens (GER)	Belkin Pro Cycling	+ 30"
6	Alejandro Valverde (ESP)	Movistar Team	+ 30"
7	Maxim Iglinsky (KAZ)	Astana	+ 30"
8	Yukiya Arashiro (JPN)	Team Europcar	+ 30"
9	Michael Matthews (AUS)	Orica–GreenEDGE	+ 30"
10	Rinaldo Nocentini (ITA)	Ag2r–La Mondiale	+ 30"

General Classification after Stage 2

	Rider	Team	Time
1	Alberto Contador (ESP)	Tinkoff–Saxo	7h 51' 54"
2	Alejandro Valverde (ESP)	Movistar Team	+ 14"
3	Michał Kwiatkowski (POL)	Omega Pharma–Quick-Step	+ 34"
4	Damiano Cunego (ITA)	Lampre–Merida	+ 36"
5	Cadel Evans (AUS)	BMC Racing Team	+ 36"
6	Jean-Christophe Péraud (FRA)	Ag2r–La Mondiale	+ 36"
7	Mikel Nieve (ESP)	Team Sky	+ 36"
8	Yuri Trofimov (RUS)	Team Katusha	+ 36"
9	Roman Kreuziger (CZE)	Tinkoff–Saxo	+ 54"
10	Mikel Landa (ESP)	Astana	+ 54"

=== Stage 3 ===
9 April 2014 — Urdazubi to Vitoria-Gasteiz, 194.5 km (120.9 mi)

Stage 3 Result

	Rider	Team	Time
1	Michael Matthews (AUS)	Orica–GreenEDGE	5h 02' 09"
2	Kévin Reza (FRA)	Team Europcar	s.t.
3	Michał Kwiatkowski (POL)	Omega Pharma–Quick-Step	s.t.
4	Ben Swift (GBR)	Team Sky	s.t.
5	Paul Martens (GER)	Belkin Pro Cycling	s.t.
6	Yukiya Arashiro (JPN)	Team Europcar	s.t.
7	Daniele Ratto (ITA)	Cannondale	s.t.
8	Maxim Iglinsky (KAZ)	Astana	s.t.
9	Enrico Gasparotto (ITA)	Astana	s.t.
10	Tosh Van der Sande (BEL)	Lotto–Belisol	s.t.

General Classification after Stage 3

	Rider	Team	Time
1	Alberto Contador (ESP)	Tinkoff–Saxo	12h 54' 03"
2	Alejandro Valverde (ESP)	Movistar Team	+ 14"
3	Michał Kwiatkowski (POL)	Omega Pharma–Quick-Step	+ 34"
4	Damiano Cunego (ITA)	Lampre–Merida	+ 36"
5	Cadel Evans (AUS)	BMC Racing Team	+ 36"
6	Jean-Christophe Péraud (FRA)	Ag2r–La Mondiale	+ 36"
7	Yuri Trofimov (RUS)	Team Katusha	+ 36"
8	Mikel Nieve (ESP)	Team Sky	+ 36"
9	Roman Kreuziger (CZE)	Tinkoff–Saxo	+ 54"
10	Mikel Landa (ESP)	Astana	+ 54"

=== Stage 4 ===
10 April 2014 — Vitoria-Gasteiz to Eibar, 151 km (93.8 mi)

Stage 4 Result

	Rider	Team	Time
1	Wout Poels (NED)	Omega Pharma–Quick-Step	3h 39' 29"
2	Alejandro Valverde (ESP)	Movistar Team	+ 1"
3	Samuel Sánchez (ESP)	BMC Racing Team	+ 1"
4	Tom-Jelte Slagter (NED)	Garmin–Sharp	+ 3"
5	Bauke Mollema (NED)	Belkin Pro Cycling	+ 3"
6	Yuri Trofimov (RUS)	Team Katusha	+ 3"
7	Cadel Evans (AUS)	BMC Racing Team	+ 3"
8	Mikel Landa (ESP)	Astana	+ 3"
9	Damiano Cunego (ITA)	Lampre–Merida	+ 3"
10	Alberto Contador (ESP)	Tinkoff–Saxo	+ 3"

General Classification after Stage 4

	Rider	Team	Time
1	Alberto Contador (ESP)	Tinkoff–Saxo	16h 33' 35"
2	Alejandro Valverde (ESP)	Movistar Team	+ 12"
3	Damiano Cunego (ITA)	Lampre–Merida	+ 36"
4	Cadel Evans (AUS)	BMC Racing Team	+ 36"
5	Jean-Christophe Péraud (FRA)	Ag2r–La Mondiale	+ 36"
6	Yuri Trofimov (RUS)	Team Katusha	+ 36"
7	Michał Kwiatkowski (POL)	Omega Pharma–Quick-Step	+ 41"
8	Mikel Landa (ESP)	Astana	+ 54"
9	Wout Poels (NED)	Omega Pharma–Quick-Step	+ 55"
10	Samuel Sánchez (ESP)	BMC Racing Team	+ 56"

=== Stage 5 ===
11 April 2014 — Eibar to Xemein, 160.2 km (99.5 mi)

Stage 5 Result

	Rider	Team	Time
1	Ben Swift (GBR)	Team Sky	3h 56' 56"
2	Alejandro Valverde (ESP)	Movistar Team	s.t.
3	Michał Kwiatkowski (POL)	Omega Pharma–Quick-Step	s.t.
4	Tom-Jelte Slagter (NED)	Garmin–Sharp	s.t.
5	Damiano Cunego (ITA)	Lampre–Merida	s.t.
6	Cyril Gautier (FRA)	Team Europcar	s.t.
7	Jonathan Hivert (FRA)	Belkin Pro Cycling	s.t.
8	Jean-Christophe Péraud (FRA)	Ag2r–La Mondiale	s.t.
9	Alberto Contador (ESP)	Tinkoff–Saxo	s.t.
10	Cadel Evans (AUS)	BMC Racing Team	s.t.

General Classification after Stage 5

	Rider	Team	Time
1	Alberto Contador (ESP)	Tinkoff–Saxo	20h 30' 31"
2	Alejandro Valverde (ESP)	Movistar Team	+ 12"
3	Damiano Cunego (ITA)	Lampre–Merida	+ 36"
4	Cadel Evans (AUS)	BMC Racing Team	+ 36"
5	Jean-Christophe Péraud (FRA)	Ag2r–La Mondiale	+ 36"
6	Yuri Trofimov (RUS)	Team Katusha	+ 36"
7	Michał Kwiatkowski (POL)	Omega Pharma–Quick-Step	+ 41"
8	Mikel Landa (ESP)	Astana	+ 54"
9	Wout Poels (NED)	Omega Pharma–Quick-Step	+ 55"
10	Samuel Sánchez (ESP)	BMC Racing Team	+ 56"

=== Stage 6 ===
12 April 2014 — Xemein, 25.9 km (16.1 mi), individual time trial (ITT)

Stage 6 Result

	Rider	Team	Time
1	Tony Martin (GER)	Omega Pharma–Quick-Step	38' 33"
2	Alberto Contador (ESP)	Tinkoff–Saxo	+ 7"
3	Michał Kwiatkowski (POL)	Omega Pharma–Quick-Step	+ 15"
4	Simon Špilak (SLO)	Team Katusha	+ 16"
5	Jean-Christophe Péraud (FRA)	Ag2r–La Mondiale	+ 35"
6	Tom Dumoulin (NED)	Giant–Shimano	+ 38"
7	Jon Izagirre (ESP)	Movistar Team	+ 41"
8	Alejandro Valverde (ESP)	Movistar Team	+ 1' 02"
9	Tejay van Garderen (USA)	BMC Racing Team	+ 1' 05"
10	Thibaut Pinot (FRA)	FDJ.fr	+ 1' 25"

Final General Classification

	Rider	Team	Time
1	Alberto Contador (ESP)	Tinkoff–Saxo	21h 09' 11"
2	Michał Kwiatkowski (POL)	Omega Pharma–Quick-Step	+ 49"
3	Jean-Christophe Péraud (FRA)	Ag2r–La Mondiale	+ 1' 04"
4	Simon Špilak (SLO)	Team Katusha	+ 1' 07"
5	Alejandro Valverde (ESP)	Movistar Team	+ 1' 07"
6	Tejay van Garderen (USA)	BMC Racing Team	+ 1' 56"
7	Cadel Evans (AUS)	BMC Racing Team	+ 1' 56"
8	Yuri Trofimov (RUS)	Team Katusha	+ 2' 13"
9	Thibaut Pinot (FRA)	FDJ.fr	+ 2' 14"
10	Wout Poels (NED)	Omega Pharma–Quick-Step	+ 2' 26"

== Classification leadership table ==
In the 2014 Tour of the Basque Country, four different jerseys were awarded. For the general classification, calculated by adding each cyclist's finishing times on each stage, the leader received a yellow jersey. This classification was considered the most important of the 2014 Tour of the Basque Country, and the winner of the classification was the winner of the race.

Additionally, there was a points classification, which awarded a white jersey. In the points classification, cyclists received points for finishing in the top 15 in a stage. For winning a stage, a rider earned 25 points, second place earned 20 points, third 16, fourth 14, fifth 12, sixth 10, and one point fewer per place down to a single point for 15th. There was also a mountains classification, the leadership of which was marked by a red jersey with white dots. In the mountains classification, points were won by reaching the top of a climb before other cyclists, with more points available for the higher-categorised climbs.

The fourth jersey represented the sprints classification, marked by a blue jersey. In the sprints classification, cyclists received points for finishing in the top 3 at intermediate sprint points during each stage, with the exception of the final individual time trial stage. There was also a classification for teams, in which the times of the best three cyclists per team on each stage were added together; the leading team at the end of the race was the team with the lowest total time.

Stage	Winner	General classification	Points classification	Mountains classification	Sprints classification	Teams classification
1	Alberto Contador	Alberto Contador	Alberto Contador	Davide Villella	Matteo Montaguti	BMC Racing Team
2	Tony Martin	Alberto Contador	Michał Kwiatkowski	Davide Villella	Matteo Montaguti	BMC Racing Team
3	Michael Matthews	Alberto Contador	Michał Kwiatkowski	Davide Villella	Matteo Montaguti	BMC Racing Team
4	Wout Poels	Alberto Contador	Alejandro Valverde	Davide Villella	Omar Fraile	BMC Racing Team
5	Ben Swift	Alberto Contador	Alejandro Valverde	Davide Villella	Omar Fraile	BMC Racing Team
6	Tony Martin	Alberto Contador	Michał Kwiatkowski	Davide Villella	Omar Fraile	BMC Racing Team
Final		Alberto Contador	Michał Kwiatkowski	Davide Villella	Omar Fraile	BMC Racing Team
