= 2014 Strade Bianche =

2014 UCI Europe Tour
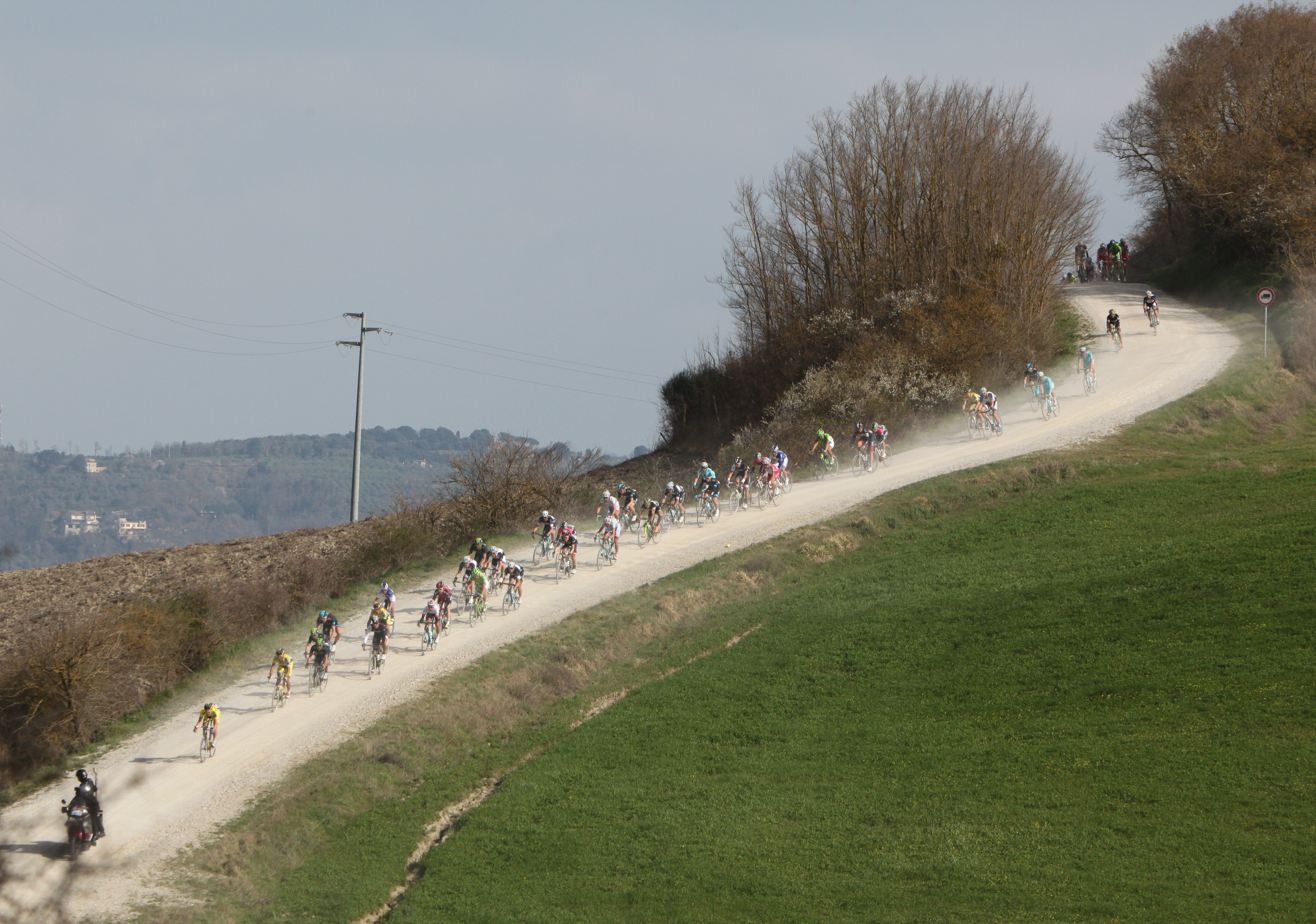
- Peloton during the 2014 Strade Bianche

Race details
- Dates: March 8
- Stages: 1
- Distance: 197 km (122.4 mi)
- Winning time: 5h 20' 33"

Results
	Winner	Michał Kwiatkowski (Poland)	(Omega Pharma–Quick-Step)
	Second	Peter Sagan (Slovakia)	(Cannondale)
	Third	Alejandro Valverde (Spain)	(Movistar Team)

The eighth edition of the Strade Bianche cycling race was held on 8 March 2014. The race started in San Gimignano and finished on the Piazza del Campo in Siena's city centre.

The event was won by Poland's Michał Kwiatkowski of Omega Pharma–Quick-Step. Kwiatkowski had broken clear with Peter Sagan with 21 km remaining. The duo had built a winning lead, and Kwiatkowski distanced his breakaway companion with less than 500m to go on the steep finishing road in the centre of Siena. Sagan was unable to answer the Pole's attack and finished 19 seconds behind Kwiatkowski.

Spaniard Alejandro Valverde set off in pursuit, but was unable to catch the leaders and finished third at 36 seconds from Kwiatkowski. Damiano Cunego and Roman Kreuziger rounded out the top-five.

== Teams ==
The start list included 18 teams – 11 ProTeams and 7 Professional Continental Teams – and a total of 144 riders.

- Astana
- BMC Racing Team
- Cannondale
- Lampre–Merida
- Movistar Team
- Omega Pharma–Quick-Step
- Giant–Shimano
- Team Katusha
- Team Sky
- Tinkoff–Saxo
- Trek Factory Racing
- Androni Giocattoli–Venezuela
- Bardiani–CSF
- Colombia
- IAM Cycling
- MTN–Qhubeka
- UnitedHealthcare
- Neri Sottoli

== Results ==
	Cyclist	Team	Time
1	Michał Kwiatkowski (POL)	Omega Pharma–Quick-Step	5h 20' 33"
2	Peter Sagan (SVK)	Cannondale	+ 19"
3	Alejandro Valverde (ESP)	Movistar Team	+ 36"
4	Damiano Cunego (ITA)	Lampre–Merida	+ 40"
5	Roman Kreuziger (CZE)	Tinkoff–Saxo	+ 40"
6	Fabian Cancellara (SUI)	Trek Factory Racing	+ 59"
7	Cadel Evans (AUS)	BMC Racing Team	+ 1' 44"
8	Warren Barguil (FRA)	Giant–Shimano	+ 2' 02"
9	Wout Poels (NED)	Omega Pharma–Quick-Step	+ 2' 11"
10	Simon Geschke (GER)	Giant–Shimano	+ 2' 51"
