= Jean-Christophe Péraud =

French racing cyclist

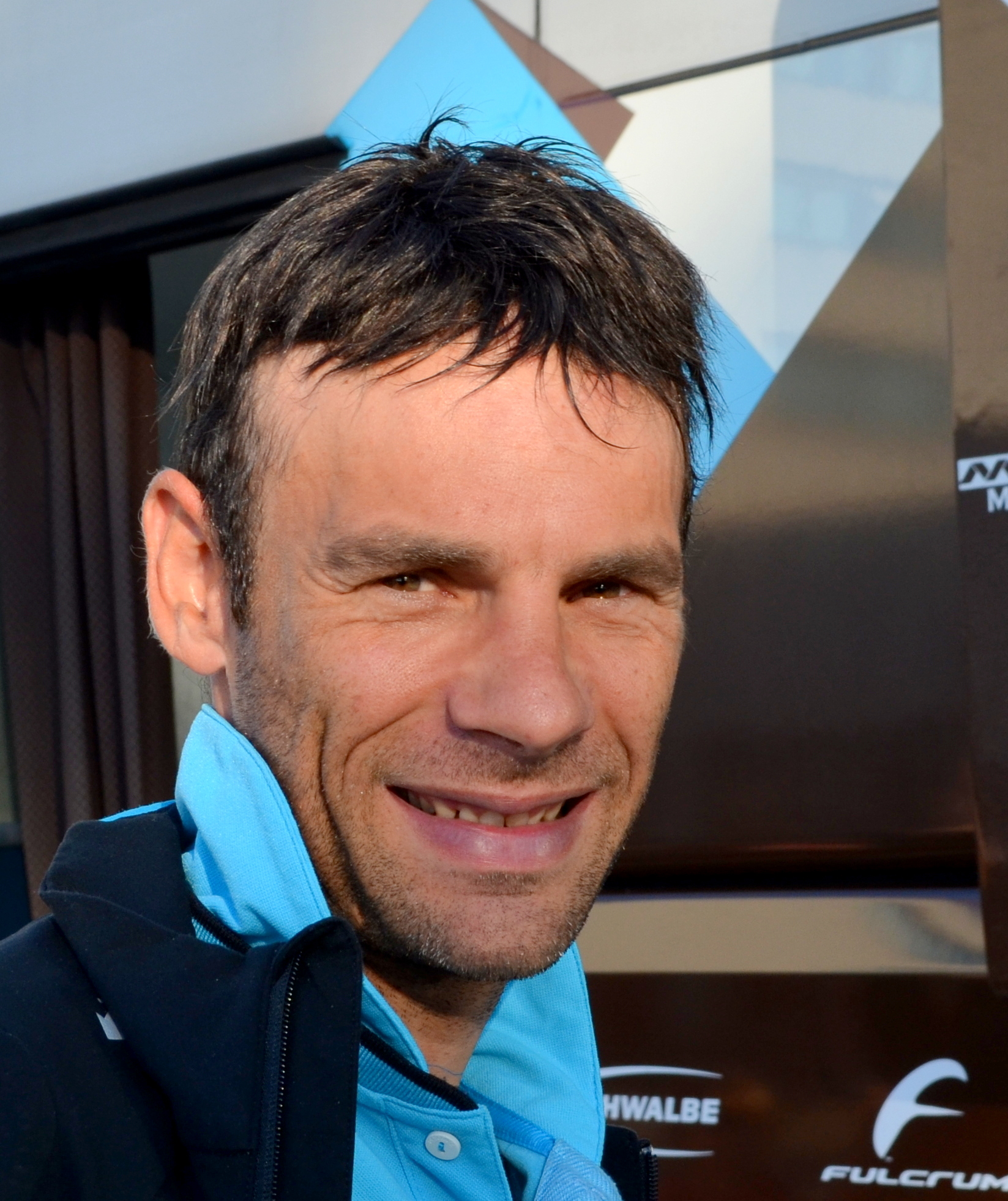
- Peraud at the 2014 Tour de l'Ain

Personal information
- Born: 22 May 1977 (age 49) Toulouse, France
- Height: 1.72 m (5 ft 7 1/2 in)
- Weight: 62 kg (137 lb; 9 st 11 lb)

Cycling career
- Sport: Cycling
- Current team: Retired
- Disciplines: Mountain bike; Road
- Role: Rider

Amateur teams
- 1999–2005: SCO Dijon
- 2006–2009: Creusot Cycling

Professional teams
- 2010: Omega Pharma–Lotto
- 2011–2016: Ag2r–La Mondiale

Major wins
- Mountain bike European XC Championships (2005) Road Stage races Critérium International (2014, 2015) One-day races and Classics National Time Trial Championships (2009)
Medal record
Representing France
Men's mountain bike racing
Olympic Games
Silver medal – second place	2008 Beijing	Men's cross-country
European Championships
Gold medal – first place	2005 Kluisbergen	Cross-country

Jean-Christophe Péraud (born 22 May 1977) is a retired French cyclist who rode for Omega Pharma–Lotto and AG2R La Mondiale during his professional career. He was a member of the French team at the 2008 and 2012 Summer Olympics.

== Career ==
Péraud was European cross-country champion in 2005 and world team champion in 2008. Competing at the 2008 Summer Olympics in Beijing he won the silver medal in the cross-country race. In June 2009 he became the surprise winner of the French National Time Trial Championships. This led to him being signed by UCI ProTour team Omega Pharma–Lotto for the 2010 season, to increase its time-trialing presence in stage races.

In 2011, Péraud achieved 6th place overall at the Critérium International and ninth place overall in the Tour de France. He crashed out in the final week of the 2013 Tour de France during the time trial, falling in a slippery late-apex corner, in the same spot his family had gathered to cheer him on, with less than two kilometers to go, riding with a non-displaced fractured collarbone sustained in a prior crash the very same morning. Péraud had again been placed ninth on the general classification before the incident. According to cyclingnews.com, Péraud responded in a composed manner concerning the incident:

"I didn't feel that I was taking too many risks, I was descending as I know how but I was surprised by the corner. It's part of sport. I'm okay and it's only a broken collarbone. It will be a relief to get home, and we'll think about my next objective when my body recovers."

In 2014, Péraud won the Critérium International in March. He also recorded top-five finishes in Tirreno–Adriatico, the Volta ao Algarve, and the Tour of the Basque Country. Péraud followed this up with a strong performance in the Tour de France, where he finished in second place in the final general classification, behind Vincenzo Nibali and ahead of Thibaut Pinot. He and Pinot became the first Frenchmen to finish in the top three overall in the Tour de France since Richard Virenque finished as runner-up overall in 1997. It was the first time in 30 years that two Frenchmen finished in the top three overall in the Tour de France – Laurent Fignon (winner) and Bernard Hinault (runner-up) finished in the top two overall in 1984.

In 2015, Péraud repeated his victory on the 2.HC Critérium International by winning the last stage finishing atop the Col de l'Ospedale. He won the general classification with a gap of ten seconds to fellow Frenchman Thibaut Pinot. Following his victory, Péraud stated "At the start, I thought that I would help Alexis Vuillermoz. But I attacked and I found myself alone. This victory is important after hard times and two surgeries this winter."

== Major results ==
=== Mountain bike ===
2003
1st Roc d'Azur
2005
1st Cross-country, UEC European Championships
2nd Cross-country, National Championships
2007
1st Roc d'Azur
3rd Cross-country, National Championships
2008
1st Team relay, UCI World Championships
1st Team relay, UEC European Championships
2nd Cross-country, Olympic Games
2nd Cross-country, National Championships
UCI Cross-country World Cup

3rd Madrid

2009
UCI Cross-country World Cup

3rd Offenburg

=== Road ===
2006
1st Les Boucles du Sud-Ardèche
2008
1st Road race, National Amateur Championships
2009
1st Time trial, National Championships
2nd Chrono des Nations
2010
4th Overall Tour of the Basque Country
9th Overall Paris–Nice
2011
2nd Overall Tour Méditerranéen
4th Overall Tour du Poitou-Charentes
6th Overall Paris–Nice
6th Overall Critérium International
7th Overall Critérium du Dauphiné
7th Overall Tour of Beijing
8th Overall Tour de l'Ain
9th Overall Tour de France
10th Tour du Doubs
2012
4th Overall Tour du Poitou-Charentes
7th Overall Tour of the Basque Country
2013
2nd Overall Tour Méditerranéen

1st Stage 4

3rd Overall Paris–Nice
5th Overall Critérium International
6th Overall Tour de Romandie
2014
1st Overall Critérium International
2nd Overall Tour de France
2nd Overall Tour Méditerranéen

1st Stage 5

3rd Overall Tour of the Basque Country
4th Overall Tirreno–Adriatico
5th Overall Tour de l'Ain
10th UCI World Tour
2015
1st Overall Critérium International

1st Stage 3

8th Boucles de l'Aulne
2016
9th Overall Giro del Trentino

==== General classification results timeline ====
Grand Tour general classification results
Grand Tour	2010	2011	2012	2013	2014	2015	2016
Giro d'Italia	—	—	—	—	—	—	DNF
Tour de France	—	9	44	DNF	2	61	—
Vuelta a España	39	—	—	—	—	—	13
Major stage race general classification results
Race	2010	2011	2012	2013	2014	2015	2016
Paris–Nice	8	6	90	3	—	DNF	—
Tirreno–Adriatico	—	—	—	—	4	—	24
Volta a Catalunya	Did not contest during career						
Tour of the Basque Country	4	60	7	17	3	16	—
Tour de Romandie	DNF	40	96	6	32	31	—
Critérium du Dauphiné	DNF	7	68	—	37	31	—
Tour de Suisse	—	—	—	13	—	—	56

Legend
—	Did not compete
DNF	Did not finish
