= Clément Saint-Martin =

French cyclist

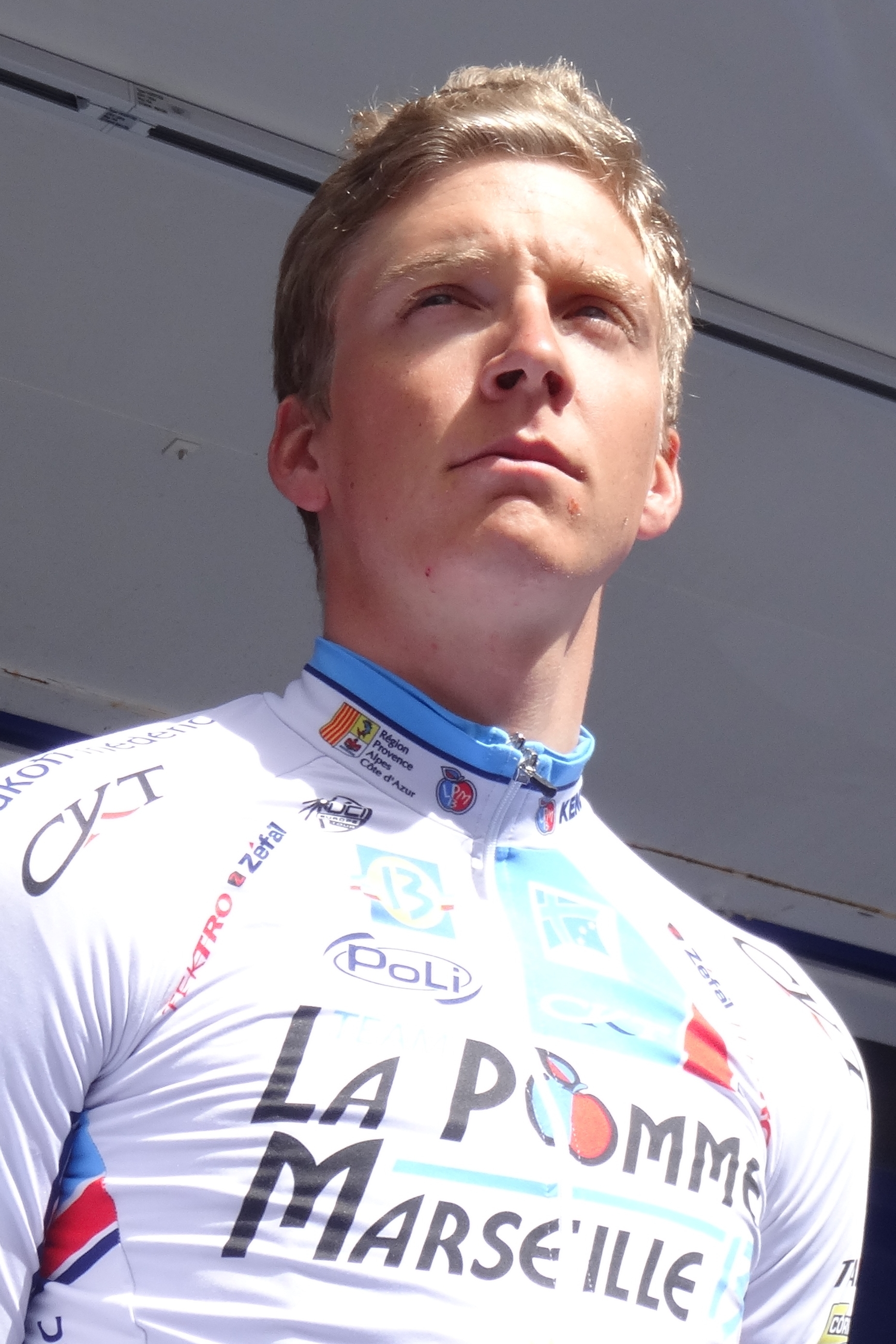
- Saint-Martin in 2014

Personal information
- Full name: Clément Saint-Martin
- Born: 16 August 1991 (age 35) Gruchet-le-Valasse, France
- Height: 1.83 m (6 ft 0 in)
- Weight: 66 kg (146 lb)

Cycling career
- Sport: Cycling
- Current team: Pro Immo Nicolas Roux
- Discipline: Road
- Role: Rider

Amateur teams
- 2010: CS Gravenchon
- 2011–2012: USSA Pavilly Barentin
- 2013: TC Châteaubernard
- 2013: Oceane U–Top 16
- 2016–2018: Océane Top 16
- 2019: VC Rouen 76
- 2020–: Pro Immo Nicolas Roux

Professional teams
- 2013: La Pomme Marseille (stagiaire)
- 2014–2015: Team La Pomme Marseille 13

Clément Saint-Martin (born 16 August 1991 in Gruchet-le-Valasse) is a French cyclist, who currently rides for French amateur team Pro Immo Nicolas Roux.

== Major results ==
2012
1st Vienne Classic Espoirs
2013
1st Grand Prix de la ville de Buxerolles
2014
1st Mountains classification Ronde de l'Oise
8th Grand Prix de Plumelec-Morbihan
8th Tour du Jura
2019
10th Overall Tour de Normandie
10th Grand Prix des Marbriers
