= Clément Koretzky =

French cyclist

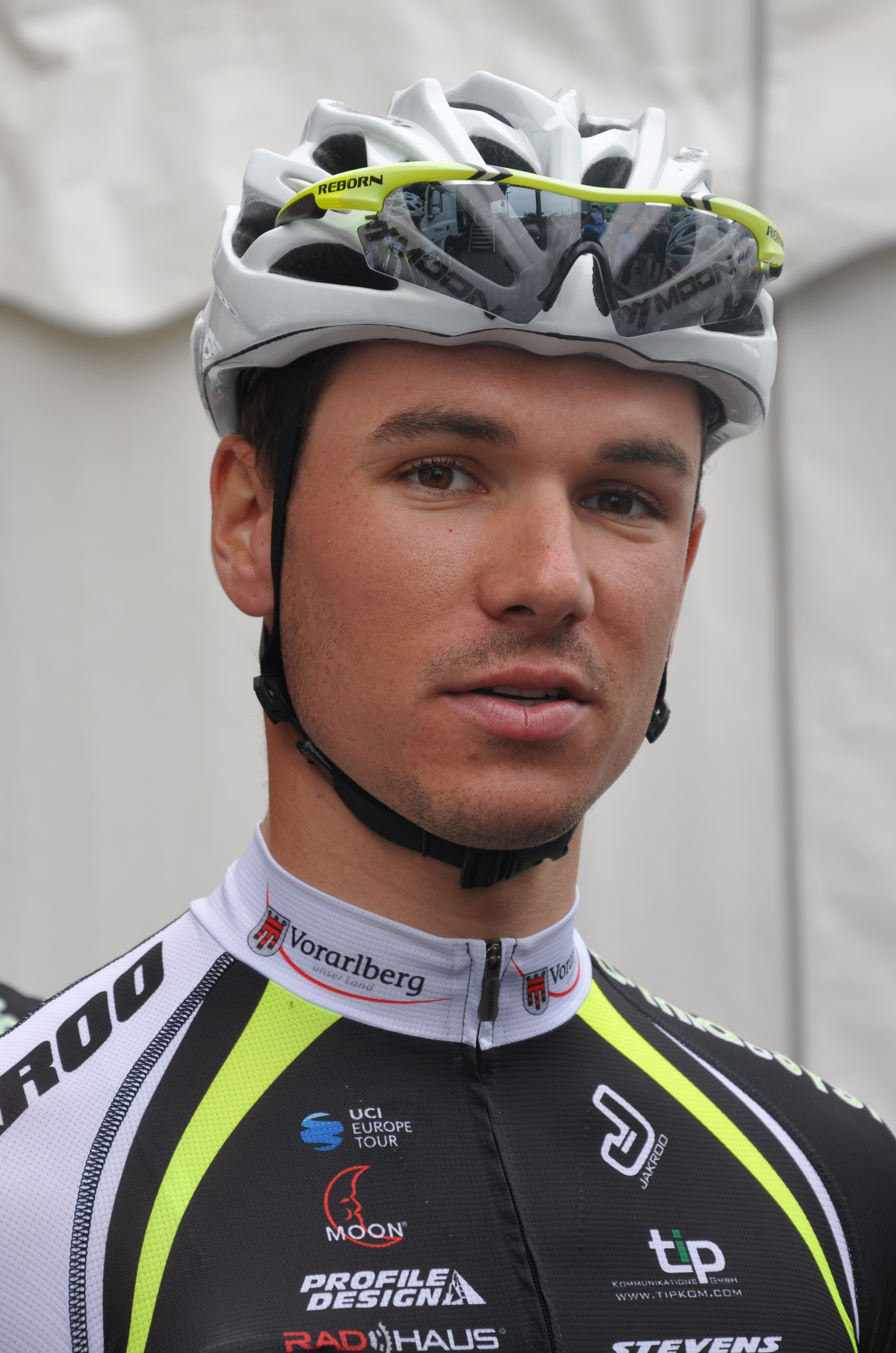
- Koretzky in 2016

Personal information
- Born: October 30, 1990 (age 35) Miramas, France

Cycling career
- Sport: Cycling
- Current team: Retired
- Disciplines: Road; Cyclo-cross
- Role: Rider
- Rider type: Puncheur; Sprinter

Amateur teams
- 2007–2009: Vélo-Club La Pomme Marseille
- 2010: VS Narbonnais
- 2011: AVC Aix-en-Provence
- 2017: Charvieu-Chavagneux IC

Professional teams
- 2012: La Pomme Marseille
- 2013–2014: Bretagne–Séché Environnement
- 2015–2016: Team Vorarlberg

Clément Koretzky (born October 30, 1990, in Miramas) is a French former professional cyclist.

== Major results ==
2008
2nd Junior race, National Cyclo-cross Championships
2011
1st GP Christian Fenioux
1st Grand Prix de Bras
1st Stage 2 Vuelta a la Comunidad de Madrid U23
1st Stage 1 Giro della Valle d'Aosta
1st Stage 3 Tour du Pays Roannais
2012
1st Étoile d'or
2nd Grand Prix de la Somme
7th Grand Prix de Plumelec-Morbihan
2013
5th Overall Tour du Gévaudan Languedoc-Roussillon
5th Val d'Ille Classic
2014
1st Mountains classification Étoile de Bessèges
4th Route Adélie
6th Ronde van Drenthe
2015
1st Mountains classification Boucles de la Mayenne
5th Tour de Berne
9th Horizon Park Race for Peace
2016
7th Overall Tour du Loir-et-Cher
