= 2014 Garmin–Sharp season =

Garmin–Sharp
- 2014 season
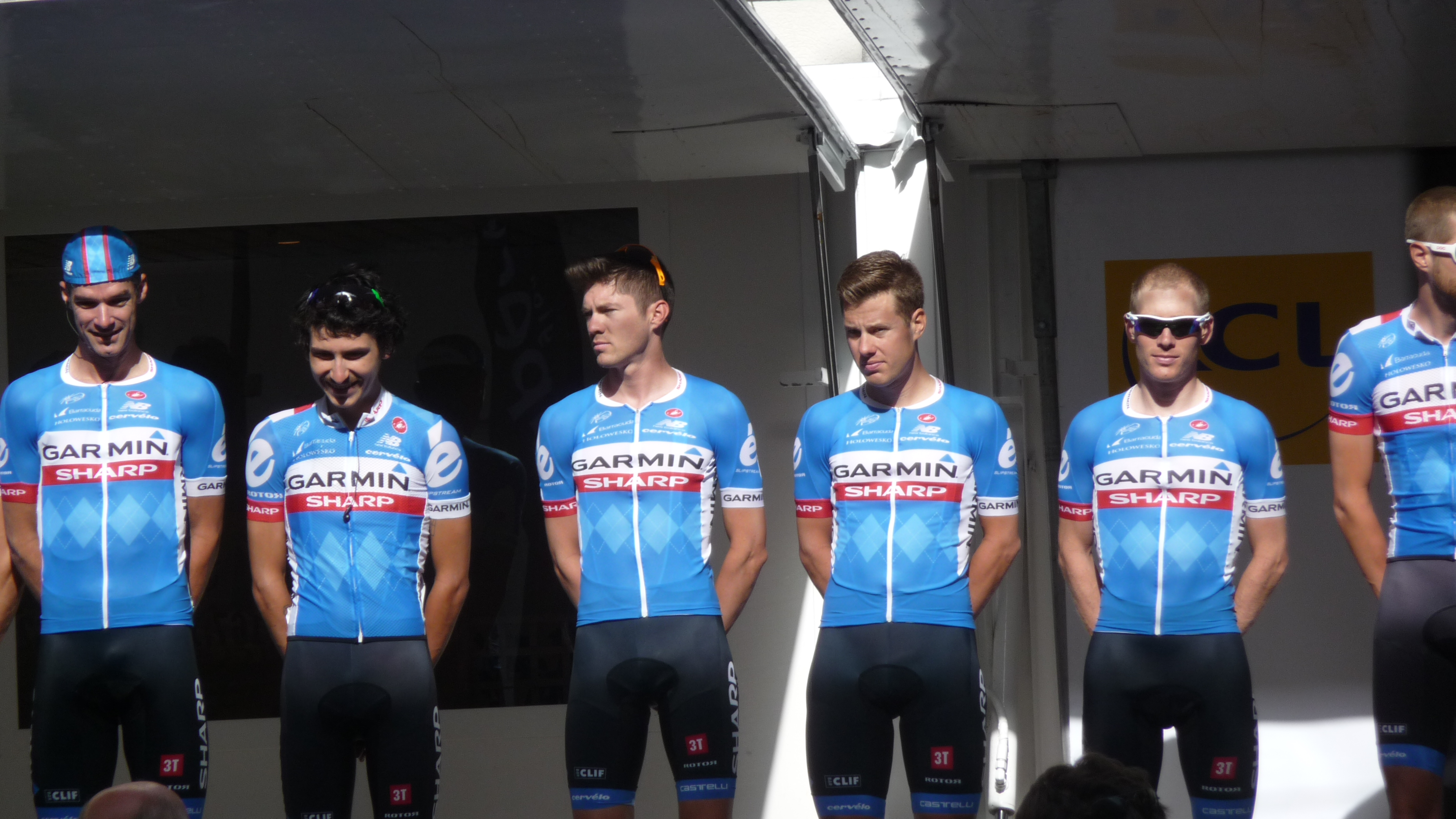
- The team at the 2014 Critérium du Dauphiné
- UCI code: GRS
- Status: UCI ProTeam
- World Tour Rank: 11th (807 points)
- Manager: Jonathan Vaughters
- Main sponsor(s): Garmin & Sharp
- Based: Boulder, Colorado, USA
- Bicycles: Cervélo
- Groupset: Shimano

Season victories
- One-day races: 4
- Stage race overall: 4
- Stage race stages: 15
- National Championships: 3
- Best ranked rider: Dan Martin (9th)

The 2014 season for the Garmin–Sharp cycling team began in January at the Tour de San Luis. As a UCI ProTeam, they were obligated to send a squad to every event in the UCI World Tour.

== Team roster ==
As of January 1, 2014.

Rider	Date of birth
Janier Acevedo (COL)	December 6, 1985 (aged 28)
Jack Bauer (NZL)	April 7, 1985 (aged 28)
Nate Brown (USA)	July 6, 1991 (aged 22)
André Cardoso (POR)	September 3, 1984 (aged 29)
Tom Danielson (USA)	March 13, 1978 (aged 35)
Thomas Dekker (NED)	September 6, 1984 (aged 29)
Rohan Dennis (AUS)	May 28, 1990 (aged 23)
Caleb Fairly (USA)	February 19, 1987 (aged 26)
Tyler Farrar (USA)	June 2, 1984 (aged 29)
Koldo Fernández (ESP)	September 13, 1981 (aged 32)
Phil Gaimon (USA)	January 28, 1986 (aged 27)
Nathan Haas (AUS)	March 12, 1989 (aged 24)
Ryder Hesjedal (CAN)	December 9, 1980 (aged 33)
Alex Howes (USA)	January 1, 1988 (aged 26)
Ben King (USA)	March 22, 1989 (aged 24)

Rider	Date of birth
Raymond Kreder (NED)	November 26, 1989 (aged 24)
Sebastian Langeveld (NED)	January 17, 1985 (aged 28)
Dan Martin (IRE)	August 20, 1986 (aged 27)
David Millar (GBR)	January 4, 1977 (aged 36)
Lachlan Morton (AUS)	January 2, 1992 (aged 21)
Ramūnas Navardauskas (LTU)	January 30, 1988 (aged 25)
Lasse Norman Hansen (DEN)	February 11, 1992 (aged 21)
Nick Nuyens (BEL)	May 5, 1980 (aged 33)
Tom-Jelte Slagter (NED)	July 1, 1989 (aged 24)
Andrew Talansky (USA)	November 23, 1988 (aged 25)
Dylan van Baarle (NED)	May 22, 1993 (aged 20)
Johan Vansummeren (BEL)	February 4, 1981 (aged 32)
Steele Von Hoff (AUS)	December 31, 1987 (aged 26)
Fabian Wegmann (GER)	June 20, 1980 (aged 33)

Riders who joined the team for the 2014 season

Rider	2013 team
Janier Acevedo	neo-pro (Jamis–Hagens Berman)
Nate Brown	neo-pro (Bontrager Cycling Team)
André Cardoso	Caja Rural–Seguros RGA
Phil Gaimon	neo-pro (Bissell)
Lasse Norman Hansen	neo-pro (Blue Water Cycling)
Ben King	RadioShack–Leopard
Sebastian Langeveld	Orica–GreenEDGE
Tom-Jelte Slagter	Belkin Pro Cycling
Dylan van Baarle	Rabobank Development Team

Riders who left the team during or after the 2013 season

Rider	2014 team
Robert Hunter	Retired
Andreas Klier	Retired
Michel Kreder	Wanty–Groupe Gobert
Martijn Maaskant	UnitedHealthcare
Alex Rasmussen	Riwal Cycling Team
Jacob Rathe	Jelly Belly–Maxxis
Sébastien Rosseler	Veranclassic-Doltcini
Peter Stetina	BMC Racing Team
Christian Vande Velde	Retired
David Zabriskie	Retired

== Season victories ==
Date	Race	Competition	Rider	Country	Location
January 4	Tour de Vineyards, Stage 5	National event	Jack Bauer (NZL)	New Zealand	Richmond
January 11	Egmond-pier-Egmond	National event	Sebastian Langeveld (NED)	Netherlands	Egmond aan Zee
January 20	Tour de San Luis, Stage 1	UCI America Tour	Phil Gaimon (USA)	Argentina	Villa Mercedes
February 5	Herald Sun Tour, Prologue	UCI Oceania Tour	Jack Bauer (NZL)	Australia	Melbourne
February 6	Herald Sun Tour, Stage 1	UCI Oceania Tour	Nathan Haas (AUS)	Australia	Ballarat
March 12	Paris–Nice, Stage 4	UCI World Tour	Tom-Jelte Slagter (NED)	France	Belleville
March 15	Paris–Nice, Stage 7	UCI World Tour	Tom-Jelte Slagter (NED)	France	Biot–Sophia Antipolis
March 30	Volta a Catalunya, Teams classification	UCI World Tour	(Note: The riders on the squad were Janier Acevedo, Nate Brown, Tom Danielson, Dan Martin, Koldo Fernández, Phil Gaimon, Ryder Hesjedal and Andrew Talansky.)	Spain	
April 10	Circuit de la Sarthe, Stage 4	UCI Europe Tour	Ramūnas Navardauskas (LTU)	France	Pré-en-Pail
April 11	Circuit de la Sarthe, Overall	UCI Europe Tour	Ramūnas Navardauskas (LTU)	France	
April 11	Circuit de la Sarthe, Young rider classification	UCI Europe Tour	Rohan Dennis (AUS)	France	
April 11	Circuit de la Sarthe, Teams classification	UCI Europe Tour	(Note: The riders on the squad were Nate Brown, Thomas Dekker, Rohan Dennis, Phil Gaimon, Nathan Haas, Ramūnas Navardauskas.)	France	
May 13	Tour of California, Stage 3	UCI America Tour	Rohan Dennis (AUS)	United States	Mount Diablo
May 18	Tour of California, Teams classification	UCI America Tour	(Note: The riders on the squad were Janier Acevedo, Nate Brown, Tom Danielson, Rohan Dennis, Caleb Fairly, Phil Gaimon, Alex Howes and Ben King.)	United States	
May 18	ProRace Berlin	UCI Europe Tour	Raymond Kreder (NED)	Germany	Berlin
June 15	Critérium du Dauphiné, Overall	UCI World Tour	Andrew Talansky (USA)	France	
June 22	Ster ZLM Toer, Points classification	UCI Europe Tour	Tyler Farrar (USA)	Netherlands	
June 22	Ster ZLM Toer, Teams classification	UCI Europe Tour	(Note: The riders on the squad were Thomas Dekker, Tyler Farrar, Lasse Norman Hansen, Raymond Kreder, Nick Nuyens, Dylan van Baarle and Steele Von Hoff.)	Netherlands	
July 25	Tour de France, Stage 19	UCI World Tour	Ramūnas Navardauskas (LTU)	France	Bergerac
August 7	Tour of Utah, Stage 4	UCI America Tour	Tom Danielson (USA)	United States	Powder Mountain
August 10	Tour of Utah, Overall	UCI America Tour	Tom Danielson (USA)	United States	
August 13	Tour de l'Ain, Stage 1	UCI Europe Tour	Raymond Kreder (NED)	France	Montrevel-en-Bresse
August 17	Eneco Tour, Teams classification	UCI World Tour	(Note: The riders on the squad were Jack Bauer, Tyler Farrar, Nathan Haas, Sebastian Langeveld, David Millar, Ramūnas Navardauskas, Nick Nuyens and Dylan van Baarle.)	Belgium; Netherlands	
August 24	USA Pro Cycling Challenge, Stage 7	UCI America Tour	Alex Howes (USA)	United States	Denver
September 6	Vuelta a España, Stage 14	UCI World Tour	Ryder Hesjedal (CAN)	Spain	La Camperona, Valle de Sábero
September 7	Tour of Alberta, Points classification	UCI America Tour	Ramūnas Navardauskas (LTU)	Canada	
September 7	Tour of Alberta, Teams classification	UCI America Tour	(Note: The riders on the squad were Tom Danielson, Caleb Fairly, Phil Gaimon, Gavin Mannion, Ramūnas Navardauskas, Ben King, Steele Von Hoff and Fabian Wegmann.)	Canada	
September 14	Tour of Britain, Overall	UCI Europe Tour	Dylan van Baarle (NED)	United Kingdom	
October 5	Giro di Lombardia	UCI World Tour	Dan Martin (IRL)	Italy	Bergamo
October 12	Tour of Beijing, Stage 3	UCI World Tour	Tyler Farrar (USA)	China	Yanqing Temple
October 13	Tour of Beijing, Stage 4	UCI World Tour	Dan Martin (IRL)	China	Mount Miaofeng
October 14	Tour of Beijing, Points classification	UCI World Tour	Tyler Farrar (USA)	China	
October 19	Japan Cup	UCI Asia Tour	Nathan Haas (AUS)	Japan	Utsunomiya
