= 2014 Giant–Shimano season =

Giant–Shimano
- 2014 season
- Manager: Iwan Spekenbrink

Season victories
- One-day races: 5
- Stage race overall: 1
- Stage race stages: 34

The 2014 season for the Giant–Shimano began in January with the Tour Down Under. As a UCI ProTeam, they were automatically invited and obligated to send a squad to every event in the UCI World Tour.

After Argos Oil withdrew sponsorship from the team at the end of the 2013 season, Taiwanese bicycle manufacturer Giant Bicycles took over main naming rights for the 2014 season.

== Team roster ==
As of 1 January 2014.

Rider	Date of birth
Jonas Ahlstrand (SWE)	16 February 1990 (aged 23)
Nikias Arndt (GER)	18 November 1991 (aged 22)
Brian Bulgaç (Note: Bulgaç joined the team on April 28.) (NED)	7 April 1988 (aged 25)
Warren Barguil (FRA)	28 October 1991 (aged 22)
Lawson Craddock (USA)	20 February 1992 (aged 21)
Roy Curvers (NED)	27 December 1979 (aged 34)
Thomas Damuseau (FRA)	18 March 1989 (aged 24)
Bert De Backer (BEL)	2 April 1984 (aged 29)
Koen de Kort (NED)	8 September 1982 (aged 31)
John Degenkolb (GER)	7 January 1989 (aged 24)
Dries Devenyns (BEL)	22 July 1983 (aged 30)
Tom Dumoulin (NED)	11 November 1990 (aged 23)
Johannes Fröhlinger (GER)	9 June 1985 (aged 28)
Simon Geschke (GER)	13 March 1986 (aged 27)
Chad Haga (USA)	26 August 1988 (aged 25)

Rider	Date of birth
Thierry Hupond (FRA)	10 November 1984 (aged 29)
Reinardt Janse van Rensburg (RSA)	3 February 1989 (aged 24)
Ji Cheng (CHN)	15 July 1987 (aged 26)
Marcel Kittel (GER)	11 May 1988 (aged 25)
Loh Sea Keong (MYS)	2 November 1986 (aged 27)
Tobias Ludvigsson (SWE)	22 February 1991 (aged 22)
Luka Mezgec (SLO)	27 June 1988 (aged 25)
Daan Olivier (NED)	24 November 1992 (aged 21)
Tom Peterson (USA)	24 December 1986 (aged 27)
Georg Preidler (AUT)	17 June 1990 (aged 23)
Ramon Sinkeldam (NED)	9 February 1989 (aged 24)
Matthieu Sprick (FRA)	29 September 1981 (aged 32)
Tom Stamsnijder (NED)	15 May 1985 (aged 28)
Albert Timmer (NED)	13 June 1985 (aged 28)
Tom Veelers (NED)	14 September 1984 (aged 29)

Riders who joined the team for the 2014 season

Rider	2013 team
Lawson Craddock	neo-pro (Bontrager Cycling Team)
Dries Devenyns	Omega Pharma–Quick-Step
Chad Haga	neo-pro (Optum–Kelly Benefit Strategies)
Loh Sea Keong	neo-pro (OCBC Singapore)
Daan Olivier	neo-pro (Rabobank Development Team)

Riders who left the team during or after the 2013 season

Rider	2014 team
Will Clarke	Drapac Professional Cycling
Patrick Gretsch	Ag2r–La Mondiale
Yann Huguet	Retired
François Parisien	Retired
Xing Yan Dong	

== Season victories ==
Date	Race	Competition	Rider	Country	Location
6 February	Dubai Tour, Stage 2	UCI Asia Tour	Marcel Kittel (GER)	United Arab Emirates	The Palm
7 February	Dubai Tour, Stage 3	UCI Asia Tour	Marcel Kittel (GER)	United Arab Emirates	Hatta
8 February	Dubai Tour, Stage 4	UCI Asia Tour	Marcel Kittel (GER)	United Arab Emirates	Burj Khalifa
8 February	Dubai Tour, Points classification	UCI Asia Tour	Marcel Kittel (GER)	United Arab Emirates	
9 February	Étoile de Bessèges, Stage 5	UCI Europe Tour	Tobias Ludvigsson (SWE)	France	Alès
9 February	Étoile de Bessèges, Overall	UCI Europe Tour	Tobias Ludvigsson (SWE)	France	
9 February	Étoile de Bessèges, Points classification	UCI Europe Tour	John Degenkolb (GER)	France	
9 February	Étoile de Bessèges, Young rider classification	UCI Europe Tour	Tobias Ludvigsson (SWE)	France	
9 February	Étoile de Bessèges, Teams classification	UCI Europe Tour	(Note: The riders on the squad were Tobias Ludvigsson, Jonas Ahlstrand, Roy Curvers, John Degenkolb, Dries Devenyns, Chad Haga, Tom Stamsnijder and Albert Timmer)	France	
13 February	Tour Méditerranéen, Stage 1	UCI Europe Tour	John Degenkolb (GER)	France	Montagnac
14 February	Tour Méditerranéen, Stage 2	UCI Europe Tour	John Degenkolb (GER)	France	Rousset
15 February	Tour Méditerranéen, Stage 3	UCI Europe Tour	John Degenkolb (GER)	France	Saint-Rémy-de-Provence
16 February	Tour Méditerranéen, Points classification	UCI Europe Tour	John Degenkolb (GER)	France	
11 March	Paris–Nice, Stage 3	UCI World Tour	John Degenkolb (GER)	France	Circuit de Nevers Magny-Cours
16 March	Paris–Nice, Points classification	UCI World Tour	John Degenkolb (GER)	France	
21 March	Handzame Classic	UCI Europe Tour	Luka Mezgec (SLO)	Belgium	Handzame
24 March	Volta a Catalunya, Stage 1	UCI World Tour	Luka Mezgec (SLO)	Spain	Calella
25 March	Volta a Catalunya, Stage 2	UCI World Tour	Luka Mezgec (SLO)	Spain	Girona
28 March	Volta a Catalunya, Stage 5	UCI World Tour	Luka Mezgec (SLO)	Spain	Valls
29 March	Critérium International, Stage 2	UCI Europe Tour	Tom Dumoulin (NED)	France	Porto-Vecchio
30 March	Gent–Wevelgem	UCI World Tour	John Degenkolb (GER)	Belgium	Wevelgem
9 April	Circuit de la Sarthe, Stage 2	UCI Europe Tour	Jonas Ahlstrand (SWE)	France	Angers
9 April	Scheldeprijs	UCI Europe Tour	Marcel Kittel (GER)	Belgium	Schoten
10 May	Four Days of Dunkirk, Stage 4	UCI Europe Tour	Thierry Hupond (FRA)	France	Licques
10 May	Giro d'Italia, Stage 2	UCI World Tour	Marcel Kittel (GER)	United Kingdom	Belfast
11 May	Giro d'Italia, Stage 3	UCI World Tour	Marcel Kittel (GER)	Ireland	Dublin
18 May	Tour of California, Young rider classification	UCI America Tour	Lawson Craddock (USA)	United States	
25 May	World Ports Classic, Stage 2	UCI Europe Tour	Ramon Sinkeldam (NED)	Netherlands	Rotterdam
25 May	World Ports Classic, Young rider classification	UCI Europe Tour	Ramon Sinkeldam (NED)	(Note: Race held in Belgium and the Netherlands.)	
1 June	Tour of Belgium, Young rider classification	UCI Europe Tour	Tom Dumoulin (NED)	Belgium	
1 June	Giro d'Italia, Stage 21	UCI World Tour	Luka Mezgec (SLO)	Italy	Trieste
10 June	Critérium du Dauphiné, Stage 3	UCI World Tour	Nikias Arndt (GER)	France	Le Teil
12 June	GP du canton d'Argovie	UCI Europe Tour	Simon Geschke (GER)	Switzerland	Gippingen
19 June	Ster ZLM Toer, Stage 1	UCI Europe Tour	Marcel Kittel (GER)	Netherlands	Sint Willebrord
5 July	Tour de France, Stage 1	UCI World Tour	Marcel Kittel (GER)	United Kingdom	Harrogate
7 July	Tour de France, Stage 3	UCI World Tour	Marcel Kittel (GER)	United Kingdom	London
8 July	Tour de France, Stage 4	UCI World Tour	Marcel Kittel (GER)	France	Lille
27 July	Tour de France, Stage 21	UCI World Tour	Marcel Kittel (GER)	France	Paris
13 August	Eneco Tour, Stage 3	UCI World Tour	Tom Dumoulin (NED)	Netherlands	Breda
17 August	Eneco Tour, Points classification	UCI World Tour	Tom Dumoulin (NED)		
17 August	Vuelta a Burgos, Young rider classification	UCI Europe Tour	Daan Olivier (NED)	Spain	
26 August	Vuelta a España, Stage 4	UCI World Tour	John Degenkolb (GER)	Spain	Córdoba
27 August	Vuelta a España, Stage 5	UCI World Tour	John Degenkolb (GER)	Spain	Ronda
2 September	Tour of Alberta, Prologue	UCI America Tour	Tom Dumoulin (NED)	Canada	Calgary
4 September	Vuelta a España, Stage 12	UCI World Tour	John Degenkolb (GER)	Spain	Logroño
4 September	Tour of Alberta, Stage 2	UCI America Tour	Jonas Ahlstrand (SWE)	Canada	Red Deer
7 September	Tour of Britain, Stage 1	UCI Europe Tour	Marcel Kittel (GER)	United Kingdom	Liverpool
7 September	Tour of Alberta, Young rider classification	UCI America Tour	Tom Dumoulin (NED)	Canada	
10 September	Vuelta a España, Stage 17	UCI World Tour	John Degenkolb (GER)	Spain	A Coruña
14 September	Tour of Britain, Stage 8b	UCI Europe Tour	Marcel Kittel (GER)	United Kingdom	London
14 September	Vuelta a España, Points classification	UCI World Tour	John Degenkolb (GER)	Spain	
9 October	Paris–Bourges	UCI Europe Tour	John Degenkolb (GER)	France	Bourges
10 October	Tour of Beijing, Stage 1	UCI World Tour	Luka Mezgec (SLO)	China	Zhangjiakou
