= 2014 Trek Factory Racing season =

Trek Factory Racing
- 2014 season
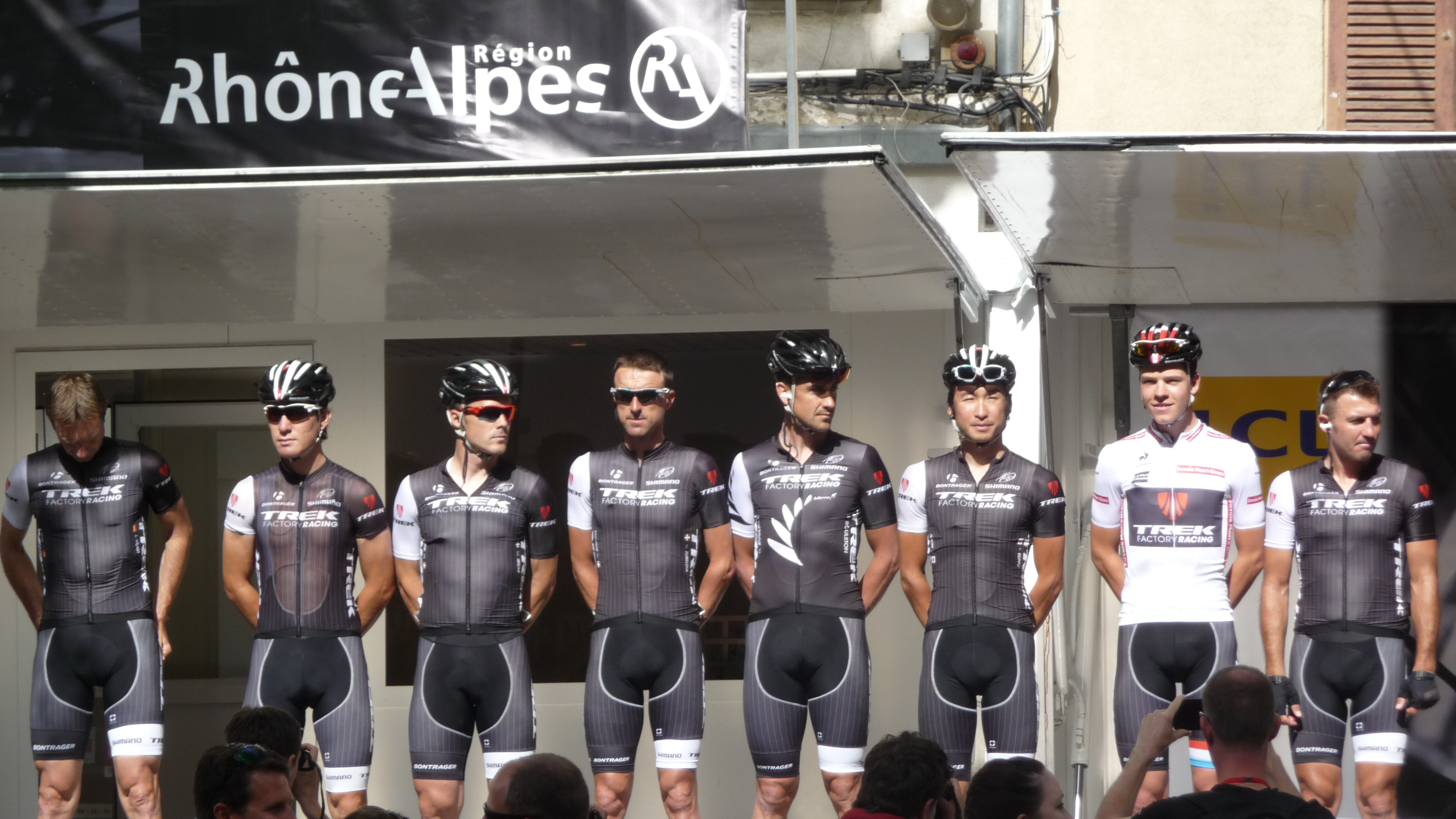
- Départ 2e étape 2014 – Tarare
- Manager: Luca Guercilena

Season victories
- One-day races: 1
- Stage race overall: –
- Stage race stages: 10
- Jersey

The 2014 season for the Trek Factory Racing cycling team began in January at the Tour de San Luis. As a UCI ProTeam, they were automatically invited and obligated to send a squad to every event in the UCI World Tour.

On June 26, 2013, Trek Bicycle announced that it has reached an agreement with the current owner of the RadioShack team, Leopard SA, to take over its WorldTour license and ownership of the squad in 2014.

== Team roster ==
As of January 1, 2014.

Rider	Date of birth
Eugenio Alafaci (ITA)	August 9, 1990 (aged 23)
Julián Arredondo (COL)	July 30, 1988 (aged 25)
Fumiyuki Beppu (JPN)	April 10, 1983 (aged 30)
Matthew Busche (USA)	May 9, 1985 (aged 28)
Fabian Cancellara (SUI)	March 18, 1981 (aged 32)
Stijn Devolder (BEL)	August 29, 1979 (aged 34)
Laurent Didier (LUX)	July 19, 1984 (aged 29)
Fabio Felline (ITA)	March 29, 1990 (aged 23)
Danilo Hondo (GER)	January 4, 1974 (aged 39)
Markel Irizar (ESP)	February 5, 1980 (aged 33)
Bob Jungels (LUX)	September 22, 1992 (aged 21)
Robert Kišerlovski (CRO)	August 9, 1986 (aged 27)
Giacomo Nizzolo (ITA)	January 30, 1989 (aged 24)
Yaroslav Popovych (UKR)	January 4, 1980 (aged 33)

Rider	Date of birth
Grégory Rast (SUI)	January 17, 1980 (aged 33)
Hayden Roulston (NZL)	January 10, 1981 (aged 32)
Andy Schleck (LUX)	June 10, 1985 (aged 28)
Fränk Schleck (LUX)	April 15, 1980 (aged 33)
Jesse Sergent (NZL)	July 8, 1988 (aged 25)
Fábio Silvestre (POR)	January 25, 1990 (aged 23)
Jasper Stuyven (BEL)	April 17, 1992 (aged 21)
Boy van Poppel (NED)	January 18, 1988 (aged 25)
Danny van Poppel (NED)	July 26, 1993 (aged 20)
Kristof Vandewalle (BEL)	April 5, 1985 (aged 28)
Jens Voigt (GER)	September 17, 1971 (aged 42)
Calvin Watson (AUS)	January 6, 1993 (aged 20)
Riccardo Zoidl (AUT)	April 8, 1988 (aged 25)
Haimar Zubeldia (ESP)	April 1, 1977 (aged 36)

Riders who joined the team for the 2014 season

Rider	2013 team
Eugenio Alafaci	neo-pro (Leopard–Trek Continental Team)
Julián Arredondo	neo-pro (Team Nippo–De Rosa)
Fumiyuki Beppu	Orica–GreenEDGE
Fabio Felline	Androni Giocattoli–Venezuela
Fränk Schleck	ex-pro (RadioShack–Nissan, 2012)
Fábio Silvestre	neo-pro (Leopard–Trek Continental Team)
Jasper Stuyven	neo-pro (Bontrager Cycling Team)
Kristof Vandewalle	Omega Pharma–Quick-Step
Boy van Poppel	Vacansoleil–DCM
Danny van Poppel	Vacansoleil–DCM
Calvin Watson	neo-pro (Food Italia)
Riccardo Zoidl	neo-pro (Gourmetfein–Simplon)

Riders who left the team during or after the 2013 season

Rider	2014 team
Jan Bakelants	Omega Pharma–Quick-Step
George Bennett	Cannondale
Tony Gallopin	Lotto–Belisol
Ben Hermans	BMC Racing Team
Chris Horner	Lampre–Merida
Ben King	Garmin–Sharp
Andreas Klöden	Retired
Tiago Machado	NetApp–Endura
Maxime Monfort	Lotto–Belisol
Nelson Oliveira	Lampre–Merida
Thomas Rohregger	Retired

== Season victories ==
Date	Race	Competition	Rider	Country	Location
January 21	Tour de San Luis, Stage 2	UCI America Tour	Julián Arredondo (COL)	Argentina	Potrero de Los Funes
January 22	Tour de San Luis, Stage 3	UCI America Tour	Giacomo Nizzolo (ITA)	Argentina	Juana Koslay
January 25	Tour de San Luis, Stage 6	UCI America Tour	Julián Arredondo (COL)	Argentina	Mirador del Sol
March 8	Driedaagse van West-Vlaanderen, Stage 1	UCI Europe Tour	Danny van Poppel (NED)	Belgium	Harelbeke
March 9	Driedaagse van West-Vlaanderen, Teams classification	UCI Europe Tour	(Note: The riders on the squad were Kristof Vandewalle, Stijn Devolder, Jasper Stuyven, Jesse Sergent, Fábio Silvestre, Boy van Poppel, Danny van Poppel and Fumiyuki Beppu)	Belgium	
April 6	Tour of Flanders	UCI World Tour	Fabian Cancellara (SUI)	Belgium	Oudenaarde
May 29	Giro d'Italia, Stage 18	UCI World Tour	Julián Arredondo (COL)	Italy	Rifugio Panarotta
June 1	Giro d'Italia, Mountains classification	UCI World Tour	Julián Arredondo (COL)	Italy	
June 1	Giro d'Italia, Combativity classification	UCI World Tour	Julián Arredondo (COL)	Italy	
June 4	Tour de Luxembourg, Prologue	UCI Europe Tour	Danny van Poppel (NED)	Luxembourg	Luxembourg City
July 10	Tour of Austria, Stage 5	UCI Europe Tour	Jesse Sergent (NZL)	Austria	St Johann im Pongau
July 12	Tour of Austria, Stage 7	UCI Europe Tour	Kristof Vandewalle (BEL)	Austria	Podersdorf
July 27	Tour de Wallonie, Stage 2	UCI Europe Tour	Giacomo Nizzolo (ITA)	Belgium	Perwez
August 9	Tour de Pologne, Stage 7	UCI World Tour	Kristof Vandewalle (BEL)	Poland	Kraków
August 22	USA Pro Cycling Challenge, Stage 5	UCI America Tour	Laurent Didier (LUX)	United States	Breckenridge, Colorado
