= 2014 Movistar Team season =

Movistar Team
- 2014 season
- Manager: Eusebio Unzué

Season victories
- One-day races: 6
- Stage race overall: 4
- Stage race stages: 20

The 2014 season for Movistar Team began in January at the Tour de San Luis. As a UCI ProTeam, they were automatically invited and obligated to send a squad to every event in the UCI World Tour.

== 2014 roster ==
As of 1 January 2014.

Rider	Date of birth
Andrey Amador (CRC)	29 August 1986 (aged 27)
Igor Antón (ESP)	2 March 1983 (aged 30)
Eros Capecchi (ITA)	13 June 1986 (aged 27)
Jonathan Castroviejo (ESP)	27 April 1987 (aged 26)
Alex Dowsett (GBR)	3 October 1988 (aged 25)
Imanol Erviti (ESP)	15 November 1983 (aged 30)
John Gadret (FRA)	22 April 1979 (aged 34)
Iván Gutiérrez (ESP)	27 November 1978 (aged 35)
Jesús Herrada (ESP)	26 July 1990 (aged 23)
José Herrada (ESP)	1 October 1985 (aged 28)
Beñat Intxausti (ESP)	20 March 1986 (aged 27)
Gorka Izagirre (ESP)	7 October 1987 (aged 26)
Ion Izagirre (ESP)	4 February 1988 (aged 25)
Pablo Lastras (ESP)	20 January 1976 (aged 37)

Rider	Date of birth
Juan José Lobato (ESP)	28 December 1988 (aged 25)
Adriano Malori (ITA)	28 January 1988 (aged 25)
Javier Moreno (ESP)	18 July 1984 (aged 29)
Rubén Plaza (ESP)	29 February 1980 (aged 33)
Dayer Quintana (COL)	10 August 1992 (aged 21)
Nairo Quintana (COL)	4 February 1990 (aged 23)
José Joaquín Rojas (ESP)	8 June 1985 (aged 28)
Enrique Sanz (ESP)	11 September 1989 (aged 24)
Jasha Sütterlin (GER)	4 November 1992 (aged 21)
Sylwester Szmyd (POL)	2 March 1978 (aged 35)
Alejandro Valverde (ESP)	25 April 1980 (aged 33)
Francisco Ventoso (ESP)	6 May 1982 (aged 31)
Giovanni Visconti (ITA)	13 January 1983 (aged 30)

Riders who joined the team for the 2014 season

Rider	2013 team
Igor Antón	Euskaltel–Euskadi
John Gadret	Ag2r–La Mondiale
Gorka Izagirre	Euskaltel–Euskadi
Jon Izagirre	Euskaltel–Euskadi
Juan José Lobato	Euskaltel–Euskadi
Adriano Malori	Lampre–Merida
Dayer Quintana	neo-pro (Lizarte)
Jasha Sütterlin	neo-pro (Thüringer Energie)

Riders who left the team during or after the 2013 season

Rider	2014 team
Juan José Cobo	Torku Şekerspor
Rui Costa	Lampre–Merida
Vladimir Karpets	
Ángel Madrazo	Caja Rural–Seguros RGA
Argiro Ospina	
Eloy Teruel	Jamis–Hagens Berman

== Season victories ==
Date	Race	Competition	Rider	Country	Location
23 January	Tour de San Luis, Stage 4	UCI America Tour	Nairo Quintana (COL)	Argentina	Alto del Amago
24 January	Tour de San Luis, Stage 5	UCI America Tour	Adriano Malori (ITA)	Argentina	San Luis
26 January	Tour de San Luis, Overall	UCI America Tour	Nairo Quintana (COL)	Argentina	
26 January	Tour de San Luis, Mountains classification	UCI America Tour	Nairo Quintana (COL)	Argentina	
19 February	Vuelta a Andalucía, Prologue	UCI Europe Tour	Alejandro Valverde (ESP)	Spain	Almería
20 February	Vuelta a Andalucía, Stage 1	UCI Europe Tour	Alejandro Valverde (ESP)	Spain	Jaén
21 February	Vuelta a Andalucía, Stage 2	UCI Europe Tour	Alejandro Valverde (ESP)	Spain	Cabra
23 February	Vuelta a Andalucía, Overall	UCI Europe Tour	Alejandro Valverde (ESP)	Spain	
23 February	Vuelta a Andalucía, Points classification	UCI Europe Tour	Alejandro Valverde (ESP)	Spain	
23 February	Vuelta a Andalucía, Combination classification	UCI Europe Tour	Alejandro Valverde (ESP)	Spain	
1 March	Vuelta a Murcia	UCI Europe Tour	Alejandro Valverde (ESP)	Spain	Lorca
9 March	Roma Maxima	UCI Europe Tour	Alejandro Valverde (ESP)	Italy	Rome
16 March	Paris–Nice, Teams classification	UCI World Tour	(Note: The riders on the squad were Jon Izagirre, Imanol Erviti, John Gadret, Iván Gutiérrez, Jesús Herrada, Gorka Izagirre, José Joaquín Rojas and Sylwester Szmyd)	France	
18 March	Tirreno–Adriatico, Stage 7	UCI World Tour	Adriano Malori (ITA)	Italy	San Benedetto del Tronto
18 March	Tirreno–Adriatico, Young rider classification	UCI World Tour	Nairo Quintana (COL)	Italy	
5 April	GP Miguel Induráin	UCI Europe Tour	Alejandro Valverde (ESP)	Spain	Estella
9 April	Circuit de la Sarthe, Stage 3	UCI Europe Tour	Alex Dowsett (GBR)	France	Angers
23 April	La Flèche Wallonne	UCI World Tour	Alejandro Valverde (ESP)	Belgium	Huy
4 May	Tour de Romandie, Young rider classification	UCI World Tour	Jesús Herrada (ESP)	Switzerland	
4 May	Tour de Romandie, Teams classification	UCI World Tour	(Note: The riders on the squad were Jonathan Castroviejo, Jesús Herrada, Beñat Intxausti, Jon Izagirre, Pablo Lastras, Juan José Lobato, Sylwester Szmyd and Giovanni Visconti)	Switzerland	
16 May	Vuelta a Castilla y León, Stage 1	UCI Europe Tour	José Joaquín Rojas (ESP)	Spain	Zamora
18 May	Vuelta a Castilla y León, Points classification	UCI Europe Tour	José Joaquín Rojas (ESP)	Spain	
27 May	Giro d'Italia, Stage 16	UCI World Tour	Nairo Quintana (COL)	Italy	Val Martello–Martelltal
30 May	Giro d'Italia, Stage 19	UCI World Tour	Nairo Quintana (COL)	Italy	Cima Grappa
1 June	Giro d'Italia, Overall	UCI World Tour	Nairo Quintana (COL)	Italy	
1 June	Giro d'Italia, Young rider classification	UCI World Tour	Nairo Quintana (COL)	Italy	
20 June	Route du Sud, Stage 1	UCI Europe Tour	Jesús Herrada (ESP)	France	Payolle
22 June	Route du Sud, Stage 3	UCI Europe Tour	Adriano Malori (ITA)	France	Castres
22 June	Route du Sud, Points classification	UCI Europe Tour	Adriano Malori (ITA)	France	
8 July	Tour of Austria, Stage 3	UCI Europe Tour	Dayer Quintana (COL)	Austria	Kitzbüheler Horn
13 July	Tour of Austria, Teams classification	UCI Europe Tour	(Note: The riders on the squad were Eros Capecchi, Juan José Lobato, Pablo Lastras, Javier Moreno, Dayer Quintana, Francisco Ventoso, Jasha Sütterlin and Sylwester Szmyd)	Austria	
25 July	Prueba Villafranca de Ordizia	UCI Europe Tour	Gorka Izagirre (ESP)	Spain	Ordizia
28 July	Tour de Wallonie, Stage 3	UCI Europe Tour	Juan José Lobato (ESP)	Belgium	Neufchâteau, Liège
2 August	Clásica de San Sebastián	UCI World Tour	Alejandro Valverde (ESP)	Spain	San Sebastián
9 August	Tour de Pologne, Teams classification	UCI World Tour	(Note: The riders on the squad were Andrey Amador, Eros Capecchi, Beñat Intxausti, Gorka Izagirre, Ion Izagirre, Juan José Lobato, Adriano Malori and Sylwester Szmyd)	Poland	
13 August	Vuelta a Burgos, Stage 1	UCI Europe Tour	Juan José Lobato (ESP)	Spain	Burgos
15 August	Vuelta a Burgos, Stage 3	UCI Europe Tour	Nairo Quintana (COL)	Spain	Lagunas de Neila
17 August	Vuelta a Burgos, Overall	UCI Europe Tour	Nairo Quintana (COL)	Spain	
17 August	Vuelta a Burgos, Mountains classification	UCI Europe Tour	Nairo Quintana (COL)	Spain	
23 August	Vuelta a España, Stage 1	UCI World Tour	Team time trial (Note: The riders on the squad were Alejandro Valverde, Andrey Amador, Jonathan Castroviejo, Imanol Erviti, José Herrada, Gorka Izagirre, Adriano Malori, Javier Moreno and Nairo Quintana)	Spain	Jerez de la Frontera
28 August	Vuelta a España, Stage 6	UCI World Tour	Alejandro Valverde (ESP)	Spain	La Zubia
29 August	Tour du Poitou-Charentes, Stage 5	UCI Europe Tour	Jesús Herrada (ESP)	France	Poitiers
29 August	Tour du Poitou-Charentes, Young rider classification	UCI Europe Tour	Jesús Herrada (ESP)	France	
14 September	Vuelta a España, Stage 21	UCI World Tour	Adriano Malori (ITA)	Spain	Santiago de Compostela
