= 2014 Orica–GreenEDGE season =

Orica–GreenEDGE
- 2014 season
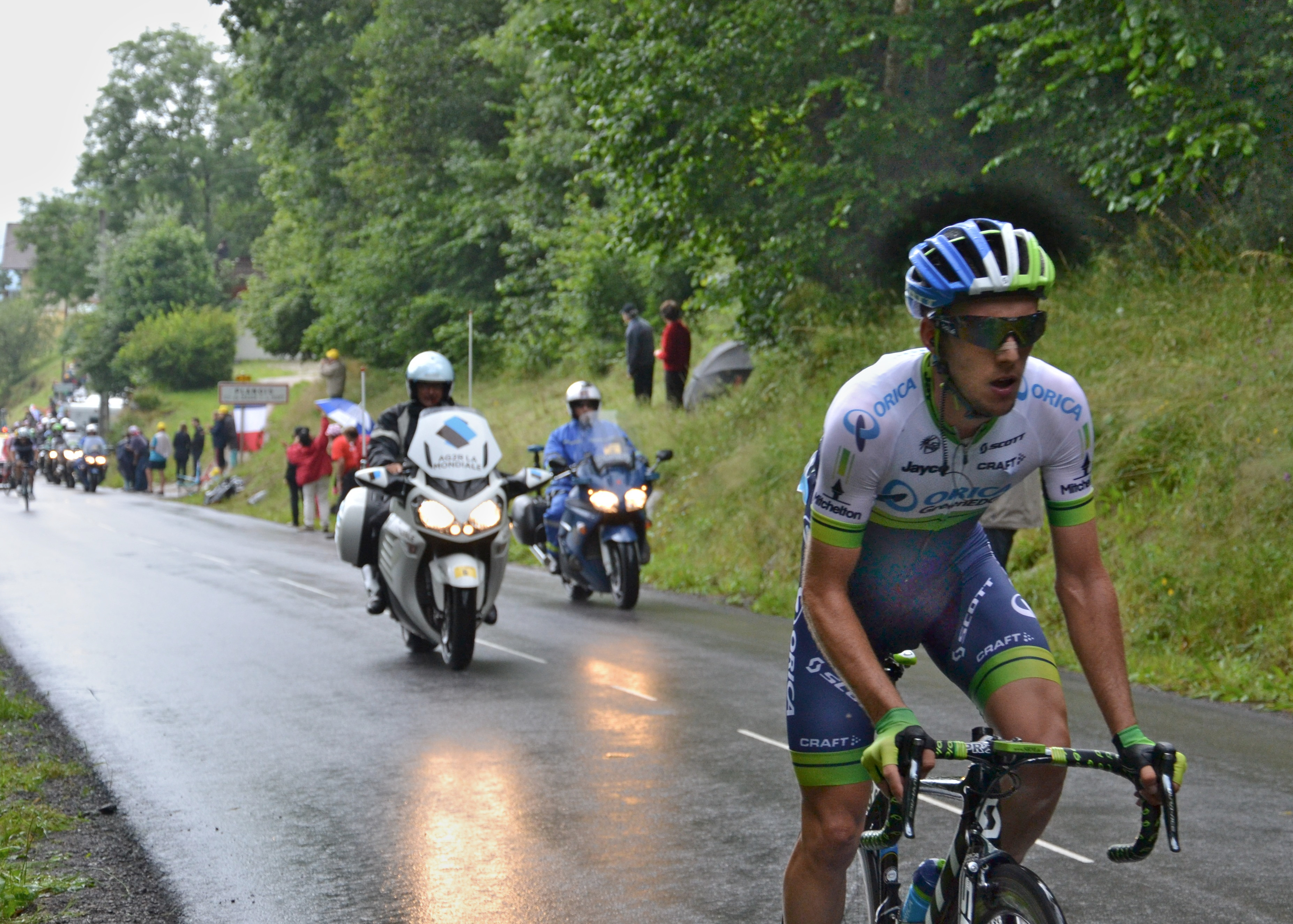
- Simon Yates on Stage 8 2014 Tour de France
- Manager: Shayne Bannan

Season victories
- One-day races: 7
- Stage race overall: 4
- Stage race stages: 18

The 2014 season for the Orica–GreenEDGE cycling team began in January at the Tour de San Luis. As a UCI ProTeam, they were automatically invited and obligated to send a squad to every event in the UCI World Tour.

== 2014 roster ==
As of 1 January 2014.

Rider	Date of birth
Michael Albasini (SUI)	20 December 1980 (aged 33)
Sam Bewley (NZL)	22 July 1987 (aged 26)
Esteban Chaves (COL)	17 January 1990 (aged 23)
Simon Clarke (AUS)	18 July 1986 (aged 27)
Mitchell Docker (AUS)	2 October 1986 (aged 27)
Luke Durbridge (AUS)	9 April 1991 (aged 22)
Simon Gerrans (AUS)	16 May 1980 (aged 33)
Matthew Goss (AUS)	5 November 1986 (aged 27)
Mathew Hayman (AUS)	20 April 1978 (aged 35)
Michael Hepburn (AUS)	17 August 1991 (aged 22)
Leigh Howard (AUS)	18 October 1989 (aged 24)
Damien Howson (AUS)	13 August 1992 (aged 21)
Daryl Impey (RSA)	6 December 1984 (aged 29)

Rider	Date of birth
Jens Keukeleire (BEL)	23 November 1988 (aged 25)
Aidis Kruopis (LIT)	26 October 1986 (aged 27)
Brett Lancaster (AUS)	15 November 1979 (aged 34)
Michael Matthews (AUS)	26 September 1990 (aged 23)
Christian Meier (CAN)	2 September 1985 (aged 28)
Cameron Meyer (AUS)	11 January 1988 (aged 25)
Jens Mouris (NED)	12 March 1980 (aged 33)
Ivan Santaromita (ITA)	30 April 1984 (aged 28)
Svein Tuft (CAN)	19 May 1977 (aged 36)
Pieter Weening (NED)	5 April 1981 (aged 32)
Adam Yates (GBR)	7 August 1992 (aged 21)
Simon Yates (GBR)	7 August 1992 (aged 21)

Riders who joined the team for the 2014 season

Rider	2013 team
Esteban Chaves	Colombia
Mathew Hayman	Team Sky
Damien Howson	neo-pro (stagiaire, Orica–GreenEDGE)
Ivan Santaromita	BMC Racing Team
Adam Yates	neo-pro (CC Etupes-Le Doubs)
Simon Yates	neo-pro

Riders who left the team during or after the 2013 season

Rider	2014 team
Fumiyuki Beppu	Trek Factory Racing
Baden Cooke	Retired
Allan Davis	Retired
Julian Dean	Retired
Sebastian Langeveld	Garmin–Sharp
Travis Meyer	Drapac Professional Cycling
Stuart O'Grady	Retired
Wesley Sulzberger	Drapac Professional Cycling
Daniel Teklehaymanot	MTN–Qhubeka
Tomas Vaitkus	Retired

== Season victories ==
Date	Race	Competition	Rider	Country	Location
21 January	Tour Down Under, Stage 1	UCI World Tour	Simon Gerrans (AUS)	Australia	Angaston
26 January	Tour Down Under, Overall	UCI World Tour	Simon Gerrans (AUS)	Australia	
26 January	Tour Down Under, Sprints classification	UCI World Tour	Simon Gerrans (AUS)	Australia	
26 January	Tour Down Under, Teams classification	UCI World Tour	(Note: The riders on the squad were Simon Gerrans, Simon Clarke, Matthew Goss, Mathew Hayman, Daryl Impey, Michael Matthews and Luke Durbridge)	Australia	
26 January	Tour de San Luis, Young rider classification	UCI America Tour	Adam Yates (GBR)	Argentina	
7 February	Herald Sun Tour, Stage 2	UCI Oceania Tour	Simon Clarke (AUS)	Australia	Bendigo
9 February	Herald Sun Tour, Overall	UCI Oceania Tour	Simon Clarke (AUS)	Australia	
9 February	Herald Sun Tour, Teams classification	UCI Oceania Tour	(Note: The riders on the squad were Simon Gerrans, Simon Clarke, Mitchell Docker, Matthew Goss, Damien Howson and Cameron Meyer)	Australia	
11 February	Tour of Qatar, Stage 3	UCI Asia Tour	Michael Hepburn (AUS)	Qatar	Losail Circuit
8 March	Tour de Langkawi, Sprints classification	UCI Asia Tour	Aidis Kruopis (LTU)	Malaysia	
6 April	Vuelta a La Rioja	UCI Europe Tour	Michael Matthews (AUS)	Spain	Logroño
9 April	Tour of the Basque Country, Stage 3	UCI World Tour	Michael Matthews (AUS)	Spain	Vitoria-Gasteiz
27 April	Liège–Bastogne–Liège	UCI World Tour	Simon Gerrans (AUS)	Belgium	Ans
30 April	Tour de Romandie, Stage 1	UCI World Tour	Michael Albasini (SUI)	Switzerland	Sion
1 May	Tour de Romandie, Stage 2	UCI World Tour	Michael Albasini (SUI)	Switzerland	Montreux
2 May	Tour of Turkey, Stage 6	UCI Europe Tour	Adam Yates (GBR)	Turkey	Selçuk
3 May	Tour de Romandie, Stage 4	UCI World Tour	Michael Albasini (SUI)	Switzerland	Fribourg
4 May	Tour of Turkey, Overall	UCI Europe Tour	Adam Yates (GBR)	Turkey	
9 May	Giro d'Italia, Stage 1	UCI World Tour	Team time trial (Note: The riders on the squad were Ivan Santaromita, Luke Durbridge, Michael Hepburn, Brett Lancaster, Michael Matthews, Cameron Meyer, Mitchell Docker, Svein Tuft and Pieter Weening)	United Kingdom	Belfast
15 May	Giro d'Italia, Stage 6	UCI World Tour	Michael Matthews (AUS)	Italy	Montecassino
16 May	Tour of California, Stage 6	UCI America Tour	Esteban Chaves (COL)	United States	Mountain High
18 May	Giro d'Italia, Stage 9	UCI World Tour	Pieter Weening (NED)	Italy	Sestola
30 May	Bayern Rundfahrt, Stage 3	UCI Europe Tour	Daryl Impey (RSA)	Germany	Neusäß
1 June	Bayern Rundfahrt, Mountains classification	UCI Europe Tour	Christian Meier (CAN)	Germany	
15 June	Tour de Suisse, Stage 2	UCI World Tour	Cameron Meyer (AUS)	Switzerland	Sarnen
19 June	Tour of Slovenia, Stage 1	UCI Europe Tour	Michael Matthews (AUS)	Slovenia	Ljubljana
21 June	Tour de Suisse, Stage 8	UCI World Tour	Esteban Chaves (COL)	Switzerland	Verbier
22 June	Tour of Slovenia, Points classification	UCI Europe Tour	Michael Matthews (AUS)	Slovenia	
22 June	Tour of Slovenia, Young rider classification	UCI Europe Tour	Simon Yates (GBR)	Slovenia	
26 July	GP Industria & Artigianato di Larciano	UCI Europe Tour	Adam Yates (GBR)	Italy	Larciano
27 July	Giro di Toscana	UCI Europe Tour	Pieter Weening (NED)	Italy	Arezzo
25 August	Vuelta a España, Stage 3	UCI World Tour	Michael Matthews (AUS)	Spain	Arcos de la Frontera
7 September	Tour of Alberta, Stage 5	UCI America Tour	Daryl Impey (RSA)	Canada	Edmonton
7 September	Tour of Alberta, Overall	UCI America Tour	Daryl Impey (RSA)	Canada	
7 September	Tour of Alberta, Mountains classification	UCI America Tour	Simon Yates (GBR)	Canada	
12 September	Grand Prix Cycliste de Québec	UCI World Tour	Simon Gerrans (AUS)	Canada	Quebec City
14 September	Grand Prix Cycliste de Montréal	UCI World Tour	Simon Gerrans (AUS)	Canada	Montreal
18 September	Tre Valli Varesine	UCI Europe Tour	Michael Albasini (SUI)	Italy	Varese
14 October	Tour of Beijing, Young rider classification	UCI World Tour	Esteban Chaves (COL)	China	
14 October	Tour of Beijing, Teams classification	UCI World Tour	(Note: The riders on the squad were Esteban Chaves, Sam Bewley, Caleb Ewan, Mathew Hayman, Daryl Impey, Jens Mouris, Pieter Weening and Simon Yates)	China	
