= 2014 UCI World Tour =

Road cycling competitions

- Fourth edition of the UCI World Tour

Details
- Dates: 21 January – 14 October
- Location: Europe, Canada, Australia and China
- Races: 29

Champions
- Individual champion: Alejandro Valverde (Spain) (Movistar Team)
- Teams' champion: Movistar Team
- Nations' champion: Spain

The 2014 UCI World Tour was the sixth edition of the ranking system launched by the Union Cycliste Internationale (UCI) in 2009. The series started with the opening stage of the Tour Down Under on 21 January, and concluded with the final stage of the Tour of Beijing on 14 October.

After winning the 2008 UCI ProTour, Spain's Alejandro Valverde won his first World Tour individual points title, amassing 686 points over the course of the season. The Movistar Team rider finished 66 points clear of his closest rival and compatriot Alberto Contador of Tinkoff–Saxo, while Australian rider Simon Gerrans was third for the Orica–GreenEDGE team, but was over 200 points in arrears of Valverde. In the teams' rankings, Movistar Team finished top for the second year running, with a total of 1440 points. Second place went to the BMC Racing Team after taking overall victories in two of the season's last three races, while Tinkoff–Saxo finished in third position. The nations' rankings was comfortably headed by Spain, with a points advantage of 764 over Italy.

== Teams ==
The UCI ProTeams competed in the World Tour, with UCI Professional Continental teams, or national squads, able to enter at the discretion of the organisers of each event.

2014 UCI Pro Teams and equipment
Code	Official team name	Licence holder	Country	Groupset	Bicycles
ALM	Ag2r–La Mondiale (2014 season)	EUSRL France Cyclisme	France	Campagnolo	Focus
AST	Astana (2014 season)	Abacanto SA	Kazakhstan	Campagnolo	Specialized
BEL	Belkin Pro Cycling (2014 season)	Rabo Wielerploegen	Netherlands	Shimano	Bianchi
BMC	BMC Racing Team (2014 season)	Continuum Sports LLC	United States	Shimano	BMC
CAN	Cannondale (2014 season)	Brixia Sports	Italy	SRAM	Cannondale
EUC	Team Europcar (2014 season)	SA Vendée Cyclisme	France	Campagnolo	Colnago
FDJ	FDJ.fr (2014 season)	Société de Gestion de L'Echappée	France	Shimano	Lapierre
GIA	Giant–Shimano (2014 season)	SMS Cycling B.V.	Netherlands	Shimano	Giant
GRS	Garmin–Sharp (2014 season)	Slipstream Sports, LLC	United States	Shimano	Cervélo
KAT	Team Katusha (2014 season)	Katusha Management SA	Russia	Shimano	Canyon
LAM	Lampre–Merida (2014 season)	CGS Cycling Team AG	Italy	Shimano	Merida
LTB	Lotto–Belisol (2014 season)	Belgian Cycling Company sa	Belgium	Campagnolo	Ridley
MOV	Movistar Team (2014 season)	Abarca Sports S.L.	Spain	Campagnolo	Canyon
OGE	Orica–GreenEDGE (2014 season)	GreenEdge Cycling	Australia	Shimano	Scott
OPQ	Omega Pharma–Quick-Step (2014 season)	Esperanza bvba	Belgium	SRAM	Specialized
SKY	Team Sky (2014 season)	Tour Racing Limited	Great Britain	Shimano	Pinarello
TCS	Tinkoff–Saxo (2014 season)	Tinkoff Sport	Russia	SRAM	Specialized
TFR	Trek Factory Racing (2014 season)	Trek Bicycle Corporation	United States	Shimano	Trek

== Events ==
All events from the 2013 UCI World Tour were included.

Race	Date	Winner		Second		Third		Other points (4th place onwards)	Stage points
(Australia) Tour Down Under	January 21 – 26	Simon Gerrans (AUS)	100 pts	Cadel Evans (AUS)	80 pts	Diego Ulissi (ITA)	70 pts	60, 50, 40, 30, 20, 10, 4	6, 4, 2, 1, 1
(France) Paris–Nice	March 9 – 16	Carlos Betancur (COL)	100 pts	Rui Costa (POR)	80 pts	Arthur Vichot (FRA)	70 pts	60, 50, 40, 30, 20, 10, 4	6, 4, 2, 1, 1
(Italy) Tirreno–Adriatico	March 12 – 18	Alberto Contador (ESP)	100 pts	Nairo Quintana (COL)	80 pts	Roman Kreuziger (CZE)	70 pts	60, 50, 40, 30, 20, 10, 4	6, 4, 2, 1, 1
(Italy) Milan–San Remo	March 23	Alexander Kristoff (NOR)	100 pts	Fabian Cancellara (SUI)	80 pts	Ben Swift (GBR)	70 pts	60, 50, 40, 30, 20, 10, 4	N/A
(Spain) Volta a Catalunya	March 24 – 30	Joaquim Rodríguez (ESP)	100 pts	Alberto Contador (ESP)	80 pts	Tejay van Garderen (USA)	70 pts	60, 50, 40, 30, 20, 10, 4	6, 4, 2, 1, 1
(Belgium) E3 Harelbeke	March 28	Peter Sagan (SVK)	80 pts	Niki Terpstra (NED)	60 pts	Geraint Thomas (GBR)	50 pts	40, 30, 22, 14, 10, 6, 2	N/A
(Belgium) Gent–Wevelgem	March 30	John Degenkolb (GER)	80 pts	Arnaud Démare (FRA)	60 pts	Peter Sagan (SVK)	50 pts	40, 30, 22, 14, 10, 6, 2	N/A
(Belgium) Tour of Flanders	April 6	Fabian Cancellara (SUI)	100 pts	Greg Van Avermaet (BEL)	80 pts	Sep Vanmarcke (BEL)	70 pts	60, 50, 40, 30, 20, 10, 4	N/A
(Spain) Tour of the Basque Country	April 7 – 12	Alberto Contador (ESP)	100 pts	Michał Kwiatkowski (POL)	80 pts	Jean-Christophe Péraud (FRA)	70 pts	60, 50, 40, 30, 20, 10, 4	6, 4, 2, 1, 1
(France) Paris–Roubaix	April 13	Niki Terpstra (NED)	100 pts	John Degenkolb (GER)	80 pts	Fabian Cancellara (SUI)	70 pts	60, 50, 40, 30, 20, 10, 4	N/A
(Netherlands) Amstel Gold Race	April 20	Philippe Gilbert (BEL)	80 pts	Jelle Vanendert (BEL)	60 pts	Simon Gerrans (AUS)	50 pts	40, 30, 22, 14, 10, 6, 2	N/A
(Belgium) La Flèche Wallonne	April 23	Alejandro Valverde (ESP)	80 pts	Dan Martin (IRL)	60 pts	Michał Kwiatkowski (POL)	50 pts	40, 30, 22, 14, 10, 6, 2	N/A
(Belgium) Liège–Bastogne–Liège	April 27	Simon Gerrans (AUS)	100 pts	Alejandro Valverde (ESP)	80 pts	Michał Kwiatkowski (POL)	70 pts	60, 50, 40, 30, 20, 10, 4	N/A
(Switzerland) Tour de Romandie	April 29 – May 4	Chris Froome (GBR)	100 pts	Simon Špilak (SLO)	80 pts	Rui Costa (POR)	70 pts	60, 50, 40, 30, 20, 10, 4	6, 4, 2, 1, 1
(Italy) Giro d'Italia	May 9 – June 1	Nairo Quintana (COL)	170 pts	Rigoberto Urán (COL)	130 pts	Fabio Aru (ITA)	100 pts	90, 80, 70, 60, 52, 44, 38, 32, 26, 22, 18, 14, 10, 8, 6, 4, 2	16, 8, 4, 2, 1
(France) Critérium du Dauphiné	June 8 – 15	Andrew Talansky (USA)	100 pts	Alberto Contador (ESP)	80 pts	Jurgen Van den Broeck (BEL)	70 pts	60, 50, 40, 30, 20, 10, 4	6, 4, 2, 1, 1
(Switzerland) Tour de Suisse	June 14 – 22	Rui Costa (POR)	100 pts	Mathias Frank (SUI)	0 pts (Note: As Frank rode for IAM Cycling, which is not a World Tour team, he was ineligible to score points towards the UCI World Tour standings.)	Bauke Mollema (NED)	70 pts	60, 50, 40, 30, 20, 10, 4	6, 4, 2, 1, 1
Tour de France	July 5 – 27	Vincenzo Nibali (ITA)	200 pts	Jean-Christophe Péraud (FRA)	150 pts	Thibaut Pinot (FRA)	120 pts	110, 100, 90, 80, 70, 60, 50, 40, 30, 24, 20, 16, 12, 10, 8, 6, 4	20, 10, 6, 4, 2
(Spain) Clásica de San Sebastián	August 2	Alejandro Valverde (ESP)	80 pts	Bauke Mollema (NED)	60 pts	Joaquim Rodríguez (ESP)	50 pts	40, 30, 22, 14, 10, 6, 2	N/A
(Poland) Tour de Pologne	August 3 – 9	Rafał Majka (POL)	100 pts	Jon Izagirre (ESP)	80 pts	Beñat Intxausti (ESP)	70 pts	60, 50, 40, 30, 20, 10, 4	6, 4, 2, 1, 1
(Belgium) (Netherlands) Eneco Tour	August 11 – 17	Tim Wellens (BEL)	100 pts	Lars Boom (NED)	80 pts	Tom Dumoulin (NED)	70 pts	60, 50, 40, 30, 20, 10, 4	6, 4, 2, 1, 1
(Spain) Vuelta a España	August 23 – September 14	Alberto Contador (ESP)	170 pts	Chris Froome (GBR)	130 pts	Alejandro Valverde (ESP)	100 pts	90, 80, 70, 60, 52, 44, 38, 32, 26, 22, 18, 14, 10, 8, 6, 4, 2	16, 8, 4, 2, 1
(Germany) Vattenfall Cyclassics	August 24	Alexander Kristoff (NOR)	80 pts	Giacomo Nizzolo (ITA)	60 pts	Simon Gerrans (AUS)	50 pts	40, 30, 22, 14, 10, 6, 2	N/A
GP Ouest-France	August 31	Sylvain Chavanel (FRA)	0 pts (Note: As Chavanel rode for IAM Cycling, which is not a World Tour team, he was ineligible to score points towards the UCI World Tour standings.)	Andrea Fedi (ITA)	0 pts (Note: As Fedi rode for Neri Sottoli, which is not a World Tour team, he was ineligible to score points towards the UCI World Tour standings.)	Arthur Vichot (FRA)	50 pts	40, 30, 22, 14, 10, 6, 2	N/A
(Canada) GP de Québec	September 12	Simon Gerrans (AUS)	80 pts	Tom Dumoulin (NED)	60 pts	Ramūnas Navardauskas (LTU)	50 pts	40, 30, 22, 14, 10, 6, 2	N/A
(Canada) GP de Montréal	September 14	Simon Gerrans (AUS)	80 pts	Rui Costa (POR)	60 pts	Tony Gallopin (FRA)	50 pts	40, 30, 22, 14, 10, 6, 2	N/A
(Spain) Team time trial at the World Championships (Note: The World Team Time Trial Championship awarded points only in the team rankings, not in the individual or national standings.)	September 21	BMC Racing Team	200 pts	Orica–GreenEDGE	170 pts	Omega Pharma–Quick-Step	140 pts	130, 120, 110, 100, 90, 80, 70	N/A
(Italy) Giro di Lombardia	October 5	Dan Martin (IRL)	100 pts	Alejandro Valverde (ESP)	80 pts	Rui Costa (POR)	70 pts	60, 50, 40, 30, 20, 10, 4	N/A
(China) Tour of Beijing	October 10 – 14	Philippe Gilbert (BEL)	100 pts	Dan Martin (IRL)	80 pts	Esteban Chaves (COL)	70 pts	60, 50, 40, 30, 20, 10, 4	6, 4, 2, 1, 1

== Final standings ==
=== Individual ===
Riders tied with the same number of points were classified by number of victories, then number of second places, third places, and so on, in World Tour events and stages.

Rank	Name	Team	Points
1	Alejandro Valverde (ESP)	Movistar Team	686
2	Alberto Contador (ESP)	Tinkoff–Saxo	620
3	Simon Gerrans (AUS)	Orica–GreenEDGE	478
4	Rui Costa (POR)	Lampre–Merida	461
5	Vincenzo Nibali (ITA)	Astana	392
6	Nairo Quintana (COL)	Movistar Team	346
7	Chris Froome (GBR)	Team Sky	326
8	Alexander Kristoff (NOR)	Team Katusha	321
9	Dan Martin (IRL)	Garmin–Sharp	316
10	Jean-Christophe Péraud (FRA)	Ag2r–La Mondiale	300
11	Fabian Cancellara (SUI)	Trek Factory Racing	286
12	Joaquim Rodríguez (ESP)	Team Katusha	286
13	John Degenkolb (GER)	Giant–Shimano	278
14	Philippe Gilbert (BEL)	BMC Racing Team	272
15	Peter Sagan (SVK)	Cannondale	263
16	Michał Kwiatkowski (POL)	Omega Pharma–Quick-Step	257
17	Fabio Aru (ITA)	Astana	248
18	Romain Bardet (FRA)	Ag2r–La Mondiale	247
19	Bauke Mollema (NED)	Belkin Pro Cycling	246
20	Rafał Majka (POL)	Tinkoff–Saxo	241
21	Tom Dumoulin (NED)	Giant–Shimano	240
22	Tejay van Garderen (USA)	BMC Racing Team	219
23	Sep Vanmarcke (BEL)	Belkin Pro Cycling	216
24	Greg Van Avermaet (BEL)	BMC Racing Team	210
25	Tim Wellens (BEL)	Lotto–Belisol	204

- 236 riders scored points. 43 other riders finished in positions that would have earned them points, but they were ineligible as members of non-ProTour teams.

=== Team ===
Team rankings were calculated by adding the ranking points of the top five riders of a team in the table, plus points gained in the World Team Time Trial Championship (WTTT).

Rank	Team	Points	Top 5 riders	WTTT
1	Movistar Team	1440	Valverde (686), N. Quintana (346), Intxausti (119), J. Izagirre (105), Lobato (74)	110
2	BMC Racing Team	1212	Gilbert (272), van Garderen (219), Van Avermaet (210), Evans (188), Sánchez (123)	200
3	Tinkoff–Saxo	1186	Contador (620), Majka (241), Kreuziger (135), Rogers (60), Bennati (10)	120
4	Omega Pharma–Quick-Step	1016	Kwiatkowski (257), Terpstra (200), Urán (173), T. Martin (146), Vandenbergh (100)	140
5	Orica–GreenEDGE	953	Gerrans (478), Chaves (80), Albasini (80), Impey (73), Matthews (72)	170
6	Team Katusha	938	Kristoff (321), Rodríguez (286), Špilak (173), D. Moreno (84), G. Caruso (74)	0
7	Ag2r–La Mondiale	919	Péraud (300), Bardet (247), Pozzovivo (197), Betancur (114), Riblon (61)	0
8	Giant–Shimano	905	Degenkolb (278), T. Dumoulin (240), Kittel (136), Barguil (103), Mezgec (58)	90
9	Team Sky	890	Froome (326), Thomas (168), Nieve (104), Swift (91), Porte (71)	130
10	Astana	823	Nibali (392), Aru (248), Fuglsang (97), Hryvko (60), Gasparotto (26)	0
11	Garmin–Sharp	807	D. Martin (316), Talansky (135), Navardauskas (126), Slagter (84), Hesjedal (76)	70
12	Belkin Pro Cycling	795	Mollema (246), Vanmarcke (216), Kelderman (162), Boom (109), Gesink (62)	0
13	Trek Factory Racing	759	Cancellara (286), Nizzolo (108), Arredondo (101), Zubeldia (84), Kišerlovski (80)	100
14	Lampre–Merida	706	Costa (461), Ulissi (125), Niemiec (67), Modolo (36), Cimolai (17)	0
15	Lotto–Belisol	590	Wellens (204), Gallopin (140), J. Vanendert (104), Van den Broeck (96), Greipel (46)	0
16	FDJ.fr	505	Pinot (162), Vichot (128), Bouhanni (116), Démare (77), Geniez (22)	0
17	Cannondale	456	P. Sagan (263), D. Caruso (47), Formolo (30), De Marchi (22), Basso (14)	80
18	Team Europcar	271	Rolland (138), Gautier (84), Sicard (22), Voeckler (16), Coquard (11)	0

=== Nation ===
National rankings were calculated by adding the ranking points of the top five riders registered in a nation in the table. The national rankings were also used to determine how many riders a country could have in the World Championships.

Rank	Nation	Points	Top five riders
1	Spain	1834	Valverde (686), Contador (620), Rodríguez (286), Sánchez (123), Intxausti (119)
2	Italy	1070	Nibali (392), Aru (248), Pozzovivo (197), Ulissi (125), Nizzolo (108)
3	Belgium	1006	Gilbert (272), Vanmarcke (216), Van Avermaet (210), Wellens (204), J. Vanendert (104)
4	France	987	Péraud (300), Bardet (247), Pinot (162), Gallopin (140), Rolland (138)
5	Netherlands	957	Mollema (246), T. Dumoulin (240), Terpstra (200), Kelderman (162), Boom (109)
6	Australia	869	Gerrans (478), Evans (188), Matthews (72), Porte (71), Rogers (60)
7	Colombia	814	N. Quintana (346), Urán (173), Betancur (114), Arredondo (101), Chaves (80)
8	Great Britain	721	Froome (326), Thomas (168), Cavendish (92), Swift (91), A. Yates (44)
9	Germany	640	Degenkolb (278), T. Martin (146), Kittel (136), Greipel (46), Geschke (34)
10	Poland	565	Kwiatkowski (257), Majka (241), Niemiec (67)
11	Portugal	463	Costa (461), Cardoso (2)
12	United States	430	van Garderen (219), Talansky (135), Farrar (64), Horner (10), B. King (2)
13	Switzerland	423	Cancellara (286), Albasini (80), Morabito (42), Zaugg (9), Dillier (6)
14	Ireland	357	D. Martin (316), Deignan (38), Roche (3)
15	Norway	332	Kristoff (321), Hushovd (8), Boasson Hagen (2), Nordhaug (1)

- Riders from 34 countries scored points.

== Leader progress ==
Event (Winner)	Individual	Team	Nation
Tour Down Under (Simon Gerrans)	Simon Gerrans	Orica–GreenEDGE	Australia
Paris–Nice (Carlos Betancur)	Carlos Betancur	Lampre–Merida	Australia
Tirreno–Adriatico (Alberto Contador)	Carlos Betancur	Ag2r–La Mondiale	Australia
Milan–San Remo (Alexander Kristoff)	Carlos Betancur	Movistar Team	Australia
E3 Harelbeke (Peter Sagan)	Carlos Betancur	Movistar Team	Australia
Volta a Catalunya (Joaquim Rodríguez)	Alberto Contador	Ag2r–La Mondiale	Spain
Gent–Wevelgem (John Degenkolb)	Alberto Contador	Ag2r–La Mondiale	Spain
Tour of Flanders (Fabian Cancellara)	Alberto Contador	Omega Pharma–Quick-Step	Spain
Tour of the Basque Country (Alberto Contador)	Alberto Contador	Omega Pharma–Quick-Step	Spain
Paris–Roubaix (Niki Terpstra)	Alberto Contador	Omega Pharma–Quick-Step	Spain
Amstel Gold Race (Philippe Gilbert)	Alberto Contador	Omega Pharma–Quick-Step	Spain
La Flèche Wallonne (Alejandro Valverde)	Alberto Contador	Omega Pharma–Quick-Step	Spain
Liège–Bastogne–Liège (Simon Gerrans)	Alberto Contador	Omega Pharma–Quick-Step	Spain
Tour de Romandie (Chris Froome)	Alberto Contador	Omega Pharma–Quick-Step	Spain
Giro d'Italia (Nairo Quintana)	Nairo Quintana	Omega Pharma–Quick-Step	Spain
Critérium du Dauphiné (Andrew Talansky)	Alberto Contador	Omega Pharma–Quick-Step	Spain
Tour de Suisse (Rui Costa)	Alberto Contador	Omega Pharma–Quick-Step	Spain
Tour de France (Vincenzo Nibali)	Alberto Contador	Movistar Team	Spain
Clásica de San Sebastián (Alejandro Valverde)	Alejandro Valverde	Movistar Team	Spain
Tour de Pologne (Rafał Majka)	Alejandro Valverde	Movistar Team	Spain
Eneco Tour (Tim Wellens)	Alejandro Valverde	Movistar Team	Spain
Vattenfall Cyclassics (Alexander Kristoff)	Alejandro Valverde	Movistar Team	Spain
GP Ouest-France (Sylvain Chavanel)	Alejandro Valverde	Movistar Team	Spain
GP de Québec (Simon Gerrans)	Alejandro Valverde	Movistar Team	Spain
Vuelta a España (Alberto Contador)	Alberto Contador	Movistar Team	Spain
GP de Montréal (Simon Gerrans)	Alberto Contador	Movistar Team	Spain
World TTT Championships (BMC Racing Team)	Alberto Contador	Movistar Team	Spain
Giro di Lombardia (Dan Martin)	Alejandro Valverde	Movistar Team	Spain
Tour of Beijing (Philippe Gilbert)	Alejandro Valverde	Movistar Team	Spain
