= 2014 Astana season =

Astana
- 2014 season
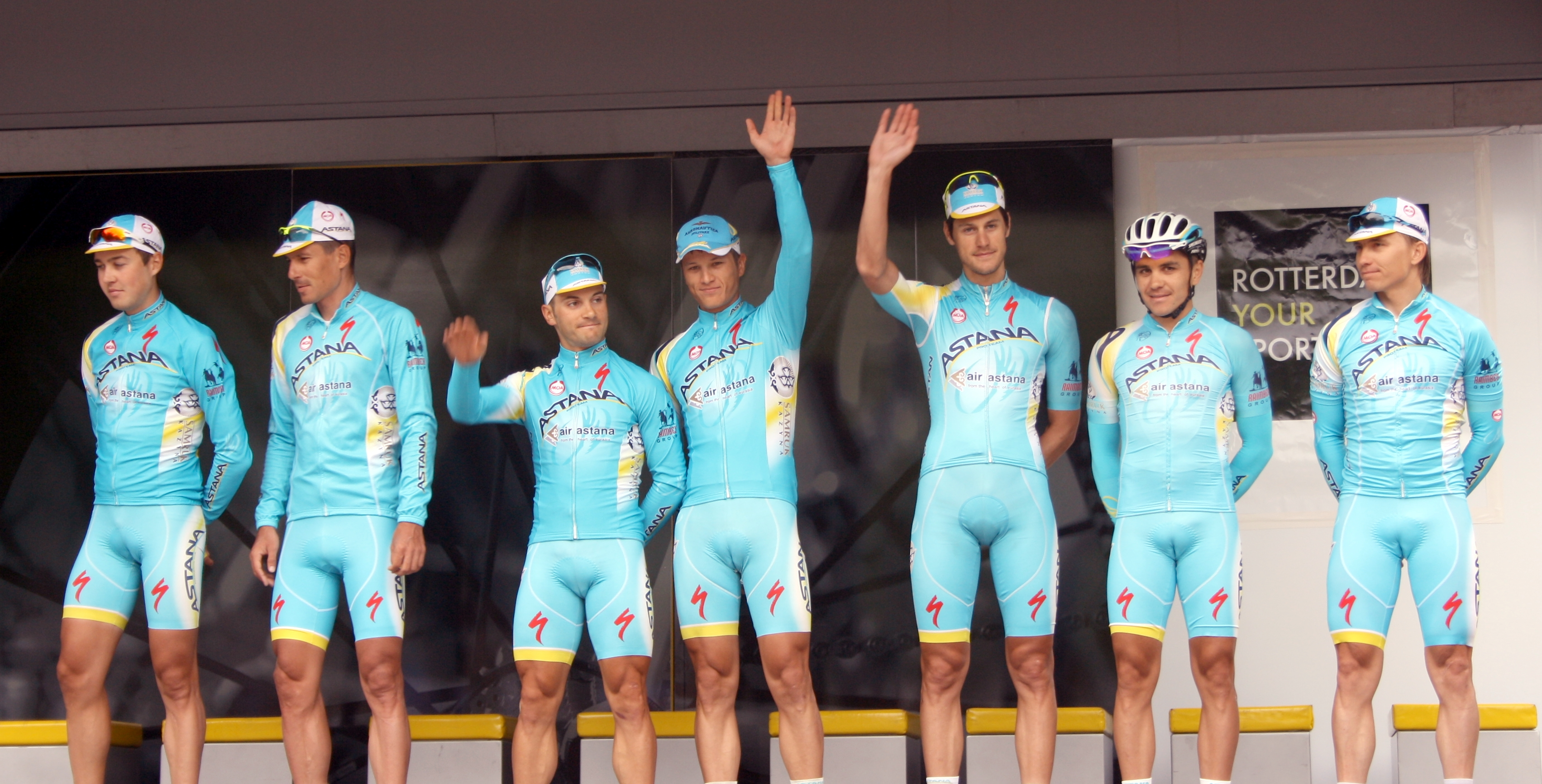
- The team at the 2014 World Ports Classic
- UCI code: AST
- Status: UCI ProTeam
- World Tour Rank: 10th (823 points)
- Manager: Alexander Vinokourov
- Main sponsor(s): Samruk-Kazyna
- Based: Kazakhstan
- Bicycles: Specialized
- Groupset: Campagnolo

Season victories
- One-day races: 1
- Stage race overall: 1
- Stage race stages: 17
- Grand Tours: 1
- National Championships: 2
- Most wins: Andrea Guardini (5 wins)
- Best ranked rider: Vincenzo Nibali (5th)

The 2014 season for the Astana cycling team began in January with the Tour Down Under. As a UCI ProTeam, they were automatically invited and obligated to send a squad to every event in the UCI World Tour.
This season was sponsored by the Samruk-Kazyna group as well as Air Astana, Astana Motors and Expo 2017.

== Team roster ==
As of 1 January 2014.

Rider	Date of birth
Valerio Agnoli (ITA)	6 January 1985 (aged 28)
Fabio Aru (ITA)	3 July 1990 (aged 23)
Borut Božič (SLO)	8 August 1980 (aged 33)
Janez Brajkovič (SLO)	18 December 1983 (aged 30)
Alexsandr Dyachenko (KAZ)	17 October 1983 (aged 30)
Daniil Fominykh (KAZ)	28 August 1991 (aged 22)
Jakob Fuglsang (DEN)	22 March 1985 (aged 28)
Enrico Gasparotto (ITA)	22 March 1982 (aged 31)
Francesco Gavazzi (ITA)	1 August 1984 (aged 29)
Dmitriy Gruzdev (KAZ)	13 March 1986 (aged 27)
Andrea Guardini (ITA)	12 June 1989 (aged 24)
Jacopo Guarnieri (ITA)	14 August 1987 (aged 26)
Andriy Hrivko (UKR)	7 August 1983 (aged 30)
Evan Huffman (USA)	7 January 1990 (aged 23)
Maxim Iglinsky (KAZ)	18 April 1981 (aged 32)

Rider	Date of birth
Valentin Iglinsky (KAZ)	12 May 1984 (aged 29)
Arman Kamyshev (KAZ)	14 March 1991 (aged 22)
Tanel Kangert (EST)	11 March 1987 (aged 26)
Fredrik Kessiakoff (SWE)	17 May 1980 (aged 33)
Mikel Landa (ESP)	13 December 1989 (aged 24)
Alexey Lutsenko (KAZ)	7 September 1992 (aged 21)
Dimitry Muravyev (KAZ)	2 November 1979 (aged 34)
Vincenzo Nibali (ITA)	14 November 1984 (aged 29)
Michele Scarponi (ITA)	25 September 1979 (aged 34)
Paolo Tiralongo (ITA)	8 July 1977 (aged 36)
Ruslan Tleubayev (KAZ)	7 March 1987 (aged 26)
Alessandro Vanotti (ITA)	16 September 1980 (aged 33)
Lieuwe Westra (NED)	11 September 1982 (aged 31)
Andrey Zeits (KAZ)	14 December 1986 (aged 27)

Riders who joined the team for the 2014 season

Rider	2013 team
Daniil Fominykh	Astana continental team
Valentin Iglinskiy	Ag2r–La Mondiale
Mikel Landa	Euskaltel–Euskadi
Michele Scarponi	Lampre–Merida
Lieuwe Westra	Vacansoleil–DCM

Riders who left the team during or after the 2013 season

Rider	2014 team
Assan Bazayev	Retired
Andrey Kashechkin	
Simone Ponzi	Yellow Fluo
Kevin Seeldraeyers	Wanty–Groupe Gobert
Egor Silin	Team Katusha

== Season victories ==
Date	Race	Competition	Rider	Country	Location
23 February	Vuelta a Andalucía, Sprints classification	UCI Europe Tour	Andrey Zeits (KAZ)	Spain	
23 February	Vuelta a Andalucía, Teams classification	UCI Europe Tour	(Note: The riders on the squad were Michele Scarponi, Jakob Fuglsang, Paolo Tiralongo, Tanel Kangert, Alexey Lutsenko, Fredrik Kessiakoff and Andrey Zeits)	Spain	
1 March	Tour de Langkawi, Stage 3	UCI Asia Tour	Andrea Guardini (ITA)	Malaysia	Kuala Lumpur
8 March	Tour de Langkawi, Stage 10	UCI Asia Tour	Andrea Guardini (ITA)	Malaysia	Kuala Terengganu
30 March	Volta a Catalunya, Stage 7	UCI World Tour	Lieuwe Westra (NED)	Spain	Barcelona
25 April	Giro del Trentino, Stage 4	UCI Europe Tour	Mikel Landa (ESP)	Italy	Monte Bondone
25 April	Giro del Trentino, Teams classification	UCI Europe Tour	(Note: The riders on the squad were Michele Scarponi, Fabio Aru, Valerio Agnoli, Fredrik Kessiakoff, Mikel Landa, Andrey Zeits, Paolo Tiralongo and Evan Huffman)	Italy	
25 May	Giro d'Italia, Stage 15	UCI World Tour	Fabio Aru (ITA)	Italy	Plan de Montecampione
14 June	Critérium du Dauphiné, Stage 7	UCI World Tour	Lieuwe Westra (NED)	Switzerland	Finhaut–Émosson
15 June	Critérium du Dauphiné, Teams classification	UCI World Tour	(Note: The riders on the squad were Vincenzo Nibali, Jakob Fuglsang, Andriy Hrivko, Dmitriy Gruzdev, Tanel Kangert, Alessandro Vanotti, Lieuwe Westra and Andrey Zeits)	France	
6 July	Tour de France, Stage 2	UCI World Tour	Vincenzo Nibali (ITA)	United Kingdom	Sheffield
14 July	Tour de France, Stage 10	UCI World Tour	Vincenzo Nibali (ITA)	France	La Planche des Belles Filles
18 July	Tour de France, Stage 13	UCI World Tour	Vincenzo Nibali (ITA)	France	Chamrousse
24 July	Tour de France, Stage 18	UCI World Tour	Vincenzo Nibali (ITA)	France	Hautacam
27 July	Tour de France, Overall	UCI World Tour	Vincenzo Nibali (ITA)	France	
7 August	Danmark Rundt, Stage 2	UCI Europe Tour	Andrea Guardini (ITA)	Denmark	Aarhus
9 August	Danmark Rundt, Stage 4	UCI Europe Tour	Andrea Guardini (ITA)	Denmark	Odense
9 August	Danmark Rundt, Stage 5	UCI Europe Tour	Alexey Lutsenko (KAZ)	Denmark	Middelfart
10 August	Danmark Rundt, Points classification	UCI Europe Tour	Alexey Lutsenko (KAZ)	Denmark	
11 August	Eneco Tour, Stage 1	UCI World Tour	Andrea Guardini (ITA)	Netherlands	Terneuzen
17 August	Vuelta a Burgos, Teams classification	UCI Europe Tour	(Note: The riders on the squad were Mikel Landa, Valerio Agnoli, Janez Brajkovič, Paolo Tiralongo, Fredrik Kessiakoff, Andrey Zeits, Ilya Davidenok and Bakhtiyar Kozhatayev)	Spain	
3 September	Vuelta a España, Stage 11	UCI World Tour	Fabio Aru (ITA)	Spain	Santuario de San Miguel de Aralar
11 September	Vuelta a España, Stage 18	UCI World Tour	Fabio Aru (ITA)	Spain	Mont Castrove, Meis
5 October	Tour of Almaty	UCI Asia Tour	Alexey Lutsenko (KAZ)	Kazakhstan	Almaty
22 October	Tour of Hainan, Stage 3	UCI Asia Tour	Arman Kamyshev (KAZ)	China	Yueliangwan
28 October	Tour of Hainan, Asian rider classification	UCI Asia Tour	Andrey Zeits (KAZ)	China	
