= 2014 Team Katusha season =

Team Katusha
- 2014 season
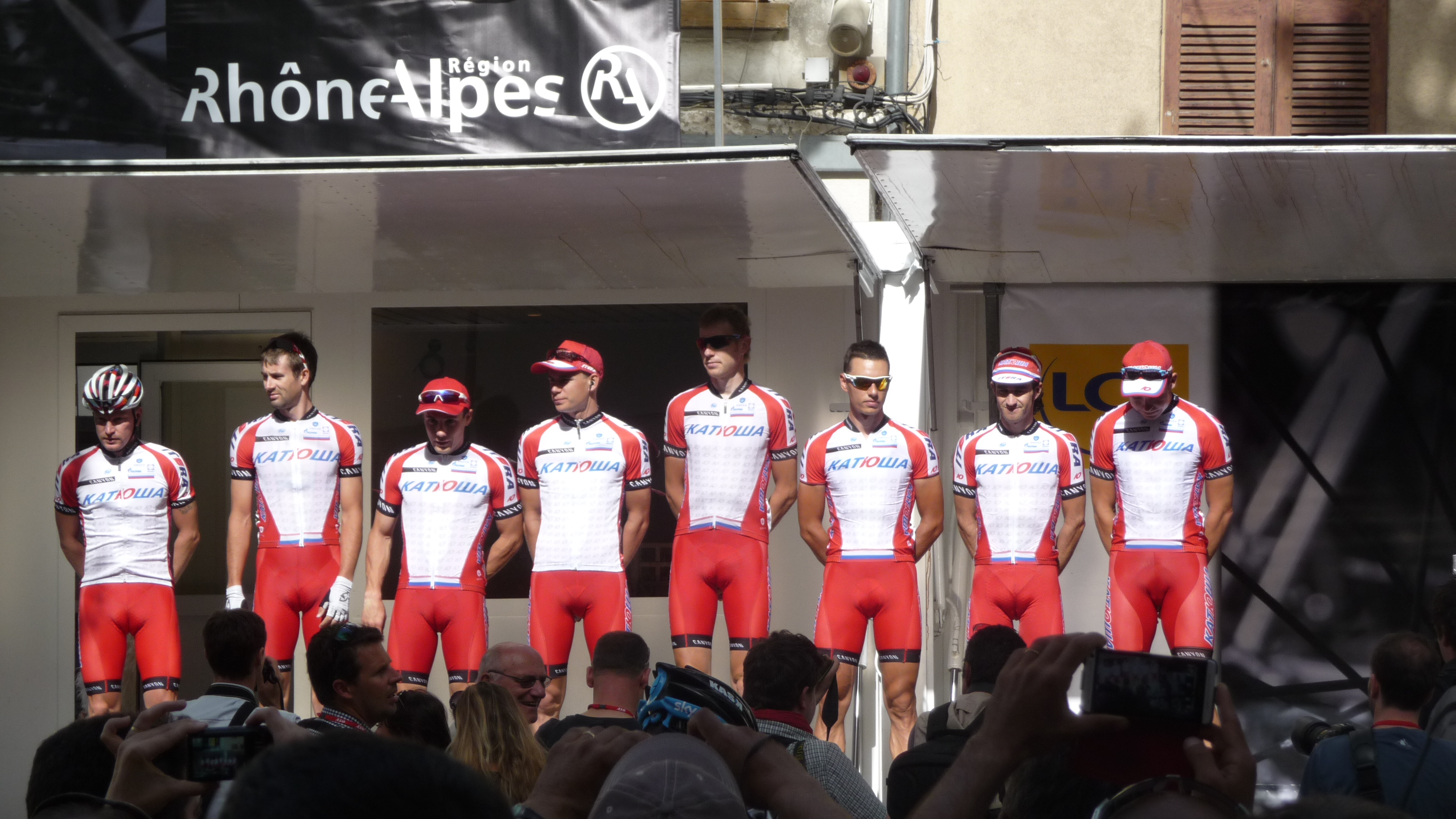
- Départ 2e étape 2014 - Tarare
- Manager: Vyacheslav Ekimov

Season victories
- One-day races: 4
- Stage race overall: 2
- Stage race stages: 16
- Jersey

The 2014 season for Team Katusha began in January at the Tour de San Luis.As a UCI ProTeam, they were automatically invited and obligated to send a squad to every event in the UCI World Tour.

== Team roster ==
As of 1 January 2014.

Rider	Date of birth
Maxim Belkov (RUS)	9 January 1985 (aged 28)
Pavel Brutt (RUS)	29 January 1982 (aged 31)
Giampaolo Caruso (ITA)	15 August 1980 (aged 33)
Sergey Chernetskiy (RUS)	9 April 1990 (aged 23)
Vladimir Gusev (RUS)	4 July 1982 (aged 31)
Marco Haller (AUT)	1 April 1991 (aged 22)
Petr Ignatenko (RUS)	27 September 1987 (aged 26)
Mikhail Ignatiev (RUS)	7 May 1985 (aged 28)
Vladimir Isaichev (RUS)	26 April 1986 (aged 27)
Pavel Kochetkov (RUS)	7 March 1986 (aged 27)
Alexandr Kolobnev (RUS)	4 May 1981 (aged 32)
Dmitry Kozonchuk (RUS)	5 April 1984 (aged 29)
Alexander Kristoff (NOR)	5 July 1987 (aged 26)
Aleksandr Kuschynski (BLR)	27 October 1979 (aged 34)
Vyacheslav Kuznetsov (RUS)	24 June 1989 (aged 24)

Rider	Date of birth
Alberto Losada (ESP)	28 February 1982 (aged 31)
Daniel Moreno (ESP)	5 September 1981 (aged 32)
Luca Paolini (ITA)	17 January 1977 (aged 36)
Alexander Porsev (RUS)	21 February 1986 (aged 27)
Joaquim Rodríguez (ESP)	12 May 1979 (aged 34)
Alexander Rybakov (RUS)	17 May 1988 (aged 25)
Rüdiger Selig (GER)	19 February 1989 (aged 24)
Egor Silin (RUS)	25 June 1988 (aged 25)
Gatis Smukulis (LAT)	15 April 1987 (aged 26)
Simon Špilak (SLO)	23 June 1986 (aged 27)
Yuri Trofimov (RUS)	26 January 1984 (aged 29)
Alexey Tsatevich (RUS)	5 July 1989 (aged 24)
Ángel Vicioso (ESP)	13 April 1977 (aged 36)
Eduard Vorganov (RUS)	1 December 1982 (aged 31)
Anton Vorobyev (RUS)	12 October 1990 (aged 23)

Riders who joined the team for the 2014 season

Rider	2013 team
Pavel Kochetkov	RusVelo
Alexander Rybakov	RusVelo
Egor Silin	Astana

Riders who left the team during or after the 2013 season

Rider	2014 team
Xavier Florencio	Retired
Timofey Kritsky	RusVelo
Denis Menchov	Retired

== Season victories ==
Date	Race	Competition	Rider	Country	Location
19 February	Tour of Oman, Stage 2	UCI Asia Tour	Alexander Kristoff (NOR)	Oman	Quriyat
23 March	Milan–San Remo	UCI World Tour	Alexander Kristoff (NOR)	Italy	Sanremo
26 March	Volta a Catalunya, Stage 3	UCI World Tour	Joaquim Rodríguez (ESP)	Spain	La Molina
30 March	Volta a Catalunya, Overall	UCI World Tour	Joaquim Rodríguez (ESP)	Spain	
1 May	Eschborn–Frankfurt – Rund um den Finanzplatz	UCI Europe Tour	Alexander Kristoff (NOR)	Germany	Frankfurt
2 May	Tour de Romandie, Stage 3	UCI World Tour	Simon Špilak (SLO)	Switzerland	Aigle
21 May	Tour of Norway, Stage 1	UCI Europe Tour	Alexander Kristoff (NOR)	Norway	Larvik
25 May	Tour of Norway, Stage 5	UCI Europe Tour	Alexander Kristoff (NOR)	Norway	Hønefoss
25 May	Tour of Norway, Points classification	UCI Europe Tour	Alexander Kristoff (NOR)	Norway	
29 May	Tour des Fjords, Stage 2	UCI Europe Tour	Alexander Kristoff (NOR)	Norway	Haugesund
31 May	Tour des Fjords, Stage 4	UCI Europe Tour	Alexander Kristoff (NOR)	Norway	Stavanger
1 June	Tour des Fjords, Stage 5	UCI Europe Tour	Alexander Kristoff (NOR)	Norway	Stavanger
1 June	Tour des Fjords, Overall	UCI Europe Tour	Alexander Kristoff (NOR)	Norway	
1 June	Tour des Fjords, Points classification	UCI Europe Tour	Alexander Kristoff (NOR)	Norway	
11 June	Critérium du Dauphiné, Stage 4	UCI World Tour	Yuri Trofimov (RUS)	France	Gap
12 June	Critérium du Dauphiné, Stage 5	UCI World Tour	Simon Špilak (SLO)	France	La Mure
13 July	Tour of Austria, Stage 8	UCI Europe Tour	Marco Haller (AUT)	Austria	Vienna
13 July	Tour of Austria, Mountains classification	UCI Europe Tour	Maxim Belkov (RUS)	Austria	
17 July	Tour de France, Stage 12	UCI World Tour	Alexander Kristoff (NOR)	France	Saint-Étienne
20 July	Tour de France, Stage 15	UCI World Tour	Alexander Kristoff (NOR)	France	Nîmes
15 August	Arctic Race of Norway, Stage 2	UCI Europe Tour	Alexander Kristoff (NOR)	Norway	Alta
16 August	Arctic Race of Norway, Stage 3	UCI Europe Tour	Simon Špilak (SLO)	Norway	Kvænangsfjellet
17 August	Vuelta a Burgos, Points classification	UCI Europe Tour	Daniel Moreno (ESP)	Spain	
17 August	Arctic Race of Norway, Stage 4	UCI Europe Tour	Alexander Kristoff (NOR)	Norway	Tromsø
17 August	Arctic Race of Norway, Points classification	UCI Europe Tour	Alexander Kristoff (NOR)	Norway	
24 August	Vattenfall Cyclassics	UCI World Tour	Alexander Kristoff (NOR)	Germany	Hamburg
14 September	Vuelta a España, Teams classification	UCI World Tour	(Note: The riders on the squad were Joaquim Rodríguez, Giampaolo Caruso, Sergey Chernetskiy, Alexandr Kolobnev, Dmitry Kozonchuk, Alberto Losada, Daniel Moreno, Yuri Trofimov and Eduard Vorganov)	Spain	
1 October	Milano–Torino	UCI Europe Tour	Giampaolo Caruso (ITA)	Italy	Turin
