= 2014 FDJ.fr season =

FDJ.fr
- 2014 season
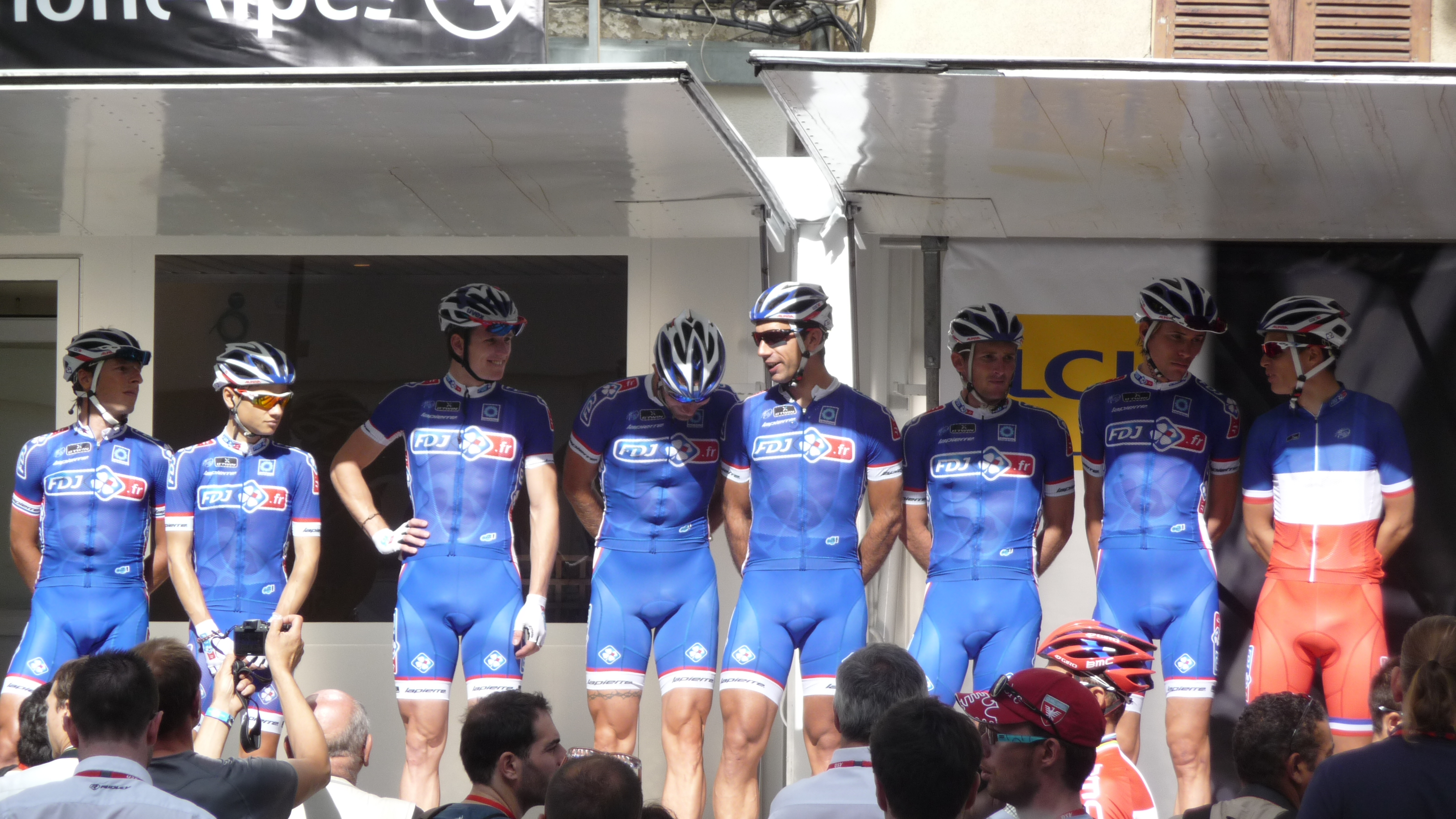
- The team at the 2014 Critérium du Dauphiné
- UCI code: FDJ
- Status: UCI ProTeam
- World Tour Rank: 16th (505 points)
- Manager: Marc Madiot
- Main sponsor(s): Française des Jeux
- Based: France
- Bicycles: Lapierre
- Groupset: Shimano

Season victories
- One-day races: 4
- Stage race overall: 3
- Stage race stages: 19
- National Championships: 3
- Most wins: Nacer Bouhanni (11 wins)
- Best ranked rider: Thibaut Pinot (32nd)

The 2014 season for FDJ.fr began in January at the 2014 Tour Down Under. As a UCI ProTeam, they were automatically invited and obligated to send a squad to every event in the 2014 UCI World Tour.

== Team roster ==
As of 1 January 2014

Rider	Date of birth
William Bonnet (FRA)	25 June 1982 (aged 31)
David Boucher (BEL)	17 March 1980 (aged 33)
Nacer Bouhanni (FRA)	25 July 1990 (aged 23)
Sébastien Chavanel (FRA)	21 March 1983 (aged 30)
Arnaud Courteille (FRA)	13 March 1989 (aged 24)
Mickaël Delage (FRA)	6 August 1985 (aged 28)
Arnaud Démare (FRA)	26 August 1991 (aged 22)
Kenny Elissonde (FRA)	22 July 1991 (aged 22)
Pierrick Fédrigo (FRA)	30 November 1978 (aged 35)
Murilo Fischer (BRA)	16 June 1979 (aged 34)
Alexandre Geniez (FRA)	16 April 1988 (aged 25)
Anthony Geslin (FRA)	9 June 1980 (aged 33)
Arnold Jeannesson (FRA)	15 January 1986 (aged 27)
Mathieu Ladagnous (FRA)	12 December 1984 (aged 29)
Johan Le Bon (FRA)	3 October 1990 (aged 23)

Rider	Date of birth
Pierre-Henri Lecuisinier (FRA)	30 June 1993 (aged 20)
Laurent Mangel (FRA)	22 May 1981 (aged 32)
Francis Mourey (FRA)	8 December 1980 (aged 33)
Yoann Offredo (FRA)	12 November 1986 (aged 27)
Laurent Pichon (FRA)	19 July 1986 (aged 27)
Cédric Pineau (FRA)	8 May 1985 (aged 28)
Thibaut Pinot (FRA)	29 May 1990 (aged 23)
Anthony Roux (FRA)	18 April 1987 (aged 26)
Jérémy Roy (FRA)	22 June 1983 (aged 30)
Geoffrey Soupe (FRA)	22 March 1988 (aged 25)
Benoît Vaugrenard (FRA)	5 January 1982 (aged 31)
Jussi Veikkanen (FIN)	29 March 1981 (aged 32)
Arthur Vichot (FRA)	26 November 1988 (aged 25)
Émilien Viennet (FRA)	6 February 1992 (aged 21)

Riders who joined the team for the 2014 season

Rider	2013 team
Sébastien Chavanel	Team Europcar
Pierre-Henri Lecuisinier	neo-pro (Vendée U)

Riders who left the team during or after the 2013 season

Rider	2014 team
Sandy Casar	Retired
Dominique Rollin	

== Season victories ==
Date	Race	Competition	Rider	Country	Location
6 February	Étoile de Bessèges, Stage 2	UCI Europe Tour	Nacer Bouhanni (FRA)	France	Saint-Ambroix
14 February	Tour of Qatar, Stage 6	UCI Asia Tour	Arnaud Démare (FRA)	Qatar	Doha Corniche
23 February	Tour du Haut Var, Young rider classification	UCI Europe Tour	Émilien Viennet (FRA)	France	
9 March	Paris–Nice, Stage 1	UCI World Tour	Nacer Bouhanni (FRA)	France	Mantes-la-Jolie
16 March	Paris–Nice, Stage 8	UCI World Tour	Arthur Vichot (FRA)	France	Nice
29 March	Critérium International, Stage 1	UCI Europe Tour	Nacer Bouhanni (FRA)	France	Porto-Vecchio
8 April	Circuit de la Sarthe, Stage 1	UCI Europe Tour	Nacer Bouhanni (FRA)	France	Saint-Géréon
11 April	Circuit de la Sarthe, Points classification	UCI Europe Tour	Nacer Bouhanni (FRA)	France	
17 April	Grand Prix de Denain	UCI Europe Tour	Nacer Bouhanni (FRA)	France	Denain
7 May	Four Days of Dunkirk, Stage 1	UCI Europe Tour	Arnaud Démare (FRA)	France	Coudekerque-Branche
8 May	Four Days of Dunkirk, Stage 2	UCI Europe Tour	Arnaud Démare (FRA)	France	Orchies
11 May	Four Days of Dunkirk, Overall	UCI Europe Tour	Arnaud Démare (FRA)	France	
11 May	Four Days of Dunkirk, Points classification	UCI Europe Tour	Arnaud Démare (FRA)	France	
11 May	Four Days of Dunkirk, Young rider classification	UCI Europe Tour	Arnaud Démare (FRA)	France	
13 May	Giro d'Italia, Stage 4	UCI World Tour	Nacer Bouhanni (FRA)	Italy	Bari
16 May	Giro d'Italia, Stage 7	UCI World Tour	Nacer Bouhanni (FRA)	Italy	Foligno
17 May	Tour de Picardie, Stage 2	UCI Europe Tour	Arnaud Démare (FRA)	France	Beaurieux–Chemin des Dames
18 May	Tour de Picardie, Stage 3	UCI Europe Tour	Arnaud Démare (FRA)	France	Bray-sur-Somme
18 May	Tour de Picardie, Overall	UCI Europe Tour	Arnaud Démare (FRA)	France	
18 May	Tour de Picardie, Points classification	UCI Europe Tour	Arnaud Démare (FRA)	France	
20 May	Giro d'Italia, Stage 10	UCI World Tour	Nacer Bouhanni (FRA)	Italy	Salsomaggiore Terme
1 June	Bayern–Rundfahrt, Young rider classification	UCI Europe Tour	Thibaut Pinot (FRA)	Germany	
1 June	Giro d'Italia, Points classification	UCI World Tour	Nacer Bouhanni (FRA)	Italy	
1 June	Giro d'Italia, Azzurri d'Italia classification	UCI World Tour	Nacer Bouhanni (FRA)	Italy	
25 June	Halle–Ingooigem	UCI Europe Tour	Arnaud Démare (FRA)	Belgium	Ingooigem
27 July	Tour de France, Young rider classification	UCI World Tour	Thibaut Pinot (FRA)	France	
14 August	Eneco Tour, Stage 4	UCI World Tour	Nacer Bouhanni (FRA)	Belgium	Ardooie
24 August	Vuelta a España, Stage 2	UCI World Tour	Nacer Bouhanni (FRA)	Spain	San Fernando
30 August	Vuelta a España, Stage 8	UCI World Tour	Nacer Bouhanni (FRA)	Spain	Alcaudete
19 September	Kampioenschap van Vlaanderen	UCI Europe Tour	Arnaud Démare (FRA)	Belgium	Koolskamp
21 September	Grand Prix d'Isbergues	UCI Europe Tour	Arnaud Démare (FRA)	France	Isbergues
28 September	Tour du Gévaudan Languedoc-Roussillon, Young rider classification	UCI Europe Tour	Thibaut Pinot (FRA)	France	
2 October	Tour de l'Eurométropole, Stage 1	UCI Europe Tour	Arnaud Démare (FRA)	Belgium	Kortrijk
3 October	Tour de l'Eurométropole, Stage 2	UCI Europe Tour	Arnaud Démare (FRA)	Belgium	Nieuwpoort
5 October	Tour de l'Eurométropole, Stage 4	UCI Europe Tour	Arnaud Démare (FRA)	Belgium	Tournai
5 October	Tour de l'Eurométropole, Overall	UCI Europe Tour	Arnaud Démare (FRA)	Belgium	
5 October	Tour de l'Eurométropole, Points classification	UCI Europe Tour	Arnaud Démare (FRA)	Belgium	
5 October	Tour de l'Eurométropole, Young rider classification	UCI Europe Tour	Arnaud Démare (FRA)	Belgium	
