= 2014 Ag2r–La Mondiale season =

Ag2r–La Mondiale
- 2014 season
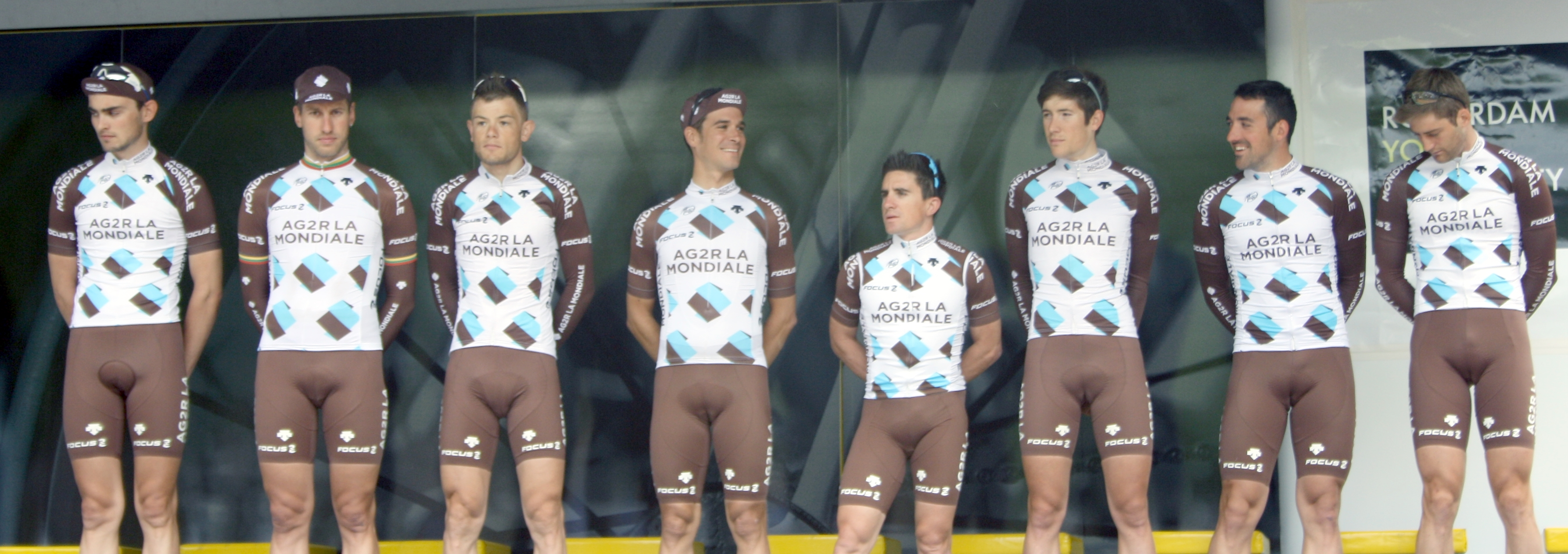
- The team at the 2014 World Ports Classic
- UCI code: ALM
- Status: UCI ProTeam
- World Tour Rank: 7th (919 points)
- Manager: Vincent Lavenu
- Main sponsor(s): Ag2r & La Mondiale
- Based: France
- Bicycles: Focus
- Groupset: Campagnolo

Season victories
- One-day races: 4
- Stage race overall: 3
- Stage race stages: 9
- National Championships: 1
- Most wins: Carlos Betancur (4 wins)
- Best ranked rider: Jean-Christophe Péraud (10th)

The 2014 season for the Ag2r–La Mondiale cycling team began in January at the Tour de San Luis. As a UCI ProTeam, they were automatically invited and obligated to send a squad to every event in the UCI World Tour.

== Team roster ==
As of 1 January 2014.

Rider	Date of birth
Davide Appollonio (ITA)	2 June 1989 (aged 24)
Gediminas Bagdonas (LTU)	26 December 1985 (aged 28)
Romain Bardet (FRA)	9 November 1990 (aged 23)
Julien Bérard (FRA)	2 July 1987 (aged 26)
Carlos Betancur (COL)	13 October 1989 (aged 24)
Guillaume Bonnafond (FRA)	23 June 1987 (aged 26)
Maxime Bouet (FRA)	3 November 1986 (aged 27)
Steve Chainel (FRA)	6 September 1983 (aged 30)
Mikaël Cherel (FRA)	17 March 1986 (aged 27)
Maxime Daniel (FRA)	5 June 1991 (aged 22)
Axel Domont (FRA)	7 August 1990 (aged 23)
Samuel Dumoulin (FRA)	20 August 1980 (aged 33)
Hubert Dupont (FRA)	13 November 1980 (aged 33)
Ben Gastauer (LUX)	14 November 1987 (aged 26)
Damien Gaudin (FRA)	20 August 1986 (aged 27)

Rider	Date of birth
Alexis Gougeard (FRA)	5 March 1993 (aged 20)
Patrick Gretsch (GER)	7 April 1987 (aged 26)
Hugo Houle (CAN)	27 September 1990 (aged 23)
Yauheni Hutarovich (BLR)	29 November 1983 (aged 30)
Blel Kadri (FRA)	3 September 1986 (aged 27)
Julian Kern (GER)	28 December 1989 (aged 24)
Sébastien Minard (FRA)	12 June 1982 (aged 31)
Lloyd Mondory (FRA)	26 April 1982 (aged 31)
Matteo Montaguti (ITA)	6 January 1984 (aged 29)
Rinaldo Nocentini (ITA)	25 September 1977 (aged 36)
Jean-Christophe Péraud (FRA)	22 May 1977 (aged 36)
Domenico Pozzovivo (ITA)	30 November 1982 (aged 31)
Christophe Riblon (FRA)	17 January 1981 (aged 32)
Sébastien Turgot (FRA)	11 April 1984 (aged 29)
Alexis Vuillermoz (FRA)	1 June 1988 (aged 25)

Riders who joined the team for the 2014 season

Rider	2013 team
Maxime Daniel	Sojasun
Damien Gaudin	Team Europcar
Alexis Gougeard	neo-pro (US Sainte-Austreberthe)
Patrick Gretsch	Argos–Shimano
Sébastien Turgot	Team Europcar
Alexis Vuillermoz	Sojasun

Riders who left the team during or after the 2013 season

Rider	2014 team
Manuel Belletti	Androni Giocattoli–Venezuela
John Gadret	Movistar Team
Sylvain Georges	Sacked
Valentin Iglinsky	Astana
Anthony Ravard	Retired

== Season victories ==
Date	Race	Competition	Rider	Country	Location
16 February	Tour Méditerranéen, Stage 5	UCI Europe Tour	Jean-Christophe Péraud (FRA)	France	Mont Faron
22 February	Tour du Haut Var, Stage 1	UCI Europe Tour	Carlos Betancur (COL)	France	La Croix-Valmer
23 February	Tour of Oman, Young rider classification	UCI Asia Tour	Romain Bardet (FRA)	Oman	
23 February	Tour du Haut Var, Overall	UCI Europe Tour	Carlos Betancur (COL)	France	
23 February	Tour du Haut Var, Points classification	UCI Europe Tour	Carlos Betancur (COL)	France	
23 February	Tour du Haut Var, Teams classification	UCI Europe Tour	(Note: The riders on the squad were Carlos Betancur, Maxime Bouet, Mikaël Cherel, Samuel Dumoulin, Hubert Dupont, Lloyd Mondory, Alexis Vuillermoz, and Alexis Gougeard)	France	
2 March	La Drôme Classic	UCI Europe Tour	Romain Bardet (FRA)	France	Valence
13 March	Paris–Nice, Stage 5	UCI World Tour	Carlos Betancur (COL)	France	Rive-de-Gier
14 March	Paris–Nice, Stage 6	UCI World Tour	Carlos Betancur (COL)	France	Fayence
16 March	Paris–Nice, Overall	UCI World Tour	Carlos Betancur (COL)	France	
16 March	Paris–Nice, Young rider classification	UCI World Tour	Carlos Betancur (COL)	France	
18 March	Tirreno–Adriatico, Teams classification	UCI World Tour	(Note: The riders on the squad were Domenico Pozzovivo, Davide Appollonio, Damien Gaudin, Patrick Gretsch, Lloyd Mondory, Matteo Montaguti, Rinaldo Nocentini, and Jean-Christophe Péraud)	Italy	
22 March	Classic Loire Atlantique	UCI Europe Tour	Alexis Gougeard (FRA)	France	La Haie-Fouassière
30 March	Critérium International, Overall	UCI Europe Tour	Jean-Christophe Péraud (FRA)	France	
11 April	Circuit de la Sarthe, Stage 5	UCI Europe Tour	Axel Domont (FRA)	France	La Ferté-Bernard
4 May	Grand Prix de la Somme	UCI Europe Tour	Yauheni Hutarovich (BLR)	France	Abbeville
11 May	Four Days of Dunkirk, Sprints classification	UCI Europe Tour	Gediminas Bagdonas (LTU)	France	
11 May	Four Days of Dunkirk, Teams classification	UCI Europe Tour	(Note: The riders on the squad were Samuel Dumoulin, Gediminas Bagdonas, Steve Chainel, Maxime Daniel, Hugo Houle, Blel Kadri, Sébastien Minard, and Lloyd Mondory)	France	
1 June	Giro d'Italia, Teams classification	UCI World Tour	(Note: The riders on the squad were Domenico Pozzovivo, Davide Appollonio, Julien Bérard, Maxime Bouet, Axel Domont, Hubert Dupont, Patrick Gretsch, Matteo Montaguti and Alexis Vuillermoz)	Italy	
1 June	Boucles de l'Aulne	UCI Europe Tour	Alexis Gougeard (FRA)	France	Châteaulin
22 June	Route du Sud, Mountains classification	UCI Europe Tour	Alexis Vuillermoz (FRA)	France	
22 June	Route du Sud, Sprints classification	UCI Europe Tour	Axel Domont (FRA)	France	
12 July	Tour de France, Stage 8	UCI World Tour	Blel Kadri (FRA)	France	Gérardmer La Mauselaine
27 July	Tour de France, Teams classification	UCI World Tour	(Note: The riders on the squad were Jean-Christophe Péraud, Romain Bardet, Mikaël Cherel, Samuel Dumoulin, Ben Gastauer, Blel Kadri, Sébastien Minard, Matteo Montaguti and Christophe Riblon)	France	
3 August	Tour de Pologne, Stage 1	UCI World Tour	Yauheni Hutarovich (BLR)	Poland	Bydgoszcz
9 August	Tour de Pologne, Points classification	UCI World Tour	Yauheni Hutarovich (BLR)	Poland	
16 August	Vuelta a Burgos, Stage 4	UCI Europe Tour	Lloyd Mondory (FRA)	Spain	Villarcayo
16 August	Tour de l'Ain, Teams classification	UCI Europe Tour	(Note: The riders on the squad were Romain Bardet, Julien Bérard, Guillaume Bonnafond, Maxime Bouet, Hubert Dupont and Jean-Christophe Péraud)	France	
22 August	Tour du Limousin, Sprints classification	UCI Europe Tour	Axel Domont (FRA)	France	
22 August	Tour du Limousin, Mountains classification	UCI Europe Tour	Axel Domont (FRA)	France	
28 September	Tour du Gévaudan Languedoc-Roussillon, Stage 2	UCI Europe Tour	Alexis Vuillermoz (FRA)	France	Mende
