= Argos Energies =

Petroleum company based in the Netherlands

Argos Energies Ltd.
- Industry: Oil and gas
- Predecessor: Van der Sluijs Groep; Goudvoort; Argos Oil; FNR+ Holding; North Sea Group
- Headquarters: Rotterdam, Netherlands
- Products: Refined products
- Services: Energy trading
- Website: argos.nl

Argos Energies Ltd. is an independent oil company based in Rotterdam, the Netherlands. The company also operates in Belgium, Luxembourg, Germany and France.

Argos Oil was founded in 1983 by Peter Goedvolk, who led it as CEO. It merged with North Sea Group on 25 October 2011, and in March 2012 Argos North Sea Group was founded. Since then, the new company has been the major sponsor of Argos-Shimano, a professional Dutch cycling team.

In 2015, Argos merged with VARO Energy, a company associated with Vitol.
