= 2014 La Flèche Wallonne =

2014 UCI World Tour, race 12 of 28

Race details
- Dates: 23 April 2014
- Stages: 1
- Distance: 199 km (123.7 mi)
- Winning time: 4h 36' 45"

Results
	Winner	Alejandro Valverde (Spain)	(Movistar Team)
	Second	Dan Martin (Ireland)	(Garmin–Sharp)
	Third	Michał Kwiatkowski (Poland)	(Omega Pharma–Quick-Step)

The 2014 La Flèche Wallonne was the 78th running of La Flèche Wallonne, a single-day cycling race. It was held on 23 April 2014 over a distance of 199 kilometres (123.7 miles) and it was the twelfth race of the 2014 UCI World Tour season. It was won for the second time by Spain's Alejandro Valverde, ahead of Ireland's Dan Martin and Poland's Michał Kwiatkowski.

== Teams ==
As La Flèche Wallonne was a UCI World Tour event, all 18 UCI ProTeams were invited automatically and obligated to send a squad. Seven other squads were given wildcard places, thus completing the 25-team peloton.

The 25 teams that competed in the race were:

- Ag2r–La Mondiale
- Astana
- Belkin Pro Cycling
- BMC Racing Team
- Cannondale
- Cofidis
- Colombia
- Team Europcar
- FDJ.fr
- Garmin–Sharp
- Giant–Shimano
- IAM Cycling
- Team Katusha
- Lampre–Merida
- Lotto–Belisol
- Movistar Team
- MTN–Qhubeka
- Omega Pharma–Quick-Step
- Orica–GreenEDGE
- Team Sky
- Tinkoff–Saxo
- Topsport Vlaanderen–Baloise
- Trek Factory Racing
- UnitedHealthcare
- Wanty–Groupe Gobert

== Results ==
	Cyclist	Team	Time	World Tour Points
1	Alejandro Valverde (ESP)	Movistar Team	4h 36' 45"	80
2	Dan Martin (IRL)	Garmin–Sharp	+ 3"	60
3	Michał Kwiatkowski (POL)	Omega Pharma–Quick-Step	+ 4"	50
4	Bauke Mollema (NED)	Belkin Pro Cycling	+ 4"	40
5	Tom-Jelte Slagter (NED)	Garmin–Sharp	+ 6"	30
6	Jelle Vanendert (BEL)	Lotto–Belisol	+ 6"	22
7	Michael Albasini (SUI)	Orica–GreenEDGE	+ 8"	14
8	Roman Kreuziger (CZE)	Tinkoff–Saxo	+ 8"	10
9	Daniel Moreno (ESP)	Team Katusha	+ 11"	6
10	Philippe Gilbert (BEL)	BMC Racing Team	+ 15"	2
