= Julián Arredondo =

Colombian cyclist

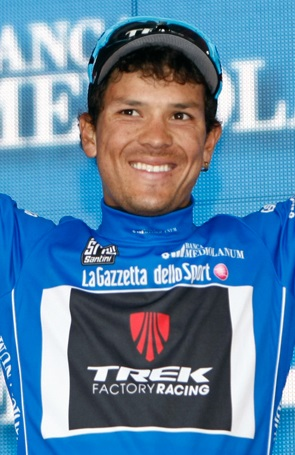
- Arredondo at the 2014 Giro d'Italia

Personal information
- Full name: Julián David Arredondo Moreno
- Nickname: Perico
- Born: 30 July 1988 (age 38) Ciudad Bolívar, Colombia
- Height: 1.64 m (5 ft 5 in)
- Weight: 58 kg (128 lb)

Cycling career
- Sport: Cycling
- Current team: Retired
- Discipline: Road
- Role: Rider
- Rider type: Climbing specialist

Amateur teams
- 2008–2009: Massi–Euronics
- 2010–2011: SCAP Prefabbricati Foresi

Professional teams
- 2012–2013: Team Nippo
- 2014–2016: Trek Factory Racing
- 2017: Nippo–Vini Fantini

Major wins
- Grand Tours Giro d'Italia Mountains classification (2014) 1 individual stage (2014) Stage races Tour de Langkawi (2013) Other UCI Asia Tour (2012–13)

Julián David Arredondo Moreno (born 30 July 1988) is a Colombian former professional road cyclist, who rode professionally between 2012 and 2017 for the Trek–Segafredo and Nippo–Vini Fantini teams. Arredondo is best known for winning the mountains classification at the 2014 Giro d'Italia, as well as the 2012–13 UCI Asia Tour standings. He also competed at the 2014 Vuelta a España and the 2015 Tour de France.

== Major results ==
2006
1st Road race, National Junior Road Championships
2007
1st Stage 1 Clásica Marinilla
2008
10th GP Capodarco
2010
1st GP Folignano — Trofeo Avis
3rd GP Capodarco
2011
5th Trofeo Internazionale Bastianelli
5th Gran Premio San Giuseppe
6th GP Capodarco
9th Gran Premio Folignano
2012
2nd Overall Tour of Japan

1st Mountains classification
1st Stage 3

2nd Overall Tour de Kumano

1st Mountains classification

4th Japan Cup
2013 (2 pro wins)
1st Overall UCI Asia Tour
1st Overall Tour de Langkawi

1st Stage 5

1st Overall Tour de Kumano

1st Mountains classification
1st Stage 2

2nd Overall Tour of Japan

1st Young rider classification

3rd Japan Cup
10th Giro dell'Appennino
2014 (3)
Giro d'Italia

1st Mountains classification
1st Stage 18

3rd Gran Premio Città di Camaiore
4th Overall Tour de San Luis

1st Stages 2 & 6

5th Overall Tirreno–Adriatico
5th Japan Cup
7th Overall Tour of Beijing
8th Classic Sud-Ardèche
2015
8th Overall Critérium International
9th Overall Tour of Oman
2016
10th Classic Sud-Ardèche

=== General classification results timeline ===
Grand Tour general classification results
Grand Tour	2014	2015	2016	2017
Giro d'Italia	61	—	—	—
Tour de France	—	124	—	—
Vuelta a España	DNF	—	—	—
Major stage race general classification results
Race	2014	2015	2016	2017
Paris–Nice	—	—	—	—
Tirreno–Adriatico	5	49	—	DNF
Volta a Catalunya	DNF	—	DNF	—
Tour of the Basque Country	—	69	—	—
Tour de Romandie	—	—	DNF	—
Critérium du Dauphiné	—	—	—	—
Tour de Suisse	—	34	—	—
