= 2014 Tour of Beijing =

2014 UCI World Tour, race 29 of 29

Race details
- Dates: 10–14 October 2014
- Stages: 5

Results
Jersey awarded to the overall winner	Winner	Philippe Gilbert (Belgium)	(BMC Racing Team)
	Second	Dan Martin (Republic of Ireland)	(Garmin–Sharp)
	Third	Esteban Chaves (Colombia)	(Orica–GreenEDGE)
Jersey awarded to the points classification winner	Points	Tyler Farrar (United States)	(Garmin–Sharp)
Jersey awarded to the mountains classification winner	Mountains	Michał Gołaś (Poland)	(Omega Pharma–Quick-Step)
Jersey awarded to the youth classification winner	Youth	Esteban Chaves (Colombia)	(Orica–GreenEDGE)
	Team	Orica–GreenEDGE	

The 2014 Tour of Beijing was the fourth and final running of the Tour of Beijing stage race. It started on 10 October in Hebei's Chongli County and ended on 14 October at the Bird's Nest Piazza after five stages. It was the 29th and final race of the 2014 UCI World Tour season.

At the 2014 UCI Road World Championships in September, cycling's governing body, the Union Cycliste Internationale (UCI), decided that its race-organising subsidiary, Global Cycling Promotion, would not continue to organise the Tour of Beijing; the 2014 edition would be the final edition. UCI President Brian Cookson had criticised the subsidiary body during his election campaign, and the Tour of Beijing was not seen as being well-liked by cyclists. According to Cycling Weekly, "Dull routes and an absence of roadside spectators meant the race failed to exhibit much of an atmosphere, and its position at the very end of the calendar made it even less appealing – a long flight eastwards after a whole season's racing is a very tough sell to exhausted cyclists dreaming of the winter off."

Some issues presented themselves before and during the race. On September 10 it emerged that Valentin Iglinsky of Astana Pro Team had returned a positive test for EPO at the Eneco Tour. He confessed to doping to the team and was immediately sacked, three weeks later Valentin's brother, Maxim Iglinsky was provisionally suspended by the UCI for an EPO positive on August 1. It was later announced that Astana withdrew themselves from the Tour of Beijing in line with the Mouvement pour un cyclisme crédible rules, which state that a team with two positives in a short period of time must not participate in the next World Tour event. There was also the prospect of two Grand Tour winners – Alberto Contador and Alejandro Valverde attending the race with serious winning intentions – with Contador bidding to overhaul his fellow Spaniard Valverde's lead at the top of the overall points standings of the World Tour. However, the combination of Valverde's success and Contador's injury at the Giro di Lombardia, the previous race on the calendar, meant that in the end neither cyclist attended the Tour of Beijing. During the race, Beijing was hit with particularly strong pollution problems, and after complaints from cyclists, stage 2 of the Tour was shortened.

== Schedule ==
Stage	Date	Course	Distance	Type	Winner
1	10 October	Chong Li to Zhangjiakou	167.0 km (103.8 mi)	Flat stage	Luka Mezgec (SLO)
2	11 October	Chong Li to Yanqing	111.0 km (69.0 mi)	Flat stage	Philippe Gilbert (BEL)
3	12 October	Yanqing to Qianjiandian	176.0 km (109.4 mi)	Medium mountain stage	Tyler Farrar (USA)
4	13 October	Yanqing to Mentougou Miaofeng Mountain	157.0 km (97.6 mi)	Mountain stage	Dan Martin (IRL)
5	14 October	Tiananmen Square to Bird's Nest Piazza	117.0 km (73 mi)	Flat stage	Sacha Modolo (ITA)

== Participating teams ==
As the Tour of Beijing is a UCI World Tour event, all eighteen UCI ProTeams were invited automatically and obligated to send a squad. Because of Astana's self-suspension (see above), only seventeen teams were able to attend. With Astana's absence, Vacansoleil–DCM folding at the end of the previous season, and no wild-card team invited, this represented a big decrease from the 20 teams of the 2013 Tour of Beijing.

The seventeen teams that competed in the race were:

- Ag2r–La Mondiale
- Belkin Pro Cycling
- BMC Racing Team
- Cannondale
- Team Europcar
- FDJ.fr
- Garmin–Sharp
- Giant–Shimano
- Team Katusha
- Lampre–Merida
- Lotto–Belisol
- Movistar Team
- Omega Pharma–Quick-Step
- Orica–GreenEDGE
- Team Sky
- Tinkoff–Saxo
- Trek Factory Racing

== Stages ==
=== Stage 1 ===
10 October 2014 — Chong Li to Zhangjiakou, 167 km (103.8 mi)

Stage 1 result

	Rider	Team	Time
1	Luka Mezgec (SLO)	Giant–Shimano	4h 22' 58"
2	Caleb Ewan (AUS)	Orica–GreenEDGE	+ 0"
3	Tyler Farrar (USA)	Garmin–Sharp	+ 0"
4	Sacha Modolo (ITA)	Lampre–Merida	+ 0"
5	Nikolas Maes (BEL)	Omega Pharma–Quick-Step	+ 0"
6	Moreno Hofland (NED)	Belkin Pro Cycling	+ 0"
7	Steele Von Hoff (AUS)	Garmin–Sharp	+ 0"
8	Boy van Poppel (NED)	Trek Factory Racing	+ 0"
9	Davide Appollonio (ITA)	Ag2r–La Mondiale	+ 0"
10	Olivier Le Gac (FRA)	FDJ.fr	+ 0"

General Classification after Stage 1

	Rider	Team	Time
1	Luka Mezgec (SLO)	Giant–Shimano	4h 22' 48"
2	Caleb Ewan (AUS)	Orica–GreenEDGE	+ 4"
3	Julian Kern (GER)	Ag2r–La Mondiale	+ 5"
4	Tyler Farrar (USA)	Garmin–Sharp	+ 6"
5	Jérémy Roy (FRA)	FDJ.fr	+ 6"
6	Tosh Van der Sande (BEL)	Lotto–Belisol	+ 8"
7	Philippe Gilbert (BEL)	BMC Racing Team	+ 9"
8	Sacha Modolo (ITA)	Lampre–Merida	+ 10"
9	Nikolas Maes (BEL)	Omega Pharma–Quick-Step	+ 10"
10	Moreno Hofland (NED)	Belkin Pro Cycling	+ 10"

=== Stage 2 ===
11 October 2014 — Chong Li to Yanqing, 111 km (69.0 mi)

Stage 2 result

	Rider	Team	Time
1	Philippe Gilbert (BEL)	BMC Racing Team	2h 29' 02"
2	Reinardt Janse van Rensburg (RSA)	Giant–Shimano	+ 0"
3	Rui Costa (POR)	Lampre–Merida	+ 0"
4	Sergey Chernetskiy (RUS)	Team Katusha	+ 0"
5	Dan Martin (IRL)	Garmin–Sharp	+ 0"
6	Pieter Serry (BEL)	Omega Pharma–Quick-Step	+ 0"
7	Jesús Herrada (ESP)	Movistar Team	+ 0"
8	Esteban Chaves (COL)	Orica–GreenEDGE	+ 0"
9	Daryl Impey (RSA)	Orica–GreenEDGE	+ 0"
10	Mikaël Cherel (FRA)	Ag2r–La Mondiale	+ 0"

General Classification after Stage 2

	Rider	Team	Time
1	Philippe Gilbert (BEL)	BMC Racing Team	6h 51' 49"
2	Reinardt Janse van Rensburg (RSA)	Giant–Shimano	+ 5"
3	Rui Costa (POR)	Lampre–Merida	+ 7"
4	Jesús Herrada (ESP)	Movistar Team	+ 11"
5	Pieter Serry (BEL)	Omega Pharma–Quick-Step	+ 11"
6	Mikaël Cherel (FRA)	Ag2r–La Mondiale	+ 11"
7	Sergey Chernetskiy (RUS)	Team Katusha	+ 11"
8	Rigoberto Urán (COL)	Omega Pharma–Quick-Step	+ 11"
9	Warren Barguil (FRA)	Giant–Shimano	+ 11"
10	Julián Arredondo (COL)	Trek Factory Racing	+ 11"

=== Stage 3 ===
12 October 2014 — Yanqing to Qianjiandian, 176.0 km (109.4 mi)

Stage 3 result

	Rider	Team	Time
1	Tyler Farrar (USA)	Garmin–Sharp	4h 15' 46"
2	Luka Mezgec (SLO)	Giant–Shimano	+ 0"
3	Nikolas Maes (BEL)	Omega Pharma–Quick-Step	+ 0"
4	Moreno Hofland (NED)	Belkin Pro Cycling	+ 0"
5	Maximiliano Richeze (ARG)	Lampre–Merida	+ 0"
6	Edvald Boasson Hagen (NOR)	Team Sky	+ 0"
7	Danny van Poppel (NED)	Trek Factory Racing	+ 0"
8	Boy van Poppel (NED)	Trek Factory Racing	+ 0"
9	Davide Appollonio (ITA)	Ag2r–La Mondiale	+ 0"
10	Caleb Ewan (AUS)	Orica–GreenEDGE	+ 0"

General Classification after Stage 3

	Rider	Team	Time
1	Philippe Gilbert (BEL)	BMC Racing Team	11h 07' 35"
2	Reinardt Janse van Rensburg (RSA)	Giant–Shimano	+ 5"
3	Rui Costa (POR)	Lampre–Merida	+ 7"
4	Daryl Impey (RSA)	Orica–GreenEDGE	+ 9"
5	Jesús Herrada (ESP)	Movistar Team	+ 10"
6	Luka Mezgec (SLO)	Giant–Shimano	+ 11"
7	Pieter Serry (BEL)	Omega Pharma–Quick-Step	+ 11"
8	Sergey Chernetskiy (RUS)	Team Katusha	+ 11"
9	Mikaël Cherel (FRA)	Ag2r–La Mondiale	+ 11"
10	Warren Barguil (FRA)	Giant–Shimano	+ 11"

=== Stage 4 ===
13 October 2014 — Yanqing to Mentougou Miaofeng Mountain, 157.0 km (97.6 mi)

Stage 4 result

	Rider	Team	Time
1	Dan Martin (IRL)	Garmin–Sharp	4h 12' 14"
2	Esteban Chaves (COL)	Orica–GreenEDGE	+ 2"
3	Philippe Gilbert (BEL)	BMC Racing Team	+ 2"
4	Rui Costa (POR)	Lampre–Merida	+ 2"
5	Julián Arredondo (COL)	Trek Factory Racing	+ 10"
6	Rinaldo Nocentini (ITA)	Ag2r–La Mondiale	+ 10"
7	Warren Barguil (FRA)	Giant–Shimano	+ 10"
8	Rigoberto Urán (COL)	Omega Pharma–Quick-Step	+ 10"
9	Sergey Chernetskiy (RUS)	Team Katusha	+ 10"
10	David López (ESP)	Team Sky	+ 13"

General Classification after Stage 4

	Rider	Team	Time
1	Philippe Gilbert (BEL)	BMC Racing Team	15h 19' 47"
2	Dan Martin (IRL)	Garmin–Sharp	+ 3"
3	Esteban Chaves (COL)	Orica–GreenEDGE	+ 9"
4	Rui Costa (POR)	Lampre–Merida	+ 11"
5	Sergey Chernetskiy (RUS)	Team Katusha	+ 23"
6	Warren Barguil (FRA)	Giant–Shimano	+ 23"
7	Julián Arredondo (COL)	Trek Factory Racing	+ 23"
8	Rinaldo Nocentini (ITA)	Ag2r–La Mondiale	+ 23"
9	Rigoberto Urán (COL)	Omega Pharma–Quick-Step	+ 23"
10	Pieter Serry (BEL)	Omega Pharma–Quick-Step	+ 26"

=== Stage 5 ===
14 October 2014 — Tiananmen Square to Bird's Nest Piazza, 117 km (72.7 mi)

Stage 5 result

	Rider	Team	Time
1	Sacha Modolo (ITA)	Lampre–Merida	2h 40' 10"
2	Greg Henderson (NZL)	Lotto–Belisol	+ 0"
3	Edvald Boasson Hagen (NOR)	Team Sky	+ 0"
4	Tyler Farrar (USA)	Garmin–Sharp	+ 0"
5	Moreno Hofland (NED)	Belkin Pro Cycling	+ 0"
6	Luka Mezgec (SLO)	Giant–Shimano	+ 0"
7	Davide Appollonio (ITA)	Ag2r–La Mondiale	+ 0"
8	Ben Swift (GBR)	Team Sky	+ 0"
9	Caleb Ewan (AUS)	Orica–GreenEDGE	+ 0"
10	Enrique Sanz (ESP)	Movistar Team	+ 0"

Final General Classification

	Rider	Team	Time
1	Philippe Gilbert (BEL)	BMC Racing Team	17h 59' 57"
2	Dan Martin (IRL)	Garmin–Sharp	+ 3"
3	Esteban Chaves (COL)	Orica–GreenEDGE	+ 9"
4	Rui Costa (POR)	Lampre–Merida	+ 11"
5	Sergey Chernetskiy (RUS)	Team Katusha	+ 23"
6	Warren Barguil (FRA)	Giant–Shimano	+ 23"
7	Julián Arredondo (COL)	Trek Factory Racing	+ 23"
8	Rinaldo Nocentini (ITA)	Ag2r–La Mondiale	+ 23"
9	Rigoberto Urán (COL)	Omega Pharma–Quick-Step	+ 23"
10	Mikaël Cherel (FRA)	Ag2r–La Mondiale	+ 26"

== Classification leadership table ==
Stage	Winner	General classification	Points classification	Mountains classification	Young rider classification	Team Classification
1	Luka Mezgec	Luka Mezgec	Luka Mezgec	Tosh Van der Sande	Caleb Ewan	Giant–Shimano
2	Philippe Gilbert	Philippe Gilbert	Philippe Gilbert	Tosh Van der Sande	Jesús Herrada	Omega Pharma–Quick-Step
3	Tyler Farrar	Philippe Gilbert	Tyler Farrar	Michał Gołaś	Jesús Herrada	Giant–Shimano
4	Dan Martin	Philippe Gilbert	Luka Mezgec	Michał Gołaś	Esteban Chaves	Orica–GreenEDGE
5	Sacha Modolo	Philippe Gilbert	Tyler Farrar	Michał Gołaś	Esteban Chaves	Orica–GreenEDGE
Final		Philippe Gilbert	Tyler Farrar	Michał Gołaś	Esteban Chaves	Orica–GreenEDGE
