= 2014 Giro di Lombardia =

Giro di Lombardia 2014
2014 UCI World Tour
- Official event poster

Race details
- Dates: 5 October 2014
- Stages: 1
- Distance: 254 km (158 mi)
- Winning time: 6h 25' 33"

Results
	Winner	Daniel Martin (IRL)	(Garmin–Sharp)
	Second	Alejandro Valverde (ESP)	(Movistar Team)
	Third	Rui Costa (POR)	(Lampre–Merida)

The 2014 Giro di Lombardia or 2014 Il Lombardia was the 108th edition of the Giro di Lombardia single-day cycling race, often known as the Race of the Falling Leaves. It was held on 5 October 2014 over a distance of 254 km. The course was different from years past, and it finished in Bergamo. The race was won by Daniel Martin ahead of Alejandro Valverde and Rui Costa.

== Results ==
	Cyclist	Team	Time	UCI World Tour Points
1	Daniel Martin (IRL)	Garmin–Sharp	6h 25' 33”	100
2	Alejandro Valverde (ESP)	Movistar Team	+1"	80
3	Rui Costa (POR)	Lampre–Merida	+1"	70
4	Tim Wellens (BEL)	Lotto–Belisol	+1"	60
5	Samuel Sánchez (ESP)	BMC Racing Team	+1"	50
6	Michael Albasini (SUI)	Orica–GreenEDGE	+1"	40
7	Philippe Gilbert (BEL)	BMC Racing Team	+1"	30
8	Joaquim Rodríguez (ESP)	Team Katusha	+1"	20
9	Fabio Aru (ITA)	Astana	+1"	10
10	Rinaldo Nocentini (ITA)	Ag2r–La Mondiale	+14"	4
