= 2013–14 UCI America Tour =

Bicycle competition

- Tenth edition of the UCI America Tour

Details
- Dates: 6 October 2013–25 December 2014
- Location: North America and South America
- Races: 29

Champions
- Individual champion: Juan Carlos Rojas (CRC)
- Teams' champion: Team SmartStop
- Nations' champion: United States

The 2013–14 UCI America Tour was the tenth season for the UCI America Tour. The season began on 6 October 2013 with the Tobago Cycling Classic and ended on 25 December 2014 with the Vuelta a Costa Rica.

The points leader, based on the cumulative results of previous races, wears the UCI America Tour cycling jersey. Janier Acevedo from Colombia is the defending champion of the 2012–13 UCI America Tour.

Throughout the season, points are awarded to the top finishers of stages within stage races and the final general classification standings of each of the stages races and one-day events. The quality and complexity of a race also determines how many points are awarded to the top finishers, the higher the UCI rating of a race, the more points are awarded.

The UCI ratings from highest to lowest are as follows:

- Multi-day events: 2.HC, 2.1 and 2.2
- One-day events: 1.HC, 1.1 and 1.2

== Events ==
=== 2013 ===
Date	Race Name	Location	UCI Rating	Winner	Team
6 October	Tobago Cycling Classic	Trinidad and Tobago	1.2	Jaime Ramírez (COL)	Team Cocos
1–10 November	Vuelta a Bolivia	Bolivia	2.2	Salvador Moreno (COL)	Colombia-Coldeportes
18–29 December	Vuelta a Costa Rica	Costa Rica	2.2	Juan Carlos Rojas (CRC)	JPS-Giant

=== 2014 ===
Date	Race Name	Location	UCI Rating	Winner	Team
10–19 January	Vuelta al Táchira	Venezuela	2.2	Jimmy Briceño (VEN)	Lotería del Táchira
20–26 January	Tour de San Luis	Argentina	2.1	Nairo Quintana (COL)	Movistar Team
9–16 February	Tour do Brasil	Brazil	2.2	Magno Nazaret (BRA)	Funvic Brasilinvest–São José dos Campos
20–27 February	Vuelta a la Independencia Nacional	Dominican Republic	2.2	Edwin Sánchez (COL)	Formesán-Bogotá Humana-ETB
4–9 March	Vuelta Mexico	Mexico	2.2	Juan Pablo Villegas (COL)	4-72 Colombia
9–13 April	Volta do Rio Grande do Sul	Brazil	2.2	José Luis Rodríguez (CHI)	Clos de Pirque-Trek
18 April	Winston-Salem Classic	United States	1.2	Travis McCabe (USA)	Team SmartStop
23–27 April	Volta do Paraná	Brazil	2.2	Carlos Manarelli (BRA)	Funvic Brasilinvest–São José dos Campos
30 April–4 May	Tour of the Gila	United States	2.2	Carter Jones (USA)	Optum–Kelly Benefit Strategies
8 May	Pan American Cycling Championships – TT	Mexico	CC	Pedro Herrera (COL)	Colombia (national team)
11 May	Pan American Cycling Championships – RR	Mexico	CC	Byron Guamá (ECU)	Ecuador (national team)
11–18 May	Tour of California	United States	2.HC	Bradley Wiggins (GBR)	Team Sky
1 June	The Philadelphia Cycling Classic	United States	1.1	Kiel Reijnen (USA)	UnitedHealthcare
6–8 June	Grand Prix Cycliste de Saguenay	Canada	2.2	Jure Kocjan (SLO)	Team SmartStop
10–15 June	Tour de Beauce	Canada	2.2	Toms Skujiņš (LAT)	Hincapie Sportswear Development Team
4–13 July	Vuelta a Venezuela	Venezuela	2.2	Yonathan Salinas (VEN)	Kino Táchira-Royal Bike
6 July	Tour de Delta	Canada	1.2	Jesse Anthony (USA)	Optum–Kelly Benefit Strategies
1–10 August	Tour de Guadeloupe	Guadeloupe	2.1	John Nava (VEN)	Venezuela (national team)
4–10 August	Tour of Utah	United States	2.1	Tom Danielson (USA)	Garmin–Sharp
6–17 August	Vuelta a Colombia	Colombia	2.2	Óscar Sevilla (ESP)	EPM–UNE–Área Metropolitana
13–17 August	Vuelta al Sur de Bolivia	Bolivia	2.2	Juan Cotumba (BOL)	Pollito Rico
18–24 August	USA Pro Cycling Challenge	United States	2.HC	Tejay van Garderen (USA)	BMC Racing Team
26–31 Aug	Tour do Rio	Brazil	2.1	Óscar Sevilla (ESP)	EPM–UNE–Área Metropolitana
2–7 September	Tour of Alberta	Canada	2.1	Daryl Impey (RSA)	Orica–GreenEDGE
13 September	Bucks County Classic	United States	1.2	Zach Bell (CAN)	Team SmartStop
6 October	Tobago Cycling Classic	Trinidad and Tobago	1.2	Óscar Pachón (COL)	Team Coco's
25 Oct–1 Nov	Vuelta a Guatemala	Guatemala	2.2	Alex Caño (COL)	Orgullo Antioqueño
14–25 December	Vuelta a Costa Rica	Costa Rica	2.2	Juan Carlos Rojas (CRC)	Frijoles Los Tierniticos-Arroz Halcón
