= 2014 BMC Racing Team season =

BMC Racing Team
- 2014 season
- Manager: Jim Ochowicz

Season victories
- One-day races: 5
- Stage race overall: 6
- Stage race stages: 17
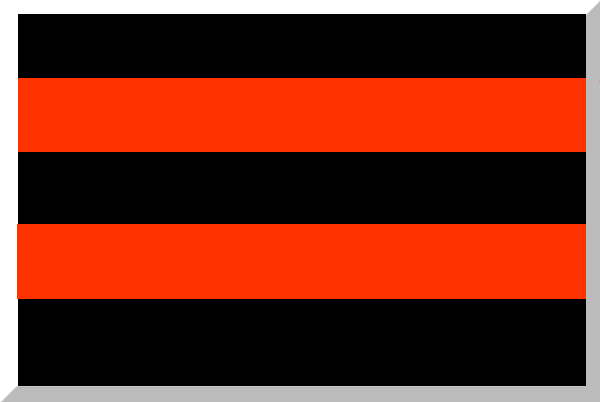
- Jersey

The 2014 season for the BMC Racing Team began in January with the Tour de San Luis. As a UCI ProTeam, they were automatically invited and obligated to send a squad to every event in the UCI World Tour.

== Team roster ==
As of August 3, 2014.

Rider	Date of birth
Darwin Atapuma (COL)	January 15, 1988 (aged 25)
Alessandro Ballan (Note: Ballan was fired by the team on January 17, following his two-year doping ban.) (ITA)	November 6, 1979 (aged 34)
Brent Bookwalter (USA)	February 16, 1984 (aged 29)
Marcus Burghardt (GER)	June 30, 1983 (aged 30)
Steve Cummings (GBR)	March 19, 1981 (aged 32)
Rohan Dennis (Note: Dennis joined the team on August 1.) (AUS)	May 28, 1990 (aged 23)
Silvan Dillier (SUI)	August 3, 1990 (aged 23)
Yannick Eijssen (BEL)	June 26, 1989 (aged 24)
Cadel Evans (AUS)	February 14, 1977 (aged 36)
Philippe Gilbert (BEL)	July 5, 1982 (aged 31)
Ben Hermans (BEL)	June 8, 1986 (aged 27)
Thor Hushovd (NOR)	January 18, 1978 (aged 35)
Martin Kohler (SUI)	July 17, 1985 (aged 28)
Sebastian Lander (DEN)	March 11, 1991 (aged 22)
Klaas Lodewyck (BEL)	March 24, 1988 (aged 25)

Rider	Date of birth
Amaël Moinard (FRA)	February 2, 1982 (aged 31)
Steve Morabito (SUI)	January 30, 1983 (aged 30)
Dominik Nerz (GER)	August 25, 1989 (aged 24)
Daniel Oss (ITA)	January 13, 1987 (aged 26)
Taylor Phinney (USA)	June 27, 1990 (aged 23)
Manuel Quinziato (ITA)	October 30, 1979 (aged 34)
Samuel Sánchez (Note: Sánchez joined the team on February 2.) (ESP)	February 5, 1978 (aged 35)
Michael Schär (SUI)	September 29, 1986 (aged 27)
Peter Stetina (USA)	August 8, 1987 (aged 26)
Greg Van Avermaet (BEL)	May 17, 1985 (aged 28)
Tejay van Garderen (USA)	August 12, 1988 (aged 25)
Peter Velits (SVK)	August 12, 1985 (aged 28)
Larry Warbasse (USA)	June 28, 1990 (aged 23)
Danilo Wyss (SUI)	August 26, 1985 (aged 28)
Rick Zabel (GER)	December 7, 1993 (aged 20)

Riders who joined the team for the 2014 season

Rider	2013 team
Darwin Atapuma	Colombia
Silvan Dillier	neo-pro (stagiaire, BMC Racing Team)
Ben Hermans	RadioShack–Leopard
Peter Stetina	Garmin–Sharp
Peter Velits	Omega Pharma–Quick-Step
Rick Zabel	neo-pro (Rabobank Development Team)

Riders who left the team during or after the 2013 season

Rider	2014 team
Adam Blythe	NFTO Pro Cycling
Mathias Frank	IAM Cycling
Marco Pinotti	Retired
Ivan Santaromita	Orica–GreenEDGE

== Season victories ==
Date	Race	Competition	Rider	Country	Location
January 23	Tour Down Under, Stage 3	UCI World Tour	Cadel Evans (AUS)	Australia	Campbelltown
February 5	Dubai Tour, Stage 1	UCI Asia Tour	Taylor Phinney (USA)	United Arab Emirates	Dubai
February 8	Dubai Tour, Overall	UCI Asia Tour	Taylor Phinney (USA)	United Arab Emirates	
February 8	Dubai Tour, Young rider classification	UCI Asia Tour	Taylor Phinney (USA)	United Arab Emirates	
February 15	Tour Méditerranéen, Stage 4	UCI Europe Tour	Steve Cummings (GBR)	France	Saint-Rémy-de-Provence
February 16	Tour Méditerranéen, Overall	UCI Europe Tour	Steve Cummings (GBR)	France	
February 16	Tour Méditerranéen, Teams classification	UCI Europe Tour	(Note: The riders on the squad were Steve Cummings, Amaël Moinard, Yannick Eijssen, Ben Hermans, Thor Hushovd, Klaas Lodewyck, Taylor Phinney, and Larry Warbasse)	France	
February 23	Tour du Haut Var, Stage 2	UCI Europe Tour	Amaël Moinard (FRA)	France	Draguignan
March 27	Volta a Catalunya, Stage 4	UCI World Tour	Tejay van Garderen (USA)	Spain	Vallter 2000–Setcases
April 12	Tour of the Basque Country, Teams classification	UCI World Tour	(Note: The riders on the squad were Cadel Evans, Philippe Gilbert, Samuel Sánchez, Darwin Atapuma, Amaël Moinard, Dominik Nerz, Tejay van Garderen, and Peter Velits)	Spain	
April 16	Brabantse Pijl	UCI Europe Tour	Philippe Gilbert (BEL)	Belgium	Overijse
April 20	Amstel Gold Race	UCI World Tour	Philippe Gilbert (BEL)	Netherlands	Valkenburg
April 22	Giro del Trentino, Stage 1	UCI Europe Tour	Team time trial (Note: The riders on the squad were Cadel Evans, Yannick Eijssen, Brent Bookwalter, Martin Kohler, Sebastian Lander, Steve Morabito, Daniel Oss and Rick Zabel)	Italy	Arco
April 24	Giro del Trentino, Stage 3	UCI Europe Tour	Cadel Evans (AUS)	Italy	Roncone
April 25	Giro del Trentino, Overall	UCI Europe Tour	Cadel Evans (AUS)	Italy	
May 4	Tour de Romandie, Sprints classification	UCI World Tour	Martin Kohler (SUI)	Switzerland	
May 15	Tour of California, Stage 5	UCI America Tour	Taylor Phinney (USA)	United States	Santa Barbara
May 18	Tour de Picardie, Mountains classification	UCI Europe Tour	Philippe Gilbert (BEL)	France	
June 1	Tour of Belgium, Points classification	UCI Europe Tour	Philippe Gilbert (BEL)	Belgium	
June 18	Ster ZLM Toer, Prologue	UCI Europe Tour	Philippe Gilbert (BEL)	Netherlands	Bladel
June 21	Ster ZLM Toer, Stage 4	UCI Europe Tour	Philippe Gilbert (BEL)	Netherlands	La Gileppe
June 22	Ster ZLM Toer, Overall	UCI Europe Tour	Philippe Gilbert (BEL)	Netherlands	
July 30	Tour de Wallonie, Young rider classification	UCI Europe Tour	Silvan Dillier (SUI)	Belgium	
August 5	Tour of Utah, Stage 2	UCI America Tour	Michael Schär (SUI)	United States	Torrey
August 9	Tour of Utah, Stage 6	UCI America Tour	Cadel Evans (AUS)	United States	Snowbird
August 10	Tour of Utah, Stage 7	UCI America Tour	Cadel Evans (AUS)	United States	Park City
August 10	Tour of Utah, Young rider classification	UCI America Tour	Dylan Teuns (BEL)	United States	
August 15	Eneco Tour, Stage 5	UCI World Tour	Greg Van Avermaet (BEL)	Belgium	Geraardsbergen
August 20	USA Pro Cycling Challenge, Stage 3	UCI America Tour	Tejay van Garderen (USA)	United States	Monarch Mountain
August 23	USA Pro Cycling Challenge, Stage 6	UCI America Tour	Tejay van Garderen (USA)	United States	Vail
August 24	USA Pro Cycling Challenge, Overall	UCI America Tour	Tejay van Garderen (USA)	United States	
August 24	USA Pro Cycling Challenge, Teams classification	UCI America Tour	(Note: The riders on the squad were Tejay van Garderen, Brent Bookwalter, Yannick Eijssen, Martin Kohler, Ben Hermans, Michael Schär, Peter Stetina, and Rick Zabel)	United States	
September 14	Tour of Britain, Sprints classification	UCI Europe Tour	Sebastian Lander (DEN)	United Kingdom	
September 17	Grand Prix de Wallonie	UCI Europe Tour	Greg Van Avermaet (BEL)	Belgium	Namur
September 20	GP Impanis-Van Petegem	UCI Europe Tour	Greg Van Avermaet (BEL)	Belgium	Haacht
September 21	UCI Road World Championships, Team time trial	UCI World Tour	(Note: The riders on the squad were Rohan Dennis, Silvan Dillier, Daniel Oss, Manuel Quinziato, Tejay van Garderen and Peter Velits)	Spain	Ponferrada
October 11	Tour of Beijing, Stage 2	UCI World Tour	Philippe Gilbert (BEL)	China	Yanqing
October 14	Tour of Beijing, Overall	UCI World Tour	Philippe Gilbert (BEL)	China	
