= 2014 Tour of Britain =

2014 UCI Europe Tour
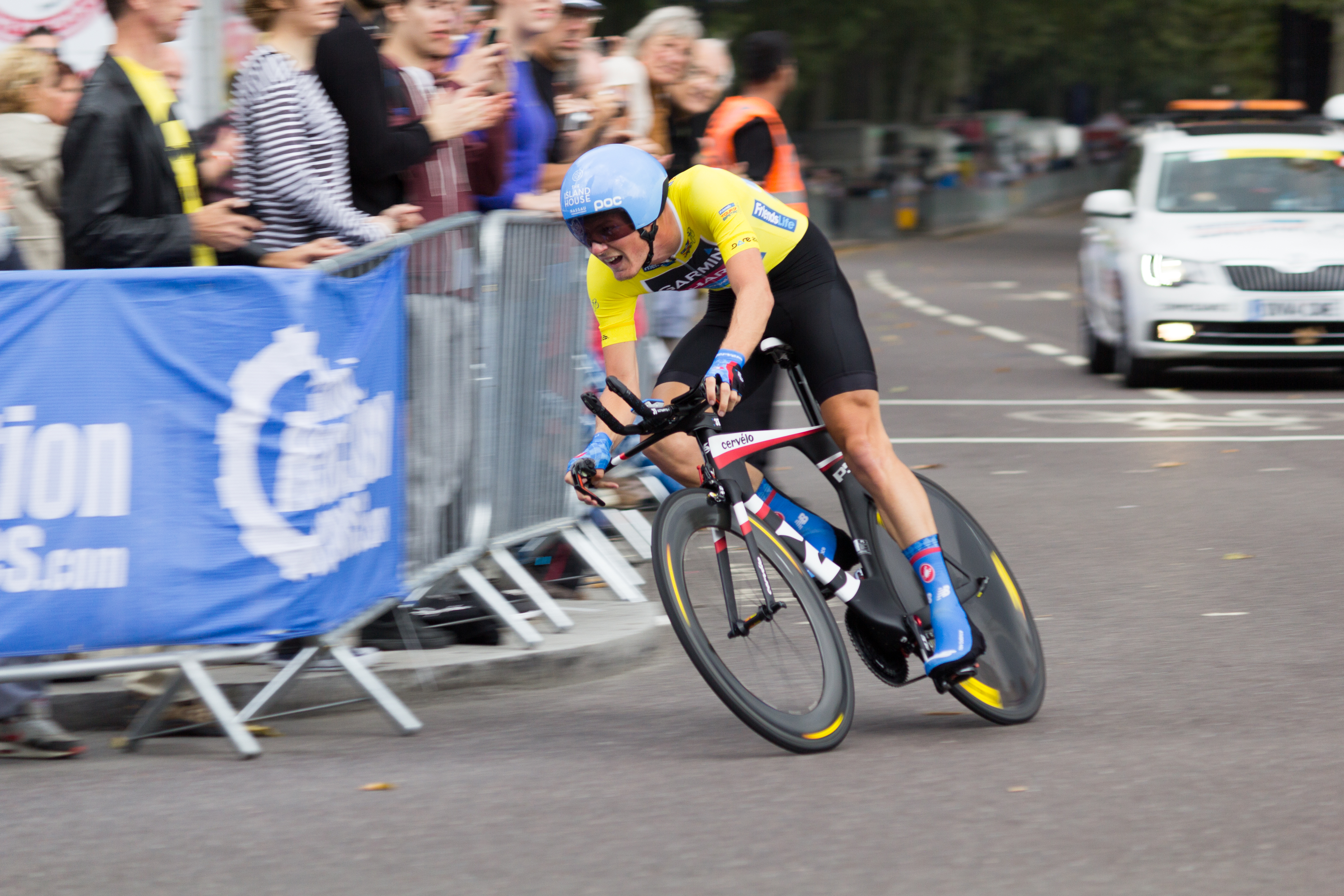
- Dylan Van Baarle during stage 8a

Race details
- Dates: 7–14 September 2014
- Stages: 8
- Distance: 1,375.7 km (854.8 mi)
- Winning time: 29h 45' 22"

Results
Jersey awarded to the overall winner	Winner	Dylan van Baarle (NED)	(Garmin–Sharp)
	Second	Michał Kwiatkowski (POL)	(Omega Pharma–Quick-Step)
	Third	Bradley Wiggins (GBR)	(Team Sky)
Jersey awarded to the points classification winner	Points	Michał Kwiatkowski (POL)	(Omega Pharma–Quick-Step)
Jersey awarded to the mountains classification winner	Mountains	Mark McNally (GBR)	(An Post–Chain Reaction)
Jersey awarded to the sprints classification winner	Sprints	Sebastian Lander (DEN)	(BMC Racing Team)
	Team	IAM Cycling	

The 2014 Friends Life Tour of Britain was an eight-stage men's professional road cycling race. It was the eleventh running of the 2004 incarnation of the Tour of Britain and the 75th British tour in total. The race started on 7 September in Liverpool, finishing on 14 September in London. The race was part of the 2014 UCI Europe Tour, and was categorised by the UCI as a 2.HC race, for the first time.

== Teams ==
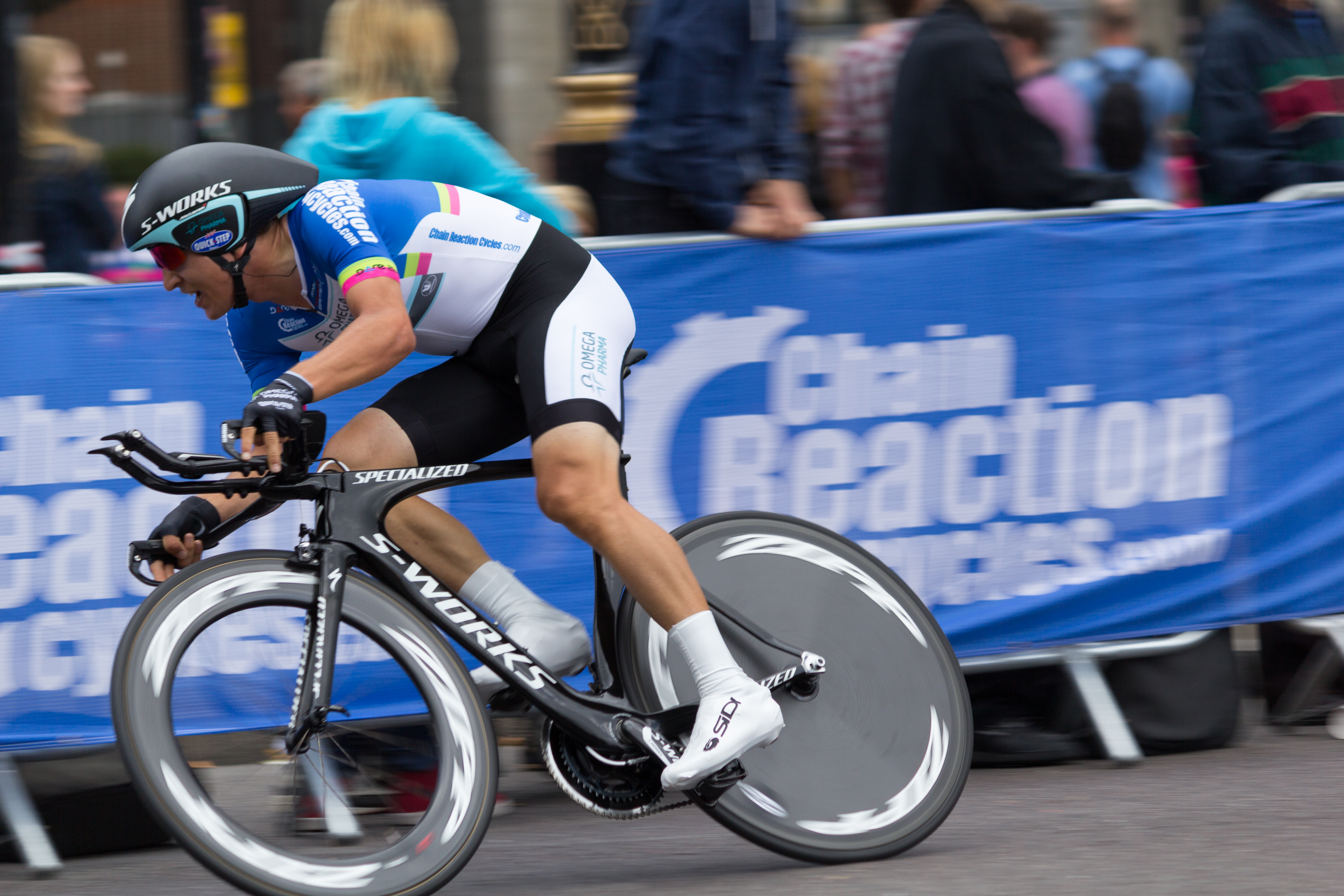
Michał Kwiatkowski, overall winner of the Points Classification

The twenty teams invited to participate in the Tour of Britain were:

UCI ProTeams
- Belkin Pro Cycling
- BMC Racing Team
- Garmin–Sharp
- Movistar Team
- Omega Pharma–Quick-Step
- Giant–Shimano
- Tinkoff–Saxo
- Team Sky
UCI Professional Continental Teams
- Bardiani–CSF
- IAM Cycling
- MTN–Qhubeka
- NetApp–Endura
- Team Novo Nordisk
UCI Continental Teams
- An Post–Chain Reaction
- Madison Genesis
- NFTO
- Velosure–Giordana
- Rapha Condor–JLT
- Team Raleigh
National Teams
- Great Britain

== Stages ==
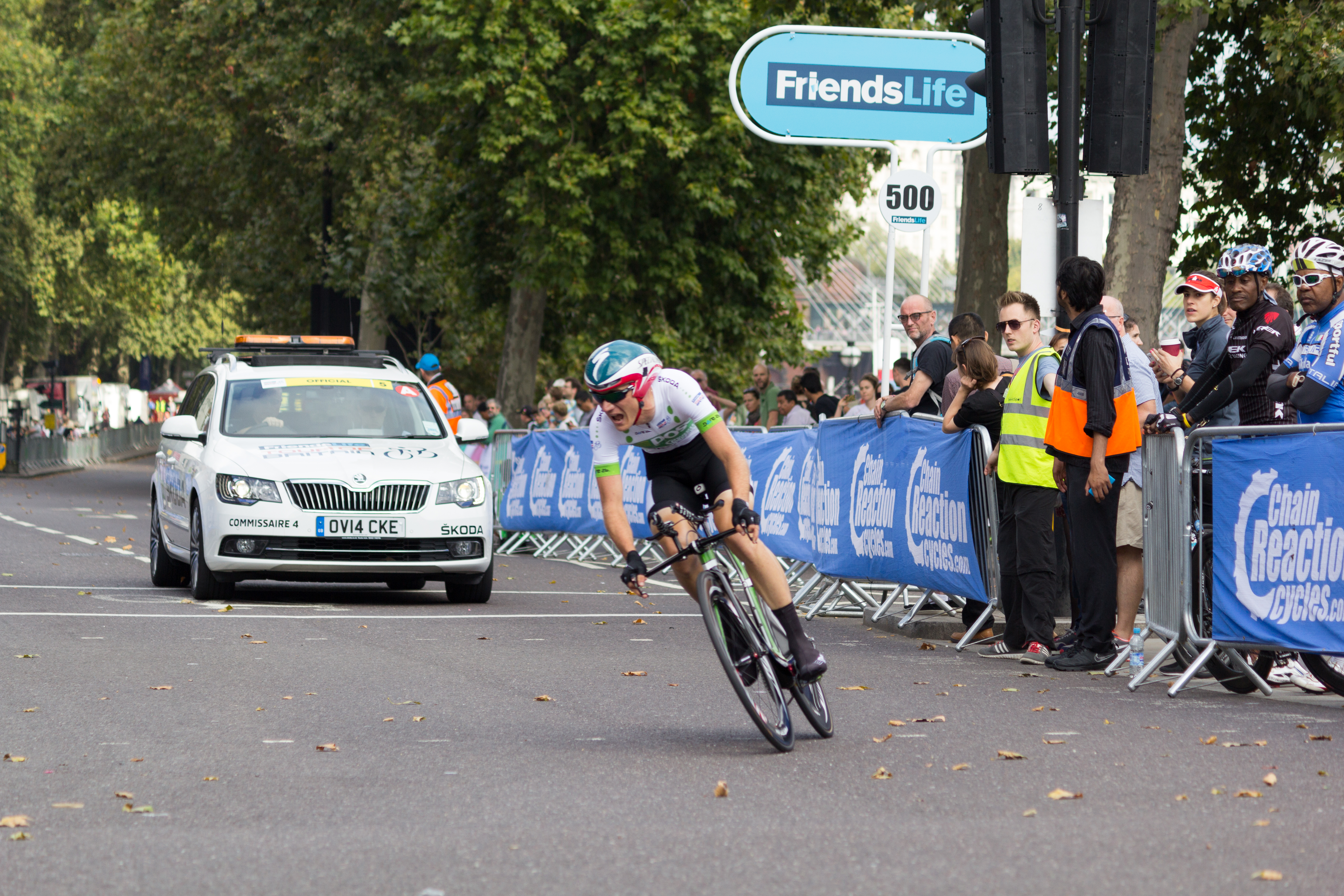
Mark McNally, King of the Mountains

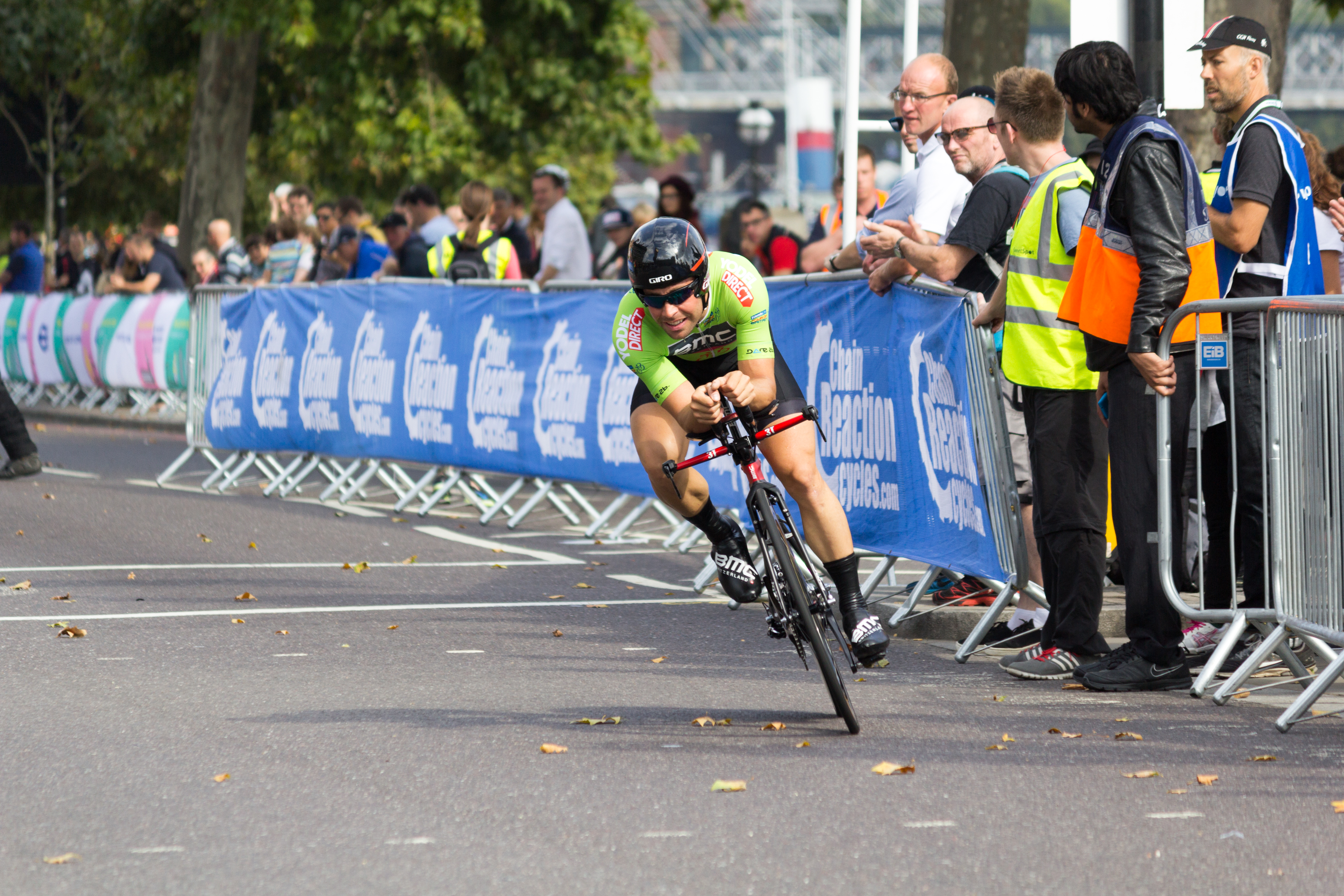
Sebastian Lander, overall winner of the Sprint Classification

There were 8 stages in the 2014 race. Notable stages were Stage 3, which featured a summit finish, and Stage 5, a hilly stage to Exeter.

List of stages
Stage	Date	Course	Distance	Type		Winner	Ref
1	7 September	Liverpool – Liverpool	104.8 km (65 mi)		Flat stage	Marcel Kittel (GER)	
2	8 September	Knowsley – Llandudno	200.8 km (125 mi)		Flat stage	Mark Renshaw (AUS)	
3	9 September	Newtown – The Tumble	179.9 km (112 mi)		Medium-mountain stage	Edoardo Zardini (ITA)	
4	10 September	Worcester – Bristol	184.6 km (115 mi)		Hilly stage	Michał Kwiatkowski (POL)	
5	11 September	Exmouth – Exeter	177.3 km (110 mi)		Hilly stage	Matthias Brändle (AUT)	
6	12 September	Bath – Hemel Hempstead	205.6 km (128 mi)		Flat stage	Matthias Brändle (AUT)	
7	13 September	Camberley – Brighton	225.1 km (140 mi)		Hilly stage	Julien Vermote (BEL)	
8a	14 September	London – London	8.8 km (5 mi)	Flat stage	Individual time trial	Bradley Wiggins (GBR)	
8b	14 September	London – London	88.8 km (55 mi)		Flat stage	Marcel Kittel (GER)	

=== Stage 1 ===
7 September 2014 — Liverpool to Liverpool, 104.8 kilometres (65.1 mi)

Stage 1 Result

	Rider	Team	Time
1	Marcel Kittel (GER)	Giant–Shimano	2h 16' 35"
2	Nicola Ruffoni (ITA)	Bardiani–CSF	+ 0"
3	Mark Cavendish (GBR)	Omega Pharma–Quick-Step	+ 0"
4	Tyler Farrar (USA)	Garmin–Sharp	+ 0"
5	Ben Swift (GBR)	Team Sky	+ 0"
6	Barry Markus (NED)	Belkin Pro Cycling	+ 0"
7	Daniel McLay (GBR)	Great Britain	+ 0"
8	Heinrich Haussler (AUS)	IAM Cycling	+ 0"
9	Nikolay Trusov (RUS)	Tinkoff–Saxo	+ 0"
10	Enrique Sanz (ESP)	Movistar Team	+ 0"

General Classification after Stage 1

	Rider	Team	Time
1	Marcel Kittel (GER)	Giant–Shimano	2h 16' 25"
2	Sonny Colbrelli (ITA)	Bardiani–CSF	+ 1"
3	Nicola Ruffoni (ITA)	Bardiani–CSF	+ 4"
4	Jon Mould (GBR)	NFTO	+ 4"
5	Mark Cavendish (GBR)	Omega Pharma–Quick-Step	+ 6"
6	Richard Handley (GBR)	Rapha Condor–JLT	+ 7"
7	Tyler Farrar (USA)	Garmin–Sharp	+ 10"
8	Ben Swift (GBR)	Team Sky	+ 10"
9	Barry Markus (NED)	Belkin Pro Cycling	+ 10"
10	Daniel McLay (GBR)	Great Britain	+ 10"

=== Stage 2 ===
8 September 2014 — Knowsley to Llandudno, 200.8 kilometres (124.8 mi)

Stage 2 Result

	Rider	Team	Time
1	Mark Renshaw (AUS)	Omega Pharma–Quick-Step	4h 38' 54"
2	Ben Swift (GBR)	Team Sky	+ 0"
3	Sam Bennett (IRL)	NetApp–Endura	+ 0"
4	Tyler Farrar (USA)	Garmin–Sharp	+ 0"
5	Rick Zabel (GER)	BMC Racing Team	+ 0"
6	Michał Kwiatkowski (POL)	Omega Pharma–Quick-Step	+ 0"
7	Jérôme Pineau (FRA)	IAM Cycling	+ 0"
8	Niki Terpstra (NED)	Omega Pharma–Quick-Step	+ 0"
9	Nicola Ruffoni (ITA)	Bardiani–CSF	+ 0"
10	Heinrich Haussler (AUS)	IAM Cycling	+ 0"

General Classification after Stage 2

	Rider	Team	Time
1	Mark Renshaw (AUS)	Omega Pharma–Quick-Step	6h 55' 19"
2	Ben Swift (GBR)	Team Sky	+ 4"
3	Nicola Ruffoni (ITA)	Bardiani–CSF	+ 4"
4	Sam Bennett (IRL)	NetApp–Endura	+ 6"
5	Mark Cavendish (GBR)	Omega Pharma–Quick-Step	+ 6"
6	Alex Dowsett (GBR)	Movistar Team	+ 7"
7	Richard Handley (GBR)	Rapha Condor–JLT	+ 7"
8	Tyler Farrar (USA)	Garmin–Sharp	+ 10"
9	Heinrich Haussler (AUS)	IAM Cycling	+ 10"
10	Rick Zabel (GER)	BMC Racing Team	+ 10"

=== Stage 3 ===
9 September 2014 — Newtown to The Tumble, 179.9 kilometres (111.8 mi)

Stage 3 Result

	Rider	Team	Time
1	Edoardo Zardini (ITA)	Bardiani–CSF	4h 35' 02"
2	Michał Kwiatkowski (POL)	Omega Pharma–Quick-Step	+ 9"
3	Nicolas Roche (IRL)	Tinkoff–Saxo	+ 11"
4	Dylan Teuns (BEL)	BMC Racing Team	+ 11"
5	Bradley Wiggins (GBR)	Team Sky	+ 14"
6	Giovanni Visconti (ITA)	Movistar Team	+ 14"
7	David López (ESP)	Team Sky	+ 14"
8	Sébastien Reichenbach (SUI)	IAM Cycling	+ 16"
9	Ion Izagirre (ESP)	Movistar Team	+ 16"
10	Leopold König (CZE)	NetApp–Endura	+ 16"

General Classification after Stage 3

	Rider	Team	Time
1	Edoardo Zardini (ITA)	Bardiani–CSF	11h 30' 21"
2	Michał Kwiatkowski (POL)	Omega Pharma–Quick-Step	+ 13"
3	Nicolas Roche (IRL)	Tinkoff–Saxo	+ 17"
4	Dylan Teuns (BEL)	BMC Racing Team	+ 21"
5	Bradley Wiggins (GBR)	Team Sky	+ 24"
6	David López (ESP)	Team Sky	+ 24"
7	Ion Izagirre (ESP)	Movistar Team	+ 26"
8	Leopold König (CZE)	NetApp–Endura	+ 26"
9	Sébastien Reichenbach (SUI)	IAM Cycling	+ 26"
10	Giovanni Visconti (ITA)	Movistar Team	+ 37"

=== Stage 4 ===
10 September 2014 — Worcester to Bristol, 184.6 kilometres (114.7 mi)

Stage 4 Result

	Rider	Team	Time
1	Michał Kwiatkowski (POL)	Omega Pharma–Quick-Step	4h 19' 09"
2	Albert Timmer (NED)	Giant–Shimano	+ 0"
3	Dylan Teuns (BEL)	BMC Racing Team	+ 0"
4	Jack Bauer (NZL)	Garmin–Sharp	+ 0"
5	Ion Izagirre (ESP)	Movistar Team	+ 0"
6	Nicolas Roche (IRL)	Tinkoff–Saxo	+ 0"
7	Ben Swift (GBR)	Team Sky	+ 6"
8	Rick Zabel (GER)	BMC Racing Team	+ 6"
9	Sonny Colbrelli (ITA)	Bardiani–CSF	+ 6"
10	Sylvain Chavanel (FRA)	IAM Cycling	+ 6"

General Classification after Stage 4

	Rider	Team	Time
1	Michał Kwiatkowski (POL)	Omega Pharma–Quick-Step	15h 49' 33"
2	Edoardo Zardini (ITA)	Bardiani–CSF	+ 3"
3	Dylan Teuns (BEL)	BMC Racing Team	+ 14"
4	Nicolas Roche (IRL)	Tinkoff–Saxo	+ 14"
5	Ion Izagirre (ESP)	Movistar Team	+ 23"
6	Bradley Wiggins (GBR)	Team Sky	+ 27"
7	David López (ESP)	Team Sky	+ 27"
8	Leopold König (CZE)	NetApp–Endura	+ 29"
9	Sébastien Reichenbach (SUI)	IAM Cycling	+ 29"
10	Giovanni Visconti (ITA)	Movistar Team	+ 40"

=== Stage 5 ===
11 September 2014 — Exmouth to Exeter, 177.3 kilometres (110.2 mi)

Stage 5 Result

	Rider	Team	Time
1	Matthias Brändle (AUT)	IAM Cycling	4h 32' 03"
2	Shane Archbold (NZL)	An Post–Chain Reaction	+ 8"
3	Maarten Wynants (BEL)	Belkin Pro Cycling	+ 8"
4	Sonny Colbrelli (ITA)	Bardiani–CSF	+ 14"
5	Ben Swift (GBR)	Team Sky	+ 14"
6	Rick Zabel (GER)	BMC Racing Team	+ 14"
7	Michał Kwiatkowski (POL)	Omega Pharma–Quick-Step	+ 14"
8	Kevyn Ista (BEL)	IAM Cycling	+ 14"
9	Nicolas Roche (IRL)	Tinkoff–Saxo	+ 14"
10	Jack Bauer (NZL)	Garmin–Sharp	+ 14"

General Classification after Stage 5

	Rider	Team	Time
1	Michał Kwiatkowski (POL)	Omega Pharma–Quick-Step	20h 21' 50"
2	Edoardo Zardini (ITA)	Bardiani–CSF	+ 3"
3	Dylan Teuns (BEL)	BMC Racing Team	+ 14"
4	Nicolas Roche (IRL)	Tinkoff–Saxo	+ 14"
5	Ion Izagirre (ESP)	Movistar Team	+ 23"
6	Bradley Wiggins (GBR)	Team Sky	+ 27"
7	David López (ESP)	Team Sky	+ 27"
8	Leopold König (CZE)	NetApp–Endura	+ 29"
9	Sébastien Reichenbach (SUI)	IAM Cycling	+ 29"
10	Giovanni Visconti (ITA)	Movistar Team	+ 40"

=== Stage 6 ===
12 September 2014 — Bath to Hemel Hempstead, 205.6 kilometres (127.8 mi)

Stage 6 Result

	Rider	Team	Time
1	Matthias Brändle (AUT)	IAM Cycling	4h 44' 49"
2	Alex Dowsett (GBR)	Movistar Team	+ 1"
3	Tom Stewart (GBR)	Madison Genesis	+ 1"
4	Sonny Colbrelli (ITA)	Bardiani–CSF	+ 1' 51"
5	Nicola Ruffoni (ITA)	Bardiani–CSF	+ 1' 51"
6	Ben Swift (GBR)	Team Sky	+ 1' 51"
7	Martin Kohler (SUI)	BMC Racing Team	+ 1' 51"
8	Heinrich Haussler (AUS)	IAM Cycling	+ 1' 51"
9	Rick Zabel (GER)	BMC Racing Team	+ 1' 51"
10	Tom Veelers (NED)	Giant–Shimano	+ 1' 51"

General Classification after Stage 6

	Rider	Team	Time
1	Alex Dowsett (GBR)	Movistar Team	25h 07' 53"
2	Michał Kwiatkowski (POL)	Omega Pharma–Quick-Step	+ 34"
3	Edoardo Zardini (ITA)	Bardiani–CSF	+ 40"
4	Nicolas Roche (IRL)	Tinkoff–Saxo	+ 50"
5	Dylan Teuns (BEL)	BMC Racing Team	+ 51"
6	Ion Izagirre (ESP)	Movistar Team	+ 1' 00"
7	Bradley Wiggins (GBR)	Team Sky	+ 1' 02"
8	David López (ESP)	Team Sky	+ 1' 04"
9	Leopold König (CZE)	NetApp–Endura	+ 1' 06"
10	Sébastien Reichenbach (SUI)	IAM Cycling	+ 1' 06"

=== Stage 7 ===
13 September 2014 — Camberley to Brighton, 225.1 kilometres (139.9 mi)

Stage 7 Result

	Rider	Team	Time
1	Julien Vermote (BEL)	Omega Pharma–Quick-Step	5h 12' 34"
2	Ignatas Konovalovas (LTU)	MTN–Qhubeka	+ 23"
3	Dylan van Baarle (NED)	Garmin–Sharp	+ 23"
4	Michał Kwiatkowski (POL)	Omega Pharma–Quick-Step	+ 1' 20"
5	Lars Petter Nordhaug (NOR)	Belkin Pro Cycling	+ 1' 20"
6	Kevyn Ista (BEL)	IAM Cycling	+ 1' 20"
7	Dylan Teuns (BEL)	BMC Racing Team	+ 1' 20"
8	Sylvain Chavanel (FRA)	IAM Cycling	+ 1' 20"
9	Francesco Manuel Bongiorno (ITA)	Bardiani–CSF	+ 1' 20"
10	Edoardo Zardini (ITA)	Bardiani–CSF	+ 1' 20"

General Classification after Stage 7

	Rider	Team	Time
1	Dylan van Baarle (NED)	Garmin–Sharp	30h 22' 02"
2	Michał Kwiatkowski (POL)	Omega Pharma–Quick-Step	+ 19"
3	Edoardo Zardini (ITA)	Bardiani–CSF	+ 25"
4	Nicolas Roche (IRL)	Tinkoff–Saxo	+ 35"
5	Dylan Teuns (BEL)	BMC Racing Team	+ 36"
6	Ion Izagirre (ESP)	Movistar Team	+ 45"
7	Bradley Wiggins (GBR)	Team Sky	+ 47"
8	David López (ESP)	Team Sky	+ 49"
9	Sébastien Reichenbach (SUI)	IAM Cycling	+ 51"
10	Alex Dowsett (GBR)	Movistar Team	+ 59"

=== Stage 8a ===
14 September 2014 — London to London, 8.8 kilometres (5.5 mi)

Stage 8a Result

	Rider	Team	Time
1	Bradley Wiggins (GBR)	Team Sky	9' 50"
2	Sylvain Chavanel (FRA)	IAM Cycling	+ 8"
3	Steve Cummings (GBR)	BMC Racing Team	+ 9"
4	Jan Bárta (CZE)	NetApp–Endura	+ 14"
5	Matthias Brändle (AUT)	IAM Cycling	+ 15"
6	Michał Kwiatkowski (POL)	Omega Pharma–Quick-Step	+ 16"
7	Ryan Mullen (IRL)	An Post–Chain Reaction	+ 20"
8	Alex Dowsett (GBR)	Movistar Team	+ 20"
9	Christopher Juul-Jensen (DEN)	Tinkoff–Saxo	+ 24"
10	Martin Kohler (SUI)	BMC Racing Team	+ 25"

General Classification after Stage 8a

	Rider	Team	Time
1	Dylan van Baarle (NED)	Garmin–Sharp	30h 32' 17"
2	Michał Kwiatkowski (POL)	Omega Pharma–Quick-Step	+ 10"
3	Bradley Wiggins (GBR)	Team Sky	+ 22"
4	Edoardo Zardini (ITA)	Bardiani–CSF	+ 37"
5	Nicolas Roche (IRL)	Tinkoff–Saxo	+ 42"
6	Ion Izagirre (ESP)	Movistar Team	+ 46"
7	Sylvain Chavanel (FRA)	IAM Cycling	+ 50"
8	Alex Dowsett (GBR)	Movistar Team	+ 54"
9	Dylan Teuns (BEL)	BMC Racing Team	+ 1' 10"
10	David López (ESP)	Team Sky	+ 1' 11"

=== Stage 8b ===
14 September 2014 — London to London, 88.8 kilometres (55.2 mi)

Stage 8b Result

	Rider	Team	Time
1	Marcel Kittel (GER)	Giant–Shimano	1h 50' 33"
2	Mark Cavendish (GBR)	Omega Pharma–Quick-Step	+ 0"
3	Nicola Ruffoni (ITA)	Bardiani–CSF	+ 0"
4	Enrique Sanz (ESP)	Movistar Team	+ 0"
5	Rick Zabel (GER)	BMC Racing Team	+ 0"
6	Ian Wilkinson (GBR)	Team Raleigh	+ 0"
7	Daniel McLay (GBR)	Great Britain	+ 0"
8	Nikolay Trusov (RUS)	Tinkoff–Saxo	+ 0"
9	Adam Blythe (GBR)	NFTO	+ 0"
10	Shane Archbold (NZL)	An Post–Chain Reaction	+ 0"

Final General Classification

	Rider	Team	Time
1	Dylan van Baarle (NED)	Garmin–Sharp	32h 22' 50"
2	Michał Kwiatkowski (POL)	Omega Pharma–Quick-Step	+ 10"
3	Bradley Wiggins (GBR)	Team Sky	+ 22"
4	Edoardo Zardini (ITA)	Bardiani–CSF	+ 37"
5	Nicolas Roche (IRL)	Tinkoff–Saxo	+ 42"
6	Ion Izagirre (ESP)	Movistar Team	+ 46"
7	Sylvain Chavanel (FRA)	IAM Cycling	+ 50"
8	Alex Dowsett (GBR)	Movistar Team	+ 54"
9	Jan Bárta (CZE)	NetApp–Endura	+ 1' 09"
10	Dylan Teuns (BEL)	BMC Racing Team	+ 1' 10"

== Classification leadership ==
Stage	Winner	General classification	Sprint Classification	Mountains Classification	Points Classification	Team Classification
1	Marcel Kittel	Marcel Kittel	Sonny Colbrelli	Mark McNally	Marcel Kittel	Belkin Pro Cycling
2	Mark Renshaw	Mark Renshaw	Sonny Colbrelli	Mark McNally	Ben Swift	Omega Pharma–Quick-Step
3	Edoardo Zardini	Edoardo Zardini	Sonny Colbrelli	Mark McNally	Ben Swift	IAM Cycling
4	Michał Kwiatkowski	Michał Kwiatkowski	Sebastian Lander	Mark McNally	Michał Kwiatkowski	Tinkoff–Saxo
5	Matthias Brändle	Michał Kwiatkowski	Sebastian Lander	Mark McNally	Michał Kwiatkowski	IAM Cycling
6	Matthias Brändle	Alex Dowsett	Sebastian Lander	Mark McNally	Ben Swift	IAM Cycling
7	Julien Vermote	Dylan van Baarle	Sebastian Lander	Mark McNally	Michał Kwiatkowski	IAM Cycling
8a	Bradley Wiggins	Dylan van Baarle	Sebastian Lander	Mark McNally	Michał Kwiatkowski	IAM Cycling
8b	Marcel Kittel	Dylan van Baarle	Sebastian Lander	Mark McNally	Michał Kwiatkowski	IAM Cycling
Final		Dylan van Baarle	Sebastian Lander	Mark McNally	Michał Kwiatkowski	IAM Cycling

== Standings ==
Legend
Yellow jersey	Denotes the leader of the General classification	Blue jersey	Denotes the leader of the Points classification
White jersey	Denotes the leader of the Mountains classification	Green jersey	Denotes the leader of the Sprints classification

=== General classification ===
	Rider	Team	Time
1	Dylan van Baarle (NED)	Garmin–Sharp	32h 22' 50"
2	Michał Kwiatkowski (POL)	Omega Pharma–Quick-Step	+ 10"
3	Bradley Wiggins (GBR)	Team Sky	+ 22"
4	Edoardo Zardini (ITA)	Bardiani–CSF	+ 37"
5	Nicolas Roche (IRL)	Tinkoff–Saxo	+ 42"
6	Ion Izagirre (ESP)	Movistar Team	+ 46"
7	Sylvain Chavanel (FRA)	IAM Cycling	+ 50"
8	Alex Dowsett (GBR)	Movistar Team	+ 54"
9	Jan Bárta (CZE)	NetApp–Endura	+ 1' 09"
10	Dylan Teuns (BEL)	BMC Racing Team	+ 1' 10"

=== Points classification ===
	Rider	Team	Points
1	Michał Kwiatkowski (POL)	Omega Pharma–Quick-Step	70
2	Ben Swift (GBR)	Team Sky	55
3	Rick Zabel (GER)	BMC Racing Team	49
4	Nicola Ruffoni (ITA)	Bardiani–CSF	45
5	Matthias Brändle (AUT)	IAM Cycling	41
6	Sylvain Chavanel (FRA)	IAM Cycling	41
7	Dylan Teuns (BEL)	BMC Racing Team	34
8	Bradley Wiggins (GBR)	Team Sky	33
9	Marcel Kittel (GER)	Giant–Shimano	30
10	Nicolas Roche (IRL)	Tinkoff–Saxo	30

=== Mountains classification ===
	Rider	Team	Points
1	Mark McNally (GBR)	An Post–Chain Reaction	51
2	Matthias Brändle (AUT)	IAM Cycling	30
3	Michał Kwiatkowski (POL)	Omega Pharma–Quick-Step	25
4	Dylan van Baarle (NED)	Garmin–Sharp	24
5	Julien Vermote (BEL)	Omega Pharma–Quick-Step	23
6	Ignatas Konovalovas (LTU)	MTN–Qhubeka	22
7	Tom Stewart (GBR)	Madison Genesis	20
8	Alex Dowsett (GBR)	Movistar Team	19
9	Shane Archbold (NZL)	An Post–Chain Reaction	19
10	Marcin Białobłocki (POL)	Velosure–Giordana	16

=== Sprints classification ===
	Rider	Team	Time
1	Sebastian Lander (DEN)	BMC Racing Team	16
2	Alex Dowsett (GBR)	Movistar Team	14
3	Dylan van Baarle (NED)	Garmin–Sharp	9
4	Matthias Brändle (AUT)	IAM Cycling	9
5	Lasse Norman Hansen (DEN)	Garmin–Sharp	7
6	Manuele Boaro (ITA)	Tinkoff–Saxo	7
7	Maarten Wynants (BEL)	Belkin Pro Cycling	6
8	Andreas Stauff (GER)	MTN–Qhubeka	4
9	Ian Bibby (GBR)	Madison Genesis	4
10	Julien Vermote (BEL)	Omega Pharma–Quick-Step	4

=== Team classification ===
	Team	Time
1	IAM Cycling	97h 09' 47"
2	Tinkoff–Saxo	+ 2' 27"
3	Movistar Team	+ 3' 25"
4	Team Sky	+ 3' 31"
5	Omega Pharma–Quick-Step	+ 5' 48"
6	Bardiani–CSF	+ 7' 58"
7	Garmin–Sharp	+ 8' 11"
8	MTN–Qhubeka	+ 9' 05"
9	NetApp–Endura	+ 20' 12"
10	Belkin Pro Cycling	+ 21' 03"
