= 2015 Giro del Trentino =

2015 UCI Europe Tour

Race details
- Dates: 21–24 April 2015
- Stages: 4
- Distance: 519.4 km (322.7 mi)
- Winning time: 13h 43' 41"

Results
Jersey awarded to the overall winner	Winner	Richie Porte (AUS)	(Team Sky)
	Second	Mikel Landa (ESP)	(Astana)
	Third	Leopold König (CZE)	(Team Sky)
Jersey awarded to the mountains classification winner	Mountains	Rodolfo Torres (COL)	(Colombia)
Jersey awarded to the young rider classification winner	Young rider	Louis Meintjes (RSA)	(MTN–Qhubeka)
Jersey awarded to the sprints classification winner	Sprints	Cesare Benedetti (ITA)	(Bora–Argon 18)
	Team	Astana	

The 2015 Giro del Trentino was the 39th edition of the Giro del Trentino cycling stage race. The official name of the race was Giro del Trentino-Melinda, as the former one-day race Trofeo Melinda merged with the Giro del Trentino due to financial issues. For this reason, the last stage of Giro del Trentino passed through Val di Sole and the Non Valley, on the traditional route of the Trofeo Melinda. The race started on 21 April in Riva del Garda and ended on 24 April in Cles. The race consisted of four stages; as in recent years, the first was a team time trial from Riva del Garda to Arco. The race was part of the 2015 UCI Europe Tour, and was rated as a 2.HC event.

The race was won by Team Sky's Australian rider Richie Porte, who took the leader's jersey after winning the second stage. Spaniard Mikel Landa of Astana was second and Porte's teammate Leopold König was third. Colombian Rodolfo Torres of Colombia claimed the Mountains classification, Cesare Benedetti (Bora–Argon 18) won the sprints classification, and MTN–Qhubeka's Louis Meintjes, from South Africa, finished first in the young rider classification just as he did in 2014. Astana won the teams classification.

== Schedule ==
Stage	Date	Route	Distance	Type	Winner
1	21 April	Riva del Garda to Arco	13.3 km (8.3 mi)	Team time trial	Bora–Argon 18
2	22 April	Dro to Brentonico (Parco del Baldo)	165.6 km (102.9 mi)	Mountain stage	Richie Porte (AUS)
3	23 April	Ala to Fierozzo Val dei Mòcheni	179 km (111.2 mi)	Mountain stage	Domenico Pozzovivo (ITA)
4	24 April	Malé to Cles	161.5 km (100.4 mi)	Intermediate stage	Paolo Tiralongo (ITA)
Total		519.4 km (322.7 mi)			

== Teams ==
16 teams were selected to take part in the 2015 Giro del Trentino. Four of these were UCI WorldTeams, ten were UCI Professional Continental teams, with the remaining two teams being UCI Continental team Tirol Cycling Team and an Italian national team.

UCI WorldTeams

- AG2R La Mondiale
- Astana
- Cannondale–Garmin
- Team Sky

UCI Professional Continental teams

- Bardiani–CSF
- Nippo–Vini Fantini
- Caja Rural–Seguros RGA
- MTN–Qhubeka
- Southeast Pro Cycling
- Colombia
- RusVelo
- Bora–Argon 18
- Cult Energy Pro Cycling
- Androni Giocattoli

Continental teams

- Tirol Cycling Team

National teams

- Italy

== Stages ==
=== Stage 1 ===
21 April 2015 — Riva del Garda to Arco, 13.3 km (8.3 mi), team time trial (TTT)

Stage 1 result
Rank	Team	Time
1	Bora–Argon 18	14' 05"
2	Team Sky	+ 0"
3	Astana	+ 4"
4	AG2R La Mondiale	+ 7"
5	Caja Rural–Seguros RGA	+ 19"
6	Southeast Pro Cycling	+ 22"
7	MTN–Qhubeka	+ 24"
8	Cannondale–Garmin	+ 24"
9	Nippo–Vini Fantini	+ 31"
10	Bardiani–CSF	+ 36"

General classification after stage 1
Rank	Rider	Team	Time
1	Cesare Benedetti (ITA)	Bora–Argon 18	14' 05"
2	Patrick Konrad (AUT)	Bora–Argon 18	+ 0"
3	Emanuel Buchmann (GER)	Bora–Argon 18	+ 0"
4	José Mendes (POR)	Bora–Argon 18	+ 0"
5	Dominik Nerz (GER)	Bora–Argon 18	+ 0"
6	Richie Porte (AUS)	Team Sky	+ 0"
7	Sebastián Henao (COL)	Team Sky	+ 0"
8	Leopold König (CZE)	Team Sky	+ 0"
9	David López (ESP)	Team Sky	+ 0"
10	Ian Boswell (USA)	Team Sky	+ 0"

=== Stage 2 ===
22 April 2015 — Dro to Brentonico (Parco del Baldo), 165.6 km (102.9 mi)

Stage 2 result
Rank	Rider	Team	Time
1	Richie Porte (AUS)	Team Sky	4h 36' 37"
2	Mikel Landa (ESP)	Astana	+ 16"
3	Damiano Cunego (ITA)	Nippo–Vini Fantini	+ 32"
4	Leopold König (CZE)	Team Sky	+ 32"
5	Rodolfo Torres (COL)	Colombia	+ 32"
6	Edoardo Zardini (ITA)	Bardiani–CSF	+ 32"
7	Dario Cataldo (ITA)	Astana	+ 43"
8	Stefano Pirazzi (ITA)	Bardiani–CSF	+ 43"
9	Louis Meintjes (RSA)	MTN–Qhubeka	+ 43"
10	José Mendes (POR)	Bora–Argon 18	+ 49"

General classification after stage 2
Rank	Rider	Team	Time
1	Richie Porte (AUS)	Team Sky	4h 50' 32"
2	Mikel Landa (ESP)	Astana	+ 24"
3	Leopold König (CZE)	Team Sky	+ 42"
4	Dario Cataldo (ITA)	Astana	+ 57"
5	José Mendes (POR)	Bora–Argon 18	+ 59"
6	Damiano Cunego (ITA)	Nippo–Vini Fantini	+ 1' 09"
7	Louis Meintjes (RSA)	MTN–Qhubeka	+ 1' 17"
8	Edoardo Zardini (ITA)	Bardiani–CSF	+ 1' 18"
9	David López (ESP)	Team Sky	+ 1' 23"
10	Stefano Pirazzi (ITA)	Bardiani–CSF	+ 1' 29"

=== Stage 3 ===
23 April 2015 — Ala to Fierozzo Val dei Mòcheni, 179 km (111.2 mi)

Stage 3 result
Rank	Rider	Team	Time
1	Domenico Pozzovivo (ITA)	AG2R La Mondiale	4h 54' 12"
2	Mikel Landa (ESP)	Astana	+ 5"
3	Richie Porte (AUS)	Team Sky	+ 5"
4	Romain Bardet (FRA)	AG2R La Mondiale	+ 5"
5	Damiano Cunego (ITA)	Nippo–Vini Fantini	+ 5"
6	Rodolfo Torres (COL)	Colombia	+ 13"
7	Dario Cataldo (ITA)	Astana	+ 15"
8	Diego Rosa (ITA)	Astana	+ 15"
9	Louis Meintjes (RSA)	MTN–Qhubeka	+ 17"
10	Leopold König (CZE)	Team Sky	+ 17"

General classification after stage 3
Rank	Rider	Team	Time
1	Richie Porte (AUS)	Team Sky	9h 44' 45"
2	Mikel Landa (ESP)	Astana	+ 22"
3	Leopold König (CZE)	Team Sky	+ 58"
4	Dario Cataldo (ITA)	Astana	+ 1' 11"
5	Damiano Cunego (ITA)	Nippo–Vini Fantini	+ 1' 13"
6	José Mendes (POR)	Bora–Argon 18	+ 1' 15"
7	Domenico Pozzovivo (ITA)	AG2R La Mondiale	+ 1' 32"
8	Louis Meintjes (RSA)	MTN–Qhubeka	+ 1' 33"
9	Romain Bardet (FRA)	AG2R La Mondiale	+ 1' 34"
10	Edoardo Zardini (ITA)	Bardiani–CSF	+ 1' 37"

=== Stage 4 ===
24 April 2015 — Malé to Cles, 161.5 km (100.4 mi)

Stage 4 result
Rank	Rider	Team	Time
1	Paolo Tiralongo (ITA)	Astana	3h 58' 07"
2	David Arroyo (ESP)	Caja Rural–Seguros RGA	+ 0"
3	Fabio Duarte (COL)	Colombia	+ 0"
4	Alessandro Bisolti (ITA)	Nippo–Vini Fantini	+ 37"
5	Jean-Christophe Péraud (FRA)	AG2R La Mondiale	+ 37"
6	Gianfranco Zilioli (ITA)	Androni Giocattoli	+ 37"
7	Simone Petilli (ITA)	Italy (national team)	+ 39"
8	Amets Txurruka (ESP)	Caja Rural–Seguros RGA	+ 49"
9	Stefano Pirazzi (ITA)	Bardiani–CSF	+ 49"
10	José Mendes (POR)	Bora–Argon 18	+ 49"

Final general classification
Rank	Rider	Team	Time
1	Richie Porte (AUS)	Team Sky	13h 43' 41"
2	Mikel Landa (ESP)	Astana	+ 22"
3	Leopold König (CZE)	Team Sky	+ 58"
4	Dario Cataldo (ITA)	Astana	+ 1' 11"
5	Damiano Cunego (ITA)	Nippo–Vini Fantini	+ 1' 13"
6	José Mendes (POR)	Bora–Argon 18	+ 1' 15"
7	Domenico Pozzovivo (ITA)	AG2R La Mondiale	+ 1' 32"
8	Louis Meintjes (RSA)	MTN–Qhubeka	+ 1' 33"
9	Romain Bardet (FRA)	AG2R La Mondiale	+ 1' 34"
10	Edoardo Zardini (ITA)	Bardiani–CSF	+ 1' 37"

== Classification leadership table ==
Stage	Winner	General classification	Mountains classification	Young rider classification	Intermediate sprints classification	Teams classification
1	Bora–Argon 18	Cesare Benedetti	not awarded	Emanuel Buchmann	not awarded	Bora–Argon 18
2	Richie Porte	Richie Porte	Rodolfo Torres	Louis Meintjes	Lasse Norman Hansen	Team Sky
3	Domenico Pozzovivo	Richie Porte	Rodolfo Torres	Louis Meintjes	Lukas Pöstlberger	Astana
4	Paolo Tiralongo	Richie Porte	Rodolfo Torres	Louis Meintjes	Cesare Benedetti	Astana
Final		Richie Porte	Rodolfo Torres	Louis Meintjes	Cesare Benedetti	Astana

== Final standings ==
=== General classification ===
Rank	Rider	Team	Time
1	Richie Porte (AUS)	Team Sky	13h 43' 41"
2	Mikel Landa (ESP)	Astana	+ 22"
3	Leopold König (CZE)	Team Sky	+ 58"
4	Dario Cataldo (ITA)	Astana	+ 1' 11"
5	Damiano Cunego (ITA)	Nippo–Vini Fantini	+ 1' 13"
6	José Mendes (POR)	Bora–Argon 18	+ 1' 15"
7	Domenico Pozzovivo (ITA)	AG2R La Mondiale	+ 1' 32"
8	Louis Meintjes (RSA)	MTN–Qhubeka	+ 1' 33"
9	Romain Bardet (FRA)	AG2R La Mondiale	+ 1' 34"
10	Edoardo Zardini (ITA)	Bardiani–CSF	+ 1' 37"

=== Mountains classification ===
Rank	Rider	Team	Points
1	Rodolfo Torres (COL)	Colombia	20
2	Lukas Pöstlberger (AUT)	Tirol Cycling Team	12
3	Richie Porte (AUS)	Team Sky	12
4	Domenico Pozzovivo (ITA)	AG2R La Mondiale	12
5	Kanstantsin Sivtsov (BLR)	Team Sky	10
6	Mikel Landa (ESP)	Astana	8
7	Fabio Duarte (COL)	Colombia	6
8	Simone Petilli (ITA)	Italy (national team)	6
9	Diego Rosa (ITA)	Astana	6
10	Hubert Dupont (FRA)	AG2R La Mondiale	6

=== Sprints classification ===
Rank	Rider	Team	Points
1	Cesare Benedetti (ITA)	Bora–Argon 18	8
2	Lukas Pöstlberger (AUT)	Tirol Cycling Team	8
3	Paul Voß (GER)	Bora–Argon 18	6
4	David Wöhrer (AUT)	Tirol Cycling Team	4
5	Simone Sterbini (ITA)	Bardiani–CSF	2

=== Young rider classification ===
Rank	Rider	Team	Time
1	Louis Meintjes (RSA)	MTN–Qhubeka	13h 43' 14"
2	Merhawi Kudus (ERI)	MTN–Qhubeka	+ 5' 38"
3	Emanuel Buchmann (GER)	Bora–Argon 18	+ 5' 57"
4	Hugh Carthy (GBR)	Caja Rural–Seguros RGA	+ 7' 35"
5	Davide Gabburo (ITA)	Italy (national team)	+ 9' 56"
6	Luca Chirico (ITA)	Bardiani–CSF	+ 10' 49"
7	Sebastián Henao (COL)	Team Sky	+ 22' 10"
8	Lukas Pöstlberger (AUT)	Tirol Cycling Team	+ 23' 22"
9	Giacomo Berlato (ITA)	Nippo–Vini Fantini	+ 23' 41"
10	Markus Freiberger (AUT)	Tirol Cycling Team	+ 25' 51"
