= Mikel Landa =

Spanish road cyclist

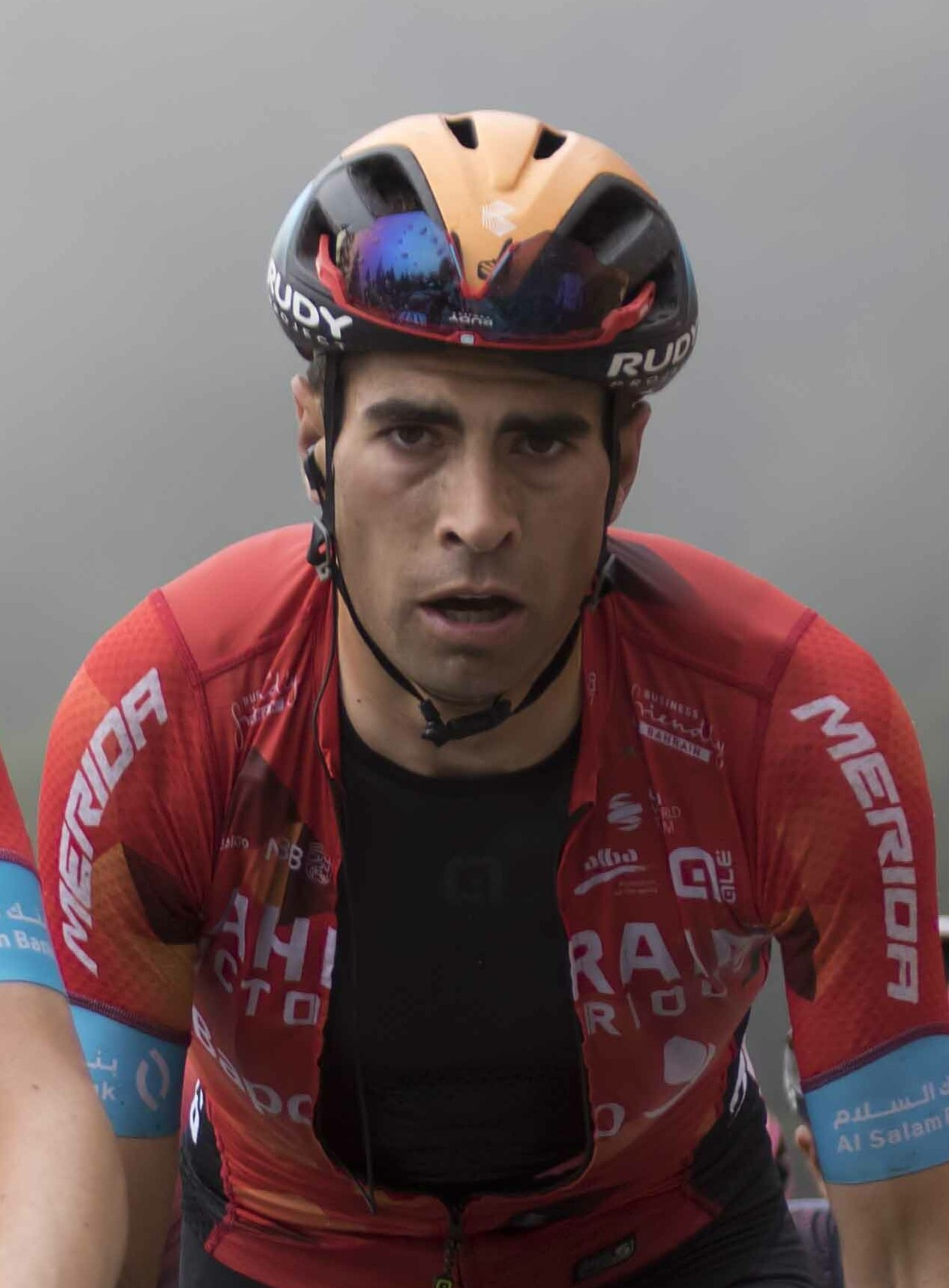
- Landa at the 2022 Giro d'Italia

Personal information
- Full name: Mikel Alfredo Landa Meana
- Born: 13 December 1989 (age 36) Murgia, Spain
- Height: 1.73 m (5 ft 8 in)
- Weight: 60 kg (132 lb; 9 st 6 lb)

Cycling career
- Sport: Cycling
- Current team: Soudal–Quick-Step
- Discipline: Road
- Role: Rider
- Rider type: Climber

Professional teams
- 2009–2010: Orbea
- 2011–2013: Euskaltel–Euskadi
- 2014–2015: Astana
- 2016–2017: Team Sky
- 2018–2019: Movistar Team
- 2020–2023: Bahrain–McLaren
- 2024–: Soudal–Quick-Step

Major wins
- Grand Tours Giro d'Italia Mountains classification (2017) 3 individual stages (2015, 2017) Vuelta a España 2 individual stages (2015, 2026) Stage races Giro del Trentino (2016) Vuelta a Burgos (2017, 2021)

Mikel Landa Meana (born 13 December 1989) is a Spanish Basque professional road cyclist who rides for UCI WorldTeam Soudal–Quick-Step. His career breakthrough came at the 2015 Giro d'Italia where he won two stages and finished third overall.

== Career ==
=== Early career ===
Landa was born in Murgia (Álava), in the Basque Country in northern Spain. Like many Basque cyclists he began his career at the Orbea development team, in 2009, before graduating to the Euskaltel–Euskadi professional team in 2011. After three years with the Euskaltel–Euskadi squad, Landa left the team at the end of the 2013 season – due to its disestablishment – to join Astana. In 2018, as president of the Euskadi Cycling Foundation, a new UCI Continental squad Fundación Euskadi was established, with expectations of returning to the top races.

=== Astana (2014–2015) ===
Landa won a stage of the 2014 Giro del Trentino before riding the Giro d'Italia as one of Fabio Aru's mountain domestiques. He helped Aru to finish third overall.

==== 2015 season ====
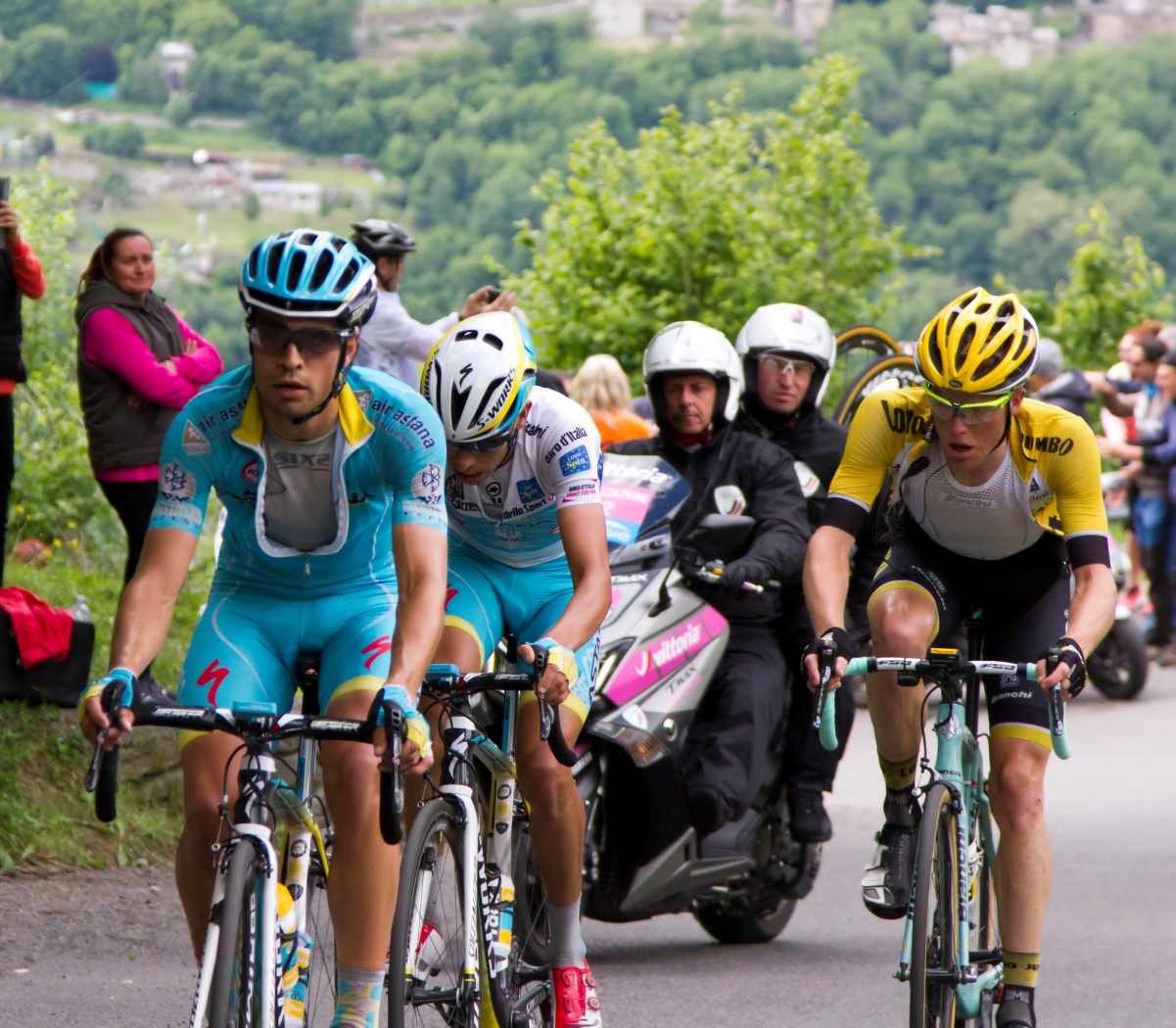
Landa (left) with Fabio Aru and Steven Kruijswijk at the 2015 Giro d'Italia

In 2015, Landa attacked from a breakaway on the final climb of the day to win the fifth stage of his home race, the Tour of the Basque Country. Landa rode the Giro d'Italia, again initially as a domestique for Aru. On Stage 8, the second mountain top finish of the race to Campitello Matese, Landa finished second after following an attack by Aru, and then unsuccessfully chasing after leader Beñat Intxausti (Movistar Team) in an attempt to win the stage. By doing so Landa rose to fifth place overall, 42 seconds down on leader Alberto Contador (Tinkoff–Saxo). Landa rose to third overall on Stage 10, when Richie Porte (Team Sky) was given a time penalty for accepting a wheel change from Orica–GreenEDGE rider Simon Clarke. On Stage 14, a 59.4-kilometre (36.9-mile) individual time trial, Landa was caught on the road by Contador, losing over three minutes to him, and dropped to seventh overall, 4 minutes 55 seconds back. However, the next day, Landa won the mountainous Stage 15 after attacking Contador on the final climb to Madonna di Campiglio, and proving stronger than Aru, who he finished six seconds ahead of.

Stage 16 was the queen stage of the race with five Italian Alpine peaks, including the Tonale Pass, the Mortirolo Pass and a mountain finish to Aprica. On the first of two climbs to Aprica, Contador suffered a mechanical problem, after which Team Katusha and Astana immediately pressed on the pace at the front, sparking a bit of controversy over respect and fair play. After a long chase Contador eventually caught up with Landa, Aru and Steven Kruijswijk (LottoNL–Jumbo) on the Mortirolo after being 52 seconds down at the start of the climb. Contador then counter-attacked, with Landa proving stronger than Aru, who was unable to follow the move. Landa rode away on the final ascent to Aprica, winning his second stage in a row by 38 seconds over Kruijswijk and Contador. Aru finished 2 minutes and 51 seconds behind, and thus Landa moved ahead of his teammate to second overall. However, on Stage 19 it was Aru who proved the stronger of the two, attacking on the final climb to Breuil-Cervinia and taking 1 minute and 18 seconds on Contador and Landa, who did not respond to his move. On Stage 20, the last mountain stage, Landa attacked on the Colle delle Finestre, taking the Cima Coppi for crossing the highest point of the race in the lead as he crossed the summit with Ilnur Zakarin (Team Katusha), a minute ahead of Aru and a minute and a half ahead of Contador. However, Landa waited for Aru on the descent, and the pair were unable to take sufficient time from Contador on the remainder of the stage, before Aru attacked on the final climb to Sestriere to win the stage. Although Contador lost two and a half minutes, he kept the maglia rosa with a lead of 2' 02" over Aru to win the Giro, with Landa finishing third overall 3 minutes 14 seconds back.

Landa rode the Vuelta a España again in support of Aru, after Astana's other leader Vincenzo Nibali was disqualified on the second stage for holding onto a team car. Landa won the mountainous stage 11 from Andorra la Vella to Cortals d'Encamp from the breakaway, ignoring team orders to drop back and assist Aru. However, Landa did work for Aru during the rest of the race as Aru traded the race lead with Tom Dumoulin (Team Giant–Alpecin), and played a key role in the decisive move on stage 20 when he and Aru dropped Dumoulin on the penultimate climb before being joined by teammates from the breakaway to ride away from Dumoulin, who lost over three minutes and thus the Vuelta to Aru.

=== Team Sky (2016–2017) ===
In September 2015 Landa confirmed that he would join Team Sky for the 2016 season.

==== 2016 season ====
After missing several early season races through illness, Landa made his first appearance for Team Sky at the Settimana Internazionale di Coppi e Bartali, finishing 11th overall. Landa then rode his home race, the Tour of the Basque Country, where he won the second stage to take the race lead. Landa led Team Sky at the Giro del Trentino in his last warm up race before the Giro d'Italia. He won Stage 2 to take the race lead, and successfully defended it on the following two stages despite attacks from Astana duo Tanel Kangert and Jakob Fuglsang to take overall victory by a single second over Kangert. Landa abandoned the Giro d'Italia part-way through Stage 10 after being hampered by illness overnight and being diagnosed with viral gastroenteritis. This came just a day after he had impressed in the Stage 9 individual time trial, after which he was sitting in 8th place overall. Landa was named in the start list for the Tour de France. He helped Chris Froome win the race for a third time by acting as a mountain domestique.

==== 2017 season ====
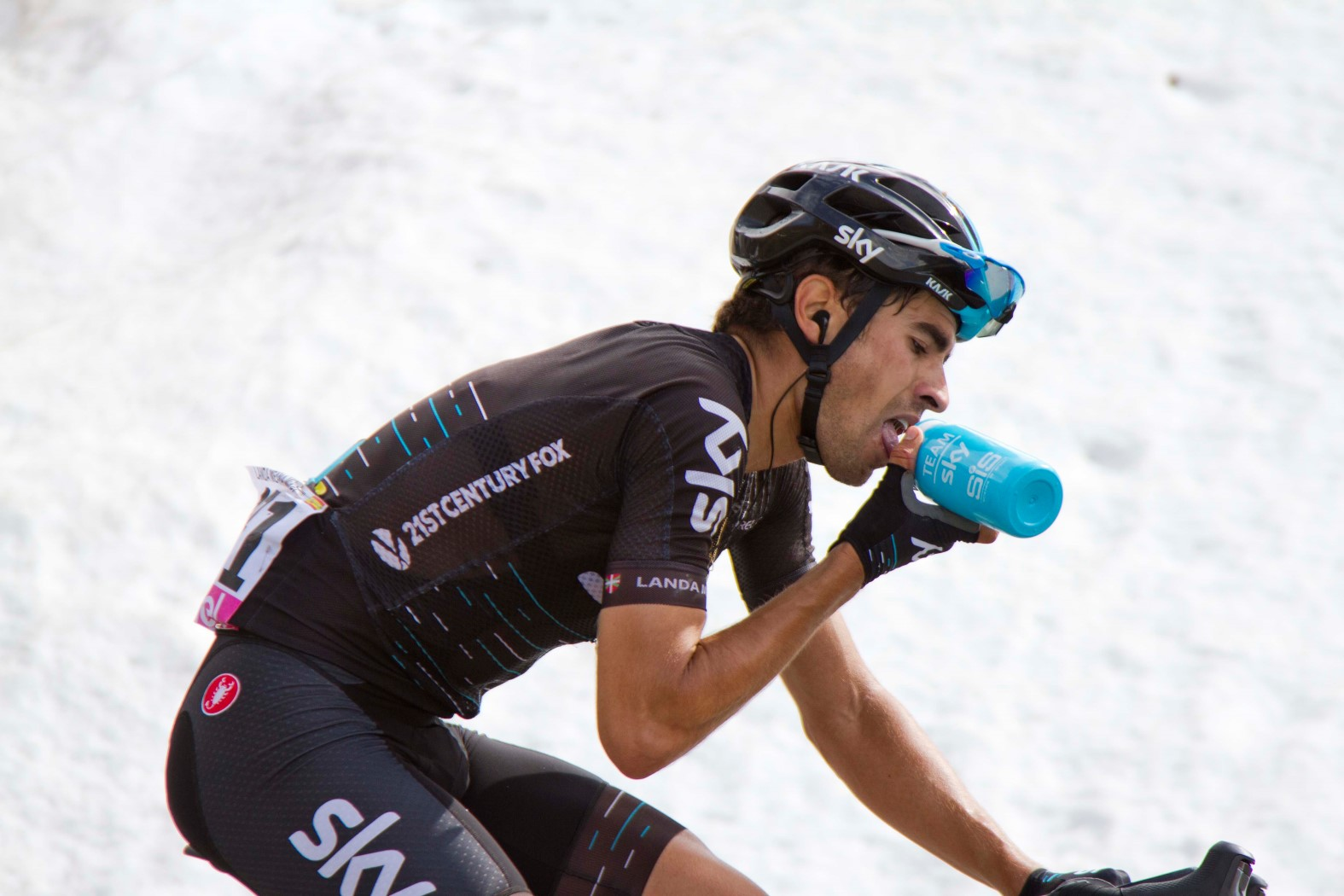
Landa at the 2017 Giro d'Italia

In January 2017 it was announced that Landa would share leadership with Geraint Thomas at the Giro d'Italia. However, on stage 9, as the peloton approached the final climb of the day to Blockhaus, Wilco Kelderman of Team Sunweb collided with a stationary police motorcycle, that caused him to swerve to his right into the Sky riders, which resulted in Landa and the majority of his team mates being brought down. Landa was able to remount and continue, but he finished almost 27 minutes down on the stage winner, Nairo Quintana. With his hopes of a high overall finish in the race over, Landa rode aggressively in several breakaways in the mountains. He finished third on Stage 14 and won his second Cima Coppi on Stage 16, beating Igor Antón (Team Dimension Data) to the summit of the Stelvio Pass. Later in the stage he was in the breakaway group at the front of the race and with about 25 kilometres (16 miles) to go in the stage he dropped his breakaway companions Jan Hirt and Steven Kruijswijk. He was caught by Vincenzo Nibali on the descent from the final climb and the two remained clear to the finish in Bormio; Nibali out-sprinted Landa for the stage victory, but Landa took the lead of the mountains classification. Landa finished second again on stage 18, losing by a bike length to Tejay van Garderen, but won the following stage to the ski resort of Piancavallo, securing an unassailable lead in the mountains classification.

Landa was named in the start list for the Tour de France, initially as a mountain domestique for Chris Froome. On Stage 12 which finished with a short steep climb to Peyragudes, Landa finished fourth, five seconds behind stage winner Romain Bardet whilst Froome came seventh, 22 seconds down on Bardet. On Stage 13, Landa was part of a four man breakaway with Warren Barguil, Quintana and Alberto Contador. Barguil won the stage, with the quartet finishing 1:39 ahead of the other overall contenders. On Stage 15, Froome suffered a broken spoke on the Peyra Taillade climb, but with some assistance from Landa and other teammates, he was able to chase back up to the group before the summit. Landa ultimately placed fourth behind Froome, Rigoberto Urán and Bardet, finishing just 1 second behind Bardet in third.

On 29 July, one week after the end of the Tour de France, Landa placed fifth in a five-rider group sprint in the Clásica de San Sebastián, which was won by teammate Michał Kwiatkowski. The following week, Landa took overall victory at the Vuelta a Burgos, as well as winning two stages and the points and mountains classifications.

=== Movistar Team (2018–2019) ===
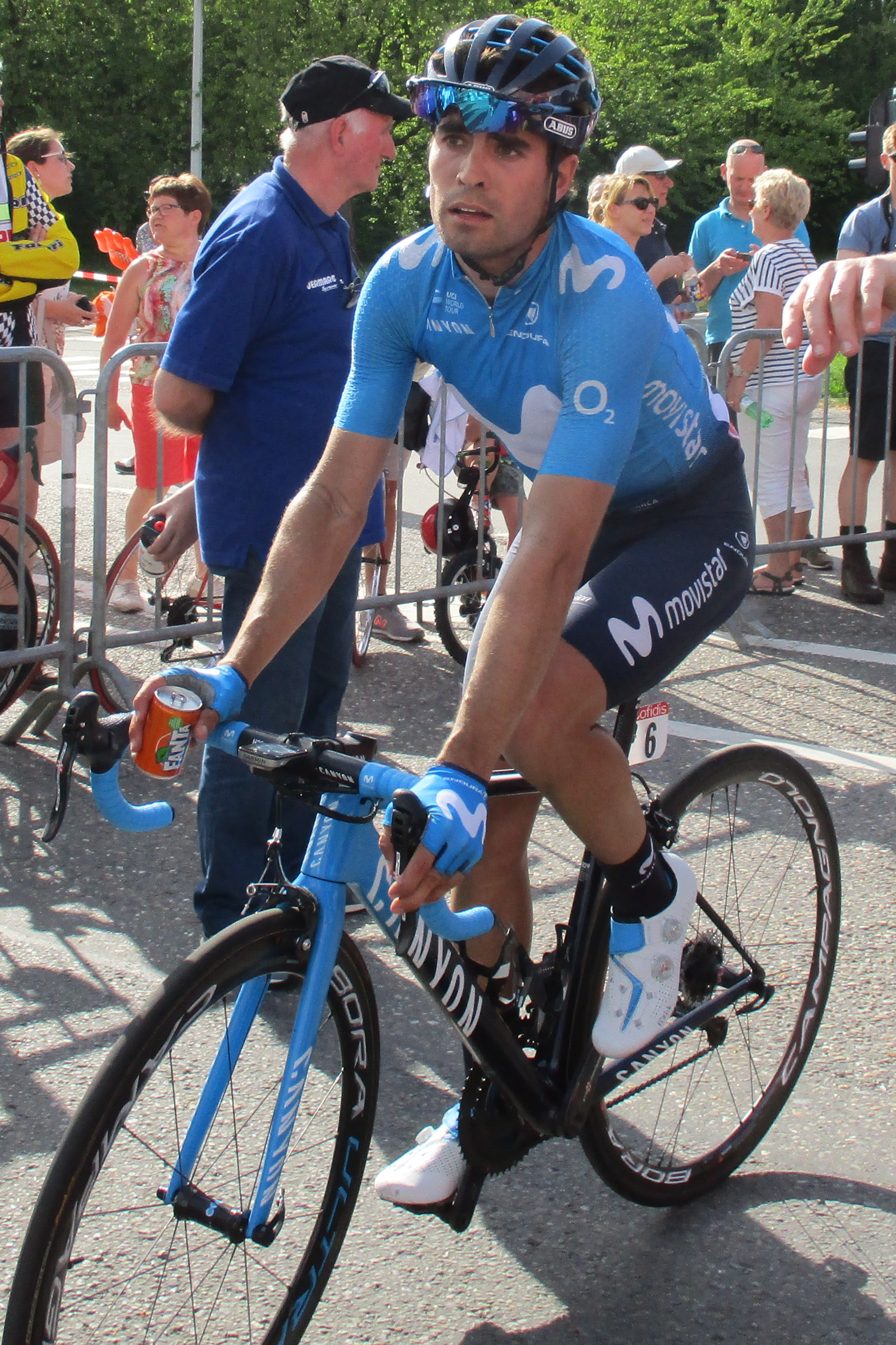
Landa at the 2018 Liège–Bastogne–Liège

On 15 August 2017, it was announced that Landa had signed with Movistar Team for a two-year contract, commencing in 2018. Landa took his first victory of 2018 on Stage 4 of Tirreno–Adriatico, after attacking on the mountain top finish at Sarnano Sassotetto.

During the 2019 season he earned top 10 finishes in Liège–Bastogne–Liège and the Tour of the Basque Country, while also finishing fourth overall at the Giro d'Italia – losing a podium placing by eight seconds to Primož Roglič, following the final stage individual time trial – and sixth overall at the Tour de France.

=== Bahrain–McLaren (2020–2023) ===
In August 2019, Landa confirmed that he had signed with the Bahrain–Merida team, later renamed as Bahrain–McLaren, for the 2020 season.

In his opening race of the 2020 season, Landa finished third overall at February's Vuelta a Andalucía, prior to the COVID-19 pandemic-enforced stoppage of racing. After finishing second overall at the Vuelta a Burgos, Landa was Bahrain–McLaren's team leader at the Tour de France. Having entered the top ten overall following stage 9, Landa moved up the general classification in the final week of the race. Attacking late on mountain stages and being assisted in the mountains by Damiano Caruso he eventually finished fourth-place finish.

Landa started his 2021 season – with the renamed Team Bahrain Victorious – with a trio of Italian races, including Tirreno–Adriatico, where he finished third overall. He again finished in the top ten overall at the Tour of the Basque Country, ahead of the Giro d'Italia. On stage 5, Landa was involved in a crash within the final 5 kilometres (3.1 miles). Another rider hit a race marshall at a traffic island and caused the incident which forced him to abandon the race after being diagnosed with fractures to his left clavicle and multiple ribs.

He started off 2022 showing good form, taking the final podium spot in Tirreno–Adriatico.

He entered the 2022 Giro d'Italia with intentions of a high place in the general classification. Midway through the second week he had the requisite first week luck and was in a top 10 position within +0:30 of the lead, fighting with Carapaz, Almeida, Hindley and Nibali for the win. On stage 17 Landa launched the final attack of the stage among the GC riders. Almeida and Nibali were both dropped by over a minute as Landa lost a few seconds to Hindley and Carapaz at the end of the stage. On stage 20 the race was decided on the final high mountain, the Passo Fedaia. Landa was able to gain about thirty seconds over Carapaz but Hindley dropped them both and essentially won the Giro. Going into the final ITT Landa's place on the podium was secured as the 4th place rider, Nibali, was more than +5:00 behind him.

=== Soudal QuickStep ===
In August 2023, Landa signed with Soudal–QuickStep beginning in 2024. Soudal signed him to boost Remco Evenepoel’s bid in the Tour de France. Landa rode in the 2024 Tour de France, where he finished fifth overall.

Landa rode in the 2025 Giro d’Italia, but a bad crash led to a broken vertebrae, causing him to abandon the race and spend months recovering.

== Major results ==
2010
5th Overall Tour de l'Avenir
10th Overall Ronde de l'Isard
2011 (1 pro win)
Vuelta a Burgos

1st Mountains classification
1st Stage 5

2012
2nd GP Miguel Induráin
7th Overall Vuelta a la Comunidad de Madrid
7th Vuelta a La Rioja
2013
2nd Overall Vuelta a Asturias

1st Points classification

2nd Vuelta a la Comunidad de Madrid
6th Overall Vuelta a Burgos
6th Clásica de San Sebastián
2014 (1)
10th Overall Giro del Trentino

1st Stage 4

2015 (4)
Vuelta a España

1st Stage 11
Combativity award Stage 11

1st Stage 5 Tour of the Basque Country
1st Stage 2 (TTT) Vuelta a Burgos
2nd Overall Giro del Trentino
3rd Overall Giro d'Italia

1st Azzurri d'Italia classification
1st Stages 15 & 16

2016 (3)
1st Overall Giro del Trentino

1st Mountains classification
1st Stage 2

1st Stage 2 Tour of the Basque Country
2017 (4)
1st Overall Vuelta a Burgos

1st Points classification
1st Mountains classification
1st Stages 1 & 3

Giro d'Italia

1st Mountains classification
1st Stage 19

2nd Time trial, National Road Championships
4th Overall Tour de France
5th Overall Tour of the Alps
5th Clásica de San Sebastián
6th Overall Vuelta a Andalucía
2018 (1)
2nd Overall Tour of the Basque Country
6th Overall Tirreno–Adriatico

1st Stage 4

6th Overall Vuelta a Andalucía
7th Overall Tour de France

Combativity award Stage 19

2019 (1)
4th Overall Settimana Internazionale di Coppi e Bartali

1st Stage 2

4th Overall Giro d'Italia
6th Overall Tour de France

Combativity award Stage 15

7th Overall Tour of the Basque Country
7th Liège–Bastogne–Liège
2020
2nd Overall Vuelta a Burgos

1st Points classification

3rd Overall Vuelta a Andalucía
4th Overall Tour de France
2021 (1)
1st Overall Vuelta a Burgos
3rd Overall Tirreno–Adriatico
3rd GP Industria & Artigianato di Larciano
6th Trofeo Laigueglia
8th Overall Tour of the Basque Country
2022
3rd Overall Giro d'Italia
3rd Overall Tirreno–Adriatico
3rd Giro di Lombardia
Combativity award Stage 8 Vuelta a España
2023
2nd Overall Tour of the Basque Country
2nd Overall Vuelta a Andalucía
3rd La Flèche Wallonne
5th Overall Vuelta a España

Combativity award Stage 6

5th Overall Volta a Catalunya
7th Overall Tirreno–Adriatico
7th Overall Volta a la Comunitat Valenciana
2024
2nd Overall Volta a Catalunya
5th Road race, National Road Championships
5th Overall Tour de France
8th Overall Vuelta a España
10th Overall Critérium du Dauphiné
2025
4th Overall Volta a Catalunya
7th Overall Tirreno–Adriatico
Vuelta a España

Combativity award Stages 16 & 20

2026 (1)
1st Stage 20 Vuelta a España

=== General classification results timeline ===
Grand Tour general classification results
Grand Tour	2012	2013	2014	2015	2016	2017	2018	2019	2020	2021	2022	2023	2024	2025	2026
Giro d'Italia	—	—	34	3	DNF	17	—	4	—	DNF	3	—	—	DNF	—
Tour de France	—	—	—	—	35	4	7	6	4	—	—	19	5	—	—
Vuelta a España	69	39	28	25	—	—	—	—	—	DNF	15	5	8	27	30
Major stage race general classification results
Stage race	2012	2013	2014	2015	2016	2017	2018	2019	2020	2021	2022	2023	2024	2025	2026
Paris–Nice	Has not contested during his career														
Tirreno–Adriatico	80	—	—	—	—	31	6	—	—	3	3	7	—	7	—
Volta a Catalunya	—	33	36	47	—	DNF	—	—	NH	—	—	5	2	4	15
Tour of the Basque Country	—	DNF	14	22	12	—	2	7	NH	8	—	2	DNF	—	DNF
Tour de Romandie	35	78	—	—	—	—	—	—	NH	—	—	—	—	—	—
Critérium du Dauphiné	83	—	—	—	12	—	—	—	18	—	—	22	10	—	—
Tour de Suisse	—	—	—	—	—	—	16	—	NH	—	—	—	—	—	DNF

Legend
—	Did not compete
DNF	Did not finish
NH	Not held
IP	In progress
