= Louis Meintjes =

South African cyclist (born 1992)

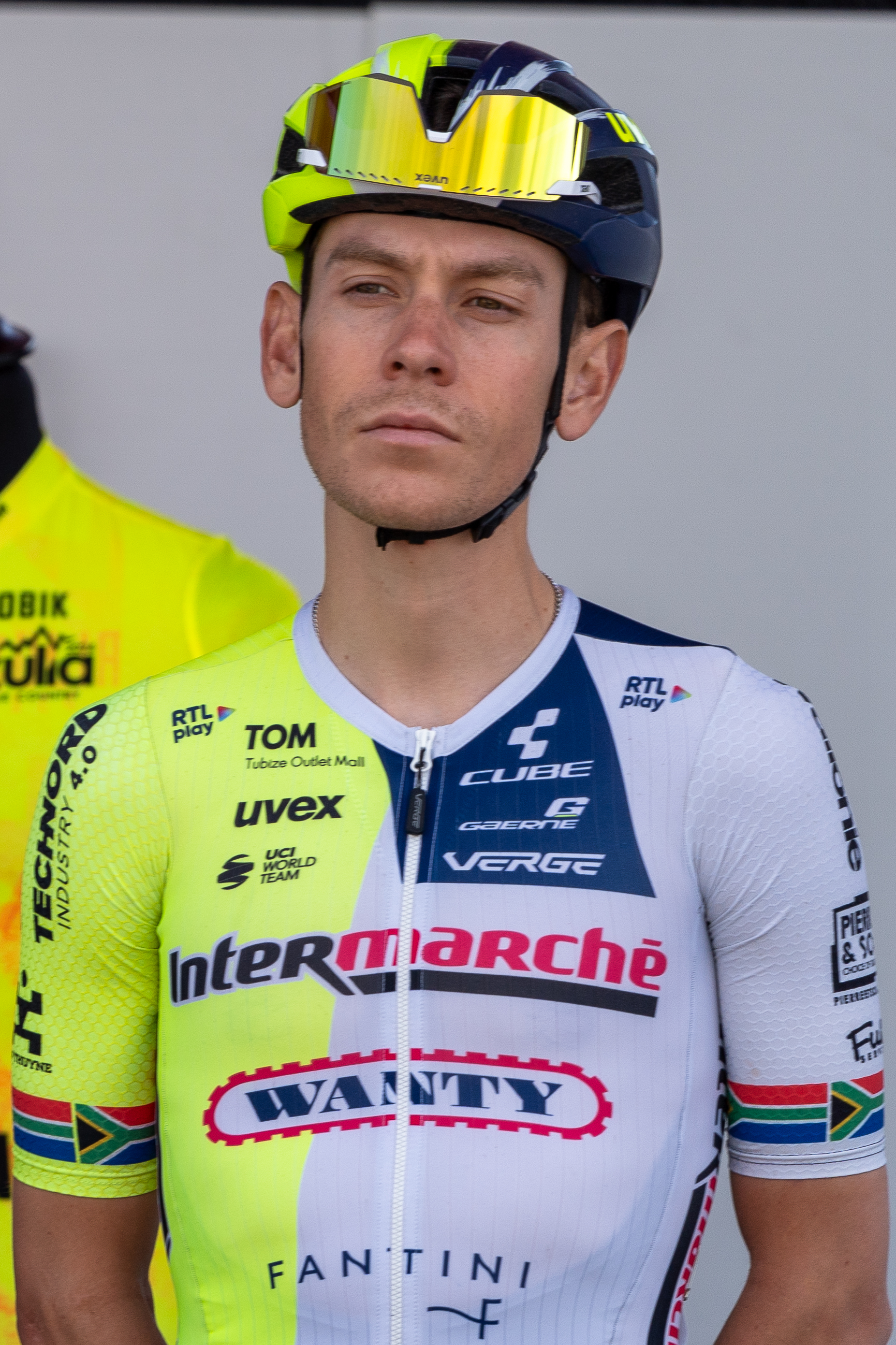
- Meintjes in Espelette, 2024 Itzulia.

Personal information
- Born: 21 February 1992 (age 34) Pretoria, South Africa
- Height: 173 cm (5 ft 8 in)
- Weight: 59 kg (130 lb)

Cycling career
- Sport: Cycling
- Discipline: Road
- Role: Rider (retired)
- Rider type: Climber

Amateur teams
- 2011: UC Seraing Crabbé Performance
- 2012: Lotto–Belisol U23

Professional teams
- 2013–2015: MTN–Qhubeka
- 2016–2017: Lampre–Merida
- 2018–2020: Team Dimension Data
- 2021–2025: Intermarché–Wanty–Gobert Matériaux

Major wins
- Grand Tours Vuelta a España 1 individual stage (2022) One-day races and Classics National Road Race Championships (2014)
Medal record
Representing South Africa
Men's road bicycle racing
UCI Road World Championships
Silver medal – second place	2013 Tuscany	Under-23 road race

Louis Meintjes (born 21 February 1992) is a retired South African cyclist, who last rode for UCI WorldTeam Intermarché–Wanty. He won the South African National Road Race Championships in 2014, and has finished 8th overall in the Tour de France, on 3 occasions in 2016, 2017 and 2022. He has also finished 10th overall at the 2015 Vuelta a España, and won a stage at the 2022 Vuelta a España.

He is widely known for his unorthodox climbing style, as he often took the last place of the peloton, overtaking riders as they dropped on the climb, often remaining with the leaders' group until late in the stages. This has earned him the nickname "El Revisor" (The Ticket Inspector) amongst Spanish commentators, as he conducts his "roll call" in the hardest climbs.

== Career ==
=== MTN–Qhubeka (2013–2015) ===
Meintjes announced himself to the cycling world in September 2013, when he earned the silver medal in the under-23 road race at the UCI Road World Championships. Meintjes had an impressive 2014 season where he rode his first grand tour, the Vuelta a España. His best result at the Vuelta a España was 5th place on stage 14.

In March 2015, Meintjes won the final stage of the Settimana Internazionale di Coppi e Bartali, securing him the overall victory as well. He was named in the start list for the Tour de France. He finished fifth on the mountain stage to Plateau de Beille before exiting the Tour due to illness. He was 10th in the Vuelta a España.

=== Lampre–Merida (2016–2017) ===
==== 2016 ====
In September 2015, Meintjes announced that he would be joining Lampre–Merida on a two-year contract from 2016. He started the 2016 season riding the Tour Down Under and finished 16th overall, and 5th in the young rider classification. Meintjes however, first showed his form in the Critérium du Dauphiné by finishing 9th overall and placing 5th on the stage to Méribel. Then he rode the Tour de France where he took 8th place overall and 2nd place in the young rider classification. He was sitting in 9th place overall after the 10th stage, but lost time in the following stage in the crosswinds. He recovered during the mountain time trial on stage 18, regaining his 9th place. On the following stage to Saint-Gervais Mont Blanc, Meintjes finished fourth sprinting with Joaquim Rodríguez and Alejandro Valverde. He finished with the favourites on the next stage, achieving 8th place in Paris. Meintjes' next race was the road race at the Rio Olympics. He was dropped before the last climb but he bridged the gap before sprinting to 7th place at Copacabana Beach.

==== 2017 ====
Meintjes finished 6th overall at the Tour of the Basque Country, and two months later he finished 8th overall at the Critérium du Dauphiné. At the Tour de France, Meintjes was once again team leader for UAE Team Emirates, and slowly made his way into top 10 in the second week, as he finished 5th on stage 12 to Peyragudes. He moved up further two positions in the final week, and finished 8th overall for the second time in his career at the Tour. His last race of the season was the Vuelta a España where he finished 12th overall.

=== Team Dimension Data (2018–2020) ===
Meintjes returned to his former team, Team Dimension Data, for the 2018 season. He was named in the startlist for the 2018 Giro d'Italia. However he struggled with his form throughout the spring, and was not consistent at all, and abandoned the race in the third week. His best result of the season came at his final preparation race for the Vuelta a España, the Vuelta a Burgos, where he finished 9th overall. Meintjes struggled once again at the Vuelta a España, and he would go on to finish 58th overall.

=== Intermarché–Wanty–Gobert Matériaux ===
In November 2020, Meintjes signed a one-year contract with the Intermarché–Wanty–Gobert Matériaux team.

Meintjes finished in 6th place in the 2022 Critérium du Dauphiné, his best result in a stage race in five years. During the Tour de France he rode at the front of the race up Alpe d'Huez and was in contention of winning before being dropped by Tom Pidcock. He climbed to 13th place overall after this stage and two days later he got involved in another breakaway; finishing over +11:00 ahead of the GC favourites and moving into 7th place overall, jumping ahead of Gaudu, Pidcock and Enric Mas. He survived the finishes at Peyragudes and Hautacam as the race crossed the Pyrenees; and had a realistic chance at finishing top 5 overall going into the final time trial. He ended up 8th after having a tough day in the ITT, this made for the third time in his career he finished top 10, all of them 8th place, and the first since 2017.

At the 2022 Vuelta a España, Meintjes won Stage 9, which was his first ever Grand Tour stage win.

== Major results ==
2010
National Junior Road Championships

1st Time trial
1st Road race

2011
1st Stage 3 Triptyque Ardennais
African Road Championships

2nd Team time trial
2nd Time trial

2nd Road race, National Under-23 Road Championships
3rd Sint-Lambrechts-Herk
4th Overall Anatomic Jock Race
5th Walhain Road Race
2012
National Under-23 Road Championships

1st Time trial
2nd Road race

5th Overall Sea Otter Classic
6th Overall Tour des Pays de Savoie
2013
National Road Championships

1st Under-23 road race
1st Under-23 time trial
2nd Road race
4th Time trial

2nd Road race, UCI Under-23 Road World Championships
2nd Overall Tour of Rwanda

1st Stage 3

4th Overall Tour de Taiwan
9th Overall Tour de Korea

1st Stage 5 (TTT)

10th Overall La Tropicale Amissa Bongo
2014 (1 pro win)
National Road Championships

1st Road race
1st Under-23 road race
1st Under-23 time trial

2nd Overall Mzansi Tour

1st Mountains classification
1st Young rider classification
1st Stage 2

5th Overall Giro del Trentino

1st Young rider classification

8th Time trial, UCI Under-23 Road World Championships
2015 (3)
African Road Championships

1st Road race
2nd Team time trial
4th Time trial

1st Overall Settimana Internazionale di Coppi e Bartali

1st Stage 4

1st Mountains classification, Circuit de la Sarthe
3rd Time trial, National Road Championships
6th Overall Tour of Oman

1st Young rider classification

8th Overall Giro del Trentino

1st Young rider classification

10th Overall Vuelta a España
2016
7th Road race, Olympic Games
8th Overall Tour de France
9th Overall Critérium du Dauphiné
2017
6th Overall Tour of the Basque Country
8th Overall Critérium du Dauphiné
8th Overall Tour de France
2018
9th Overall Vuelta a Burgos
2019
3rd Time trial, National Road Championships
2022 (2)
1st Giro dell'Appennino
1st Stage 9 Vuelta a España
3rd Overall Giro di Sicilia
6th Overall Critérium du Dauphiné
6th Mercan'Tour Classic
7th Overall Tour de France
2023
2nd Overall Giro di Sicilia
7th Overall Critérium du Dauphiné
8th Mercan'Tour Classic
2024 (1)
1st Stage 4 Tour of the Basque Country

=== General classification results timeline ===
Grand Tour general classification results
Grand Tour	2014	2015	2016	2017	2018	2019	2020	2021	2022	2023	2024	2025
Giro d'Italia	—	—	—	—	DNF	—	36	—	—	—	—	18
Tour de France	—	DNF	8	8	—	—	—	14	7	DNF	20	—
Vuelta a España	55	10	40	12	58	51	—	DNF	11	—	28	16
Major stage race general classification results
Race	2014	2015	2016	2017	2018	2019	2020	2021	2022	2023	2024	2025
Paris–Nice	—	—	22	—	—	DNF	—	23	—	—	—	—
Tirreno–Adriatico	—	39	—	—	17	—	12	—	—	—	—	—
Volta a Catalunya	—	—	DNF	35	52	—	NH	DNF	46	DNF	44	40
Tour of the Basque Country	—	—	DNF	6	—	—	NH	—	—	—	40	—
Tour de Romandie	—	—	DNF	20	—	34	NH	20	32	19	29	—
Critérium du Dauphiné	—	52	9	8	—	—	49	17	6	7	14	18
Tour de Suisse	26	—	—	—	—	—	NH	—	—	—	—	—

Legend
—	Did not compete
DNF	Did not finish
NH	Not held
IP	In progress
