= Edoardo Zardini (cyclist) =

Italian cyclist

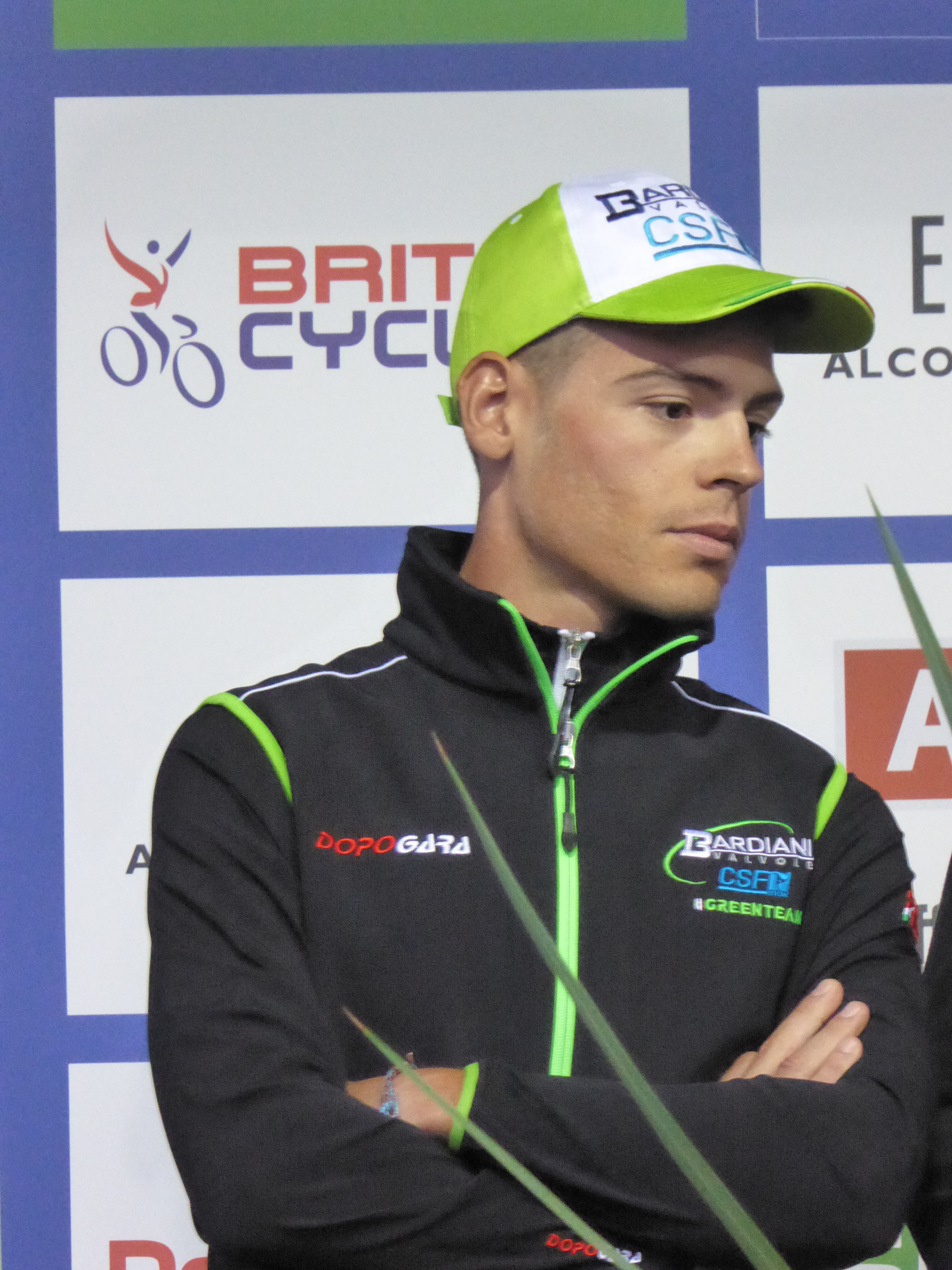
- Zardini at the 2016 Tour of Britain

Personal information
- Full name: Edoardo Zardini
- Born: 2 November 1989 (age 36) Peschiera del Garda, Italy
- Height: 1.73 m (5 ft 8 in)
- Weight: 62 kg (137 lb)

Cycling career
- Sport: Cycling
- Current team: Retired
- Discipline: Road
- Role: Rider
- Rider type: Climber

Amateur teams
- 2007: U.S. Ausonia
- 2008–2010: VC Mantovani Rovigo
- 2011–2012: Team Colpack

Professional teams
- 2013–2017: Bardiani Valvole–CSF Inox
- 2018–2021: Wilier Triestina–Selle Italia
- 2022: Drone Hopper–Androni Giocattoli

Edoardo Zardini (born 2 November 1989) is an Italian former racing cyclist, who competed as a professional from 2013 to 2022. Zardini won stage 3 of the 2014 Tour of Britain with a breakaway ascent of The Tumble in Monmouthshire and also became the new race leader.

== Major results ==
2009
9th Cronoscalata Gardone Val Trompia — Prati di Caregno
2010
4th Trofeo Zsšdi
9th Overall Girobio
2011
4th Trofeo della Luganega di Palù
2012
3rd Overall Giro del Friuli-Venezia Giulia
6th Overall Girobio
9th Piccolo Giro di Lombardia
2013
4th Overall Danmark Rundt
6th Giro dell'Emilia
2014
1st Stage 2 Giro del Trentino
4th Overall Tour of Britain

1st Stage 3

4th Giro dell'Emilia
8th Tre Valli Varesine
2015
8th Giro dell'Appennino
9th Giro dell'Emilia
10th Overall Giro del Trentino
2016
8th Gran Premio della Costa Etruschi
2018
4th Overall Tour of Antalya
7th Overall Czech Cycling Tour
2019
4th Overall Tour de Hongrie
2020
9th Overall Tour of Antalya
2022
7th Overall International Tour of Hellas

=== Grand Tour general classification results timeline ===
| Grand Tour | 2013 | 2014 | 2015 | 2016 | 2017 | 2018 | 2019 | 2020 | 2021 | 2022 |
|---|---|---|---|---|---|---|---|---|---|---|
| Giro d'Italia | 138 | 53 | 82 | — | — | DNF | — | 96 | — | 78 |
| Tour de France | Has not contested during his career | | | | | | | | | |
| Vuelta a España | Has not contested during his career | | | | | | | | | |

Legend
| — | Did not compete |
| DNF | Did not finish |
