= Sebastian Lander =

Danish cyclist (born 1991)

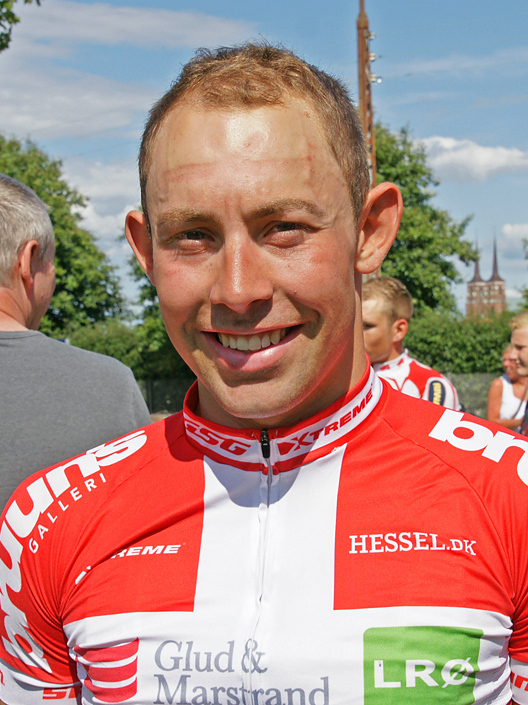
- Lander at the 2012 Post Cup

Personal information
- Full name: Sebastian Lander
- Born: 11 March 1991 (age 35) Køge, Denmark
- Height: 1.75 m (5 ft 9 in)
- Weight: 70.5 kg (155 lb)

Cycling career
- Sport: Cycling
- Disciplines: Road; Track
- Role: Rider
- Rider type: Classics specialist; Puncheur

Amateur team
- 2002–2007: Køge CR

Professional teams
- 2008–2009: Glud & Marstrand–Horsens
- 2010–2011: Concordia Forsikring–Himmerland
- 2012: Glud & Marstrand–LRØ
- 2013–2014: BMC Racing Team
- 2015: Team TreFor–Blue Water
- 2016: ONE Pro Cycling
- 2017: GM Europa Ovini
- 2018: Riwal CeramicSpeed

Major wins
- One-day races and Classics National Road Race Championships (2012)

Sebastian Lander (born 11 March 1991) is a Danish professional road bicycle racer and track cyclist, who last rode for UCI Continental team Riwal CeramicSpeed. In 2012, Lander won the Danish National Road Race Championships.

Lander raced at the UCI Continental level for Glud & Marstrand–LRØ in the 2008, 2009 and 2012 seasons, and for Concordia Forsikring–Himmerland in the 2010 and 2011 seasons. He joined the World Tour team BMC Racing Team for the 2013 and 2014 seasons, riding in the 2013 Vuelta a España.

He returned to the Continental level for the 2015 season with Team TreFor–Blue Water, but signed for ONE Pro Cycling for the 2016 season, at which they raced at Pro Continental level.

== Major results ==
2008
1st Stage 2 Trofeo Karlsberg
2nd Road race, National Junior Road Championships
3rd Road race, UCI Juniors World Championships
2009
1st Prologue Tre Ciclistica Internazionale Bresciana
3rd Time trial, National Junior Road Championships
7th Paris–Roubaix Juniors
2010
1st Stage 1 Coupe des nations Ville Saguenay
3rd Liège–Bastogne–Liège U23
3rd Designa Grand Prix
8th Road race, UCI Under-23 Road World Championships
9th Overall Grand Prix du Portugal
2011
4th La Côte Picarde
7th Eschborn-Frankfurt City Loop U23
8th Poreč Trophy
9th Overall Coupe des nations Ville Saguenay
9th Handelsbanken Grand Prix
2012
1st Road race, National Road Championships
1st Road race, National Under-23 Road Championships
4th Himmerland Rundt
4th Ster van Zwolle
5th Dwars door Drenthe
8th Eschborn-Frankfurt City Loop U23
9th Grand Prix de la Ville de Lillers
10th Overall Coupe des nations Ville Saguenay

1st Stage 4

2014
1st Stage 1 (TTT) Giro del Trentino
1st Sprints classification Tour of Britain
2015
8th Overall Tour du Loir-et-Cher
2018
6th Veenendaal–Veenendaal Classic

=== Grand Tour general classification results timeline ===
Grand Tour	2013
Giro d'Italia	—
Tour de France	—
Vuelta a España	DNF

Legend
—	Did not compete
DNF	Did not finish
