= Leopold König =

Czech road cyclist

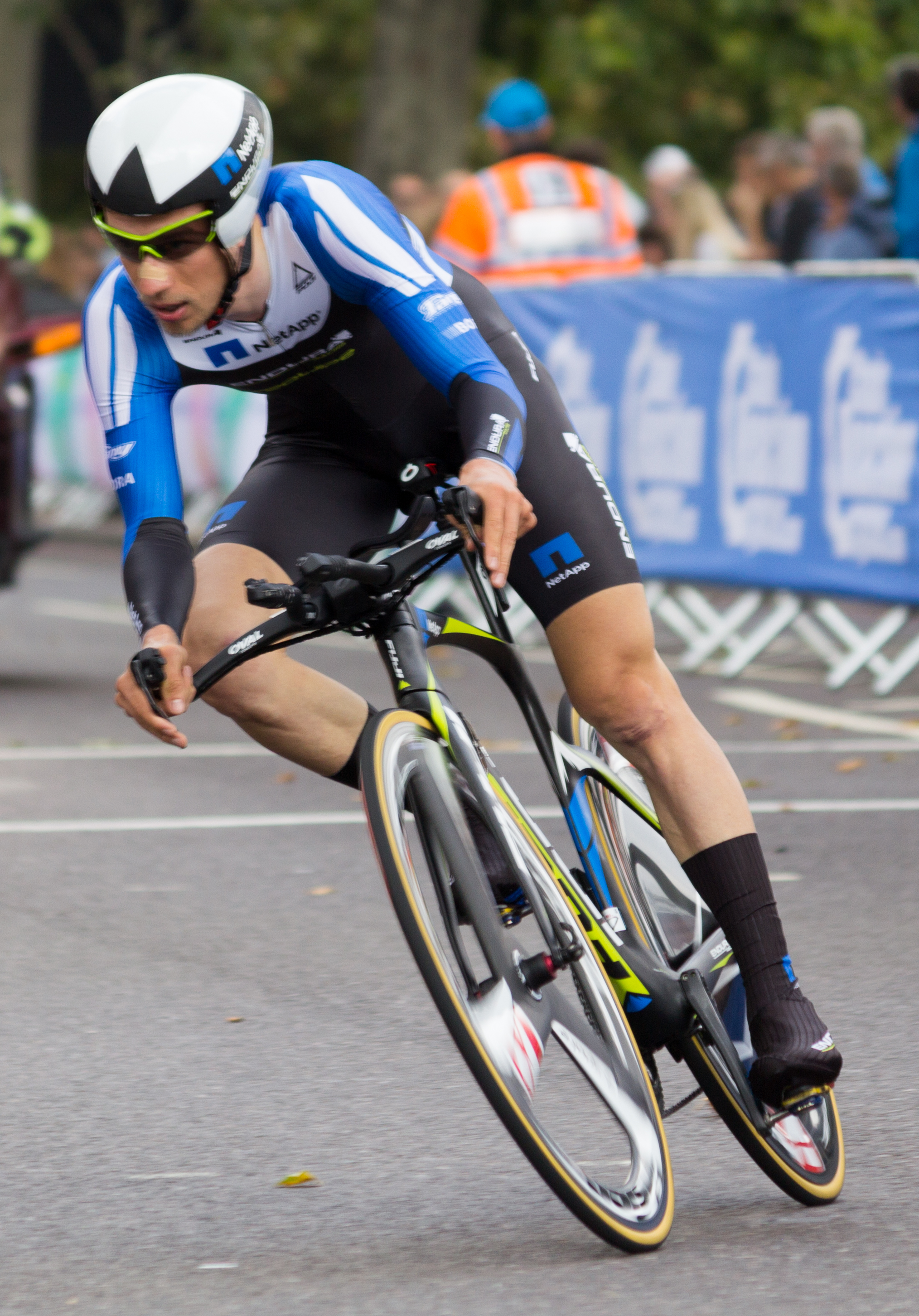
- König at the 2014 Tour of Britain

Personal information
- Full name: Leopold König
- Born: 15 November 1987 (age 38) Moravská Třebová, Czechoslovakia
- Height: 1.78 m (5 ft 10 in)
- Weight: 62 kg (137 lb)

Cycling career
- Sport: Cycling
- Current team: Retired
- Discipline: Road
- Role: Rider
- Rider type: All-rounder

Professional teams
- 2006–2010: PSK Whirlpool–Hradec Krlove
- 2011–2014: Team NetApp
- 2015–2016: Team Sky
- 2017–2019: Bora–Hansgrohe

Major wins
- Grand Tours Vuelta a España 1 individual stage (2013) 1 TTT stage (2016) One-day races and Classics National Time Trial Championships (2016)

Leopold König (born 15 November 1987) is a Czech former professional road cyclist, who rode professionally between 2006 and 2019 for the PSK Whirlpool–Author, NetApp–Endura, Team Sky and Bora–Hansgrohe teams. Since retiring, he has acted as the race director for the Czech Cycling Tour and the Course de la Paix U23 – Grand Prix Jeseníky.

== Career ==
=== Early career ===
Born in the small Czech town of Moravská Třebová, 100 miles (160 kilometres) east of Prague, König as a child played ice hockey, using his bike solely for fitness until he started road racing at the age of 14.

=== Team NetApp (2011–2014) ===
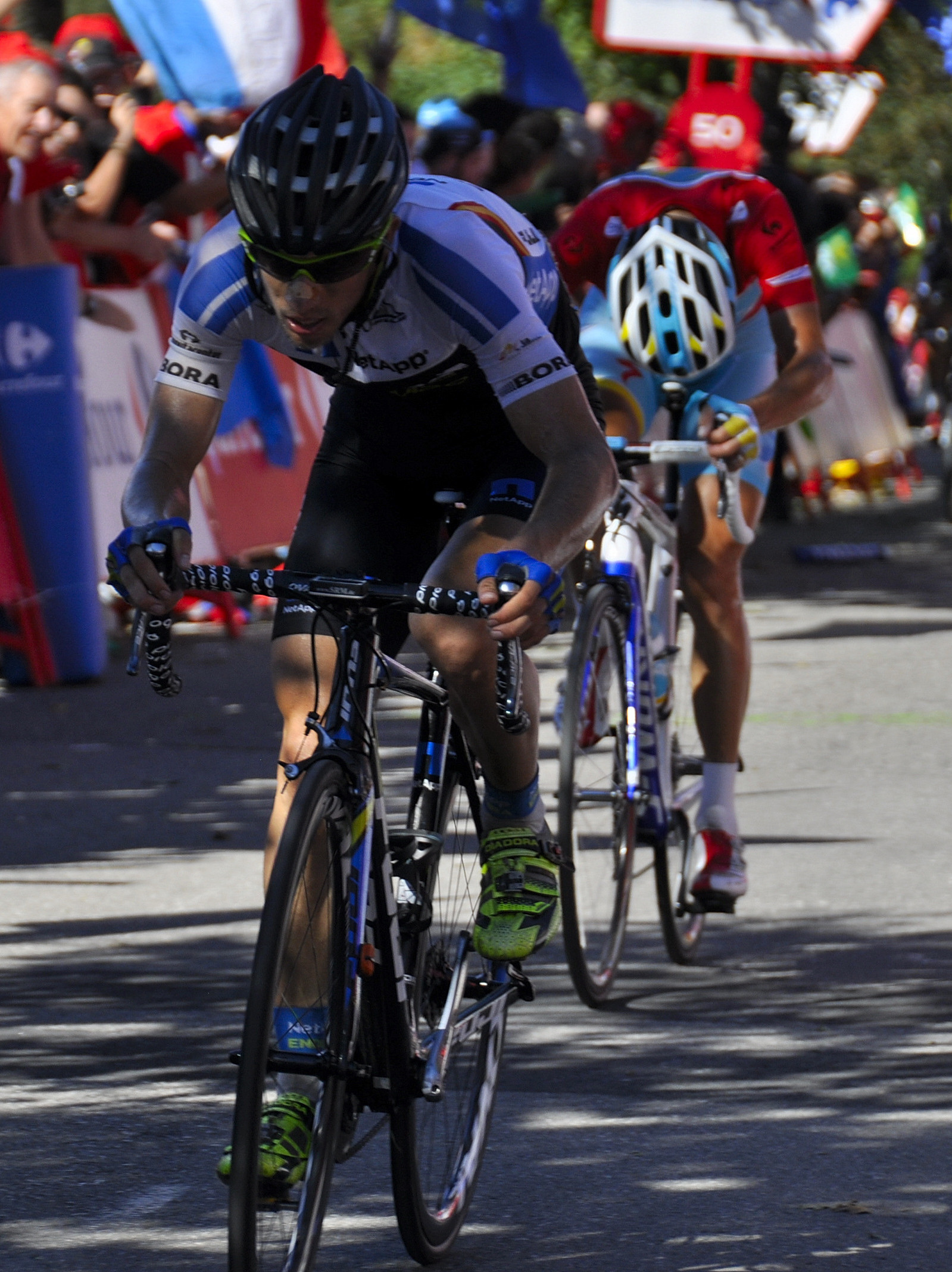
König at the 2013 Vuelta a España, where he achieved a stage victory.

König was a stage winner in Caerphilly in September 2012 at the Tour of Britain and in May 2013, he won the queen stage of the Tour of California finishing atop Mount Diablo. König detached himself from a small group in the final kilometers and caught Janier Acevedo, dropping him with only 300 m (980 ft) to go.

However both these wins were eclipsed in August 2013 when he claimed his team's maiden Grand Tour victory by winning a mountain stage to Alto Peñas Blancas in the Vuelta a España after catching climber Igor Antón in the final 500 metres.

König took part in his first Tour de France in 2014, finishing seventh overall after rising two places from ninth by placing fifth in the final time trial.

=== Team Sky (2015–2016) ===
König signed for Team Sky for the 2015 season. König achieved his first podium place for the team, scoring third place at the Trofeo Serra de Tramuntana. In the Giro d'Italia, he took over the leadership role as his leader Richie Porte suffered a massive loss of time and ultimately withdrew. On Stage 16 featuring the Mortirolo Pass, König was docked 10 seconds for holding onto cars. König performed well in the final stages but not well enough to secure a top 5 finish, finishing 6th overall.

=== Bora–Hansgrohe (2017–2019) ===
After two years with Team Sky, König returned to his former team – now known as Bora–Hansgrohe – on a three-year contract. In the first half of the 2017 season, König only competed in two races due to injury. Following his injury-related withdrawal from the 2018 Tirreno–Adriatico, Konig did not race again for the team over the remaining 21 months of his contract, and had no interaction with his Bora–Hansgrohe teammates.

== Major results ==
2005
7th Overall Giro della Lunigiana
2007
9th Overall Okolo Slovenska
2009
6th Grand Prix Kooperativa
9th Grand Prix Boka
2010
1st Overall Oberösterreich Rundfahrt

1st Stage 1

1st Overall Czech Cycling Tour

1st Stage 2

1st Stage 3 Tour of Bulgaria
3rd Time trial, National Road Championships
3rd Prague–Karlovy Vary–Prague
5th Overall Szlakiem Grodów Piastowskich
2011
2nd Road race, National Road Championships
2nd Overall Tour of Austria

1st Young rider classification

3rd Overall Tour de l'Ain
9th Overall Tour of Britain
2012
1st Stage 2b (TTT) Settimana Internazionale di Coppi e Bartali
3rd Overall Tour of Utah
6th Grand Prix of Aargau Canton
10th Overall Tour of Britain

1st Stage 6

2013
1st Overall Czech Cycling Tour

1st Stage 3

1st Stage 7 Tour of California
6th Overall Settimana Internazionale di Coppi e Bartali
9th Overall Vuelta a España

1st Stage 8

2014
4th Overall Bayern–Rundfahrt
7th Overall Tour de France
2015
National Road Championships

2nd Road race
2nd Time trial

3rd Overall Giro del Trentino
3rd Trofeo Serra de Tramuntana
5th Trofeo Andratx-Mirador d'Es Colomer
6th Overall Giro d'Italia
8th Overall Abu Dhabi Tour
10th Overall Czech Cycling Tour

1st Stage 3

2016
1st Time trial, National Road Championships
1st Stage 1 (TTT) Vuelta a España
9th Trofeo Pollenca-Port de Andratx
10th Overall Volta a la Comunitat Valenciana

=== Grand Tour general classification results timeline ===
Grand Tour	2013	2014	2015	2016
Giro d'Italia	—	—	6	—
Tour de France	—	7	70	—
Vuelta a España	9	—	—	29

Legend
—	Did not compete
DNF	Did not finish
