= Yannick Eijssen =

Belgian cyclist

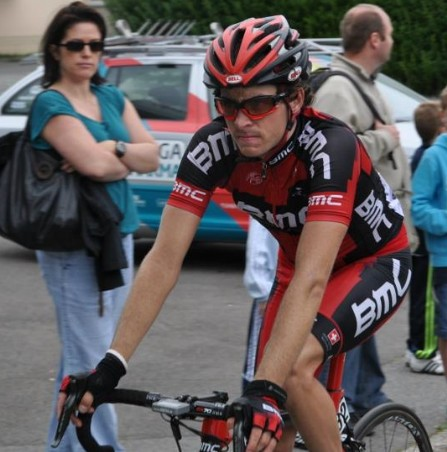
- Eijssen at the 2012 Tour de Wallonie

Personal information
- Full name: Yannick Eijssen
- Born: June 26, 1989 (age 37) Leuven, Belgium
- Height: 1.74 m (5 ft 9 in)
- Weight: 60 kg (132 lb)

Cycling career
- Sport: Cycling
- Current team: Retired
- Discipline: Road
- Role: Rider
- Rider type: Climber

Amateur teams
- 2008–2010: Team PWS Eyssen-Kempen
- 2009: Silence–Lotto (stagiaire)

Professional teams
- 2011–2014: BMC Racing Team
- 2015: Wanty–Groupe Gobert
- 2016: Crelan–Vastgoedservice

Yannick Eijssen (born 26 June 1989) is a retired Belgian cyclist, born in Leuven, Belgium. Eijssen last rode for UCI Continental team Pauwels Sauzen–Vastgoedservice. Being considered a great talent in the youth categories, Eijssen started his professional career at UCI ProTeam BMC Racing Team. However, on the pro level, Eijssen never lived up to the expectations, and in May 2016, age 26, he announced his retirement at the end of the season.

== Career achievements ==
=== Major results ===
2008
4th Grote Prijs Stad Waregem
6th Overall Ronde de l'Isard
2009
3rd Overall Tour des Pays de Savoie
2010
1st Overall Ronde de l'Isard

1st Stage 3

1st Beverbeek Classic
1st Stage 4 Tour de l'Avenir
2nd Road race, National Under−23 Road Championships
3rd Overall Tour des Pyrénées
6th U23 Liège–Bastogne–Liège
2012
1st Stage 1 (TTT) Giro del Trentino
2014
1st Stage 1 (TTT) Giro del Trentino

=== Grand Tour general classification results timeline ===
Grand Tour	2012	2013	2014
Giro d'Italia	—	—	DNF
Tour de France	—	—	—
Vuelta a España	119	83	—

Legend
—	Did not compete
DNF	Did not finish
