= Martin Kohler =

Swiss cyclist (born 1985)

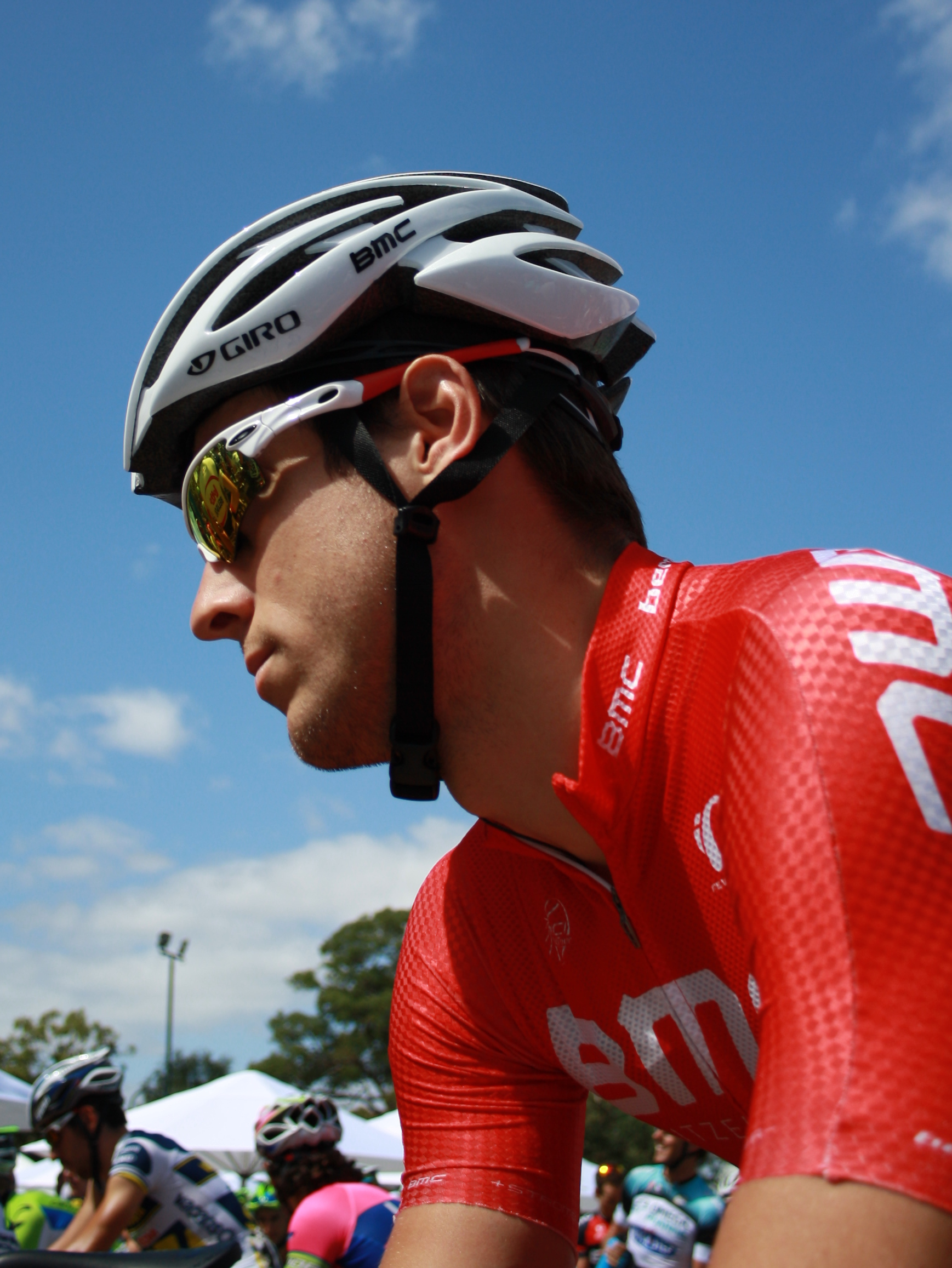
- Kohler at the 2013 Tour Down Under

Personal information
- Full name: Martin Kohler
- Born: 17 July 1985 (age 41) Walenstadt, Switzerland
- Height: 1.77 m (5 ft 9 1/2 in)
- Weight: 69 kg (152 lb)

Cycling career
- Sport: Cycling
- Current team: Retired
- Discipline: Road
- Role: Rider

Amateur team
- 2007: Hadimec (stagiaire)

Professional teams
- 2008–2014: BMC Racing Team
- 2015: Drapac Professional Cycling
- 2016: Team Roth

Major wins
- Stage races Tour de l'Avenir 1 stage Giro del Trentino 1 stage (TTT) (2014) One-day races and Classics National Time Trial Championships (2011) National Road Race Championships (2012)

Martin Kohler (born 17 July 1985) is a Swiss former road racing cyclist, who rode professionally between 2008 and 2016 for the BMC Racing Team, Drapac Professional Cycling and Team Roth squads.

He competed in the 2010 Giro d'Italia but had to withdraw in the second stage due to a crash.

Kohler won the Swiss National Time Trial Championships in 2011 and the Swiss National Road Race Championships in 2012.

== Major results ==
2007
1st Stage 4 Tour de l'Avenir
2008
1st GP Kyburg
2011
1st Time trial, National Road Championships
2012
1st Road race, National Road Championships
2013
3rd Road race, National Road Championships
2014
1st Sprints classification Tour de Romandie
1st Stage 1 (TTT) Giro del Trentino
4th Road race, National Road Championships

=== Grand Tour general classification results timeline ===
Grand Tour	2011	2012	2013	2014
Giro d'Italia	DNF	—	—	—
Tour de France	—	—	—	—
Vuelta a España	111	—	66	—

Legend
—	Did not compete
DNF	Did not finish
