= Rick Zabel =

German bicycle racer

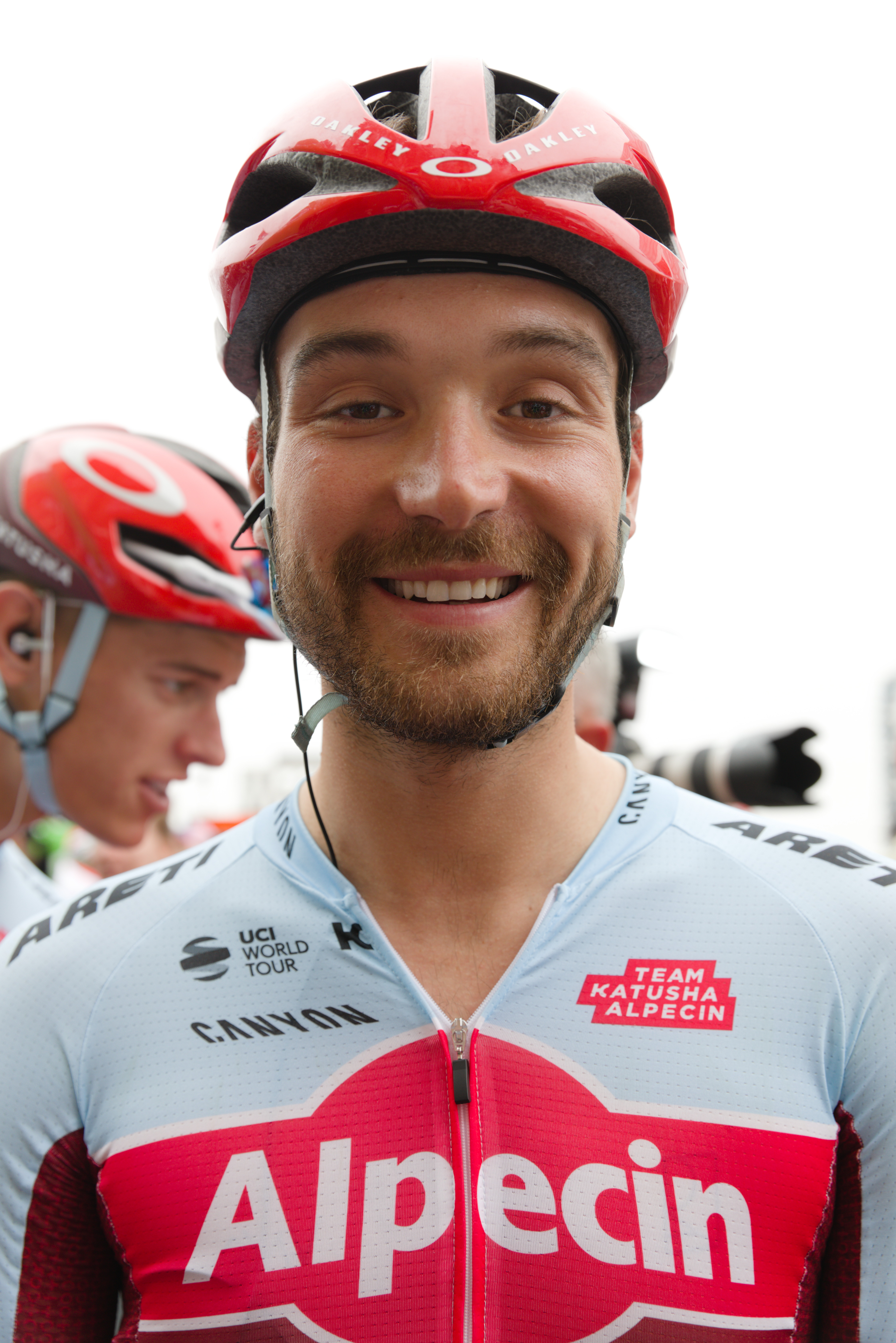
- Zabel at the 2018 Rund um Köln

Personal information
- Full name: Rick Zabel
- Nickname: The Lion
- Born: 7 December 1993 (age 32) Unna, Germany
- Height: 1.84 m (6 ft 1/2 in)
- Weight: 90 kg (198 lb; 14 st 2 lb)

Cycling career
- Sport: Cycling
- Discipline: Road
- Role: Rider
- Rider type: Sprinter

Amateur team
- 2012–2013: Rabobank Continental Team

Professional teams
- 2014–2016: BMC Racing Team
- 2017–2019: Team Katusha–Alpecin
- 2020–2024: Israel Start-Up Nation

Rick Zabel (born 7 December 1993) is a German former road bicycle racer, who competed as a professional from 2014 to May 2024. He is the son of Erik Zabel and grandson of Detlef Zabel.

== Cycling career ==
Born in Unna, Zabel won the National Novice Track Championships in 2009, in the Madison event. In 2010 he enjoyed more success in track events, and in 2011, at the UCI Road World Championships in Copenhagen, he was fifth in the men's junior road race.

By summer of 2011 Zabel visited the Pierre de Coubertin sport gymnasium in Erfurt. He left high school without a diploma, in order to sign his first professional contract with the Rabobank Continental Team for the 2012 season. In 2012 he triumphed in the German road championship in the U23 class. In 2013, Zabel won the under-23 Tour of Flanders, and won a stage at the Tour de Normandie.

For the 2014 season, Zabel turned professional with the BMC Racing Team.

On 6 May 2015, Zabel was named in BMC's team for the Giro d'Italia, giving him his first Grand Tour start. On 7 July 2015, his father's 45th birthday, Zabel celebrated his first victory as a professional, winning stage 3 of the Tour of Austria.

In June 2017, he was named in the startlist for the Tour de France.

In May 2019, he won his second professional race in a sprint finish on stage two of the Tour de Yorkshire.

In May 2024, he announced his retirement from the sport following the Rund um Köln.

== Major results ==
2009
1st Madison, National Novice Track Championships (with Thomas Schneider)
2010
National Junior Track Championships

2nd Madison (with Thomas Schneider)
3rd Points race
3rd Team pursuit

2011
4th Overall Driedaagse van Axel
5th Road race, UCI Junior Road World Championships
2012
1st Road race, National Under-23 Road Championships
2nd Ronde van Limburg
9th GP Raf Jonckheere
2013
1st Ronde van Vlaanderen Beloften
1st Stage 5 Tour de Normandie
4th Overall Tour de Gironde
6th Paris–Tours Espoirs
7th La Côte Picarde
7th Münsterland Giro
8th Overall Olympia's Tour
10th Arno Wallaard Memorial
2014
1st Stage 1 (TTT) Giro del Trentino
6th Eschborn–Frankfurt City Loop
2015 (1 pro win)
1st Stage 3 Tour of Austria
2016
4th Volta Limburg Classic
2017
2nd Eschborn–Frankfurt – Rund um den Finanzplatz
9th Paris–Bourges
2018
10th Overall Dubai Tour
2019 (1)
1st Stage 2 Tour de Yorkshire
8th Grand Prix of Aargau Canton
2020
Giro d'Italia

Held after Stage 1

2022
Giro d'Italia

Held after Stage 3
Combativity award Stage 2

=== Grand Tour general classification results timeline ===
Grand Tour	2015	2016	2017	2018	2019	2020	2021	2022
Giro d'Italia	142	140	—	—	—	123	—	137
Tour de France	—	—	145	DNF	DNF	—	134	—
Vuelta a España	Did not contest during his career							

Legend
—	Did not compete
DNF	Did not finish
