= 2014 Giro del Trentino =

2014 UCI Europe Tour

Race details
- Dates: 22–25 April 2014
- Stages: 4
- Distance: 538.2 km (334.4 mi)
- Winning time: 14h 14' 03"

Results
Jersey awarded to the overall winner	Winner	Cadel Evans (AUS)	(BMC Racing Team)
	Second	Domenico Pozzovivo (ITA)	(Ag2r–La Mondiale)
	Third	Przemysław Niemiec (POL)	(Lampre–Merida)
Jersey awarded to the mountains classification winner	Mountains	Jonathan Monsalve (VEN)	(Neri Sottoli)
Jersey awarded to the young rider classification winner	Young rider	Louis Meintjes (RSA)	(MTN–Qhubeka)
Jersey awarded to the sprints classification winner	Sprints	Leonardo Duque (COL)	(Colombia)
	Team	Astana	

The 2014 Giro del Trentino is the 38th edition of the Giro del Trentino cycling stage race. It started on 22 April in Riva del Garda and ended on 25 April on the top of Monte Bondone. The race consisted of four stages; it started with a team time trial on the same route of the first stage in the 2012 edition of the race, and ended on Monte Bondone for the queen stage. The race was part of the 2014 UCI Europe Tour, and was rated as a 2.HC event.

Australian rider Cadel Evans of BMC Racing Team won the General Classification, claiming the leader's jersey in second stage (won by the Italian Edoardo Zardini), and securing his lead by winning the third. Ag2r–La Mondiale's Domenico Pozzovivo was second in the General Classification and Przemysław Niemiec of Lampre–Merida was third. Colombian Leonardo Duque (Colombia) won the red jersey of the Intermediate Sprints Classification, Jonathan Monsalve of Venezuela (Neri Sottoli) won the King of the Mountains Classification and South African Louis Meintjes (MTN–Qhubeka) finished first in the Young Rider Classification. Astana won the Teams Classification.

== Race overview ==
The race was officially presented on 14 April in Trento.

Stage	Date	Course	Distance	Type	Winner	Ref
1	22 April	Riva del Garda to Arco	14.3 km (8.9 mi)	Team time trial	BMC Racing Team	
2	23 April	Limone sul Garda to San Giacomo di Brentonico	164.5 km (102.2 mi)	Mountain stage	Edoardo Zardini (ITA)	
3	24 April	Mori to Roncone	184.4 km (114.6 mi)	Mountain stage	Cadel Evans (AUS)	
4	25 April	Val Daone to Monte Bondone	175 km (108.7 mi)	Mountain stage	Mikel Landa (ESP)	
Total		538.2 km (334.4 mi)				

== Teams ==
The start list includes 16 teams. Among the riders, pre-race favourites were Cadel Evans (BMC Racing Team), Michele Scarponi (Astana) and Bradley Wiggins (Team Sky); other notable riders who are taking part in the race are Domenico Pozzovivo, Ivan Basso, Franco Pellizotti, Giovanni Visconti, Luis León Sánchez and Moreno Moser. The defending champion Vincenzo Nibali did not participate in the race.

ProTeams

- Ag2r–La Mondiale
- Astana
- BMC Racing Team
- Cannondale
- Lampre–Merida
- Movistar Team
- Team Sky

Professional Continental Teams

- Androni Giocattoli–Venezuela
- Bardiani–CSF
- Caja Rural–Seguros RGA
- CCC–Polsat–Polkowice
- Colombia
- MTN–Qhubeka
- Neri Sottoli
- NetApp–Endura
- RusVelo

== Stages ==
=== Stage 1 ===
22 April 2014 — Riva del Garda to Arco, 14.3 km (8.9 mi) team time trial (TTT)

Stage 1 Result

	Team	Time
1	BMC Racing Team	14' 12"
2	NetApp–Endura	+ 5"
3	Team Sky	+ 9"
4	Movistar Team	+ 12"
5	Cannondale	+ 13"
6	Astana	+ 19"
7	RusVelo	+ 21"
8	Lampre–Merida	+ 23"
9	CCC–Polsat–Polkowice	+ 26"
10	Colombia	+ 27"

General Classification after Stage 1

	Rider	Team	Time
1	Daniel Oss (ITA)	BMC Racing Team	14' 12"
2	Cadel Evans (AUS)	BMC Racing Team	+ 0"
3	Rick Zabel (GER)	BMC Racing Team	+ 0"
4	Steve Morabito (SUI)	BMC Racing Team	+ 0"
5	Brent Bookwalter (USA)	BMC Racing Team	+ 0"
6	Yannick Eijssen (BEL)	BMC Racing Team	+ 0"
7	Iker Camaño (ESP)	NetApp–Endura	+ 5"
8	David de la Cruz (ESP)	NetApp–Endura	+ 5"
9	Leopold König (CZE)	NetApp–Endura	+ 5"
10	José Mendes (POR)	NetApp–Endura	+ 5"

=== Stage 2 ===
23 April 2014 — Limone sul Garda to San Giacomo di Brentonico, 164.5 km (102.2 mi)

Stage 2 Result

	Rider	Team	Time
1	Edoardo Zardini (ITA)	Bardiani–CSF	4h 25' 39"
2	Przemysław Niemiec (POL)	Lampre–Merida	+ 19"
3	Fabio Duarte (COL)	Colombia	+ 19"
4	Cadel Evans (AUS)	BMC Racing Team	+ 19"
5	Domenico Pozzovivo (ITA)	Ag2r–La Mondiale	+ 23"
6	Fabio Aru (ITA)	Astana	+ 26"
7	Franco Pellizotti (ITA)	Androni Giocattoli–Venezuela	+ 36"
8	Omar Fraile (ESP)	Caja Rural–Seguros RGA	+ 36"
9	Igor Antón (ESP)	Movistar Team	+ 38"
10	Tiago Machado (POR)	NetApp–Endura	+ 38"

General Classification after Stage 2

	Rider	Team	Time
1	Cadel Evans (AUS)	BMC Racing Team	4h 40' 10"
2	Edoardo Zardini (ITA)	Bardiani–CSF	+ 9"
3	Przemysław Niemiec (POL)	Lampre–Merida	+ 17"
4	Fabio Duarte (COL)	Colombia	+ 23"
5	Tiago Machado (POR)	NetApp–Endura	+ 24"
6	Fabio Aru (ITA)	Astana	+ 26"
7	Igor Antón (ESP)	Movistar Team	+ 31"
8	Steve Morabito (SUI)	BMC Racing Team	+ 36"
9	Michele Scarponi (ITA)	Astana	+ 38"
10	Domenico Pozzovivo (ITA)	Ag2r–La Mondiale	+ 38"

=== Stage 3 ===
24 April 2014 — Mori to Roncone, 184.4 km (114.6 mi)

Stage 3 Result

	Rider	Team	Time
1	Cadel Evans (AUS)	BMC Racing Team	4h 43' 43"
2	Domenico Pozzovivo (ITA)	Ag2r–La Mondiale	+ 3"
3	Mikel Landa (ESP)	Astana	+ 9"
4	Michele Scarponi (ITA)	Astana	+ 18"
5	Igor Antón (ESP)	Movistar Team	+ 20"
6	Francesco Bongiorno (ITA)	Bardiani–CSF	+ 25"
7	Fabio Aru (ITA)	Astana	+ 25"
8	Tiago Machado (POR)	NetApp–Endura	+ 25"
9	Louis Meintjes (RSA)	MTN–Qhubeka	+ 27"
10	Fabio Duarte (COL)	Colombia	+ 28"

General Classification after Stage 3

	Rider	Team	Time
1	Cadel Evans (AUS)	BMC Racing Team	9h 23' 43"
2	Domenico Pozzovivo (ITA)	Ag2r–La Mondiale	+ 45"
3	Tiago Machado (POR)	NetApp–Endura	+ 59"
4	Igor Antón (ESP)	Movistar Team	+ 1' 01"
5	Fabio Aru (ITA)	Astana	+ 1' 01"
6	Przemysław Niemiec (POL)	Lampre–Merida	+ 1' 01"
7	Fabio Duarte (COL)	Colombia	+ 1' 01"
8	Edoardo Zardini (ITA)	Bardiani–CSF	+ 1' 04"
9	Michele Scarponi (ITA)	Astana	+ 1' 06"
10	Francesco Bongiorno (ITA)	Bardiani–CSF	+ 1' 32"

=== Stage 4 ===
25 April 2014 — Val Daone to Monte Bondone, 175 km (108.7 mi)

Stage 4 Result

	Rider	Team	Time
1	Mikel Landa (ESP)	Astana	4h 49' 39"
2	Louis Meintjes (RSA)	MTN–Qhubeka	+ 10"
3	Franco Pellizotti (ITA)	Androni Giocattoli–Venezuela	+ 35"
4	Przemysław Niemiec (POL)	Lampre–Merida	+ 41"
5	Cadel Evans (AUS)	BMC Racing Team	+ 41"
6	Fabio Duarte (COL)	Colombia	+ 41"
7	Domenico Pozzovivo (ITA)	Ag2r–La Mondiale	+ 46"
8	Michele Scarponi (ITA)	Astana	+ 46"
9	Tiago Machado (POR)	NetApp–Endura	+ 49"
10	Fabio Aru (ITA)	Astana	+ 49"

Final General Classification

	Rider	Team	Time
1	Cadel Evans (AUS)	BMC Racing Team	14h 14' 03"
2	Domenico Pozzovivo (ITA)	Ag2r–La Mondiale	+ 50"
3	Przemysław Niemiec (POL)	Lampre–Merida	+ 1' 01"
4	Fabio Duarte (COL)	Colombia	+ 1' 01"
5	Louis Meintjes (RSA)	MTN–Qhubeka	+ 1' 06"
6	Tiago Machado (POR)	NetApp–Endura	+ 1' 07"
7	Fabio Aru (ITA)	Astana	+ 1' 09"
8	Michele Scarponi (ITA)	Astana	+ 1' 11"
9	Franco Pellizotti (ITA)	Androni Giocattoli–Venezuela	+ 1' 26"
10	Mikel Landa (ESP)	Astana	+ 1' 32"

== Classification leadership table ==
Stage	Winner	General classification	Mountains classification	Young rider classification	Intermediate sprints classification	Teams classification
1	BMC Racing Team	Daniel Oss	not awarded	Rick Zabel	not awarded	BMC Racing Team
2	Edoardo Zardini	Cadel Evans	Giorgio Cecchinel	Fabio Aru	Leonardo Duque	Astana
3	Cadel Evans	Cadel Evans	Jonathan Monsalve	Fabio Aru	Adriano Malori	Astana
4	Mikel Landa	Cadel Evans	Jonathan Monsalve	Louis Meintjes	Leonardo Duque	Astana
Final		Cadel Evans	Jonathan Monsalve	Louis Meintjes	Leonardo Duque	Astana
