= List of 2015 UCI WorldTeams and riders =

This page is a list of 2015 UCI WorldTeams and riders. These teams competed in the 2015 UCI World Tour. Prior to the 2015 season these teams were referred to as UCI ProTeams.

== Teams overview ==
2015 UCI World Teams and equipment
| Code | Official team name | Licence holder | Country | Groupset | Bicycles |
|---|---|---|---|---|---|
| ALM | AG2R La Mondiale (2015 season) | EUSRL France Cyclisme | France | SRAM | Focus |
| AST | Astana (2015 season) | Abacanto SA | Kazakhstan | Campagnolo | Specialized |
| BMC | BMC Racing Team (2015 season) | Continuum Sports LLC | United States | Shimano | BMC |
| TCG | Cannondale–Garmin (2015 season) | Slipstream Sports, LLC | United States | Shimano | Cannondale |
| EQS | Etixx–Quick-Step (2015 season) | Esperanza bvba | Belgium | Shimano | Specialized |
| FDJ | FDJ (2015 season) | Société de Gestion de L'Echappée | France | Shimano | Lapierre |
| TGA | Team Giant–Alpecin (2015 season) | SMS Cycling B.V. | Germany | Shimano | Giant |
| IAM | IAM Cycling (2015 season) | | Switzerland | Shimano | Scott |
| KAT | Team Katusha (2015 season) | Katusha Management SA | Russia | Shimano | Canyon |
| LAM | Lampre–Merida (2015 season) | CGS Cycling Team AG | Italy | Shimano | Merida |
| LTS | Lotto–Soudal (2015 season) | Belgian Cycling Company sa | Belgium | Campagnolo | Ridley |
| TLJ | LottoNL–Jumbo (2015 season) | Rabo Wielerploegen | Netherlands | Shimano | Bianchi |
| MOV | Movistar Team (2015 season) | Abarca Sports S.L. | Spain | Campagnolo | Canyon |
| OGE | Orica–GreenEDGE (2015 season) | GreenEdge Cycling | Australia | Shimano | Scott |
| SKY | Team Sky (2015 season) | Tour Racing Limited | Great Britain | Shimano | Pinarello |
| TCS | Tinkoff–Saxo (2015 season) | Tinkoff Sport | Russia | Shimano | Specialized |
| TFR | Trek Factory Racing (2015 season) | Trek Bicycle Corporation | United States | Shimano | Trek |

== Riders ==
=== AG2R La Mondiale ===
As of 1 January 2015

| Rider | Date of birth |
|---|---|
| Jan Bakelants (BEL) | 14 February 1986 (aged 28) |
| Romain Bardet (FRA) | 9 November 1990 (aged 24) |
| Julien Bérard (FRA) | 2 July 1987 (aged 27) |
| Carlos Betancur (COL) | 13 October 1989 (aged 25) |
| Guillaume Bonnafond (FRA) | 23 June 1987 (aged 27) |
| Mikaël Cherel (FRA) | 17 March 1986 (aged 28) |
| Maxime Daniel (FRA) | 5 June 1991 (aged 23) |
| Nico Denz (GER) | 15 February 1994 (aged 20) |
| Axel Domont (FRA) | 7 August 1990 (aged 24) |
| Samuel Dumoulin (FRA) | 20 August 1980 (aged 34) |
| Hubert Dupont (FRA) | 13 November 1980 (aged 34) |
| Ben Gastauer (LUX) | 14 November 1987 (aged 27) |
| Damien Gaudin (FRA) | 20 August 1986 (aged 28) |
| Alexis Gougeard (FRA) | 5 March 1993 (aged 21) |
| Patrick Gretsch (GER) | 7 April 1987 (aged 27) |
| Hugo Houle (CAN) | 27 September 1990 (aged 24) |

| Rider | Date of birth |
|---|---|
| Quentin Jaurégui (FRA) | 22 April 1994 (aged 20) |
| Blel Kadri (FRA) | 3 September 1986 (aged 28) |
| Pierre Latour (FRA) | 12 October 1993 (aged 21) |
| Julian Kern (GER) | 28 December 1989 (aged 25) |
| Sébastien Minard (FRA) | 12 June 1982 (aged 32) |
| Lloyd Mondory (FRA) | 26 April 1982 (aged 32) |
| Matteo Montaguti (ITA) | 6 January 1984 (aged 30) |
| Rinaldo Nocentini (ITA) | 25 September 1977 (aged 37) |
| Jean-Christophe Péraud (FRA) | 22 May 1977 (aged 37) |
| Domenico Pozzovivo (ITA) | 30 November 1982 (aged 32) |
| Christophe Riblon (FRA) | 17 January 1981 (aged 33) |
| Sébastien Turgot (FRA) | 11 April 1984 (aged 30) |
| Johan Vansummeren (BEL) | 4 February 1981 (aged 33) |
| Alexis Vuillermoz (FRA) | 1 June 1988 (aged 26) |

=== Astana ===
As of 1 January 2015

| Rider | Date of birth |
|---|---|
| Valerio Agnoli (ITA) | 6 January 1985 (aged 30) |
| Fabio Aru (ITA) | 3 July 1990 (aged 24) |
| Maxat Ayazbayev (KAZ) | 27 January 1992 (aged 22) |
| Lars Boom (NED) | 30 December 1985 (aged 29) |
| Borut Božič (SLO) | 8 August 1980 (aged 34) |
| Dario Cataldo (ITA) | 17 March 1985 (aged 29) |
| Laurens De Vreese (BEL) | 29 September 1988 (aged 26) |
| Alexsandr Dyachenko (KAZ) | 17 October 1983 (aged 31) |
| Daniil Fominykh (KAZ) | 28 August 1991 (aged 23) |
| Jakob Fuglsang (DEN) | 22 March 1985 (aged 29) |
| Dmitriy Gruzdev (KAZ) | 13 March 1986 (aged 29) |
| Andrea Guardini (ITA) | 12 June 1989 (aged 25) |
| Andriy Hrivko (UKR) | 7 August 1983 (aged 31) |
| Arman Kamyshev (KAZ) | 14 March 1991 (aged 24) |
| Tanel Kangert (EST) | 11 March 1987 (aged 27) |

| Rider | Date of birth |
|---|---|
| Bakhtiyar Kozhatayev (KAZ) | 28 March 1992 (aged 22) |
| Mikel Landa (ESP) | 13 December 1989 (aged 25) |
| Miguel Ángel López (COL) | 4 February 1994 (aged 20) |
| Alexey Lutsenko (KAZ) | 7 September 1992 (aged 22) |
| Davide Malacarne (ITA) | 11 June 1987 (aged 27) |
| Vincenzo Nibali (ITA) | 14 November 1984 (aged 30) |
| Diego Rosa (ITA) | 27 March 1989 (aged 25) |
| Luis León Sánchez (ESP) | 24 November 1983 (aged 31) |
| Michele Scarponi (ITA) | 25 September 1979 (aged 35) |
| Rein Taaramäe (EST) | 24 April 1987 (aged 27) |
| Paolo Tiralongo (ITA) | 8 July 1977 (aged 37) |
| Ruslan Tleubayev (KAZ) | 7 March 1987 (aged 27) |
| Alessandro Vanotti (ITA) | 16 September 1980 (aged 34) |
| Lieuwe Westra (NED) | 11 September 1982 (aged 32) |
| Andrey Zeits (KAZ) | 14 December 1986 (aged 28) |

=== BMC Racing Team ===
As of January 1, 2015

| Rider | Date of birth |
|---|---|
| Darwin Atapuma (COL) | January 15, 1988 (aged 26) |
| Brent Bookwalter (USA) | February 16, 1984 (aged 30) |
| Marcus Burghardt (GER) | June 30, 1983 (aged 31) |
| Damiano Caruso (ITA) | August 12, 1987 (aged 27) |
| Alessandro De Marchi (ITA) | May 19, 1986 (aged 28) |
| Rohan Dennis (AUS) | May 28, 1990 (aged 24) |
| Silvan Dillier (SUI) | August 3, 1990 (aged 24) |
| Jempy Drucker (LUX) | September 3, 1986 (aged 28) |
| Cadel Evans (Note: Evans retired from cycling on February 1.) (AUS) | February 14, 1977 (aged 37) |
| Campbell Flakemore (AUS) | August 6, 1992 (aged 22) |
| Philippe Gilbert (BEL) | July 5, 1982 (aged 32) |
| Ben Hermans (BEL) | June 8, 1986 (aged 28) |
| Stefan Küng (SUI) | November 16, 1993 (aged 21) |
| Klaas Lodewyck (BEL) | March 24, 1988 (aged 26) |
| Amaël Moinard (FRA) | February 2, 1982 (aged 32) |

| Rider | Date of birth |
|---|---|
| Daniel Oss (ITA) | January 13, 1987 (aged 27) |
| Taylor Phinney (USA) | June 27, 1990 (aged 24) |
| Manuel Quinziato (ITA) | October 30, 1979 (aged 35) |
| Joey Rosskopf (USA) | September 5, 1989 (aged 25) |
| Samuel Sánchez (ESP) | February 5, 1978 (aged 36) |
| Michael Schär (SUI) | September 29, 1986 (aged 28) |
| Manuel Senni (ITA) | March 11, 1992 (aged 22) |
| Peter Stetina (USA) | August 8, 1987 (aged 27) |
| Dylan Teuns (BEL) | March 1, 1992 (aged 22) |
| Greg Van Avermaet (BEL) | May 17, 1985 (aged 29) |
| Tejay van Garderen (USA) | August 12, 1988 (aged 26) |
| Peter Velits (SVK) | August 12, 1985 (aged 29) |
| Loïc Vliegen (Note: Vliegen joined the team on July 1.) (BEL) | December 20, 1993 (aged 21) |
| Danilo Wyss (SUI) | August 26, 1985 (aged 29) |
| Rick Zabel (GER) | December 7, 1993 (aged 21) |

=== Cannondale–Garmin ===
As of January 11, 2015

| Rider | Date of birth |
|---|---|
| Janier Acevedo (COL) | December 6, 1985 (aged 29) |
| Jack Bauer (NZL) | April 7, 1985 (aged 29) |
| Alberto Bettiol (ITA) | October 23, 1993 (aged 21) |
| Nate Brown (USA) | July 6, 1991 (aged 23) |
| André Cardoso (POR) | September 3, 1984 (aged 30) |
| Tom Danielson (USA) | March 13, 1978 (aged 36) |
| Joe Dombrowski (USA) | May 12, 1991 (aged 23) |
| Davide Formolo (ITA) | October 25, 1992 (aged 22) |
| Nathan Haas (AUS) | March 12, 1989 (aged 25) |
| Ryder Hesjedal (CAN) | December 9, 1980 (aged 34) |
| Alex Howes (USA) | January 1, 1988 (aged 27) |
| Ben King (USA) | March 22, 1989 (aged 25) |
| Ted King (USA) | January 31, 1983 (aged 31) |
| Kristijan Koren (SLO) | November 25, 1986 (aged 28) |

| Rider | Date of birth |
|---|---|
| Sebastian Langeveld (NED) | January 17, 1985 (aged 29) |
| Alan Marangoni (ITA) | July 16, 1984 (aged 30) |
| Dan Martin (IRE) | August 20, 1986 (aged 28) |
| Matej Mohorič (SLO) | October 19, 1994 (aged 20) |
| Moreno Moser (ITA) | December 25, 1990 (aged 24) |
| Ramūnas Navardauskas (LTU) | January 30, 1988 (aged 26) |
| Lasse Norman Hansen (DEN) | February 11, 1992 (aged 22) |
| Kristoffer Skjerping (NOR) | May 4, 1993 (aged 21) |
| Tom-Jelte Slagter (NED) | July 1, 1989 (aged 25) |
| Andrew Talansky (USA) | November 23, 1988 (aged 26) |
| Rigoberto Urán (COL) | January 26, 1987 (aged 27) |
| Dylan van Baarle (NED) | May 22, 1993 (aged 21) |
| Davide Villella (ITA) | June 27, 1991 (aged 23) |
| Ruben Zepuntke (GER) | January 29, 1993 (aged 21) |

=== Etixx–Quick-Step ===
As of 1 January 2015

| Rider | Date of birth |
|---|---|
| Julian Alaphilippe (FRA) | 11 June 1992 (aged 22) |
| Tom Boonen (BEL) | 15 October 1980 (aged 34) |
| Maxime Bouet (FRA) | 3 November 1986 (aged 28) |
| Gianluca Brambilla (ITA) | 22 August 1987 (aged 27) |
| Mark Cavendish (GBR) | 21 May 1985 (aged 29) |
| David de la Cruz (ESP) | 6 May 1989 (aged 25) |
| Michał Gołaś (POL) | 29 September 1984 (aged 30) |
| Iljo Keisse (BEL) | 21 December 1982 (aged 32) |
| Michał Kwiatkowski (POL) | 2 June 1990 (aged 24) |
| Yves Lampaert (BEL) | 10 April 1991 (aged 23) |
| Nikolas Maes (BEL) | 9 April 1986 (aged 28) |
| Tony Martin (GER) | 23 April 1985 (aged 29) |
| Gianni Meersman (BEL) | 5 December 1985 (aged 29) |
| Mark Renshaw (AUS) | 22 October 1982 (aged 32) |

| Rider | Date of birth |
|---|---|
| Fabio Sabatini (ITA) | 10 February 1985 (aged 29) |
| Pieter Serry (BEL) | 21 November 1988 (aged 26) |
| Zdeněk Štybar (CZE) | 11 December 1985 (aged 29) |
| Niki Terpstra (NED) | 18 May 1984 (aged 30) |
| Matteo Trentin (ITA) | 2 August 1989 (aged 25) |
| Rigoberto Urán (COL) | 26 January 1987 (aged 27) |
| Petr Vakoč (CZE) | 11 July 1992 (aged 22) |
| Guillaume Van Keirsbulck (BEL) | 14 February 1991 (aged 23) |
| Stijn Vandenbergh (BEL) | 25 April 1984 (aged 30) |
| Martin Velits (SVK) | 21 February 1985 (aged 29) |
| Julien Vermote (BEL) | 26 July 1989 (aged 25) |
| Carlos Verona (ESP) | 4 November 1992 (aged 22) |
| Łukasz Wiśniowski (POL) | 7 December 1991 (aged 23) |

=== FDJ ===
As of 1 January 2015

| Rider | Date of birth |
|---|---|
| William Bonnet (FRA) | 25 June 1982 (aged 32) |
| David Boucher (BEL) | 17 March 1980 (aged 34) |
| Sébastien Chavanel (FRA) | 21 March 1983 (aged 31) |
| Arnaud Courteille (FRA) | 13 March 1989 (aged 25) |
| Mickaël Delage (FRA) | 6 August 1985 (aged 29) |
| Arnaud Démare (FRA) | 26 August 1991 (aged 23) |
| Kenny Elissonde (FRA) | 22 July 1991 (aged 23) |
| Murilo Fischer (BRA) | 16 June 1979 (aged 35) |
| Alexandre Geniez (FRA) | 16 April 1988 (aged 26) |
| Anthony Geslin (FRA) | 9 June 1980 (aged 34) |
| Arnold Jeannesson (FRA) | 15 January 1986 (aged 28) |
| Mathieu Ladagnous (FRA) | 12 December 1984 (aged 30) |
| Johan Le Bon (FRA) | 3 October 1990 (aged 24) |
| Olivier Le Gac (FRA) | 27 August 1993 (aged 21) |
| Pierre-Henri Lecuisinier (FRA) | 30 June 1993 (aged 21) |

| Rider | Date of birth |
|---|---|
| Lorrenzo Manzin (FRA) | 26 July 1994 (aged 20) |
| Steve Morabito (SUI) | 30 January 1983 (aged 31) |
| Francis Mourey (FRA) | 8 December 1980 (aged 34) |
| Yoann Offredo (FRA) | 12 November 1986 (aged 28) |
| Laurent Pichon (FRA) | 19 July 1986 (aged 28) |
| Cédric Pineau (FRA) | 8 May 1985 (aged 29) |
| Thibaut Pinot (FRA) | 29 May 1990 (aged 24) |
| Kévin Reza (FRA) | 18 May 1988 (aged 26) |
| Anthony Roux (FRA) | 18 April 1987 (aged 27) |
| Jérémy Roy (FRA) | 22 June 1983 (aged 31) |
| Marc Sarreau (FRA) | 10 June 1993 (aged 21) |
| Benoît Vaugrenard (FRA) | 5 January 1982 (aged 32) |
| Jussi Veikkanen (FIN) | 29 March 1981 (aged 33) |
| Arthur Vichot (FRA) | 26 November 1988 (aged 26) |

=== Team Giant–Alpecin ===
As of 1 January 2015

| Rider | Date of birth |
|---|---|
| Nikias Arndt (GER) | 18 November 1991 (aged 23) |
| Bert De Backer (BEL) | 2 April 1984 (aged 30) |
| Warren Barguil (FRA) | 28 October 1991 (aged 23) |
| Lawson Craddock (USA) | 20 March 1992 (aged 22) |
| Roy Curvers (NED) | 27 December 1979 (aged 35) |
| John Degenkolb (GER) | 7 January 1989 (aged 25) |
| Tom Dumoulin (NED) | 11 November 1990 (aged 24) |
| Caleb Fairly (USA) | 19 February 1987 (aged 27) |
| Johannes Fröhlinger (GER) | 9 June 1985 (aged 29) |
| Simon Geschke (GER) | 13 March 1986 (aged 28) |
| Lars van der Haar (NED) | 23 July 1991 (aged 23) |
| Chad Haga (USA) | 26 August 1988 (aged 26) |
| Thierry Hupond (FRA) | 10 November 1984 (aged 30) |
| Ji Cheng (CHN) | 15 July 1987 (aged 27) |

| Rider | Date of birth |
|---|---|
| Carter Jones (USA) | 27 February 1989 (aged 25) |
| Marcel Kittel (GER) | 11 May 1988 (aged 26) |
| Koen de Kort (NED) | 8 September 1982 (aged 32) |
| Fredrik Ludvigsson (SWE) | 28 April 1994 (aged 20) |
| Tobias Ludvigsson (SWE) | 22 February 1991 (aged 23) |
| Luka Mezgec (SLO) | 27 June 1988 (aged 26) |
| Daan Olivier (Note: Olivier retired from cycling in June.) (NED) | 24 November 1992 (aged 22) |
| Georg Preidler (AUT) | 17 June 1990 (aged 24) |
| Ramon Sinkeldam (NED) | 9 February 1989 (aged 25) |
| Tom Stamsnijder (NED) | 15 May 1985 (aged 29) |
| Albert Timmer (NED) | 13 June 1985 (aged 29) |
| Tom Veelers (NED) | 14 September 1984 (aged 30) |
| Zico Waeytens (BEL) | 29 September 1991 (aged 23) |

=== IAM Cycling ===
As of 1 January 2015

| Rider | Date of birth |
|---|---|
| Marcel Aregger (SUI) | 26 August 1990 (aged 24) |
| Matthias Brändle (AUT) | 7 December 1989 (aged 25) |
| Sylvain Chavanel (FRA) | 30 June 1979 (aged 35) |
| Clément Chevrier (FRA) | 29 June 1992 (aged 22) |
| Stef Clement (NED) | 24 September 1982 (aged 32) |
| Jérôme Coppel (FRA) | 6 August 1986 (aged 28) |
| Thomas Degand (BEL) | 13 May 1986 (aged 28) |
| Stefan Denifl (AUT) | 20 September 1987 (aged 27) |
| Dries Devenyns (BEL) | 22 July 1983 (aged 31) |
| Martin Elmiger (SUI) | 23 September 1978 (aged 36) |
| Sondre Holst Enger (NOR) | 17 December 1993 (aged 21) |
| Mathias Frank (SUI) | 9 December 1986 (aged 28) |
| Jonathan Fumeaux (SUI) | 7 March 1988 (aged 26) |
| Heinrich Haussler (AUS) | 25 February 1984 (aged 30) |
| Reto Hollenstein (SUI) | 22 August 1985 (aged 29) |

| Rider | Date of birth |
|---|---|
| Roger Kluge (GER) | 5 February 1986 (aged 28) |
| Pirmin Lang (SUI) | 25 November 1984 (aged 30) |
| Jarlinson Pantano (COL) | 19 November 1988 (aged 26) |
| Simon Pellaud (SUI) | 6 November 1992 (aged 22) |
| Matteo Pelucchi (ITA) | 21 January 1989 (aged 25) |
| Jérôme Pineau (FRA) | 2 January 1980 (aged 34) |
| Sébastien Reichenbach (SUI) | 28 May 1989 (aged 25) |
| Vicente Reynés (ESP) | 30 July 1981 (aged 33) |
| Aleksejs Saramotins (LAT) | 8 April 1982 (aged 32) |
| Patrick Schelling (SUI) | 1 May 1990 (aged 24) |
| David Tanner (AUS) | 30 September 1984 (aged 30) |
| Jonas van Genechten (BEL) | 16 September 1986 (aged 28) |
| Larry Warbasse (USA) | 28 June 1990 (aged 24) |
| Marcel Wyss (SUI) | 25 June 1986 (aged 28) |

=== Lampre–Merida ===
As of 1 January 2015

| Rider | Date of birth |
|---|---|
| Niccolò Bonifazio (ITA) | 29 October 1993 (aged 21) |
| Matteo Bono (ITA) | 11 November 1983 (aged 31) |
| Mattia Cattaneo (ITA) | 25 October 1990 (aged 24) |
| Davide Cimolai (ITA) | 13 August 1989 (aged 25) |
| Valerio Conti (ITA) | 30 March 1993 (aged 21) |
| Mário Costa (POR) | 15 November 1985 (aged 29) |
| Rui Costa (POR) | 5 October 1986 (aged 28) |
| Kristijan Đurasek (CRO) | 26 July 1987 (aged 27) |
| Chun Kai Feng (TWN) | 2 November 1988 (aged 26) |
| Roberto Ferrari (ITA) | 9 March 1983 (aged 31) |
| Tsgabu Grmay (ETH) | 25 August 1991 (aged 23) |
| Ilia Koshevoy (BLR) | 20 March 1991 (aged 23) |
| Sacha Modolo (ITA) | 19 June 1987 (aged 27) |

| Rider | Date of birth |
|---|---|
| Manuele Mori (ITA) | 9 August 1980 (aged 34) |
| Przemysław Niemiec (POL) | 11 April 1980 (aged 34) |
| Nelson Oliveira (POR) | 6 March 1989 (aged 25) |
| Luka Pibernik (SLO) | 23 November 1993 (aged 21) |
| Rubén Plaza (ESP) | 29 December 1980 (aged 34) |
| Jan Polanc (SLO) | 6 May 1992 (aged 22) |
| Filippo Pozzato (ITA) | 10 September 1981 (aged 33) |
| Maximiliano Richeze (ARG) | 7 March 1983 (aged 30) |
| José Serpa (COL) | 17 April 1979 (aged 35) |
| Diego Ulissi (ITA) | 15 July 1989 (aged 25) |
| Rafael Valls (ESP) | 27 June 1987 (aged 27) |
| Xu Gang (CHN) | 28 January 1984 (aged 30) |

=== LottoNL–Jumbo ===
As of 1 January 2015

| Rider | Date of birth |
|---|---|
| George Bennett (NZL) | 7 April 1990 (aged 24) |
| Brian Bulgaç (NED) | 7 April 1988 (aged 26) |
| Rick Flens (NED) | 11 April 1983 (aged 31) |
| Robert Gesink (NED) | 31 May 1986 (aged 28) |
| Marc Goos (NED) | 30 November 1990 (aged 24) |
| Moreno Hofland (NED) | 31 August 1991 (aged 23) |
| Martijn Keizer (NED) | 25 March 1988 (aged 26) |
| Wilco Kelderman (NED) | 25 March 1991 (aged 23) |
| Steven Kruijswijk (NED) | 7 June 1987 (aged 27) |
| Tom Leezer (NED) | 26 December 1985 (aged 29) |
| Bert-Jan Lindeman (NED) | 16 June 1989 (aged 25) |
| Barry Markus (NED) | 17 July 1991 (aged 23) |
| Paul Martens (GER) | 26 October 1983 (aged 31) |

| Rider | Date of birth |
|---|---|
| Timo Roosen (NED) | 11 January 1993 (aged 21) |
| Bram Tankink (NED) | 3 December 1978 (aged 36) |
| Laurens ten Dam (NED) | 13 November 1980 (aged 34) |
| Mike Teunissen (NED) | 25 August 1992 (aged 22) |
| Maarten Tjallingii (NED) | 5 November 1977 (aged 37) |
| Tom Van Asbroeck (BEL) | 19 April 1990 (aged 24) |
| Nick van der Lijke (NED) | 23 September 1991 (aged 23) |
| Jos van Emden (NED) | 27 June 1985 (aged 29) |
| Sep Vanmarcke (BEL) | 28 July 1988 (aged 26) |
| Robert Wagner (GER) | 17 April 1983 (aged 31) |
| Maarten Wynants (BEL) | 13 May 1982 (aged 32) |

=== Lotto–Soudal ===
As of 1 January 2015

| Rider | Date of birth |
|---|---|
| Sander Armée (BEL) | 10 December 1985 (aged 29) |
| Lars Bak (DEN) | 16 January 1980 (aged 34) |
| Tiesj Benoot (BEL) | 11 March 1994 (aged 20) |
| Kris Boeckmans (BEL) | 13 February 1987 (aged 27) |
| Vegard Breen (NOR) | 8 February 1990 (aged 24) |
| Stig Broeckx (BEL) | 10 May 1990 (aged 24) |
| Sean De Bie (BEL) | 3 October 1991 (aged 23) |
| Jasper De Buyst (BEL) | 24 November 1993 (aged 21) |
| Bart De Clercq (BEL) | 26 August 1986 (aged 28) |
| Thomas De Gendt (BEL) | 6 November 1986 (aged 28) |
| Jens Debusschere (BEL) | 28 August 1989 (aged 25) |
| Kenny Dehaes (BEL) | 10 November 1984 (aged 30) |
| Gert Dockx (BEL) | 4 July 1988 (aged 26) |
| Tony Gallopin (FRA) | 19 April 1988 (aged 26) |

| Rider | Date of birth |
|---|---|
| André Greipel (GER) | 16 July 1982 (aged 32) |
| Adam Hansen (AUS) | 11 May 1981 (aged 33) |
| Greg Henderson (NZL) | 10 September 1976 (aged 38) |
| Pim Ligthart (NED) | 16 June 1988 (aged 26) |
| Maxime Monfort (BEL) | 14 January 1983 (aged 31) |
| Jürgen Roelandts (BEL) | 2 July 1985 (aged 29) |
| Marcel Sieberg (GER) | 30 April 1982 (aged 32) |
| Boris Vallée (BEL) | 3 June 1993 (aged 21) |
| Jurgen Van den Broeck (BEL) | 1 February 1983 (aged 31) |
| Tosh Van der Sande (BEL) | 28 November 1990 (aged 24) |
| Dennis Vanendert (BEL) | 27 June 1988 (aged 26) |
| Jelle Vanendert (BEL) | 19 February 1985 (aged 29) |
| Louis Vervaeke (BEL) | 6 November 1993 (aged 21) |
| Tim Wellens (BEL) | 10 May 1991 (aged 23) |

=== Movistar Team ===
As of 1 January 2015

| Rider | Date of birth |
|---|---|
| Andrey Amador (CRC) | 29 August 1986 (aged 28) |
| Winner Anacona (COL) | 11 September 1988 (aged 26) |
| Igor Antón (ESP) | 2 March 1983 (aged 31) |
| Eros Capecchi (ITA) | 13 June 1986 (aged 28) |
| Jonathan Castroviejo (ESP) | 27 April 1987 (aged 27) |
| Alex Dowsett (GBR) | 3 October 1988 (aged 26) |
| Imanol Erviti (ESP) | 15 November 1983 (aged 31) |
| Rubén Fernández (ESP) | 1 March 1991 (aged 23) |
| John Gadret (FRA) | 22 April 1979 (aged 35) |
| Jesús Herrada (ESP) | 26 July 1990 (aged 24) |
| José Herrada (ESP) | 1 October 1985 (aged 29) |
| Beñat Intxausti (ESP) | 20 March 1986 (aged 28) |
| Gorka Izagirre (ESP) | 7 October 1987 (aged 27) |
| Ion Izagirre (ESP) | 4 February 1989 (aged 25) |

| Rider | Date of birth |
|---|---|
| Pablo Lastras (ESP) | 20 January 1976 (aged 38) |
| Juan José Lobato (ESP) | 28 December 1988 (aged 26) |
| Adriano Malori (ITA) | 28 January 1988 (aged 26) |
| Javier Moreno (ESP) | 18 July 1984 (aged 30) |
| Dayer Quintana (COL) | 10 August 1992 (aged 22) |
| Nairo Quintana (COL) | 4 February 1990 (aged 24) |
| José Joaquín Rojas (ESP) | 8 June 1985 (aged 29) |
| Enrique Sanz (ESP) | 11 September 1989 (aged 25) |
| Marc Soler (ESP) | 22 November 1993 (aged 21) |
| Rory Sutherland (AUS) | 8 February 1982 (aged 32) |
| Jasha Sütterlin (GER) | 4 November 1992 (aged 22) |
| Alejandro Valverde (ESP) | 25 April 1980 (aged 34) |
| Francisco Ventoso (ESP) | 6 May 1982 (aged 32) |
| Giovanni Visconti (ITA) | 13 January 1983 (aged 31) |

=== Orica–GreenEDGE ===
As of 1 January 2015

| Rider | Date of birth |
|---|---|
| Michael Albasini (SUI) | 20 December 1980 (aged 34) |
| Sam Bewley (NZL) | 22 July 1987 (aged 27) |
| Adam Blythe (GBR) | 1 October 1989 (aged 25) |
| Esteban Chaves (COL) | 17 January 1990 (aged 24) |
| Simon Clarke (AUS) | 18 July 1986 (aged 28) |
| Magnus Cort (DEN) | 16 January 1993 (aged 21) |
| Mitchell Docker (AUS) | 2 October 1986 (aged 28) |
| Luke Durbridge (AUS) | 9 April 1991 (aged 23) |
| Caleb Ewan (AUS) | 11 July 1994 (aged 20) |
| Simon Gerrans (AUS) | 16 May 1980 (aged 34) |
| Jack Haig (Note: Haig joined the team as a stagiaire on August 1.) (AUS) | 6 September 1993 (aged 21) |
| Mathew Hayman (AUS) | 20 April 1978 (aged 36) |
| Michael Hepburn (AUS) | 17 August 1991 (aged 23) |
| Leigh Howard (AUS) | 18 October 1989 (aged 25) |

| Rider | Date of birth |
|---|---|
| Damien Howson (AUS) | 13 August 1992 (aged 22) |
| Daryl Impey (RSA) | 6 December 1984 (aged 30) |
| Jens Keukeleire (BEL) | 23 November 1988 (aged 26) |
| Brett Lancaster (AUS) | 15 November 1979 (aged 35) |
| Michael Matthews (AUS) | 26 September 1990 (aged 24) |
| Christian Meier (CAN) | 2 September 1985 (aged 29) |
| Cameron Meyer (AUS) | 11 January 1988 (aged 26) |
| Jens Mouris (NED) | 12 March 1980 (aged 34) |
| Ivan Santaromita (ITA) | 30 April 1984 (aged 30) |
| Svein Tuft (CAN) | 19 May 1977 (aged 37) |
| Pieter Weening (NED) | 5 April 1981 (aged 33) |
| Adam Yates (GBR) | 7 August 1992 (aged 22) |
| Simon Yates (GBR) | 7 August 1992 (aged 22) |

=== Team Katusha ===
As of 1 January 2015

| Rider | Date of birth |
|---|---|
| Maxim Belkov (RUS) | 9 January 1985 (aged 29) |
| Sven Erik Bystrøm (NOR) | 21 January 1992 (aged 22) |
| Giampaolo Caruso (ITA) | 15 August 1980 (aged 34) |
| Sergey Chernetskiy (RUS) | 9 April 1990 (aged 24) |
| Jacopo Guarnieri (ITA) | 14 August 1987 (aged 27) |
| Marco Haller (AUT) | 1 April 1991 (aged 23) |
| Vladimir Isaichev (RUS) | 26 April 1986 (aged 28) |
| Pavel Kochetkov (RUS) | 7 March 1986 (aged 28) |
| Alexandr Kolobnev (RUS) | 4 May 1981 (aged 33) |
| Dmitry Kozonchuk (RUS) | 5 April 1984 (aged 30) |
| Alexander Kristoff (NOR) | 5 July 1987 (aged 27) |
| Vyacheslav Kuznetsov (RUS) | 24 June 1989 (aged 25) |
| Sergey Lagutin (RUS) | 14 January 1981 (aged 33) |
| Alberto Losada (ESP) | 28 February 1982 (aged 32) |
| Tiago Machado (POR) | 18 October 1985 (aged 29) |

| Rider | Date of birth |
|---|---|
| Daniel Moreno (ESP) | 5 September 1981 (aged 33) |
| Luca Paolini (ITA) | 17 January 1977 (aged 37) |
| Alexander Porsev (RUS) | 21 February 1986 (aged 28) |
| Joaquim Rodríguez (ESP) | 12 May 1979 (aged 35) |
| Rüdiger Selig (GER) | 19 February 1989 (aged 25) |
| Egor Silin (RUS) | 25 June 1988 (aged 26) |
| Gatis Smukulis (LAT) | 15 April 1987 (aged 27) |
| Simon Špilak (SLO) | 23 June 1986 (aged 28) |
| Yuri Trofimov (RUS) | 26 January 1984 (aged 30) |
| Alexey Tsatevich (RUS) | 5 July 1989 (aged 25) |
| Ángel Vicioso (ESP) | 13 April 1977 (aged 37) |
| Eduard Vorganov (RUS) | 1 December 1982 (aged 32) |
| Anton Vorobyev (RUS) | 12 October 1990 (aged 24) |
| Ilnur Zakarin (RUS) | 15 September 1989 (aged 25) |

=== Team Sky ===
As of 19 August 2015

| Rider | Date of birth |
|---|---|
| Ian Boswell (USA) | 7 February 1991 (aged 24) |
| Philip Deignan (IRL) | 7 September 1983 (aged 31) |
| Nathan Earle (AUS) | 4 June 1988 (aged 27) |
| Bernhard Eisel (AUT) | 17 February 1981 (aged 34) |
| Andrew Fenn (GBR) | 1 July 1990 (aged 25) |
| Chris Froome (GBR) | 20 May 1985 (aged 30) |
| Tao Geoghegan Hart (Note: Geoghegan Hart joined the team on 1 August as a stagiaire, from Axeon Cycling Team) (GBR) | 30 March 1995 (aged 20) |
| Sebastián Henao (COL) | 5 August 1993 (aged 22) |
| Sergio Henao (COL) | 10 December 1987 (aged 27) |
| Peter Kennaugh (GBR) | 15 June 1989 (aged 26) |
| Vasil Kiryienka (BLR) | 28 June 1981 (aged 34) |
| Christian Knees (GER) | 5 March 1981 (aged 34) |
| Leopold König (CZE) | 15 November 1987 (aged 27) |
| David López (ESP) | 13 May 1981 (aged 34) |
| Mikel Nieve (ESP) | 26 May 1984 (aged 31) |
| Lars Petter Nordhaug (NOR) | 14 May 1984 (aged 31) |

| Rider | Date of birth |
|---|---|
| Danny Pate (USA) | 23 March 1979 (aged 36) |
| Alex Peters (Note: Peters joined the team on 1 August as a stagiaire, from SEG Racing) (GBR) | 31 March 1994 (aged 21) |
| Wout Poels (NED) | 1 October 1987 (aged 27) |
| Richie Porte (AUS) | 30 January 1985 (aged 30) |
| Salvatore Puccio (ITA) | 31 August 1989 (aged 25) |
| Nicolas Roche (IRL) | 3 July 1984 (aged 31) |
| Luke Rowe (GBR) | 10 March 1990 (aged 25) |
| Kanstantsin Sivtsov (BLR) | 9 August 1982 (aged 32) |
| Ian Stannard (GBR) | 25 May 1987 (aged 28) |
| Chris Sutton (AUS) | 10 September 1984 (aged 30) |
| Ben Swift (GBR) | 5 November 1987 (aged 27) |
| Geraint Thomas (GBR) | 25 May 1986 (aged 29) |
| Bradley Wiggins (Note: Wiggins left the team to join the new WIGGINS squad after the 2015 Paris–Roubaix in April.) (GBR) | 28 April 1980 (aged 35) |
| Elia Viviani (ITA) | 7 February 1989 (aged 26) |
| Xabier Zandio (ESP) | 17 March 1977 (aged 38) |

=== Tinkoff–Saxo ===
As of 1 January 2015

| Rider | Date of birth |
|---|---|
| Ivan Basso (ITA) | 26 November 1977 (aged 37) |
| Edward Beltrán (COL) | 18 January 1990 (aged 24) |
| Daniele Bennati (ITA) | 24 September 1980 (aged 34) |
| Manuele Boaro (ITA) | 3 December 1987 (aged 27) |
| Maciej Bodnar (POL) | 7 March 1985 (aged 29) |
| Matti Breschel (DEN) | 31 August 1984 (aged 30) |
| Pavel Brutt (RUS) | 29 January 1982 (aged 32) |
| Alberto Contador (ESP) | 6 December 1982 (aged 32) |
| Jesper Hansen (DEN) | 23 October 1990 (aged 24) |
| Jesús Hernández (ESP) | 28 September 1981 (aged 33) |
| Christopher Juul-Jensen (DEN) | 6 July 1989 (aged 25) |
| Robert Kišerlovski (CRO) | 9 August 1986 (aged 28) |
| Michael Kolář (SVK) | 21 December 1992 (aged 22) |
| Roman Kreuziger (CZE) | 6 May 1986 (aged 28) |
| Rafał Majka (POL) | 12 September 1989 (aged 25) |

| Rider | Date of birth |
|---|---|
| Jay McCarthy (AUS) | 8 September 1992 (aged 22) |
| Michael Mørkøv (DEN) | 30 April 1985 (aged 29) |
| Sérgio Paulinho (POR) | 26 March 1980 (aged 34) |
| Evgeni Petrov (RUS) | 25 May 1978 (aged 36) |
| Bruno Pires (POR) | 15 May 1981 (aged 33) |
| Paweł Poljański (POL) | 6 May 1990 (aged 24) |
| Michael Rogers (AUS) | 20 December 1979 (aged 35) |
| Ivan Rovny (RUS) | 30 September 1987 (aged 27) |
| Juraj Sagan (SVK) | 23 December 1988 (aged 26) |
| Peter Sagan (SVK) | 26 January 1990 (aged 24) |
| Chris Anker Sørensen (DEN) | 5 September 1984 (aged 30) |
| Matteo Tosatto (ITA) | 14 May 1974 (aged 40) |
| Nikolay Trusov (RUS) | 2 July 1985 (aged 29) |
| Michael Valgren (DEN) | 7 February 1992 (aged 22) |
| Oliver Zaugg (SUI) | 9 May 1981 (aged 33) |

=== Trek Factory Racing ===
As of 29 March 2015

| Rider | Date of birth |
|---|---|
| Eugenio Alafaci (ITA) | August 9, 1990 (aged 24) |
| Julián Arredondo (COL) | July 30, 1988 (aged 26) |
| Fumiyuki Beppu (JPN) | April 10, 1983 (aged 31) |
| Matthew Busche (USA) | May 9, 1985 (aged 29) |
| Fabian Cancellara (SUI) | March 18, 1981 (aged 34) |
| Marco Coledan (ITA) | August 22, 1988 (aged 26) |
| Stijn Devolder (BEL) | August 29, 1979 (aged 35) |
| Laurent Didier (LUX) | July 19, 1984 (aged 30) |
| Fabio Felline (ITA) | March 29, 1990 (aged 25) |
| Markel Irizar (ESP) | February 5, 1980 (aged 35) |
| Bob Jungels (LUX) | September 22, 1992 (aged 22) |
| Daniel McConnell (AUS) | August 9, 1985 (aged 29) |
| Bauke Mollema (NED) | November 26, 1986 (aged 28) |
| Giacomo Nizzolo (ITA) | January 30, 1989 (aged 26) |
| Yaroslav Popovych (UKR) | January 4, 1980 (aged 35) |

| Rider | Date of birth |
|---|---|
| Grégory Rast (SUI) | January 17, 1980 (aged 35) |
| Hayden Roulston (NZL) | January 10, 1981 (aged 34) |
| Fränk Schleck (LUX) | April 15, 1980 (aged 34) |
| Jesse Sergent (NZL) | July 8, 1988 (aged 26) |
| Fábio Silvestre (POR) | January 25, 1990 (aged 25) |
| Gert Steegmans (BEL) | September 30, 1980 (aged 34) |
| Jasper Stuyven (BEL) | April 17, 1992 (aged 22) |
| Danny van Poppel (NED) | July 26, 1993 (aged 21) |
| Boy van Poppel (NED) | January 18, 1988 (aged 27) |
| Kristof Vandewalle (BEL) | April 5, 1985 (aged 29) |
| Calvin Watson (AUS) | January 6, 1993 (aged 22) |
| Riccardo Zoidl (AUT) | April 8, 1988 (aged 26) |
| Haimar Zubeldia (ESP) | April 1, 1977 (aged 37) |

== See also ==
- 2015 in men's road cycling
- List of 2015 UCI Professional Continental and Continental teams
- List of 2015 UCI Women's Teams

| Preceded by 2014 | List of UCI WorldTeams and riders 2015 | Succeeded by 2016 |
