= 2015 Astana season =

Cycling team season

Astana
- 2015 season
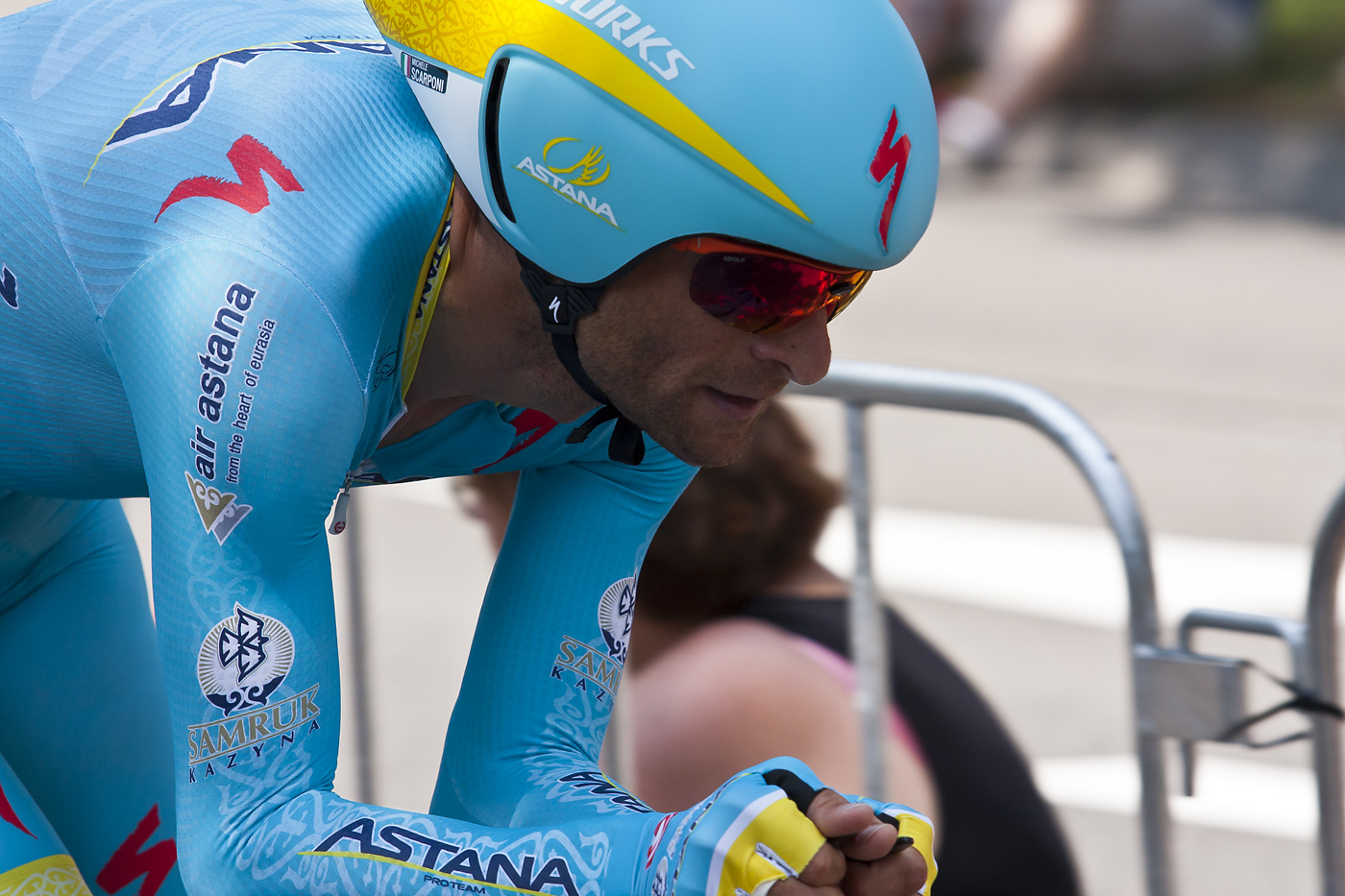
- Michele Scarponi in first stage of Tour de France
- UCI code: AST
- Status: UCI ProTeam
- World Tour Rank: 5th
- Chairman: Alexander Vinokourov
- Main sponsor(s): Samruk-Kazyna
- Based: Kazakhstan
- Bicycles: Specialized
- Groupset: Campagnolo

Season victories
- One-day races: 6
- Stage race overall: 3
- Stage race stages: 22
- Grand Tours: 1
- National Championships: 2

The 2015 season for the Astana cycling team began in January with the Tour Down Under. As a UCI WorldTeam, they were automatically invited and obligated to send a squad to every event in the UCI World Tour.

== Team roster ==
As of 1 January 2015

Rider	Date of birth
Valerio Agnoli (ITA)	6 January 1985 (aged 30)
Fabio Aru (ITA)	3 July 1990 (aged 24)
Maxat Ayazbayev (KAZ)	27 January 1992 (aged 22)
Lars Boom (NED)	30 December 1985 (aged 29)
Borut Božič (SLO)	8 August 1980 (aged 34)
Dario Cataldo (ITA)	17 March 1985 (aged 29)
Laurens De Vreese (BEL)	29 September 1988 (aged 26)
Alexsandr Dyachenko (KAZ)	17 October 1983 (aged 31)
Daniil Fominykh (KAZ)	28 August 1991 (aged 23)
Jakob Fuglsang (DEN)	22 March 1985 (aged 29)
Dmitriy Gruzdev (KAZ)	13 March 1986 (aged 29)
Andrea Guardini (ITA)	12 June 1989 (aged 25)
Andriy Hrivko (UKR)	7 August 1983 (aged 31)
Arman Kamyshev (KAZ)	14 March 1991 (aged 24)
Tanel Kangert (EST)	11 March 1987 (aged 27)

Rider	Date of birth
Bakhtiyar Kozhatayev (KAZ)	28 March 1992 (aged 22)
Mikel Landa (ESP)	13 December 1989 (aged 25)
Miguel Ángel López (COL)	4 February 1994 (aged 20)
Alexey Lutsenko (KAZ)	7 September 1992 (aged 22)
Davide Malacarne (ITA)	11 June 1987 (aged 27)
Vincenzo Nibali (ITA)	14 November 1984 (aged 30)
Diego Rosa (ITA)	27 March 1989 (aged 25)
Luis León Sánchez (ESP)	24 November 1983 (aged 31)
Michele Scarponi (ITA)	25 September 1979 (aged 35)
Rein Taaramäe (EST)	24 April 1987 (aged 27)
Paolo Tiralongo (ITA)	8 July 1977 (aged 37)
Ruslan Tleubayev (KAZ)	7 March 1987 (aged 27)
Alessandro Vanotti (ITA)	16 September 1980 (aged 34)
Lieuwe Westra (NED)	11 September 1982 (aged 32)
Andrey Zeits (KAZ)	14 December 1986 (aged 28)

Riders who joined the team for the 2015 season

Rider	2014 team
Maxat Ayazbayev	Astana continental team
Lars Boom	Belkin Pro Cycling
Dario Cataldo	Team Sky
Laurens De Vreese	Wanty–Groupe Gobert
Bakhtiyar Kozhatayev	Astana continental team
Miguel Ángel López	neo (Loteria Boyaca Indeportes)
Davide Malacarne	Team Europcar
Diego Rosa	Androni Giocattoli–Venezuela
Luis León Sánchez	Caja Rural–Seguros RGA
Rein Taaramäe	Cofidis

Riders who left the team during or after the 2014 season

Rider	2015 team
Janez Brajkovič	UnitedHealthcare
Enrico Gasparotto	Wanty–Groupe Gobert
Francesco Gavazzi	Southeast Pro Cycling
Jacopo Guarnieri	Team Katusha
Evan Huffman	Team SmartStop
Maxim Iglinsky	Fired (doping)
Valentin Iglinsky	Fired (doping)
Fredrik Kessiakoff	Retired
Dimitry Muravyev	Retired

== Season victories ==
Date	Race	Competition	Rider	Country	Location
14 February	Vuelta a Murcia	UCI Europe Tour	Rein Taaramäe (EST)	Spain	Castle of Lorca
17 February	Tour of Oman, Stage 1	UCI Asia Tour	Andrea Guardini (ITA)	Oman	Al Wutayyah
22 February	Tour of Oman, Points classification	UCI Asia Tour	Andrea Guardini (ITA)	Oman	
8 March	Tour de Langkawi, Stage 1	UCI Asia Tour	Andrea Guardini (ITA)	Malaysia	Langkawi
9 March	Tour de Langkawi, Stage 2	UCI Asia Tour	Andrea Guardini (ITA)	Malaysia	Sungai Petani
11 March	Tour de Langkawi, Stage 4	UCI Asia Tour	Andrea Guardini (ITA)	Malaysia	Kuala Berang
15 March	Tour de Langkawi, Stage 8	UCI Asia Tour	Andrea Guardini (ITA)	Malaysia	Kuala Lumpur
10 April	Tour of the Basque Country, Stage 5	UCI World Tour	Mikel Landa (ESP)	Spain	Aia
24 April	Giro del Trentino, Stage 4	UCI Europe Tour	Paolo Tiralongo (ITA)	Italy	Cles
24 April	Giro del Trentino, Teams classification	UCI Europe Tour	(Note: The riders on the squad were Dario Cataldo, Tanel Kangert, Mikel Landa, Davide Malacarne, Diego Rosa, Paolo Tiralongo and Andrey Zeits)	Italy	
16 May	Tour de Picardie, Stage 2	UCI Europe Tour	Andrea Guardini (ITA)	France	Fleurines
17 May	Giro d'Italia, Stage 9	UCI World Tour	Paolo Tiralongo (ITA)	Italy	San Giorgio del Sannio
17 May	Tour de Picardie, Teams classification	UCI Europe Tour	(Note: The riders on the squad were Andrea Guardini, Borut Božič, Maxat Ayazbayev, Laurens De Vreese, Arman Kamyshev, Bakhtiyar Kozhatayev and Ruslan Tleubayev)	France	
23 May	World Ports Classic, Stage 1	UCI Europe Tour	Andrea Guardini (ITA)	Belgium	Antwerp
24 May	Giro d'Italia, Stage 15	UCI World Tour	Mikel Landa (ESP)	Italy	Madonna di Campiglio
26 May	Giro d'Italia, Stage 16	UCI World Tour	Mikel Landa (ESP)	Italy	Aprica
29 May	Giro d'Italia, Stage 19	UCI World Tour	Fabio Aru (ITA)	Italy	Cervinia
30 May	Giro d'Italia, Stage 20	UCI World Tour	Fabio Aru (ITA)	Italy	Sestriere
31 May	Giro d'Italia, Young rider classification	UCI World Tour	Fabio Aru (ITA)	Italy	
31 May	Giro d'Italia, Teams classification	UCI World Tour	(Note: The riders on the squad were Fabio Aru, Dario Cataldo, Tanel Kangert, Mikel Landa, Davide Malacarne, Diego Rosa, Luis León Sánchez, Paolo Tiralongo and Andrey Zeits)	Italy	
31 May	Giro d'Italia, Team points classification	UCI World Tour		Italy	
31 May	Giro d'Italia, Azzurri d'Italia classification	UCI World Tour	Mikel Landa (ESP)	Italy	
31 May	Giro d'Italia, Premio Energy classification	UCI World Tour	Fabio Aru (ITA)	Italy	
20 June	Tour de Suisse, Stage 8	UCI World Tour	Alexey Lutsenko (KAZ)	Switzerland	Bern
24 July	Tour de France, Stage 19	UCI World Tour	Vincenzo Nibali (ITA)	France	La Toussuire – Les Sybelles
4 August	Danmark Rundt, Stage 1	UCI Europe Tour	Lars Boom (NED)	Denmark	Holstebro
5 August	Vuelta a Burgos, Stage 2	UCI Europe Tour	Team time trial (Note: The riders on the squad were Mikel Landa, Luis León Sánchez, Miguel Ángel López, Bakhtiyar Kozhatayev, Davide Malacarne, Michele Scarponi, Rein Taaramäe and Alessandro Vanotti)	Spain	Burgos
7 August	Vuelta a Burgos, Stage 4	UCI Europe Tour	Miguel Ángel López (COL)	Spain	Pineda de la Sierra
8 August	Vuelta a Burgos, Overall	UCI Europe Tour	Rein Taaramäe (EST)	Spain	
8 August	Vuelta a Burgos, Young rider classification	UCI Europe Tour	Miguel Ángel López (COL)	Spain	
8 August	Vuelta a Burgos, Teams classification	UCI Europe Tour		Spain	
16 August	Arctic Race of Norway, Overall	UCI Europe Tour	Rein Taaramäe (EST)	Norway	
2 September	Vuelta a España, Stage 11	UCI World Tour	Mikel Landa (ESP)	Spain	Cortals d'Encamp
13 September	Vuelta a España, Overall	UCI World Tour	Fabio Aru (ITA)	Spain	
17 September	Coppa Bernocchi	UCI Europe Tour	Vincenzo Nibali (ITA)	Italy	Legnano
30 September	Tre Valli Varesine	UCI Europe Tour	Vincenzo Nibali (ITA)	Italy	Varese
1 October	Milano–Torino	UCI Europe Tour	Diego Rosa (ITA)	Italy	Turin
4 October	Tour of Almaty	UCI Asia Tour	Alexey Lutsenko (KAZ)	Kazakhstan	Almaty
4 October	Il Lombardia	UCI World Tour	Vincenzo Nibali (ITA)	Italy	Como
8 October	Abu Dhabi Tour, Stage 1	UCI Asia Tour	Andrea Guardini (ITA)	United Arab Emirates	Madinat Zayed
27 October	Tour of Hainan, Stage 8	UCI Asia Tour	Andrey Zeits (KAZ)	China	Wuzhishan
28 October	Tour of Hainan, Teams classification	UCI Asia Tour	(Note: The riders on the squad were Valerio Agnoli, Daniil Fominykh, Dmitriy Gruzdev, Arman Kamyshev, Bakhtiyar Kozhatayev, Ruslan Tleubayev and Andrey Zeits)	China	

== National, Continental and World champions 2015 ==
Date	Discipline	Jersey	Rider	Country	Location
21 June	European Games Road Race Champion		Luis León Sánchez (ESP)	Azerbaijan	Baku
25 June	Kazakhstan National Time Trial Champion		Alexey Lutsenko (KAZ)	Kazakhstan	Petropavl
27 June	Italian National Road Race Champion		Vincenzo Nibali (ITA)	Italy	Superga
