= 2015 Team Katusha season =

Team Katusha
- 2015 season
- UCI code: KAT
- Status: UCI ProTeam
- Manager: Vyacheslav Ekimov
- Main sponsor(s): Gazprom & Itera & Rostec
- Based: Russia
- Bicycles: Canyon
- Groupset: Shimano

Season victories
- One-day races: 6
- Stage race overall: 5
- Stage race stages: 26
- National Championships: 3

The 2015 season for Team Katusha began in January at the Tour de San Luis. As a UCI WorldTeam, they were automatically invited and obligated to send a squad to every event in the UCI World Tour.

== Team roster ==
As of 1 January 2015

| Rider | Date of birth |
|---|---|
| Maxim Belkov (RUS) | 9 January 1985 (aged 29) |
| Sven Erik Bystrøm (NOR) | 21 January 1992 (aged 22) |
| Giampaolo Caruso (ITA) | 15 August 1980 (aged 34) |
| Sergey Chernetskiy (RUS) | 9 April 1990 (aged 24) |
| Jacopo Guarnieri (ITA) | 14 August 1987 (aged 27) |
| Marco Haller (AUT) | 1 April 1991 (aged 23) |
| Vladimir Isaichev (RUS) | 26 April 1986 (aged 28) |
| Pavel Kochetkov (RUS) | 7 March 1986 (aged 28) |
| Alexandr Kolobnev (RUS) | 4 May 1981 (aged 33) |
| Dmitry Kozonchuk (RUS) | 5 April 1984 (aged 30) |
| Alexander Kristoff (NOR) | 5 July 1987 (aged 27) |
| Vyacheslav Kuznetsov (RUS) | 24 June 1989 (aged 25) |
| Sergey Lagutin (RUS) | 14 January 1981 (aged 33) |
| Alberto Losada (ESP) | 28 February 1982 (aged 32) |
| Tiago Machado (POR) | 18 October 1985 (aged 29) |

| Rider | Date of birth |
|---|---|
| Daniel Moreno (ESP) | 5 September 1981 (aged 33) |
| Luca Paolini (ITA) | 17 January 1977 (aged 37) |
| Alexander Porsev (RUS) | 21 February 1986 (aged 28) |
| Joaquim Rodríguez (ESP) | 12 May 1979 (aged 35) |
| Rüdiger Selig (GER) | 19 February 1989 (aged 25) |
| Egor Silin (RUS) | 25 June 1988 (aged 26) |
| Gatis Smukulis (LAT) | 15 April 1987 (aged 27) |
| Simon Špilak (SLO) | 23 June 1986 (aged 28) |
| Yuri Trofimov (RUS) | 26 January 1984 (aged 30) |
| Alexey Tsatevich (RUS) | 5 July 1989 (aged 25) |
| Ángel Vicioso (ESP) | 13 April 1977 (aged 37) |
| Eduard Vorganov (RUS) | 1 December 1982 (aged 32) |
| Anton Vorobyev (RUS) | 12 October 1990 (aged 24) |
| Ilnur Zakarin (RUS) | 15 September 1989 (aged 25) |

Riders who joined the team for the 2015 season

| Rider | 2014 team |
|---|---|
| Sven Erik Bystrøm | neo-pro (Team Øster Hus-Ridley) |
| Jacopo Guarnieri | Astana |
| Sergey Lagutin | RusVelo |
| Tiago Machado | NetApp–Endura |
| Ilnur Zakarin | RusVelo |

Riders who left the team during or after the 2014 season

| Rider | 2015 team |
|---|---|
| Pavel Brutt | Tinkoff–Saxo |
| Vladimir Gusev | Skydive Dubai–Al Ahli |
| Petr Ignatenko | RusVelo |
| Mikhail Ignatiev | |
| Aleksandr Kuschynski | Minsk |
| Alexander Rybakov | RusVelo |

== Season victories ==
| Date | Race | Competition | Rider | Country | Location |
|---|---|---|---|---|---|
| 9 February | Tour of Qatar, Stage 2 | UCI Asia Tour | Alexander Kristoff (NOR) | Qatar | Al Khor Corniche |
| 11 February | Tour of Qatar, Stage 4 | UCI Asia Tour | Alexander Kristoff (NOR) | Qatar | Mesaieed |
| 12 February | Tour of Qatar, Stage 5 | UCI Asia Tour | Alexander Kristoff (NOR) | Qatar | Madinat ash Shamal |
| 13 February | Tour of Qatar, Points classification | UCI Asia Tour | Alexander Kristoff (NOR) | Qatar | |
| 19 February | Tour of Oman, Stage 3 | UCI Asia Tour | Alexander Kristoff (NOR) | Oman | Al-Musannah Sports City |
| 22 February | Volta ao Algarve, Portuguese rider classification | UCI Europe Tour | Tiago Machado (POR) | Portugal | |
| 22 February | Volta ao Algarve, Teams classification | UCI Europe Tour | (Note: The riders on the squad were Sergey Chernetskiy, Yuri Trofimov, Rüdiger Selig, Alberto Losada, Tiago Machado, Alexander Porsev, Anton Vorobyev and Alexandr Kolobnev) | Portugal | |
| 6 March | Driedaagse van West-Vlaanderen, Prologue | UCI Europe Tour | Anton Vorobyev (RUS) | Belgium | Middelkerke |
| 9 March | Paris–Nice, Stage 1 | UCI World Tour | Alexander Kristoff (NOR) | France | Contres |
| 28 March | Volta a Catalunya, Stage 6 | UCI World Tour | Sergey Chernetskiy (RUS) | Spain | PortAventura |
| 29 March | Gent–Wevelgem | UCI World Tour | Luca Paolini (ITA) | Belgium | Wevelgem |
| 31 March | Three Days of De Panne, Stage 1 | UCI Europe Tour | Alexander Kristoff (NOR) | Belgium | Zottegem |
| 1 April | Three Days of De Panne, Stage 2 | UCI Europe Tour | Alexander Kristoff (NOR) | Belgium | Koksijde |
| 2 April | Three Days of De Panne, Stage 3a | UCI Europe Tour | Alexander Kristoff (NOR) | Belgium | De Panne |
| 2 April | Three Days of De Panne, Overall | UCI Europe Tour | Alexander Kristoff (NOR) | Belgium | |
| 2 April | Three Days of De Panne, Points classification | UCI Europe Tour | Alexander Kristoff (NOR) | Belgium | |
| 4 April | GP Miguel Induráin | UCI Europe Tour | Ángel Vicioso (ESP) | Spain | Estella |
| 5 April | Tour of Flanders | UCI World Tour | Alexander Kristoff (NOR) | Belgium | Oudenaarde |
| 8 April | Scheldeprijs | UCI Europe Tour | Alexander Kristoff (NOR) | Belgium | Schoten |
| 8 April | Tour of the Basque Country, Stage 3 | UCI World Tour | Joaquim Rodríguez (ESP) | Spain | Zumarraga |
| 9 April | Tour of the Basque Country, Stage 4 | UCI World Tour | Joaquim Rodríguez (ESP) | Spain | Arrate |
| 10 April | Circuit de la Sarthe, Young rider classification | UCI Europe Tour | Sven Erik Bystrøm (NOR) | France | |
| 11 April | Tour of the Basque Country, Overall | UCI World Tour | Joaquim Rodríguez (ESP) | Spain | |
| 11 April | Tour of the Basque Country, Points classification | UCI World Tour | Joaquim Rodríguez (ESP) | Spain | |
| 11 April | Tour of the Basque Country, Teams classification | UCI World Tour | (Note: The riders on the squad were Joaquim Rodríguez, Simon Špilak, Daniel Moreno, Alexandr Kolobnev, Maxim Belkov, Sergey Lagutin, Ángel Vicioso and Ilnur Zakarin) | Spain | |
| 3 May | Tour de Romandie, Overall | UCI World Tour | Ilnur Zakarin (RUS) | Switzerland | |
| 3 May | Tour de Romandie, Mountains classification | UCI World Tour | Maxim Belkov (RUS) | Switzerland | |
| 3 May | Tour de Romandie, Sprints classification | UCI World Tour | Maxim Belkov (RUS) | Switzerland | |
| 3 May | Tour de Romandie, Teams classification | UCI World Tour | (Note: The riders on the squad were Simon Špilak, Maxim Belkov, Sergey Chernetskiy, Pavel Kochetkov, Egor Silin, Yuri Trofimov, Anton Vorobyev and Ilnur Zakarin) | Switzerland | |
| 20 May | Giro d'Italia, Stage 11 | UCI World Tour | Ilnur Zakarin (RUS) | Italy | Imola Circuit |
| 20 May | Tour of Norway, Stage 1 | UCI Europe Tour | Alexander Kristoff (NOR) | Norway | Sarpsborg |
| 21 May | Tour of Norway, Stage 2 | UCI Europe Tour | Alexander Kristoff (NOR) | Norway | Langesund |
| 24 May | Tour of Norway, Points classification | UCI Europe Tour | Alexander Kristoff (NOR) | Norway | |
| 27 May | Tour des Fjords, Stage 1 | UCI Europe Tour | Alexander Kristoff (NOR) | Norway | Norheimsund |
| 28 May | Tour des Fjords, Stage 2 | UCI Europe Tour | Alexander Kristoff (NOR) | Norway | Haugesund |
| 29 May | Tour des Fjords, Stage 3 | UCI Europe Tour | Alexander Kristoff (NOR) | Norway | Sauda |
| 31 May | Tour des Fjords, Overall | UCI Europe Tour | Marco Haller (AUT) | Norway | |
| 31 May | Tour des Fjords, Young rider classification | UCI Europe Tour | Marco Haller (AUT) | Norway | |
| 31 May | Tour des Fjords, Points classification | UCI Europe Tour | Alexander Kristoff (NOR) | Norway | |
| 11 June | Grand Prix of Aargau Canton | UCI Europe Tour | Alexander Kristoff (NOR) | Switzerland | Gippingen |
| 19 June | Tour de Suisse, Stage 7 | UCI World Tour | Alexander Kristoff (NOR) | Switzerland | Düdingen |
| 21 June | Tour de Suisse, Overall | UCI World Tour | Simon Špilak (SVN) | Switzerland | |
| 4 July | Tour of Austria, Prologue | UCI Europe Tour | Team time trial (Note: The riders on the squad were Sven Erik Bystrøm, Vladimir Isaichev, Daniel Moreno, Rüdiger Selig, Egor Silin, Gatis Smukulis, Ángel Vicioso and Eduard Vorganov) | Austria | Vienna |
| 6 July | Tour de France, Stage 3 | UCI World Tour | Joaquim Rodríguez (ESP) | Belgium | Mur de Huy |
| 16 July | Tour de France, Stage 12 | UCI World Tour | Joaquim Rodríguez (ESP) | France | Plateau de Beille |
| 6 August | Vuelta a Burgos, Stage 3 | UCI Europe Tour | Vladimir Isaichev (RUS) | Spain | Villadiego |
| 8 August | Vuelta a Burgos, Stage 5 | UCI Europe Tour | Daniel Moreno (ESP) | Spain | Lagunas de Neila |
| 8 August | Vuelta a Burgos, Points classification | UCI Europe Tour | Daniel Moreno (ESP) | Spain | |
| 13 August | Arctic Race of Norway, Stage 1 | UCI Europe Tour | Alexander Kristoff (NOR) | Norway | Harstad |
| 16 August | Arctic Race of Norway, Points classification | UCI Europe Tour | Alexander Kristoff (NOR) | Norway | |
| 30 August | GP Ouest–France | UCI World Tour | Alexander Kristoff (NOR) | France | Plouay |
| 6 September | Vuelta a España, Stage 15 | UCI World Tour | Joaquim Rodríguez (ESP) | Spain | Sotres |

== National, Continental and World champions 2015 ==
| Date | Discipline | Jersey | Rider | Country | Location |
|---|---|---|---|---|---|
| 26 June | Latvian National Time Trial Champion | | Gatis Smukulis (LAT) | Latvia | Dobele |
| 28 June | Austrian National Road Race Champion | | Marco Haller (AUT) | Austria | Güssing |
| 28 June | Russian National Road Race Champion | | Yuri Trofimov (RUS) | Russia | Saransk |
