= 2015 Vuelta a Murcia =

2015 UCI Europe Tour

Race details
- Dates: 14 February 2015
- Stages: 1
- Distance: 198.1 km (123.1 mi)
- Winning time: 5h 11' 38"

Results
	Winner	Rein Taaramäe (EST)	(Astana)
	Second	Bauke Mollema (NED)	(Trek Factory Racing)
	Third	Zdeněk Štybar (CZE)	(Etixx–Quick-Step)

The 2015 Vuelta a Murcia was the 31st professional edition of the Vuelta a Murcia cycle race and was held on 14 February 2015. The race started in Mazarrón and finished at the Castle of Lorca. The race was won by Rein Taaramäe.

== Teams ==
Twenty-one teams competed in the 2015 Vuelta a Murcia. These included seven UCI WorldTeams, nine UCI Professional Continental, four UCI Continental teams and a Spanish national team.

The teams that participated in the race were:

- ActiveJet
- Astana
- Bora–Argon 18
- Burgos BH
- Caja Rural–Seguros RGA
- CCC–Sprandi–Polkowice
- Cofidis
- Etixx–Quick-Step
- Team Europcar
- FDJ
- Team Frøy–Bianchi
- Team Giant–Alpecin
- Team Katusha
- Movistar Team
- Murias Taldea
- Team Novo Nordisk
- RusVelo
- Spain
- Topsport Vlaanderen–Baloise
- Trek Factory Racing
- UnitedHealthcare

== Result ==
Final general classification

Rank	Rider	Team	Time
1	Rein Taaramäe (EST)	Astana	5h 11' 38"
2	Bauke Mollema (NED)	Trek Factory Racing	+ 10"
3	Zdeněk Štybar (CZE)	Etixx–Quick-Step	+ 10"
4	Fabio Felline (ITA)	Trek Factory Racing	+ 10"
5	Luis León Sánchez (ESP)	Astana	+ 10"
6	Maciej Paterski (POL)	CCC–Sprandi–Polkowice	+ 10"
7	Tiago Machado (POR)	Team Katusha	+ 10"
8	Arthur Vichot (FRA)	FDJ	+ 10"
9	Floris De Tier (BEL)	Topsport Vlaanderen–Baloise	+ 10"
10	Marco Canola (ITA)	UnitedHealthcare	+ 10"
