= 2015 AG2R La Mondiale season =

AG2R La Mondiale
- 2015 season
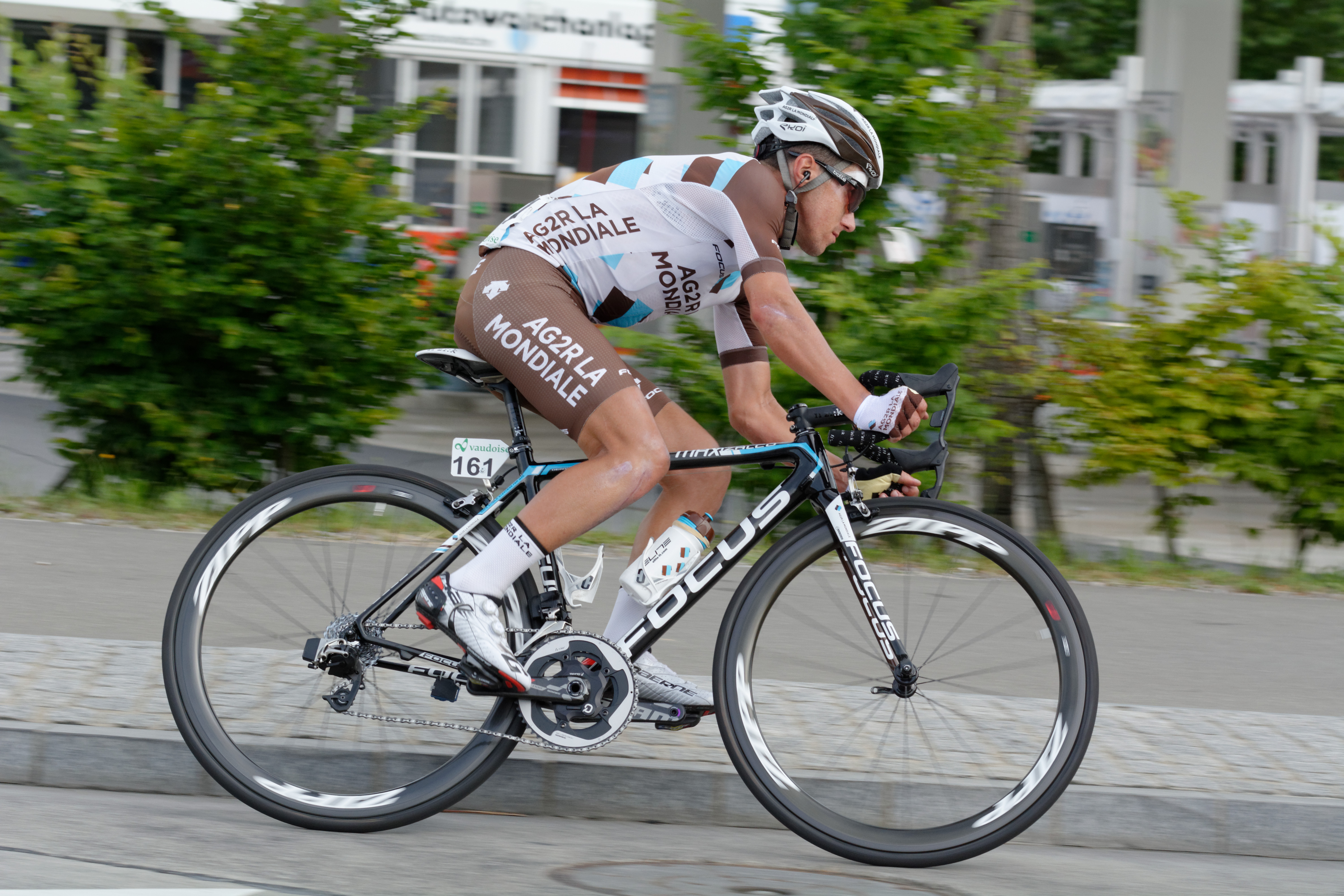
- Domenico Pozzovivo on 2015 Tour de Suisse
- UCI code: ALM
- Status: UCI ProTeam
- Manager: Vincent Lavenu
- Main sponsor(s): AG2R Group & La Mondiale Group
- Based: France
- Bicycles: Focus Bikes
- Groupset: SRAM

Season victories
- One-day races: 6
- Stage race overall: 3
- Stage race stages: 12
- National Championships: 1

The 2015 season for the AG2R La Mondiale cycling team began in January at the Tour de San Luis. As a UCI WorldTeam, they were automatically invited and obligated to send a squad to every event in the UCI World Tour.

== Team roster ==
As of 1 January 2015

Rider	Date of birth
Jan Bakelants (BEL)	14 February 1986 (aged 28)
Romain Bardet (FRA)	9 November 1990 (aged 24)
Julien Bérard (FRA)	2 July 1987 (aged 27)
Carlos Betancur (COL)	13 October 1989 (aged 25)
Guillaume Bonnafond (FRA)	23 June 1987 (aged 27)
Mikaël Cherel (FRA)	17 March 1986 (aged 28)
Maxime Daniel (FRA)	5 June 1991 (aged 23)
Nico Denz (GER)	15 February 1994 (aged 20)
Axel Domont (FRA)	7 August 1990 (aged 24)
Samuel Dumoulin (FRA)	20 August 1980 (aged 34)
Hubert Dupont (FRA)	13 November 1980 (aged 34)
Ben Gastauer (LUX)	14 November 1987 (aged 27)
Damien Gaudin (FRA)	20 August 1986 (aged 28)
Alexis Gougeard (FRA)	5 March 1993 (aged 21)
Patrick Gretsch (GER)	7 April 1987 (aged 27)
Hugo Houle (CAN)	27 September 1990 (aged 24)

Rider	Date of birth
Quentin Jaurégui (FRA)	22 April 1994 (aged 20)
Blel Kadri (FRA)	3 September 1986 (aged 28)
Pierre Latour (FRA)	12 October 1993 (aged 21)
Julian Kern (GER)	28 December 1989 (aged 25)
Sébastien Minard (FRA)	12 June 1982 (aged 32)
Lloyd Mondory (FRA)	26 April 1982 (aged 32)
Matteo Montaguti (ITA)	6 January 1984 (aged 30)
Rinaldo Nocentini (ITA)	25 September 1977 (aged 37)
Jean-Christophe Péraud (FRA)	22 May 1977 (aged 37)
Domenico Pozzovivo (ITA)	30 November 1982 (aged 32)
Christophe Riblon (FRA)	17 January 1981 (aged 33)
Sébastien Turgot (FRA)	11 April 1984 (aged 30)
Johan Vansummeren (BEL)	4 February 1981 (aged 33)
Alexis Vuillermoz (FRA)	1 June 1988 (aged 26)

Riders who joined the team for the 2015 season

Rider	2014 team
Jan Bakelants	Omega Pharma–Quick-Step
Nico Denz	neo-pro (Chambéry Formation)
Quentin Jaurégui	neo-pro (Roubaix-Lille Métropole)
Pierre-Roger Latour	neo-pro (Chambéry Formation)
Johan Vansummeren	Garmin–Sharp

Riders who left the team during or after the 2014 season

Rider	2015 team
Davide Appollonio	Androni Giocattoli
Maxime Bouet	Etixx–Quick-Step
Steve Chainel	Cofidis
Yauheni Hutarovich	Bretagne–Séché Environnement
Julian Kern	Retired

== Season victories ==
Date	Race	Competition	Rider	Country	Location
8 February	Étoile de Bessèges, Young rider classification	UCI Europe Tour	Alexis Gougeard (FRA)	France	
21 February	Tour du Haut Var, Stage 1	UCI Europe Tour	Ben Gastauer (LUX)	France	Seillans
22 February	Tour du Haut Var, Overall	UCI Europe Tour	Ben Gastauer (LUX)	France	
1 March	La Drôme Classic	UCI Europe Tour	Samuel Dumoulin (FRA)	France	Livron-sur-Drôme
21 March	Classic Loire Atlantique	UCI Europe Tour	Alexis Gougeard (FRA)	France	La Haie-Fouassière
25 March	Volta a Catalunya, Stage 3	UCI World Tour	Domenico Pozzovivo (ITA)	Spain	Girona
29 March	Critérium International, Stage 3	UCI Europe Tour	Jean-Christophe Péraud (FRA)	France	L'Ospedale
29 March	Critérium International, Overall	UCI Europe Tour	Jean-Christophe Péraud (FRA)	France	
29 March	Critérium International, Teams classification	UCI Europe Tour	(Note: The riders on the squad were Jean-Christophe Péraud, Jan Bakelants, Julien Bérard, Patrick Gretsch, Christophe Riblon and Alexis Vuillermoz)	France	
23 April	Giro del Trentino, Stage 3	UCI Europe Tour	Domenico Pozzovivo (ITA)	Italy	Fierozzo Val dei Mòcheni
3 May	Grand Prix de la Somme	UCI Europe Tour	Quentin Jaurégui (FRA)	France	Amiens
8 May	Four Days of Dunkirk, Stage 3	UCI Europe Tour	Alexis Gougeard (FRA)	France	Saint-Omer
30 May	Grand Prix de Plumelec-Morbihan	UCI Europe Tour	Alexis Vuillermoz (FRA)	France	Plumelec
11 June	Critérium du Dauphiné, Stage 5	UCI World Tour	Romain Bardet (FRA)	France	Pra-Loup
21 June	Route du Sud, Young rider classification	UCI Europe Tour	Pierre Latour (FRA)	France	
11 July	Tour de France, Stage 8	UCI World Tour	Alexis Vuillermoz (FRA)	France	Mûr-de-Bretagne
23 July	Tour de France, Stage 18	UCI World Tour	Romain Bardet (FRA)	France	Saint-Jean-de-Maurienne
26 July	Tour de France, Super-combativity award	UCI World Tour	Romain Bardet (FRA)	France	
15 August	Tour de l'Ain, Stage 4	UCI Europe Tour	Pierre Latour (FRA)	France	Lélex
11 September	Vuelta a España, Stage 19	UCI World Tour	Alexis Gougeard (FRA)	Spain	Ávila
27 September	Tour du Gévaudan Languedoc-Roussillon, Stage 2	UCI Europe Tour	Alexis Vuillermoz (FRA)	France	Mende
30 September	Tour de l'Eurométropole, Prologue	UCI Europe Tour	Alexis Gougeard (FRA)	Belgium	Mont-Saint-Aubert
2 October	Gran Piemonte	UCI Europe Tour	Jan Bakelants (BEL)	Italy	Cirié
4 October	Tour de l'Eurométropole, Overall	UCI Europe Tour	Alexis Gougeard (FRA)	Belgium	
4 October	Tour de l'Eurométropole, Young rider classification	UCI Europe Tour	Alexis Gougeard (FRA)	Belgium	
10 October	Giro dell'Emilia	UCI Europe Tour	Jan Bakelants (BEL)	Italy	San Luca

== National, Continental and World champions 2015 ==
Date	Discipline	Jersey	Rider	Country	Location
25 June	Canadian National Time Trial Champion		Hugo Houle (CAN)	Canada	Saint-Georges
22 July	Pan American Games Time Trial Champion		Hugo Houle (CAN)	Canada	Toronto
