= 2015 IAM Cycling season =

IAM Cycling
- 2015 season
- UCI code: IAM
- Status: UCI ProTeam
- Manager: Serge Beucherie
- Main sponsor(s): IAM Independent Asset Management
- Based: Switzerland
- Bicycles: Scott
- Groupset: Shimano

Season victories
- One-day races: 2
- Stage race overall: —
- Stage race stages: 9
- National Championships: 3
- Most wins: Matteo Pelucchi and Matthias Brändle (2 wins)

The 2015 season for the IAM Cycling cycling team began in January at the Tour Down Under. As a UCI WorldTeam, they were automatically invited and obligated to send a squad to every event in the UCI World Tour.

In December 2014 the UCI announced that the team would be granted a WorldTour licence for the 2015 season.

== Team roster ==
As of 1 January 2015

Rider	Date of birth
Marcel Aregger (SUI)	26 August 1990 (aged 24)
Matthias Brändle (AUT)	7 December 1989 (aged 25)
Sylvain Chavanel (FRA)	30 June 1979 (aged 35)
Clément Chevrier (FRA)	29 June 1992 (aged 22)
Stef Clement (NED)	24 September 1982 (aged 32)
Jérôme Coppel (FRA)	6 August 1986 (aged 28)
Thomas Degand (BEL)	13 May 1986 (aged 28)
Stefan Denifl (AUT)	20 September 1987 (aged 27)
Dries Devenyns (BEL)	22 July 1983 (aged 31)
Martin Elmiger (SUI)	23 September 1978 (aged 36)
Sondre Holst Enger (NOR)	17 December 1993 (aged 21)
Mathias Frank (SUI)	9 December 1986 (aged 28)
Jonathan Fumeaux (SUI)	7 March 1988 (aged 26)
Heinrich Haussler (AUS)	25 February 1984 (aged 30)
Reto Hollenstein (SUI)	22 August 1985 (aged 29)

Rider	Date of birth
Roger Kluge (GER)	5 February 1986 (aged 28)
Pirmin Lang (SUI)	25 November 1984 (aged 30)
Jarlinson Pantano (COL)	19 November 1988 (aged 26)
Simon Pellaud (SUI)	6 November 1992 (aged 22)
Matteo Pelucchi (ITA)	21 January 1989 (aged 25)
Jérôme Pineau (FRA)	2 January 1980 (aged 34)
Sébastien Reichenbach (SUI)	28 May 1989 (aged 25)
Vicente Reynés (ESP)	30 July 1981 (aged 33)
Aleksejs Saramotins (LAT)	8 April 1982 (aged 32)
Patrick Schelling (SUI)	1 May 1990 (aged 24)
David Tanner (AUS)	30 September 1984 (aged 30)
Jonas van Genechten (BEL)	16 September 1986 (aged 28)
Larry Warbasse (USA)	28 June 1990 (aged 24)
Marcel Wyss (SUI)	25 June 1986 (aged 28)

Riders who joined the team for the 2015 season

Rider	2014 team
Clément Chevrier	neo-pro (Bissell Development)
Stef Clement	Belkin Pro Cycling
Jérôme Coppel	Cofidis
Thomas Degand	Wanty–Groupe Gobert
Dries Devenyns	Giant–Shimano
Sondre Holst Enger	neo-pro (Sparebanken Sør)
Jarlinson Pantano	Colombia
Simon Pellaud	neo-pro (Roth-Felt)
David Tanner	Belkin Pro Cycling
Jonas Vangenechten	Lotto–Belisol
Larry Warbasse	BMC Racing Team

Riders who left the team during or after the 2014 season

Rider	2015 team
Kristof Goddaert	†18.02.14
Sébastien Hinault	Retired
Kevyn Ista	Wallonie-Bruxelles
Dominic Klemme	
Gustav Larsson	Cult Energy Pro Cycling
Thomas Löfkvist	Retired
Johann Tschopp	IAM MTB Team

== Season victories ==
Date	Race	Competition	Rider	Country	Location
29 January	Trofeo Santanyi-Ses Salines-Campos	UCI Europe Tour	Matteo Pelucchi (ITA)	Spain	Campos
1 February	Trofeo Playa de Palma	UCI Europe Tour	Matteo Pelucchi (ITA)	Spain	Palma de Mallorca
22 February	Tour of Oman, Stage 6	UCI Asia Tour	Matthias Brändle (AUT)	Oman	Muttrah Promenade
27 May	Tour of Belgium, Prologue	UCI Europe Tour	Matthias Brändle (AUT)	Belgium	Bornem
17 June	Ster ZLM Toer, Prologue	UCI Europe Tour	Roger Kluge (GER)	Netherlands	Goes
5 July	Tour of Austria, Stage 1	UCI Europe Tour	Sondre Holst Enger (NOR)	Austria	Scheibbs
6 July	Tour of Austria, Stage 2	UCI Europe Tour	David Tanner (AUS)	Austria	Grieskirchen
28 July	Tour de Wallonie, Stage 4	UCI Europe Tour	Jonas van Genechten (BEL)	Belgium	Quaregnon
3 August	Tour de Pologne, Stage 2	UCI World Tour	Matteo Pelucchi (ITA)	Poland	Dąbrowa Górnicza
4 August	Tour de Pologne, Stage 3	UCI World Tour	Matteo Pelucchi (ITA)	Poland	Katowice
2 October	Tour de l'Eurométropole, Stage 2	UCI Europe Tour	Jonas van Genechten (BEL)	Belgium	Poperinge
4 October	Tour de l'Eurométropole, Teams classification	UCI Europe Tour	(Note: The riders on the squad were Matthias Brändle, Dries Devenyns, Heinrich Haussler, Reto Hollenstein, Sondre Holst Enger, Simon Pellaud, Aleksejs Saramotins and Jonas van Genechten)	Belgium	

=== Victory originally obtained by Denifl but vacated ===
Date	Race	Competition	Country	Location
21 June	Tour de Suisse, Mountains classification	UCI World Tour	Switzerland	

== National, Continental and World champions 2015 ==
Date	Discipline	Jersey	Rider	Country	Location
11 January	Australian National Road Race Champion		Heinrich Haussler (AUS)	Australia	Buninyong
25 June	French National Time Trial Champion		Jérôme Coppel (FRA)	France	Chantonnay
28 June	Latvian National Road Race Champion		Aleksejs Saramotins (LAT)	Latvia	Dobele
