= 2015 Arctic Race of Norway =

2015 UCI Europe Tour

Race details
- Dates: 13–16 August
- Stages: 4
- Distance: 724 km (449.9 mi)
- Winning time: 16h 42' 02"

Results
Jersey awarded to the overall winner	Winner	Rein Taaramäe (EST)	(Astana)
	Second	Silvan Dillier (SUI)	(BMC Racing Team)
	Third	Ilnur Zakarin (RUS)	(Team Katusha)
Jersey awarded to the points classification winner	Points	Alexander Kristoff (NOR)	(Team Katusha)
Jersey awarded to the mountains classification winner	Mountains	August Jensen (NOR)	(Team Coop-Øster Hus)
Jersey awarded to the youth classification winner	Youth	Silvan Dillier (SUI)	(BMC Racing Team)
	Team	BMC Racing Team	

The 2015 Arctic Race of Norway was a four-stage cycling stage race that took place in Norway between 13 and 16 August. It was the third edition of the Arctic Race of Norway and is rated as a 2.HC event as part of the UCI Europe Tour. The race is the northernmost race in the 2015 men's cycling calendar. The champion of the 2014 edition was Steven Kruijswijk, though he was not present to defend his title.

The race was won by Rein Taaramäe (Astana) on the final stage, ahead of Silvan Dillier (BMC Racing Team) and Ilnur Zakarin (Team Katusha), after the three riders broke away from the pack on the finishing circuit. Alexander Kristoff (Team Katusha) won the first stage and the points classification, while the mountains classification was won by August Jensen (Team Coop-Øster Hus). BMC won the teams classification.

== Race schedule ==
List of stages
Stage	Date	Course	Distance	Type	Winner
1	13 August	Harstad to Harstad	213.5 km (133 mi)	Flat stage	Alexander Kristoff (NOR)
2	14 August	Evenskjer to Setermoen	162.5 km (101 mi)	Hilly stage	Sam Bennett (IRL)
3	15 August	Finnsnes (Senja) to Fjellandsby (Målselv)	183 km (114 mi)	Hilly stage	Ben Hermans (BEL)
4	16 August	Narvik to Narvik	165 km (103 mi)	Hilly stage	Silvan Dillier (SUI)

== Teams ==
22 teams were invited to take part in the race. Seven of these were UCI WorldTeams; 9 were UCI Professional Continental teams; five were UCI Continental teams. Each team entered six riders, so the peloton at the start of the race was made up of 126 riders.

UCI WorldTeams

- Team Katusha
- Team Giant–Alpecin
- BMC Racing Team
- Astana
- IAM Cycling
- Lampre–Merida
- Tinkoff–Saxo

UCI Professional Continental teams

- UnitedHealthcare
- Topsport Vlaanderen–Baloise
- Team Novo Nordisk
- Bora–Argon 18
- Bretagne–Séché Environnement
- Cofidis
- Team Europcar
- Cult Energy Pro Cycling
- MTN–Qhubeka

UCI Continental teams

- Team Joker
- Team Coop-Øster Hus
- Team Fixit.no
- Team Sparebanken Sør
- Team Ringeriks-Kraft
- Team Frøy-Bianchi

== Pre-race favourites ==
The principal stage in the general classification was expected to be the third stage, the summit finish in Målselv Municipality. This stage was expected to favour the climbers, such as Rein Taaramäe (Astana), Louis Meintjes (MTN–Qhubeka) and Ilnur Zakarin (Team Katusha), who were therefore the favourites for the overall victory. The other stages were expected to be won by sprinters. Two of the prominent sprinters in the race were the Norwegians Alexander Kristoff (Team Katusha) and Edvald Boasson Hagen (MTN–Qhubeka). Other sprinters present included Sam Bennett (Bora–Argon 18), Bryan Coquard (Team Europcar) and Niccolò Bonifazio and Davide Cimolai (both Lampre–Merida).

== Stages ==
=== Stage 1 ===
13 August 2015 – Harstad to Harstad, 210 km (130 mi)

Stage 1 result
Rank	Rider	Team	Time
1	Alexander Kristoff (NOR)	Team Katusha	4h 58' 36"
2	Edvald Boasson Hagen (NOR)	MTN–Qhubeka	+ 0"
3	Sam Bennett (IRL)	Bora–Argon 18	+ 0"
4	Niccolo Bonifazio (ITA)	Lampre–Merida	+ 0"
5	Michael Van Staeyen (BEL)	Cofidis	+ 0"
6	Rasmus Guldhammer (DEN)	Cult Energy Pro Cycling	+ 0"
7	Amaury Capiot (BEL)	Topsport Vlaanderen–Baloise	+ 0"
8	Martin Elmiger (SUI)	IAM Cycling	+ 0"
9	Anthony Turgis (FRA)	Cofidis	+ 0"
10	Sondre Holst Enger (NOR)	IAM Cycling	+ 0"
Source: ProCyclingStats

General classification after stage 1
Rank	Rider	Team	Time
1	Alexander Kristoff (NOR)	Team Katusha	4h 58' 26"
2	Edvald Boasson Hagen (NOR)	MTN–Qhubeka	+ 4"
3	Sam Bennett (IRL)	Bora–Argon 18	+ 6"
4	Niccolo Bonifazio (ITA)	Lampre–Merida	+ 10"
5	Michael Van Staeyen (BEL)	Cofidis	+ 10"
6	Rasmus Guldhammer (DEN)	Cult Energy Pro Cycling	+ 10"
7	Amaury Capiot (BEL)	Topsport Vlaanderen–Baloise	+ 10"
8	Martin Elmiger (SUI)	IAM Cycling	+ 10"
9	Anthony Turgis (FRA)	Cofidis	+ 10"
10	Sondre Holst Enger (NOR)	IAM Cycling	+ 10"
Source: ProCyclingStats

=== Stage 2 ===
14 August 2015 – Evenskjer to Setermoen, 155 km (96 mi)

Stage 2 result
Rank	Rider	Team	Time
1	Sam Bennett (IRL)	Bora–Argon 18	3h 41' 05"
2	Federico Zurlo (ITA)	UnitedHealthcare	+ 0"
3	Alexander Kristoff (NOR)	Team Katusha	+ 0"
4	Michael Kolář (SVK)	Tinkoff–Saxo	+ 0"
5	Daniel McLay (GBR)	Bretagne–Séché Environnement	+ 0"
6	Floris Gerts (NED)	BMC Racing Team	+ 0"
7	Arman Kamyshev (KAZ)	Astana	+ 0"
8	Michael Van Staeyen (BEL)	Cofidis	+ 0"
9	Sondre Holst Enger (NOR)	IAM Cycling	+ 0"
10	Oscar Landa (NOR)	Team Coop-Øster Hus	+ 0"
Source: ProCyclingStats

General classification after stage 2
Rank	Rider	Team	Time
1	Alexander Kristoff (NOR)	Team Katusha	8h 39' 30"
2	Edvald Boasson Hagen (NOR)	MTN–Qhubeka	+ 2"
3	Sam Bennett (IRL)	Bora–Argon 18	+ 7"
4	Amaury Capiot (BEL)	Topsport Vlaanderen–Baloise	+ 9"
5	Michael Van Staeyen (BEL)	Cofidis	+ 11"
6	Niccolo Bonifazio (ITA)	Lampre–Merida	+ 11"
7	Sondre Holst Enger (NOR)	IAM Cycling	+ 11"
8	Floris Gerts (NED)	BMC Racing Team	+ 11"
9	Anthony Turgis (FRA)	Cofidis	+ 11"
10	Jarl Salomein (BEL)	Topsport Vlaanderen–Baloise	+ 11"
Source: ProCyclingStats

=== Stage 3 ===
15 August 2015 – Finnsnes on Senja to Fjellandsby in Målselv, 175 km (109 mi)

Stage 3 result
Rank	Rider	Team	Time
1	Ben Hermans (BEL)	BMC Racing Team	4h 27' 10"
2	Rein Taaramäe (EST)	Astana	+ 3"
3	Mathias Frank (SUI)	IAM Cycling	+ 10"
4	Silvan Dillier (SUI)	BMC Racing Team	+ 14"
5	Dylan Teuns (BEL)	BMC Racing Team	+ 17"
6	Ilnur Zakarin (RUS)	Team Katusha	+ 20"
7	Louis Meintjes (RSA)	MTN–Qhubeka	+ 23"
8	Edvald Boasson Hagen (NOR)	MTN–Qhubeka	+ 23"
9	Marcel Wyss (SUI)	IAM Cycling	+ 23"
10	Odd Christian Eiking (NOR)	Team Joker	+ 28"
Source: ProCyclingStats

General classification after stage 3
Rank	Rider	Team	Time
1	Ben Hermans (BEL)	BMC Racing Team	13h 06' 41"
2	Rein Taaramäe (EST)	Astana	+ 7"
3	Edvald Boasson Hagen (NOR)	MTN–Qhubeka	+ 24"
4	Silvan Dillier (SUI)	BMC Racing Team	+ 24"
5	Mathias Frank (SUI)	IAM Cycling	+ 25"
6	Dylan Teuns (BEL)	BMC Racing Team	+ 27"
7	Odd Christian Eiking (NOR)	Team Joker	+ 38"
8	Rasmus Guldhammer (DEN)	Cult Energy Pro Cycling	+ 40"
9	Ilnur Zakarin (RUS)	Team Katusha	+ 41"
10	Marcel Wyss (SUI)	IAM Cycling	+ 42"
Source: ProCyclingStats

=== Stage 4 ===
16 August 2015 – Narvik to Narvik, 160 km (99 mi)

Stage 4 result
Rank	Rider	Team	Time
1	Silvan Dillier (SUI)	BMC Racing Team	3h 35' 18"
2	Ilnur Zakarin (RUS)	Team Katusha	+ 0"
3	Rein Taaramäe (EST)	Astana	+ 2"
4	Sven Erik Bystrøm (NOR)	Team Katusha	+ 40"
5	Rasmus Guldhammer (DEN)	Cult Energy Pro Cycling	+ 42"
6	Antwan Tolhoek (NED)	Tinkoff–Saxo	+ 42"
7	Odd Christian Eiking (NOR)	Team Joker	+ 42"
8	Anthony Turgis (FRA)	Cofidis	+ 42"
9	Mathias Frank (SUI)	IAM Cycling	+ 42"
10	Edvald Boasson Hagen (NOR)	MTN–Qhubeka	+ 42"
Source: ProCyclingStats, CyclingNews

Final general classification
Rank	Rider	Team	Time
1	Rein Taaramäe (EST)	Astana	16h 42' 02"
2	Silvan Dillier (SUI)	BMC Racing Team	+ 8"
3	Ilnur Zakarin (RUS)	Team Katusha	+ 31"
4	Edvald Boasson Hagen (NOR)	MTN–Qhubeka	+ 1' 02"
5	Mathias Frank (SUI)	IAM Cycling	+ 1' 04"
6	Odd Christian Eiking (NOR)	Team Joker	+ 1' 17"
7	Rasmus Guldhammer (DEN)	Cult Energy Pro Cycling	+ 1' 19"
8	Anthony Turgis (FRA)	Cofidis	+ 1' 31"
9	Ben Hermans (BEL)	BMC Racing Team	+ 1' 33"
10	Marcel Wyss (SUI)	IAM Cycling	+ 1' 33"
Source: ProCyclingStats

== Classifications ==
The race included four main classifications: the general classification, the points classification, the mountains classification and the youth classification. There was also an award for the most aggressive rider on each stage and a team classification.

Stage	Winner	General classification	Points classification	Mountains classification	Youth classification	Team classification	Combativity award
1	Alexander Kristoff	Alexander Kristoff	Alexander Kristoff	Vegard Stake Laengen	Sam Bennett	Cult Energy Pro Cycling	Marius Hafsas
2	Sam Bennett	Alexander Kristoff	Alexander Kristoff	August Jensen	Sam Bennett	Cult Energy Pro Cycling	Jean-Marc Bideau
3	Ben Hermans	Ben Hermans	Alexander Kristoff	Haavard Blikra	Silvan Dillier	BMC Racing Team	Herman Dahl
4	Silvan Dillier	Rein Taaramäe	Alexander Kristoff	August Jensen	Silvan Dillier	BMC Racing Team	Maxime Cam
Final		Rein Taaramäe	Alexander Kristoff	August Jensen	Silvan Dillier	BMC Racing Team	not awarded
