= Maxime Cam =

French cyclist

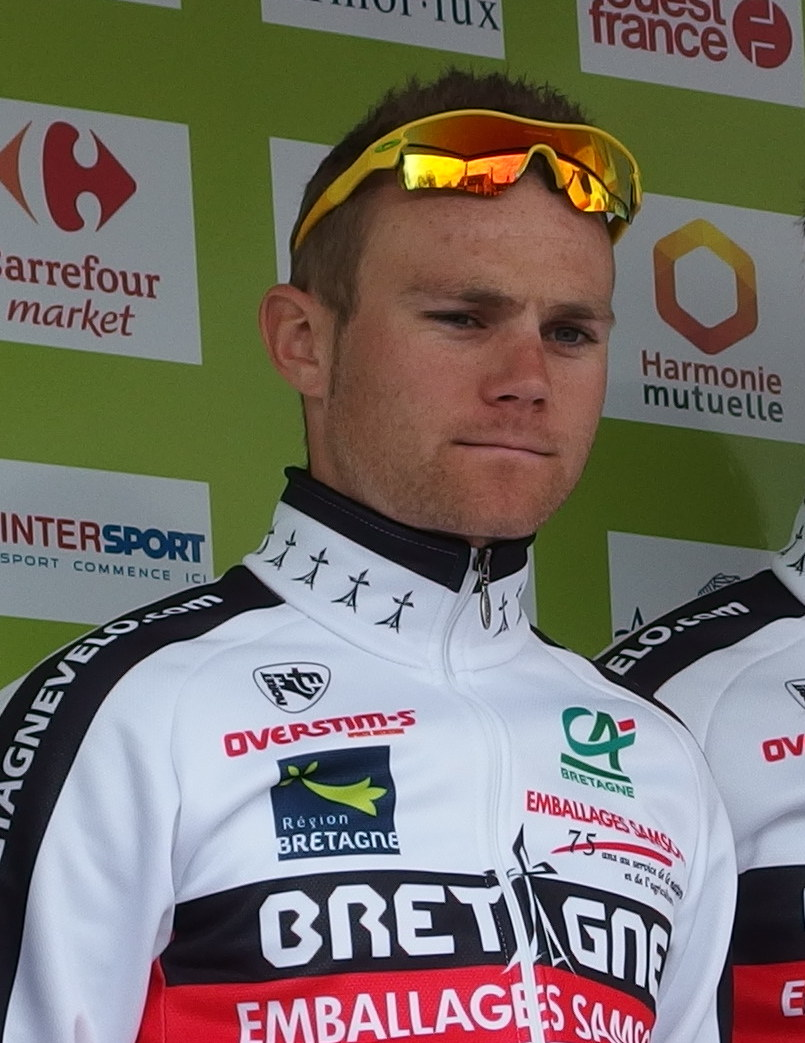
- Cam in 2014

Personal information
- Full name: Maxime Cam
- Born: 9 July 1992 (age 34) Landerneau, France
- Height: 1.69 m (5 ft 7 in)
- Weight: 62 kg (137 lb)

Cycling career
- Sport: Cycling
- Current team: E.C. Landerneau
- Discipline: Road
- Role: Rider
- Rider type: Puncheur

Amateur teams
- 2008: Landivisienne Cycliste
- 2009–2012: UC Briochine
- 2013–2014: BIC 2000
- 2017: Côtes d'Armor–Marie Morin
- 2018: VC Pays de Loudéac
- 2022: Dinan Sport Cycling
- 2023–: E.C. Landerneau

Professional teams
- 2015–2016: Bretagne–Séché Environnement
- 2019–2021: Vital Concept–B&B Hotels

Maxime Cam (born 9 July 1992) is a French professional racing cyclist, who currently rides for French club team E.C. Landerneau.

== Major results ==
2010
2nd Ronde des Vallées
2014
5th Overall Kreiz Breizh Elites
2017
5th Overall Tour de Bretagne Cycliste
6th Paris–Chauny
2019
3rd Overall Kreiz Breizh Elites
