= Mário Costa =

Portuguese cyclist

Marío Costa
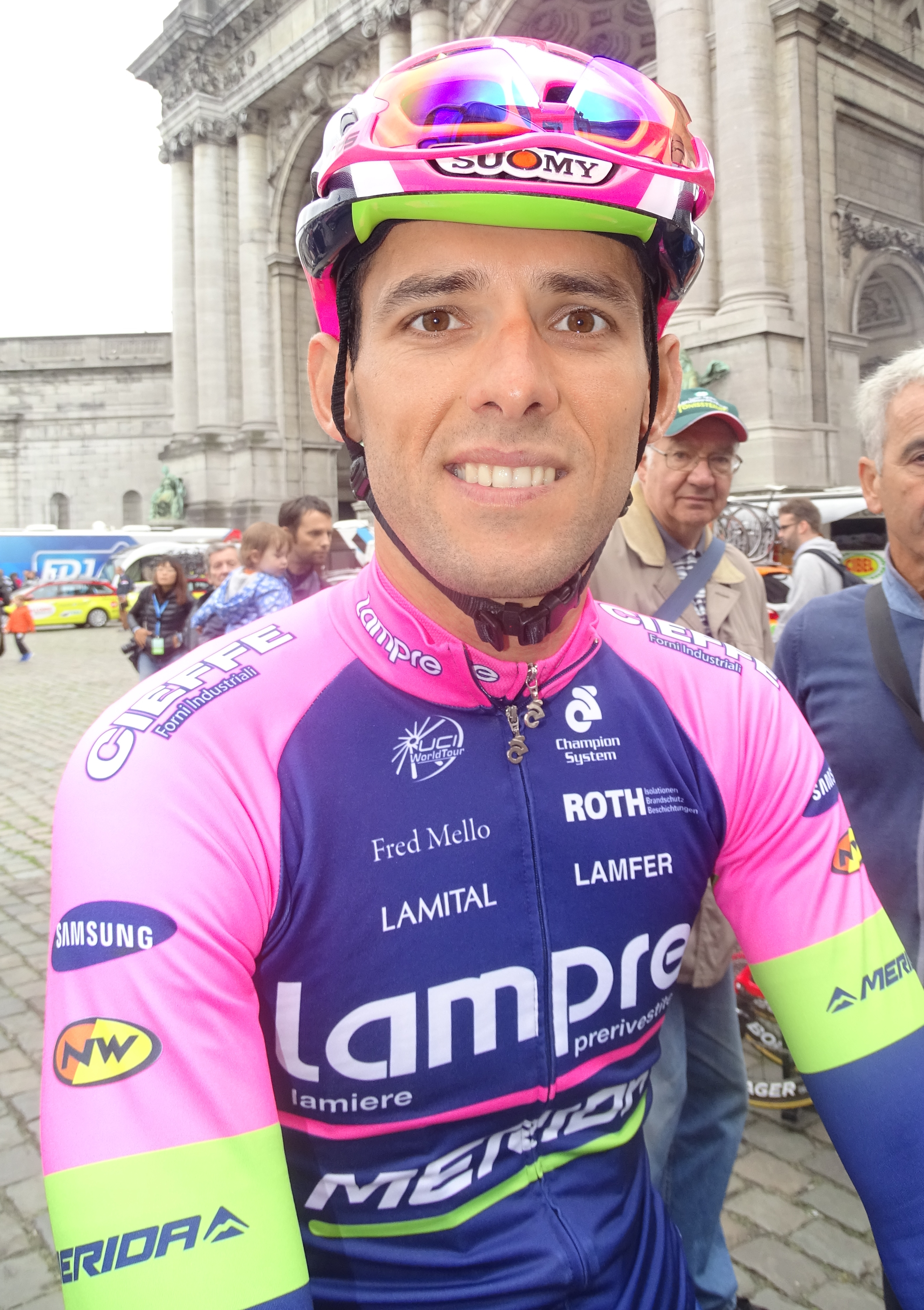
- Costa in September 2015

Personal information
- Full name: Mário Jorge Faria da Costa
- Born: 15 November 1985 (age 40) Aguçadoura, Póvoa de Varzim

Cycling career
- Sport: Cycling
- Current team: Retired
- Discipline: Road
- Role: Rider

Amateur teams
- 2002: Marilina–ASC–Vila do Conde
- 2003–2004: ASC–Guilhabreu–Vila do Conde
- 2005–2006: Santa Maria da Feira–E Leclerc
- 2007: Benfica Juniors
- 2011: CC Loulé–Louletano–Aquashow

Professional teams
- 2008: Benfica
- 2009–2010: Barbot–Siper
- 2013–2014: OFM–Quinta da Lixa
- 2015–2016: Lampre–Merida

Mário Jorge Faria da Costa (born 15 November 1985 in Aguçadoura, Póvoa de Varzim) is a Portuguese former professional cyclist, who competed professionally between 2008 and 2010 and then again from 2013 to 2016. He was named in the startlist for the 2016 Vuelta a España.

== Major results ==
2003
1st Road race, National Junior Road Championships
2006
2nd Time trial, National Road Championships
2010
3rd Time trial, National Road Championships
2011
2nd Road race, National Road Championships
2015
1st National Cyclo-cross Championships
2016
10th Overall Tour of Hainan

=== Grand Tour general classification results timeline ===
Grand Tour	2016
Giro d'Italia	—
Tour de France	—
Vuelta a España	DNF

Legend
—	Did not compete
DNF	Did not finish
