= 2015 FDJ season =

FDJ
- 2015 season
- UCI code: FDJ
- Status: UCI ProTeam
- Manager: Marc Madiot
- Main sponsor(s): Française des Jeux
- Based: France
- Bicycles: Lapierre
- Groupset: Shimano

Season victories
- One-day races: 2
- Stage race overall: 1
- Stage race stages: 11

The 2014 season for FDJ began in January at the Tour Down Under. As a UCI WorldTeam, they were automatically invited and obligated to send a squad to every event in the UCI World Tour.

== Team roster ==
As of 1 January 2015

Rider	Date of birth
William Bonnet (FRA)	25 June 1982 (aged 32)
David Boucher (BEL)	17 March 1980 (aged 34)
Sébastien Chavanel (FRA)	21 March 1983 (aged 31)
Arnaud Courteille (FRA)	13 March 1989 (aged 25)
Mickaël Delage (FRA)	6 August 1985 (aged 29)
Arnaud Démare (FRA)	26 August 1991 (aged 23)
Kenny Elissonde (FRA)	22 July 1991 (aged 23)
Murilo Fischer (BRA)	16 June 1979 (aged 35)
Alexandre Geniez (FRA)	16 April 1988 (aged 26)
Anthony Geslin (FRA)	9 June 1980 (aged 34)
Arnold Jeannesson (FRA)	15 January 1986 (aged 28)
Mathieu Ladagnous (FRA)	12 December 1984 (aged 30)
Johan Le Bon (FRA)	3 October 1990 (aged 24)
Olivier Le Gac (FRA)	27 August 1993 (aged 21)
Pierre-Henri Lecuisinier (FRA)	30 June 1993 (aged 21)

Rider	Date of birth
Lorrenzo Manzin (FRA)	26 July 1994 (aged 20)
Steve Morabito (SUI)	30 January 1983 (aged 31)
Francis Mourey (FRA)	8 December 1980 (aged 34)
Yoann Offredo (FRA)	12 November 1986 (aged 28)
Laurent Pichon (FRA)	19 July 1986 (aged 28)
Cédric Pineau (FRA)	8 May 1985 (aged 29)
Thibaut Pinot (FRA)	29 May 1990 (aged 24)
Kévin Reza (FRA)	18 May 1988 (aged 26)
Anthony Roux (FRA)	18 April 1987 (aged 27)
Jérémy Roy (FRA)	22 June 1983 (aged 31)
Marc Sarreau (FRA)	10 June 1993 (aged 21)
Benoît Vaugrenard (FRA)	5 January 1982 (aged 32)
Jussi Veikkanen (FIN)	29 March 1981 (aged 33)
Arthur Vichot (FRA)	26 November 1988 (aged 26)

Riders who joined the team for the 2015 season

Rider	2014 team
Lorrenzo Manzin	neo-pro (Team UCNA)
Steve Morabito	BMC Racing Team
Kévin Reza	Team Europcar
Marc Sarreau	neo-pro (Armée de Terre)

Riders who left the team during or after the 2014 season

Rider	2015 team
Nacer Bouhanni	Cofidis
Pierrick Fédrigo	Bretagne–Séché Environnement
Laurent Mangel	Retired
Geoffrey Soupe	Cofidis
Émilien Viennet	AVC Aix-en-Provence

== Season victories ==
Date	Race	Competition	Rider	Country	Location
29 March	Critérium International, Young rider classification	UCI Europe Tour	Thibaut Pinot (FRA)	France	
8 April	Circuit de la Sarthe, Stage 2a	UCI Europe Tour	Anthony Roux (FRA)	France	Angers
19 April	Tro-Bro Léon	UCI Europe Tour	Alexandre Geniez (FRA)	France	Lannilis
26 April	La Roue Tourangelle	UCI Europe Tour	Lorrenzo Manzin (FRA)	France	Tours
2 May	Tour de Romandie, Stage 5	UCI World Tour	Thibaut Pinot (FRA)	Switzerland	Champex
3 May	Tour de Romandie, Young rider classification	UCI World Tour	Thibaut Pinot (FRA)	Switzerland	
29 May	Tour of Belgium, Stage 2	UCI Europe Tour	Arnaud Démare (FRA)	Belgium	Herzele
30 May	Tour of Belgium, Stage 3	UCI Europe Tour	Arnaud Démare (FRA)	Belgium	Eau d'Heure lakes
4 June	Boucles de la Mayenne, Prologue	UCI Europe Tour	Johan Le Bon (FRA)	France	Laval
17 June	Tour de Suisse, Stage 5	UCI World Tour	Thibaut Pinot (FRA)	Austria	Sölden
25 July	Tour de France, Stage 20	UCI World Tour	Thibaut Pinot (FRA)	France	Alpe d'Huez
14 August	Eneco Tour, Stage 5	UCI World Tour	Johan Le Bon (FRA)	Netherlands	Sittard-Geleen
14 August	Tour de l'Ain, Stage 3	UCI Europe Tour	Alexandre Geniez (FRA)	France	Bellignat
27 August	Tour du Poitou-Charentes, Stage 3	UCI Europe Tour	Marc Sarreau (FRA)	France	Loudun
26 September	Tour du Gévaudan Languedoc-Roussillon, Stage 1	UCI Europe Tour	Thibaut Pinot (FRA)	France	Florac
27 September	Tour du Gévaudan Languedoc-Roussillon, Overall	UCI Europe Tour	Thibaut Pinot (FRA)	France	
27 September	Tour du Gévaudan Languedoc-Roussillon, Points classification	UCI Europe Tour	Thibaut Pinot (FRA)	France	
