= 2015 Vuelta a Burgos =

2015 UCI Europe Tour

Race details
- Dates: 4 August – 8 August
- Stages: 5

The 2015 Vuelta a Burgos was a men's road bicycle race which was held from 4 August to 8 August 2015. It was the 37th edition of the stage race, which was established in 1946. The race was rated as a 2.HC event and forms part of the 2015 UCI Europe Tour. The race was made up of five stages and was won by Rein Taaramäe of Astana.

== Teams ==
A total of 11 teams with 8 riders each will race in the 2015 Vuelta a Burgos: 4 UCI ProTeams, 5 UCI Professional Continental Teams and 2 UCI Continental Teams.

World Tour teams

- AG2R La Mondiale
- Astana
- Team Katusha
- Movistar Team

Professional Continental teams

- Caja Rural–Seguros RGA
- Bretagne–Séché Environnement
- Colombia
- Southeast Pro Cycling
- Nippo–Vini Fantini

Continental teams

- Burgos BH
- Murias Taldea

== Route ==
Stage characteristics and winners
Stage	Date	Course	Distance	Type	Winner
1	4 August	Santo Domingo de Silos to Clunia	149 km (92.6 mi)	Hilly stage	Carlos Barbero (ESP)
2	5 August	Burgos	13.1 km (8.1 mi)	Team Time Trial	Astana
3	6 August	Castrojeriz to Villadiego	165 km (102.5 mi)	Flat stage	Vladimir Isaichev (RUS)
4	7 August	Belorado to Pineda de la Sierra	161 km (100.0 mi)	Flat stage	Miguel Ángel López (COL)
5	8 August	Comunero de Revenga to Lagunas de Neila	170 km (105.6 mi)	Mountain stage	Daniel Moreno (ESP)

== Classification leadership ==
Stage	Winner	General classification	Points classification	Mountains classification	Young rider classification	Team classification
1	Carlos Barbero	Carlos Barbero	Carlos Barbero	Fabio Duarte	Carlos Barbero	Caja Rural–Seguros RGA
2	Astana	Luis León Sánchez	Luis León Sánchez	Fabio Duarte	Miguel Ángel López	Astana
3	Vladimir Isaichev	Luis León Sánchez	Luis León Sánchez	Fabio Duarte	Miguel Ángel López	Astana
4	Miguel Ángel López	Miguel Ángel López	Luis León Sánchez	Fabio Duarte	Miguel Ángel López	Astana
5	Daniel Moreno	Rein Taaramäe	Daniel Moreno	Fabio Duarte	Miguel Ángel López	Astana
Final		Rein Taaramäe	Daniel Moreno	Fabio Duarte	Miguel Ángel López	Astana
