= Julian Kern =

German road bicycle racer

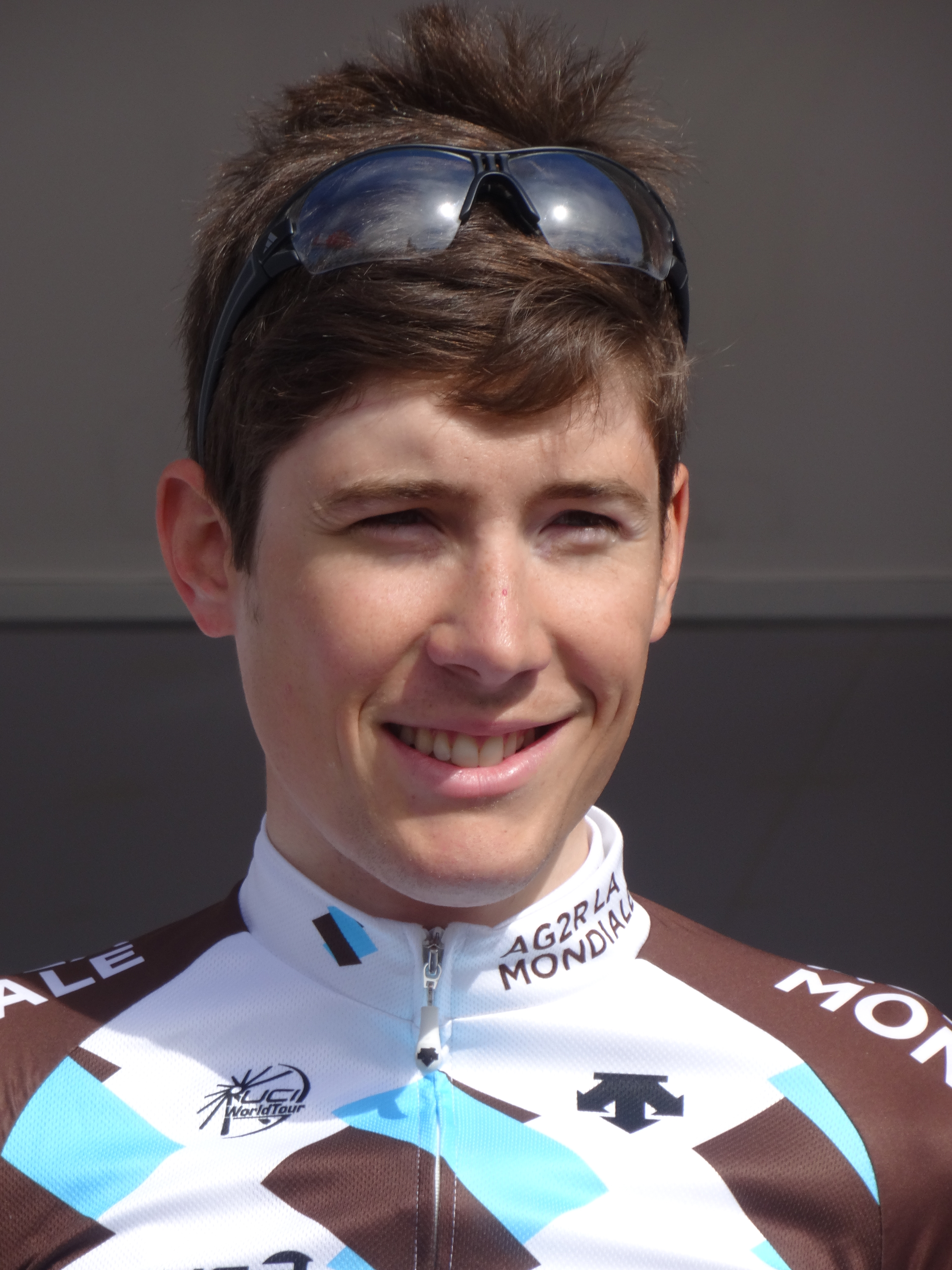
- Kern at the 2014 Grand Prix de Denain

Personal information
- Full name: Julian Kern
- Born: December 28, 1989 (age 36) Eichstetten am Kaiserstuhl, West Germany
- Height: 1.81 m (5 ft 11 in)
- Weight: 65 kg (143 lb; 10.2 st)

Cycling career
- Sport: Cycling
- Current team: Retired
- Discipline: Road
- Role: Rider
- Rider type: Stage races

Amateur team
- 2011: Seven Stones

Professional teams
- 2012: Leopard–Trek Continental Team
- 2013–2014: Ag2r–La Mondiale
Medal record
Representing Italy
Men's road bicycle racing
European Championships
Gold medal – first place	2011 Offida	Under-23 road race

Julian Kern (born December 28, 1989) is a German former road bicycle racer. Kern previously competed for the Leopard–Trek Continental Team during the 2012 season, before joining Ag2r–La Mondiale on a two-year contract from the 2013 season onwards. In November 2014, Kern retired from cycling when his contract expired and he was unable to find a new team.

== Major results ==
2009
6th Overall Tour des Pays de Savoie
2011
1st Road race, UEC European Under-23 Road Championships
2012
2nd Overall Flèche du Sud

1st Stage 3

2nd Overall Tour du Loir-et-Cher
4th GP Südkärnten
