= Vladimir Isaichev =

Russian racing cyclist

Vladimir Isaychev
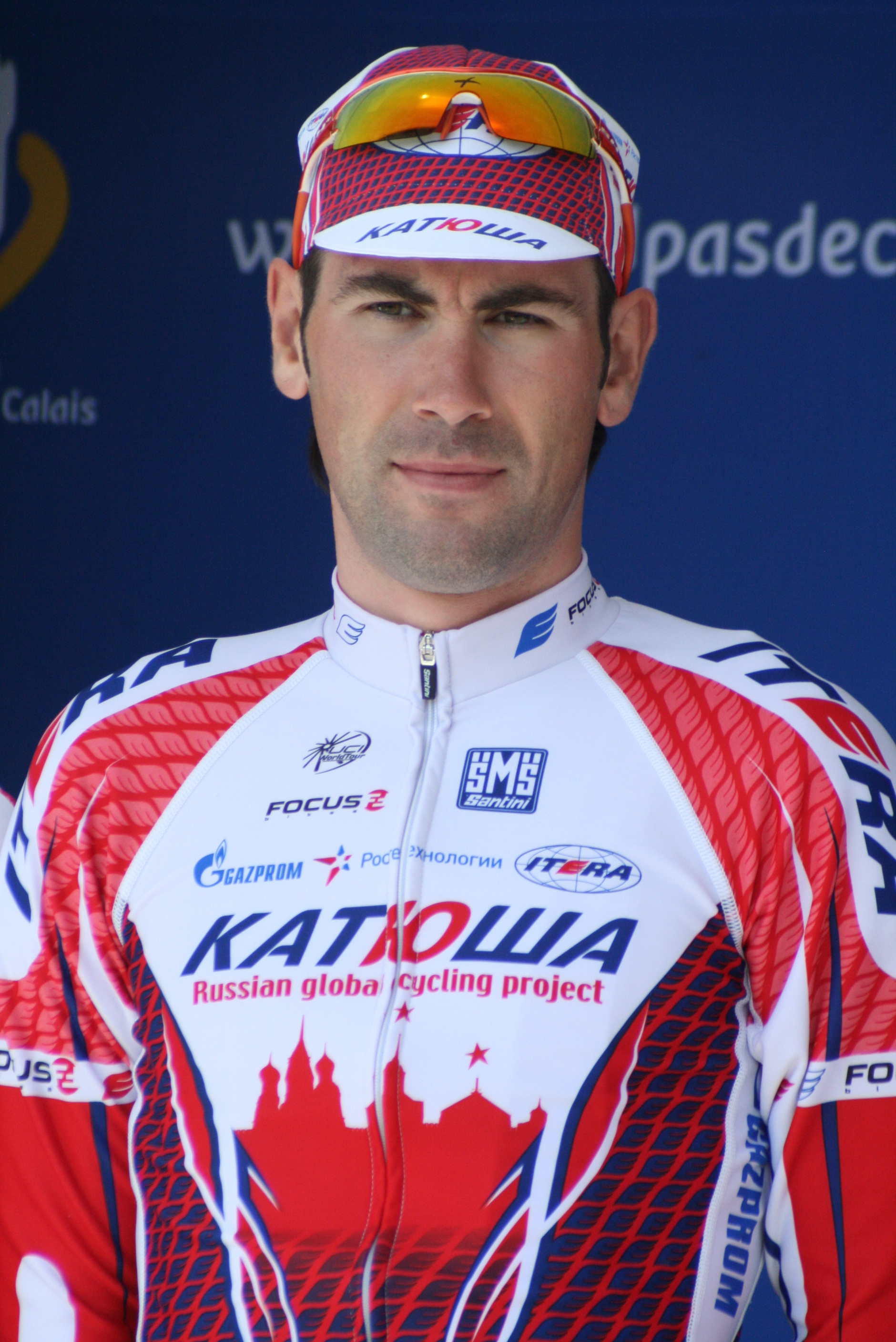
- Isaichev at the 2011 Four Days of Dunkirk

Personal information
- Full name: Vladimir Yevgenyevich Isaychev
- Born: April 21, 1986 (age 40) Samara, Russia
- Height: 1.88 m (6 ft 2 in)
- Weight: 80 kg (176 lb)

Cycling career
- Sport: Cycling
- Discipline: Road
- Role: Rider
- Rider type: All-rounder

Professional teams
- 2005: Lokomotiv
- 2008–2010: Karpin–Galicia
- 2011–2016: Team Katusha

Major wins
- National Road Race Championships (2013)

Vladimir Yevgenyevich Isaychev (Russian: Владимир Евгеньевич Исайчев; born April 21, 1986) is a Russian professional road racing cyclist who rode most recently for UCI ProTeam Team Katusha.

== Major results ==
2007
10th Grand Prix of Moscow
2012
1st Stage 5 Tour de Suisse
2013
1st Road race, National Road Championships
2015
1st Stage 3 Vuelta a Burgos
1st Prologue (TTT) Tour of Austria

=== Grand Tour general classification results timeline ===
Grand Tour	2009	2010	2011	2012	2013	2014	2015
Giro d'Italia	164	—	—	—	—	—	—
Tour de France	—	—	DNF	—	—	157	—
Vuelta a España	—	133	—	—	131	—	DNF

Legend
—	Did not compete
DNF	Did not finish
