= Clément Chevrier =

French bicycle racer

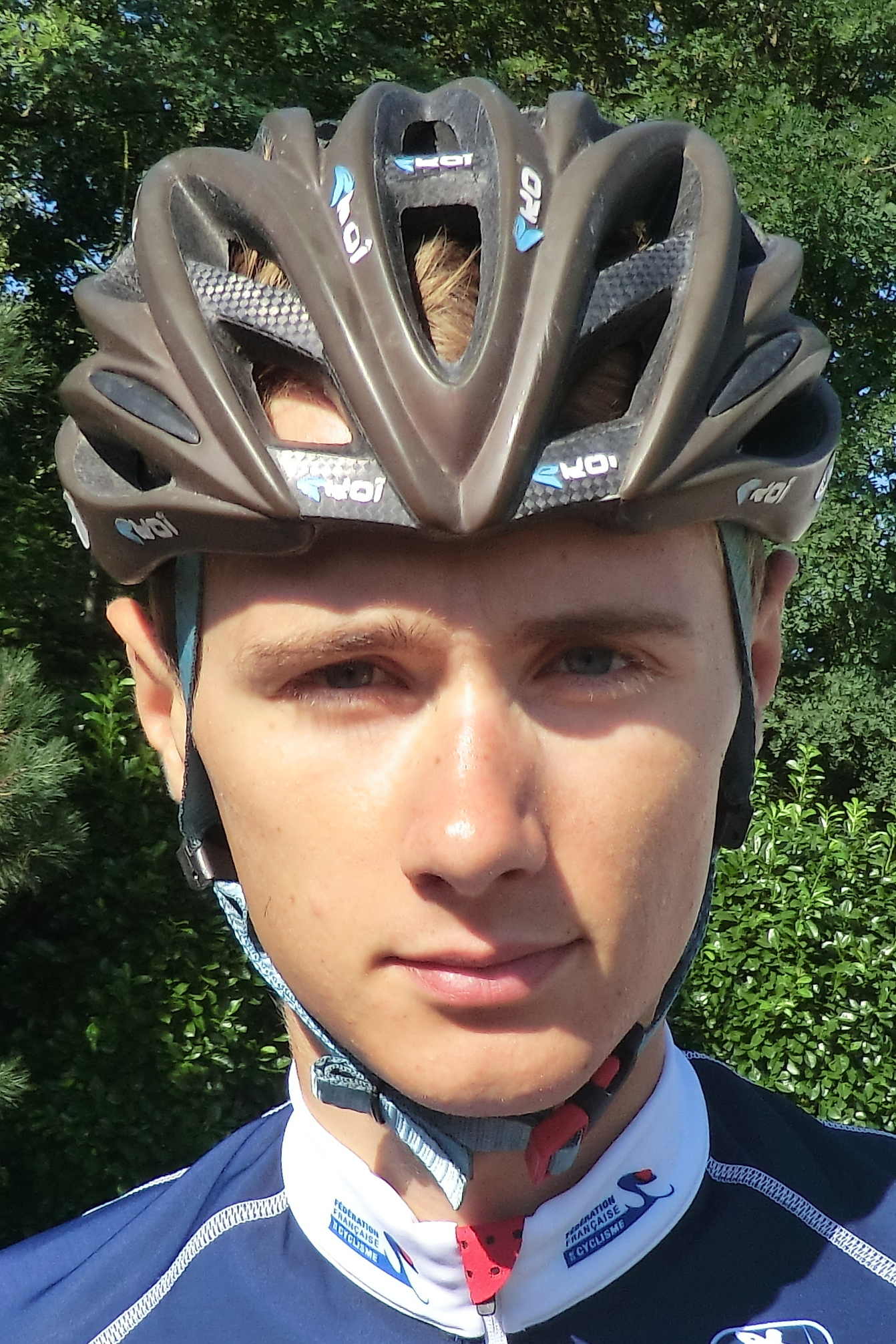

Personal information
- Full name: Clément Chevrier
- Born: 29 June 1992 (age 34) Amiens, France
- Height: 1.77 m (5 ft 10 in)
- Weight: 56 kg (123 lb)

Cycling career
- Sport: Cycling
- Current team: Retired
- Discipline: Road
- Role: Rider

Amateur teams
- 2009–2011: VC Beauvaisien Oise
- 2011–2013: Chambéry CF

Professional teams
- 2014: Bissell Development Team
- 2014: Trek Factory Racing (stagiaire)
- 2015–2016: IAM Cycling
- 2017–2020: AG2R La Mondiale

Clément Chevrier (born 29 June 1992 in Amiens) is a French former professional cyclist, who rode professionally between 2014 and 2020, for the Bissell Development Team, IAM Cycling and AG2R La Mondiale teams. Upon retiring, Chevrier announced his intention to become a sommelier.

== Major results ==
2010
5th Overall Tre Ciclistica Bresciana

1st Stage 2

2012
7th Piccolo Giro di Lombardia
2013
2nd Overall Tour des Pays de Savoie

1st Stage 4

3rd Overall Giro della Valle d'Aosta
9th Piccolo Giro di Lombardia
10th Overall Ronde de l'Isard
2014
1st Overall San Dimas Stage Race
1st Young rider classification USA Pro Cycling Challenge

=== Grand Tour general classification results timeline ===
Grand Tour	2015	2016	2017	2018	2019
Giro d'Italia	69	—	81	—	—
Tour de France	Did not contest during his career				
Vuelta a España	—	41	61	—	59

Legend
—	Did not compete
DNF	Did not finish
