= Rein Taaramäe =

Estonian road bicycle racer

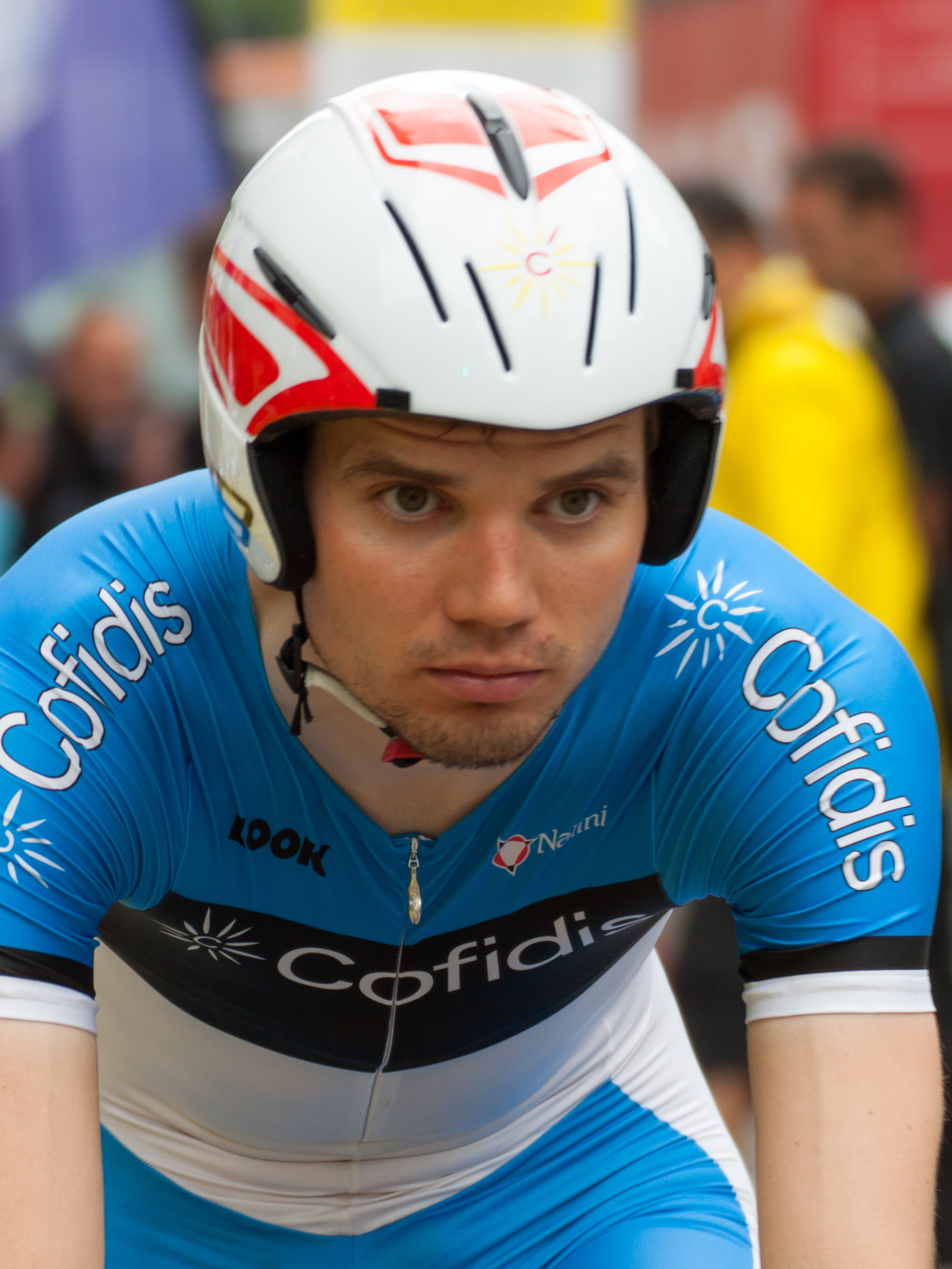
- Taaramäe at the 2012 Critérium du Dauphiné

Personal information
- Full name: Rein Taaramäe
- Nicknames: Vader (from "Reinuvader Rebane" – a literary fox), Taarakas
- Born: 24 April 1987 (age 39) Tartu, then part of Estonian SSR, Soviet Union
- Height: 1.84 m (6 ft 0 in)
- Weight: 67 kg (148 lb; 10.6 st)

Cycling career
- Sport: Cycling
- Current team: Kinan Racing Team
- Discipline: Road
- Role: Rider

Amateur teams
- 2006–2007: Roue d'or Saint-Amandoise
- 2007: Cofidis (stagiaire)

Professional teams
- 2008–2014: Cofidis
- 2015: Astana
- 2016–2017: Team Katusha
- 2018–2020: Direct Énergie
- 2021–2024: Intermarché–Wanty–Gobert Matériaux
- 2025–: Kinan Racing Team

Major wins
- Grand Tours Giro d'Italia 1 individual stage (2016) Vuelta a España 2 individual stages (2011, 2021) Stage races Vuelta a Burgos (2015) Arctic Race of Norway (2015) Tour of Slovenia (2016) Tour of Sharjah (2026) Single-day races and Classics National Road Race Championships (2009, 2013) National Time Trial Championships (2009, 2011, 2012, 2019, 2021–2025)

Rein Taaramäe (born 24 April 1987) is an Estonian professional road racing cyclist, who rides for UCI Continental team Kinan Racing Team.

== Career ==
=== Cofidis (2008–14) ===
Taaramäe turned professional in 2008 for Cofidis after riding for the team as a stagiaire in late 2007 and winning a stage at the Circuit des Ardennes early in the season. In 2008 he won two stages of the Grand Prix du Portugal and a stage of the Tour de l'Avenir. At the 2008 Summer Olympics, Taaramäe competed in the road race and the road time trial.

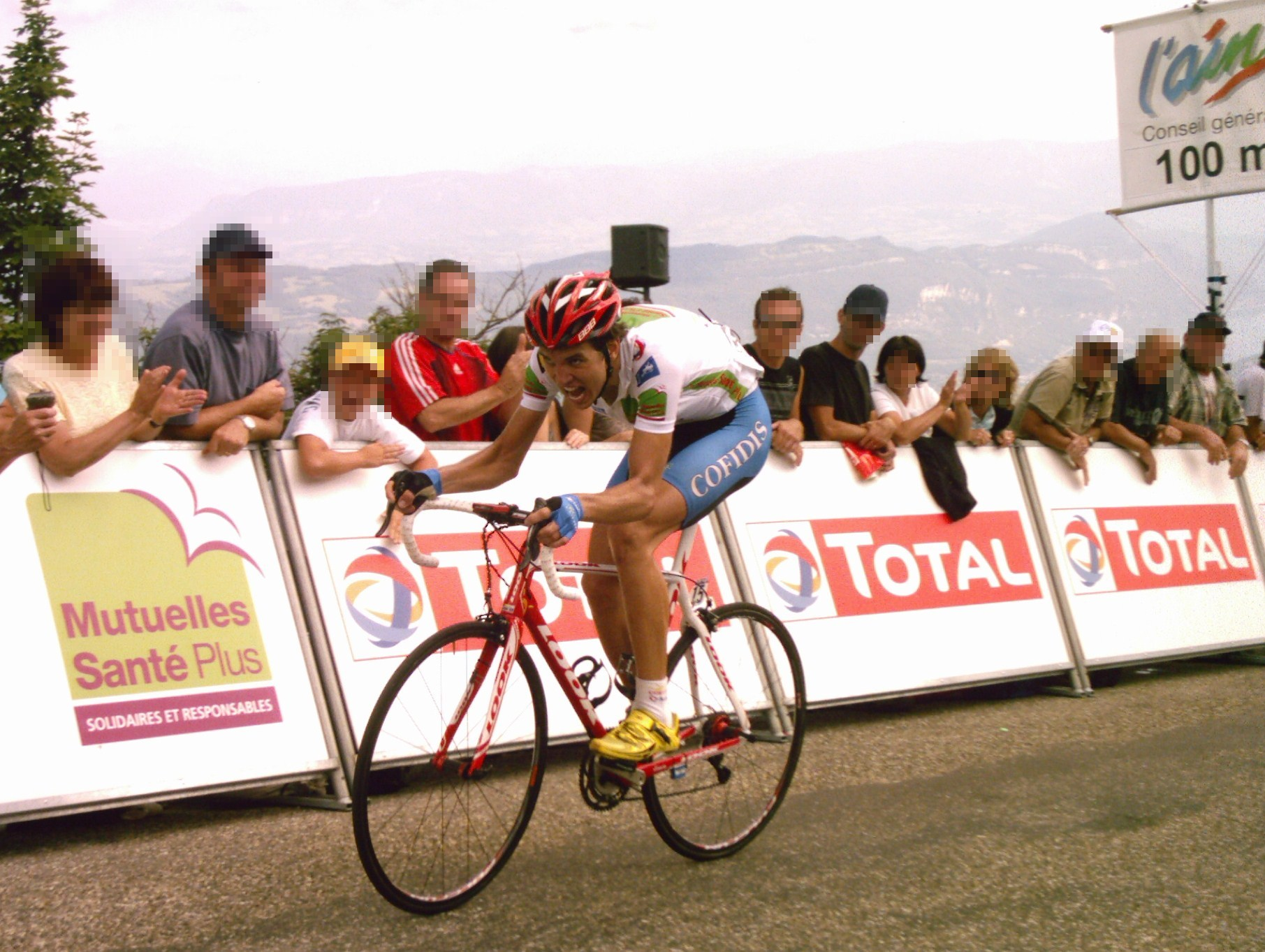
Taaramäe at the 2009 Tour de l'Ain

In 2009 he finished third at the Tour de Romandie and eighth at the Tour de Suisse. Taaramäe won both the Estonian National Road Race Championships and the Estonian National Time Trial Championships. He also won the Tour de l'Ain after winning the last stage to Col du Grand Colombier. In 2010 he finished seventh at the Paris-Nice and third at the Volta a Catalunya.

In 2011, Taaramäe finished 11th overall in the Tour de France. On Stage 14 of the Vuelta a España Taaramae and breakaway companion David de la Fuente were the last two riders of a 17-man breakaway, but with 2 kilometres (1.2 miles) to go de la Fuente dropped back to pace teammate Juan José Cobo up the climb allowing Taaramäe to solo to his first ever Grand Tour stage win. He ultimately withdrew from the race prior to its conclusion in Madrid.

=== Astana (2015) ===
In August 2014 Astana general manager Alexander Vinokourov announced that Taaramäe had signed a one-year contract with the team for the 2015 season.

2015 began well for Taaramäe with the victory at the Vuelta a Murcia. Hopes were high with Grand Tours in mind, especially the Tour de France. At the race, Taaramäe was meant to help Vincenzo Nibali in the mountains. Unfortunately Taaramäe was forced to abandon the race during stage 11 due to illness. After the disappointing Tour, Taaramäe went on to win in style back-to-back in the Vuelta a Burgos and the Arctic Race of Norway in August.

=== Team Katusha (2016–17) ===
At the end of August 2015, Taaramäe signed an initial one-year deal with Team Katusha. He was named in the start list for the 2016 Giro d'Italia. He won the 20th stage of the race, becoming the first Estonian to win a stage in the Giro. After a short vacation at home in Estonia, Taaramäe went to win the overall at the Tour of Slovenia, together with a stage win on Stage 2.

=== Direct Énergie (2018–20) ===
In his first season with the team, he placed highly at the Vuelta a Aragón (fourth overall; later promoted to third after Jaime Rosón's disqualification) and the Tour de l'Ain (third overall), before being selected for the Tour de France for the first time since 2015. He formed part of the breakaway on the tenth stage, ultimately finishing third – his team's best stage finish of the race – behind Julian Alaphilippe and Ion Izagirre. He finished outside the time limit two days later, ending his race. In September, Taaramäe took four top-four results – second-place finishes at the Coppa Ugo Agostoni and the Tour du Gévaudan Occitanie, third at the Tour du Doubs, and fourth at the Famenne Ardenne Classic.

The following year, he finished second overall at the Tour du Rwanda; he had finished second on the third stage behind Merhawi Kudus, and maintained this position for the remainder of the race. He finished third overall at both the Vuelta a Aragón and Tour de l'Ain, and added a further third-place finish at the inaugural Mont Ventoux Dénivelé Challenge. Later in June, he won his fourth Estonian National Time Trial Championships, his first win in the race since 2012.

In 2020, Taaramäe won the mountains classification at the Tour du Rwanda, prior to the COVID-19 pandemic-enforced suspension of racing.

=== Intermarché–Wanty–Gobert Matériaux (2021–2024) ===
In September 2020, Taaramäe signed a two-year contract to ride with the Circus–Wanty Gobert team, later renamed Intermarché–Wanty–Gobert Matériaux, from the 2021 season.

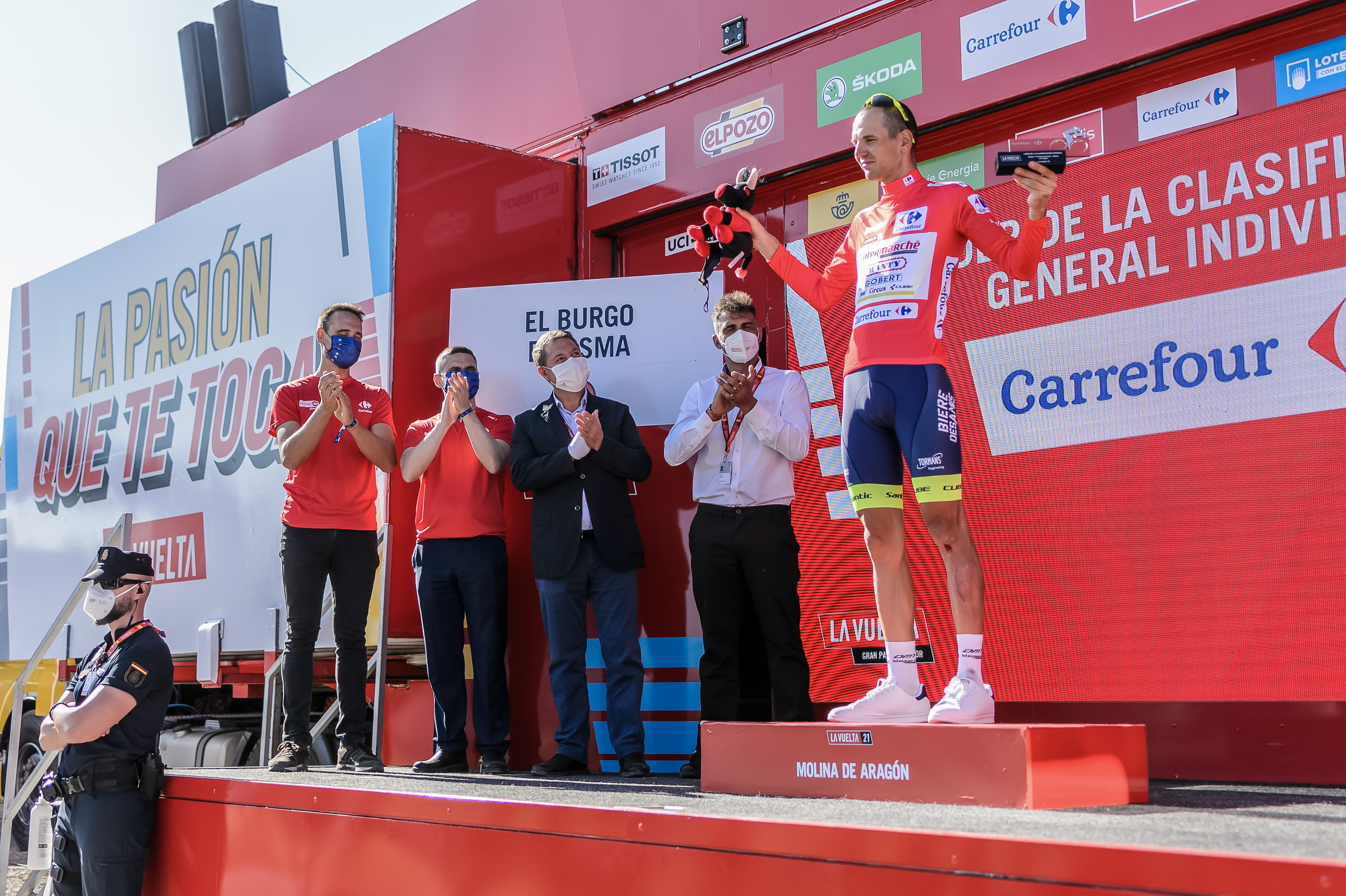
Taaramäe on the podium as the race leader following the fourth stage of the 2021 Vuelta a España. He became the first Estonian rider to lead the race overall, following his victory on the previous stage.

He was involved in breakaways at Paris–Nice, the Volta a Catalunya, the Tour de Romandie, and the Giro d'Italia; at the Giro d'Italia, he recorded a ninth-place finish on stage four, having just remained clear of a group containing some of the race favourites. He won the Estonian National Time Trial Championships for the fifth time in June, and then finished third overall at the Czech Cycling Tour, with two third-place stage finishes. At the Vuelta a España, Taaramäe made an eight-man breakaway on the third stage of the race. With around 3 kilometres (1.9 miles) remaining of the stage, which concluded with a summit finish at Picón Blanco, Taaramäe attacked and soloed to the stage victory. He also assumed the lead of both the mountains and general classifications, becoming the second Estonian rider to lead a Grand Tour, after Jaan Kirsipuu at the 1999 Tour de France. He held the race lead until the fifth stage after a crash, and also rode in support of teammate Odd Christian Eiking, when he held the overall lead later in the race. Taaramäe later signed a one-year contract extension with the team, until the end of the 2023 season.

After an eighth-place finish at the 2022 Tour of Oman, Taaramäe made the breakaway on the fourth stage of the Giro d'Italia, finishing third on the stage. He remained third overall for several days, before losing nearly fifteen minutes on the ninth stage, a summit finish at Blockhaus in the Maiella massif. He worked as a domestique for climbers Jan Hirt and Domenico Pozzovivo later in the race, with both finishing inside the top-ten placings in the general classification. He again won the Estonian National Time Trial Championships, and took a further third-place Grand Tour stage finish, on stage eight of the Vuelta a España.

He started his 2023 season in Oman, recording a fourth-place overall finish at the Tour of Oman, having been dropped on the final climb to Jebel Akhdar.

In 2025 season, he moved to a Japanese continental team Kinan Racing Team.

== Personal life ==
He is married to Hanna; at the 2022 Estonian National Time Trial Championships, both won their respective national titles.

== Major results ==
2005
3rd Overall Course de la Paix Juniors
2006
1st Time trial, National Under-23 Road Championships
1st GP Ouest–France Espoirs
1st Stage 1 Kreiz Breizh Elites
2007
2nd Time trial, UEC European Under-23 Road Championships
2nd Time trial, National Road Championships
2nd Les Boucles du Sud-Ardèche
3rd Overall Kreiz Breizh Elites
3rd Paris–Troyes
5th Overall Circuit des Ardennes

1st Stage 4

5th Boucle de l'Artois
2008
1st Stage 6 (ITT) Tour de l'Avenir
3rd Overall Grand Prix du Portugal

1st Stages 2 & 3

8th Overall Circuit de la Sarthe
9th Tartu GP
2009
National Road Championships

1st Time trial
1st Road race

1st Overall Tour de l'Ain

1st Stage 5

1st Mountains classification, Tour of the Basque Country
3rd Overall Tour de Romandie
8th Overall Tour de Suisse
2010
3rd Overall Volta a Catalunya
7th Overall Paris–Nice
9th Overall Route du Sud
9th Trofeo Inca
2011
1st Time trial, National Road Championships
1st Stage 14 Vuelta a España
3rd Overall Critérium International

1st Young rider classification

4th Overall Paris–Nice

1st Young rider classification

5th Tartu GP
8th Overall Volta ao Algarve
10th Overall Circuit Cycliste Sarthe
2012
National Road Championships

1st Time trial
3rd Road race

2nd Overall Vuelta a Andalucía
3rd Overall Étoile de Bessèges
6th Tallinn–Tartu GP
8th Overall Tour du Poitou-Charentes
2013
National Road Championships

1st Road race
2nd Time trial

3rd Cholet-Pays de Loire
2014
1st Tour du Doubs
2nd Overall Tour of Turkey

1st Stage 3

6th Overall Tour du Limousin
8th Overall Étoile de Bessèges
2015
1st Overall Vuelta a Burgos

1st Stage 2 (TTT)

1st Overall Arctic Race of Norway
1st Vuelta a Murcia
2nd Road race, National Road Championships
6th Overall Volta ao Algarve
2016
1st Overall Tour of Slovenia

1st Stage 2

1st Stage 20 Giro d'Italia
2017
3rd Road race, National Road Championships
9th Overall Tour of Guangxi
2018
2nd Coppa Ugo Agostoni
2nd Tour du Gévaudan Occitanie
3rd Overall Vuelta a Aragón
3rd Overall Tour de l'Ain
3rd Tour du Doubs
4th Famenne Ardenne Classic
2019
1st Time trial, National Road Championships
2nd Overall Tour du Rwanda
3rd Overall Tour de l'Ain
3rd Overall Vuelta a Aragón
3rd Mont Ventoux Dénivelé Challenge
2020
1st Mountains classification, Tour du Rwanda
2021
1st Time trial, National Road Championships
Vuelta a España

1st Stage 3
Held after Stages 3–4
Held after Stages 3–6

3rd Overall Czech Cycling Tour
2022
1st Time trial, National Road Championships
8th Overall Tour of Oman
2023
1st Time trial, National Road Championships
4th Overall Tour of Oman
2024
1st Time trial, National Road Championships
2025
1st Time trial, National Road Championships
1st Grand Prix Ordu
3rd Overall Tour of Sharjah
4th Overall Tour of Mersin
2nd Overall Tour de Kyushu
2026
1st Overall Tour of Sharjah

=== Grand Tour general classification results timeline ===
Grand Tour	2009	2010	2011	2012	2013	2014	2015	2016	2017	2018	2019	2020	2021	2022	2023	2024
Giro d'Italia	—	—	—	—	—	—	—	29	—	—	—	—	51	46	DNF	—
Tour de France	—	DNF	11	36	102	88	DNF	—	—	DNF	66	—	—	—	—	—
Vuelta a España	74	—	DNF	—	—	—	—	DNF	147	—	—	—	55	—	DNF	DNF

Legend
—	Did not compete
DNF	Did not finish
