= 2015 in men's road cycling =

2015 in men's road cycling is about the 2015 men's bicycle races governed by the UCI.

== World Championships ==
The World Road Championships is set to be held in Richmond, Virginia, United States, from 19 to 27 September 2015.

Race	Date	Winner	Second	Third	Ref
World Championship Team Time Trial	September 20	BMC Racing Team (USA)	Etixx–Quick-Step (BEL)	Movistar Team (ESP)	
World Championship Time Trial	September 23	Vasil Kiryienka (BLR)	Adriano Malori (ITA)	Jérôme Coppel (FRA)	
World Championship Road Race	September 27	Peter Sagan (SVK)	Michael Matthews (AUS)	Ramūnas Navardauskas (LIT)	

== Grand Tours ==
Race	Date	Winner	Second	Third	Ref
(Italy) Giro d'Italia	May 9–31	Alberto Contador (ESP)	Fabio Aru (ITA)	Mikel Landa (ESP)	
Tour de France	July 4–26	Chris Froome (GBR)	Nairo Quintana (COL)	Alejandro Valverde (ESP)	
(Spain) Vuelta a España	August 22 – September 13	Fabio Aru (ITA)	Joaquim Rodríguez (ESP)	Rafał Majka (POL)	

== UCI World Tour ==
Race	Date	Winner	Second	Third	Ref
(Australia) Tour Down Under	January 20–25	Rohan Dennis (AUS)	Richie Porte (AUS)	Cadel Evans (AUS)	
(France) Paris–Nice	March 8–15	Richie Porte (AUS)	Michał Kwiatkowski (POL)	Simon Špilak (SLO)	
(Italy) Tirreno–Adriatico	March 11–17	Nairo Quintana (COL)	Bauke Mollema (NED)	Rigoberto Urán (COL)	
(Italy) Milan–San Remo	March 22	John Degenkolb (GER)	Alexander Kristoff (NOR)	Michael Matthews (AUS)	
(Spain) Volta a Catalunya	March 23–29	Richie Porte (AUS)	Alejandro Valverde (ESP)	Domenico Pozzovivo (ITA)	
(Belgium) E3 Harelbeke	March 27	Geraint Thomas (GBR)	Zdeněk Štybar (CZE)	Matteo Trentin (ITA)	
(Belgium) Gent–Wevelgem	March 29	Luca Paolini (ITA)	Niki Terpstra (NED)	Geraint Thomas (GBR)	
(Belgium) Tour of Flanders	April 5	Alexander Kristoff (NOR)	Niki Terpstra (NED)	Greg Van Avermaet (BEL)	
(Spain) Tour of the Basque Country	April 6–11	Joaquim Rodríguez (ESP)	Sergio Henao (COL)	Jon Izagirre (ESP)	
(France) Paris–Roubaix	April 12	John Degenkolb (GER)	Zdeněk Štybar (CZE)	Greg Van Avermaet (BEL)	
(Netherlands) Amstel Gold Race	April 19	Michał Kwiatkowski (POL)	Alejandro Valverde (ESP)	Michael Matthews (AUS)	
(Belgium) La Flèche Wallonne	April 22	Alejandro Valverde (ESP)	Julian Alaphilippe (FRA)	Michael Albasini (SUI)	
(Belgium) Liège–Bastogne–Liège	April 26	Alejandro Valverde (ESP)	Julian Alaphilippe (FRA)	Joaquim Rodríguez (ESP)	
(Switzerland) Tour de Romandie	April 28 – May 3	Ilnur Zakarin (RUS)	Simon Špilak (SLO)	Chris Froome (GBR)	
(Italy) Giro d'Italia	May 9–31	Alberto Contador (ESP)	Fabio Aru (ITA)	Mikel Landa (ESP)	
(France) Critérium du Dauphiné	June 7–14	Chris Froome (GBR)	Tejay van Garderen (USA)	Rui Costa (POR)	
(Switzerland) Tour de Suisse	June 13–21	Simon Špilak (SLO)	Geraint Thomas (GBR)	Tom Dumoulin (NED)	
Tour de France	July 4–26	Chris Froome (GBR)	Nairo Quintana (COL)	Alejandro Valverde (ESP)	
(Spain) Clásica de San Sebastián	August 1	Adam Yates (GBR)	Philippe Gilbert (BEL)	Alejandro Valverde (ESP)	
(Poland) Tour de Pologne	August 2–8	Jon Izagirre (ESP)	Bart De Clercq (BEL)	Ben Hermans (BEL)	
(Belgium) (Netherlands) Eneco Tour	August 10–16	Tim Wellens (BEL)	Greg Van Avermaet (BEL)	Wilco Kelderman (NED)	
(Spain) Vuelta a España	August 22 – September 13	Fabio Aru (ITA)	Joaquim Rodríguez (ESP)	Rafał Majka (POL)	
(Germany) Vattenfall Cyclassics	August 23	André Greipel (GER)	Alexander Kristoff (NOR)	Giacomo Nizzolo (ITA)	
GP Ouest-France	August 30	Alexander Kristoff (NOR)	Simone Ponzi (ITA)	Ramūnas Navardauskas (LTU)	
(Canada) GP de Québec	September 11	Rigoberto Urán (COL)	Michael Matthews (AUS)	Alexander Kristoff (NOR)	
(Canada) GP de Montréal	September 13	Tim Wellens (BEL)	Adam Yates (GBR)	Rui Costa (POR)	
(Italy) Giro di Lombardia	October 4	Vincenzo Nibali (ITA)	Daniel Moreno (ESP)	Thibaut Pinot (FRA)	

== 2.HC Category Races ==
Race	Date	Winner	Second	Third	Ref
(United Arab Emirates) Dubai Tour	February 4–7	Mark Cavendish (GBR)	John Degenkolb (GER)	Juan José Lobato (ESP)	
Tour of Qatar	February 8–13	Niki Terpstra (NED)	Maciej Bodnar (POL)	Alexander Kristoff (NOR)	
Tour of Oman	February 17–22	Rafael Valls (ESP)	Tejay van Garderen (USA)	Alejandro Valverde (ESP)	
(Malaysia) Tour de Langkawi	March 8–15	Youcef Reguigui (ALG)	Valerio Agnoli (ITA)	Sebastián Henao (COL)	
(France) Critérium International	March 28–29	Jean-Christophe Péraud (FRA)	Thibaut Pinot (FRA)	Fabio Felline (ITA)	
(Belgium) Three Days of De Panne	March 31 – April 2	Alexander Kristoff (NOR)	Stijn Devolder (BEL)	Bradley Wiggins (GBR)	
(Italy) Giro del Trentino	April 21–24	Richie Porte (AUS)	Mikel Landa (ESP)	Leopold König (CZE)	
Presidential Tour of Turkey	April 26 – May 3	Kristijan Đurasek (CRO)	Eduardo Sepúlveda (ARG)	Jay McCarthy (AUS)	
(France) Four Days of Dunkirk	May 6–10	Ignatas Konovalovas (LTU)	Bryan Coquard (FRA)	Alo Jakin (EST)	
(United States) Tour of California	May 10–17	Peter Sagan (SVK)	Julian Alaphilippe (FRA)	Sergio Henao (COL)	
(Germany) Bayern-Rundfahrt	May 13–17	Alex Dowsett (GBR)	Tiago Machado (POR)	Jan Bárta (CZE)	
Tour of Norway	May 20–24	Jesper Hansen (DEN)	Edvald Boasson Hagen (NOR)	David López (ESP)	
Tour of Belgium	May 27–31	Greg Van Avermaet (BEL)	Tiesj Benoot (BEL)	Gaëtan Bille (BEL)	
Tour de Luxembourg	June 3–7	Linus Gerdemann (GER)	Marc de Maar (NED)	Huub Duyn (NED)	
(Austria) Österreich Rundfahrt	July 5–12	Víctor de la Parte (ESP)	Ben Hermans (BEL)	Jan Hirt (CZE)	
(China) Tour of Qinghai Lake	July 5–18	Radoslav Rogina (CRO)	Hossein Alizahed (IRN)	Francisco Colorado (COL)	
(Belgium) Tour de Wallonie	July 25–29	Niki Terpstra (NED)	Victor Campenaerts (BEL)	Sergey Lagutin (RUS)	
(United States) Tour of Utah	August 3–9	Joe Dombrowski (USA)	Michael Woods (CAN)	Brent Bookwalter (USA)	
(Spain) Vuelta a Burgos	August 4–8	Rein Taaramäe (EST)	Michele Scarponi (ITA)	Daniel Moreno (ESP)	
(Denmark) Danmark Rundt	August 4–8	Christopher Juul-Jensen (DEN)	Lars Bak (DEN)	Marco Marcato (ITA)	
Arctic Race of Norway	August 13–16	Rein Taaramäe (EST)	Silvan Dillier (SUI)	Ilnur Zakarin (RUS)	
(United States) USA Pro Cycling Challenge	August 17–23	Rohan Dennis (AUS)	Brent Bookwalter (USA)	Rob Britton (CAN)	
(United Kingdom) Tour of Britain	September 6–13	Edvald Boasson Hagen (NOR)	Wouter Poels (NED)	Owain Doull (GBR)	
(China) Tour of Hainan	October 20–28	Sacha Modolo (ITA)	Andrey Zeits (KAZ)	Julien El Fares (FRA)	

== 1.HC Category Races ==
Race	Date	Winner	Second	Third	Ref
(Italy) Trofeo Laigueglia	February 19	Davide Cimolai (ITA)	Francesco Gavazzi (ITA)	Alexei Tsatevich (RUS)	
(Belgium) Omloop Het Nieuwsblad	February 28	Ian Stannard (GBR)	Niki Terpstra (NED)	Tom Boonen (BEL)	
(Switzerland) Gran Premio di Lugano	March 1	Niccolò Bonifazio (ITA)	Francesco Gavazzi (ITA)	Matteo Montaguti (ITA)	
(Italy) Strade Bianche	March 7	Zdeněk Štybar (CZE)	Greg Van Avermaet (BEL)	Alejandro Valverde (ESP)	
(Italy) Gran Premio Nobili Rubinetterie	March 19	Giacomo Nizzolo (ITA)	Simone Ponzi (ITA)	Marco Haller (AUT)	
(Belgium) Dwars door Vlaanderen	March 26	Jelle Wallays (BEL)	Edward Theuns (BEL)	Dylan van Baarle (NED)	
(Belgium) Scheldeprijs	April 8	Alexander Kristoff (NOR)	Edward Theuns (BEL)	Yauheni Hutarovich (BLR)	
(Belgium) Brabantse Pijl	April 15	Ben Hermans (BEL)	Michael Matthews (AUS)	Philippe Gilbert (BEL)	
(Switzerland) Grosser Preis des Kantons Aargau	June 11	Alexander Kristoff (NOR)	Michael Albasini (SUI)	Davide Appollonio (ITA)	
(United Kingdom) London–Surrey Classic	August 2	Jempy Drucker (LUX)	Mike Teunissen (NED)	Ben Swift (GBR)	
(Belgium) Brussels Cycling Classic	September 5	Dylan Groenewegen (NED)	Roy Jans (BEL)	Tom Boonen (BEL)	
(France) Grand Prix de Fourmies	September 6	Fabio Felline (ITA)	Tom Boonen (BEL)	Nacer Bouhanni (FRA)	
(Belgium) GP Impanis-Van Petegem	September 19	Sean De Bie (BEL)	Dimitri Claeys (BEL)	Floris Gerts (NED)	
(Italy) Tre Valli Varesine	September 30	Vincenzo Nibali (ITA)	Sergey Firsanov (RUS)	Giacomo Nizzolo (ITA)	
(Italy) Milano–Torino	October 1	Diego Rosa (ITA)	Rafał Majka (POL)	Fabio Aru (ITA)	
(Italy) Giro del Piemonte	October 2	Jan Bakelants (BEL)	Matteo Trentin (ITA)	Sonny Colbrelli (ITA)	
(Germany) Münsterland Giro	October 3	Tom Boonen (BEL)	Roy Jans (BEL)	Nikias Arndt (GER)	
(Italy) Giro dell'Emilia	October 10	Jan Bakelants (BEL)	Andrea Fedi (ITA)	Ángel Madrazo (ESP)	
(Italy) Gran Premio Bruno Beghelli	October 11	Sonny Colbrelli (ITA)	Manuel Belletti (ITA)	Roberto Ferrari (ITA)	
(France) Paris–Tours	October 11	Matteo Trentin (ITA)	Tosh Van der Sande (BEL)	Greg Van Avermaet (BEL)	
Japan Cup	October 18	Bauke Mollema (NED)	Diego Ulissi (ITA)	Yukiya Arashiro (JPN)	

== UCI tours ==
Tour	Individual champion	Individual champion's team	Team champion	Nations champion
World Tour	Alejandro Valverde (ESP)	Movistar Team	Movistar Team	Spain
UCI Africa Tour	Salah Eddine Mraouni (MAR)		Skydive Dubai Pro Cycling	Morocco
UCI America Tour	Toms Skujiņš (LAT)	Hincapie Racing	Optum-Kelly Benefit Strategies	Colombia
UCI Asia Tour	Samad Pourseyedi (IRI)	Tabriz Petrochemical Team	Pishgaman-Giant Team	Iran
UCI Europe Tour	Nacer Bouhanni (FRA)	Cofidis	Topsport Vlaanderen–Baloise	Belgium
UCI Oceania Tour	Taylor Gunman (NZL)	Avanti Racing Team	Avanti Racing Team	New Zealand

== Games ==
=== Island Games ===
Race	Winner	Second	Third
Road race	Mihkel Räim (Saaremaa)	Nathan Draper (IOM)	Torkil Veyhe (FRO)
Time trial	Torkil Veyhe (FRO)	Edvard Perry (IOM)	Nathan Draper (IOM)
Road race team	Isle of Man	Saare County	Jersey
Time trial team	Isle of Man	Jersey	Faroe Islands
Town centre criterium	Dominique (Sidney) Mayho (BER)	Nathan Draper (IOM)	Leon Mazzone (IOM)

- Cycling at the 2015 European Games
- Cycling at the 2015 Pan American Games
- Cycling at the 2015 Southeast Asian Games
- Cycling at the 2015 Military World Games

== UCI Teams ==
=== UCI WorldTeams ===
2015 UCI World Teams and equipment
Code	Official team name	Licence holder	Country	Groupset	Bicycles
ALM	AG2R La Mondiale (2015 season)	EUSRL France Cyclisme	France	SRAM	Focus
AST	Astana (2015 season)	Abacanto SA	Kazakhstan	Campagnolo	Specialized
BMC	BMC Racing Team (2015 season)	Continuum Sports LLC	United States	Shimano	BMC
TCG	Cannondale–Garmin (2015 season)	Slipstream Sports, LLC	United States	Shimano	Cannondale
EQS	Etixx–Quick-Step (2015 season)	Esperanza bvba	Belgium	Shimano	Specialized
FDJ	FDJ (2015 season)	Société de Gestion de L'Echappée	France	Shimano	Lapierre
TGA	Team Giant–Alpecin (2015 season)	SMS Cycling B.V.	Germany	Shimano	Giant
IAM	IAM Cycling (2015 season)		Switzerland	Shimano	Scott
KAT	Team Katusha (2015 season)	Katusha Management SA	Russia	Shimano	Canyon
LAM	Lampre–Merida (2015 season)	CGS Cycling Team AG	Italy	Shimano	Merida
LTS	Lotto–Soudal (2015 season)	Belgian Cycling Company sa	Belgium	Campagnolo	Ridley
TLJ	LottoNL–Jumbo (2015 season)	Rabo Wielerploegen	Netherlands	Shimano	Bianchi
MOV	Movistar Team (2015 season)	Abarca Sports S.L.	Spain	Campagnolo	Canyon
OGE	Orica–GreenEDGE (2015 season)	GreenEdge Cycling	Australia	Shimano	Scott
SKY	Team Sky (2015 season)	Tour Racing Limited	Great Britain	Shimano	Pinarello
TCS	Tinkoff–Saxo (2015 season)	Tinkoff Sport	Russia	Shimano	Specialized
TFR	Trek Factory Racing (2015 season)	Trek Bicycle Corporation	United States	Shimano	Trek
