= 2015 Trek Factory Racing season =

Trek Factory Racing
- 2015 season
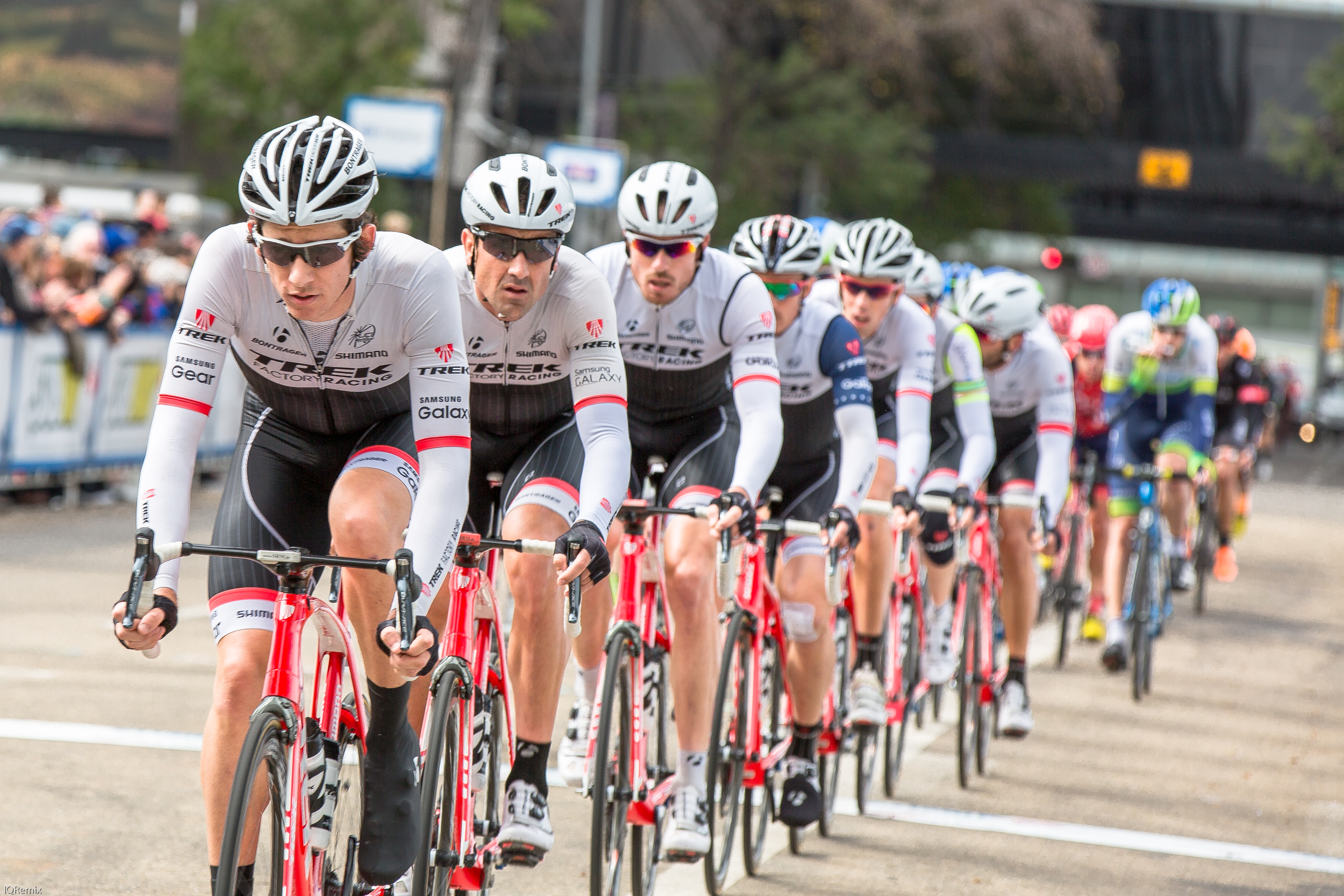
- Trek Factory on 2015 Tour of Alberta
- UCI code: TFR
- Status: UCI ProTeam
- Manager: Luca Guercilena
- Main sponsor(s): Trek Bicycle Corporation
- Based: United States
- Bicycles: Trek
- Groupset: Shimano

Season victories
- One-day races: 3
- Stage race overall: 2
- Stage race stages: 12
- National Championships: 3
- Jersey

The 2015 season for the Trek Factory Racing cycling team began in January at the Tour Down Under. As a UCI WorldTeam, they were automatically invited and obligated to send a squad to every event in the UCI World Tour.

== Team roster ==
As of 29 March 2015

Rider	Date of birth
Eugenio Alafaci (ITA)	August 9, 1990 (aged 24)
Julián Arredondo (COL)	July 30, 1988 (aged 26)
Fumiyuki Beppu (JPN)	April 10, 1983 (aged 31)
Matthew Busche (USA)	May 9, 1985 (aged 29)
Fabian Cancellara (SUI)	March 18, 1981 (aged 34)
Marco Coledan (ITA)	August 22, 1988 (aged 26)
Stijn Devolder (BEL)	August 29, 1979 (aged 35)
Laurent Didier (LUX)	July 19, 1984 (aged 30)
Fabio Felline (ITA)	March 29, 1990 (aged 25)
Markel Irizar (ESP)	February 5, 1980 (aged 35)
Bob Jungels (LUX)	September 22, 1992 (aged 22)
Daniel McConnell (AUS)	August 9, 1985 (aged 29)
Bauke Mollema (NED)	November 26, 1986 (aged 28)
Giacomo Nizzolo (ITA)	January 30, 1989 (aged 26)
Yaroslav Popovych (UKR)	January 4, 1980 (aged 35)

Rider	Date of birth
Grégory Rast (SUI)	January 17, 1980 (aged 35)
Hayden Roulston (NZL)	January 10, 1981 (aged 34)
Fränk Schleck (LUX)	April 15, 1980 (aged 34)
Jesse Sergent (NZL)	July 8, 1988 (aged 26)
Fábio Silvestre (POR)	January 25, 1990 (aged 25)
Gert Steegmans (BEL)	September 30, 1980 (aged 34)
Jasper Stuyven (BEL)	April 17, 1992 (aged 22)
Danny van Poppel (NED)	July 26, 1993 (aged 21)
Boy van Poppel (NED)	January 18, 1988 (aged 27)
Kristof Vandewalle (BEL)	April 5, 1985 (aged 29)
Calvin Watson (AUS)	January 6, 1993 (aged 22)
Riccardo Zoidl (AUT)	April 8, 1988 (aged 26)
Haimar Zubeldia (ESP)	April 1, 1977 (aged 37)

Riders who joined the team for the 2015 season

Rider	2014 team
Marco Coledan	Bardiani–CSF
Daniel McConnell	neo-pro (Trek Factory Racing MTB)
Bauke Mollema	Belkin Pro Cycling
Gert Steegmans	Omega Pharma–Quick-Step

Riders who left the team during or after the 2014 season

Rider	2015 team
Danilo Hondo	Retired
Robert Kišerlovski	Tinkoff–Saxo
Andy Schleck	Retired
Jens Voigt	Retired

== Season victories ==
Date	Race	Competition	Rider	Country	Location
8 February	Étoile de Bessèges, Stage 5	UCI Europe Tour	Bob Jungels (LUX)	France	Alès
8 February	Étoile de Bessèges, Overall	UCI Europe Tour	Bob Jungels (LUX)	France	
8 February	Étoile de Bessèges, Teams classification	UCI Europe Tour	(Note: The riders on the squad were Marco Coledan, Stijn Devolder, Fabio Felline, Bob Jungels, Giacomo Nizzolo, Fábio Silvestre, Kristof Vandewalle and Riccardo Zoidl)	France	
18 February	Tour of Oman, Stage 2	UCI Asia Tour	Fabian Cancellara (SUI)	Oman	Al-Bustan
8 March	Driedaagse van West-Vlaanderen, Stage 2	UCI Europe Tour	Danny van Poppel (NED)	Belgium	Ichtegem
17 March	Tirreno–Adriatico, Stage 7	UCI World Tour	Fabian Cancellara (SUI)	Italy	San Benedetto del Tronto
19 March	Gran Premio Nobili Rubinetterie	UCI Europe Tour	Giacomo Nizzolo (ITA)	Italy	Stresa
28 March	Critérium International, Stage 2	UCI Europe Tour	Fabio Felline (ITA)	France	Porto-Vecchio
29 March	Critérium International, Points classification	UCI Europe Tour	Fabio Felline (ITA)	France	
7 April	Tour of the Basque Country, Stage 2	UCI World Tour	Fabio Felline (ITA)	Spain	Vitoria-Gasteiz
31 May	Giro d'Italia, Points classification	UCI World Tour	Giacomo Nizzolo (ITA)	Italy	
26 July	Tour de Wallonie, Stage 2	UCI Europe Tour	Danny van Poppel (NED)	Belgium	Bassenge
29 July	Tour de Wallonie, Stage 5	UCI Europe Tour	Danny van Poppel (NED)	Belgium	Thuin
29 July	Tour de Wallonie, Points classification	UCI Europe Tour	Danny van Poppel (NED)	Belgium	
29 August	Vuelta a España, Stage 8	UCI World Tour	Jasper Stuyven (BEL)	Spain	Murcia
2 September	Tour of Alberta, Stage 1	UCI America Tour	Team time trial (Note: The riders on the squad were Matthew Busche, Bauke Mollema, Grégory Rast, Jesse Sergent, Kristof Vandewalle, Laurent Didier, Hayden Roulston and Marco Coledan.)	Canada	Grande Prairie
3 September	Vuelta a España, Stage 12	UCI World Tour	Danny van Poppel (NED)	Spain	Lleida
6 September	Grand Prix de Fourmies	UCI Europe Tour	Fabio Felline (ITA)	France	Fourmies
7 September	Vuelta a España, Stage 16	UCI World Tour	Frank Schleck (LUX)	Spain	Quirós
7 September	Tour of Alberta, Overall	UCI America Tour	Bauke Mollema (NED)	Canada	
18 October	Japan Cup	UCI Asia Tour	Bauke Mollema (NED)	Japan	Utsunomiya

== National, Continental and World champions 2015 ==
Date	Discipline	Jersey	Rider	Country	Location
25 May	United States National Road Race Champion		Matthew Busche (USA)	United States	Chattanooga
25 June	Luxembourgish National Time Trial Champion		Bob Jungels (LUX)	Luxembourg	Eschweiler
28 June	Luxembourgish National Road Race Champion		Bob Jungels (LUX)	Luxembourg	Wiltz
