= 2015 Cannondale–Garmin season =

Cannondale-Garmin
- 2015 season
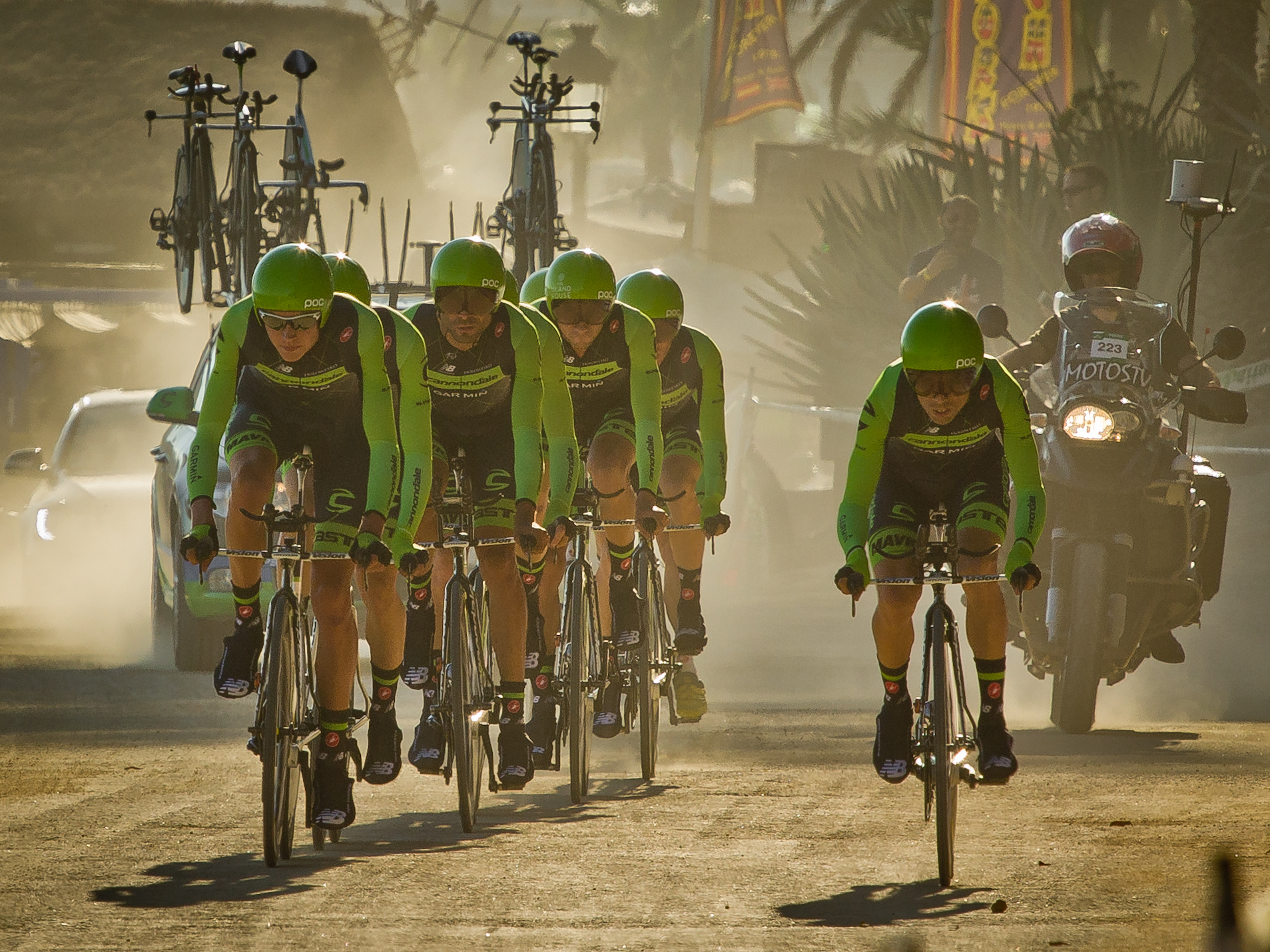
- Tour of Spain TTT
- UCI code: TCG
- Status: UCI ProTeam
- Manager: Jonathan Vaughters
- Main sponsor(s): Cannondale & Garmin
- Based: Boulder, Colorado, United States
- Bicycles: Cannondale
- Groupset: Shimano

Season victories
- One-day races: -
- Stage race overall: 2
- Stage race stages: 7
- National Championships: 2

The 2015 season for the Cannondale–Garmin cycling team began in January at the Tour de San Luis. As a UCI WorldTeam, they are obligated to send a squad to every event in the UCI World Tour.

After months of speculation, Garmin-Sharp and Cannondale announced on 20 August 2014 that for the 2015 season the two teams will merge. The team is more a continuity of the Garmin team managed by Slipstream Sports, who will remain the managerial organisation behind the team, with Cannondale becoming the team's title sponsor and bike supplier, and Garmin remaining a key team sponsor.

== Team roster ==
As of January 11, 2015

Rider	Date of birth
Janier Acevedo (COL)	December 6, 1985 (aged 29)
Jack Bauer (NZL)	April 7, 1985 (aged 29)
Alberto Bettiol (ITA)	October 23, 1993 (aged 21)
Nate Brown (USA)	July 6, 1991 (aged 23)
André Cardoso (POR)	September 3, 1984 (aged 30)
Tom Danielson (USA)	March 13, 1978 (aged 36)
Joe Dombrowski (USA)	May 12, 1991 (aged 23)
Davide Formolo (ITA)	October 25, 1992 (aged 22)
Nathan Haas (AUS)	March 12, 1989 (aged 25)
Ryder Hesjedal (CAN)	December 9, 1980 (aged 34)
Alex Howes (USA)	January 1, 1988 (aged 27)
Ben King (USA)	March 22, 1989 (aged 25)
Ted King (USA)	January 31, 1983 (aged 31)
Kristijan Koren (SLO)	November 25, 1986 (aged 28)

Rider	Date of birth
Sebastian Langeveld (NED)	January 17, 1985 (aged 29)
Alan Marangoni (ITA)	July 16, 1984 (aged 30)
Dan Martin (IRE)	August 20, 1986 (aged 28)
Matej Mohorič (SLO)	October 19, 1994 (aged 20)
Moreno Moser (ITA)	December 25, 1990 (aged 24)
Ramūnas Navardauskas (LTU)	January 30, 1988 (aged 26)
Lasse Norman Hansen (DEN)	February 11, 1992 (aged 22)
Kristoffer Skjerping (NOR)	May 4, 1993 (aged 21)
Tom-Jelte Slagter (NED)	July 1, 1989 (aged 25)
Andrew Talansky (USA)	November 23, 1988 (aged 26)
Rigoberto Urán (COL)	January 26, 1987 (aged 27)
Dylan van Baarle (NED)	May 22, 1993 (aged 21)
Davide Villella (ITA)	June 27, 1991 (aged 23)
Ruben Zepuntke (GER)	January 29, 1993 (aged 21)

Riders who joined the team for the 2015 season

Rider	2014 team
Alberto Bettiol	Cannondale
Joe Dombrowski	Team Sky
Davide Formolo	Cannondale
Ted King	Cannondale
Kristijan Koren	Cannondale
Alan Marangoni	Cannondale
Matej Mohorič	Cannondale
Moreno Moser	Cannondale
Kristoffer Skjerping	neo-pro (Team Joker)
Davide Villella	Cannondale
Ruben Zepuntke	neo-pro (Bissell Development Team)

Riders who left the team during or after the 2014 season

Rider	2015 team
Thomas Dekker	Retired
Rohan Dennis	BMC Racing Team
Caleb Fairly	Team Giant–Alpecin
Tyler Farrar	MTN–Qhubeka
Koldo Fernández	Retired
Phil Gaimon	Optum-Kelly Benefit Strategies
Raymond Kreder	Roompot Orange Cycling
David Millar	Retired
Lachlan Morton	Jelly Belly-Maxxis
Nick Nuyens	Retired
Johan Vansummeren	AG2R La Mondiale
Steele Von Hoff	NFTO Pro Cycling
Fabian Wegmann	Cult Energy Pro Cycling

== Season victories ==
Date	Race	Competition	Rider	Country	Location
February 22	Volta ao Algarve, Young rider classification	UCI Europe Tour	Davide Formolo (ITA)	Portugal	
March 28	Critérium International, Stage 1	UCI Europe Tour	Ben King (USA)	France	Porto-Vecchio
March 29	Volta a Catalunya, Mountains classification	UCI World Tour	Tom Danielson (USA)	Spain	
April 10	Circuit de la Sarthe, Overall	UCI Europe Tour	Ramūnas Navardauskas (LTU)	France	
April 10	Circuit de la Sarthe, Teams classification	UCI Europe Tour	(Note: The riders on the squad were: Alberto Bettiol, Nathan Haas, Alex Howes, Ben King, Moreno Moser and Ramūnas Navardauskas.)	France	
May 12	Giro d'Italia, Stage 4	UCI World Tour	Davide Formolo (ITA)	Italy	La Spezia
May 17	Bayern–Rundfahrt, Young rider classification	UCI Europe Tour	Dylan van Baarle (NED)	Germany	
May 17	Bayern–Rundfahrt, Teams classification	UCI Europe Tour	(Note: The riders on the squad were: Jack Bauer, Alberto Bettiol, Kristijan Koren, Matej Mohorič, Moreno Moser, Ramūnas Navardauskas and Dylan van Baarle.)	Germany	
July 12	Tour of Austria, Stage 8	UCI Europe Tour	Moreno Moser (ITA)	Austria	Bregenz
August 8	Tour of Utah, Stage 6	UCI America Tour	Joe Dombrowski (USA)	United States	Snowbird
August 9	Tour of Utah, Overall	UCI America Tour	Joe Dombrowski (USA)	United States	
September 4	Tour of Alberta, Stage 3	UCI America Tour	Tom-Jelte Slagter (NED)	Canada	Miette Hot Springs
September 5	Tour of Alberta, Stage 4	UCI America Tour	Tom-Jelte Slagter (NED)	Canada	Marmot Basin
September 6	Tour of Alberta, Stage 5	UCI America Tour	Lasse Norman Hansen (DEN)	Canada	Spruce Grove
September 7	Tour of Alberta, Teams classification	UCI America Tour	(Note: The riders on the squad were: Ryder Hesjedal, Nathan Brown, Jasper Bovenhuis, Davide Formolo, Lasse Norman Hansen, Ted King, Kristoffer Skjerping and Tom-Jelte Slagter.)	Canada	
September 13	Tour of Britain, Teams classification	UCI Europe Tour	(Note: The riders on the squad were: Dylan van Baarle, Alberto Bettiol, Sebastian Langeveld, Alan Marangoni, Ryan Mullen and Ruben Zepuntke.)	United Kingdom	

== National, Continental and World champions 2015 ==
Date	Discipline	Jersey	Rider	Country	Location
May 23	United States National Time Trial Championships		Andrew Talansky (USA)	United States	Chattanooga
June 26	Lithuanian National Time Trial Championships		Ramūnas Navardauskas (LTU)	Lithuania	Ignalina
