= 2015 Movistar Team season =

Movistar Team
- 2015 season
- UCI code: MOV
- Status: UCI ProTeam
- Manager: Eusebio Unzué
- Main sponsor(s): Telefónica
- Based: Spain
- Bicycles: Canyon
- Groupset: Campagnolo

Season victories
- One-day races: 4
- Stage race overall: 4
- Stage race stages: 19
- National Championships: 4

The 2015 season for Movistar Team began in January at the Tour de San Luis. As a UCI WorldTeam, they were automatically invited and obligated to send a squad to every event in the UCI World Tour.

== Team roster ==
As of 1 January 2015

Rider	Date of birth
Andrey Amador (CRC)	29 August 1986 (aged 28)
Winner Anacona (COL)	11 September 1988 (aged 26)
Igor Antón (ESP)	2 March 1983 (aged 31)
Eros Capecchi (ITA)	13 June 1986 (aged 28)
Jonathan Castroviejo (ESP)	27 April 1987 (aged 27)
Alex Dowsett (GBR)	3 October 1988 (aged 26)
Imanol Erviti (ESP)	15 November 1983 (aged 31)
Rubén Fernández (ESP)	1 March 1991 (aged 23)
John Gadret (FRA)	22 April 1979 (aged 35)
Jesús Herrada (ESP)	26 July 1990 (aged 24)
José Herrada (ESP)	1 October 1985 (aged 29)
Beñat Intxausti (ESP)	20 March 1986 (aged 28)
Gorka Izagirre (ESP)	7 October 1987 (aged 27)
Ion Izagirre (ESP)	4 February 1989 (aged 25)

Rider	Date of birth
Pablo Lastras (ESP)	20 January 1976 (aged 38)
Juan José Lobato (ESP)	28 December 1988 (aged 26)
Adriano Malori (ITA)	28 January 1988 (aged 26)
Javier Moreno (ESP)	18 July 1984 (aged 30)
Dayer Quintana (COL)	10 August 1992 (aged 22)
Nairo Quintana (COL)	4 February 1990 (aged 24)
José Joaquín Rojas (ESP)	8 June 1985 (aged 29)
Enrique Sanz (ESP)	11 September 1989 (aged 25)
Marc Soler (ESP)	22 November 1993 (aged 21)
Rory Sutherland (AUS)	8 February 1982 (aged 32)
Jasha Sütterlin (GER)	4 November 1992 (aged 22)
Alejandro Valverde (ESP)	25 April 1980 (aged 34)
Francisco Ventoso (ESP)	6 May 1982 (aged 32)
Giovanni Visconti (ITA)	13 January 1983 (aged 31)

Riders who joined the team for the 2015 season

Rider	2014 team
Winner Anacona	Lampre–Merida
Rubén Fernández	Caja Rural–Seguros RGA
Marc Soler	neo-pro (Lizarte)
Rory Sutherland	Tinkoff–Saxo

Riders who left the team during or after the 2014 season

Rider	2015 team
Iván Gutiérrez	Retired
Rubén Plaza	Lampre–Merida
Sylwester Szmyd	CCC–Polsat–Polkowice

== Season victories ==
Date	Race	Competition	Rider	Country	Location
21 January	Tour Down Under, Stage 2	UCI World Tour	Juan José Lobato (ESP)	Australia	Stirling
23 January	Tour de San Luis, Stage 5	UCI America Tour	Adriano Malori (ITA)	Argentina	San Luis
25 January	Tour Down Under, Teams classification	UCI World Tour	(Note: The riders on the squad were Eros Capecchi, Rubén Fernández, Gorka Izagirre, Pablo Lastras, Juan José Lobato, José Herrada and Enrique Sanz)	Australia	
31 January	Trofeo Serra de Tramuntana	UCI Europe Tour	Alejandro Valverde (ESP)	Spain	Deià
8 February	Tour of Qatar, Stage 1	UCI Asia Tour	José Joaquín Rojas (ESP)	Qatar	Sealine Beach Resort
18 February	Vuelta a Andalucía, Stage 1b	UCI Europe Tour	Javier Moreno (ESP)	Spain	Coria del Río
19 February	Vuelta a Andalucía, Stage 2	UCI Europe Tour	Juan José Lobato (ESP)	Spain	Lucena
22 February	Vuelta a Andalucía, Stage 5	UCI Europe Tour	Juan José Lobato (ESP)	Spain	Alhaurín de la Torre
11 March	Tirreno–Adriatico, Stage 1	UCI World Tour	Adriano Malori (ITA)	Italy	Lido di Camaiore
15 March	Tirreno–Adriatico, Stage 5	UCI World Tour	Nairo Quintana (COL)	Italy	Terminillo
17 March	Tirreno–Adriatico, Overall	UCI World Tour	Nairo Quintana (COL)	Italy	
17 March	Tirreno–Adriatico, Young rider classification	UCI World Tour	Nairo Quintana (COL)	Italy	
17 March	Tirreno–Adriatico, Teams classification	UCI World Tour	(Note: The riders on the squad were Nairo Quintana, Andrey Amador, Jonathan Castroviejo, Jesús Herrada, Adriano Malori, Javier Moreno, Francisco Ventoso and Giovanni Visconti)	Italy	
24 March	Volta a Catalunya, Stage 2	UCI World Tour	Alejandro Valverde (ESP)	Spain	Olot
27 March	Volta a Catalunya, Stage 5	UCI World Tour	Alejandro Valverde (ESP)	Spain	Valls
29 March	Volta a Catalunya, Stage 7	UCI World Tour	Alejandro Valverde (ESP)	Spain	Barcelona
8 April	Circuit de la Sarthe, Stage 2b	UCI Europe Tour	Adriano Malori (ITA)	France	Angers
12 April	Klasika Primavera	UCI Europe Tour	José Herrada (ESP)	Spain	Amorebieta
19 April	Vuelta a Castilla y León, Spanish rider classification	UCI Europe Tour	Beñat Intxausti (ESP)	Spain	
19 April	Vuelta a Castilla y León, Teams classification	UCI Europe Tour	(Note: The riders on the squad were Igor Antón, Winner Anacona, Beñat Intxausti, Jonathan Castroviejo, Javier Moreno, Enrique Sanz and Marc Soler)	Spain	
22 April	La Flèche Wallonne	UCI World Tour	Alejandro Valverde (ESP)	Belgium	Huy
26 April	Liège–Bastogne–Liège	UCI World Tour	Alejandro Valverde (ESP)	Belgium	Ans
2 May	Vuelta a Asturias, Stage 1	UCI Europe Tour	Igor Antón (ESP)	Spain	Pola de Lena
3 May	Vuelta a Asturias, Stage 2	UCI Europe Tour	Jesús Herrada (ESP)	Spain	Oviedo
3 May	Vuelta a Asturias, Overall	UCI Europe Tour	Igor Antón (ESP)	Spain	
3 May	Vuelta a Asturias, Points classification	UCI Europe Tour	Jesús Herrada (ESP)	Spain	
3 May	Vuelta a Asturias, Teams classification	UCI Europe Tour	(Note: The riders on the squad were Igor Antón, Javier Moreno, José Herrada, Jesús Herrada, Rubén Fernández, Ion Izagirre, Enrique Sanz and Marc Soler)	Spain	
16 May	Giro d'Italia, Stage 8	UCI World Tour	Beñat Intxausti (ESP)	Italy	Campitello Matese
16 May	Bayern–Rundfahrt, Stage 4	UCI Europe Tour	Alex Dowsett (GBR)	Germany	Haßfurt
17 May	Bayern–Rundfahrt, Overall	UCI Europe Tour	Alex Dowsett (GBR)	Germany	
31 May	Giro d'Italia, Mountains classification	UCI World Tour	Giovanni Visconti (ITA)	Italy	
14 June	Critérium du Dauphiné, Teams classification	UCI World Tour	(Note: The riders on the squad were Alejandro Valverde, Jonathan Castroviejo, Alex Dowsett, John Gadret, José Herrada, Beñat Intxausti, Gorka Izagirre and Rory Sutherland)	France	
26 July	Tour de France, Young rider classification	UCI World Tour	Nairo Quintana (COL)	France	
26 July	Tour de France, Teams classification	UCI World Tour	(Note: The riders on the squad were Nairo Quintana, Winner Anacona, Jonathan Castroviejo, Alex Dowsett, Imanol Erviti, José Herrada, Gorka Izagirre, Adriano Malori and Alejandro Valverde)	France	
8 August	Tour de Pologne, Overall	UCI World Tour	Ion Izagirre (ESP)	Poland	
19 August	Tour du Limousin, Stage 2	UCI Europe Tour	José Herrada (ESP)	France	Lissac-sur-Couze
25 August	Vuelta a España, Stage 4	UCI World Tour	Alejandro Valverde (ESP)	Spain	Vejer de la Frontera
27 August	Tour du Poitou-Charentes, Stage 4	UCI Europe Tour	Adriano Malori (ITA)	France	Loudun
28 August	Tour du Poitou-Charentes, Teams classification	UCI Europe Tour	(Note: The riders on the squad were Alex Dowsett, Jonathan Castroviejo, John Gadret, José Herrada, Enrique Sanz, Adriano Malori and Jasha Sütterlin)	France	
13 September	Vuelta a España, Points classification	UCI World Tour	Alejandro Valverde (ESP)	Spain	
13 September	Vuelta a España, Team classification	UCI World Tour	(Note: The riders on the squad were Alejandro Valverde, Andrey Amador, Imanol Erviti, Javier Moreno, Nairo Quintana, José Joaquín Rojas, Rory Sutherland, Francisco Ventoso and Giovanni Visconti)	Spain	

== National, Continental and World champions 2015 ==
Date	Discipline	Jersey	Rider	Country	Location
24 June	Italian National Time Trial Champion		Adriano Malori (ITA)	Italy	Bogogno
25 June	British National Time Trial Champion		Alex Dowsett (GBR)	United Kingdom	Cadwell Park
26 June	Spanish National Time Trial Champion		Jonathan Castroviejo (ESP)	Spain	Cáceres
28 June	Spanish National Road Race Champion		Alejandro Valverde (ESP)	Spain	Cáceres
