= 2015 Etixx–Quick-Step season =

Etixx–Quick-Step
- 2015 season
- UCI code: EQS
- Status: UCI ProTeam
- Manager: Patrick Lefevere
- Main sponsor(s): Etixx & Quick Step
- Based: Belgium
- Bicycles: Specialized
- Groupset: Shimano

Season victories
- One-day races: 12
- Stage race overall: 6
- Stage race stages: 30
- National Championships: 4

The 2015 season for Etixx–Quick-Step began in January at the Tour de San Luis. As a UCI WorldTeam, they were automatically invited and obliged to send a squad to every event in the UCI World Tour.

== Team roster ==
As of 1 January 2015

Rider	Date of birth
Julian Alaphilippe (FRA)	11 June 1992 (aged 22)
Tom Boonen (BEL)	15 October 1980 (aged 34)
Maxime Bouet (FRA)	3 November 1986 (aged 28)
Gianluca Brambilla (ITA)	22 August 1987 (aged 27)
Mark Cavendish (GBR)	21 May 1985 (aged 29)
David de la Cruz (ESP)	6 May 1989 (aged 25)
Michał Gołaś (POL)	29 September 1984 (aged 30)
Iljo Keisse (BEL)	21 December 1982 (aged 32)
Michał Kwiatkowski (POL)	2 June 1990 (aged 24)
Yves Lampaert (BEL)	10 April 1991 (aged 23)
Nikolas Maes (BEL)	9 April 1986 (aged 28)
Tony Martin (GER)	23 April 1985 (aged 29)
Gianni Meersman (BEL)	5 December 1985 (aged 29)
Mark Renshaw (AUS)	22 October 1982 (aged 32)

Rider	Date of birth
Fabio Sabatini (ITA)	10 February 1985 (aged 29)
Pieter Serry (BEL)	21 November 1988 (aged 26)
Zdeněk Štybar (CZE)	11 December 1985 (aged 29)
Niki Terpstra (NED)	18 May 1984 (aged 30)
Matteo Trentin (ITA)	2 August 1989 (aged 25)
Rigoberto Urán (COL)	26 January 1987 (aged 27)
Petr Vakoč (CZE)	11 July 1992 (aged 22)
Guillaume Van Keirsbulck (BEL)	14 February 1991 (aged 23)
Stijn Vandenbergh (BEL)	25 April 1984 (aged 30)
Martin Velits (SVK)	21 February 1985 (aged 29)
Julien Vermote (BEL)	26 July 1989 (aged 25)
Carlos Verona (ESP)	4 November 1992 (aged 22)
Łukasz Wiśniowski (POL)	7 December 1991 (aged 23)

Riders who joined the team for the 2015 season

Rider	2014 team
Łukasz Wiśniowski	Etixx
Yves Lampaert	Topsport Vlaanderen–Baloise
Fabio Sabatini	Cannondale
Maxime Bouet	Ag2r–La Mondiale
David de la Cruz	NetApp–Endura

Riders who left the team during or after the 2014 season

Rider	2015 team
Andrew Fenn	Team Sky
Serge Pauwels	MTN–Qhubeka
Thomas De Gendt	Lotto–Soudal
Wout Poels	Team Sky
Alessandro Petacchi	Southeast Pro Cycling
Jan Bakelants	AG2R La Mondiale
Kevin De Weert	Lotto–Soudal
Gert Steegmans	Trek Factory Racing

== Season victories ==
Date	Race	Competition	Rider	Country	Location
25 January	Tour de San Luis, Stage 7	UCI America Tour	Mark Cavendish (GBR)	Argentina	San Luis
1 February	Cadel Evans Great Ocean Road Race	UCI Oceania Tour	Gianni Meersman (BEL)	Australia	Geelong
4 February	Dubai Tour, Stage 1	UCI Asia Tour	Mark Cavendish (GBR)	United Arab Emirates	Dubai
7 February	Dubai Tour, Stage 4	UCI Asia Tour	Mark Cavendish (GBR)	United Arab Emirates	Dubai
7 February	Dubai Tour, Overall	UCI Asia Tour	Mark Cavendish (GBR)	United Arab Emirates	
7 February	Dubai Tour, Points classification	UCI Asia Tour	Mark Cavendish (GBR)	United Arab Emirates	
10 February	Tour of Qatar, Stage 3	UCI Asia Tour	Niki Terpstra (NED)	Qatar	Lusail
13 February	Tour of Qatar, Overall	UCI Asia Tour	Niki Terpstra (NED)	Qatar	
13 February	Tour of Qatar, Teams classification	UCI Asia Tour	(Note: The riders on the squad were Niki Terpstra, Tom Boonen, Iljo Keisse, Nikolas Maes, Matteo Trentin, Guillaume Van Keirsbulck, Stijn Vandenbergh and Martin Velits)	Qatar	
15 February	Clásica de Almería	UCI Europe Tour	Mark Cavendish (GBR)	Spain	Almería
18 February	Volta ao Algarve, Stage 1	UCI Europe Tour	Gianni Meersman (BEL)	Portugal	Albufeira
20 February	Volta ao Algarve, Stage 3	UCI Europe Tour	Tony Martin (GER)	Portugal	Cabo de São Vicente
1 March	Kuurne–Brussels–Kuurne	UCI Europe Tour	Mark Cavendish (GBR)	Belgium	Kuurne
7 March	Strade Bianche	UCI Europe Tour	Zdeněk Štybar (CZE)	Italy	Siena
7 March	Driedaagse van West-Vlaanderen, Stage 1	UCI Europe Tour	Yves Lampaert (BEL)	Belgium	Harelbeke
8 March	Paris–Nice, Prologue	UCI World Tour	Michał Kwiatkowski (POL)	France	Maurepas
8 March	Driedaagse van West-Vlaanderen, Overall	UCI Europe Tour	Yves Lampaert (BEL)	Belgium	
8 March	Driedaagse van West-Vlaanderen, Points classification	UCI Europe Tour	Yves Lampaert (BEL)	Belgium	
8 March	Driedaagse van West-Vlaanderen, Young rider classification	UCI Europe Tour	Yves Lampaert (BEL)	Belgium	
8 March	Driedaagse van West-Vlaanderen, West Flanders classification	UCI Europe Tour	Yves Lampaert (BEL)	Belgium	
8 March	Driedaagse van West-Vlaanderen, Teams classification	UCI Europe Tour	(Note: The riders on the squad were Iljo Keisse, Yves Lampaert, Gianni Meersman, Petr Vakoč, Guillaume Van Keirsbulck, Martin Velits and Łukasz Wiśniowski)	Belgium	
15 March	Paris–Nice, Young rider classification	UCI World Tour	Michał Kwiatkowski (POL)	France	
20 March	Handzame Classic	UCI Europe Tour	Gianni Meersman (BEL)	Belgium	Handzame
21 March	Ronde van Zeeland Seaports	UCI Europe Tour	Iljo Keisse (BEL)	Netherlands	Terneuzen
19 April	Amstel Gold Race	UCI World Tour	Michał Kwiatkowski (POL)	Netherlands	Berg en Terblijt
26 April	Tour of Turkey, Stage 1	UCI Europe Tour	Mark Cavendish (GBR)	Turkey	Alanya
27 April	Tour of Turkey, Stage 2	UCI Europe Tour	Mark Cavendish (GBR)	Turkey	Antalya
2 May	Tour of Turkey, Stage 7	UCI Europe Tour	Mark Cavendish (GBR)	Turkey	İzmir
3 May	Tour of Turkey, Points classification	UCI Europe Tour	Mark Cavendish (GBR)	Turkey	
3 May	Tour de Romandie, Stage 6	UCI World Tour	Tony Martin (GER)	Switzerland	Lausanne
10 May	Tour of California, Stage 1	UCI America Tour	Mark Cavendish (GBR)	United States	Sacramento
11 May	Tour of California, Stage 2	UCI America Tour	Mark Cavendish (GBR)	United States	Lodi
14 May	Tour of California, Stage 5	UCI America Tour	Mark Cavendish (GBR)	United States	Santa Clarita
16 May	Tour of California, Stage 7	UCI America Tour	Julian Alaphilippe (FRA)	United States	Mount Baldy
17 May	Tour of California, Stage 8	UCI America Tour	Mark Cavendish (GBR)	United States	Pasadena
17 May	Tour of California, Sprints classification	UCI America Tour	Mark Cavendish (GBR)	United States	
17 May	Tour of California, Young rider classification	UCI America Tour	Julian Alaphilippe (FRA)	United States	
28 May	Tour of Belgium, Stage 1	UCI Europe Tour	Tom Boonen (BEL)	Belgium	Knokke-Heist
31 May	Tour of Belgium, Points classification	UCI Europe Tour	Tom Boonen (BEL)	Belgium	
31 May	Giro d'Italia, Stage 21	UCI World Tour	Iljo Keisse (BEL)	Italy	Milan
14 June	Rund um Köln	UCI Europe Tour	Tom Boonen (BEL)	Germany	Cologne
7 July	Tour de France, Stage 4	UCI World Tour	Tony Martin (GER)	France	Cambrai
9 July	Tour de France, Stage 6	UCI World Tour	Zdeněk Štybar (CZE)	France	Le Havre
10 July	Tour de France, Stage 7	UCI World Tour	Mark Cavendish (GBR)	France	Fougères
25 July	Tour de Wallonie, Stage 1	UCI Europe Tour	Niki Terpstra (NED)	Belgium	Hannut
29 July	Tour de Wallonie, Overall	UCI Europe Tour	Niki Terpstra (NED)	Belgium	
12 August	Eneco Tour, Stage 3	UCI World Tour	Tom Boonen (BEL)	Belgium	Ardooie
13 August	Czech Cycling Tour, Stage 1	UCI Europe Tour	Team time trial (Note: The riders on the squad were Fernando Gaviria, Iljo Keisse, Zdeněk Štybar, Petr Vakoč, Łukasz Wiśniowski, Peter Serry and Rodrigo Contreras.)	Czech Republic	Uničov
14 August	Czech Cycling Tour, Stage 2	UCI Europe Tour	Fernando Gaviria (COL) (Note: Gaviria was riding for the team as a stagiaire)	Czech Republic	Uničov
16 August	Czech Cycling Tour, Stage 4	UCI Europe Tour	Zdeněk Štybar (CZE)	Czech Republic	Dolany
16 August	Czech Cycling Tour, Overall	UCI Europe Tour	Petr Vakoč (CZE)	Czech Republic	
16 August	Czech Cycling Tour, Points classification	UCI Europe Tour	Zdeněk Štybar (CZE)	Czech Republic	
16 August	Czech Cycling Tour, Teams classification	UCI Europe Tour	(Note: The riders on the squad were Rodrigo Contreras, Fernando Gaviria, Iljo Keisse, Pieter Serry, Zdeněk Štybar, Petr Vakoč and Łukasz Wiśniowski)	Czech Republic	
26 August	Tour du Poitou-Charentes, Stage 2	UCI Europe Tour	Matteo Trentin (ITA)	France	La Crèche
28 August	Tour du Poitou-Charentes, Stage 5	UCI Europe Tour	Matteo Trentin (ITA)	France	Poitiers
28 August	Tour du Poitou-Charentes, Overall	UCI Europe Tour	Tony Martin (GER)	France	
28 August	Tour du Poitou-Charentes, Points classification	UCI Europe Tour	Matteo Trentin (ITA)	France	
28 August	Tour du Poitou-Charentes, Young rider classification	UCI Europe Tour	Petr Vakoč (CZE)	France	
7 September	Tour of Britain, Stage 2	UCI Europe Tour	Petr Vakoč (CZE)	United Kingdom	Colne
9 September	Tour of Britain, Stage 4	UCI Europe Tour	Fernando Gaviria (COL)	United Kingdom	Blyth
11 September	Tour of Britain, Stage 6	UCI Europe Tour	Matteo Trentin (ITA)	United Kingdom	Nottingham
11 September	Grand Prix Cycliste de Québec	UCI World Tour	Rigoberto Urán (COL)	Canada	Quebec City
18 September	Kampioenschap van Vlaanderen	UCI Europe Tour	Michał Gołaś (POL)	Belgium	Koolskamp
3 October	Münsterland Giro	UCI Europe Tour	Tom Boonen (BEL)	Germany	Münster
11 October	Paris–Tours	UCI Europe Tour	Matteo Trentin (ITA)	France	Tours

== National, Continental and World champions 2015 ==
Date	Discipline	Jersey	Rider	Country	Location
7 February	Colombian National Time Trial Champion		Rigoberto Urán (COL)	Colombia	Mall Llanogrande
26 June	German National Time Trial Champion		Tony Martin (GER)	Germany	Einhausen
28 June	Czech National Road Race Champion		Petr Vakoč (CZE)	Slovakia (Note: The championships alternate each year between the Czech Republic and Slovakia.)	Žilina
28 June	Dutch National Road Race Champion		Niki Terpstra (NED)	Netherlands	Emmen
