= 2015 BMC Racing Team season =

BMC Racing Team
- 2015 season
- UCI code: BMC
- Status: UCI ProTeam
- Manager: Jim Ochowicz
- Main sponsor(s): BMC Switzerland
- Based: United States
- Bicycles: BMC
- Groupset: Shimano

Season victories
- One-day races: 4
- Stage race overall: 3
- Stage race stages: 23
- National Championships: 2

The 2015 season for the BMC Racing Team began in January with the Tour Down Under. As a UCI WorldTeam, they were automatically invited and obligated to send a squad to every event in the UCI World Tour.

== Team roster ==
As of January 1, 2015

Rider	Date of birth
Darwin Atapuma (COL)	January 15, 1988 (aged 26)
Brent Bookwalter (USA)	February 16, 1984 (aged 30)
Marcus Burghardt (GER)	June 30, 1983 (aged 31)
Damiano Caruso (ITA)	August 12, 1987 (aged 27)
Alessandro De Marchi (ITA)	May 19, 1986 (aged 28)
Rohan Dennis (AUS)	May 28, 1990 (aged 24)
Silvan Dillier (SUI)	August 3, 1990 (aged 24)
Jempy Drucker (LUX)	September 3, 1986 (aged 28)
Cadel Evans (Note: Evans retired from cycling on February 1.) (AUS)	February 14, 1977 (aged 37)
Campbell Flakemore (AUS)	August 6, 1992 (aged 22)
Philippe Gilbert (BEL)	July 5, 1982 (aged 32)
Ben Hermans (BEL)	June 8, 1986 (aged 28)
Stefan Küng (SUI)	November 16, 1993 (aged 21)
Klaas Lodewyck (BEL)	March 24, 1988 (aged 26)
Amaël Moinard (FRA)	February 2, 1982 (aged 32)

Rider	Date of birth
Daniel Oss (ITA)	January 13, 1987 (aged 27)
Taylor Phinney (USA)	June 27, 1990 (aged 24)
Manuel Quinziato (ITA)	October 30, 1979 (aged 35)
Joey Rosskopf (USA)	September 5, 1989 (aged 25)
Samuel Sánchez (ESP)	February 5, 1978 (aged 36)
Michael Schär (SUI)	September 29, 1986 (aged 28)
Manuel Senni (ITA)	March 11, 1992 (aged 22)
Peter Stetina (USA)	August 8, 1987 (aged 27)
Dylan Teuns (BEL)	March 1, 1992 (aged 22)
Greg Van Avermaet (BEL)	May 17, 1985 (aged 29)
Tejay van Garderen (USA)	August 12, 1988 (aged 26)
Peter Velits (SVK)	August 12, 1985 (aged 29)
Loïc Vliegen (Note: Vliegen joined the team on July 1.) (BEL)	December 20, 1993 (aged 21)
Danilo Wyss (SUI)	August 26, 1985 (aged 29)
Rick Zabel (GER)	December 7, 1993 (aged 21)

Riders who joined the team for the 2015 season

Rider	2014 team
Damiano Caruso	Cannondale
Alessandro De Marchi	Cannondale
Jempy Drucker	Wanty–Groupe Gobert
Campbell Flakemore	neo-pro (Avanti Racing Team)
Stefan Küng	neo-pro (BMC Development Team)
Joey Rosskopf	Hincapie Sportswear Development Team
Manuel Senni	neo-pro (Colpack)
Dylan Teuns	neo-pro (BMC Development Team)

Riders who left the team during or after the 2014 season

Rider	2015 team
Steve Cummings	MTN–Qhubeka
Yannick Eijssen	Wanty–Groupe Gobert
Thor Hushovd	Retired
Martin Kohler	Drapac Professional Cycling
Sebastian Lander	TreFor-Blue Water
Steve Morabito	FDJ
Dominik Nerz	Bora–Argon 18
Larry Warbasse	IAM Cycling

== Season victories ==
Date	Race	Competition	Rider	Country	Location
January 22	Tour Down Under, Stage 3	UCI World Tour	Rohan Dennis (AUS)	Australia	Paracombe
January 25	Tour Down Under, Overall	UCI World Tour	Rohan Dennis (AUS)	Australia	
January 25	Tour Down Under, Young rider classification	UCI World Tour	Rohan Dennis (AUS)	Australia	
February 7	Dubai Tour, Teams classification	UCI Asia Tour	(Note: The riders on the squad were Philippe Gilbert, Brent Bookwalter, Marcus Burghardt, Stefan Küng, Klaas Lodewyck, Daniel Oss, Manuel Quinziato and Rick Zabel)	United Arab Emirates	
February 22	Tour of Oman, Teams classification	UCI Asia Tour	(Note: The riders on the squad were Tejay van Garderen, Damiano Caruso, Alessandro De Marchi, Ben Hermans, Michael Schär, Dylan Teuns, Greg Van Avermaet and Peter Velits)	Oman	
February 22	Tour du Haut Var, Points classification	UCI Europe Tour	Philippe Gilbert (BEL)	France	
March 13	Tirreno–Adriatico, Stage 3	UCI World Tour	Greg Van Avermaet (BEL)	Italy	Arezzo
March 26	Volta a Catalunya, Stage 4	UCI World Tour	Tejay van Garderen (USA)	Spain	La Molina
March 29	Volta a Catalunya, Teams classification	UCI World Tour	(Note: The riders on the squad were Tejay van Garderen, Samuel Sánchez, Peter Stetina, Darwin Atapuma, Ben Hermans, Amaël Moinard, Dylan Teuns and Manuel Senni)	Spain	
April 4	Volta Limburg Classic	UCI Europe Tour	Stefan Küng (SUI)	Netherlands	Eijsden
April 15	Brabantse Pijl	UCI Europe Tour	Ben Hermans (BEL)	Belgium	Overijse
May 1	Tour de Romandie, Stage 4	UCI World Tour	Stefan Küng (SUI)	Switzerland	Fribourg
May 3	Tour de Yorkshire, Stage 3	UCI Europe Tour	Ben Hermans (BEL)	United Kingdom	Leeds
May 17	Tour of California, Mountains classification	UCI America Tour	Daniel Oss (ITA)	United States	
May 21	Giro d'Italia, Stage 12	UCI World Tour	Philippe Gilbert (BEL)	Italy	Vicenza (Monte Berico)
May 28	Giro d'Italia, Stage 18	UCI World Tour	Philippe Gilbert (BEL)	Italy	Verbania
May 31	Giro d'Italia, Combativity classification	UCI World Tour	Philippe Gilbert (BEL)	Italy	
May 31	Tour of Belgium, Stage 4	UCI Europe Tour	Greg Van Avermaet (BEL)	Belgium	St. Vith
May 31	Tour of Belgium, Overall	UCI Europe Tour	Greg Van Avermaet (BEL)	Belgium	
May 31	Tour of Belgium, Teams classification	UCI Europe Tour	(Note: The riders on the squad were Dylan Teuns, Rohan Dennis, Jempy Drucker, Campbell Flakemore, Manuel Senni, Manuel Quinziato, Michael Schär and Greg Van Avermaet)	Belgium	
June 9	Critérium du Dauphiné, Stage 3	UCI World Tour	Team time trial (Note: The riders on the squad were Tejay van Garderen, Rohan Dennis, Daniel Oss, Manuel Quinziato, Joey Rosskopf, Michael Schär, Samuel Sánchez and Dylan Teuns)	France	Montagny
July 4	Tour de France, Stage 1	UCI World Tour	Rohan Dennis (AUS)	Netherlands	Utrecht
July 4	Tour of Austria, Stage 3	UCI Europe Tour	Rick Zabel (GER)	Austria	Judendorf-Straßengel
July 12	Tour de France, Stage 9	UCI World Tour	Team time trial (Note: The riders on the squad were Tejay van Garderen, Damiano Caruso, Rohan Dennis, Daniel Oss, Manuel Quinziato, Samuel Sánchez, Michael Schär, Greg Van Avermaet and Danilo Wyss)	France	Plumelec
July 12	Tour of Austria, Teams classification	UCI Europe Tour	(Note: The riders on the squad were Brent Bookwalter, Ben Hermans, Amaël Moinard, Joey Rosskopf, Manuel Senni, Dylan Teuns, Peter Velits and Rick Zabel)	Austria	
July 17	Tour de France, Stage 13	UCI World Tour	Greg Van Avermaet (BEL)	France	Rodez
July 22	Grand Prix Pino Cerami	UCI Europe Tour	Philippe Gilbert (BEL)	Belgium	Frameries
July 27	Tour de Wallonie, Stage 3	UCI Europe Tour	Philippe Gilbert (BEL)	Belgium	Namur
August 2	RideLondon–Surrey Classic	UCI Europe Tour	Jempy Drucker (LUX)	United Kingdom	London
August 9	Tour of Utah, Points classification	UCI America Tour	Brent Bookwalter (USA)	United States	
August 15	Arctic Race of Norway, Stage 3	UCI Europe Tour	Ben Hermans (BEL)	Norway	Målselv
August 16	Eneco Tour, Stage 7	UCI World Tour	Manuel Quinziato (ITA)	Belgium	Geraardsbergen
August 16	Arctic Race of Norway, Stage 4	UCI Europe Tour	Silvan Dillier (SUI)	Norway	Narvik
August 16	Arctic Race of Norway, Young rider classification	UCI Europe Tour	Silvan Dillier (SUI)	Norway	
August 16	Arctic Race of Norway, Teams classification	UCI Europe Tour	(Note: The riders on the squad were Ben Hermans, Tom Bohli, Silvan Dillier, Campbell Flakemore, Floris Gerts and Dylan Teuns)	Norway	
August 17	USA Pro Cycling Challenge, Stage 1	UCI America Tour	Taylor Phinney (USA)	United States	Steamboat Springs
August 18	USA Pro Cycling Challenge, Stage 2	UCI America Tour	Brent Bookwalter (USA)	United States	Arapahoe Basin
August 20	USA Pro Cycling Challenge, Stage 4	UCI America Tour	Rohan Dennis (AUS)	United States	Breckenridge
August 21	USA Pro Cycling Challenge, Stage 5	UCI America Tour	Rohan Dennis (AUS)	United States	Breckenridge
August 22	Vuelta a España, Stage 1	UCI World Tour	Team time trial (Note: The riders on the squad were Samuel Sánchez, Darwin Atapuma, Marcus Burghardt, Alessandro De Marchi, Jempy Drucker, Amaël Moinard, Joey Rosskopf, Tejay van Garderen, and Peter Velits)	Spain	Marbella
August 23	USA Pro Cycling Challenge, Overall	UCI America Tour	Rohan Dennis (AUS)	United States	
August 23	USA Pro Cycling Challenge, Mountains classification	UCI America Tour	Rohan Dennis (AUS)	United States	
August 23	USA Pro Cycling Challenge, Teams classification	UCI America Tour	(Note: The riders on the squad were Rohan Dennis, Brent Bookwalter, Damiano Caruso, Kilian Frankiny, Taylor Phinney, Michael Schär, Manuel Senni and Peter Stetina)	United States	
September 5	Vuelta a España, Stage 14	UCI World Tour	Alessandro De Marchi (ITA)	Spain	Alto Campoo
September 20	UCI Road World Championships, Team time trial	UCI World Tour	(Note: The riders on the squad were Rohan Dennis, Silvan Dillier, Stefan Küng, Daniel Oss, Taylor Phinney, and Manuel Quinziato)	United States	Richmond

== National, Continental and World champions 2015 ==
Date	Discipline	Jersey	Rider	Country	Location
June 24	Swiss National Time Trial Champion		Silvan Dillier (SUI)	Switzerland	Épalinges
June 28	Swiss National Road Race Champion		Danilo Wyss (SUI)	Switzerland	Steinmaur
