= 2015 Team Giant–Alpecin season =

Team Giant–Alpecin
- 2015 season
- UCI code: TGA
- Status: UCI ProTeam
- Manager: Iwan Spekenbrink
- Main sponsor(s): Giant Bicycles & Alpecin
- Based: Germany
- Bicycles: Giant
- Groupset: Shimano

Season victories
- One-day races: 4
- Stage race overall: –
- Stage race stages: 13
- National Championships: 1

The 2015 season for the Team Giant–Alpecin began in January with the Tour Down Under. As a UCI WorldTeam, they were automatically invited and obligated to send a squad to every event in the UCI World Tour.

In September 2014 German shampoo manufacturer Alpecin announced that they would co-sponsor the team alongside Giant for the 2015 season. In December 2014 Sunweb (a Dutch owned international tour operator) was announced as a new major sponsor of the team, signing a 2-year deal.

== Team roster ==
As of 1 January 2015

Rider	Date of birth
Nikias Arndt (GER)	18 November 1991 (aged 23)
Bert De Backer (BEL)	2 April 1984 (aged 30)
Warren Barguil (FRA)	28 October 1991 (aged 23)
Lawson Craddock (USA)	20 March 1992 (aged 22)
Roy Curvers (NED)	27 December 1979 (aged 35)
John Degenkolb (GER)	7 January 1989 (aged 25)
Tom Dumoulin (NED)	11 November 1990 (aged 24)
Caleb Fairly (USA)	19 February 1987 (aged 27)
Johannes Fröhlinger (GER)	9 June 1985 (aged 29)
Simon Geschke (GER)	13 March 1986 (aged 28)
Lars van der Haar (NED)	23 July 1991 (aged 23)
Chad Haga (USA)	26 August 1988 (aged 26)
Thierry Hupond (FRA)	10 November 1984 (aged 30)
Ji Cheng (CHN)	15 July 1987 (aged 27)

Rider	Date of birth
Carter Jones (USA)	27 February 1989 (aged 25)
Marcel Kittel (GER)	11 May 1988 (aged 26)
Koen de Kort (NED)	8 September 1982 (aged 32)
Fredrik Ludvigsson (SWE)	28 April 1994 (aged 20)
Tobias Ludvigsson (SWE)	22 February 1991 (aged 23)
Luka Mezgec (SLO)	27 June 1988 (aged 26)
Daan Olivier (Note: Olivier retired from cycling in June.) (NED)	24 November 1992 (aged 22)
Georg Preidler (AUT)	17 June 1990 (aged 24)
Ramon Sinkeldam (NED)	9 February 1989 (aged 25)
Tom Stamsnijder (NED)	15 May 1985 (aged 29)
Albert Timmer (NED)	13 June 1985 (aged 29)
Tom Veelers (NED)	14 September 1984 (aged 30)
Zico Waeytens (BEL)	29 September 1991 (aged 23)

Riders who joined the team for the 2015 season

Rider	2014 team
Carter Jones	neo-pro (Optum–Kelly Benefit Strategies)
Fredrik Ludvigsson	neo-pro (Development Giant-Shimano)
Lars van der Haar	neo-pro (Development Giant-Shimano)
Zico Waeytens	Topsport Vlaanderen–Baloise

Riders who left the team during or after the 2014 season

Rider	2015 team
Jonas Ahlstrand	Cofidis
Brian Bulgaç	LottoNL–Jumbo
Thomas Damuseau	Roubaix-Lille Métropole
Dries Devenyns	IAM Cycling
Reinardt Janse van Rensburg	MTN–Qhubeka
Loh Sea Keong	SEG Racing Development
Tom Peterson	Retired
Matthieu Sprick	Retired

== Season victories ==
Date	Race	Competition	Rider	Country	Location
6 February	Dubai Tour, Stage 3	UCI Asia Tour	John Degenkolb (GER)	United Arab Emirates	Hatta
22 February	Tour du Haut Var, Stage 2	UCI Europe Tour	Luka Mezgec (SLO)	France	Draguignan
22 February	Vuelta a Andalucía, Sprints classification	UCI Europe Tour	Simon Geschke (GER)	Spain	
22 March	Milan–San Remo	UCI World Tour	John Degenkolb (GER)	Italy	Sanremo
11 April	Tour of the Basque Country, Stage 6	UCI World Tour	Tom Dumoulin (NED)	Spain	Aia
12 April	Paris–Roubaix	UCI World Tour	John Degenkolb (GER)	France	Roubaix
14 May	Bayern–Rundfahrt, Stage 2	UCI Europe Tour	John Degenkolb (GER)	Germany	Selb
17 May	Bayern–Rundfahrt, Stage 5	UCI Europe Tour	John Degenkolb (GER)	Germany	Nuremberg
17 May	Bayern–Rundfahrt, Points classification	UCI Europe Tour	John Degenkolb (GER)	Germany	
31 May	Velothon Berlin	UCI Europe Tour	Ramon Sinkeldam (NED)	Germany	Berlin
13 June	Tour de Suisse, Stage 1	UCI World Tour	Tom Dumoulin (NED)	Switzerland	Risch-Rotkreuz
21 June	Tour de Suisse, Stage 9	UCI World Tour	Tom Dumoulin (NED)	Switzerland	Bern
22 July	Tour de France, Stage 17	UCI World Tour	Simon Geschke (GER)	France	Pra-Loup
2 August	Tour de Pologne, Stage 1	UCI World Tour	Marcel Kittel (GER)	Poland	Warsaw
8 August	Tour de Pologne, Points classification	UCI World Tour	Marcel Kittel (GER)	Poland	
30 August	Vuelta a España, Stage 9	UCI World Tour	Tom Dumoulin (NED)	Spain	Benitachell
7 September	Tour of Alberta, Stage 6	UCI America Tour	Nikias Arndt (GER)	Canada	
9 September	Vuelta a España, Stage 17	UCI World Tour	Tom Dumoulin (NED)	Spain	Burgos
13 September	Vuelta a España, Stage 21	UCI World Tour	John Degenkolb (GER)	Spain	Madrid
13 September	Vuelta a España, Super-combativity award	UCI World Tour	Tom Dumoulin (NED)	Spain	
6 October	Binche–Chimay–Binche	UCI Europe Tour	Ramon Sinkeldam (NED)	Belgium	Binche

== National, Continental and World champions 2015 ==
Date	Discipline	Jersey	Rider	Country	Location
26 June	Austrian National Time Trial Champion		Georg Preidler (AUT)	Austria	Sulz im Burgenland
