= 2015 Team Tinkoff–Saxo season =

Team Tinkoff–Saxo
- 2015 season
- UCI code: TCS
- Status: UCI ProTeam
- Owner: Oleg Tinkov
- Manager: Steven de Jongh
- Main sponsor(s): Tinkoff Bank & Saxo Bank
- Based: Russia
- Bicycles: Specialized
- Groupset: Shimano

Season victories
- Stage race overall: 5
- Stage race stages: 16
- Grand Tours: 1
- World Championships: 1
- National Championships: 4

The 2015 season for Tinkoff–Saxo began in January with the Tour Down Under. As a UCI WorldTeam, they were automatically invited and obligated to send a squad to every event in the UCI World Tour.

In March 2015 the team confirmed that Riis had been removed from active duty due to differences between Riis and Tinkov. Media reports had initially indicated that Riis had been suspended when he did not appear at Milan–San Remo as planned, and that this was due to a disappointing start to the season for the team. On 29 March, it was announced that Riis had been released by the team. News reports cited the "tumultuous relationship" and "difference in character" between Riis and Tinkov as the reason for Riis's departure.

== Team roster ==
As of 1 January 2015

Rider	Date of birth
Ivan Basso (ITA)	26 November 1977 (aged 37)
Edward Beltrán (COL)	18 January 1990 (aged 24)
Daniele Bennati (ITA)	24 September 1980 (aged 34)
Manuele Boaro (ITA)	3 December 1987 (aged 27)
Maciej Bodnar (POL)	7 March 1985 (aged 29)
Matti Breschel (DEN)	31 August 1984 (aged 30)
Pavel Brutt (RUS)	29 January 1982 (aged 32)
Alberto Contador (ESP)	6 December 1982 (aged 32)
Jesper Hansen (DEN)	23 October 1990 (aged 24)
Jesús Hernández (ESP)	28 September 1981 (aged 33)
Christopher Juul-Jensen (DEN)	6 July 1989 (aged 25)
Robert Kišerlovski (CRO)	9 August 1986 (aged 28)
Michael Kolář (SVK)	21 December 1992 (aged 22)
Roman Kreuziger (CZE)	6 May 1986 (aged 28)
Rafał Majka (POL)	12 September 1989 (aged 25)

Rider	Date of birth
Jay McCarthy (AUS)	8 September 1992 (aged 22)
Michael Mørkøv (DEN)	30 April 1985 (aged 29)
Sérgio Paulinho (POR)	26 March 1980 (aged 34)
Evgeni Petrov (RUS)	25 May 1978 (aged 36)
Bruno Pires (POR)	15 May 1981 (aged 33)
Paweł Poljański (POL)	6 May 1990 (aged 24)
Michael Rogers (AUS)	20 December 1979 (aged 35)
Ivan Rovny (RUS)	30 September 1987 (aged 27)
Juraj Sagan (SVK)	23 December 1988 (aged 26)
Peter Sagan (SVK)	26 January 1990 (aged 24)
Chris Anker Sørensen (DEN)	5 September 1984 (aged 30)
Matteo Tosatto (ITA)	14 May 1974 (aged 40)
Nikolay Trusov (RUS)	2 July 1985 (aged 29)
Michael Valgren (DEN)	7 February 1992 (aged 22)
Oliver Zaugg (SUI)	9 May 1981 (aged 33)

Riders who joined the team for the 2015 season

Rider	2014 team
Ivan Basso	Cannondale
Maciej Bodnar	Cannondale
Pavel Brutt	Team Katusha
Robert Kišerlovski	Trek Factory Racing
Juraj Sagan	Cannondale
Peter Sagan	Cannondale

Riders who left the team during or after the 2014 season

Rider	2015 team
Karsten Kroon	Retired
Marko Kump	Adria Mobil
Nicolas Roche	Team Sky
Nicki Sørensen	Retired
Rory Sutherland	Movistar Team

== Season victories ==
Date	Race	Competition	Rider	Country	Location
7 February	Dubai Tour, Young rider classification	UCI Asia Tour	Michael Valgren (DEN)	United Arab Emirates	
13 February	Tour of Qatar, Young rider classification	UCI Asia Tour	Peter Sagan (SVK)	Qatar	
20 February	Vuelta a Andalucía, Stage 3	UCI Europe Tour	Alberto Contador (ESP)	Spain	Alto de Hazallanas
22 February	Vuelta a Andalucía, Spanish rider classification	UCI Europe Tour	Alberto Contador (ESP)	Spain	
16 March	Tirreno–Adriatico, Stage 6	UCI World Tour	Peter Sagan (SVK)	Italy	Porto Sant'Elpidio
17 March	Tirreno–Adriatico, Points classification	UCI World Tour	Peter Sagan (SVK)	Italy	
9 April	Circuit de la Sarthe, Stage 3	UCI Europe Tour	Manuele Boaro (ITA)	France	Pré-en-Pail
13 May	Tour of California, Stage 4	UCI America Tour	Peter Sagan (SVK)	United States	Avila Beach
15 May	Tour of California, Stage 6	UCI America Tour	Peter Sagan (SVK)	United States	Santa Clarita
17 May	Tour of California, Overall	UCI America Tour	Peter Sagan (SVK)	United States	
22 May	Tour of Norway, Stage 3	UCI Europe Tour	Jesper Hansen (DEN)	Norway	Rjukan
24 May	Tour of Norway, Overall	UCI Europe Tour	Jesper Hansen (DEN)	Norway	
31 May	Giro d'Italia, Overall	UCI World Tour	Alberto Contador (ESP)	Italy	
15 June	Tour de Suisse, Stage 3	UCI World Tour	Peter Sagan (SVK)	Switzerland	Olivone
18 June	Tour de Suisse, Stage 6	UCI World Tour	Peter Sagan (SVK)	Switzerland	Biel/Bienne
20 June	Route du Sud, Stage 3	UCI Europe Tour	Alberto Contador (ESP)	France	Bagnères-de-Luchon
21 June	Route du Sud, Overall	UCI Europe Tour	Alberto Contador (ESP)	France	
21 June	Tour de Suisse, Points classification	UCI World Tour	Peter Sagan (SVK)	Switzerland	
15 July	Tour de France, Stage 11	UCI World Tour	Rafał Majka (POL)	France	Cauterets
26 July	Tour de France, Points classification	UCI World Tour	Peter Sagan (SVK)	France	
5 August	Tour de Pologne, Stage 4	UCI World Tour	Maciej Bodnar (POL)	Poland	Nowy Sącz
6 August	Danmark Rundt, Stage 3	UCI Europe Tour	Matti Breschel (DEN)	Denmark	Vejle
7 August	Danmark Rundt, Stage 4	UCI Europe Tour	Matti Breschel (DEN)	Denmark	Frederiksværk
8 August	Danmark Rundt, Stage 6	UCI Europe Tour	Michael Mørkøv (DEN)	Denmark	Frederiksberg
8 August	Danmark Rundt, Overall	UCI Europe Tour	Christopher Juul-Jensen (DEN)	Denmark	
8 August	Danmark Rundt, Points classification	UCI Europe Tour	Matti Breschel (DEN)	Denmark	
8 August	Danmark Rundt, Teams classification	UCI Europe Tour	(Note: The riders on the squad were Michael Valgren, Matti Breschel, Christopher Juul-Jensen, Michael Kolář, Jay McCarthy, Juraj Sagan, Michael Mørkøv and Michael Gogl)	Denmark	
22 August	USA Pro Cycling Challenge, Stage 6	UCI America Tour	Roman Kreuziger (CZE)	United States	Fort Collins
24 August	Vuelta a España, Stage 3	UCI World Tour	Peter Sagan (SVK)	Spain	Málaga

== National, Continental and World champions 2015 ==
Date	Discipline	Jersey	Rider	Country	Location
25 June	Danish National Time Trial Champion		Christopher Juul-Jensen (DEN)	Denmark	Rønde
26 June	Slovak National Time Trial Champion		Peter Sagan (SVK)	Slovakia	Žilina
28 June	Danish National Road Race Champion		Chris Anker Sørensen (DEN)	Denmark	Rønde
28 June	Slovak National Road Race Champion		Peter Sagan (SVK)	Slovakia	Žilina
27 September	World Road Race Championships		Peter Sagan (SVK)	United States	Richmond
