= UnitedHealthcare Pro Cycling =

UnitedHealthcare Pro Cycling (or simply UnitedHealthcare) may refer to either of two (defunct) cycling teams, each sponsored by UnitedHealth Group:

- UnitedHealthcare Pro Cycling (men's team), which competed on the UCI World Tour, from 2003 to 2018 (taking on the UnitedHealthcare name in 2009)
- UnitedHealthcare Pro Cycling (women's team), which competed on the UCI Women's World Tour, from 2014 to 2018
