= 2015 GP Ouest-France =

2015 UCI World Tour, race 23 of 28

Race details
- Dates: 30 August 2015
- Stages: 1
- Distance: 229.1 km (142.4 mi)
- Winning time: 5:31:32

Results
	Winner	Alexander Kristoff (NOR)	(Team Katusha)
	Second	Simone Ponzi (ITA)	(Southeast Pro Cycling)
	Third	Ramūnas Navardauskas (LIT)	(Cannondale–Garmin)

The 2015 GP Ouest-France was a one-day classic cycle race that took place in Plouay on 30 August 2015. The race was the 79th edition of the GP Ouest-France and was the twenty-fourth race of the 2015 UCI World Tour.

The race came down to a bunch sprint of 69 riders. The winner was Alexander Kristoff (Team Katusha), who won his twentieth race of the season. Simone Ponzi (Southeast Pro Cycling) was second, with Ramūnas Navardauskas (Cannondale–Garmin) third.

== Result ==
Rank	Rider	Team	Time
1	Alexander Kristoff (NOR)	Team Katusha	5hr 31' 32"
2	Simone Ponzi (ITA)	Southeast Pro Cycling	+ 0"
3	Ramūnas Navardauskas (LIT)	Cannondale–Garmin	+ 0"
4	Grega Bole (SLO)	CCC–Sprandi–Polkowice	+ 0"
5	Jürgen Roelandts (BEL)	Lotto–Soudal	+ 0"
6	Anthony Roux (FRA)	FDJ	+ 0"
7	Armindo Fonseca (FRA)	Bretagne–Séché Environnement	+ 0"
8	Wout Poels (NED)	Team Sky	+ 0"
9	Rasmus Guldhammer (DEN)	Cult Energy Pro Cycling	+ 0"
10	Magnus Cort (DEN)	Orica–GreenEDGE	+ 0"
Source: ProCyclingStats
