= 2015 UCI World Tour =

Road cycling competitions

- Fifth edition of the UCI World Tour

Details
- Dates: 20 January – 4 October
- Location: Europe, Canada, and Australia
- Races: 28

Champions
- Individual champion: Alejandro Valverde (Spain) (Movistar Team)
- Teams' champion: Movistar Team
- Nations' champion: Spain

The 2015 UCI World Tour was the seventh edition of the ranking system launched by the Union Cycliste Internationale (UCI) in 2009. The series started with the opening stage of the Tour Down Under on 20 January, and concluded with Il Lombardia on 4 October.

For the second successive year, Spain's Alejandro Valverde won the World Tour individual points title, amassing 675 points over the course of the season. The Movistar Team rider finished 201 points clear of his closest rival and compatriot Joaquim Rodríguez of Team Katusha, while Colombian rider Nairo Quintana was third – also for the Movistar Team – 17 points behind Rodríguez and 218 points in arrears of Valverde. In the teams' rankings, Movistar Team finished top for the third year running, with a total of 1619 points. Second place went to Team Katusha, 13 points behind, while Team Sky finished in third position. The nations' rankings was comfortably headed by Spain, with a points advantage of 839 over Italy, who moved into second at the final race with Vincenzo Nibali's victory at Il Lombardia.

== Teams ==
The UCI WorldTeams competed in the World Tour, with UCI Professional Continental teams, or national squads, able to enter at the discretion of the organisers of each event.

2015 UCI World Teams and equipment
Code	Official team name	Licence holder	Country	Groupset	Bicycles
ALM	AG2R La Mondiale (2015 season)	EUSRL France Cyclisme	France	SRAM	Focus
AST	Astana (2015 season)	Abacanto SA	Kazakhstan	Campagnolo	Specialized
BMC	BMC Racing Team (2015 season)	Continuum Sports LLC	United States	Shimano	BMC
TCG	Cannondale–Garmin (2015 season)	Slipstream Sports, LLC	United States	Shimano	Cannondale
EQS	Etixx–Quick-Step (2015 season)	Esperanza bvba	Belgium	Shimano	Specialized
FDJ	FDJ (2015 season)	Société de Gestion de L'Echappée	France	Shimano	Lapierre
TGA	Team Giant–Alpecin (2015 season)	SMS Cycling B.V.	Germany	Shimano	Giant
IAM	IAM Cycling (2015 season)		Switzerland	Shimano	Scott
KAT	Team Katusha (2015 season)	Katusha Management SA	Russia	Shimano	Canyon
LAM	Lampre–Merida (2015 season)	CGS Cycling Team AG	Italy	Shimano	Merida
LTS	Lotto–Soudal (2015 season)	Belgian Cycling Company sa	Belgium	Campagnolo	Ridley
TLJ	LottoNL–Jumbo (2015 season)	Rabo Wielerploegen	Netherlands	Shimano	Bianchi
MOV	Movistar Team (2015 season)	Abarca Sports S.L.	Spain	Campagnolo	Canyon
OGE	Orica–GreenEDGE (2015 season)	GreenEdge Cycling	Australia	Shimano	Scott
SKY	Team Sky (2015 season)	Tour Racing Limited	Great Britain	Shimano	Pinarello
TCS	Tinkoff–Saxo (2015 season)	Tinkoff Sport	Russia	Shimano	Specialized
TFR	Trek Factory Racing (2015 season)	Trek Bicycle Corporation	United States	Shimano	Trek

== Events ==
All events from the 2014 UCI World Tour are included, except the Tour of Beijing, which will no longer be organised.

Race	Date	Winner		Second		Third		Other points (4th place onwards)	Stage points
(Australia) Tour Down Under	January 20 – 25	Rohan Dennis (AUS)	100 pts	Richie Porte (AUS)	80 pts	Cadel Evans (AUS)	70 pts	60, 50, 40, 30, 20, 10, 4	6, 4, 2, 1, 1
(France) Paris–Nice	March 8 – 15	Richie Porte (AUS)	100 pts	Michał Kwiatkowski (POL)	80 pts	Simon Špilak (SLO)	70 pts	60, 50, 40, 30, 20, 10, 4	6, 4, 2, 1, 1
(Italy) Tirreno–Adriatico	March 11 – 17	Nairo Quintana (COL)	100 pts	Bauke Mollema (NED)	80 pts	Rigoberto Urán (COL)	70 pts	60, 50, 40, 30, 20, 10, 4	6, 4, 2, 1, 1
(Italy) Milan–San Remo	March 22	John Degenkolb (GER)	100 pts	Alexander Kristoff (NOR)	80 pts	Michael Matthews (AUS)	70 pts	60, 50, 40, 30, 20, 10, 4	N/A
(Spain) Volta a Catalunya	March 23 – 29	Richie Porte (AUS)	100 pts	Alejandro Valverde (ESP)	80 pts	Domenico Pozzovivo (ITA)	70 pts	60, 50, 40, 30, 20, 10, 4	6, 4, 2, 1, 1
(Belgium) E3 Harelbeke	March 27	Geraint Thomas (GBR)	80 pts	Zdeněk Štybar (CZE)	60 pts	Matteo Trentin (ITA)	50 pts	40, 30, 22, 14, 10, 6, 2	N/A
(Belgium) Gent–Wevelgem	March 29	Luca Paolini (ITA)	80 pts	Niki Terpstra (NED)	60 pts	Geraint Thomas (GBR)	50 pts	40, 30, 22, 14, 10, 6, 2	N/A
(Belgium) Tour of Flanders	April 5	Alexander Kristoff (NOR)	100 pts	Niki Terpstra (NED)	80 pts	Greg Van Avermaet (BEL)	70 pts	60, 50, 40, 30, 20, 10, 4	N/A
(Spain) Tour of the Basque Country	April 6 – 11	Joaquim Rodríguez (ESP)	100 pts	Sergio Henao (COL)	80 pts	Jon Izagirre (ESP)	70 pts	60, 50, 40, 30, 20, 10, 4	6, 4, 2, 1, 1
(France) Paris–Roubaix	April 12	John Degenkolb (GER)	100 pts	Zdeněk Štybar (CZE)	80 pts	Greg Van Avermaet (BEL)	70 pts	60, 50, 40, 30, 20, 10, 4	N/A
(Netherlands) Amstel Gold Race	April 19	Michał Kwiatkowski (POL)	80 pts	Alejandro Valverde (ESP)	60 pts	Michael Matthews (AUS)	50 pts	40, 30, 22, 14, 10, 6, 2	N/A
(Belgium) La Flèche Wallonne	April 22	Alejandro Valverde (ESP)	80 pts	Julian Alaphilippe (FRA)	60 pts	Michael Albasini (SUI)	50 pts	40, 30, 22, 14, 10, 6, 2	N/A
(Belgium) Liège–Bastogne–Liège	April 26	Alejandro Valverde (ESP)	100 pts	Julian Alaphilippe (FRA)	80 pts	Joaquim Rodríguez (ESP)	70 pts	60, 50, 40, 30, 20, 10, 4	N/A
(Switzerland) Tour de Romandie	April 28 – May 3	Ilnur Zakarin (RUS)	100 pts	Simon Špilak (SLO)	80 pts	Chris Froome (GBR)	70 pts	60, 50, 40, 30, 20, 10, 4	6, 4, 2, 1, 1
(Italy) Giro d'Italia	May 9 – 31	Alberto Contador (ESP)	170 pts	Fabio Aru (ITA)	130 pts	Mikel Landa (ESP)	100 pts	90, 80, 70, 60, 52, 44, 38, 32, 26, 22, 18, 14, 10, 8, 6, 4, 2	16, 8, 4, 2, 1
(France) Critérium du Dauphiné	June 7 – 14	Chris Froome (GBR)	100 pts	Tejay van Garderen (USA)	80 pts	Rui Costa (POR)	70 pts	60, 50, 40, 30, 20, 10, 4	6, 4, 2, 1, 1
(Switzerland) Tour de Suisse	June 13 – 21	Simon Špilak (SLO)	100 pts	Geraint Thomas (GBR)	80 pts	Tom Dumoulin (NED)	70 pts	60, 50, 40, 30, 20, 10, 4	6, 4, 2, 1, 1
Tour de France	July 4 – 26	Chris Froome (GBR)	200 pts	Nairo Quintana (COL)	150 pts	Alejandro Valverde (ESP)	120 pts	110, 100, 90, 80, 70, 60, 50, 40, 30, 24, 20, 16, 12, 10, 8, 6, 4	20, 10, 6, 4, 2
(Spain) Clásica de San Sebastián	August 1	Adam Yates (GBR)	80 pts	Philippe Gilbert (BEL)	60 pts	Alejandro Valverde (ESP)	50 pts	40, 30, 22, 14, 10, 6, 2	N/A
(Poland) Tour de Pologne	August 2 – 8	Jon Izagirre (ESP)	100 pts	Bart De Clercq (BEL)	80 pts	Ben Hermans (BEL)	70 pts	60, 50, 40, 30, 20, 10, 4	6, 4, 2, 1, 1
(Belgium) (Netherlands) Eneco Tour	August 10 – 16	Tim Wellens (BEL)	100 pts	Greg Van Avermaet (BEL)	80 pts	Wilco Kelderman (NED)	70 pts	60, 50, 40, 30, 20, 10, 4	6, 4, 2, 1, 1
(Spain) Vuelta a España	August 22 – September 13	Fabio Aru (ITA)	170 pts	Joaquim Rodríguez (ESP)	130 pts	Rafał Majka (POL)	100 pts	90, 80, 70, 60, 52, 44, 38, 32, 26, 22, 18, 14, 10, 8, 6, 4, 2	16, 8, 4, 2, 1
(Germany) Vattenfall Cyclassics	August 23	André Greipel (GER)	80 pts	Alexander Kristoff (NOR)	60 pts	Giacomo Nizzolo (ITA)	50 pts	40, 30, 22, 14, 10, 6, 2	N/A
GP Ouest-France	August 30	Alexander Kristoff (NOR)	80 pts	Simone Ponzi (ITA)	0 pts (Note: As Ponzi rode for Southeast Pro Cycling, which is not a World Tour team, he was ineligible to score points towards the UCI World Tour standings.)	Ramūnas Navardauskas (LTU)	50 pts	40, 30, 22, 14, 10, 6, 2	N/A
(Canada) GP de Québec	September 11	Rigoberto Urán (COL)	80 pts	Michael Matthews (AUS)	60 pts	Alexander Kristoff (NOR)	50 pts	40, 30, 22, 14, 10, 6, 2	N/A
(Canada) GP de Montréal	September 13	Tim Wellens (BEL)	80 pts	Adam Yates (GBR)	60 pts	Rui Costa (POR)	50 pts	40, 30, 22, 14, 10, 6, 2	N/A
(United States) Team time trial at the World Championships (Note: The World Team Time Trial Championship awards points only in the team rankings, not in the individual or national standings.)	September 20	BMC Racing Team	200 pts	Etixx–Quick-Step	170 pts	Movistar Team	140 pts	130, 120, 110, 100, 90, 80, 70	N/A
(Italy) Il Lombardia	October 4	Vincenzo Nibali (ITA)	100 pts	Daniel Moreno (ESP)	80 pts	Thibaut Pinot (FRA)	70 pts	60, 50, 40, 30, 20, 10, 4	N/A

== Final standings ==
=== Individual ===
Riders tied with the same number of points were classified by number of victories, then number of second places, third places, and so on, in World Tour events and stages.

Rank	Name	Team	Points
1	Alejandro Valverde (ESP)	Movistar Team	675
2	Joaquim Rodríguez (ESP)	Team Katusha	474
3	Nairo Quintana (COL)	Movistar Team	457
4	Alexander Kristoff (NOR)	Team Katusha	453
5	Fabio Aru (ITA)	Astana	448
6	Chris Froome (GBR)	Team Sky	430
7	Alberto Contador (ESP)	Tinkoff–Saxo	407
8	Greg Van Avermaet (BEL)	BMC Racing Team	324
9	Rui Costa (POR)	Lampre–Merida	324
10	Thibaut Pinot (FRA)	FDJ	319
11	Richie Porte (AUS)	Team Sky	314
12	John Degenkolb (GER)	Team Giant–Alpecin	302
13	Rigoberto Urán (COL)	Etixx–Quick-Step	301
14	Geraint Thomas (GBR)	Team Sky	283
15	Tom Dumoulin (NED)	Team Giant–Alpecin	271
16	Simon Špilak (SLO)	Team Katusha	269
17	Peter Sagan (SVK)	Tinkoff–Saxo	257
18	Domenico Pozzovivo (ITA)	AG2R La Mondiale	242
19	Vincenzo Nibali (ITA)	Astana	238
20	Michael Matthews (AUS)	Orica–GreenEDGE	221
21	Daniel Moreno (ESP)	Team Katusha	216
22	Bauke Mollema (NED)	Trek Factory Racing	212
23	Romain Bardet (FRA)	AG2R La Mondiale	206
24	André Greipel (GER)	Lotto–Soudal	203
25	Tim Wellens (BEL)	Lotto–Soudal	195

- 215 riders scored points. 48 other riders finished in positions that would have earned them points, but they were ineligible as members of non-WorldTour teams.

=== Team ===
Team rankings were calculated by adding the ranking points of the top five riders of a team in the table, plus points gained in the World Team Time Trial Championship (WTTT).

Rank	Team	Points	Top 5 riders	WTTT
1	Movistar Team	1619	Valverde (675), N. Quintana (457), J. Izagirre (173), Amador (93), Intxausti (81)	140
2	Team Katusha	1606	Rodríguez (474), Kristoff (453), Špilak (269), D. Moreno (216), Zakarin (194)	0
3	Team Sky	1378	Froome (430), Porte (314), Thomas (283), Ser. Henao (167), Nieve (104)	80
4	Etixx–Quick-Step	1158	Urán (301), Kwiatkowski (195), Alaphilippe (180), Štybar (172), Terpstra (140)	170
5	Astana	1106	Aru (448), Nibali (238), Landa (164), Boom (102), Fuglsang (64)	90
6	BMC Racing Team	1010	Van Avermaet (324), Gilbert (179), Dennis (135), van Garderen (96), Evans (76)	200
7	Tinkoff–Saxo	929	Contador (407), P. Sagan (257), Majka (165), Kreuziger (64), Breschel (36)	0
8	Orica–GreenEDGE	845	Matthews (221), A. Yates (150), S. Yates (148), Chaves (134), Albasini (62)	130
9	Lotto–Soudal	832	Greipel (203), Wellens (195), Gallopin (127), De Clercq (106), Benoot (101)	100
10	Team Giant–Alpecin	769	Degenkolb (302), T. Dumoulin (271), Barguil (34), Geschke (32), Sinkeldam (10)	120
11	AG2R La Mondiale	587	Pozzovivo (242), Bardet (206), Bakelants (59), Vuillermoz (49), Riblon (31)	0
12	Lampre–Merida	566	Costa (324), Ulissi (98), Bonifazio (60), Modolo (43), Valls (41)	0
13	Trek Factory Racing	529	Mollema (212), Nizzolo (78), Felline (64), Cancellara (59), Jungels (46)	70
14	LottoNL–Jumbo	485	Gesink (114), Kelderman (111), Kruijswijk (80), Vanmarcke (52), Lindeman (18)	110
15	FDJ	439	Pinot (319), Geniez (44), Démare (33), Roux (22), Morabito (21)	0
16	Cannondale–Garmin	340	Hesjedal (102), D. Martin (85), Talansky (54), Navardauskas (50), Slagter (49)	0
17	IAM Cycling	189	Frank (72), Elmiger (56), Pantano (27), Pelucchi (20), Sy. Chavanel (14)	0

=== Nation ===
National rankings were calculated by adding the ranking points of the top five riders registered in a nation in the table. The national rankings, as of 15 August, were also used to determine how many riders a country could have in the World Championships.

Rank	Nation	Points	Top 5 riders (if applicable)
1	Spain	1945	Valverde (675), Rodríguez (474), Contador (407), D. Moreno (216), J. Izagirre (173)
2	Italy	1106	Aru (448), Pozzovivo (242), Nibali (238), Ulissi (98), Paolini (80)
3	Colombia	1099	N. Quintana (457), Urán (301), Ser. Henao (167), Chaves (134), Atapuma (40)
4	Great Britain	1041	Froome (430), Thomas (283), A. Yates (150), S. Yates (148), Cavendish (30)
5	Belgium	905	Van Avermaet (324), Wellens (195), Gilbert (179), De Clercq (106), Benoot (101)
6	France	881	Pinot (319), Bardet (206), Alaphilippe (180), Gallopin (127), Vuillermoz (49)
7	Netherlands	848	T. Dumoulin (271), Mollema (212), Terpstra (140), Gesink (114), Kelderman (111)
8	Australia	777	Porte (314), Matthews (221), Dennis (135), Evans (76), Rogers (31)
9	Germany	587	Degenkolb (302), Greipel (203), T. Martin (40), Geschke (32), Kittel (10)
10	Norway	453	Kristoff (453)
11	Poland	376	Kwiatkowski (195), Majka (165), Bodnar (16)
12	Portugal	355	Costa (324), Oliveira (24), Cardoso (6), Machado (1)
13	Czech Republic	306	Štybar (172), König (70), Kreuziger (64)
14	Slovenia	294	Špilak (269), Polanc (16), Mezgec (9)
15	Switzerland	270	Frank (72), Albasini (62), Cancellara (59), Elmiger (56), Morabito (21)

- Riders from 34 countries scored points.

== Leader progress ==
Event (Winner)	Individual	Team	Nation
Tour Down Under (Rohan Dennis)	Rohan Dennis	BMC Racing Team	Australia
Paris–Nice (Richie Porte)	Richie Porte	Team Sky	Australia
Tirreno–Adriatico (Nairo Quintana)	Richie Porte	Team Sky	Australia
Milan–San Remo (John Degenkolb)	Richie Porte	Team Sky	Australia
E3 Harelbeke (Geraint Thomas)	Richie Porte	Team Sky	Australia
Volta a Catalunya (Richie Porte)	Richie Porte	Team Sky	Australia
Gent–Wevelgem (Luca Paolini)	Richie Porte	Team Sky	Australia
Tour of Flanders (Alexander Kristoff)	Richie Porte	Team Sky	Australia
Tour of the Basque Country (Joaquim Rodríguez)	Richie Porte	Team Sky	Australia
Paris–Roubaix (John Degenkolb)	Richie Porte	Team Sky	Australia
Amstel Gold Race (Michał Kwiatkowski)	Richie Porte	Etixx–Quick-Step	Australia
La Flèche Wallonne (Alejandro Valverde)	Richie Porte	Etixx–Quick-Step	Australia
Liège–Bastogne–Liège (Alejandro Valverde)	Alejandro Valverde	Etixx–Quick-Step	Spain
Tour de Romandie (Ilnur Zakarin)	Alejandro Valverde	Etixx–Quick-Step	Spain
Giro d'Italia (Alberto Contador)	Alejandro Valverde	Etixx–Quick-Step	Spain
Critérium du Dauphiné (Chris Froome)	Alejandro Valverde	Team Sky	Spain
Tour de Suisse (Simon Špilak)	Alejandro Valverde	Team Katusha	Spain
Tour de France (Chris Froome)	Alejandro Valverde	Team Sky	Spain
Clásica de San Sebastián (Adam Yates)	Alejandro Valverde	Team Sky	Spain
Tour de Pologne (Jon Izagirre)	Alejandro Valverde	Team Sky	Spain
Eneco Tour (Tim Wellens)	Alejandro Valverde	Team Sky	Spain
Vattenfall Cyclassics (André Greipel)	Alejandro Valverde	Team Sky	Spain
GP Ouest-France (Alexander Kristoff)	Alejandro Valverde	Team Katusha	Spain
Grand Prix Cycliste de Québec (Rigoberto Urán)	Alejandro Valverde	Team Katusha	Spain
Vuelta a España (Fabio Aru)	Alejandro Valverde	Team Katusha	Spain
Grand Prix Cycliste de Montréal (Tim Wellens)	Alejandro Valverde	Team Katusha	Spain
World TTT Championships (BMC Racing Team)	Alejandro Valverde	Movistar Team	Spain
Il Lombardia (Vincenzo Nibali)	Alejandro Valverde	Movistar Team	Spain
