= 2015 Grand Prix Cycliste de Québec =

2015 UCI World Tour, race 25 of 28
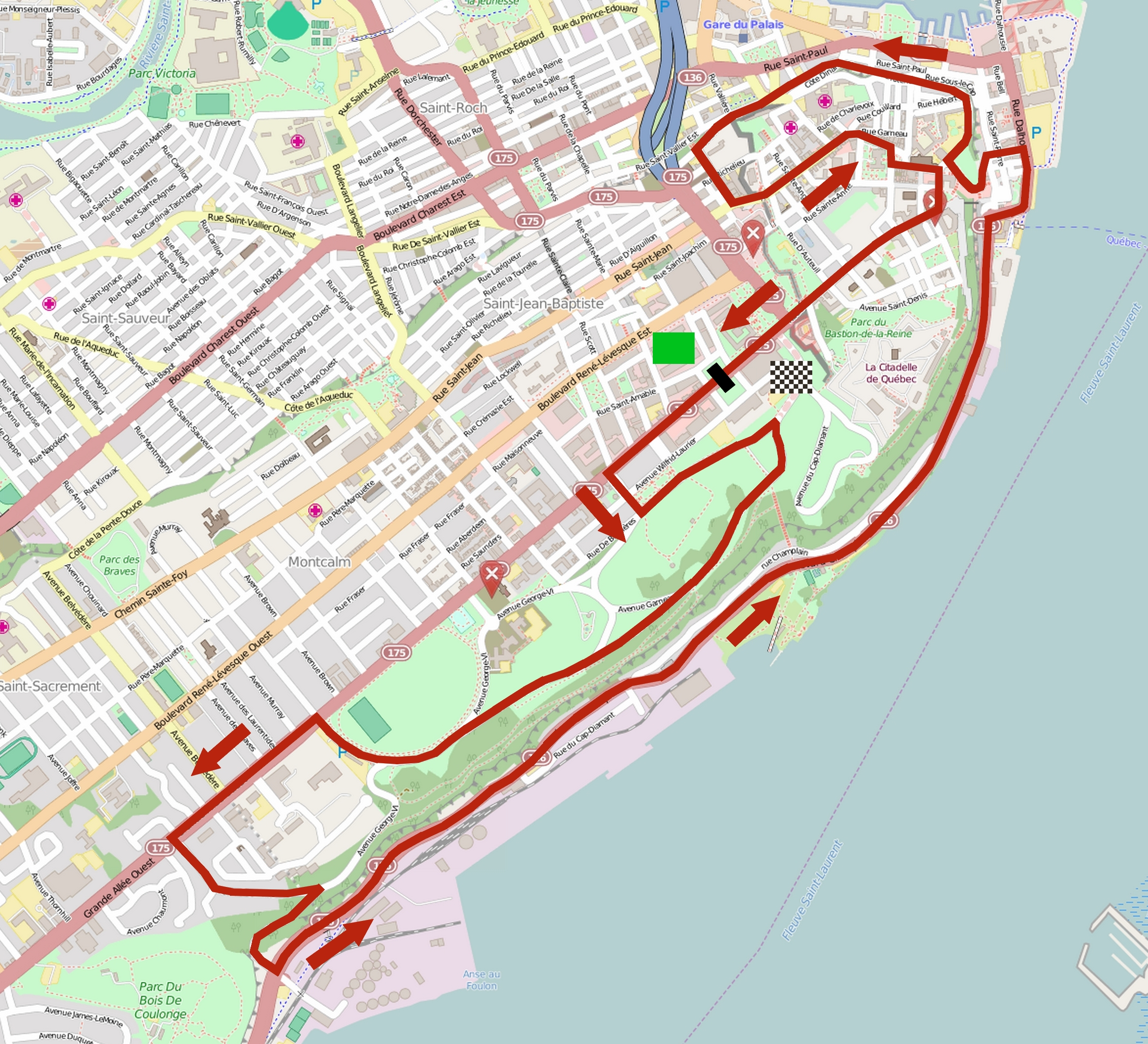

Race details
- Dates: 11 September 2015
- Stages: 1
- Distance: 201.6 km (125.3 mi)
- Winning time: 5h 09' 46"

Results
	Winner	Rigoberto Urán (COL)	(Etixx–Quick-Step)
	Second	Michael Matthews (AUS)	(Orica–GreenEDGE)
	Third	Alexander Kristoff (NOR)	(Team Katusha)

The 2015 Grand Prix Cycliste de Québec was the sixth edition of the Grand Prix Cycliste de Québec one-day cycling race. It took place on 11 September and was the twenty-fifth race of the 2015 UCI World Tour. The race was won by Rigoberto Urán.

== Teams ==
As the Grand Prix Cycliste de Québec was a UCI World Tour event, all 17 UCI ProTeams were invited automatically and obligated to send a squad. Three UCI Professional Continental teams (Bora-Argon 18, Drapac, and Team Europcar) and a Canadian national squad also competed in the race, and as such, forming the event's 21-team peloton.

The 21 teams that competed in the race were:

- AG2R La Mondiale
- Astana
- Bora–Argon 18
- BMC Racing Team
- Canada (national team) †
- Cannondale–Garmin
- Drapac Professional Cycling
- Etixx–Quick-Step
- Team Europcar
- FDJ
- Team Giant–Alpecin
- IAM Cycling
- Team Katusha
- Lampre–Merida
- LottoNL–Jumbo
- Lotto–Soudal
- Movistar Team
- Orica–GreenEDGE
- Team Sky
- Tinkoff–Saxo
- Trek Factory Racing

== Results ==
	Cyclist	Team	Time	UCI World Tour Points
1	Rigoberto Urán (COL)	Etixx–Quick-Step	5h 09' 47"	80
2	Michael Matthews (AUS)	Orica–GreenEDGE	s.t.	60
3	Alexander Kristoff (NOR)	Team Katusha	s.t.	50
4	Tom-Jelte Slagter (NED)	Cannondale–Garmin	s.t.	40
5	Diego Ulissi (ITA)	Lampre–Merida	s.t.	30
6	Bauke Mollema (NED)	Trek Factory Racing	s.t.	22
7	Philippe Gilbert (BEL)	BMC Racing Team	s.t.	14
8	Tony Gallopin (FRA)	Lotto–Soudal	s.t.	10
9	Warren Barguil (FRA)	Team Giant–Alpecin	s.t.	6
10	Greg Van Avermaet (BEL)	BMC Racing Team	s.t.	2
