= 2015 Tour of the Basque Country =

2015 UCI World Tour, race 9 of 28

Race details
- Dates: 6–11 April 2015
- Stages: 6
- Winning time: 21h 49' 38"

Results
Jersey awarded to the overall winner	Winner	Joaquim Rodríguez (ESP)	(Team Katusha)
	Second	Sergio Henao (COL)	(Team Sky)
	Third	Ion Izagirre (ESP)	(Movistar Team)
Jersey awarded to the points classification winner	Points	Joaquim Rodríguez (ESP)	(Team Katusha)
Jersey awarded to the mountains classification winner	Mountains	Omar Fraile (ESP)	(Caja Rural–Seguros RGA)
Jersey awarded to the sprints classification winner	Sprints	Louis Vervaeke (BEL)	(Lotto–Soudal)
	Team	Team Katusha	

The 2015 Tour of the Basque Country was the 55th edition of the Tour of the Basque Country stage race. It took place from 6 to 11 April and was the ninth race of the 2015 UCI World Tour. The race was won by Joaquim Rodríguez.

== Schedule ==
List of stages
Stage	Date	Course	Distance	Type	Winner
1	6 April	Bilbao to Bilbao	162.7 km (101 mi)	Intermediate stage	Michael Matthews (AUS)
2	7 April	Bilbao to Vitoria-Gasteiz	175.4 km (109 mi)	Intermediate stage	Fabio Felline (ITA)
3	8 April	Vitoria-Gasteiz to Zumarraga	170.7 km (106 mi)	Intermediate stage	Joaquim Rodríguez (ESP)
4	9 April	Zumarraga to Arrate (Eibar)	162.2 km (101 mi)	Mountain stage	Joaquim Rodríguez (ESP)
5	10 April	Eibar to Aia	155.5 km (97 mi)	Intermediate stage	Mikel Landa (ESP)
6	11 April	Aia to Aia	18.3 km (11 mi)	Individual time trial	Tom Dumoulin (NED)

== Teams ==
As the Tour of the Basque Country was a UCI World Tour event, all 17 UCI WorldTeams were invited automatically and were obliged to send a squad. Two Professional Continental teams received wildcard invitations.

UCI WorldTeams

- AG2R La Mondiale
- Astana
- BMC Racing Team
- Etixx–Quick-Step
- FDJ
- IAM Cycling
- Lampre–Merida
- Lotto–Soudal
- Movistar Team
- Orica–GreenEDGE
- Cannondale–Garmin
- Team Giant–Alpecin
- Team Katusha
- LottoNL–Jumbo
- Team Sky
- Tinkoff–Saxo
- Trek Factory Racing

UCI Professional Continental teams

- Cofidis
- Caja Rural–Seguros RGA

== Stages ==
=== Stage 1 ===
6 April 2015 — Bilbao to Bilbao, 162.7 km (101.1 mi)

Stage 1 result and general classification after stage 1
Rank	Rider	Team	Time
1	Michael Matthews (AUS)	Orica–GreenEDGE	3h 57' 07"
2	Michał Kwiatkowski (POL)	Etixx–Quick-Step	+ 0"
3	Ilnur Zakarin (RUS)	Team Katusha	+ 0"
4	Kévin Reza (FRA)	FDJ	+ 0"
5	Tony Gallopin (FRA)	Lotto–Soudal	+ 0"
6	Julien Simon (FRA)	Cofidis	+ 0"
7	Fabio Felline (ITA)	Trek Factory Racing	+ 0"
8	Valerio Agnoli (ITA)	Astana	+ 0"
9	Petr Vakoč (CZE)	Etixx–Quick-Step	+ 0"
10	Daniel Moreno (ESP)	Team Katusha	+ 0"

=== Stage 2 ===
7 April 2015 — Bilbao to Vitoria-Gasteiz, 175.4 km (109.0 mi)

Stage 2 result
Rank	Rider	Team	Time
1	Fabio Felline (ITA)	Trek Factory Racing	4h 32' 32"
2	Michael Matthews (AUS)	Orica–GreenEDGE	+ 0"
3	Tony Gallopin (FRA)	Lotto–Soudal	+ 0"
4	Michał Kwiatkowski (POL)	Etixx–Quick-Step	+ 0"
5	Philippe Gilbert (BEL)	BMC Racing Team	+ 0"
6	Kévin Reza (FRA)	FDJ	+ 0"
7	Julien Simon (FRA)	Cofidis	+ 0"
8	Pello Bilbao (ESP)	Caja Rural–Seguros RGA	+ 0"
9	Valerio Agnoli (ITA)	Astana	+ 0"
10	Gianni Meersman (BEL)	Etixx–Quick-Step	+ 0"

General classification after stage 2
Rank	Rider	Team	Time
1	Michael Matthews (AUS)	Orica–GreenEDGE	8h 29' 39"
2	Michał Kwiatkowski (POL)	Etixx–Quick-Step	+ 0"
3	Fabio Felline (ITA)	Trek Factory Racing	+ 0"
4	Tony Gallopin (FRA)	Lotto–Soudal	+ 0"
5	Kévin Reza (FRA)	FDJ	+ 0"
6	Julien Simon (FRA)	Cofidis	+ 0"
7	Valerio Agnoli (ITA)	Astana	+ 0"
8	Pello Bilbao (ESP)	Caja Rural–Seguros RGA	+ 0"
9	Daniel Moreno (ESP)	Team Katusha	+ 0"
10	Petr Vakoč (CZE)	Etixx–Quick-Step	+ 0"

=== Stage 3 ===
8 April 2015 — Vitoria-Gasteiz to Zumarraga, 170.7 km (106.1 mi)

Stage 3 result
Rank	Rider	Team	Time
1	Joaquim Rodríguez (ESP)	Team Katusha	4h 39' 02"
2	Sergio Henao (COL)	Team Sky	+ 0"
3	Nairo Quintana (COL)	Movistar Team	+ 0"
4	Michał Kwiatkowski (POL)	Etixx–Quick-Step	+ 7"
5	Rafał Majka (POL)	Tinkoff–Saxo	+ 7"
6	Michele Scarponi (ITA)	Astana	+ 7"
7	Samuel Sánchez (ESP)	BMC Racing Team	+ 7"
8	Simon Yates (GBR)	Orica–GreenEDGE	+ 10"
9	Simon Špilak (SLO)	Team Katusha	+ 10"
10	Tejay van Garderen (USA)	BMC Racing Team	+ 10"

General classification after stage 3
Rank	Rider	Team	Time
1	Sergio Henao (COL)	Team Sky	13h 08' 41"
2	Joaquim Rodríguez (ESP)	Team Katusha	+ 0"
3	Nairo Quintana (COL)	Movistar Team	+ 0"
4	Michał Kwiatkowski (POL)	Etixx–Quick-Step	+ 7"
5	Samuel Sánchez (ESP)	BMC Racing Team	+ 7"
6	Rafał Majka (POL)	Tinkoff–Saxo	+ 7"
7	Michele Scarponi (ITA)	Astana	+ 7"
8	Daniel Moreno (ESP)	Team Katusha	+ 10"
9	Alexis Vuillermoz (FRA)	AG2R La Mondiale	+ 10"
10	Tejay van Garderen (USA)	BMC Racing Team	+ 10"

=== Stage 4 ===
9 April 2015 — Zumarraga to Arrate (Eibar), 162.2 km (100.8 mi)

Stage 4 result
Rank	Rider	Team	Time
1	Joaquim Rodríguez (ESP)	Team Katusha	4h 05' 10"
2	Bauke Mollema (NED)	Trek Factory Racing	+ 0"
3	Simon Yates (GBR)	Orica–GreenEDGE	+ 0"
4	Ion Izagirre (ESP)	Movistar Team	+ 0"
5	Sergio Henao (COL)	Team Sky	+ 0"
6	Michele Scarponi (ITA)	Astana	+ 0"
7	Nairo Quintana (COL)	Movistar Team	+ 0"
8	Ilnur Zakarin (RUS)	Team Katusha	+ 0"
9	Rui Costa (POR)	Lampre–Merida	+ 0"
10	Thibaut Pinot (FRA)	FDJ	+ 0"

General classification after stage 4
Rank	Rider	Team	Time
1	Sergio Henao (COL)	Team Sky	17h 13' 51"
2	Joaquim Rodríguez (ESP)	Team Katusha	+ 0"
3	Nairo Quintana (COL)	Movistar Team	+ 0"
4	Michele Scarponi (ITA)	Astana	+ 7"
5	Bauke Mollema (NED)	Trek Factory Racing	+ 10"
6	Ilnur Zakarin (RUS)	Team Katusha	+ 10"
7	Tejay van Garderen (USA)	BMC Racing Team	+ 10"
8	Ion Izagirre (ESP)	Movistar Team	+ 10"
9	Simon Yates (GBR)	Orica–GreenEDGE	+ 10"
10	Simon Špilak (SLO)	Team Katusha	+ 10"

=== Stage 5 ===
10 April 2015 — Eibar to Aia, 155.5 km (96.6 mi)

Stage 5 result
Rank	Rider	Team	Time
1	Mikel Landa (ESP)	Astana	4h 06' 01"
2	Tim Wellens (BEL)	Lotto–Soudal	+ 3"
3	Tom Danielson (USA)	Cannondale–Garmin	+ 16"
4	Rein Taaramäe (EST)	Astana	+ 28"
5	Tony Gallopin (FRA)	Lotto–Soudal	+ 38"
6	Simon Yates (GBR)	Orica–GreenEDGE	+ 53"
7	Sergio Henao (COL)	Team Sky	+ 56"
8	Joaquim Rodríguez (ESP)	Team Katusha	+ 56"
9	Tom-Jelte Slagter (NED)	Cannondale–Garmin	+ 1' 05"
10	Alexis Vuillermoz (FRA)	AG2R La Mondiale	+ 1' 06"

General classification after stage 5
Rank	Rider	Team	Time
1	Sergio Henao (COL)	Team Sky	21h 20' 48"
2	Joaquim Rodríguez (ESP)	Team Katusha	+ 0"
3	Simon Yates (GBR)	Orica–GreenEDGE	+ 7"
4	Nairo Quintana (COL)	Movistar Team	+ 12"
5	Michele Scarponi (ITA)	Astana	+ 22"
6	Simon Špilak (SLO)	Team Katusha	+ 22"
7	Ilnur Zakarin (RUS)	Team Katusha	+ 28"
8	Ion Izagirre (ESP)	Movistar Team	+ 28"
9	Tejay van Garderen (USA)	BMC Racing Team	+ 36"
10	Thibaut Pinot (FRA)	FDJ	+ 36"

=== Stage 6 ===
11 April 2015 — Aia to Aia, 18.3 km (11.4 mi), individual time trial (ITT)

Stage 6 result
Rank	Rider	Team	Time
1	Tom Dumoulin (NED)	Team Giant–Alpecin	28' 46"
2	Joaquim Rodríguez (ESP)	Team Katusha	+ 4"
3	Ion Izagirre (ESP)	Movistar Team	+ 5"
4	Sergio Henao (COL)	Team Sky	+ 17"
5	Beñat Intxausti (ESP)	Movistar Team	+ 21"
6	Fabio Felline (ITA)	Trek Factory Racing	+ 23"
7	Nairo Quintana (COL)	Movistar Team	+ 30"
8	Rui Costa (POR)	Lampre–Merida	+ 34"
9	Rein Taaramäe (EST)	Astana	+ 36"
10	Michał Kwiatkowski (POL)	Etixx–Quick-Step	+ 37"

Final general classification
Rank	Rider	Team	Time
1	Joaquim Rodríguez (ESP)	Team Katusha	21h 49' 38"
2	Sergio Henao (COL)	Team Sky	+ 13"
3	Ion Izagirre (ESP)	Movistar Team	+ 29"
4	Nairo Quintana (COL)	Movistar Team	+ 38"
5	Simon Yates (GBR)	Orica–GreenEDGE	+ 46"
6	Michele Scarponi (ITA)	Astana	+ 1' 06"
7	Rui Costa (POR)	Lampre–Merida	+ 1' 14"
8	Michał Kwiatkowski (POL)	Etixx–Quick-Step	+ 1' 15"
9	Ilnur Zakarin (RUS)	Team Katusha	+ 1' 25"
10	Thibaut Pinot (FRA)	FDJ	+ 1' 33"

== Classification leadership table ==
In the Tour of the Basque Country, four different jerseys were awarded. For the general classification, calculated by adding each cyclist's finishing times on each stage, the leader received a yellow jersey. This classification was considered the most important of the Tour of the Basque Country, and the winner of the classification was the winner of the race.

Additionally, there was a points classification, which awarded a white jersey. In the points classification, cyclists received points for finishing in the top 15 in a stage. For winning a stage, a rider earned 25 points, second place earned 20 points, third 16, fourth 14, fifth 12, sixth 10, and one point fewer per place down to a single point for 15th. There was also a mountains classification, the leadership of which was marked by a red jersey with white dots. In the mountains classification, points were won by reaching the top of a climb before other cyclists, with more points available for the higher-categorised climbs.

The fourth jersey represented the sprints classification, marked by a blue jersey. In the sprints classification, cyclists received points for finishing in the top 3 at intermediate sprint points during each stage, with the exception of the final individual time trial stage. There was also a classification for teams, in which the times of the best three cyclists per team on each stage were added together; the leading team at the end of the race was the team with the lowest total time.

Stage	Winner	General classification	Points classification	Mountains classification	Sprints classification	Teams classification
1	Michael Matthews	Michael Matthews	Michael Matthews	Omar Fraile	Omar Fraile	Etixx–Quick-Step
2	Fabio Felline	Michael Matthews	Michael Matthews	Amets Txurruka	Louis Vervaeke	Etixx–Quick-Step
3	Joaquim Rodríguez	Sergio Henao	Michał Kwiatkowski	Omar Fraile	Omar Fraile	Team Katusha
4	Joaquim Rodríguez	Sergio Henao	Michał Kwiatkowski	Omar Fraile	Omar Fraile	Team Katusha
5	Mikel Landa	Sergio Henao	Joaquim Rodríguez	Omar Fraile	Louis Vervaeke	Team Katusha
6	Tom Dumoulin	Joaquim Rodríguez	Joaquim Rodríguez	Omar Fraile	Louis Vervaeke	Team Katusha
Final		Joaquim Rodríguez	Joaquim Rodríguez	Omar Fraile	Louis Vervaeke	Team Katusha
