= 2015 Volta a Catalunya =

Cycling race

2015 UCI World Tour, race 5 of 28

Race details
- Dates: 23–29 March 2015
- Stages: 7
- Distance: 1,238.1 km (769.3 mi)
- Winning time: 30h 30' 30"

Results
Jersey awarded to the overall winner	Winner	Richie Porte (AUS)	(Team Sky)
	Second	Alejandro Valverde (ESP)	(Movistar Team)
	Third	Domenico Pozzovivo (ITA)	(AG2R La Mondiale)
Jersey awarded to the mountains classification winner	Mountains	Tom Danielson (USA)	(Cannondale–Garmin)
Jersey awarded to the youth classification winner	Youth	Wilco Kelderman (NED)	(LottoNL–Jumbo)
Jersey awarded to the sprints classification winner	Sprints	Lluís Mas (ESP)	(Caja Rural–Seguros RGA)
	Team	BMC Racing Team	

The 2015 Volta a Catalunya was the 95th edition of the Volta a Catalunya stage race. It took place from 23 to 29 March and was the fifth race of the 2015 UCI World Tour. Defending champion Joaquim Rodríguez was scheduled to defend his title, but was pulled from the event days before it was due to start citing a stomach virus. The race was won by Richie Porte (Team Sky), his second race win of the season, with Alejandro Valverde (Movistar Team) in second and Domenico Pozzovivo (AG2R La Mondiale) in third.

== Route ==
Stage characteristics and winners
Stage	Date	Course	Distance	Type	Winner
1	23 March	Calella to Calella	185.2 km (115 mi)	Medium-mountain stage	Maciej Paterski (POL)
2	24 March	Mataró to Olot	191.8 km (119 mi)	Medium-mountain stage	Alejandro Valverde (ESP)
3	25 March	Girona to Girona	156.6 km (97 mi)	Medium-mountain stage	Domenico Pozzovivo (ITA)
4	26 March	Tona to La Molina	188.4 km (117 mi)	Mountain stage	Tejay van Garderen (USA)
5	27 March	Alp to Valls	195.4 km (121 mi)	Medium-mountain stage	Alejandro Valverde (ESP)
6	28 March	Cervera to PortAventura	194.1 km (121 mi)	Medium-mountain stage	Sergey Chernetskiy (RUS)
7	29 March	Barcelona to Barcelona	126.6 km (79 mi)	Flat stage	Alejandro Valverde (ESP)

== Participating teams ==
The Volta a Catalunya is part of the UCI World Tour, which meant that the 17 UCI WorldTeams were automatically invited and obliged to send a team. The race organisers also made seven wildcard invitations to UCI Professional Continental teams. The peloton was therefore made up of 24 teams.

UCI WorldTeams

- AG2R La Mondiale
- Astana
- BMC Racing Team
- Etixx–Quick-Step
- FDJ
- IAM Cycling
- Lampre–Merida
- Lotto–Soudal
- Movistar Team
- Orica–GreenEDGE
- Cannondale–Garmin
- Team Giant–Alpecin
- Team Katusha
- LottoNL–Jumbo
- Team Sky
- Tinkoff–Saxo
- Trek Factory Racing

UCI Professional Continental teams

- Bretagne–Séché Environnement
- Caja Rural–Seguros RGA
- CCC–Sprandi–Polkowice
- Cofidis
- Colombia
- Team Europcar
- Wanty–Groupe Gobert

== Stages ==
=== Stage 1 ===
23 March 2015 — Calella to Calella, 185.2 km (115.1 mi)

Stage 1 result
Rank	Rider	Team	Time
1	Maciej Paterski (POL)	CCC–Sprandi–Polkowice	4h 33' 41"
2	Pierre Rolland (FRA)	Team Europcar	+ 0"
3	Bart De Clercq (BEL)	Lotto–Soudal	+ 2"
4	Tosh Van der Sande (BEL)	Lotto–Soudal	+ 2' 40"
5	Julian Alaphilippe (FRA)	Etixx–Quick-Step	+ 2' 40"
6	Paolo Tiralongo (ITA)	Astana	+ 2' 40"
7	Enrico Gasparotto (ITA)	Wanty–Groupe Gobert	+ 2' 40"
8	Bryan Coquard (FRA)	Team Europcar	+ 2' 40"
9	Carlos Barbero (ESP)	Caja Rural–Seguros RGA	+ 2' 40"
10	Julien Simon (FRA)	Cofidis	+ 2' 40"

General classification after stage 1
Rank	Rider	Team	Time
1	Maciej Paterski (POL)	CCC–Sprandi–Polkowice	4h 33' 31"
2	Pierre Rolland (FRA)	Team Europcar	+ 4"
3	Bart De Clercq (BEL)	Lotto–Soudal	+ 8"
4	Wout Poels (NED)	Team Sky	+ 2' 47"
5	Nicolas Roche (IRE)	Team Sky	+ 2' 48"
6	Dan Martin (IRE)	Cannondale–Garmin	+ 2' 49"
7	Tosh Van der Sande (BEL)	Lotto–Soudal	+ 2' 50"
8	Julian Alaphilippe (FRA)	Etixx–Quick-Step	+ 2' 50"
9	Paolo Tiralongo (ITA)	Astana	+ 2' 50"
10	Enrico Gasparotto (ITA)	Wanty–Groupe Gobert	+ 2' 50"

=== Stage 2 ===
24 March 2015 — Mataró to Olot, 191.8 km (119.2 mi)

Stage 2 result
Rank	Rider	Team	Time
1	Alejandro Valverde (ESP)	Movistar Team	5h 02' 49"
2	José Joaquín Rojas (ESP)	Movistar Team	+ 0"
3	Martin Elmiger (SUI)	IAM Cycling	+ 0"
4	Jonathan Hivert (FRA)	Bretagne–Séché Environnement	+ 0"
5	Wilco Kelderman (NED)	LottoNL–Jumbo	+ 0"
6	Julien Simon (FRA)	Cofidis	+ 0"
7	Eduard Prades (ESP)	Caja Rural–Seguros RGA	+ 0"
8	Fábio Silvestre (POR)	Trek Factory Racing	+ 0"
9	Pavel Kochetkov (RUS)	Team Katusha	+ 0"
10	Davide Malacarne (ITA)	Astana	+ 0"

General classification after stage 2
Rank	Rider	Team	Time
1	Maciej Paterski (POL)	CCC–Sprandi–Polkowice	9h 36' 20"
2	Pierre Rolland (FRA)	Team Europcar	+ 4"
3	Bart De Clercq (BEL)	Lotto–Soudal	+ 8"
4	Alejandro Valverde (ESP)	Movistar Team	+ 2' 40"
5	José Joaquín Rojas (ESP)	Movistar Team	+ 2' 44"
6	Martin Elmiger (SUI)	IAM Cycling	+ 2' 46"
7	Wout Poels (NED)	Team Sky	+ 2' 47"
8	Nicolas Roche (IRE)	Team Sky	+ 2' 48"
9	Dan Martin (IRE)	Cannondale–Garmin	+ 2' 49"
10	Julien Simon (FRA)	Cofidis	+ 2' 50"

=== Stage 3 ===
25 March 2015 — Girona to Girona, 156.6 km (97.3 mi)

Stage 3 result
Rank	Rider	Team	Time
1	Domenico Pozzovivo (ITA)	AG2R La Mondiale	3h 52' 37"
2	Rigoberto Urán (COL)	Etixx–Quick-Step	+ 3"
3	Dan Martin (IRL)	Cannondale–Garmin	+ 3"
4	Alberto Contador (ESP)	Tinkoff–Saxo	+ 3"
5	Fabio Aru (ITA)	Astana	+ 3"
6	Richie Porte (AUS)	Team Sky	+ 3"
7	Andrew Talansky (USA)	Cannondale–Garmin	+ 3"
8	Diego Rosa (ITA)	Astana	+ 22"
9	Wilco Kelderman (NED)	LottoNL–Jumbo	+ 22"
10	Alberto Losada (ESP)	Team Katusha	+ 22"

General classification after stage 3
Rank	Rider	Team	Time
1	Pierre Rolland (FRA)	Team Europcar	13h 29' 23"
2	Maciej Paterski (POL)	CCC–Sprandi–Polkowice	+ 1' 08"
3	Bart De Clercq (BEL)	Lotto–Soudal	+ 1' 16"
4	Domenico Pozzovivo (ITA)	AG2R La Mondiale	+ 2' 14"
5	Rigoberto Urán (COL)	Etixx–Quick-Step	+ 2' 21"
6	Dan Martin (IRL)	Cannondale–Garmin	+ 2' 22"
7	Alberto Contador (ESP)	Tinkoff–Saxo	+ 2' 27"
8	Richie Porte (AUS)	Team Sky	+ 2' 27"
9	Fabio Aru (ITA)	Astana	+ 2' 27"
10	Andrew Talansky (USA)	Cannondale–Garmin	+ 2' 27"

=== Stage 4 ===
26 March 2015 — Tona to La Molina, 188.4 km (117.1 mi)

Stage 4 result
Rank	Rider	Team	Time
1	Tejay van Garderen (USA)	BMC Racing Team	5h 00' 36"
2	Richie Porte (AUS)	Team Sky	+ 3"
3	Alberto Contador (ESP)	Tinkoff–Saxo	+ 8"
4	Dan Martin (IRL)	Cannondale–Garmin	+ 8"
5	Wilco Kelderman (NED)	LottoNL–Jumbo	+ 8"
6	Darwin Atapuma (COL)	BMC Racing Team	+ 11"
7	Domenico Pozzovivo (ITA)	AG2R La Mondiale	+ 15"
8	Alejandro Valverde (ESP)	Movistar Team	+ 19"
9	Vasil Kiryienka (BLR)	Team Sky	+ 21"
10	Rafael Valls (ESP)	Lampre–Merida	+ 21"

General classification after stage 4
Rank	Rider	Team	Time
1	Bart De Clercq (BEL)	Lotto–Soudal	18h 32' 02"
2	Richie Porte (AUS)	Team Sky	+ 21"
3	Domenico Pozzovivo (ITA)	AG2R La Mondiale	+ 26"
4	Dan Martin (IRL)	Cannondale–Garmin	+ 27"
5	Alberto Contador (ESP)	Tinkoff–Saxo	+ 28"
6	Rigoberto Urán (COL)	Etixx–Quick-Step	+ 45"
7	Fabio Aru (ITA)	Astana	+ 48"
8	Wilco Kelderman (NED)	LottoNL–Jumbo	+ 51"
9	Alejandro Valverde (ESP)	Movistar Team	+ 52"
10	Darwin Atapuma (COL)	BMC Racing Team	+ 54"

=== Stage 5 ===
27 March 2015 — Alp to Valls, 195.4 km (121.4 mi)

Stage 5 result
Rank	Rider	Team	Time
1	Alejandro Valverde (ESP)	Movistar Team	4h 25' 52"
2	Rigoberto Urán (COL)	Etixx–Quick-Step	+ 5"
3	Paolo Tiralongo (ITA)	Astana	+ 5"
4	Richie Porte (AUS)	Team Sky	+ 5"
5	Fabio Aru (ITA)	Astana	+ 5"
6	Domenico Pozzovivo (ITA)	AG2R La Mondiale	+ 5"
7	Alberto Contador (ESP)	Tinkoff–Saxo	+ 5"
8	David López (ESP)	Team Sky	+ 12"
9	Darwin Atapuma (COL)	BMC Racing Team	+ 5" (Note: Darwin Atapuma, Tejay van Garderen and Rafael Valls were given the time of the first finishing group.)
10	Tejay van Garderen (USA)	BMC Racing Team	+ 5"

General classification after stage 5
Rank	Rider	Team	Time
1	Richie Porte (AUS)	Team Sky	22h 58' 20"
2	Domenico Pozzovivo (ITA)	AG2R La Mondiale	+ 5"
3	Alberto Contador (ESP)	Tinkoff–Saxo	+ 7"
4	Alejandro Valverde (ESP)	Movistar Team	+ 16"
5	Rigoberto Urán (COL)	Etixx–Quick-Step	+ 18"
6	Fabio Aru (ITA)	Astana	+ 27"
7	Darwin Atapuma (COL)	BMC Racing Team	+ 33"
8	Rafael Valls (ESP)	Lampre–Merida	+ 43"
9	Wilco Kelderman (NED)	LottoNL–Jumbo	+ 1' 09"
10	Dan Martin (IRL)	Cannondale–Garmin	+ 1' 35"

=== Stage 6 ===
28 March 2015 — Cervera to PortAventura, 194.1 km (121 mi)

Stage 6 result
Rank	Rider	Team	Time
1	Sergey Chernetskiy (RUS)	Team Katusha	4h 42' 47"
2	Julian Alaphilippe (FRA)	Etixx–Quick-Step	+ 0"
3	Maciej Paterski (POL)	CCC–Sprandi–Polkowice	+ 0"
4	Marc Soler (ESP)	Movistar Team	+ 0"
5	Jonathan Hivert (FRA)	Bretagne–Séché Environnement	+ 0"
6	Tejay van Garderen (USA)	BMC Racing Team	+ 0"
7	Georg Preidler (AUT)	Team Giant–Alpecin	+ 0"
8	Rudy Molard (FRA)	Cofidis	+ 0"
9	Tom Danielson (USA)	Cannondale–Garmin	+ 3"
10	Carlos Verona (ESP)	Etixx–Quick-Step	+ 3"

General classification after stage 6
Rank	Rider	Team	Time
1	Richie Porte (AUS)	Team Sky	27h 42' 57"
2	Domenico Pozzovivo (ITA)	AG2R La Mondiale	+ 5"
3	Alberto Contador (ESP)	Tinkoff–Saxo	+ 7"
4	Alejandro Valverde (ESP)	Movistar Team	+ 16"
5	Rigoberto Urán (COL)	Etixx–Quick-Step	+ 18"
6	Fabio Aru (ITA)	Astana	+ 27"
7	Darwin Atapuma (COL)	BMC Racing Team	+ 33"
8	Rafael Valls (ESP)	Lampre–Merida	+ 43"
9	Wilco Kelderman (NED)	LottoNL–Jumbo	+ 1' 09"
10	Dan Martin (IRL)	Cannondale–Garmin	+ 1' 35"

=== Stage 7 ===
29 March 2015 — Barcelona to Barcelona, 126.6 km (79 mi)

Stage 7 result
Rank	Rider	Team	Time
1	Alejandro Valverde (ESP)	Movistar Team	2h 47' 33"
2	Bryan Coquard (FRA)	Team Europcar	+ 0"
3	Sergey Chernetskiy (RUS)	Team Katusha	+ 0"
4	Jarlinson Pantano (COL)	IAM Cycling	+ 0"
5	Romain Hardy (FRA)	Cofidis	+ 0"
6	José Joaquín Rojas (ESP)	Movistar Team	+ 0"
7	Rigoberto Urán (COL)	Etixx–Quick-Step	+ 0"
8	Domenico Pozzovivo (ITA)	AG2R La Mondiale	+ 0"
9	Rafael Valls (ESP)	Lampre–Merida	+ 0"
10	Gianluca Brambilla (ITA)	Etixx–Quick-Step	+ 0"

Final general classification
Rank	Rider	Team	Time
1	Richie Porte (AUS)	Team Sky	30h 30' 30"
2	Alejandro Valverde (ESP)	Movistar Team	+ 4"
3	Domenico Pozzovivo (ITA)	AG2R La Mondiale	+ 5"
4	Alberto Contador (ESP)	Tinkoff–Saxo	+ 7"
5	Rigoberto Urán (COL)	Etixx–Quick-Step	+ 18"
6	Fabio Aru (ITA)	Astana	+ 27"
7	Darwin Atapuma (COL)	BMC Racing Team	+ 33"
8	Rafael Valls (ESP)	Lampre–Merida	+ 43"
9	Wilco Kelderman (NED)	LottoNL–Jumbo	+ 1' 09"
10	Dan Martin (IRL)	Cannondale–Garmin	+ 1' 35"

== Classification leadership table ==
In the 2015 Volta a Catalunya, four different jerseys were awarded. For the general classification, calculated by adding each cyclist's finishing times on each stage, and allowing time bonuses in intermediate sprints (3, 2 and 1 seconds) and at the finish in mass-start stages (10, 6 and 4 seconds respectively for the first three finishers), the leader received a white and green jersey. This classification was considered the most important of the 2015 Volta a Catalunya, and the winner of the classification was considered the winner of the race.

Additionally, there was a sprints classification, which awarded a white jersey. In the sprints classification, cyclists received points for finishing in the top 3 at intermediate sprint points during each stage; these intermediate sprints also offered bonus seconds towards the general classification. There was also a mountains classification, the leadership of which was marked by a red jersey. In the mountains classification, points were won by reaching the top of a climb before other cyclists, with more points available for the higher-categorised climbs.

There was also a classification for teams, in which the times of the best three cyclists per team on each stage were added together; the leading team at the end of the race was the team with the lowest total time.

Stage	Winner	General classification	Mountains classification	Sprints classification	Young rider classification	Teams classification
1	Maciej Paterski	Maciej Paterski	Maciej Paterski	Martijn Keizer	Carlos Barbero	Team Europcar
2	Alejandro Valverde	Maciej Paterski	Maciej Paterski	Lluís Mas	Wilco Kelderman	Team Europcar
3	Domenico Pozzovivo	Pierre Rolland	Maciej Paterski	Lluís Mas	Wilco Kelderman	Team Europcar
4	Tejay van Garderen	Bart De Clercq	Tom Danielson	Lluís Mas	Wilco Kelderman	Team Sky
5	Alejandro Valverde	Richie Porte	Tom Danielson	Lluís Mas	Wilco Kelderman	Team Sky
6	Sergey Chernetskiy	Richie Porte	Tom Danielson	Lluís Mas	Wilco Kelderman	BMC Racing Team
7	Alejandro Valverde	Richie Porte	Tom Danielson	Lluís Mas	Wilco Kelderman	BMC Racing Team
Final		Richie Porte	Tom Danielson	Lluís Mas	Wilco Kelderman	BMC Racing Team
