= 2015 UCI America Tour =

- Eleventh edition of the UCI America Tour

Details
- Dates: 9 January 2015–25 December 2015
- Location: North America and South America
- Races: 32

Champions
- Individual champion: Toms Skujiņš (LAT) (Hincapie Racing Team)
- Teams' champion: Optum–Kelly Benefit Strategies
- Nations' champion: Colombia

The 2015 UCI America Tour was the eleventh season for the UCI America Tour. The season began on 9 January 2015 with the Vuelta al Táchira and ended on 25 December 2015 with the Vuelta a Costa Rica.

The points leader, based on the cumulative results of previous races, wears the UCI America Tour cycling jersey. Throughout the season, points are awarded to the top finishers of stages within stage races and the final general classification standings of each of the stages races and one-day events. The quality and complexity of a race also determines how many points are awarded to the top finishers, the higher the UCI rating of a race, the more points are awarded.

The UCI ratings from highest to lowest are as follows:

- Multi-day events: 2.HC, 2.1 and 2.2
- One-day events: 1.HC, 1.1 and 1.2

== Events ==
Date	Race Name	Location	UCI Rating	Winner	Team	Ref
9–18 January	Vuelta al Táchira	Venezuela	2.2	José Rujano (VEN)	Gobernación de Mérida	
19–25 January	Tour de San Luis	Argentina	2.1	Daniel Díaz (ARG)	Carrefour Funvic Soul Cycling Team	
22 February–1 March	Vuelta a la Independencia Nacional	Dominican Republic	2.2	Robigzon Oyola (COL)	EPM–UNE–Área Metropolitana	
27 March–5 April	Vuelta al Uruguay	Uruguay	2.2	Carlos Oyarzun (CHI)	Chile (national team)	
8–12 April	Volta do Rio Grande do Sul	Brazil	2.2	Byron Guamá (ECU)	Movistar Team Ecuador	
23–26 April	Joe Martin Stage Race	United States	2.2	John Murphy (USA)	UnitedHealthcare	
28 April–3 May	Vuelta Mexico	Mexico	2.2	Francisco Colorado (COL)	Canel's-Specialized	
29 April–3 May	Tour of the Gila	United States	2.2	Rob Britton (CAN)	Team SmartStop	
7 May	Pan American Championships - Time Trial	Mexico	CC	Carlos Oyarzun (CHI)	Keith Mobel-Partisan	
10 May	Pan American Championships - Road Race	Mexico	CC	Byron Guamá (ECU)	Movistar Team Ecuador	
10–17 May	Tour of California	United States	2.HC	Peter Sagan (SVK)	Tinkoff–Saxo	
16 May	Copa Federación Venezolana de Ciclismo	Venezuela	1.2	Honorio Machado (VEN)	Gobierno Bolivariano de Nueva Esparta	
17 May	Clasico FVCiclismo Corre Por la VIDA	Venezuela	1.2	Miguel Ubeto (VEN)	Gobierno Bolivariano de Nueva Esparta	
27–31 May	Volta Ciclística Internacional do Paraná	Brazil	2.2	Rodrigo Araújo (BRA)	Green Piracicaba	
28–31 May	Grand Prix Cycliste de Saguenay	Canada	2.2	Matteo Dal-Cin (CAN)	Silber Pro Cycling Team	
31 May	Winston-Salem Cycling Classic	United States	1.2	Toms Skujiņš (LAT)	Hincapie Racing Team	
7 June	Philadelphia International Championship	United States	1.2	Carlos Barbero (ESP)	Caja Rural–Seguros RGA	
10–14 June	Tour de Beauce	Canada	2.2	Pello Bilbao (ESP)	Caja Rural–Seguros RGA	
12–21 June	Vuelta Ciclista a Venezuela	Venezuela	2.2	José Alarcón (VEN)	Lotería del Táchira	
12 July	White Spot / Delta Road Race	Canada	1.2	Eric Young (USA)	Optum–Kelly Benefit Strategies	
2–15 August	Vuelta a Colombia	Colombia	2.2	Óscar Sevilla (ESP)	EPM–UNE–Área Metropolitana	
3–9 August	Tour of Utah	United States	2.HC	Joe Dombrowski (USA)	Cannondale–Garmin	
16 August	International Road Cycling Challenge	Brazil	1.2	Alexis Vuillermoz (FRA)	France (national team)	
17–23 August	USA Pro Cycling Challenge	United States	2.HC	Rohan Dennis (AUS)	BMC Racing Team	
25–30 August	Tour do Rio	Brazil	2.2	Gustavo César (ESP)	W52–Quinta da Lixa	
2–7 September	Tour of Alberta	Canada	2.1	Bauke Mollema (NED)	Trek Factory Racing	
12 September	The Reading 120	United States	1.2	Daniel Summerhill (USA)	UnitedHealthcare	
4 October	Tobago Cycling Classic	Trinidad and Tobago	1.2	Adderlyn Cruz (DOM)	Inteja–MMR Dominican Cycling Team	
26 October–1 November	Vuelta a Guatemala	Guatemala	2.2	Román Villalobos (CRC)	Nestlé-Giant	
15 November	Copa América de Ciclismo	Brazil	1.2	Carlos Manarelli (BRA)	Carrefour Funvic Soul Cycling Team	
14–25 December	Vuelta a Costa Rica	Costa Rica	2.2	Juan Carlos Rojas (CRC)	Frijoles Los Tierniticos-Arroz Halcón-Roes	

== Standings ==
Standings as of November 25th.

Rank	Name	Team	Points
1.	Toms Skujiņš (LAT)	Hincapie Racing	208.4
2.	Byron Guamá (ECU)	Movistar Team Ecuador	198
3.	Michael Woods (CAN)	Optum-Kelly Benefit Strategies	179
4.	Daniel Díaz (ARG)	Carrefour Funvic Soul Cycling Team	158
5.	Óscar Sevilla (SPA)	EPM-UNE-Área Metropolitana	136.6
6.	William Chiarello (BRA)		135
7.	Miguel Ubeto (VEN)		129
8.	Manuel Rodas (GUA)		126
9.	Kiel Reijnen (USA)	UnitedHealthcare	124
10.	Rob Britton (CAN)	Team SmartStop	112

Rank	Team	Points
1.	Optum-Kelly Benefit Strategies	494
2.	Carrefour Funvic Soul Cycling Team	481
3.	Hincapie Racing	400
4.	UnitedHealthcare	343
5.	EPM-UNE-Área Metropolitana	332.2

Rank	Nation	Points
1	Colombia	890.35
2	Canada	850
3	Argentina	788
4	United States	687
5	Venezuela	682
