= Italian National Time Trial Championships =

National road cycling championship in Italy

The Italian National Time Trial Championships are held annually to decide the Italian time trial champions across several categories of rider. Marco Pinotti has the most wins with 6 (4 in row). Marco Velo also had 3 wins in a row. In the women's event, Elisa Longo Borghini has the most titles with six.

== Multiple winners ==
=== Men ===
Wins	Rider	Years
7	Filippo Ganna	2019, 2020, 2022, 2023, 2024, 2025, 2026
6	Marco Pinotti	2005, 2007, 2008, 2009, 2010, 2013
3	Marco Velo	1998, 1999, 2000
3	Adriano Malori	2011, 2014, 2015
2	Gianni Moscon	2017, 2018

=== Women ===
Wins	Rider	Years
8	Elisa Longo Borghini	2014, 2016, 2017, 2020, 2021, 2022, 2023, 2026
5	Tatiana Guderzo	2005, 2008, 2010, 2012, 2013
4	Maria Canins	1987, 1988, 1989, 1990
4	Imelda Chiappa	1993, 1994, 1995, 1998
4	Gabriella Pregnolato	1996, 1997, 1999, 2000
3	Giovanna Troldi	2002, 2003, 2004
2	Noemi Cantele	2009, 2011
2	Elena Cecchini	2018, 2019
2	Silvia Valsecchi	2006, 2015
2	Vittoria Guazzini	2024, 2025

== Men ==
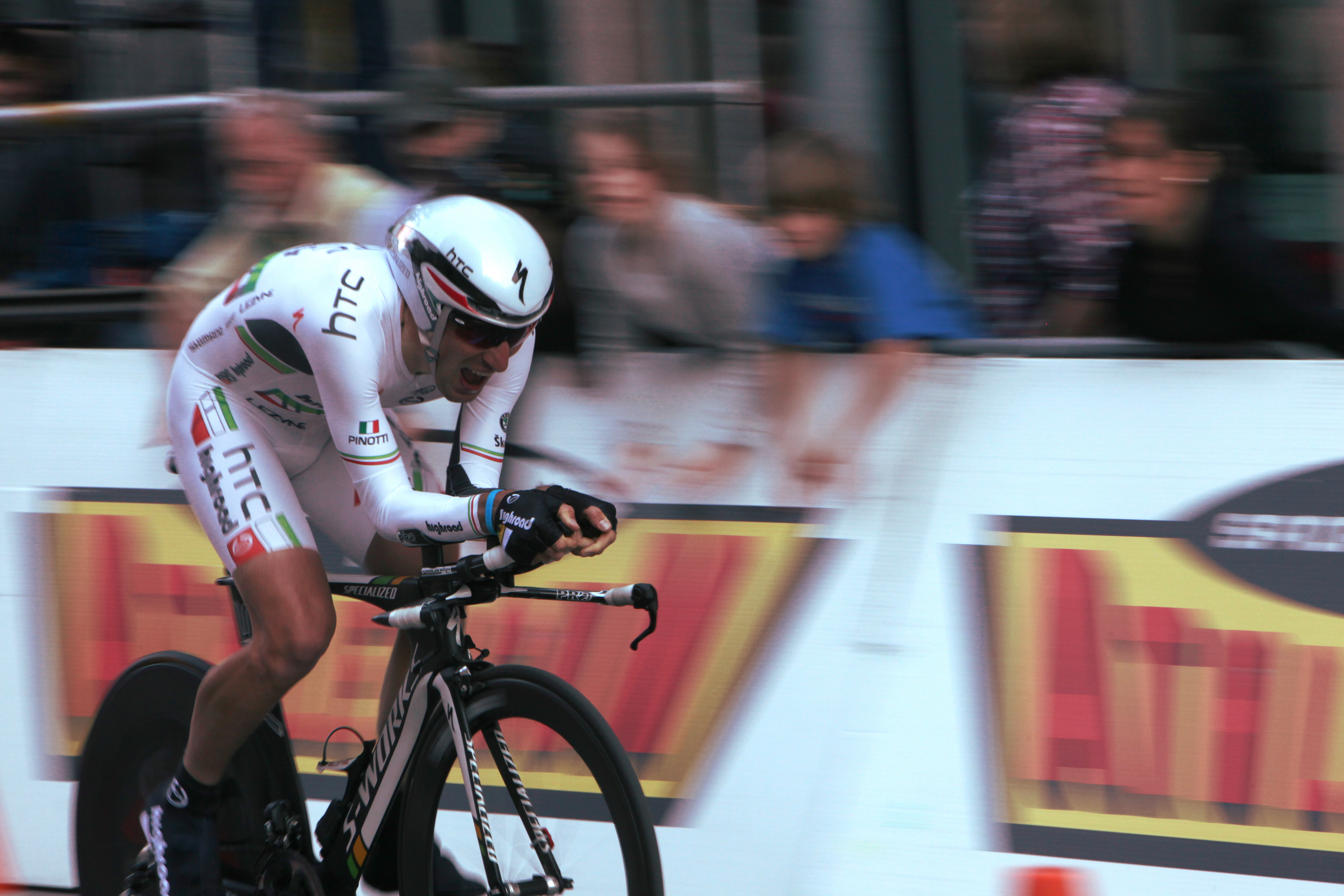
Marco Pinotti

=== Elite ===
Year	Gold	Silver	Bronze
1994	Andrea Chiurato	Rosario Fina	Rossano Brasi
1995	Massimiliano Lelli	Andrea Chiurato	Luca Scinto
1996	Marco Fincato	Fabio Roscioli	Massimo Podenzana
1997	Dario Andriotto	Carlo Finco	Cristian Salvato
1998	Marco Velo	Luca Sironi	Mirco Gualdi
1999	Marco Velo	Riccardo Forconi	Daniele Nardello
2000	Marco Velo	Daniele Contrini	Diego Ferrari
2001	Andrea Peron (Note: Original winner Marco Velo was disqualified due to a doping infraction.)	Daniele Contrini	Juri Alvisi
2002	Dario Frigo	Filippo Pozzato	Juri Alvisi
2003	Gianpaolo Mondini	Manuel Quinziato	Andrea Rossi
2004	Dario Cioni	Andrea Peron	Marco Pinotti
2005	Marco Pinotti	Marzio Bruseghin	Dario Cioni
2006	Marzio Bruseghin	Marco Pinotti	Manuel Quinziato
2007	Marco Pinotti (Note: Original winner Luca Ascani was disqualified due to a doping infraction for erythropoietin (EPO).)	Vincenzo Nibali	Manuel Quinziato
2008	Marco Pinotti	Luca Celli	Maurizio Biondo
2009	Marco Pinotti	Gabriele Bosisio	Maurizio Biondo
2010	Marco Pinotti	Dario Cataldo	Adriano Malori
2011	Adriano Malori	Manuele Boaro	Alan Marangoni
2012	Dario Cataldo	Adriano Malori	Marco Pinotti
2013	Marco Pinotti	Stefano Pirazzi	Adriano Malori
2014	Adriano Malori	Dario Cataldo	Alan Marangoni
2015	Adriano Malori	Moreno Moser	Daniele Bennati
2016	Manuel Quinziato	Manuele Boaro	Moreno Moser
2017	Gianni Moscon	Fabio Felline	Manuel Quinziato
2018	Gianni Moscon	Filippo Ganna	Fabio Felline
2019	Filippo Ganna	Alberto Bettiol	Alessandro De Marchi
2020	Filippo Ganna	Alessandro De Marchi	Edoardo Affini
2021	Matteo Sobrero	Edoardo Affini	Mattia Cattaneo
2022	Filippo Ganna	Mattia Cattaneo	Edoardo Affini
2023	Filippo Ganna	Mattia Cattaneo	Matteo Sobrero
2024	Filippo Ganna	Edoardo Affini	Filippo Baroncini
2025	Filippo Ganna	Filippo Baroncini	Mattia Cattaneo
2026	Filippo Ganna	Luka Giaimi	Mattia Cattaneo

=== U23 ===
Year	Gold	Silver	Bronze
2003	Gianluca Moi	Maurizio Biondo	Giairo Ermeti
2004	Francesco Rivera	Luca Ascani	Mariano De Fino
2005	Tiziano Dall'Antonia	Francesco Tomei	Eddy Rosolen
2006	Alan Marangoni	Francesco Tomei	Ermanno Capelli
2007	Adriano Malori	Manuele Boaro	Marco Coledan
2008	Adriano Malori	Manuele Boaro	Daniel Oss
2009	Alfredo Balloni	Adriano Malori	Alessandro Stocco
2010	Matteo Mammini	Gianluca Leonardi	Alessandro Stocco
2011	Matteo Mammini	Massimo Coledan	Mattia Cattaneo
2012	Massimo Coledan	Davide Martinelli	Mirko Trosino
2013	Davide Martinelli	Andrea Toniatti	Luca Sterbini
2014	Davide Martinelli	Seid Lizde	Davide Belletti
2015	Davide Martinelli	Giovanni Carboni	Edoardo Affini
2016	Filippo Ganna	Giovanni Carboni	Seid Lizde
2017	Paolo Baccio	Edoardo Affini	Giovanni Carboni
2018	Edoardo Affini	Matteo Sobrero	Paolo Baccio
2019	Matteo Sobrero	Giovanni Aleotti	Antonio Puppio
2020	Jonathan Milan	Andrea Piccolo	Antonio Tiberi
2021	Filippo Baroncini	Marco Frigo	Davide Piganzoli
2022	Davide Piganzoli	Matteo Montefiori	Bryan Olivo
2023	Bryan Olivo	Nicolas Milesi	Dario Igor Belletta
2024	Andrea Raccagni Noviero	Nicolas Milesi	Christian Bagatin
2025	Davide Donati	Nicolas Milesi	Luka Giaimi
2026	Nicolas Milesi	Davide Basso	Davide Frigo

== Women ==
Year	Gold	Silver	Bronze
1987	Maria Canins		
1988	Maria Canins		
1989	Maria Canins	Francesca Galli	Roberta Bonanomi
1990	Maria Canins	Monica Baldini	Francesca Galli
1991	Roberta Bonanomi	Maria Paola Turcutto	Imelda Chiappa
1992	Maria Paola Turcutto	Simona Muzzioli	Roberta Bonanomi
1993	Imelda Chiappa	Simona Muzzioli	Roberta Bonanomi
1994	Imelda Chiappa	Antonella Bellutti	Maria Canins
1995	Imelda Chiappa	Roberta Bonanomi	Maria Canins
1996	Gabriella Pregnolato	Imelda Chiappa	Antonella Bellutti
1997	Gabriella Pregnolato	Imelda Chiappa	Roberta Bonanomi
1998	Imelda Chiappa	Gabriella Pregnolato	Lucia Pizzolotto
1999	Gabriella Pregnolato	Giovanna Troldi	Linda Visentin
2000	Gabriella Pregnolato	Luisa Tamanini	Lucia Pizzolotto
2001	Alessandra Cappellotto	Vera Carrara	Luisa Tamanini
2002	Giovanna Troldi	Fabiana Luperini	Luisa Tamanini
2003	Giovanna Troldi	Luisa Tamanini	Tania Belvederesi
2004	Giovanna Troldi	Tatiana Guderzo	Anna Zugno
2005	Tatiana Guderzo	Anna Zugno	Silvia Valsecchi
2006	Silvia Valsecchi	Giovanna Troldi	Tatiana Guderzo
2007	Vera Carrara	Anna Zugno	Silvia Valsecchi
2008	Tatiana Guderzo	Anna Zugno	Silvia Valsecchi
2009	Noemi Cantele	Tatiana Guderzo	Silvia Valsecchi
2010	Tatiana Guderzo	Silvia Valsecchi	Noemi Cantele
2011	Noemi Cantele	Silvia Valsecchi	Tatiana Guderzo
2012	Tatiana Guderzo	Elisa Longo Borghini	Noemi Cantele
2013	Tatiana Guderzo	Elisa Longo Borghini	Silvia Valsecchi
2014	Elisa Longo Borghini	Elena Berlato	Vittoria Bussi
2015	Silvia Valsecchi	Tatiana Guderzo	Elena Berlato
2016	Elisa Longo Borghini	Tatiana Guderzo	Silvia Valsecchi
2017	Elisa Longo Borghini	Elena Cecchini	Silvia Valsecchi
2018	Elena Cecchini	Vittoria Bussi	Rossella Ratto
2019	Elena Cecchini	Vittoria Bussi	Elisa Longo Borghini
2020	Elisa Longo Borghini	Vittoria Bussi	Vittoria Guazzini
2021	Elisa Longo Borghini	Soraya Paladin	Tatiana Guderzo
2022	Elisa Longo Borghini	Vittoria Guazzini	Marta Cavalli
2023	Elisa Longo Borghini	Marta Cavalli	Alessia Vigilia
2024	Vittoria Guazzini	Elisa Longo Borghini	Elena Pirrone
2025	Vittoria Guazzini	Elisa Longo Borghini	Federica Venturelli
2026	Elisa Longo Borghini	Alessia Vigilia	Letizia Borghesi

== See also ==
- Italian National Road Race Championships
- National Road Cycling Championships
