= Memorial Davide Fardelli =

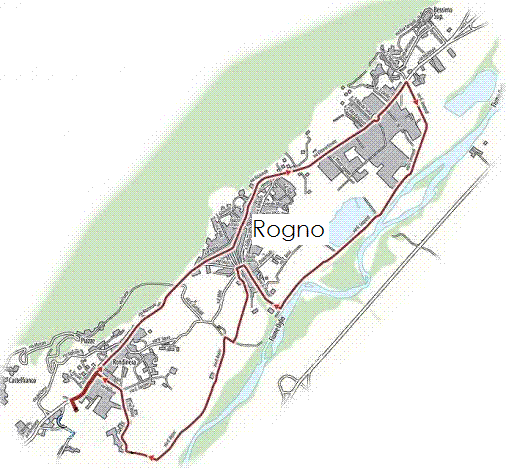

Race details
- Date: September
- Region: Italy
- Discipline: Road
- Type: Time Trial

History
- First edition: 2007
- Editions: 6
- Final edition: 2012
- First winner: Karin Thürig (SUI); Volodymyr Dyudya (UKR)
- Most wins: Karin Thürig (3 wins)
- Final winner: Edwige Pitel; Rohan Dennis (AUS)

Memorial Davide Fardelli — Cronometro Individuale was a women's senior and men's under-23 time trial cycle race which took place in Italy and was ranked by the UCI as 1.2.

== Previous winners ==
=== Men ===
Year	Winner	Second	Third
2005	(Ukraine) Volodymyr Dyudya	(Italy) Dario Benenati	(Italy) Andrea Giuponni
2006	(Italy) Alan Marangoni	(Italy) Luca Barla	(Italy) Francesco Tomei
2007	(Italy) Luca Dodi	(Italy) Enrico Peruffo	(Italy) Angelo Pagani
2008	(Germany) Marcel Kittel	(Italy) Alan Marangoni	(Italy) Adriano Malori
2009	(Italy) Manuele Boaro	(Italy) Mateo Mammini	(Italy) Alessandro Stocco
2010	(Australia) Luke Durbridge	(Kyrgyzstan) Eugen Wacker	(Germany) Marcel Kittel
2011	(Russia) Anton Vorobiov	(Italy) Gianluca Leonardi	(Australia) Luke Durbridge
2012	(Australia) Rohan Dennis	(Australia) Damien Howson	(Russia) Anton Vorobiov

=== Women ===
Year	Winner	Second	Third
2007	(Switzerland) Karin Thürig	(Australia) Sara Carrigan	(United States) Alison Powers
2008	(Switzerland) Karin Thürig	(Australia) Vicki Eustace Whitelaw	(Sweden) Susanne Ljungskog
2009	(Switzerland) Karin Thürig	(United States) Amber Neben	(Australia) Vicki Eustace Whitelaw
2010	(United States) Amber Neben	(Australia) Vicki Eustace Whitelaw	(Italy) Noemi Cantele
2011	(Germany) Judith Arndt	(United Kingdom) Emma Pooley	(United States) Amber Neben
2012	(France) Edwige Pitel	(Austria) Martina Ritter	(Switzerland) Pascale Schnider
