= 2016–17 Al-Hilal FC season =

Al-Hilal
2016–17 season
- President: Nawaf Bin Sa'ad
- Manager: Gustavo Matosas (until 22 September 2016); Marius Ciprian (caretaker) (from 22 September, until 25 October 2016); Ramón Díaz (from 25 October 2016)
- Stadium: King Fahd Stadium; Faisal bin Fahd Stadium
- SPL: 1st
- Super Cup: Runners-up
- Crown Prince Cup: Semi-finals
- King Cup: Quarter-finals
- AFC Champions League: Group stage
- Top goalscorer: League: Léo Bonatini (11); All: Léo Bonatini (14)
- Highest home attendance: 35,033 vs Al-Ittihad (28 October 2016)
- Lowest home attendance: 3,921 vs Al-Khaleej (16 February 2017)
- Average home league attendance: 15,387
Home colours	Away colours	Third colours
- All statistics correct as of 21 February 2017.

The 2016–17 season is the Al-Hilal Saudi Football Club's 60th in existence and 41st consecutive season in the top flight of Saudi Arabian football. Along with Pro League, the club also competes in the AFC Champions League, Super Cup, Crown Prince Cup and the King Cup.

== Players ==
=== Squad information ===
Players and squad numbers last updated on 31 January 2017.
Note: Flags indicate national team as has been defined under FIFA eligibility rules. Players may hold more than one non-FIFA nationality.

No.	Name	Nat.	Position(s)	Date of birth (age)	Signed in	Contract until	Signed from	Transfer Fee	Notes
Goalkeepers
1	Abdullah Al-Mayouf	(Saudi Arabia)	GK	23 January 1987 (age 39)	2016	2018	(Saudi Arabia) Al-Ahli	Free	
22	Fahad Al-Thunayan	(Saudi Arabia)	GK	29 August 1986 (age 40)	2014	2019	(Saudi Arabia) Al-Taawoun	€1.8M	
28	Marwan Al-Haidari	(Saudi Arabia)	GK	12 April 1996 (age 30)	2016	2020	(Saudi Arabia) Al-Nahda	€0.3M	
30	Mohammed Al-Waked	(Saudi Arabia)	GK	25 March 1992 (age 34)	2013	2017	Youth system	N/A	
Defenders
2	Mohammed Al-Breik	(Saudi Arabia)	RB / RW	15 September 1992 (age 34)	2014	2018	Youth system	N/A	
4	Abdullah Al-Zori	(Saudi Arabia)	CB / LB	13 August 1987 (age 39)	2007	2019	(Saudi Arabia) Al-Nahda	Undisclosed	
5	Ahmed Sharahili	(Saudi Arabia)	CB / RB	8 May 1994 (age 32)	2013	2018	Youth system	N/A	
12	Yasser Al-Shahrani	(Saudi Arabia)	LB / RB	22 May 1992 (age 34)	2012	2018	(Saudi Arabia) Al-Qadisiyah	€3.5M	
17	Abdullah Al-Hafith	(Saudi Arabia)	CB	25 December 1992 (age 33)	2013	2018	(Saudi Arabia) Al-Ettifaq	€0.4M	
33	Osama Hawsawi	(Saudi Arabia)	CB	31 March 1984 (age 42)	2016	2018	(Saudi Arabia) Al-Ahli	Free	
36	Muteb Al-Mufarrij	(Saudi Arabia)	Defender	19 August 1996 (age 30)	2016		Youth system	N/A	
70	Mohammed Jahfali	(Saudi Arabia)	CB	24 October 1990 (age 36)	2015	2020	(Saudi Arabia) Al-Faisaly	€1.8M	
Midfielders
3	Carlos Eduardo	(Brazil)	CM / AM	17 October 1989 (age 37)	2015	2018	(Portugal) FC Porto	€7M	
6	Abdulmalek Al-Khaibri	(Saudi Arabia)	DM / CM	13 March 1986 (age 40)	2016	2019	(Saudi Arabia) Al-Shabab	Free	
7	Salman Al-Faraj	(Saudi Arabia)	AM / LM / LW	1 August 1989 (age 37)	2008	2017	Youth system	N/A	Captain
8	Abdullah Otayf	(Saudi Arabia)	DM / CM	3 August 1992 (age 34)	2013	2018	(Saudi Arabia) Al-Shabab	€2.3M	
10	Mohammad Al-Shalhoub	(Saudi Arabia)	AM / LW	8 December 1980 (age 45)	1998	2017	Youth system	N/A	Vice-captain
11	Abdullaziz Al-Dawsari	(Saudi Arabia)	AM / LM	11 October 1988 (age 38)	2007	2019	Youth system	N/A	
16	Nicolás Milesi	(Uruguay)	DM / CM	10 November 1992 (age 34)	2016	2018	(Uruguay) Danubio	Undisclosed	
18	Abdulmajeed Al-Ruwaili	(Saudi Arabia)	CM / AM	28 August 1986 (age 40)	2016	2018	(Saudi Arabia) Al-Taawoun	€1.6M	
21	Majed Al-Najrani	(Saudi Arabia)	CM	25 January 1993 (age 33)	2016	2019	(Saudi Arabia) Al-Qadisiyah	€0.6M	
24	Nawaf Al-Abed	(Saudi Arabia)	LW / RW	26 January 1990 (age 36)	2008	2018	Youth system	N/A	
25	Faisel Darwish	(Saudi Arabia)	DM / CM / RM	3 July 1991 (age 35)	2015	2020	(Saudi Arabia) Al-Raed	€1.4M	
27	Tiago Alves	(Brazil)	LM / LW	12 January 1993 (age 33)	2016	2019	(Brazil) Penapolense	Undisclosed	
29	Salem Al-Dawsari	(Saudi Arabia)	RM / RW	19 August 1991 (age 35)	2011	2019	Youth system	N/A	
36	Mojahed Al-Munee	(Saudi Arabia)	AM / CM	15 January 1996 (age 30)	2016		Youth system	N/A	
Forwards
9	Léo Bonatini	(Brazil)	ST / CF	28 March 1994 (age 32)	2016	2019	(Portugal) Estoril	€5.5M	
20	Yasser Al-Qahtani	(Saudi Arabia)	ST / CF	11 October 1982 (age 44)	2005	2017	(Saudi Arabia) Al-Qadisiyah	€5.3M	
77	Omar Kharbin	(Syria)	ST / CF	15 January 1994 (age 32)	2017	2017	(United Arab Emirates) Al-Dhafra	Loan	

== Transfers ==
=== In ===
Date	Pos.	Player	Age	Moving from	Fee	Notes	Source
6 June 2016	MF	(Saudi Arabia) Abdulmalek Al-Khaibri	30	(Saudi Arabia) Al-Shabab	Free		
27 June 2016	MF	(Saudi Arabia) Majed Al-Najrani	23	(Saudi Arabia) Al-Qadisiyah	€0.6M		
28 June 2016	MF	(Saudi Arabia) Abdulmajeed Al-Ruwaili	29	(Saudi Arabia) Al-Taawoun	€1.6M		
30 June 2016	DF	(Saudi Arabia) Abdullah Al-Hafith	23	(Saudi Arabia) Hajer		Return from loan	
1 July 2016	DF	(Saudi Arabia) Osama Hawsawi	32	(Saudi Arabia) Al-Ahli	Free		
12 July 2016	GK	(Saudi Arabia) Abdullah Al-Mayouf	29	(Saudi Arabia) Al-Ahli	Free		
16 July 2016	FW	(Brazil) Léo Bonatini	22	(Portugal) Estoril	€5.5M		
2 August 2016	MF	(Brazil) Tiago Alves	23	(Brazil) Penapolense	Undisclosed		
13 August 2016	MF	(Uruguay) Nicolás Milesi	23	(Uruguay) Danubio	Undisclosed		

=== Out ===
Date	Pos.	Player	Age	Moving to	Fee	Notes	Source
21 June 2016	DF	(Saudi Arabia) Yahya Al-Musalem	29	(Saudi Arabia) Al-Wehda	Free		
29 June 2016	DF	(Saudi Arabia) Sultan Al-Bishi	26	(Saudi Arabia) Al-Faisaly	Free		
1 July 2016	DF	(South Korea) Kwak Tae-hwi	34	(South Korea) Seoul	Free		
31 July 2016	DF	(Brazil) Digão	28	(United Arab Emirates) Al-Sharjah	Undisclosed		
11 August 2016	MF	(Saudi Arabia) Hamed Al-Hamed	28	(Saudi Arabia) Al-Fateh	Free		
12 August 2016	DF	(Saudi Arabia) Sultan Al-Deayea	23	(Saudi Arabia) Al-Shabab	Free		
16 August 2016	FW	(Saudi Arabia) Younes Alaiwi	23	(Saudi Arabia) Al-Khaleej	Free		
20 August 2016	FW	(Brazil) Aílton Almeida	32	(United Arab Emirates) Al-Jazira	Free	Following Almeida's release, he signed for Al-Jazira.	
2 September 2016	MF	(Saudi Arabia) Abdulaziz Al-Sharid	22	(Saudi Arabia) Al-Taawoun	Free		
3 September 2016	FW	(Saudi Arabia) Yousef Al-Salem	31	(Saudi Arabia) Al-Ettifaq	Free		
22 September 2016	MF	(Saudi Arabia) Saud Kariri	36	(Saudi Arabia) Al-Shabab	Free		
30 January 2017	DF	(Saudi Arabia) Fahad Ghazi	22	(Saudi Arabia) Al-Shabab	Free		
30 January 2017	MF	(Saudi Arabia) Khalid Kaabi	24	(Saudi Arabia) Al-Shabab	Free		
30 January 2017	MF	(Saudi Arabia) Mohammed Al-Qarni	27	(Saudi Arabia) Al-Shabab	Free		

=== Loan in ===
Date	Pos.	Player	Age	Loaned from	Notes	Loan Expiry	Source
17 January 2017	FW	(Syria) Omar Kharbin	24	(United Arab Emirates) Al-Dhafra		30 June 2017	

=== Loan out ===
Date	Pos.	Player	Age	Loaned to	Notes	Loan Expiry	Source
21 June 2016	GK	(Saudi Arabia) Abdullah Al-Sudairy	24	(Saudi Arabia) Al-Wehda		30 June 2017	
21 June 2016	DF	(Saudi Arabia) Abdullah Al-Shamekh	23	(Saudi Arabia) Al-Wehda		30 June 2017	
5 July 2016	MF	(Saudi Arabia) Abdulkareem Al-Qahtani	23	(Saudi Arabia) Al-Raed		30 June 2017	
16 August 2016	DF	(Saudi Arabia) Abdullah Al-Ammar	22	(Saudi Arabia) Al-Fateh		30 June 2017	
8 January 2017	MF	(Saudi Arabia) Abdulmajeed Al-Sawat	21	(Saudi Arabia) Al-Taawoun		30 June 2017	
13 January 2017	GK	(Saudi Arabia) Khalid Sharahili	29	(Saudi Arabia) Al-Raed		30 June 2017	
18 January 2017	FW	(Saudi Arabia) Nasser Al-Shamrani	33	(United Arab Emirates) Al-Ain		30 June 2017	

== Pre-season and friendlies ==
18 July 2016	Al-Hilal (Saudi Arabia)	4–0	(Austria) Bischofshofen	Bischofshofen, Austria
17:30 UTC+2	Eduardo 13'; Jahfali 35'; Al-Sharid 50'; Al-Salem 80'			Stadium: Bischofshofen Stadium

22 July 2016	Beşiktaş (Turkey)	1–1	(Saudi Arabia) Al-Hilal	Saalfelden, Austria
18:00 UTC+2	Tosun 3'		Al-Qahtani 60'	Stadium: sportplatz bürgerau

25 July 2016	Lekhwiya (Qatar)	1–2	(Saudi Arabia) Al-Hilal	Saalfelden, Austria
18:00 UTC+2	Jahfali 22' (o.g.)		Eduardo 51'; Musa 54' (o.g.)	Stadium: Sportplatz St. Ulrich

2 August 2016	Al-Hilal (Saudi Arabia)	0–1	(Italy) Udinese	Gmünd, Austria
18:00 UTC+2			Théréau 31'	Stadium: Sportplatz Askö Gmünd

2 September 2016	Al-Hilal (Saudi Arabia)	2–0	(Saudi Arabia) Al-Shoulla	Riyadh
18:50 UTC+3	Al-Shamrani 16'; Al-Sawat 42'			Stadium: Club Stadium

7 September 2016	El Jaish (Qatar)	3–3	(Saudi Arabia) Al-Hilal	Doha, Qatar
18:30 UTC+3	Romarinho 16', 43', 73'		Al-Shamrani 20'; Kariri 84'; Al-Qahtani 90+3'	Stadium: Abdullah bin Khalifa Stadium

8 October 2016	Al-Hilal (Saudi Arabia)	3–2	(Saudi Arabia) Al-Taawoun	Riyadh
18:30 UTC+3	Al-Shahrani 25'; A. Al-Dawsari 28'; Tiago Alves 49'		Al-Shameri 55'; Al-Zein 82' (pen.)	Stadium: Club Stadium

== Competitions ==
=== Overall ===
Competition	Started round	Current position / round	Final position / round	First match	Last match
Saudi Super Cup	Final		runners-up	8 August 2016	
Professional League	Round 1	—	—	13 August 2016	—
Crown Prince Cup	Round of 16	Semi-finals	—	26 September 2016	—
2017 Champions League	Group stage	Group stage	—	20/21 February 2017	—
King Cup	Round of 32	Round of 32	—	—	—

Last Updated: 25 October 2016

=== Saudi Super Cup ===
8 August 2016	Al-Ahli	1–1 (4–3 p)	Al-Hilal	London, England
19:30 UTC+1	Al-Somah 69'	Report	Al-Breik (yellow card) 48', (goal) 61'	Stadium: Craven Cottage; Attendance: 16,365; Referee: Sébastien Delferière (Belgium)
	Penalties
	Carlos (penalty missed); Hawsawi (penalty scored); Bassas (penalty scored); Al-Mogahwi (penalty scored); Al-Somah (penalty scored)		(penalty scored) Al-Qahtani; (penalty scored) Al-Shamrani; (penalty missed) Hawsawi; (penalty missed) Al-Ruwaili; (penalty scored) S. Al-Dawsari

=== Pro League ===
==== League table ====
Pos	Team	Pld	W	D	L	GF	GA	GD	Pts	Qualification or relegation
1	Al-Hilal (C)	26	21	3	2	63	16	+47	66	Qualification to AFC Champions League group stage
2	Al-Ahli	26	17	4	5	57	30	+27	55	Qualification to AFC Champions League group stage
3	Al-Nassr	26	16	4	6	44	25	+19	52 (Note: Al-Nassr finished ahead of Al-Ittihad on head-to-head points: Al-Ittihad 0–1 Al-Nassr, Al-Nassr 1–1 Al-Ittihad)	
4	Al-Ittihad (Note: Al-Ittihad were docked 3 points for failing to pay over debts.)	26	17	4	5	57	37	+20	52	
5	Al-Raed	26	11	2	13	37	47	−10	35	

Updated to match(es) played on 4 May 2017. Source: slstat.com
Rules for classification: 1) Points; 2) Head-to-head points; 3) Head-to-head goal difference; 4) Total goal difference; 5) Total goals scored; 6) Play-off (only for deciding champion, relegation and AFC competitions participation).
(C) Champions

==== Results summary ====
Overall								Home						Away					
Pld	W	D	L	GF	GA	GD	Pts	W	D	L	GF	GA	GD	W	D	L	GF	GA	GD
26	21	3	2	63	16	+47	66	9	2	2	33	9	+24	12	1	0	30	7	+23

Last updated: 4 May 2017.
Source: Competitive matches

==== Results by round ====
Round	1	2	3	4	5	6	7	8	9	10	11	12	13	14	15	16	17	18	19	20	21	22	23	24	25	26
Ground	H	A	H	A	H	A	H	A	H	A	H	H	A	A	H	A	H	A	H	A	H	A	H	A	A	H
Result	W	W	L	W	W	W	L	W	W	W	W	W	D	W	W	W	D	W	W	W	W	W	D	W	W	W
Position	4	2	4	3	2	1	2	2	1	1	1	1	1	1	1	1	1	1	1	1	1	1	1	1	1	1

Updated to match(es) played on 4 May 2017. Source: Competitive matches
A = Away; H = Home; W = Win; D = Draw; L = Loss

==== Matches ====
All times are local, AST (UTC+3).

Win Draw Loss Postponed

13 August 2016 1	Al-Hilal	2–0	Al-Batin	Riyadh
20:45	Al-Breik (yellow card) 7'; Al-Shamrani 74'; Al-Qahtani 87'	Report		Stadium: King Fahd International Stadium; Attendance: 15,371; Referee: Saleh Al-Hathloul

19 August 2016 2	Al-Taawoun	0–2	Al-Hilal	Buraidah
21:05	Amro (yellow card) 27'; Kanno (yellow card) 42'; Absi (yellow card) 76'	Report	Jahfali (yellow card) 37'; Ghazi (yellow card) 39'; Al-Abed 43'; S. Al-Dawsari (yellow card) 45+3'; Al-Shalhoub 48' (pen.); Al-Khaibri (yellow card) 71'	Stadium: King Abdullah Sport City Stadium; Attendance: 11,966; Referee: Shukri Al-Hanfosh

16 September 2016 3	Al-Hilal	1–2	Al-Ettifaq	Riyadh
20:45	Jahfali (yellow card) 36'; Al-Abed 57'; Al-Shamrani (yellow card) 79'	Report	Al-Hazaa 80'; Al-Zaqaan 81'	Stadium: King Fahd International Stadium; Attendance: 7,484; Referee: Szymon Marciniak (Poland)

22 September 2016 4	Al-Qadisiyah	1–2	Al-Hilal	Dammam
20:25	Eze 30'; Al-Khabrani (yellow card) 52' (yellow-red card) 58'	Report	Al-Ruwaili 3'; Al-Abed 61'	Stadium: Prince Mohamed bin Fahd Stadium; Attendance: 5,820; Referee: Simon Lee Evans (Wales)

15 October 2016 5	Al-Hilal	4–0	Al-Faisaly	Riyadh
20:00	Al-Shamrani 2', 68'; Eduardo 9', 64'	Report	N. Al-Muwallad (yellow card) 45+2'; Cabrera (yellow card) 51'	Stadium: King Fahd International Stadium; Attendance: 8,318; Referee: Mohammed Al-Hoaish

20 October 2016 6	Al-Khaleej	1–6	Al-Hilal	Dammam
20:00	López (yellow card) 59'; Al-Sheikh (yellow card) 85'; Jandson 89'	Report	Al Freej 4' (o.g.); Jahfali (yellow card) 60'; Al-Shamrani 61' (pen.), 64'; Eduardo 73', 84'; Bonatini 87'	Stadium: Prince Mohamed bin Fahd Stadium; Attendance: 5,242; Referee: Sultan Al-Harbi

28 October 2016 7	Al-Hilal	0–2	Al-Ittihad	Riyadh
20:00	Al-Shalhoub (yellow card) 90'	Report	Al-Nakhli (yellow card) 50'; Assiri 56'; Al-Aryani 78', (yellow card) 86'	Stadium: King Fahd International Stadium; Attendance: 35,033; Referee: Cüneyt Çakır (Turkey)

5 November 2016 8	Al-Fateh	0–1	Al-Hilal	Al-Hasa
20:00	Al-Mousa (yellow card) 20'; Buhimed (yellow card) 50'; Abo Shaqraa (yellow card) 87'	Report	Eduardo (yellow card) 34'; Bonatini 89'	Stadium: Prince Abdullah bin Jalawi Stadium; Attendance: 8,071; Referee: Turki Al-Khudhayr

20 November 2016 9	Al-Hilal	2–1	Al-Raed	Riyadh
19:45	Al-Shahrani 66'; Bonatini 86'	Report	Al-Mowalad (yellow card) 57'; Bangoura 68'; Ayman Ftayni (yellow card) 86'	Stadium: Prince Faisal bin Fahd Stadium; Attendance: 5,132; Referee: Khaled Al-Teris

25 November 2016 10	Al-Ahli	1–2	Al-Hilal	Jeddah
20:00	Al-Mogahwi (yellow card) 80'; Al Somah (yellow card) 80' (goal) 90+3'; Al-Moasher (yellow card) 90'	Report	Bonatini 27'; Carlos Eduardo 59'	Stadium: King Abdullah Sports City; Attendance: 51,659; Referee: David Fernández Borbalán (Spain)

2 December 2016 11	Al-Hilal	3–0	Al-Shabab	Riyadh
19:55	Al-Abed 42'; Bonatini 49'; Tiago 78'	Report	A-Fahad (yellow card) 29'; Otaif (yellow card) 37'	Stadium: King Fahd International Stadium; Attendance: 16,075; Referee: Mohammed Al-Hoaish

8 December 2016 12	Al-Hilal	6–0	Al-Wehda	Riyadh
19:55	Bonatini 9'; Carlos Eduardo 34'; Al-Abed 56'; Al-Qahtani 70'; Al-Shamrani 82' 90+2'	Report	Al-Najar (yellow card) 86'; Hatem Belal (yellow card) 89'	Stadium: Prince Faisal bin Fahd Stadium; Attendance: 8,458; Referee: Sultan Al-Harbi

16 December 2016 13	Al-Nassr	1–1	Al-Hilal	Riyadh
20:00	Tomasov 33'; Sharahili (yellow card) 39'; Tomečak (yellow card) 45+1'; Ayala (yellow card) 76'	Report	Al-Breik 16'; Al-Abed (yellow card) 30'; Al-Hafith (yellow card) 40'; Al-Khaibri (yellow card) 81'	Stadium: King Fahd International Stadium; Attendance: 27,181; Referee: Milorad Mažić (Serbia)

21 December 2016 14	Al-Batin	0–2	Al-Hilal	Hafar al-Batin
19:45	Alves (yellow card) 45+1'; Ayyadah (yellow card) 86'	Report	Carlos Eduardo (yellow card) 19' (red card) 19'; Tiago (yellow card) 42'; Bonatini 45+3'; Al-Breik (yellow card) 52'; Al-Dawsari 73'; Al-Hafith (yellow card) 83'	Stadium: Al-Batin Club Stadium; Attendance: 4,583; Referee: Mohammed Al-Qarni

31 December 2016 15	Al-Hilal	4–2	Al-Taawoun	Riyadh
19:50	Machado 4' (o.g.); Bonatini 11' 22'; Al-Qahtani 69' (pen.)	Report	Al-Breik 45' (o.g.); Muaaz (yellow card) 58'; Al-Mousa (yellow card) 68'; Machado 87'	Stadium: Prince Faisal bin Fahd Stadium; Attendance: 6,386; Referee: Khaled Al-Teris

28 January 2016 16	Al-Ettifaq	0–1	Al-Hilal	Dammam
20:15	Al-Kwikbi (yellow card) 57'; Otain (yellow card) 69'	Report	Milesi 32'	Stadium: Prince Mohamed bin Fahd Stadium; Attendance: 14,640; Referee: Felix Brych (Germany)

2 February 2017 17	Al-Hilal	1–1	Al-Qadisiyah	Riyadh
20:20	Kharbin 55'	Report	Eze 8'; Krenshi (yellow card) 45' (yellow-red card); Masrahi (yellow card) 59'; Jaafari (yellow card) 72'; Fallatah (yellow card) 88'	Stadium: Prince Faisal bin Fahd Stadium; Attendance: 7,336; Referee: Istvan Kovacs (Romania)

9 February 2017 18	Al-Faisaly	0–2	Al-Hilal	Al Majma'ah
19:45	Salem (yellow card) 68'	Report	Hawsawi (yellow card) 19'; Al-Faraj 51'; Kharbin 78'	Stadium: King Salman Sport City Stadium; Attendance: 2,506; Referee: Tim Marshall (Northern Ireland)

16 February 2017 19	Al-Hilal	4–0	Al-Khaleej	Riyadh
20:00	Bonatini 28' (pen.), 74'; Al-Faraj 53'; Carlos Eduardo 60'	Report		Stadium: Prince Faisal bin Fahd Stadium; Attendance: 3,921; Referee: Andreas Ekberg (Sweden)

5 March 2017 20	Al-Ittihad	1–3	Al-Hilal	Jeddah
20:30	Al-Ansari (yellow card) 22'; Akaïchi 38', (yellow card) 61'; Fallatah (yellow card) 61'; Al-Muziel (yellow card) 72'; Kahraba (yellow card) 90'; Al-Muwallad (red card) 90'	Report	Hawsawi (yellow card) 23'; Carlos Eduardo 56'; Al-Breik (yellow card) 61'; Kharbin (yellow card) 61', (goal) 83'; Al-Abed (yellow card) 90+2' (goal) 90+5' (pen.)	Stadium: King Abdullah Sports City; Attendance: 53,656; Referee: Jonas Eriksson (referee) (Sweden)

9 March 2017 21	Al-Hilal	1–0	Al-Fateh	Riyadh
20:35	Al-Hafith (yellow card) 66'; Kharbin (yellow card) 81'; Al-Qahtani 90+7'	Report	Al-Zaqaan (yellow card) 36'; Oueslati (yellow card) 58'; Al-Ammar (yellow card) 61'; Al-Mazyadei (yellow card) 90+7'	Stadium: Prince Faisal bin Fahd Stadium; Attendance: 15,001; Referee: István Vad (Hungary)

6 April 2017 22	Al-Raed	0–3	Al-Hilal	Buraidah
21:40	Amora (yellow card) 11'; Al-Showaish (yellow card) 79'	Report	Carlos Eduardo 49'; Al-Dossari 51'; Bonatini 81'	Stadium: King Abdullah Sport City Stadium; Attendance: 15,192; Referee: Ivan Bebek (Croatia)

15 April 2017 23	Al-Hilal	0-0	Al-Ahli	Riyadh
20:45	Mohammed Al-Breik (yellow card) 19'	Report	Abdulfattah Asiri (yellow card) 16'	Stadium: King Fahd International Stadium; Attendance: 12,348; Referee: (Turkey) Cüneyt Çakır

20 April 2017 24	Al-Shabab	1-2	Al-Hilal	Riyadh
20:45	Abdulmajeed Al-Sulayhem 31' (yellow card) 61'; Saif Al Hashan (yellow card) 90+3'	Report	Omar Kharbin 13' (pen.); Carlos Eduardo 35'; Nawaf Al Abed (yellow card) 68'	Stadium: King Fahd International Stadium; Attendance: 12,815; Referee: (England) Mark Clattenburg

29 April 2017 25	Al-Wehda	1-3	Al-Hilal	Mecca
20:50	Sultan Al-Dossari (yellow card) 55'; Jebrin (yellow card) 73'; Sherif Hazem (yellow card) 74'; Mukhtar Fallatah 87'; Lima (yellow card) 90+2'; Farid Al-Harbi (yellow card) 90+4'	Report	Majed Al-Najrani (yellow card) 39' (goal) 51'; Carlos Eduardo 73'; Mohammad Al-Shalhoub 90+4'	Stadium: King Abdul Aziz Stadium; Attendance: 5,006; Referee: (Saudi Arabia) Mohammed Al Hoaish

4 May 2017 26	Al-Hilal	5-1	Al-Nassr	Riyadh
20:50	Nawaf Al Abed 28'; Omar Kharbin (yellow card) 34' (goal) 45' 67' 71'; Carlos Eduardo 45+1'	Report	Tomasov 42'; Shaye Ali Sharahili (yellow card) 43'	Stadium: King Fahd International Stadium; Attendance: 59,174; Referee: (Serbia) Milorad Mažić

=== Crown Prince Cup ===
Al-Hilal started the tournament directly to the round of 16, as one of last year's finalists. All times are local, AST (UTC+3).

26 September 2016 Round of 16	Al-Raed	1–2	Al-Hilal	Buraidah
18:35	Al-Bishi (yellow card) 57'; Gilmar 83'		Al-Abed 36', 41', (yellow card) 70'	Stadium: King Abdullah Sport City Stadium; Referee: Abdulrahman Al-Sultan

24 October 2016 Quarter-finals	Al-Hilal	2–0	Al-Shabab	Riyadh
20:00	Al-Breik 11'; Bonatini 16'; Al-Khaibri (yellow card) 65'	Report		Stadium: King Fahd International Stadium; Referee: Fahad Al-Mirdasi

26 December 2016 Semi-finals	Al-Hilal	0–2	Al-Nassr	Riyadh
19:50	Al-Faraj (yellow card) 32' (yellow-red card) 90+4'; Milesi (yellow card) 33'; Al-Hafith (yellow card) 80'	Summary	Al-Ghamdi (yellow card) 9'; Al-Fraidi (yellow card) 19'; Al-Sahlawi 26' (pen.); Tomasov 40'; Sharahili (yellow card) 90'	Stadium: King Fahd International Stadium; Referee: (Saudi Arabia) Turki Al Khudair

=== King Cup ===
18 January 2017 Round of 32	Al-Hilal	2–1	Al-Qaisumah	Riyadh
18:10	Al-Dawsari 66'; Sharahili (yellow card) 74'; Al-Qahtani 78'	Summary	Diop 45+1'	Stadium: King Fahd International Stadium; Referee: Abdullah Al-Nahet

23 January 2017 Round of 16	Al-Hilal	3–2	Al-Wehda	Riyadh
18:15	Bonatini 16', 51'; Milesi (yellow card) 29'; Al-Qahtani 41' (pen.); Al Abed (yellow card) 90+4'	Summary	Amer Haroon (yellow card) 33'; Al Baour (yellow card) 40'; Fallatah 65'; Al-Fahmi (yellow card) 75'; Al-Najar (yellow card) 77'; Al-Arraf (yellow card) 86'; Al-Faresi 87'	Stadium: Prince Faisal bin Fahd Stadium; Referee: Shukri Al-Hanfosh

1 April 2017 Quarter-finals	Al-Nassr	0-2	Al-Hilal	Riyadh
21:15	Ibrahim Ghaleb (yellow card) 53'	Report	Mohammed Jahfali (yellow card) 24'; Milesi 81' (yellow card) 82'; Omar Kharbin 90+1'	Stadium: King Fahd International Stadium; Referee: (Slovenia) Damir Skomina

13 May 2017 Semi-finals	Al-Hilal	4-3	Al-Taawoun	Riyadh
21:20	17 Omar Kharbin '46 Omar Kharbin '63 Salem Aldossari '81 Omar Kharbin	Report	4 Alassane N'Diaye '76 Madallah Alolayan '94 Alassane N'Diaye	Stadium: Prince Faisal bin Fahd Stadium; Attendance: 17000; Referee: Ivan BebekCroatia

18 May 2017 Final	Al-Ahli	2-3	Al-Hilal	Jeddah
21:00	'43 Motaz Hawsawi '93 Omar Al-Somah penalty		'28 Omar Kharbin '77 Mohammed Jahfali '90 Carlos Eduardo	Stadium: King Abdullah Sports City; Attendance: 62241; Referee: Artur Soares DiasCroatia

=== AFC Champions League ===
==== Group stage ====
Pos	Team	Pld	W	D	L	GF	GA	GD	Pts	Qualification	HIL	PER	RAY	WAH
1	(Saudi Arabia) Al-Hilal	6	3	3	0	10	7	+3	12	Advance to knockout stage	—	0–0	2–1	1–0
2	(Iran) Persepolis	6	2	3	1	9	8	+1	9	Advance to knockout stage	1–1	—	0–0	4–2
3	(Qatar) Al-Rayyan	6	2	1	3	10	13	−3	7		3–4	3–1	—	2–1
4	(United Arab Emirates) Al-Wahda	6	1	1	4	12	13	−1	4		2–2	2–3	5–1	—

Source: AFC
Rules for classification: Group stage tiebreakers

21 February 2017 1	Persepolis (Iran)	1–1	(Saudi Arabia) Al-Hilal	Muscat
19:00 UTC+4	Kamyabinia (yellow card) 24'; Mosalman 68'	Report	Carlos Eduardo 82'	Stadium: Sultan Qaboos Sports Complex; Attendance: 13,715; Referee: Hettikamkanamge Perera (Sri Lanka)

28 February 2017 2	Al-Hilal (Saudi Arabia)	2–1	(Qatar) Al-Rayyan SC	Riyadh
19:45 UTC+3	Carlos Eduardo 3'; Al-Breik (yellow card) 32'; Otayf (yellow card) 48'; Al-Shalhoub 90+6' (pen.)	Report	Tabata (yellow card) 25', (goal) 79'; Viera (yellow card) 36'; García (yellow card) 67'; Nathan (yellow card) 73'; Kheder (yellow card) 90+5'; Cáceres (yellow card) 90+6'	Stadium: Prince Faisal bin Fahd Stadium; Attendance: 12,208; Referee: Chris Beath (Australia)

14 March 2017 3	Al-Wahda (United Arab Emirates)	2–2	(Saudi Arabia) Al-Hial	Abu Dhabi
19:15 UTC+4	Rashed (yellow card) 10'; Tagliabué 45+1'; Dzsudzsák 55'; Sultan (yellow card) 80'; Rim (yellow card) 84'; Al-Ghaferi (yellow card) 90+4'	Report	Al-Abed 5', (yellow card) 39' (yellow-red card); Milesi (yellow card) 53'; Kharbin 69'; Al-Faraj (yellow card) 83'	Stadium: Al Nahyan Stadium; Attendance: 5,853; Referee: Ryuji Sato (Japan)

10 April 2017 4	Al-Hilal (Saudi Arabia)	1–0	(United Arab Emirates) Al-Wahda	Riyadh
20:00 UTC+3	Carlos Eduardo 24' (pen.)	Report	Abdulbasit (yellow card) 33'	Stadium: Prince Faisal bin Fahd Stadium; Attendance: 6,721; Referee: Kim Jong-hyeok (South Korea)

24 April 2017 5	Al-Hilal (Saudi Arabia)	0-0	(Iran) Persepolis	Muscat
19:00 UTC+4	Mohammed Jahfali (yellow card) 5'; Mohammed Al-Breik (yellow card) 27'; Abdulmalek Al-Khaibri (yellow card) 50'	Report		Stadium: Sultan Qaboos Sports Complex; Attendance: 10,177; Referee: (Iraq) Mohanad Qasim Eesee Sarray

8 May 2017 6	Al-Rayyan (Qatar)	3-4	(Saudi Arabia) Al-Hilal	Doha
18:25 UTC+3	Koh Myong-jin (yellow card) 6'; Sebastián Soria 55' (yellow card) 87'; Rodrigo Tabata 59' (yellow card) 85'; Sergio García 82'; Cáceres (yellow card) 90+5'	Report	Mohammed Jahfali (yellow card) 19'; Milesi 40' 73'; Abdullah Otayf (yellow card) 62'; Omar Kharbin 66' 84'; Abdullah Al-Hafith (yellow card) 85'; Nawaf Al Abed (yellow card) 85'	Stadium: Jassim Bin Hamad Stadium; Attendance: 4,934; Referee: (Uzbekistan) Ravshan Irmatov

=== Knockout stage ===
23 May 2017 Round of 16 First Leg	Esteghlal Khuzestan (Iran)	1 – 2	(Saudi Arabia) Al-Hilal	Seeb
19:30	Abdullah Al-Hafith 42' (o.g.); Alaei (yellow card) 87'; Salarvand (yellow card) 90+4'	Report	Abdulmalek Al-Khaibri (yellow card) 28'; Abdullah Al-Zori 52'; Carlos Eduardo 57'; Abdullah Al-Hafith (yellow card) 69'; Salem Al-Dawsari (yellow card) 90+3'; Abdulmajeed Al-Ruwaili (yellow card) 90+4'	Stadium: Al-Seeb Stadium; Attendance: 2,670; Referee: (Bahrain) Ali Abdulnabi

30 May 2017 Round of 16 Second Leg	(Saudi Arabia) Al-Hilal	2 – 1 (4 – 2 agg.)	Esteghlal Khuzestan (Iran)	Al Rayyan
20:30	Mohammed Jahfali (yellow card) 6'; Omar Kharbin 16'; Abdullah Otayf (yellow card) 55'; Salman Al-Faraj (yellow card) 58'; Salem Al-Dawsari 82'	Report	Nong 12'; Salarvand (yellow card) 72'	Stadium: Thani bin Jassim Stadium; Attendance: 1,620; Referee: (Japan) Jumpei Iida

== Statistics ==
=== Goalscorers ===
Rank	No.	Pos	Nat	Name	League	King Cup	Crown Prince Cup	Super Cup	ACL	Total
1	3	MF	(Brazil)	Carlos Eduardo	12	1	0	0	4	17
2	77	FW	(Syria)	Omar Kharbin	7	5	0	0	4	16
3	9	FW	(Brazil)	Léo Bonatini	12	2	1	0	0	15
4	24	MF	(Saudi Arabia)	Nawaf Al Abed	7	0	2	0	1	10
5	15	FW	(Saudi Arabia)	Nasser Al-Shamrani	7	0	0	0	0	7
6	20	FW	(Saudi Arabia)	Yasser Al-Qahtani	4	2	0	0	0	6
7	29	MF	(Saudi Arabia)	Salem Al-Dawsari	2	2	0	0	1	5
8	16	MF	(Uruguay)	Nicolás Milesi	1	1	0	0	2	4
9	2	DF	(Saudi Arabia)	Mohammed Al-Breik	1	0	1	1	0	3
9	10	MF	(Saudi Arabia)	Mohammad Al-Shalhoub	2	0	0	0	1	3
11	7	MF	(Saudi Arabia)	Salman Al-Faraj	2	0	0	0	0	2
12	3	DF	(Saudi Arabia)	Abdullah Al-Zori	0	0	0	0	1	1
12	12	DF	(Saudi Arabia)	Yasser Al-Shahrani	1	0	0	0	0	1
12	18	MF	(Saudi Arabia)	Abdulmajeed Al-Ruwaili	1	0	0	0	0	1
12	21	MF	(Saudi Arabia)	Majed Al-Najrani	1	0	0	0	0	1
12	27	MF	(Brazil)	Tiago Alves	1	0	0	0	0	1
12	70	DF	(Saudi Arabia)	Mohammed Jahfali	0	1	0	0	0	1
Own goal					2	0	0	0	0	2
Total					63	14	4	1	14	96

Last Updated: 10 June 2017

=== Clean sheets ===
Rank	No.	Pos	Nat	Name	League	King Cup	Crown Prince Cup	Super Cup	ACL	Total
1	1	GK	(Saudi Arabia)	Abdullah Al-Mayouf	12	1	1	0	1	14
Total					12	1	1	0	1	15

Last Updated: 10 April 2017
