= Manuele Boaro =

Italian road racing cyclist

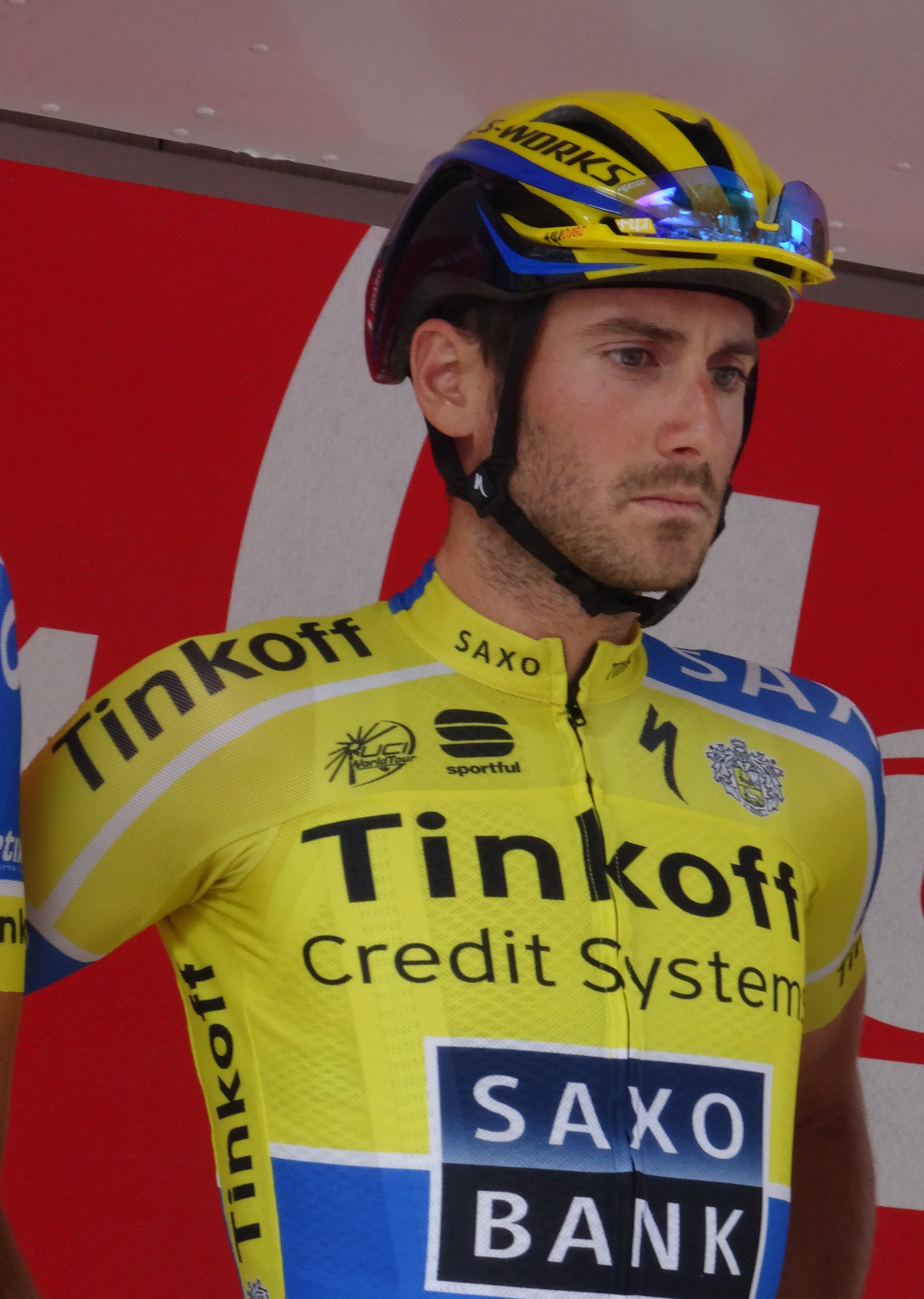
- Boaro in 2014.

Personal information
- Full name: Manuele Boaro
- Born: 12 March 1987 (age 39) Bassano del Grappa, Italy
- Height: 1.73 m (5 ft 8 in)
- Weight: 64 kg (141 lb; 10.1 st)

Cycling career
- Sport: Cycling
- Current team: XDS Astana Team
- Discipline: Road
- Role: Rider
- Rider type: Time trial specialist

Professional teams
- 2007–2009: Zalf–Désirée–Fior
- 2010: U.C. Trevigiani–Dynamon–Bottoli
- 2010: → Carmiooro NGC (stagiaire)
- 2011–2016: Saxo Bank–SunGard
- 2017–2018: Bahrain–Merida
- 2019–2023: Astana

Major wins
- Grand Tours Vuelta a España 1 TTT stage (2019)

Manuele Boaro (born 12 March 1987) is an Italian professional road bicycle racer, who currently rides for UCI WorldTeam XDS Astana Team.

Born in Bassano del Grappa, Boaro competed for U.C. Giorgione Aliseo as a junior, and Zalf–Désirée–Fior and U.C. Trevigiani–Dynamon–Bottoli as an amateur. Boaro joined professional team Carmiooro NGC in the second half of 2010 as a stagiaire. After completing his stagiaire stint, Boaro joined Saxo Bank–SunGard for the 2011 season, on a one-year contract. His contract was extended by two more years in late 2011. He was named in the startlist for the 2016 Vuelta a España. After the Tinkoff team disbanded, Boaro joined Bahrain–Merida. In August 2018 it was announced that Boaro would join Astana from 2019 on a two-year contract, with a role as a domestique. Since 2024 he is a sport director of JCL Team Ukyo.

== Major results ==
2004
3rd Time trial, National Junior Road Championships
2005
1st Time trial, National Junior Road Championships
1st Stage 3b Tre Ciclistica Bresciana Junior
2nd GP dell'Arno Junior
3rd Time trial, UEC European Junior Road Championships
2007
1st Gran Premio della Liberazione
1st Stage 1 Grand Prix Guillaume Tell
1st Stage 3 Under-23 Giro di Toscana
1st Stage 1 (TTT) Giro del Veneto
3rd Time trial, National Under-23 Road Championships
3rd Citadella
2008
1st Trofeo Zsšdi
2nd Time trial, National Under-23 Road Championships
7th Overall Tour de San Luis
8th Under-23 Giro del Canavese
2009
1st Memorial Davide Fardelli
2nd Trofeo Alcide Degasperi
2010
1st Trofeo Città di Brescia
2nd Coppa della Pace
2nd Cronoscalata Gardone
4th Freccia dei Vini
7th Trofeo Edil C
2011
2nd Time trial, National Road Championships
2012
2nd Overall Circuit de la Sarthe
3rd Overall Danmark Rundt
7th Chrono des Nations
2013
1st Mountains classification Volta ao Algarve
5th Time trial, National Road Championships
2014
3rd Overall Danmark Rundt

1st Stage 3

5th Time trial, National Road Championships
2015
2nd Overall Circuit Cycliste Sarthe

1st Stage 3

8th Gran Premio di Lugano
9th Overall Dubai Tour
10th Overall Critérium International
2016
2nd Time trial, National Road Championships
10th Overall Danmark Rundt
2018
1st Stage 5 Tour of Croatia
2019
1st Stage 1 (TTT) Vuelta a España
3rd Team relay, UEC European Road Championships

=== Grand Tour general classification results timeline ===
| Grand Tour | 2012 | 2013 | 2014 | 2015 | 2016 | 2017 | 2018 | 2019 | 2020 |
|---|---|---|---|---|---|---|---|---|---|
| Giro d'Italia | 131 | 100 | — | 96 | 46 | 74 | 75 | 90 | DNF |
| Tour de France | Has not contested during his career | | | | | | | | |
| Vuelta a España | — | — | — | — | 147 | 116 | — | 128 | — |

Legend
| — | Did not compete |
| DNF | Did not finish |
