= Trofeo Banca Popolare di Vicenza =

Italian one-day road cycling race

Race details
- Date: April
- Region: Province of Vicenza
- Discipline: Road race
- Competition: UCI Europe Tour
- Type: Single day race

History
- Editions: 77 (as of 2026)
- First winner: (Italy) Giuseppe Vanzella
- Most wins: Guido Bontempi (ITA); Marino Conton (ITA); (2 wins)
- Most recent: Riccardo Lorello (ITA)

The Trofeo Banca Popolare di Vicenza (also known as Trofeo PIVA) is a professional cycling race held annually in the Province of Vicenza, Italy. It has been part of the UCI Europe Tour since 2005 in category 1.2U, meaning it is reserved for U23 riders.

== Winners ==
Year	Winner	Second	Third
1955	(Italy) Giuseppe Vanzella		
1957	(Italy) Giuliano Bernardele		
1958	(Italy) Dino Liviero		
1959	(Italy) Vendramino Bariviera		
1960	(Italy) Guido De Rosso		
1961	(Italy) Aldo Beraldo		
1962	(Italy) Mario Maino		
1963	(Italy) Flaviano Vicentini		
1964	(Italy) Giorgio Gobessi		
1965	(Italy) Battista Monti		
1966	(Italy) Luciano Soave		
1967	(Italy) Marino Conton		
1968	(Italy) Marino Conton		
1969	(Italy) Rino Carraro		
1970	(Italy) Pietro Poloni		
1971	(Czechoslovakia) Jiří Vilček		
1972	(Italy) Gino Fochesato		
1973	(Italy) Serge Parsani		
1974	(Italy) Gilberto Romagnoli		
1975	(Czechoslovakia) František Kališ		
1976	(Italy) Nazzareno Berto		
1977	(Italy) Paolo Cambi		
1978	(Italy) Fausto Stiz		
1979	(Italy) Guido Bontempi		
1980	(Italy) Guido Bontempi		
1981	(Italy) Antonio Leali		
1982	(Italy) Giancarlo Bada		
1983	(Italy) Emilio Ravasio		
1984	(Italy) Roberto Pagnin		
1985	(Sweden) Stefan Brykt		
1986	(Italy) Maurizio Fondriest		
1987	(Italy) Fabio Parise		
1988	(Italy) Fausto Boreggio		
1989	(Italy) Andrea Tozzo	(Italy) Gianluca Bordignon	
1990	(Italy) Fabio Baldato	(Italy) Andrea Tozzo	(Italy) Gianluca Bordignon
1991	(Sweden) Lars Wahlqvist	(Italy) Stefano Checchin	(Italy) Mauro Bettin
1992	(Italy) Gianluca Gorini	(Italy) Mauro Bettin	(Italy) Davide Rebellin
1993	(Italy) Remo Pasinelli	(Italy) Marco Rosani	(Italy) Nicola Loda
1994	(Italy) Ruggero Borghi	(Italy) Daniele Sgnaolin	(Italy) Alessandro Calzolari
1995	(Italy) Gabriele Dalla Valle	(Italy) Stefano Dante	(Italy) Walter Pedroni
1996	(Italy) Marzio Bruseghin	(Slovenia) Gorazd Štangelj	(Italy) Giuliano Figueras
1997	(Italy) Emanuele Negrini	(Italy) Maurizio Vandelli	(Moldova) Ruslan Ivanov
1998	(Italy) Roberto Fortunato	(Italy) Gianluca Tonetti	(Italy) Nicola Ramacciotti
1999	(Italy) Roberto Savoldi	(Ukraine) Oleksandr Fedenko	(Italy) Mirko Marini
2000	(Luxembourg) Kim Kirchen	(Italy) Lorenzo Bernucci	(Italy) Manuel Bortolotto
2001	(Ukraine) Yaroslav Popovych	(Italy) Giampaolo Caruso	(Italy) Lorenzo Bernucci
2002	(Italy) Mirco Lorenzetto	(Italy) Claudio Corioni	(Uzbekistan) Sergey Lagutin
2003	(Russia) Alexandre Bazhenov	(Italy) Mirko Allegrini	(Ukraine) Denys Kostyuk
2004	(Slovenia) Janez Brajkovič	(Slovenia) Jure Zrimšek	(Poland) Błażej Janiaczyk
2005	(Italy) Marco Vivian	(Slovenia) Grega Bole	(Italy) Alessandro Bazzana
2006	(Italy) Ermanno Capelli	(Denmark) Jan Almblad	(Italy) Manuel Belletti
2007	(Italy) Manuel Belletti	(Slovenia) Grega Bole	(Italy) Alessandro Colo
2008	(Russia) Roman Maximov	(Italy) Mirko Battaglini	(Russia) Andrey Klyuev
2009	(Italy) Davide Cimolai	(Italy) Cesare Benedetti	(Italy) Andrea Piechele
2010	(Italy) Andrea Pasqualon	(Australia) Michael Matthews	(Italy) Daniele Aldegheri
2011	(Australia) Richard Lang	(Italy) Sonny Colbrelli	(Italy) Michele Simoni
2012	(Australia) Jay McCarthy	(Belarus) Stanislau Bazhkou	(Slovenia) Klemen Štimulak
2013	(Italy) Michele Scartezzini	(Italy) Simone Andreetta	(Australia) Calvin Watson
2014	(Austria) Gregor Mühlberger	(Russia) Alexander Foliforov	(Australia) Robert Power
2015	(Austria) Felix Großschartner	(Russia) Artem Nych	(Italy) Davide Gabburo
2016	(United Kingdom) Tao Geoghegan Hart	(Switzerland) Patrick Müller	(Italy) Marco Tecchio
2017	(Ukraine) Mark Padun	(Italy) Seid Lizde	(Belarus) Aleksandr Riabushenko
2018	(Italy) Paolo Baccio	(Australia) Robert Stannard	(United Kingdom) Jake Stewart
2019	(Germany) Georg Zimmermann	(Italy) Samuele Rivi	(Italy) Giovanni Aleotti
2020	No race due to the COVID-19 pandemic in Italy		
2021	(Spain) Juan Ayuso	(Italy) Luca Colnaghi	(Italy) Antonio Puppio
2022	(Italy) Martin Marcellusi	(Italy) Marco Frigo	(Colombia) Germán Darío Gómez
2023	(Italy) Giacomo Villa	(Italy) Alessio Martinelli	(Italy) Davide De Pretto
2024	(Czech Republic) Pavel Novák	(Italy) Alessandro Pinarello	(Colombia) Diego Pescador
2025	(Italy) Filippo Turconi	(Belgium) Duarte Marivoet	(Mexico) César Macías
2026	(Italy) Riccardo Lorello	(Italy) Tommaso Bambagioni	(Belgium) Leander De Gendt
