= Seid Lizde =

Italian-born Bosnian cyclist

Personal information
- Full name: Seid Lizde
- Born: 8 July 1995 (age 31) Catania, Italy
- Height: 1.83 m (6 ft 0 in)
- Weight: 70 kg (154 lb)

Cycling career
- Sport: Cycling
- Discipline: Road
- Role: Rider
- Rider type: Time trialist

Amateur teams
- 2009–2011: Team Bosco di Orsago
- 2012: Banca della Marca–Orogildo–Orsago
- 2013: ASD Sanvendemiano Cycling Team Cieffe Forni
- 2014: Zalf Euromobil Désirée Fior
- 2015–2017: Team Colpack

Professional teams
- 2017: UAE Team Emirates (stagiaire)
- 2018: Holdsworth
- 2018: Androni Giocattoli–Sidermec (stagiaire)
- 2019: EvoPro Racing

Seid Lizde (born 8 July 1995 in Catania) is an Italian-born Bosnian cyclist, who last rode for UCI Continental team EvoPro Racing.

== Major results ==
2013
1st Time trial, Italian National Junior Road Championships
2014
2nd Time trial, Italian National Under-23 Road Championships
2nd GP Bianco di Custoza
7th Time trial, UEC European Under-23 Road Championships
2015
2nd Ruota d'Oro
2nd GP Laguna
4th Time trial, Italian National Under-23 Road Championships
2016
2nd Gran Premio Industrie del Marmo
3rd Time trial, Italian National Under-23 Road Championships
4th Gran Premio della Liberazione
6th Giro del Belvedere
2017
1st Gran Premio della Liberazione
2nd Trofeo Banca Popolare di Vicenza
2018
5th Overall Tour of China II

1st Stage 3
