= Giovanna Troldi =

Italian cyclist

Personal information
- Born: 31 October 1968 (age 57) Dolo, Italy

Cycling career
- Sport: Cycling
- Discipline: Road cycling
- Role: Rider
- Rider type: Time trialist

Professional teams
- 1999: GS Selene Rama
- 2000: Edil Savino
- 2001: Acca Due O-Lorena Camichi
- 2002: Pragma-Deia-Colnago
- 2003: S.C. Michela Fanini Rox
- 2007: Saccarelli Emu Sea Marsciano

Giovanna Troldi (born 31 October 1968) is a road cyclist from Italy.

She won the Italian National Time Trial Championships in 2002, 2003, and 2004 and represented her nation at the 2003 UCI Road World Championships.
