= Adriano Malori =

Italian road bicycle racer

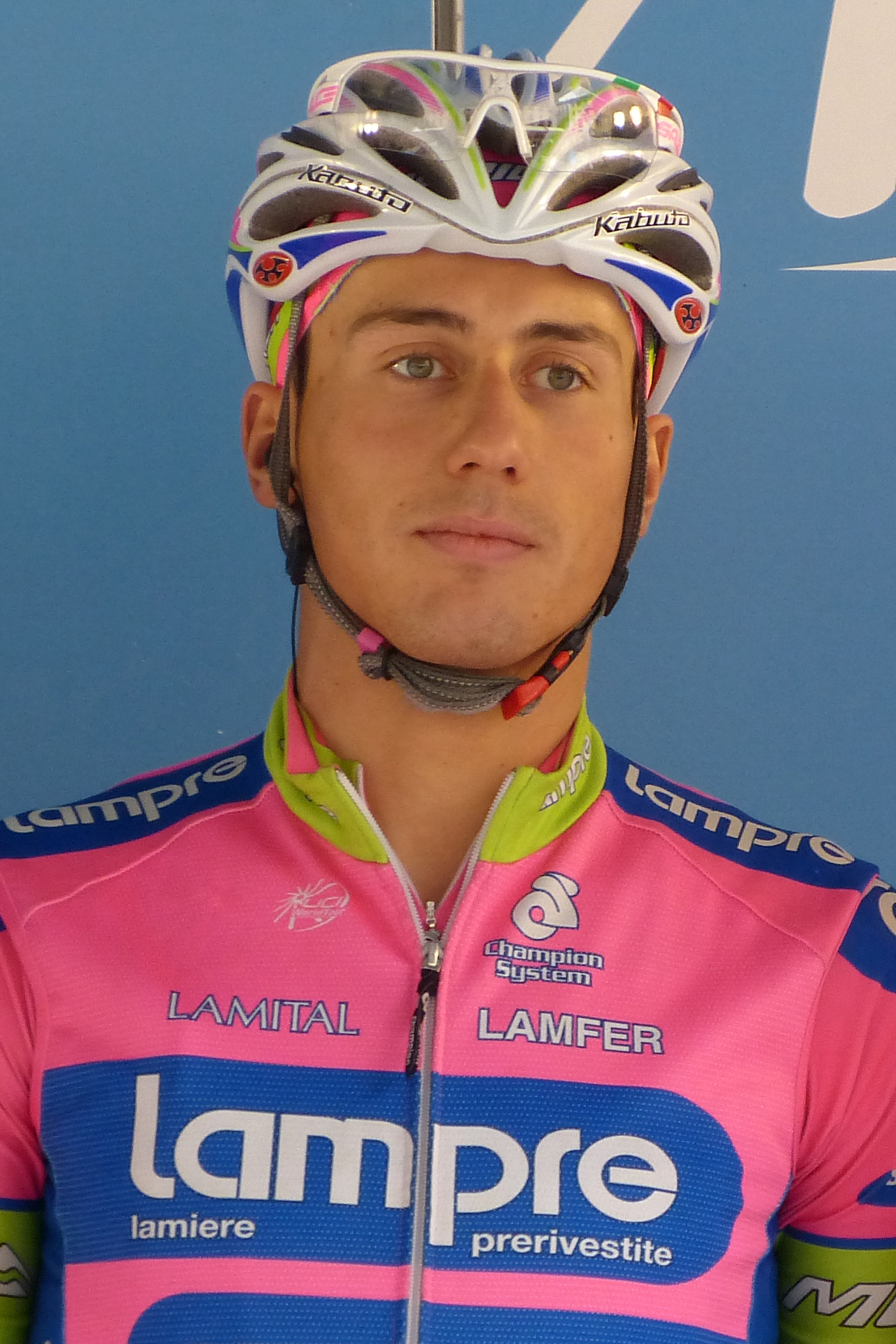
- Malori in 2013.

Personal information
- Full name: Adriano Malori
- Born: 28 January 1988 (age 38) Parma, Italy
- Height: 1.82 m (6 ft 0 in)
- Weight: 68 kg (150 lb; 10.7 st)

Cycling career
- Sport: Cycling
- Discipline: Road
- Role: Rider
- Rider type: Time trialist

Amateur teams
- 2007–2009: Filmop Ramonda Parolin
- 2009: →Lampre–NGC (stagiaire)

Professional teams
- 2010–2013: Lampre–Farnese Vini
- 2014–2017: Movistar Team

Major wins
- Grand Tours Vuelta a España 1 individual stage (2014) 1 TTT stage (2014) Stage races Bayern Rundfahrt (2013) Single-day races and Classics National Time Trial Championships (2011, 2014, 2015)
Medal record
Men's road bicycle racing
Representing Italy
World Championships
Gold medal – first place	2008 Varese	Under-23 time trial
Silver medal – second place	2015 Richmond	Time trial
Representing Movistar Team
World Championships
Bronze medal – third place	2015 Richmond	Team time trial

Adriano Malori (born 28 January 1988) is an Italian former road racing cyclist, who rode professionally between 2010 and 2017 for the Lampre–Merida and Movistar Team squads.

During his professional career, Malori took fifteen victories, primarily in individual time trials – including three victories in the Italian National Time Trial Championships, and a stage victory at the 2014 Vuelta a España. He was also the winner of the under-23 time trial at the 2008 UCI Road World Championships and the time trial at the 2009 Mediterranean Games, both held in Italy.

== Career ==
Malori was the lanterne rouge of the 2010 Tour de France, finishing almost four and a half hours behind winner Andy Schleck (Team Saxo Bank).

Having ridden for the Lampre–Merida squad since August 2009, Malori left the team at the end of the 2013 season to join the Movistar Team. He won the final time trial of the 2014 Vuelta a España.

On 23 January 2016, at the Tour de San Luis, Malori suffered a severe crash as he was leading the peloton. His front wheel was caught in a crack on the road and he flew over his bike, crashing head-first. He was put in an induced coma. Three days later, he was moved to a special clinic in Buenos Aires. Reports suggested that doctors had found the head trauma not to be a result, but rather the cause of the crash, citing a possible aneurysm. However, the team discredited them soon afterward, saying a road defect was the cause of the crash. In August, Malori announced that he would make his return to racing the following month at the Grand Prix Cycliste de Québec and Grand Prix Cycliste de Montréal.

Malori announced his retirement from professional cycling on 10 July 2017, as a result of the injury.

== Major results ==
2006
National Junior Road Championships

1st Time trial
2nd Road race

3rd Overall Giro della Lunigiana
6th Road race, UEC European Junior Road Championships
2007
1st Time trial, National Under-23 Road Championships
3rd Time trial, UEC European Under-23 Road Championships
5th Time trial, UCI Under-23 Road World Championships
2008
1st Time trial, UCI Under-23 Road World Championships
1st Time trial, UEC European Under-23 Road Championships
1st Time trial, National Under-23 Road Championships
1st Chrono Champenois
1st Trofeo Città di Castelfidardo
2nd Coppa della Pace
3rd Memorial Davide Fardelli
2009
1st Time trial, Mediterranean Games
1st Chrono Champenois
1st Stage 1a (TTT) Giro della Valle d'Aosta
2nd Time trial, National Under-23 Road Championships
3rd Gran Premio San Giuseppe
5th Time trial, UCI Under-23 Road World Championships
2010
2nd Overall Bayern Rundfahrt
3rd Time trial, National Road Championships
2011
1st Time trial, National Road Championships
5th Overall Settimana Internazionale di Coppi e Bartali

1st Stage 4 (ITT)

2012
2nd Time trial, National Road Championships
10th Time trial, UCI Road World Championships
2013
1st Overall Bayern Rundfahrt

1st Stage 4 (ITT)

1st Stage 4 (ITT) Settimana Internazionale di Coppi e Bartali
3rd Time trial, National Road Championships
8th Time trial, UCI Road World Championships
2014
1st Time trial, National Road Championships
Vuelta a España

1st Stages 1 (TTT) & 21 (ITT)
Combativity award Stage 21

1st Stage 7 (ITT) Tirreno–Adriatico
1st Stage 5 (ITT) Tour de San Luis
1st Stage 3 Route du Sud
6th Time trial, UCI Road World Championships
7th Overall Dubai Tour
2015
1st Time trial, National Road Championships
1st Stage 1 (ITT) Tirreno–Adriatico
1st Stage 5 (ITT) Tour de San Luis
UCI Road World Championships

2nd Time trial
3rd Team time trial

2nd Overall Tour du Poitou-Charentes

1st Stage 4 (ITT)

3rd Overall Circuit de la Sarthe

1st Stage 2b (ITT)

7th Chrono des Nations

=== Grand Tour general classification results timeline ===
Grand Tour	2010	2011	2012	2013	2014	2015
Giro d'Italia	—	—	68	—	121	—
Tour de France	169	90	—	DNF	—	107
Vuelta a España	—	—	—	—	114	—

Legend
—	Did not compete
DNF	Did not finish
