= 2015 Circuit de la Sarthe =

Race details
- Dates: 7–10 April 2015
- Stages: 5
- Distance: 642.8 km (399.4 mi)
- Winning time: 15h 47' 13"

Results
Jersey awarded to the overall winner	Winner	Ramūnas Navardauskas (LIT)	(Cannondale–Garmin)
	Second	Manuele Boaro (ITA)	(Tinkoff–Saxo)
	Third	Adriano Malori (ITA)	(Movistar Team)
Jersey awarded to the points classification winner	Points	Nacer Bouhanni (FRA)	(Cofidis)
Jersey awarded to the mountains classification winner	Mountains	Louis Meintjes (RSA)	(MTN–Qhubeka)
Jersey awarded to the youth classification winner	Youth	Sven Erik Bystrøm (NOR)	(Team Katusha)
	Team	Cannondale–Garmin	

The 2015 Circuit de la Sarthe (full name 2015 Circuit Cyclist Sarthe–Pays de Loire) was the 63rd edition of the Circuit de la Sarthe cycling stage race. It was run in the Sarthe department between 7 and 10 April 2015 and consisted of five stages, two of which took place on the same day. It was rated as a 2.1 event on the 2015 UCI Europe Tour. The race was won by the defending champion, Ramūnas Navardauskas (Cannondale–Garmin). Navardauskas won the race by one second ahead of Manuele Boaro (Tinkoff–Saxo), thanks to six seconds won on the final stage at intermediate sprints.

== Schedule ==
The race consisted of five stages. Two of these took place on the same day, with a short road stage in the morning and an individual time trial in the afternoon. The three flat stages were seen as opportunities for sprinters such as Nacer Bouhanni (Cofidis), who was without a victory to that point in 2015, while the time trial and the summit finish were expected to decide the general classification.

Stage	Date	Route	Distance	Type	Winner
1	7 April	Sablé-sur-Sarthe to Varades	189 km (117 mi)	Flat stage	Nacer Bouhanni (FRA)
2a	8 April	Varades to Angers	85 km (53 mi)	Flat stage	Anthony Roux (FRA)
2b	8 April	Angers to Angers	6.8 km (4 mi)	Individual time trial	Adriano Malori (ITA)
3	9 April	Angers to Pré-en-Pail	186 km (116 mi)	Summit finish	Manuele Boaro (ITA)
4	10 April	L'Épau Abbey to Le Lude	176 km (109 mi)	Flat stage	Nacer Bouhanni (FRA)

== Stages ==
=== Stage 1 ===
7 April 2015 — Sablé-sur-Sarthe to Varades, 189 km (117 mi)

Stage 1 result
Rank	Rider	Team	Time
1	Nacer Bouhanni (FRA)	Cofidis	4h 32' 27"
2	Nathan Haas (AUS)	Cannondale–Garmin	+ 0"
3	Raymond Kreder (NED)	Team Roompot	+ 0"
4	Alexey Tsatevich (RUS)	Team Katusha	+ 0"
5	Tony Hurel (FRA)	Team Europcar	+ 0"
6	Thomas Boudat (FRA)	Team Europcar	+ 0"
7	Armindo Fonseca (FRA)	Bretagne–Séché Environnement	+ 0"
8	Juan Sebastián Molano (COL)	Colombia	+ 0"
9	Enrique Sanz (ESP)	Movistar Team	+ 0"
10	Russell Downing (GBR)	Cult Energy Pro Cycling	+ 0"

General classification after stage 1
Rank	Rider	Team	Time
1	Nacer Bouhanni (FRA)	Cofidis	4h 32' 17"
2	Romain Lemarchand (FRA)	Cult Energy Pro Cycling	+ 1"
3	Nathan Haas (AUS)	Cannondale–Garmin	+ 4"
4	Jacques Janse van Rensburg (RSA)	MTN–Qhubeka	+ 4"
5	Raymond Kreder (NED)	Team Roompot	+ 6"
6	Alexey Tsatevich (RUS)	Team Katusha	+ 10"
7	Tony Hurel (FRA)	Team Europcar	+ 10"
8	Thomas Boudat (FRA)	Team Europcar	+ 10"
9	Armindo Fonseca (FRA)	Bretagne–Séché Environnement	+ 10"
10	Juan Sebastián Molano (COL)	Colombia	+ 10"

=== Stage 2a ===
8 April 2015 — Varades to Angers, 83.9 km (52 mi)

Stage 2a result
Rank	Rider	Team	Time
1	Anthony Roux (FRA)	FDJ	2h 04' 57"
2	Quentin Jaurégui (FRA)	AG2R La Mondiale	+ 0"
3	Thomas Voeckler (FRA)	Team Europcar	+ 0"
4	Nacer Bouhanni (FRA)	Cofidis	+ 5"
5	Alexey Tsatevich (RUS)	Team Katusha	+ 5"
6	Michael Kolář (SVK)	Tinkoff–Saxo	+ 5"
7	Lorrenzo Manzin (FRA)	FDJ	+ 5"
8	Marco Benfatto (ITA)	Androni Giocattoli	+ 5"
9	Raymond Kreder (NED)	Team Roompot	+ 5"
10	Geoffrey Soupe (FRA)	Cofidis	+ 5"

General classification after stage 2a
Rank	Rider	Team	Time
1	Anthony Roux (FRA)	FDJ	6h 37' 11"
2	Quentin Jaurégui (FRA)	AG2R La Mondiale	+ 5"
3	Nacer Bouhanni (FRA)	Cofidis	+ 8"
4	Thomas Voeckler (FRA)	Team Europcar	+ 8"
5	Romain Lemarchand (FRA)	Cult Energy Pro Cycling	+ 9"
6	Nathan Haas (AUS)	Cannondale–Garmin	+ 12"
7	Jacques Janse van Rensburg (RSA)	MTN–Qhubeka	+ 12"
8	Raymond Kreder (NED)	Team Roompot	+ 14"
9	Alexey Tsatevich (RUS)	Team Katusha	+ 18"
10	Thomas Boudat (FRA)	Team Europcar	+ 18"

=== Stage 2b ===
8 April 2015 — Angers to Angers, 6.8 km (4 mi), individual time trial (ITT)

Stage 2b result
Rank	Rider	Team	Time
1	Adriano Malori (ITA)	Movistar Team	7' 58"
2	Alex Dowsett (GBR)	Movistar Team	+ 9"
3	Ramūnas Navardauskas (LTU)	Cannondale–Garmin	+ 15"
4	Tiago Machado (POR)	Team Katusha	+ 16"
5	Manuele Boaro (ITA)	Tinkoff–Saxo	+ 20"
6	Jesús Herrada (ESP)	Movistar Team	+ 20"
7	Steve Cummings (GBR)	MTN–Qhubeka	+ 21"
8	Nathan Haas (AUS)	Cannondale–Garmin	+ 22"
9	Michael Valgren (DEN)	Tinkoff–Saxo	+ 22"
10	Christophe Laporte (FRA)	Cofidis	+ 25"

General classification after stage 2b
Rank	Rider	Team	Time
1	Adriano Malori (ITA)	Movistar Team	6h 45' 27"
2	Alex Dowsett (GBR)	Movistar Team	+ 9"
3	Anthony Roux (FRA)	FDJ	+ 12"
4	Ramūnas Navardauskas (LTU)	Cannondale–Garmin	+ 15"
5	Nathan Haas (AUS)	Cannondale–Garmin	+ 16"
6	Tiago Machado (POR)	Team Katusha	+ 16"
7	Manuele Boaro (ITA)	Tinkoff–Saxo	+ 20"
8	Jesús Herrada (ESP)	Movistar Team	+ 20"
9	Steve Cummings (GBR)	MTN–Qhubeka	+ 21"
10	Michael Valgren (DEN)	Tinkoff–Saxo	+ 22"

=== Stage 3 ===
9 April 2015 — Angers to Pré-en-Pail, 186 km (116 mi)

Stage 3 result
Rank	Rider	Team	Time
1	Manuele Boaro (ITA)	Tinkoff–Saxo	4h 49' 41"
2	Pierre Rolland (FRA)	Team Europcar	+ 0"
3	Jonathan Hivert (FRA)	Bretagne–Séché Environnement	+ 0"
4	Pierrick Fédrigo (FRA)	Bretagne–Séché Environnement	+ 0"
5	Arthur Vichot (FRA)	FDJ	+ 0"
6	Tiago Machado (POR)	Team Katusha	+ 0"
7	Ramūnas Navardauskas (LIT)	Cannondale–Garmin	+ 0"
8	Jan Bakelants (BEL)	AG2R La Mondiale	+ 0"
9	Steve Cummings (GBR)	MTN–Qhubeka	+ 0"
10	Nathan Haas (AUS)	Cannondale–Garmin	+ 4"

General classification after stage 3
Rank	Rider	Team	Time
1	Manuele Boaro (ITA)	Tinkoff–Saxo	11h 35' 18"
2	Adriano Malori (ITA)	Movistar Team	+ 3"
3	Ramūnas Navardauskas (LTU)	Cannondale–Garmin	+ 5"
4	Tiago Machado (POR)	Team Katusha	+ 6"
5	Nathan Haas (AUS)	Cannondale–Garmin	+ 10"
6	Steve Cummings (GBR)	MTN–Qhubeka	+ 11"
7	Arthur Vichot (FRA)	FDJ	+ 20"
8	Pierre Rolland (FRA)	Team Europcar	+ 20"
9	Jan Bakelants (BEL)	AG2R La Mondiale	+ 21"
10	Pierrick Fédrigo (FRA)	Bretagne–Séché Environnement	+ 23"

=== Stage 4 ===
10 April 2015 — L'Épau Abbey to Le Lude, 176 km (109 mi)

Stage 4 result
Rank	Rider	Team	Time
1	Nacer Bouhanni (FRA)	Cofidis	4h 11' 56"
2	Alexey Tsatevich (RUS)	Team Katusha	+ 0"
3	Samuel Dumoulin (FRA)	AG2R La Mondiale	+ 0"
4	Tony Hurel (FRA)	Bretagne–Séché Environnement	+ 0"
5	Leonardo Duque (COL)	Colombia	+ 0"
6	Armindo Fonseca (FRA)	Bretagne–Séché Environnement	+ 0"
7	Ramūnas Navardauskas (LTU)	Cannondale–Garmin	+ 0"
8	Raymond Kreder (NED)	Team Roompot	+ 0"
9	Jan Bakelants (BEL)	AG2R La Mondiale	+ 0"
10	Sven Erik Bystrøm (NOR)	Team Katusha	+ 0"

Final general classification
Rank	Rider	Team	Time
1	Ramūnas Navardauskas (LTU)	Cannondale–Garmin	15h 47' 13"
2	Manuele Boaro (ITA)	Tinkoff–Saxo	+ 1"
3	Adriano Malori (ITA)	Movistar Team	+ 4"
4	Tiago Machado (POR)	Team Katusha	+ 7"
5	Nathan Haas (AUS)	Cannondale–Garmin	+ 9"
6	Steve Cummings (GBR)	MTN–Qhubeka	+ 12"
7	Jan Bakelants (BEL)	AG2R La Mondiale	+ 20"
8	Arthur Vichot (FRA)	FDJ	+ 21"
9	Pierrick Fédrigo (FRA)	Bretagne–Séché Environnement	+ 24"
10	Alexey Tsatevich (RUS)	Team Katusha	+ 26"
