= Vittoria Bussi =

Italian cyclist (born 1987)

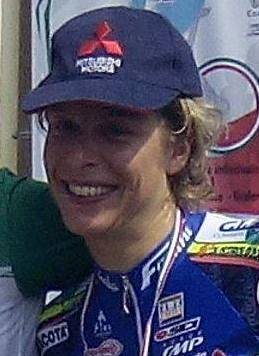
- Bussi after taking 3rd place at the 2014 Italian National Time Trial Championships

Personal information
- Born: 19 March 1987 (age 39) Rome, Italy

Cycling career
- Sport: Cycling
- Role: Rider

Professional teams
- 2014: S.C. Michela Fanini Rox
- 2015: Servetto Footon

Major wins
- Other UCI Hour record: 50.455 km

Vittoria Bussi (born 19 March 1987) is an Italian professional racing cyclist. She holds a DPhil in pure mathematics from the University of Oxford for the 2014 thesis Derived Symplectic Structures in Generalized Donaldson–Thomas Theory and Categorification.

In September 2018, she set a new UCI Women's hour record, riding 48.007 kilometres (29.830 mi) at the Aguascalientes Bicentenary Velodrome, Aguascalientes, Mexico, beating the previous record set by Evelyn Stevens in 2016 by 27 metres. It was Bussi's third attempt at the record, having fallen short of Stevens' performance in Aguascalientes in October 2017 by 404 metres and having abandoned a second attempt after 40 minutes the day before her record-breaking ride.

Later, on October 13, 2023, Bussi set another UCI Women's hour record, at the Velodromo Bicentenario in Mexico, with a 50.267 km distance. She broke the hour record again on 10 May 2025 with a distance of 50.455 km, also on the Velodromo Bicentenario in Aguascalientes, Mexico.

== Major results ==
2014
3rd Italian National Time Trial Championships
2015
6th Chrono Champenois
2016
5th Italian National Time Trial Championships
2018
2nd Italian National Time Trial Championships
5th Chrono des Nations
2019
2nd Italian National Time Trial Championships
4th Chrono des Nations
2020
2nd Italian National Time Trial Championships
3rd Mixed team relay, UEC European Road Championships
10th UCI Road World Championships – Women's time trial
2021
1st Stage 1 Tour de Feminin
5th Chrono des Nations
2022
4th Italian National Time Trial Championships
