= Antonio Puppio =

Italian cyclist (born 1999)

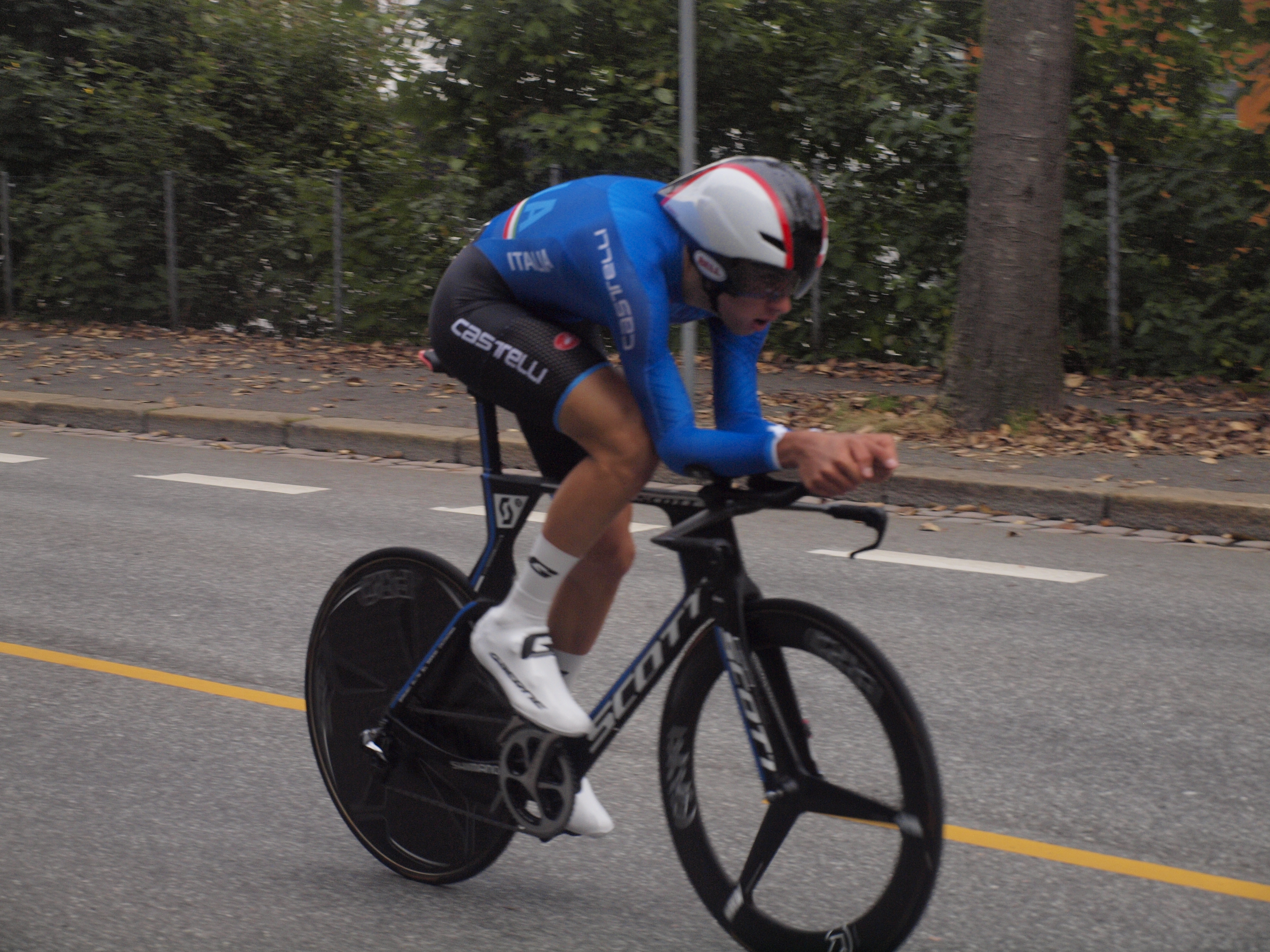
- Puppio at the 2017 UCI Road World Championships

Personal information
- Born: 18 April 1999 (age 27) Samarate, Italy
- Height: 1.86 m (6 ft 1 in)
- Weight: 75 kg (165 lb)

Cycling career
- Sport: Cycling
- Discipline: Road
- Role: Rider

Amateur teams
- 2012–2013: San Macario Valerio Biolo
- 2014–2015: TeamPro Bike Junior
- 2016: Bustese Olonia
- 2018: Viris L&L–Sisal–Matchpoint

Professional teams
- 2018: Cofidis (stagiaire)
- 2019–2020: Kometa Cycling Team
- 2021: Team Qhubeka
- 2022: Israel Cycling Academy
- 2023: Q36.5 Pro Cycling Team

Antonio Puppio (born 18 April 1999) is an Italian cyclist, who most recently rode for UCI ProTeam Q36.5 Pro Cycling Team.

== Major results ==
2017
1st Time trial, National Junior Road Championships
2nd Time trial, UCI Junior Road World Championships
10th Time trial, European Junior Road Championships
10th Trofeo comune di Vertova Memorial Pietro Merelli
2019
3rd Time trial, National Under-23 Road Championships
8th Trofej Umag
10th Time trial, European Under-23 Road Championships
10th L'Etoile d'Or
2021
2nd Ruota d'Oro
3rd Overall Giro della Regione Friuli Venezia Giulia

1st Points classification

3rd Trofeo Piva
5th Time trial, National Under-23 Road Championships
6th Coppa Bernocchi
9th Il Piccolo Lombardia
