= Zugno =

Zugno is an Italian surname. Notable people with the surname include:

- Anna Zugno (born 1984), Italian road cyclist
- Francesco Zugno (c. 1708–1787), Italian painter of the Rococo period
