= Abdulmalek Al-Khaibri =

Saudi Arabian footballer

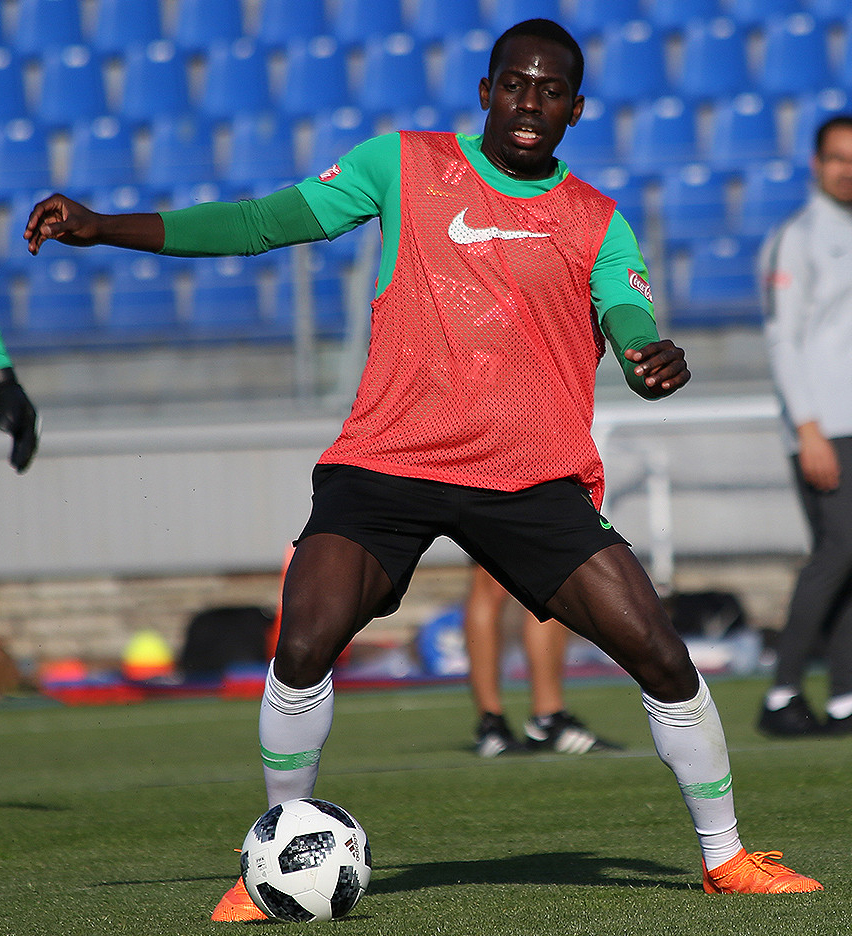
- Al-Khaibri training with Saudi Arabia at the 2018 FIFA World Cup

Personal information
- Full name: Abdulmalek Abdullah Al-Khaibri
- Date of birth: 13 March 1986 (age 40)
- Place of birth: Riyadh, Saudi Arabia
- Height: 1.77 m (5 ft 10 in)
- Position: Defensive midfielder

Youth career
- 2003–2007: Al-Qadsiah

Senior career*
Years	Team	Apps	(Gls)
2007–2008	Al-Qadsiah	3	(0)
2008–2016	Al-Shabab	118	(2)
2016–2019	Al-Hilal	36	(0)
2019–2021	Al-Shabab	21	(0)
2022	Al-Riyadh	15	(1)

International career^{‡}
2010–2022	Saudi Arabia	36	(0)
- * Club domestic league appearances and goals as of 18:14, 30 May 2021 (UTC) ‡ National team caps and goals as of 20:00, 3 June 2019 (UTC)

Abdulmalek Abdullah Al-Khaibri (Arabic: عبدالملك الخيبري; born 13 March 1986) is a Saudi Arabian former football player who plays as a midfielder.

== Club career ==
Al-Khaibri played for Al-Qadisiyah between 2007 and 2008. During the summer of 2008, Al-Khaibri was at the center of controversy when he signed for both Al-Nassr and Al-Shabab. The Saudi Arabian Football Federation eventually ruled in favor of Al-Shabab and Al-Khaibri was suspended for four months.

=== Al-Shabab ===
Al-Khaibri made his debut for Al-Shabab on 30 November 2008 in the league match against Al-Raed. In his first season at the club, he managed to win the King Cup and Federation Cup. During the 2011–12 season, Al-Khaibri made 11 league appearances as Al-Shabab managed to win the league title and finish the season unbeaten. He scored his first goal for the club against Hajer on 25 November 2011. On 1 March 2013, Al-Khaibri signed a new three-year deal with Al-Shabab. In the 2013–14 season, Al-Khaibri played in all 6 matches of the King Cup as Al-Shabab went on to win their third title. After entering the last six months of his contract, Al-Khaibri refused to renew his contract and left at the end of the 2015–16 season.

=== Al-Hilal ===
On 5 June 2016, Al-Khaibri joined city rivals Al-Hilal on a free transfer. He signed a three-year deal with the club. In his first season, the club won the League and Cup double.

=== Al-Shabab return ===
On 6 July 2019, Al-Khaibri joined Al-Shabab on a free transfer.

== International career ==
In May 2018 he was named in Saudi Arabia's squad for the 2018 FIFA World Cup in Russia, although he did not play in any of the matches.

== Career statistics ==
=== Club ===
As of match played 30 May 2021

Club	Season	League		King Cup		Crown Prince Cup		Asia		Other		Total	
Club	Season	Apps	Goals	Apps	Goals	Apps	Goals	Apps	Goals	Apps	Goals	Apps	Goals
Al-Shabab	2008–09	7	0	3	0	2	0	3	0	—		15	0
Al-Shabab	2009–10	7	0	3	0	2	0	9	0	—		21	0
Al-Shabab	2010–11	19	0	2	0	0	0	7	0	—		28	0
Al-Shabab	2011–12	11	1	0	0	2	0	—		—		13	1
Al-Shabab	2012–13	11	0	3	0	0	0	10	0	—		24	0
Al-Shabab	2013–14	22	1	6	0	2	0	7	0	—		37	1
Al-Shabab	2014–15	18	0	1	0	0	0	6	0	1 (Note: Appearances in Saudi Super Cup)	0	26	0
Al-Shabab	2015–16	23	0	2	0	3	0	—		—		28	0
Al-Shabab	Total	118	2	20	0	11	0	42	0	1	0	192	2
Al-Hilal	2016–17	21	0	4	0	3	0	12	0	1	0	41	0
Al-Hilal	2017–18	9	0	0	0	—		5	0	—		14	0
Al-Hilal	2018–19	6	0	1	0	—		3	0	4 (Note: Appearances in Arab Club Champions Cup)	0	14	0
Al-Hilal	Total	36	0	5	0	3	0	20	0	5	0	69	0
Al-Shabab	2019–20	20	0	1	0	—		—		4	0	25	0
Al-Shabab	2020–21	1	0	0	0	—		—		0	0	1	0
Al-Shabab	Total	21	0	1	0	0	0	0	0	4	0	26	0
Career totals		175	2	26	0	14	0	62	0	10	0	287	2

=== International ===
Statistics accurate as of match played 14 June 2018.

Saudi Arabia
Year	Apps	Goals
2010	1	0
2011	0	0
2012	2	0
2013	0	0
2014	6	0
2015	6	0
2016	8	0
2017	9	0
2018	3	0
Total	35	0

== Honours ==
Al-Shabab

- Pro League: 2011–12
- King Cup: 2009, 2014
- Saudi Super Cup: 2014
- Saudi Federation Cup: 2008–09, 2009–10

Al-Hilal

- Pro League: 2016–17, 2017–18
- King Cup: 2017
- Saudi Super Cup: 2018
