= Alan Marangoni =

Italian cyclist

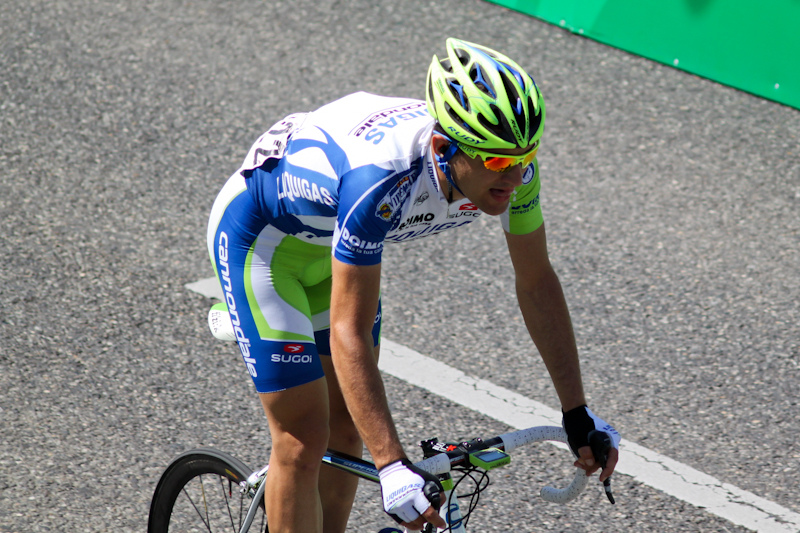
- Marangoni at the 2011 Tour de Romandie

Personal information
- Full name: Alan Marangoni
- Born: 16 July 1984 (age 42) Lugo, Italy
- Height: 1.85 m (6 ft 1 in)
- Weight: 76 kg (168 lb)

Cycling career
- Sport: Cycling
- Current team: Retired
- Discipline: Road
- Role: Rider
- Rider type: Time trialist

Amateur teams
- 2003–2005: Eternedile–Pedale Ozzanese
- 2006–2008: U.S. Fausto Coppi Gazzera

Professional teams
- 2009–2010: CSF Group–Navigare
- 2011–2014: Liquigas–Cannondale
- 2015–2016: Cannondale–Garmin
- 2017–2018: Nippo–Vini Fantini

Alan Marangoni (born 16 July 1984) is an Italian former professional road racing cyclist, who rode professionally between 2009 and 2018 for the Colnago–CSF Inox, Cannondale, Cannondale–Drapac and Nippo–Vini Fantini–Europa Ovini teams.

== Personal ==
Born on 16 July 1984, in Lugo, Emilia-Romagna, Marangoni resides in Cotignola, Emilia-Romagna, Italy.

== Career ==
Marangoni turned professional in 2009, competing with CSF Group–Navigare, a UCI Professional Continental team, for the 2009 and 2010 seasons.

Marangoni signed with Liquigas–Cannondale, a UCI ProTeam, for the 2011 season. He remained with Liquigas–Cannondale for the 2012, 2013, and 2014 seasons.

He signed with Cannondale–Garmin, a UCI ProTeam, for the 2015 season.

In October 2018, Marangoni confirmed that he would be retiring from competition, and that he would take up a role working in television. He now works as a presenter for the Global Cycling Network.

== Major results ==
2006
1st Time trial, National Under-23 Road Championships
2008
1st Stage 5 Giro della Regione Friuli Venezia Giulia
2nd Memorial Davide Fardelli
10th Coppa della Pace
2011
3rd Time trial, National Road Championships
10th Overall Tour de Luxembourg
2012
6th Time trial, National Road Championships
2013
7th Time trial, National Road Championships
2014
3rd Time trial, National Road Championships
9th Team time trial, UCI Road World Championships
2015
4th Time trial, National Road Championships
2016
1st Stage 1 (TTT) Czech Cycling Tour
9th Time trial, National Road Championships
2017
3rd Overall Tour of Thailand
2018
1st Tour de Okinawa

=== Grand Tour general classification results timeline ===
Grand Tour	2010	2011	2012	2013	2014	2015
Giro d'Italia	107	140	—	114	137	131
Tour de France	—	—	—	111	—	—
Vuelta a España	—	137	—	—	—	—

Legend
—	Did not compete
DNF	Did not finish
