= Paolo Baccio =

Italian cyclist (born 1997)

Personal information
- Full name: Paolo Baccio
- Born: 23 September 1997 (age 29)

Cycling career
- Sport: Cycling
- Discipline: Road
- Role: Rider

Amateur team
- 2016–2018: G.S. Mastromarco–Sensi–Cipros

Professional team
- 2019: Team Colpack

Paolo Baccio (born 23 September 1997) is an Italian professional racing cyclist, who last rode for UCI Continental team Team Colpack.

== Major results ==
2016
4th Time trial, National Under-23 Road Championships
2017
8th Trofeo Piva
2018
1st Trofeo Piva
3rd Time trial, National Under-23 Road Championships
4th Time trial, Mediterranean Games
2019
3rd Gran Premio Industrie del Marmo
