= Ermanno Capelli =

Italian cyclist

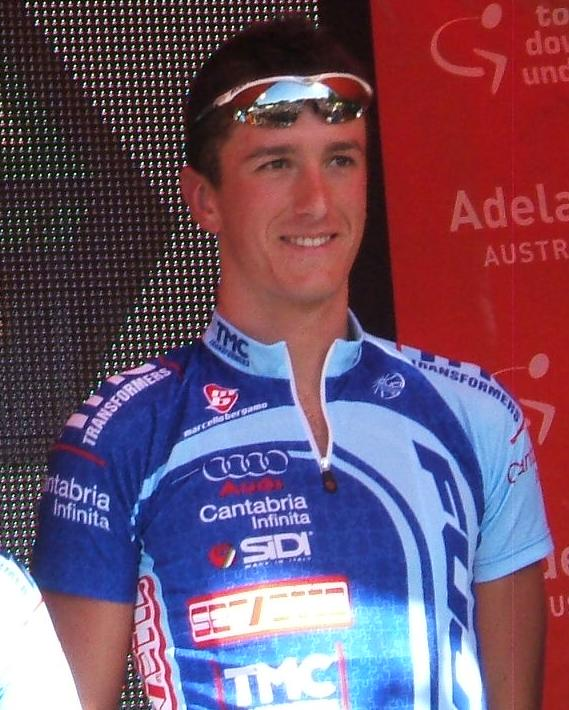

Personal information
- Full name: Ermanno Capelli
- Born: 9 May 1985 (age 41) Ponte San Pietro, Italy
- Height: 1.95 m (6 ft 5 in)
- Weight: 78 kg (172 lb)

Cycling career
- Sport: Cycling
- Discipline: Road
- Role: Rider

Amateur teams
- 2004–2005: Egidio Unidelta Colibrí
- 2006–2007: Unidelta Bottoli Arvedi

Professional teams
- 2008–2010: Saunier Duval–Scott
- 2011: Team Vorarlberg

Ermanno Capelli (born 9 May 1985 in Ponte San Pietro, Italy) is an Italian former road racing cyclist, who competed as a professional from 2008 to 2011.

== Major results ==
2003
1st Trofeo Emilio Paganessi
2006
1st Trofeo Piva
1st Gran Premio Palio del Recioto
3rd Time trial, National Under-23 Road Championships
8th Gran Premio San Giuseppe
2007
2nd Coppa San Geo
3rd Gran Premio Palio del Recioto
3rd Piccola Sanremo
2010
5th GP di Lugano
