= Luca Ascani =

Italian cyclist (born 1983)

Personal information
- Born: 29 June 1983 (age 43) Loreto, Italy

Cycling career
- Sport: Cycling
- Discipline: Road
- Role: Rider

Professional teams
- 2005–2007: Aurum Hotels
- 2010–2011: CDC–Cavaliere
- 2012: Farnese Vini–Selle Italia

Luca Ascani (born 29 June 1983, in Loreto) is an Italian racing cyclist. He was suspended for doping between June 2007 and August 2009.

== Palmares ==
2005
1st stage 7 Tour of Qinghai Lake
2007
1st Giro d'Abruzzo

1st stage 1

2010
1st Tour de Serbie
2011
3rd Giro del Trentino
