= Francesco Tomei =

Italian cyclist

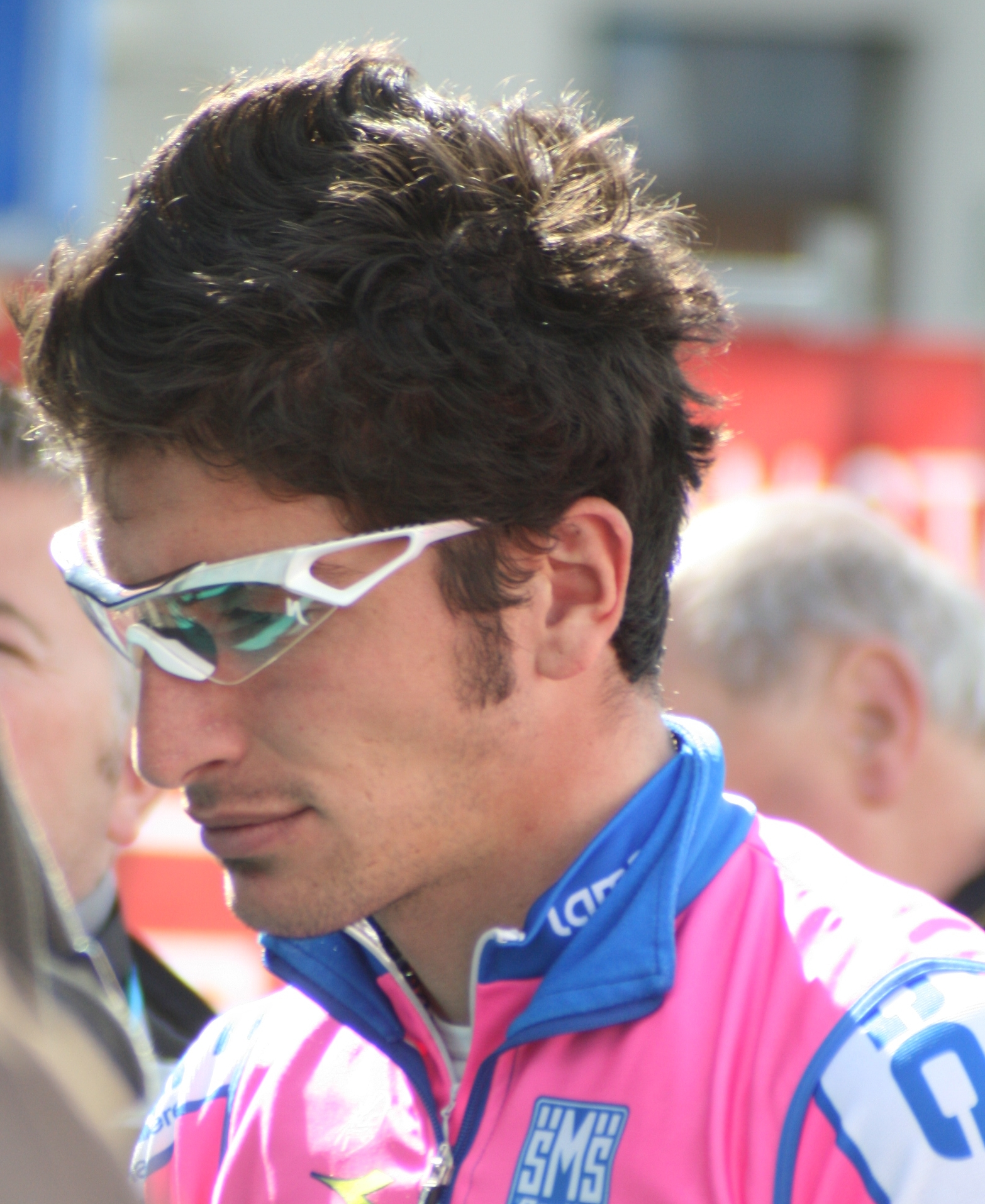

Personal information
- Born: 19 May 1985 (age 41) Lucca, italy

Cycling career
- Sport: Cycling
- Discipline: Road
- Role: Rider

Professional teams
- 2007–2008: Ceramica Panaria-Navigare
- 2009: Lampre-NGC
- 2010: ISD-Neri

Francesco Tomei (born 19 May 1985 in Lucca) is an Italian cyclist. He rode in the 2009 Vuelta a España.

== Palmares ==
2005
2nd U23 National Time Trial Championships
2006
2nd U23 National Time Trial Championships
