= Maria Paola Turcutto =

Italian cyclist

Personal information
- Full name: Maria Paola Turcutto
- Born: 2 January 1965 (age 61) Rome, Italy

Cycling career
- Sport: Cycling
- Discipline: Road cycling
- Role: Rider

Maria Paola Turcutto (born 2 January 1965) is a road cyclist from Italy. She represented her nation at the 1992 Summer Olympics in the women's road race.
