= Davide Belletti =

Open water swimmer, Winter swimmer

Personal information
- Native name: Davide Belletti
- Nationality: Italian
- Born: Parma, Italy
- Height: 181 cm (5 ft 11 in)
- Weight: 85 Kg (2025)

Sport
- Country: Italy
- Sport: Long distance swimmer and Winter swimmer

Achievements and titles
- World finals: 3rd - 1000 m M50-55 Ice Swimming World Championship (Molveno 2025)
- Regional finals: 2° - 1500 m M40 Regional Masters Championships (Bologna 2019)
Medal record
Men's ice swimming
Representing Italy
Event	1st	2nd	3rd
World Ice Swimming Championship	–	–	1
Total	0	0	1

Davide Belletti Davide Belletti (born in Parma, Italy) is an Italian swimmer specializing in long-distance and cold water swimming.

In 2023, he was awarded the "Best Athlete of the Month" by the National Union of Sports Veterans and Panathlon.

== Career ==
=== Early career and transition to long distance ===
Belletti began swimming in 2014 during rehabilitation following a shoulder injury. He joined Villa Bonelli Nuoto ASD and competed in regional freestyle events before moving to open water competitions.

=== Open water and marathon swimming ===
- In 2015, he participated in the Byron Cup in the Gulf of La Spezia.
- From 2015 to 2017, he competed in the "Oceanman Lake Orta" (14 km), placing 14th in 2017.
- In September 2017, he completed a solo crossing of the Strait of Bonifacio (15 km) under FINA rules.

=== Charity and endurance events ===
- In 2018, he organized a 22 km swim from Portovenere to Monterosso to support a humanitarian project in Ethiopia.
- In 2020, he won the “Longest Distance” category at the 6-Hour Swim in Castelnuovo ne’ Monti and swam the full perimeter of Lake Orta (29 km).
- In 2021, he swam 30 km during a 12-hour charity event and joined the International Ice Swimming Association (IISA).

=== Ice swimming ===
- In 2021, he placed 1st in both the 800 m and combined ranking at a cold water event in Lake Avigliana.
- In 2022, he finished 6th (250 m) and 7th (500 m) at the IISA World Championships in Głogów, Poland.
- In 2023, he was 8th in the 1000 m at the World Championships in Samoëns, France.
- In 2025 he earned 3rd place in the 1000 m (M50–55) category at the World Championships in Molveno, Italy with a time achieved in 1.94 °C water that was also recognized as an IISA world record.

=== Coaching and technical roles ===
Since 2022, Belletti has worked as a certified swimming instructor and, from 2024, as a licensed coach for the Italian Swimming Federation (FIN). He also collaborates with the International Ice Swimming Association (IISA) as observer and event director, and held the role of race director at the 6th World Ice Swimming Championship (2025) and the 2nd European Open Ice Swimming Championship in Molveno (2026).

== Palmares ==
Year	Meet	Host city	Ranking	Distance	Cat.
2019	Regional Masters Championships	(Italy) Riccione	4º	1500 m	M. 40
2019	Regional Masters Championships	(Italy) Bologna	2º	1500 m	M. 40
2022	Ice Swimming World Championships	(Poland) Glogow	6º	250 m	M. 45-49
2022	Ice Swimming World Championships	(Poland) Glogow	7º	500 m	M. 45-49
2023	Ice Swimming World Championships	(France) Samoëns	7º	500 m	M. 45-49
2023	Ice Swimming World Championships	(France) Samoëns	8º	1000 m	M. 45-49
2025	Ice Swimming World Championships	(Italy) Molveno	10°	250 m	M. 50-55
2025	Ice Swimming World Championships	(Italy) Molveno	9°	500 m	M. 50-55
2025	Regional Masters Championships	(Italy) Riccione	2º	1500 m	M. 50
2025	Ice Swimming World Championships	(Italy) Molveno	3°	1000 m	M. 50-55
