= Gabriella Pregnolato =

Italian cyclist

Personal information
- Born: 30 May 1971 (age 55)

Cycling career
- Sport: Cycling

Gabriella Pregnolato (born 30 May 1971) is an Italian former cyclist. She competed in the women's individual pursuit at the 1992 Summer Olympics.

== Major results ==
1996
8th UCI Road World Championships – Women's time trial
