= Nicolás Milesi =

Uruguayan footballer (born 1992)

Nicolas Milesi
Personal information
- Full name: Nicolás Milesi Van Lommel
- Date of birth: 10 November 1992 (age 34)
- Place of birth: Young, Uruguay
- Height: 1.81 m (5 ft 11 in)
- Position: Central midfielder

Youth career
- 2010–2011: Torque
- 2011–2012: Toluca

Senior career*
Years	Team	Apps	(Gls)
2012–2014	Torque	42	(6)
2014	Atlético Paranaense	0	(0)
2014–2015	Danubio	12	(0)
2015–2016	Plaza Colonia	27	(2)
2016–2018	Al-Hilal	36	(3)
2018–2019	Al Dhafra	21	(1)
2019–2020	Al Wahda	9	(0)
2020	Libertad	10	(0)
2021–2022	Montevideo City	18	(0)
2022–2023	Peñarol	12	(0)
2023	Al-Ahli	15	(0)
2023	Plaza Colonia	3	(0)
2023–2024	Ohod		
- * Club domestic league appearances and goals as of 12 April 2018

Nicolás Milesi Van Lommel (born 10 November 1992 in Young) is a Uruguayan professional footballer who plays as a midfielder.

== Club career ==
Born in Young, Milesi graduated from Club Atlético Torque's youth system.

In early 2012, Milesi travelled to Mexico to be tested by Deportivo Toluca. He remained six months playing for the youth team.

He made his professional debut on 20 October 2012 scoring a goal, in a 3–3 away draw against Rampla Juniors. He entered in the 75th minute replacing Jesús Toscanini, and 7 minutes later scored a goal.

On 7 January 2014 he moved to Danubio; however, a month later, Milesi joined Brazilian Série A side Atlético Paranaense. He never played for the first team and was sent to the reserve squad, so six months later he returned to Uruguay, and played two years for Danubio.

On 5 August 2016, Milesi signed a professional contract with Saudi Club Al-Hilal, and he won the Saudi Professional League in the first season.

On 28 January 2023, Milesi joined Saudi Arabian club Al-Ahli on a six-month contract.

On 6 September 2023, Milesi joined Ohod.

== Career statistics ==
As of 3 September 2023

Club	Season	League			Cup		League Cup		Continental		Other		Total	
Club	Season	Division	Apps	Goals	Apps	Goals	Apps	Goals	Apps	Goals	Apps	Goals	Apps	Goals
Torque	2012–13	Segunda División	24	3	—		—		—		6	1	30	4
Torque	2013–14	Segunda División	12	2	—		—		—		—		12	2
Torque	Total		36	5	0	0	0	0	0	0	6	1	42	6
Danubio	2014–15	Primera División	12	0	—		—		5	0	—		17	0
Plaza Colonia	2015–16	Primera División	27	2	—		—		—		—		27	2
Al-Hilal	2016–17	Saudi Pro League	18	1	3	1	—		8	2	1	0	30	4
Al-Hilal	2017–18	Saudi Pro League	18	2	1	0	—		9	0	—		28	2
Al-Hilal	Total		36	3	4	1	0	0	17	2	1	0	58	6
Al Dhafra	2018–19	UAE Pro League	21	1	4	0	5	0	—		—		30	1
Al Wahda	2019–20	UAE Pro League	9	0	1	0	6	0	2	0	—		18	0
Libertad	2020	Paraguayan Primera División	10	0	—		—		2	0	—		12	0
Montevideo City	2021	Primera División	6	0	—		—		—		—		6	0
Montevideo City	2022	Primera División	12	0	—		—		2	0	—		14	0
Montevideo City	Total		18	0	0	0	0	0	2	0	0	0	20	0
Peñarol	2022	Primera División	12	0	3	0	—		—		—		15	0
Al-Ahli	2022–23	First Division League	13	0	—		—		—		—		13	0
Plaza Colonia	2023	Primera División	3	0	—		—		—		—		3	0
Career total			197	11	12	1	11	0	28	2	7	1	255	13

== Honours ==
=== Al Hilal ===
- Saudi Professional League (2): 2016–17, 2017–18
- King Cup of Champions : 2017
