= List of 2019 UCI WorldTeams and riders =

This page is a list of 2019 UCI WorldTeams and riders. These teams are competing in the 2019 UCI World Tour.

== Teams overview ==
The 18 WorldTeams in 2019 are:

2019 UCI World Teams and equipment
Code	Official Team Name	Country	Groupset	Road Bike(s)	Time Trial Bike	Wheels
ALM	AG2R La Mondiale (2019 season)	France	Campagnolo	Eddy Merckx EM25	Eddy Merckx	Mavic
AST	Astana (2019 season)	Kazakhstan	Shimano/FSA	Argon 18 Gallium Pro; Argon 18 Nitrogen Pro; Argon Krypton	E-118 Next	Vision
TBM	Bahrain–Merida (2019 season)	Bahrain	Shimano	Merida Scultura; Merida Reacto	Merida Warp TT	Fulcrum
BOH	Bora–Hansgrohe (2019 season)	Germany	Shimano	S-Works Venge; S-Works Tarmac; S-Works Roubaix	S-Works Shiv	Roval
CPT	CCC Team (2019 season)	Poland	Shimano	Giant TCR Advanced SL 0 Giant Propel Advanced SL; Giant Defy Advanced SL	Giant Trinity Advanced Pro	Giant
DQT	Deceuninck–Quick-Step (2019 season)	Belgium	Shimano	S-Works Venge; S-Works Tarmac; S-Works Roubaix	S-Works Shiv	Roval
EF1	EF Education First (2019 season)	United States	Shimano/FSA	Cannondale SuperSix EVO; Cannondale Synapse; Cannondale SystemSix	Cannondale Slice	Vision
GFC	Groupama–FDJ (2019 season)	France	Shimano	Lapierre Xelius SL; Lapierre Aircode SL; Lapierre Pulsium	Lapierre Aerostorm	Shimano
LTS	Lotto–Soudal (2019 season)	Belgium	Campagnolo	Ridley Helium SLX; Ridley Noah Fast; Ridley Fenix SLX	Ridley Dean Fast	Campagnolo
MTS	Mitchelton–Scott (2019 season)	Australia	Shimano	Scott Foil; Scott Addict; Scott Speedster	Scott Plasma	Shimano
MOV	Movistar Team (2019 season)	Spain	Campagnolo	Canyon Ultimate CF SLX; Canyon Aeroad CF SLX; Canyon Endurace CF SLX	Canyon Speedmax CF SLX	Campagnolo
TDD	Team Dimension Data (2019 season)	South Africa	Shimano	BMC Teammachine SLR01; BMC Timemachine; BMC Roadmachine	BMC Timemachine 01	Enve
TJV	Team Jumbo–Visma (2019 season)	Netherlands	Shimano	Bianchi Oltre XR4; Bianchi Specialissima; Bianchi Infinito CV	Bianchi Aquila CV	Shimano
TKA	Team Katusha–Alpecin (2019 season)	Switzerland	SRAM	Canyon Ultimate CF SLX; Canyon Aeroad CF SLX; Canyon Endurace CF SLX	Canyon Speedmax CF SLX	Zipp
INS	Team Ineos (2019 season)	Great Britain	Shimano	Pinarello Dogma F12; Pinarello Dogma FS	Pinarello Bolide	Shimano
SUN	Team Sunweb (2019 season)	Germany	Shimano	Cervélo S5; Cervélo R5; Cervélo C3	Cervélo P5	Shimano
TFS	Trek–Segafredo (2019 season)	United States	SRAM	Trek Emonda; Trek Madone; Trek Domane SLR	Trek Speed Concept	Bontrager
UAD	UAE Team Emirates (2019 season)	United Arab Emirates	Campagnolo	Colnago V2R; Colnago Concept; Colnago C64	Colnago M.Zero	Campagnolo

== Riders ==
The composition of the 18 teams is as follows:

=== AG2R La Mondiale ===
Rider	Date of birth
Gediminas Bagdonas (LTU)	26 December 1985 (aged 33)
Romain Bardet (FRA)	9 November 1990 (aged 28)
François Bidard (FRA)	19 March 1992 (aged 26)
Geoffrey Bouchard (FRA)	1 April 1992 (aged 26)
Clément Champoussin (FRA)	29 May 1998 (aged 20)
Mikaël Cherel (FRA)	17 March 1986 (aged 32)
Clément Chevrier (FRA)	29 June 1992 (aged 26)
Benoît Cosnefroy (FRA)	17 October 1995 (aged 23)
Nico Denz (GER)	15 February 1994 (aged 24)
Silvan Dillier (SUI)	3 August 1990 (aged 28)
Axel Domont (FRA)	7 August 1990 (aged 28)
Samuel Dumoulin (FRA)	20 August 1980 (aged 38)
Hubert Dupont (FRA)	13 November 1980 (aged 38)
Julien Duval (FRA)	27 May 1990 (aged 28)
Mathias Frank (SUI)	9 December 1986 (aged 32)
Tony Gallopin (FRA)	24 May 1988 (aged 30)

Rider	Date of birth
Ben Gastauer (LUX)	14 November 1987 (aged 31)
Alexandre Geniez (FRA)	16 April 1988 (aged 30)
Dorian Godon (FRA)	25 May 1996 (aged 22)
Alexis Gougeard (FRA)	5 March 1993 (aged 25)
Jaakko Hänninen (FIN)	16 April 1997 (aged 21)
Quentin Jaurégui (FRA)	22 April 1994 (aged 24)
Matteo Jorgenson (USA)	1 July 1999 (aged 19)
Anthony Jullien (FRA)	5 March 1998 (aged 20)
Pierre Latour (FRA)	12 October 1993 (aged 25)
Oliver Naesen (BEL)	16 September 1990 (aged 28)
Aurélien Paret-Peintre (FRA)	27 February 1996 (aged 22)
Nans Peters (FRA)	12 March 1994 (aged 24)
Stijn Vandenbergh (BEL)	25 April 1984 (aged 34)
Clément Venturini (FRA)	16 October 1993 (aged 25)
Alexis Vuillermoz (FRA)	1 June 1988 (aged 30)
Lawrence Warbasse (USA)	28 June 1990 (aged 28)

=== Astana ===
Rider	Date of birth
Davide Ballerini (ITA)	21 September 1994 (aged 24)
Pello Bilbao (ESP)	25 February 1990 (aged 28)
Zhandos Bizhigitov (KAZ)	10 June 1991 (aged 27)
Manuele Boaro (ITA)	12 March 1987 (aged 31)
Hernando Bohórquez (COL)	22 June 1992 (aged 26)
Dario Cataldo (ITA)	17 March 1985 (aged 33)
Rodrigo Contreras (COL)	2 June 1994 (aged 24)
Magnus Cort Nielsen (DEN)	16 January 1993 (aged 25)
Laurens De Vreese (BEL)	29 September 1988 (aged 30)
Daniil Fominykh (KAZ)	28 August 1991 (aged 27)
Omar Fraile (ESP)	17 July 1990 (aged 28)
Jakob Fuglsang (DEN)	22 March 1985 (aged 33)
Yevgeniy Gidich (KAZ)	19 May 1996 (aged 22)
Jonas Gregaard (DEN)	30 July 1996 (aged 22)
Dmitriy Gruzdev (KAZ)	13 March 1986 (aged 32)

Rider	Date of birth
Jan Hirt (CZE)	21 January 1991 (aged 27)
Hugo Houle (CAN)	27 September 1990 (aged 28)
Gorka Izagirre (ESP)	7 October 1987 (aged 31)
Ion Izagirre (ESP)	4 February 1989 (aged 29)
Merhawi Kudus (ERI)	23 January 1994 (aged 24)
Miguel Ángel López (COL)	4 February 1994 (aged 24)
Alexey Lutsenko (KAZ)	7 September 1992 (aged 26)
Yuriy Natarov (KAZ)	28 December 1996 (aged 22)
Vadim Pronskiy (KAZ)	4 June 1998 (aged 20)
Luis León Sánchez (ESP)	24 November 1983 (aged 35)
Nikita Stalnov (KAZ)	14 September 1991 (aged 27)
Davide Villella (ITA)	27 June 1991 (aged 27)
Artyom Zakharov (KAZ)	27 October 1991 (aged 27)
Andrey Zeits (KAZ)	14 December 1986 (aged 32)

=== Bahrain–Merida ===
Rider	Date of birth
Valerio Agnoli (ITA)	6 January 1985 (aged 33)
Yukiya Arashiro (JPN)	22 September 1984 (aged 34)
Phil Bauhaus (GER)	8 July 1994 (aged 24)
Grega Bole (SLO)	13 August 1985 (aged 33)
Damiano Caruso (ITA)	12 October 1987 (aged 31)
Sonny Colbrelli (ITA)	17 May 1990 (aged 28)
Chun Kai Feng (TPE)	2 November 1988 (aged 30)
Iván García Cortina (ESP)	20 November 1995 (aged 23)
Andrea Garosio (ITA)	6 December 1993 (aged 25)
Heinrich Haussler (AUS)	25 February 1984 (aged 34)
Kristijan Koren (SLO)	25 November 1986 (aged 32)
Matej Mohorič (SLO)	19 October 1994 (aged 24)

Rider	Date of birth
Antonio Nibali (ITA)	23 September 1992 (aged 26)
Vincenzo Nibali (ITA)	14 November 1984 (aged 34)
Domen Novak (SLO)	12 July 1995 (aged 23)
Mark Padun (UKR)	6 July 1996 (aged 22)
Hermann Pernsteiner (AUT)	7 August 1990 (aged 28)
Luka Pibernik (SLO)	23 October 1993 (aged 25)
Domenico Pozzovivo (ITA)	30 November 1982 (aged 36)
Marcel Sieberg (GER)	30 April 1982 (aged 36)
Dylan Teuns (BEL)	1 March 1992 (aged 26)
Jan Tratnik (SLO)	23 February 1990 (aged 28)
Meiyin Wang (CHN)	26 December 1988 (aged 30)
Stephen Williams (GBR)	9 June 1996 (aged 22)

=== Bora–Hansgrohe ===
Rider	Date of birth
Pascal Ackermann (GER)	17 January 1994 (aged 24)
Shane Archbold (NZL)	2 February 1989 (aged 29)
Erik Baška (SVK)	12 January 1994 (aged 24)
Cesare Benedetti (ITA)	3 August 1987 (aged 31)
Sam Bennett (IRL)	16 October 1990 (aged 28)
Maciej Bodnar (POL)	7 March 1985 (aged 33)
Emanuel Buchmann (GER)	18 November 1992 (aged 26)
Marcus Burghardt (GER)	30 June 1983 (aged 35)
Jean-Pierre Drucker (LUX)	3 September 1986 (aged 32)
Davide Formolo (ITA)	25 October 1992 (aged 26)
Oscar Gatto (ITA)	1 January 1985 (aged 34)
Felix Grossschartner (AUT)	23 December 1993 (aged 25)
Leopold König (CZE)	15 November 1987 (aged 31)
Patrick Konrad (AUT)	13 October 1991 (aged 27)

Rider	Date of birth
Rafał Majka (POL)	12 September 1989 (aged 29)
Jay McCarthy (AUS)	8 September 1992 (aged 26)
Gregor Mühlberger (AUT)	4 April 1994 (aged 24)
Daniel Oss (ITA)	13 January 1987 (aged 31)
Christoph Pfingsten (GER)	20 November 1987 (aged 31)
Paweł Poljański (POL)	6 May 1990 (aged 28)
Lukas Pöstlberger (AUT)	10 January 1992 (aged 26)
Juraj Sagan (SVK)	23 December 1988 (aged 30)
Peter Sagan (SVK)	26 January 1990 (aged 28)
Maximilian Schachmann (GER)	9 January 1994 (aged 24)
Andreas Schillinger (GER)	13 July 1983 (aged 35)
Michael Schwarzmann (GER)	7 January 1991 (aged 27)
Rüdiger Selig (GER)	19 February 1989 (aged 29)

=== CCC Team ===
Rider	Date of birth
Amaro Antunes (POR)	27 November 1990 (aged 28)
William Barta (USA)	4 January 1996 (aged 22)
Paweł Bernas (POL)	24 May 1990 (aged 28)
Patrick Bevin (NZL)	15 February 1991 (aged 27)
Josef Černý (CZE)	11 May 1993 (aged 25)
Víctor de la Parte (ESP)	22 June 1986 (aged 32)
Alessandro De Marchi (ITA)	19 May 1986 (aged 32)
Simon Geschke (GER)	13 March 1986 (aged 32)
Kamil Gradek (POL)	17 September 1990 (aged 28)
Jonas Koch (GER)	25 June 1993 (aged 25)
Jakub Mareczko (ITA)	30 April 1994 (aged 24)
Łukasz Owsian (POL)	24 February 1990 (aged 28)

Rider	Date of birth
Serge Pauwels (BEL)	21 November 1983 (aged 35)
Joseph Rosskopf (USA)	5 September 1989 (aged 29)
Szymon Sajnok (POL)	24 August 1997 (aged 21)
Michael Schär (SUI)	29 September 1986 (aged 32)
Laurens ten Dam (NED)	13 November 1980 (aged 38)
Greg Van Avermaet (BEL)	17 May 1985 (aged 33)
Gijs Van Hoecke (BEL)	12 November 1991 (aged 27)
Nathan Van Hooydonck (BEL)	12 October 1995 (aged 23)
Guillaume Van Keirsbulck (BEL)	14 February 1991 (aged 27)
Francisco Ventoso (ESP)	6 May 1982 (aged 36)
Łukasz Wiśniowski (POL)	7 December 1991 (aged 27)
Fred Wright (GBR)	13 June 1999 (aged 19)
Georg Zimmermann (GER)	11 October 1997 (aged 21)
Riccardo Zoidl (AUT)	8 April 1988 (aged 30)

=== Deceuninck–Quick-Step ===
Rider	Date of birth
Julian Alaphilippe (FRA)	11 June 1992 (aged 26)
Kasper Asgreen (DEN)	8 February 1995 (aged 23)
Eros Capecchi (ITA)	13 June 1986 (aged 32)
Rémi Cavagna (FRA)	10 August 1995 (aged 23)
Tim Declercq (BEL)	21 March 1989 (aged 29)
Dries Devenyns (BEL)	22 July 1983 (aged 35)
Remco Evenepoel (BEL)	25 January 2000 (aged 18)
Samuel Gaze (NZL)	12 December 1995 (aged 23)
Philippe Gilbert (BEL)	5 July 1982 (aged 36)
Álvaro Hodeg (COL)	16 September 1996 (aged 22)
Mikkel Frølich Honoré (DEN)	21 January 1997 (aged 21)
Fabio Jakobsen (NED)	31 August 1996 (aged 22)
Bob Jungels (LUX)	22 September 1992 (aged 26)
Iljo Keisse (BEL)	21 December 1982 (aged 36)

Rider	Date of birth
James Knox (GBR)	4 November 1995 (aged 23)
Yves Lampaert (BEL)	10 April 1991 (aged 27)
Davide Martinelli (ITA)	31 May 1993 (aged 25)
Enric Mas (ESP)	7 January 1995 (aged 23)
Michael Mørkøv (DEN)	30 April 1985 (aged 33)
Maximiliano Ariel Richeze (ARG)	7 March 1983 (aged 35)
Fabio Sabatini (ITA)	18 February 1985 (aged 33)
Florian Sénéchal (FRA)	10 July 1993 (aged 25)
Pieter Serry (BEL)	21 November 1988 (aged 30)
Jannik Steimle (GER)	4 April 1996 (aged 22)
Zdeněk Štybar (CZE)	11 December 1985 (aged 33)
Petr Vakoč (CZE)	11 July 1992 (aged 26)
Elia Viviani (ITA)	7 February 1989 (aged 29)

=== EF Education First ===
Rider	Date of birth
Sean Bennett (USA)	31 March 1996 (aged 22)
Alberto Bettiol (ITA)	29 October 1993 (aged 25)
Matti Breschel (DEN)	31 August 1984 (aged 34)
Nathan Brown (USA)	7 July 1991 (aged 27)
Jonathan Caicedo (ECU)	28 April 1993 (aged 25)
Hugh Carthy (GBR)	9 July 1994 (aged 24)
Simon Clarke (AUS)	18 July 1986 (aged 32)
Lawson Craddock (USA)	20 February 1992 (aged 26)
Mitchell Docker (AUS)	2 October 1986 (aged 32)
Joseph Dombrowski (USA)	12 May 1991 (aged 27)
Sergio Higuita (COL)	8 January 1997 (aged 21)
Moreno Hofland (NED)	31 August 1991 (aged 27)
Alex Howes (USA)	1 January 1988 (aged 31)
Tanel Kangert (EST)	11 March 1987 (aged 31)
Sebastian Langeveld (NED)	17 January 1985 (aged 33)

Rider	Date of birth
Daniel Martínez (COL)	25 April 1996 (aged 22)
Daniel McLay (GBR)	3 January 1992 (aged 26)
Sacha Modolo (ITA)	19 June 1987 (aged 31)
Lachlan Morton (AUS)	2 January 1992 (aged 26)
Logan Owen (USA)	25 March 1995 (aged 23)
Taylor Phinney (USA)	27 June 1990 (aged 28)
Tom Scully (NZL)	14 January 1990 (aged 28)
Rigoberto Urán (COL)	26 January 1987 (aged 31)
Julius Van den Berg (NED)	23 October 1996 (aged 22)
Tejay van Garderen (USA)	12 August 1988 (aged 30)
Sep Vanmarcke (BEL)	28 July 1988 (aged 30)
Luis Villalobos (MEX)	26 June 1998 (aged 20)
Matthew Walls (GBR)	20 April 1998 (aged 20)
James Whelan (AUS)	11 July 1996 (aged 22)
Michael Woods (CAN)	12 October 1986 (aged 32)

=== Groupama–FDJ ===
Rider	Date of birth
Bruno Armirail (FRA)	11 April 1994 (aged 24)
William Bonnet (FRA)	25 June 1982 (aged 36)
Alexys Brunel (FRA)	10 October 1998 (aged 20)
Mickaël Delage (FRA)	6 August 1985 (aged 33)
Arnaud Démare (FRA)	26 August 1991 (aged 27)
Antoine Duchesne (CAN)	12 September 1991 (aged 27)
Kilian Frankiny (SUI)	26 January 1994 (aged 24)
David Gaudu (FRA)	10 October 1996 (aged 22)
Kevin Geniets (LUX)	9 January 1997 (aged 21)
Jacopo Guarnieri (ITA)	14 August 1987 (aged 31)
Daniel Hoelgaard (NOR)	1 July 1993 (aged 25)
Žiga Jerman (SLO)	26 June 1998 (aged 20)
Ignatas Konovalovas (LTU)	8 December 1985 (aged 33)
Stefan Küng (SUI)	16 November 1993 (aged 25)
Mathieu Ladagnous (FRA)	12 December 1984 (aged 34)
Olivier Le Gac (FRA)	27 August 1993 (aged 25)

Rider	Date of birth
Matis Louvel (FRA)	19 July 1999 (aged 19)
Tobias Ludvigsson (SWE)	22 February 1991 (aged 27)
Valentin Madouas (FRA)	12 July 1996 (aged 22)
Rudy Molard (FRA)	17 September 1989 (aged 29)
Steve Morabito (SUI)	30 January 1983 (aged 35)
Thibaut Pinot (FRA)	29 May 1990 (aged 28)
Sébastien Reichenbach (SUI)	28 May 1989 (aged 29)
Anthony Roux (FRA)	18 April 1987 (aged 31)
Marc Sarreau (FRA)	10 June 1993 (aged 25)
Miles Scotson (AUS)	18 January 1994 (aged 24)
Romain Seigle (FRA)	11 October 1994 (aged 24)
Ramon Sinkeldam (NED)	9 February 1989 (aged 29)
Benjamin Thomas (FRA)	12 September 1995 (aged 23)
Benoît Vaugrenard (FRA)	5 January 1982 (aged 36)
Léo Vincent (FRA)	6 November 1995 (aged 23)

=== Lotto–Soudal ===
Rider	Date of birth
Sander Armée (BEL)	10 December 1985 (aged 33)
Tiesj Benoot (BEL)	11 March 1994 (aged 24)
Adam Blythe (GBR)	1 October 1989 (aged 29)
Victor Campenaerts (BEL)	28 October 1991 (aged 27)
Jasper De Buyst (BEL)	24 November 1993 (aged 25)
Thomas De Gendt (BEL)	6 November 1986 (aged 32)
Stan Dewulf (BEL)	20 December 1997 (aged 21)
Caleb Ewan (AUS)	11 July 1994 (aged 24)
Frederik Frison (BEL)	28 July 1992 (aged 26)
Carl Fredrik Hagen (NOR)	29 September 1991 (aged 27)
Adam Hansen (AUS)	11 May 1981 (aged 37)
Rasmus Byriel Iversen (DEN)	16 September 1997 (aged 21)
Jens Keukeleire (BEL)	23 November 1988 (aged 30)
Roger Kluge (GER)	5 February 1986 (aged 32)

Rider	Date of birth
Nikolas Maes (BEL)	9 April 1986 (aged 32)
Tomasz Marczyński (POL)	6 March 1984 (aged 34)
Remy Mertz (BEL)	17 July 1995 (aged 23)
Maxime Monfort (BEL)	14 January 1983 (aged 35)
Lawrence Naesen (BEL)	28 August 1992 (aged 26)
Gerben Thijssen (BEL)	21 June 1998 (aged 20)
Tosh Van der Sande (BEL)	28 November 1990 (aged 28)
Brian Van Goethem (NED)	16 April 1991 (aged 27)
Brent Van Moer (BEL)	12 January 1998 (aged 20)
Jelle Vanendert (BEL)	19 February 1985 (aged 33)
Harm Vanhoucke (BEL)	17 June 1997 (aged 21)
Jelle Wallays (BEL)	11 May 1989 (aged 29)
Tim Wellens (BEL)	10 May 1991 (aged 27)
Enzo Wouters (BEL)	21 March 1996 (aged 22)

=== Mitchelton–Scott ===
Rider	Date of birth
Edoardo Affini (ITA)	24 June 1996 (aged 22)
Michael Albasini (SUI)	20 December 1980 (aged 38)
Jack Bauer (NZL)	7 April 1985 (aged 33)
Sam Bewley (NZL)	22 July 1987 (aged 31)
Brent Bookwalter (USA)	16 February 1984 (aged 34)
Esteban Chaves (COL)	17 January 1990 (aged 28)
Luke Durbridge (AUS)	9 April 1991 (aged 27)
Alexander Edmondson (AUS)	22 December 1993 (aged 25)
James Fouché (NZL)	28 March 1998 (aged 20)
Tsgabu Grmay (ETH)	25 August 1991 (aged 27)
Kaden Groves (AUS)	23 December 1998 (aged 20)
Jack Haig (AUS)	6 September 1993 (aged 25)
Lucas Hamilton (AUS)	12 February 1996 (aged 22)
Michael Hepburn (AUS)	17 August 1991 (aged 27)

Rider	Date of birth
Damien Howson (AUS)	13 August 1992 (aged 26)
Daryl Impey (RSA)	6 December 1984 (aged 34)
Christopher Juul Jensen (DEN)	6 July 1989 (aged 29)
Cameron Meyer (AUS)	11 January 1988 (aged 30)
Luka Mezgec (SLO)	27 June 1988 (aged 30)
Mikel Nieve (ESP)	26 May 1984 (aged 34)
Barnabás Peák (HUN)	29 November 1998 (aged 20)
Nicholas Schultz (AUS)	13 September 1994 (aged 24)
Callum Scotson (AUS)	10 August 1996 (aged 22)
Dion Smith (NZL)	3 March 1993 (aged 25)
Robert Stannard (AUS)	16 September 1998 (aged 20)
Matteo Trentin (ITA)	2 August 1989 (aged 29)
Adam Yates (GBR)	7 August 1992 (aged 26)
Simon Yates (GBR)	7 August 1992 (aged 26)

=== Movistar Team ===
Rider	Date of birth
Andrey Amador (CRC)	29 August 1986 (aged 32)
Winner Anacona (COL)	11 August 1988 (aged 30)
Jorge Arcas (ESP)	8 July 1992 (aged 26)
Carlos Barbero (ESP)	29 April 1991 (aged 27)
Daniele Bennati (ITA)	24 September 1980 (aged 38)
Carlos Betancur (COL)	13 October 1989 (aged 29)
Richard Carapaz (ECU)	29 May 1993 (aged 25)
Héctor Carretero (ESP)	28 May 1995 (aged 23)
Jaime Castrillo (ESP)	13 March 1996 (aged 22)
Imanol Erviti (ESP)	15 November 1983 (aged 35)
Ruben Fernández (ESP)	1 March 1991 (aged 27)
Mikel Landa (ESP)	13 December 1989 (aged 29)
Luis Guillermo Mas Bonet (ESP)	15 October 1989 (aged 29)

Rider	Date of birth
Nelson Oliveira (POR)	6 March 1989 (aged 29)
Antonio Pedrero (ESP)	23 October 1991 (aged 27)
Eduard Prades (ESP)	9 August 1987 (aged 31)
Nairo Quintana (COL)	4 February 1990 (aged 28)
Jürgen Roelandts (BEL)	2 July 1985 (aged 33)
José Rojas (ESP)	8 June 1985 (aged 33)
Eduardo Sepúlveda (ARG)	13 June 1991 (aged 27)
Marc Soler (ESP)	22 November 1993 (aged 25)
Jasha Sütterlin (GER)	4 November 1992 (aged 26)
Rafael Valls (ESP)	25 June 1987 (aged 31)
Alejandro Valverde (ESP)	25 April 1980 (aged 38)
Carlos Verona (ESP)	11 April 1992 (aged 26)

=== Team Dimension Data ===
Rider	Date of birth
Lars Ytting Bak (DEN)	16 January 1980 (aged 38)
Edvald Boasson Hagen (NOR)	17 May 1987 (aged 31)
Mark Cavendish (GBR)	21 May 1985 (aged 33)
Stephen Cummings (GBR)	19 March 1981 (aged 37)
Scott Davies (GBR)	5 August 1995 (aged 23)
Stefan De Bod (RSA)	17 November 1996 (aged 22)
Nicholas Dlamini (RSA)	12 August 1995 (aged 23)
Bernhard Eisel (AUT)	17 February 1981 (aged 37)
Enrico Gasparotto (ITA)	22 March 1982 (aged 36)
Amanuel Gebreigzabhier (ERI)	17 August 1994 (aged 24)
Ryan Gibbons (RSA)	13 August 1994 (aged 24)
Jacques Janse van Rensburg (RSA)	6 September 1987 (aged 31)
Reinardt Janse van Rensburg (RSA)	3 February 1989 (aged 29)
Benjamin King (USA)	22 March 1989 (aged 29)

Rider	Date of birth
Alexander Konychev (ITA)	25 July 1998 (aged 20)
Roman Kreuziger (CZE)	6 May 1986 (aged 32)
Gino Mäder (SUI)	4 January 1997 (aged 21)
Louis Meintjes (RSA)	21 February 1992 (aged 26)
Giacomo Nizzolo (ITA)	30 January 1989 (aged 29)
Ben O'Connor (AUS)	25 November 1995 (aged 23)
Mark Renshaw (AUS)	22 October 1982 (aged 36)
Tom-Jelte Slagter (NED)	1 July 1989 (aged 29)
Jay Robert Thomson (RSA)	12 April 1986 (aged 32)
Rasmus Fossum Tiller (NOR)	8 July 1996 (aged 22)
Michael Valgren (DEN)	7 February 1992 (aged 26)
Jaco Venter (RSA)	13 February 1987 (aged 31)
Julien Vermote (BEL)	26 July 1989 (aged 29)
Danilo Wyss (SUI)	26 August 1985 (aged 33)

=== Team Jumbo–Visma ===
Rider	Date of birth
George Bennett (NZL)	7 April 1990 (aged 28)
Koen Bouwman (NED)	2 December 1993 (aged 25)
Laurens De Plus (BEL)	4 September 1995 (aged 23)
Floris De Tier (BEL)	20 January 1992 (aged 26)
Pascal Eenkhoorn (NED)	8 February 1997 (aged 21)
Robert Gesink (NED)	31 May 1986 (aged 32)
Dylan Groenewegen (NED)	21 June 1993 (aged 25)
Lennard Hofstede (NED)	29 December 1994 (aged 24)
Amund Grøndahl Jansen (NOR)	11 February 1994 (aged 24)
Steven Kruijswijk (NED)	7 June 1987 (aged 31)
Stef Krul (NED)	15 July 1995 (aged 23)
Sepp Kuss (USA)	13 September 1994 (aged 24)
Thomas Leezer (NED)	26 December 1985 (aged 33)
Bert-Jan Lindeman (NED)	16 June 1989 (aged 29)

Rider	Date of birth
Paul Martens (GER)	26 October 1983 (aged 35)
Tony Martin (GER)	23 April 1985 (aged 33)
Neilson Powless (USA)	3 September 1996 (aged 22)
Primož Roglič (SLO)	29 October 1989 (aged 29)
Timo Roosen (NED)	11 January 1993 (aged 25)
Mike Teunissen (NED)	25 August 1992 (aged 26)
Antwan Tolhoek (NED)	29 April 1994 (aged 24)
Wout Van Aert (BEL)	15 September 1994 (aged 24)
Taco Van der Hoorn (NED)	4 December 1993 (aged 25)
Jos van Emden (NED)	18 February 1985 (aged 33)
Danny van Poppel (NED)	26 July 1993 (aged 25)
Jonas Vingegaard (DEN)	10 December 1996 (aged 22)
Maarten Wynants (BEL)	13 May 1982 (aged 36)

=== Team Katusha–Alpecin ===
Rider	Date of birth
Enrico Battaglin (ITA)	17 November 1989 (aged 29)
Jenthe Biermans (BEL)	30 October 1995 (aged 23)
Ian Boswell (USA)	7 February 1991 (aged 27)
Dylan Bouwmans (NED)	16 January 1997 (aged 21)
Steff Cras (BEL)	13 February 1996 (aged 22)
Jens Debusschere (BEL)	28 August 1989 (aged 29)
Alex Dowsett (GBR)	3 October 1988 (aged 30)
Matteo Fabbro (ITA)	10 April 1995 (aged 23)
José Gonçalves (POR)	13 February 1989 (aged 29)
Ruben Guerreiro (POR)	6 July 1994 (aged 24)
Nathan Haas (AUS)	12 March 1989 (aged 29)
Marco Haller (AUT)	1 April 1991 (aged 27)
Reto Hollenstein (SUI)	22 August 1985 (aged 33)

Rider	Date of birth
Juri Hollmann (GER)	30 August 1999 (aged 19)
Pavel Kochetkov (RUS)	7 March 1986 (aged 32)
Viacheslav Kuznetsov (RUS)	24 June 1989 (aged 29)
Daniel Navarro (ESP)	18 July 1983 (aged 35)
Nils Politt (GER)	6 March 1994 (aged 24)
Willie Smit (RSA)	29 December 1992 (aged 26)
Simon Špilak (SLO)	23 June 1986 (aged 32)
Dmitrii Strakhov (RUS)	17 May 1995 (aged 23)
Harry Tanfield (GBR)	17 November 1994 (aged 24)
Mads Würtz Schmidt (DEN)	31 March 1994 (aged 24)
Rick Zabel (GER)	7 December 1993 (aged 25)
Ilnur Zakarin (RUS)	15 September 1989 (aged 29)

=== Team Ineos ===
Rider	Date of birth
Leonardo Basso (ITA)	25 December 1993 (aged 25)
Egan Bernal (COL)	13 January 1997 (aged 21)
Jonathan Castroviejo (ESP)	27 April 1987 (aged 31)
David De La Cruz (ESP)	6 May 1989 (aged 29)
Owain Doull (GBR)	2 May 1993 (aged 25)
Edward Dunbar (IRL)	1 September 1996 (aged 22)
Kenny Elissonde (FRA)	22 July 1991 (aged 27)
Chris Froome (GBR)	20 May 1985 (aged 33)
Filippo Ganna (ITA)	25 July 1996 (aged 22)
Tao Geoghegan Hart (GBR)	30 March 1995 (aged 23)
Michał Gołaś (POL)	29 April 1984 (aged 34)
Kristoffer Halvorsen (NOR)	13 April 1996 (aged 22)
Sebastián Henao (COL)	5 August 1993 (aged 25)
Vasil Kiryienka (BLR)	28 June 1981 (aged 37)
Christian Knees (GER)	5 March 1981 (aged 37)

Rider	Date of birth
Michał Kwiatkowski (POL)	2 June 1990 (aged 28)
Christopher Lawless (GBR)	4 November 1995 (aged 23)
Gianni Moscon (ITA)	20 April 1994 (aged 24)
Jhonatan Narváez (ECU)	4 March 1997 (aged 21)
Wout Poels (NED)	1 October 1987 (aged 31)
Salvatore Puccio (ITA)	31 August 1989 (aged 29)
Diego Rosa (ITA)	27 March 1989 (aged 29)
Luke Rowe (GBR)	10 March 1990 (aged 28)
Pavel Sivakov (RUS)	11 July 1997 (aged 21)
Iván Sosa (COL)	31 October 1997 (aged 21)
Ian Stannard (GBR)	25 May 1987 (aged 31)
Ben Swift (GBR)	5 November 1987 (aged 31)
Geraint Thomas (GBR)	25 May 1986 (aged 32)
Dylan van Baarle (NED)	21 May 1992 (aged 26)

=== Team Sunweb ===
Rider	Date of birth
Nikias Arndt (GER)	18 November 1991 (aged 27)
Jan Bakelants (BEL)	14 February 1986 (aged 32)
Cees Bol (NED)	27 July 1995 (aged 23)
Roy Curvers (NED)	27 December 1979 (aged 39)
Tom Dumoulin (NED)	11 November 1990 (aged 28)
Nils Eekhoff (NED)	23 January 1998 (aged 20)
Johannes Fröhlinger (GER)	9 June 1985 (aged 33)
Chad Haga (USA)	26 August 1988 (aged 30)
Chris Hamilton (AUS)	18 May 1995 (aged 23)
Jai Hindley (AUS)	5 May 1996 (aged 22)
Marc Hirschi (SUI)	24 August 1998 (aged 20)
Lennard Kämna (GER)	9 September 1996 (aged 22)
Max Kanter (GER)	22 October 1997 (aged 21)
Wilco Kelderman (NED)	25 March 1991 (aged 27)
Marten Kooistra (NED)	18 October 1997 (aged 21)

Rider	Date of birth
Asbjørn Kragh Andersen (DEN)	9 April 1992 (aged 26)
Søren Kragh Andersen (DEN)	10 August 1994 (aged 24)
Michael Matthews (AUS)	26 September 1990 (aged 28)
Joris Nieuwenhuis (NED)	11 February 1996 (aged 22)
Sam Oomen (NED)	15 August 1995 (aged 23)
Casper Pedersen (DEN)	15 March 1996 (aged 22)
Robert Power (AUS)	11 May 1995 (aged 23)
Nicolas Roche (IRL)	3 July 1984 (aged 34)
Martin Salmon (GER)	29 October 1997 (aged 21)
Michael Storer (AUS)	28 February 1997 (aged 21)
Florian Stork (GER)	27 April 1997 (aged 21)
Martijn Tusveld (NED)	9 September 1993 (aged 25)
Louis Vervaeke (BEL)	6 October 1993 (aged 25)
Maximilian Walscheid (GER)	13 June 1993 (aged 25)

=== Trek–Segafredo ===
Rider	Date of birth
Fumiyuki Beppu (JPN)	10 April 1983 (aged 35)
Julien Bernard (FRA)	17 March 1992 (aged 26)
Gianluca Brambilla (ITA)	22 August 1987 (aged 31)
Giulio Ciccone (ITA)	20 December 1994 (aged 24)
William Clarke (AUS)	11 April 1985 (aged 33)
Nicola Conci (ITA)	5 January 1997 (aged 21)
Koen de Kort (NED)	8 September 1982 (aged 36)
Nicolas Debeaumarche (FRA)	24 February 1998 (aged 20)
John Degenkolb (GER)	7 January 1989 (aged 29)
Niklas Eg (DEN)	6 January 1995 (aged 23)
Fabio Felline (ITA)	29 March 1990 (aged 28)
Alex Frame (NZL)	18 June 1993 (aged 25)
Michael Gogl (AUT)	4 November 1993 (aged 25)
Alex Kirsch (LUX)	12 June 1992 (aged 26)

Rider	Date of birth
Juan Pedro Lopez (ESP)	31 July 1997 (aged 21)
Bauke Mollema (NED)	26 November 1986 (aged 32)
Jacopo Mosca (ITA)	29 August 1993 (aged 25)
Matteo Moschetti (ITA)	14 August 1996 (aged 22)
Ryan Mullen (IRL)	7 August 1994 (aged 24)
Mads Pedersen (DEN)	18 December 1995 (aged 23)
Richie Porte (AUS)	30 January 1985 (aged 33)
Charlie Quarterman (GBR)	9 June 1998 (aged 20)
Kiel Reijnen (USA)	1 June 1986 (aged 32)
Toms Skujiņš (LAT)	15 June 1991 (aged 27)
Peter Stetina (USA)	8 August 1987 (aged 31)
Jasper Stuyven (BEL)	17 April 1992 (aged 26)
Edward Theuns (BEL)	30 April 1991 (aged 27)

=== UAE Team Emirates ===
Rider	Date of birth
Fabio Aru (ITA)	3 July 1990 (aged 28)
Matthew Beers (RSA)	10 January 1994 (aged 24)
Tom Bohli (SUI)	17 January 1994 (aged 24)
Sven Erik Bystrøm (NOR)	21 January 1992 (aged 26)
Simone Consonni (ITA)	12 September 1994 (aged 24)
Valerio Conti (ITA)	30 March 1993 (aged 25)
Rui Costa (POR)	5 October 1986 (aged 32)
Nicolas Dalla Valle (ITA)	13 September 1997 (aged 21)
Kristijan Đurasek (CRO)	26 July 1987 (aged 31)
Roberto Ferrari (ITA)	9 March 1983 (aged 35)
Fernando Gaviria (COL)	19 August 1994 (aged 24)
Sergio Henao (COL)	10 December 1987 (aged 31)
Alexander Kristoff (NOR)	5 July 1987 (aged 31)
Vegard Stake Laengen (NOR)	7 February 1989 (aged 29)
Marco Marcato (ITA)	11 February 1984 (aged 34)
Daniel Martin (IRL)	20 August 1986 (aged 32)

Rider	Date of birth
Yousif Mirza (UAE)	8 October 1988 (aged 30)
Juan Sebastián Molano (COL)	4 November 1994 (aged 24)
Manuele Mori (ITA)	9 August 1980 (aged 38)
Cristian Camilo Muñoz (COL)	20 March 1996 (aged 22)
Ivo Oliveira (POR)	5 September 1996 (aged 22)
Rui Oliveira (POR)	5 September 1996 (aged 22)
Simone Petilli (ITA)	4 May 1993 (aged 25)
Jasper Philipsen (BEL)	2 March 1998 (aged 20)
Tadej Pogačar (SLO)	21 September 1998 (aged 20)
Jan Polanc (SLO)	6 May 1992 (aged 26)
Edward Ravasi (ITA)	5 June 1994 (aged 24)
Alexandr Riabushenko (BLR)	12 October 1995 (aged 23)
Rory Sutherland (AUS)	8 February 1982 (aged 36)
Oliviero Troia (ITA)	1 September 1994 (aged 24)
Diego Ulissi (ITA)	15 July 1989 (aged 29)

== Notes ==
Preceded by 2018	List of UCI WorldTeams and riders 2019	Succeeded by 2020
