= 2019 CCC Team season =

Cycling team season

CCC Team
- 2019 season
- UCI code: CPT
- Status: UCI WorldTeam
- Manager: Jim Ochowicz
- Main sponsor(s): CCC
- Based: Poland
- Groupset: Shimano

Season victories
- Stage race stages: 3
- National Championships: 1

The 2019 season for the CCC Pro Team began in January with the Tour Down Under. As a UCI WorldTeam, they were automatically invited and obligated to send a squad to every event in the UCI World Tour.

== Team roster ==
As of 4 October 2019.

Rider	Date of birth
Amaro Antunes (POR)	27 November 1990 (aged 28)
Will Barta (USA)	4 January 1996 (aged 23)
Paweł Bernas (POL)	24 May 1990 (aged 29)
Patrick Bevin (NZL)	15 February 1991 (aged 28)
Josef Černý (CZE)	11 May 1993 (aged 26)
Víctor de la Parte (ESP)	22 June 1986 (aged 33)
Alessandro De Marchi (ITA)	19 May 1986 (aged 33)
Simon Geschke (GER)	13 March 1986 (aged 33)
Kamil Gradek (POL)	17 September 1990 (aged 29)
Jonas Koch (GER)	25 June 1993 (aged 26)
Jakub Mareczko (ITA)	30 April 1994 (aged 25)
Łukasz Owsian (POL)	24 February 1990 (aged 29)

Rider	Date of birth
Serge Pauwels (BEL)	21 November 1983 (aged 35)
Joey Rosskopf (USA)	5 September 1989 (aged 30)
Szymon Sajnok (POL)	24 August 1997 (aged 22)
Michael Schär (SUI)	29 September 1986 (aged 33)
Laurens ten Dam (NED)	13 November 1980 (aged 38)
Greg Van Avermaet (BEL)	17 May 1985 (aged 34)
Gijs Van Hoecke (BEL)	12 November 1991 (aged 27)
Nathan Van Hooydonck (BEL)	12 October 1995 (aged 23)
Guillaume Van Keirsbulck (BEL)	14 February 1991 (aged 28)
Francisco Ventoso (ESP)	6 May 1982 (aged 37)
Łukasz Wiśniowski (POL)	7 December 1991 (aged 27)
Riccardo Zoidl (AUT)	8 April 1988 (aged 31)

Riders who joined the team for the 2019 season

Rider	2018 team
Amaro Antunes	CCC–Sprandi–Polkowice
Will Barta	Hagens Berman Axeon
Paweł Bernas	CCC–Sprandi–Polkowice
Josef Černý	Elkov–Author
Laurens ten Dam	Team Sunweb
Kamil Gradek	CCC–Sprandi–Polkowice
Simon Geschke	Team Sunweb
Jonas Koch	CCC–Sprandi–Polkowice
Jakub Mareczko	Wilier Triestina–Selle Italia
Łukasz Owsian	CCC–Sprandi–Polkowice
Víctor de la Parte	Movistar Team
Serge Pauwels	Team Dimension Data
Szymon Sajnok	CCC–Sprandi–Polkowice
Guillaume Van Keirsbulck	Wanty–Groupe Gobert
Gijs Van Hoecke	LottoNL–Jumbo
Łukasz Wiśniowski	Team Sky
Riccardo Zoidl	Team Felbermayr–Simplon Wels

Riders who left the team during or after the 2018 season

Rider	2019 team
Alberto Bettiol	EF Education First
Tom Bohli	UAE Team Emirates
Brent Bookwalter	Mitchelton–BikeExchange
Damiano Caruso	Bahrain–Merida
Rohan Dennis	Bahrain–Merida
Jempy Drucker	Bora–Hansgrohe
Kilian Frankiny	Groupama–FDJ
Simon Gerrans	Retired
Stefan Küng	Groupama–FDJ
Richie Porte	Trek–Segafredo
Nicolas Roche	Team Sunweb
Jürgen Roelandts	Movistar Team
Miles Scotson	Groupama–FDJ
Dylan Teuns	Bahrain–Merida
Tejay van Garderen	EF Education First
Loïc Vliegen	Wanty–Gobert
Danilo Wyss	Team Dimension Data

== Season victories ==
Date	Race	Competition	Rider	Country	Location
16 January	Tour Down Under, Stage 2	UCI World Tour	Patrick Bevin (NZL)	Australia	Angaston
20 January	Tour Down Under, Points classification	UCI World Tour	Patrick Bevin (NZL)	Australia	
8 February	Volta a la Comunitat Valenciana, Stage 3	UCI Europe Tour	Greg Van Avermaet (BEL)	Spain	Chera
5 May	Tour de Yorkshire, Stage 4	UCI Europe Tour	Greg Van Avermaet (BEL)	United Kingdom	Leeds
26 May	Hammer Stavanger, Stage 3 (chase) (TTT)	UCI Europe Tour	(Note: The winning riders were Serge Pauwels, Szymon Sajnok, Nathan Van Hooydonck, Guillaume Van Keirsbulck and Łukasz Wiśniowski)	Norway	Stavanger
9 August	Tour de Pologne, Mountains classification	UCI World Tour	Simon Geschke (GER)	Poland	

== National, Continental and World champions ==
Date	Discipline	Jersey	Rider	Country	Location
4 January	New Zealand National Time Trial Championships		Patrick Bevin (NZL)	New Zealand	Napier
