= 2019 Dimension Data season =

Dimension Data
- 2019 season
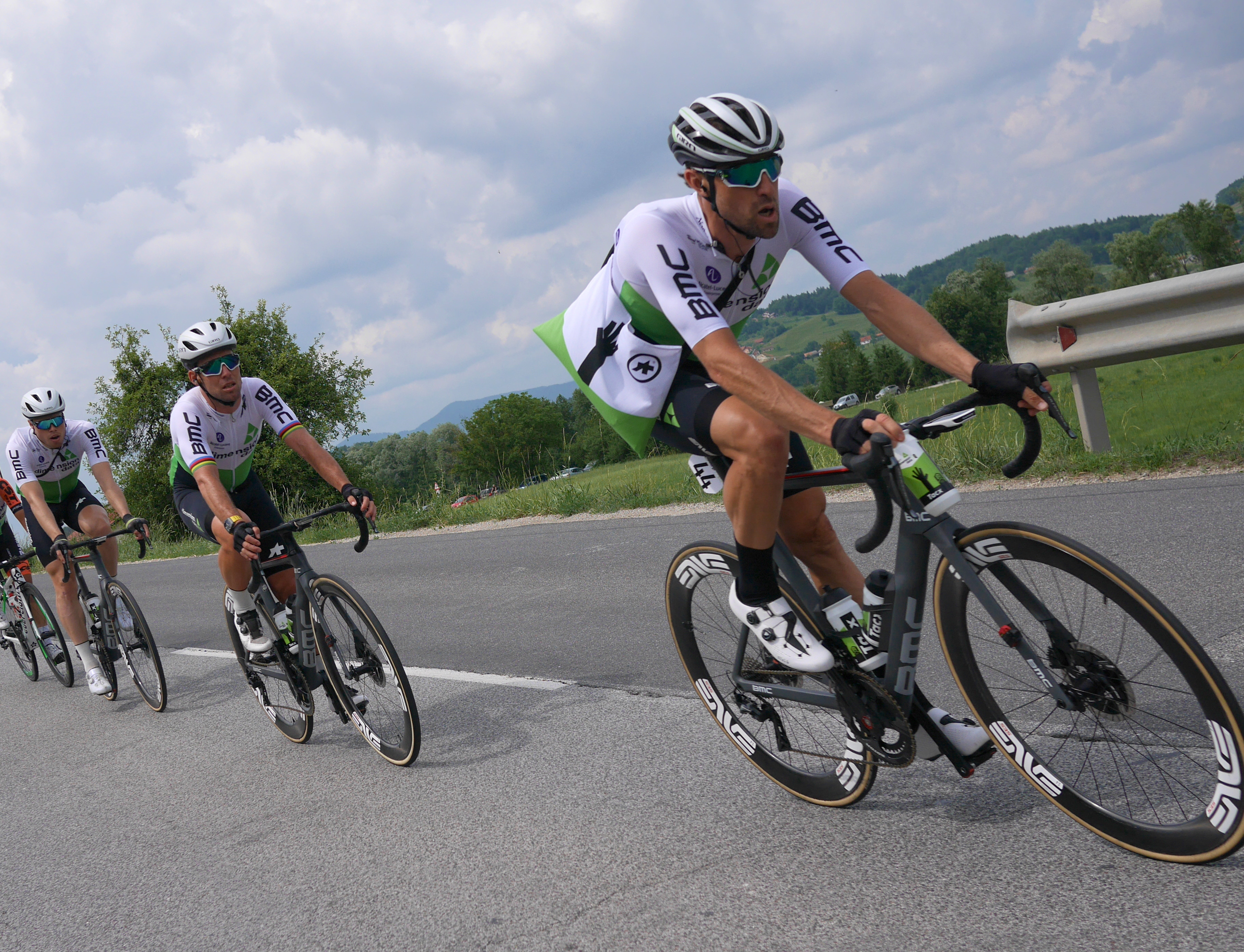
- Dimension Data in Tour of Slovenia
- UCI code: TDD
- Status: UCI WorldTeam
- Manager: Brian Smith
- Main sponsor(s): Dimension Data
- Based: South Africa
- Bicycles: Cervélo

Season victories
- Stage race stages: 4

The 2019 season for the Team Dimension Data cycling team will begin in January at the Tour Down Under. As a UCI WorldTeam, they will be automatically invited and obligated to send a squad to every event in the UCI World Tour.

== Team roster ==
As of 1 December 2018

Rider	Date of birth
Lars Ytting Bak (DEN)	16 January 1980 (aged 38)
Edvald Boasson Hagen (NOR)	17 May 1987 (aged 31)
Mark Cavendish (GBR)	21 May 1985 (aged 33)
Steve Cummings (GBR)	19 March 1981 (aged 37)
Scott Davies (GBR)	5 August 1995 (aged 23)
Stefan de Bod (RSA)	17 November 1996 (aged 22)
Nicholas Dlamini (RSA)	12 August 1995 (aged 23)
Bernhard Eisel (AUT)	17 February 1981 (aged 37)
Enrico Gasparotto (ITA)	22 March 1982 (aged 36)
Amanuel Gebrezgabihier (ERI)	17 August 1994 (aged 24)
Ryan Gibbons (RSA)	13 August 1994 (aged 24)
Jacques Janse van Rensburg (RSA)	6 September 1987 (aged 31)
Reinardt Janse van Rensburg (RSA)	3 February 1989 (aged 29)
Ben King (USA)	22 March 1989 (aged 29)

Rider	Date of birth
Roman Kreuziger (CZE)	6 May 1986 (aged 32)
Gino Mäder (SUI)	4 January 1997 (aged 21)
Louis Meintjes (RSA)	21 February 1992 (aged 26)
Giacomo Nizzolo (ITA)	30 January 1989 (aged 29)
Ben O'Connor (AUS)	25 November 1995 (aged 23)
Mark Renshaw (AUS)	22 October 1982 (aged 36)
Tom-Jelte Slagter (NED)	1 July 1989 (aged 29)
Jay Thomson (RSA)	12 April 1986 (aged 32)
Rasmus Tiller (NOR)	28 July 1996 (aged 22)
Michael Valgren (DEN)	7 February 1992 (aged 26)
Jaco Venter (RSA)	13 February 1987 (aged 31)
Julien Vermote (BEL)	26 July 1989 (aged 29)
Danilo Wyss (SUI)	26 August 1985 (aged 33)

Riders who joined the team for the 2019 season

Rider	2018 team
Lars Ytting Bak	Lotto–Soudal
Stefan de Bod	Dimension Data for Qhubeka
Enrico Gasparotto	Bahrain–Merida
Roman Kreuziger	Mitchelton–BikeExchange
Gino Mäder	-
Giacomo Nizzolo	Trek–Segafredo
Rasmus Tiller	Joker Icopal
Michael Valgren	Astana
Danilo Wyss	BMC Racing Team

Riders who left the team during or after the 2018 season

Rider	2019 team
Igor Anton	Retired
Natnael Berhane	Cofidis
Mekseb Debesay	-
Nicolas Dougall	-
Merhawi Kudus	Astana
Lachlan Morton	EF Education First
Serge Pauwels	CCC Team
Scott Thwaites	Vitus Pro Cycling
Johann van Zyl	303Project

== Season victories ==
Date	Race	Competition	Rider	Country	Location
6 February	Volta a la Comunitat Valenciana, Stage 1	UCI Europe Tour	Edvald Boasson Hagen (NOR)	Spain	Orihuela
21 February	Tour of Oman, Stage 6	UCI Asia Tour	Giacomo Nizzolo (ITA)	Oman	Matrah Corniche
30 May	Tour of Norway, Stage 3	UCI Europe Tour	Edvald Boasson Hagen (NOR)	Norway	Kristiansand
9 June	Critérium du Dauphiné, Stage 1	UCI World Tour	Edvald Boasson Hagen (NOR)	France	Jussac
23 June	Tour of Slovenia, Stage 5	UCI Europe Tour	Giacomo Nizzolo (ITA)	Slovenia	Novo Mesto
13 August	Vuelta a Burgos, Stage 1	UCI Europe Tour	Giacomo Nizzolo (ITA)	Spain	Burgos

== National, Continental and World champions 2019 ==
Date	Discipline	Jersey	Rider	Country	Location
24 June	Eritrean National Time Trial Championships		Amanuel Gebrezgabihier (ERI)	Eritrea	Asmara
