= 2019 Movistar Team season =

Movistar Team
- 2019 season
- UCI code: MOV
- Status: UCI WorldTeam
- Manager: Eusebio Unzué
- Main sponsor(s): Telefónica
- Based: Spain
- Bicycles: Canyon
- Groupset: Campagnolo

Season victories
- One-day races: 2
- Stage race overall: 4
- Stage race stages: 11
- Grand Tours: 1
- National Championships: 1
- Jersey

The 2019 season for Movistar Team began in January at the Tour Down Under. As a UCI WorldTeam, they were automatically invited and obligated to send a squad to every event in the UCI World Tour.

== Team roster ==
As of 21 December 2018.

Rider	Date of birth
Andrey Amador (CRC)	August 29, 1986 (aged 32)
Winner Anacona (COL)	August 11, 1988 (aged 30)
Jorge Arcas (ESP)	July 8, 1992 (aged 26)
Carlos Barbero (ESP)	April 29, 1991 (aged 27)
Daniele Bennati (ITA)	September 24, 1980 (aged 38)
Carlos Betancur (COL)	October 13, 1989 (aged 29)
Richard Carapaz (ECU)	May 29, 1993 (aged 25)
Héctor Carretero (ESP)	May 28, 1995 (aged 23)
Jaime Castrillo (ESP)	March 13, 1996 (aged 22)
Imanol Erviti (ESP)	November 15, 1983 (aged 35)
Rubén Fernández (ESP)	March 1, 1991 (aged 27)
Mikel Landa (ESP)	December 13, 1989 (aged 29)
Lluís Mas (ESP)	15 October 1989 (aged 29)

Rider	Date of birth
Nelson Oliveira (POR)	March 6, 1989 (aged 29)
Antonio Pedrero (ESP)	October 23, 1991 (aged 27)
Eduard Prades (ESP)	9 August 1987 (aged 31)
Nairo Quintana (COL)	February 4, 1990 (aged 28)
Jürgen Roelandts (BEL)	2 July 1985 (aged 33)
José Joaquín Rojas (ESP)	June 8, 1985 (aged 33)
Eduardo Sepúlveda (ARG)	June 13, 1991 (aged 27)
Marc Soler (ESP)	November 22, 1993 (aged 25)
Jasha Sütterlin (GER)	November 4, 1992 (aged 26)
Rafael Valls (ESP)	June 25, 1987 (aged 31)
Alejandro Valverde (ESP)	April 25, 1980 (aged 38)
Carlos Verona (ESP)	4 December 1992 (aged 26)

Riders who joined the team for the 2019 season

Rider	2018 team
Lluís Mas	Caja Rural–Seguros RGA
Eduard Prades	Euskadi–Murias
Jürgen Roelandts	BMC Racing Team
Carlos Verona	Mitchelton–BikeExchange

Riders who left the team during or after the 2018 season

Rider	2019 team
Nuno Bico	Burgos BH
Víctor de la Parte	CCC Team
Dayer Quintana	Neri Sottoli–Selle Italia–KTM
Jaime Rosón	---

== Season victories ==
Date	Race	Competition	Rider	Country	Location
1 February	Vuelta a San Juan, Stage 5	UCI America Tour	Winner Anacona (COL)	Argentina	Alto Colorado
3 February	Vuelta a San Juan, Overall	UCI America Tour	Winner Anacona (COL)	Argentina	
3 February	Vuelta a San Juan, Teams classification	UCI America Tour	(Note: The riders on the squad were Nairo Quintana, Jorge Arcas, Richard Carapaz, Winner Anacona, Eduardo Sepúlveda and Carlos Barbero)	Argentina	
15 February	Tour de la Provence, Stage 2	UCI Europe Tour	Eduard Prades (ESP)	France	La Ciotat
17 February	Tour Colombia, Stage 6	UCI America Tour	Nairo Quintana (COL)	Colombia	Alto de Las Palmas
26 February	UAE Tour, Stage 3	UCI World Tour	Alejandro Valverde (ESP)	United Arab Emirates	Jebel Hafeet
28 March	Settimana Internazionale di Coppi e Bartali, Stage 2	UCI Europe Tour	Mikel Landa (ESP)	Italy	Sogliano al Rubicone
31 March	Volta a Catalunya, Teams classification	UCI World Tour	(Note: The riders on the squad were Alejandro Valverde, Nairo Quintana, Richard Carapaz, Carlos Verona, Andrey Amador, Imanol Erviti and Marc Soler)	Spain	
14 April	Klasika Primavera	UCI Europe Tour	Carlos Betancur (COL)	Spain	Amorebieta
27 April	Vuelta a Castilla y León, Teams classification	UCI Europe Tour	(Note: The riders on the squad were Carlos Barbero, Jorge Arcas, Eduard Prades, Daniele Bennati, Rubén Fernández, Nelson Oliveira and Eduardo Sepúlveda)	Spain	
4 May	Vuelta a Asturias, Stage 2	UCI Europe Tour	Richard Carapaz (ECU)	Spain	Cangas del Narcea
5 May	Vuelta a Asturias, Overall	UCI Europe Tour	Richard Carapaz (ECU)	Spain	
5 May	Vuelta a Asturias, Points classification	UCI Europe Tour	Richard Carapaz (ECU)	Spain	
5 May	Vuelta a Asturias, Teams classification	UCI Europe Tour	(Note: The riders on the squad were Richard Carapaz, Mikel Landa, José Joaquín Rojas, Héctor Carretero, Lluís Mas and Antonio Pedrero)	Spain	
14 May	Giro d'Italia, Stage 4	UCI World Tour	Richard Carapaz (ECU)	Italy	Frascati
19 May	Vuelta a Aragón, Overall	UCI Europe Tour	Eduard Prades (ESP)	Spain	
19 May	Vuelta a Aragón, Teams classification	UCI Europe Tour	(Note: The riders on the squad were Eduardo Sepúlveda, Jorge Arcas, Eduard Prades, Jaime Castrillo, Marc Soler and Rafael Valls)	Spain	
25 May	Giro d'Italia, Stage 14	UCI World Tour	Richard Carapaz (ECU)	Italy	Courmayeur
2 June	Giro d'Italia, Overall	UCI World Tour	Richard Carapaz (ECU)	Italy	
2 June	Giro d'Italia, Teams classification	UCI World Tour	(Note: The riders on the squad were Mikel Landa, Andrey Amador, Richard Carapaz, Héctor Carretero, Lluís Mas, Antonio Pedrero, José Joaquín Rojas and Jasha Sütterlin)	Italy	
20 June	Route d'Occitanie, Stage 1	UCI Europe Tour	Alejandro Valverde (ESP)	France	Saint-Geniez-d’Olt-et-d’Aubrac
23 June	Route d'Occitanie, Overall	UCI Europe Tour	Alejandro Valverde (ESP)	France	
7 July	Tour of Austria, Stage 1	UCI Europe Tour	Carlos Barbero (ESP)	Austria	Freistadt
25 July	Prueba Villafranca-Ordiziako Klasika	UCI Europe Tour	Rafael Valls (ESP)	Spain	Ordizia
25 July	Tour de France, Stage 18	UCI World Tour	Nairo Quintana (COL)	France	Valloire
28 July	Tour de France, Teams classification	UCI World Tour	(Note: The riders on the squad were Nairo Quintana, Alejandro Valverde, Andrey Amador, Imanol Erviti, Mikel Landa, Nelson Oliveira, Marc Soler and Carlos Verona)	France	

== National, Continental and World champions 2019 ==
Date	Discipline	Jersey	Rider	Country	Location
30 June	Spanish National Road Race Champion		Alejandro Valverde (ESP)	Spain	Murcia
