= 2019 Team Sunweb (men's team) season =

Team Sunweb
- 2019 season
- UCI code: SUN
- Status: UCI WorldTeam
- World Tour Rank: 15th
- Manager: Iwan Spekenbrink
- Main sponsor(s): Sunweb
- Based: Germany
- Bicycles: Cervélo
- Groupset: Shimano

Season victories
- One-day races: 3
- Stage race stages: 6
- Most wins: Michael Matthews, (3 Wins)
- Best ranked rider: Michael Matthews, (33rd)

The 2019 season for Team Sunweb will begin in January with the Tour Down Under. As a UCI WorldTeam, they will be automatically invited and obligated to send a squad to every event in the UCI World Tour.

== Team roster ==
As of 25 November 2018.

Rider	Date of birth
Nikias Arndt (GER)	18 November 1991 (aged 27)
Jan Bakelants (BEL)	14 February 1986 (aged 32)
Cees Bol (NED)	27 July 1995 (aged 23)
Roy Curvers (NED)	27 December 1979 (aged 38)
Tom Dumoulin (NED)	11 November 1990 (aged 28)
Johannes Fröhlinger (GER)	9 June 1985 (aged 33)
Chad Haga (USA)	26 August 1988 (aged 30)
Chris Hamilton (AUS)	18 May 1995 (aged 23)
Jai Hindley (AUS)	5 May 1996 (aged 22)
Marc Hirschi (SUI)	24 August 1998 (aged 20)
Lennard Kämna (GER)	9 September 1996 (aged 22)
Max Kanter (GER)	22 October 1997 (aged 21)
Wilco Kelderman (NED)	25 March 1991 (aged 27)

Rider	Date of birth
Asbjørn Kragh Andersen (DEN)	9 April 1992 (aged 26)
Søren Kragh Andersen (DNK)	10 August 1994 (aged 24)
Michael Matthews (AUS)	26 September 1990 (aged 28)
Joris Nieuwenhuis (NED)	11 February 1996 (aged 22)
Sam Oomen (NED)	15 August 1995 (aged 23)
Casper Pedersen (DEN)	15 March 1996 (aged 22)
Robert Power (AUS)	11 May 1995 (aged 23)
Nicolas Roche (IRL)	3 July 1984 (aged 34)
Michael Storer (AUS)	28 February 1997 (aged 21)
Martijn Tusveld (NED)	9 September 1993 (aged 25)
Louis Vervaeke (BEL)	6 October 1993 (aged 25)
Max Walscheid (GER)	13 June 1993 (aged 25)

Riders who joined the team for the 2019 season

Rider	2018 team
Asbjørn Kragh Andersen	Team Waoo
Jan Bakelants	AG2R La Mondiale
Cees Bol	SEG Racing Academy
Marc Hirschi	Development Team Sunweb
Max Kanter	Development Team Sunweb
Joris Nieuwenhuis	Development Team Sunweb
Casper Pedersen	Aqua Blue Sport
Robert Power	Mitchelton–BikeExchange
Nicolas Roche	BMC Racing Team

Riders who left the team during or after the 2018 season

Rider	2019 team
Phil Bauhaus	Bahrain–Merida
Simon Geschke	CCC Team
Lennard Hofstede	Team Jumbo–Visma
Tom Stamsnijder	Retired
Laurens ten Dam	CCC Team
Mike Teunissen	Team Jumbo–Visma
Edward Theuns	Trek–Segafredo

== Season victories ==
Date	Race	Competition	Rider	Country	Location
20 January	Tour Down Under, Young rider classification	UCI World Tour	Chris Hamilton (AUS)	Australia	
19 March	Tirreno–Adriatico, Young rider classification	UCI World Tour	Sam Oomen (NED)	Italy	
20 March	Nokere Koerse	UCI Europe Tour	Cees Bol (NED)	Belgium	Nokere
26 March	Volta a Catalunya, Stage 2	UCI World Tour	Michael Matthews (AUS)	Spain	Sant Feliu de Guíxols
30 March	Volta a Catalunya, Stage 6	UCI World Tour	Michael Matthews (AUS)	Spain	Vila-seca
31 March	Volta a Catalunya, Points classification	UCI World Tour	Michael Matthews (AUS)	Spain	
18 May	Tour of California, Stage 7	UCI World Tour	Cees Bol (NED)	United States	Pasadena
28 May	Tour of Norway, Stage 1	UCI Europe Tour	Cees Bol (NED)	Norway	Egersund
2 June	Giro d'Italia, Stage 21	UCI World Tour	Chad Haga (USA)	Italy	Verona
31 August	Vuelta a España, Stage 8	UCI World Tour	Nikias Arndt (GER)	Spain	Igualada
13 September	Grand Prix Cycliste de Québec	UCI World Tour	Michael Matthews (AUS)	Canada	Québec
25 September	Omloop van het Houtland	UCI Europe Tour	Max Walscheid (GER)	Belgium	Lichtervelde

== National, Continental and World champions 2019 ==
Date	Discipline	Jersey	Rider	Country	Location
