= 2019 Mitchelton–Scott (men's team) season =

Mitchelton–Scott
- 2019 season
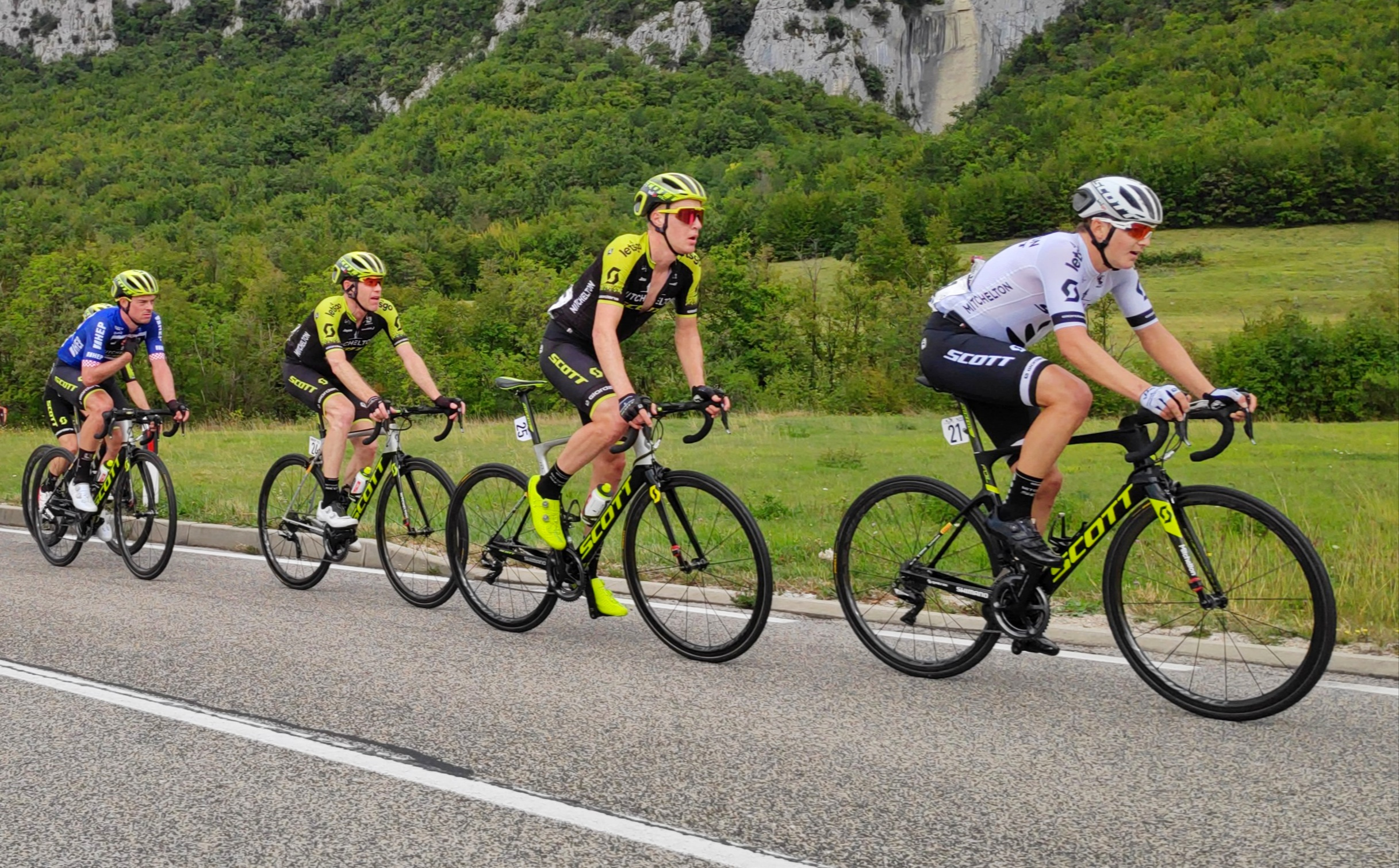
- Mitchelton-Scott in 2019 CRO Race
- UCI code: MTS
- Status: UCI WorldTeam
- Manager: Shayne Bannan
- Main sponsor(s): Orica, Scott
- Based: Australia
- Bicycles: Scott
- Groupset: Shimano

Season victories
- Stage race overall: 2
- Stage race stages: 21
- National Championships: 4

The 2019 season for the Mitchelton–Scott cycling team began in January at the Tour Down Under. As a UCI WorldTeam, they were automatically invited and obligated to send a squad to every event in the UCI World Tour.

== Team roster ==
As of 4 August 2019.

Rider	Date of birth
Edoardo Affini (ITA)	24 June 1996 (aged 23)
Michael Albasini (SUI)	20 December 1980 (aged 38)
Jack Bauer (NZL)	7 April 1985 (aged 34)
Sam Bewley (NZL)	22 July 1987 (aged 32)
Brent Bookwalter (USA)	16 February 1984 (aged 35)
Esteban Chaves (COL)	17 January 1990 (aged 29)
Luke Durbridge (AUS)	9 April 1991 (aged 28)
Alex Edmondson (AUS)	22 December 1993 (aged 25)
James Fouché (Note: Fouché joined the team on 1 August, as a stagiaire, from Team Wiggins Le Col.) (NZL)	28 March 1998 (aged 21)
Tsgabu Grmay (ETH)	25 August 1991 (aged 27)
Kaden Groves (Note: Groves joined the team on 1 August, as a stagiaire, from SEG Racing Academy.) (AUS)	23 December 1998 (aged 20)
Jack Haig (AUS)	6 September 1993 (aged 25)
Lucas Hamilton (AUS)	12 February 1996 (aged 23)
Michael Hepburn (AUS)	17 August 1991 (aged 27)

Rider	Date of birth
Damien Howson (AUS)	13 August 1992 (aged 26)
Daryl Impey (RSA)	6 December 1984 (aged 34)
Christopher Juul-Jensen (DEN)	6 July 1989 (aged 30)
Cameron Meyer (AUS)	11 January 1988 (aged 31)
Luka Mezgec (SLO)	27 June 1988 (aged 31)
Mikel Nieve (ESP)	26 May 1984 (aged 35)
Barnabás Peák (Note: Peák joined the team on 1 August, as a stagiaire, from SEG Racing Academy.) (HUN)	29 November 1998 (aged 20)
Nick Schultz (AUS)	13 September 1994 (aged 24)
Callum Scotson (AUS)	10 August 1996 (aged 22)
Dion Smith (NZL)	3 March 1993 (aged 26)
Robert Stannard (AUS)	16 September 1998 (aged 20)
Matteo Trentin (ITA)	2 August 1989 (aged 30)
Adam Yates (GBR)	7 August 1992 (aged 26)
Simon Yates (GBR)	7 August 1992 (aged 26)

Riders who joined the team for the 2019 season

Rider	2018 team
Edoardo Affini	SEG Racing Academy
Brent Bookwalter	BMC Racing Team
Tsgabu Grmay	Trek–Segafredo
Nick Schultz	Caja Rural–Seguros RGA
Callum Scotson	Mitchelton–BikeExchange
Dion Smith	Wanty–Groupe Gobert
Robert Stannard	Mitchelton–BikeExchange

Riders who left the team during or after the 2018 season

Rider	2019 team
Caleb Ewan	Lotto–Soudal
Roger Kluge	Lotto–Soudal
Roman Kreuziger	Team Dimension Data
Robert Power	Team Sunweb
Svein Tuft	Rally UHC Cycling
Carlos Verona	Movistar Team

== Season victories ==
Date	Race	Competition	Rider	Country	Location
18 January	Tour Down Under, Stage 4	UCI World Tour	Daryl Impey (RSA)	Australia	Campbelltown
20 January	Tour Down Under, Overall	UCI World Tour	Daryl Impey (RSA)	Australia	
2 February	Herald Sun Tour, Stage 4	UCI Oceania Tour	Nick Schultz (AUS)	Australia	Arthurs Seat
7 February	Volta a la Comunitat Valenciana, Stage 2	UCI Europe Tour	Matteo Trentin (ITA)	Spain	Alicante
9 February	Volta a la Comunitat Valenciana, Stage 4	UCI Europe Tour	Adam Yates (GBR)	Spain	Alcossebre
21 February	Vuelta a Andalucía, Stage 2	UCI Europe Tour	Matteo Trentin (ITA)	Spain	Torredonjimeno
23 February	Vuelta a Andalucía, Stage 4	UCI Europe Tour	Simon Yates (GBR)	Spain	Granada
24 February	Vuelta a Andalucía, Stage 5	UCI Europe Tour	Matteo Trentin (ITA)	Spain	Alhaurín de la Torre
24 February	Vuelta a Andalucía, Mountains classification	UCI Europe Tour	Simon Yates (GBR)	Spain	
13 March	Tirreno–Adriatico, Stage 1 (TTT)	UCI World Tour	(Note: The winning riders were Adam Yates, Alex Edmondson, Brent Bookwalter, Luke Durbridge, Michael Hepburn, Christopher Juul-Jensen and Damien Howson)	Italy	Lido di Camaiore
14 March	Paris–Nice, Stage 5	UCI World Tour	Simon Yates (GBR)	France	Barbentane
27 March	Volta a Catalunya, Stage 3	UCI World Tour	Adam Yates (GBR)	Spain	Vallter 2000
27 March	Settimana Internazionale di Coppi e Bartali, Stage 1b (TTT)	UCI Europe Tour	(Note: The winning riders were Lucas Hamilton, Sam Bewley, Brent Bookwalter, Damien Howson, Cameron Meyer, Nick Schultz and Robert Stannard)	Italy	Gatteo
31 March	Settimana Internazionale di Coppi e Bartali, Overall	UCI Europe Tour	Lucas Hamilton (AUS)	Italy	
31 March	Settimana Internazionale di Coppi e Bartali, Young rider classification	UCI Europe Tour	Lucas Hamilton (AUS)	Italy	
31 March	Settimana Internazionale di Coppi e Bartali, Teams classification	UCI Europe Tour	(Note: The winning riders were Lucas Hamilton, Sam Bewley, Brent Bookwalter, Damien Howson, Cameron Meyer, Nick Schultz and Robert Stannard)	Italy	
13 April	Tour of the Basque Country, Stage 6	UCI World Tour	Adam Yates (GBR)	Spain	Eibar
13 April	Tour of the Basque Country, Mountains classification	UCI World Tour	Adam Yates (GBR)	Spain	
31 May	Giro d'Italia, Stage 19	UCI World Tour	Esteban Chaves (COL)	Italy	San Martino di Castrozza
31 May	Tour of Norway, Stage 4	UCI Europe Tour	Edoardo Affini (ITA)	Norway	Sandefjord
9 June	Hammer Limburg, Stage 3 (chase) (TTT)	UCI Europe Tour	(Note: The winning riders were Edoardo Affini, Robert Stannard, Alex Edmondson, Michael Hepburn and Cameron Meyer)	Netherlands	Limburg
20 June	Tour of Slovenia, Stage 2	UCI Europe Tour	Luka Mezgec (SLO)	Slovenia	Celje
23 June	Tour of Slovenia, Points classification	UCI Europe Tour	Luka Mezgec (SLO)	Slovenia	
14 July	Tour de France, Stage 9	UCI World Tour	Daryl Impey (RSA)	France	Brioude
18 July	Tour de France, Stage 12	UCI World Tour	Simon Yates (GBR)	France	Bagnères-de-Bigorre
21 July	Tour de France, Stage 15	UCI World Tour	Simon Yates (GBR)	France	Foix
24 July	Tour de France, Stage 17	UCI World Tour	Matteo Trentin (ITA)	France	Gap, Hautes-Alpes
4 August	Tour de Pologne, Stage 2	UCI World Tour	Luka Mezgec (SLO)	Poland	Katowice
7 August	Tour de Pologne, Stage 5	UCI World Tour	Luka Mezgec (SLO)	Poland	Bielsko-Biała

== National, Continental and World champions ==
Date	Discipline	Jersey	Rider	Country	Location
4 January	Australian National Time Trial Championships		Luke Durbridge (AUS)	Australia	Buninyong
8 February	South African National Time Trial Championships		Daryl Impey (RSA)	South Africa	Tshwane
10 February	South African National Road Race Championships		Daryl Impey (RSA)	South Africa	Tshwane
27 June	Ethiopian National Time Trial Champion		Tsgabu Grmay (ETH)	Ethiopia	
