= 2019 UAE Team Emirates season =

UAE Team Emirates
- 2019 season
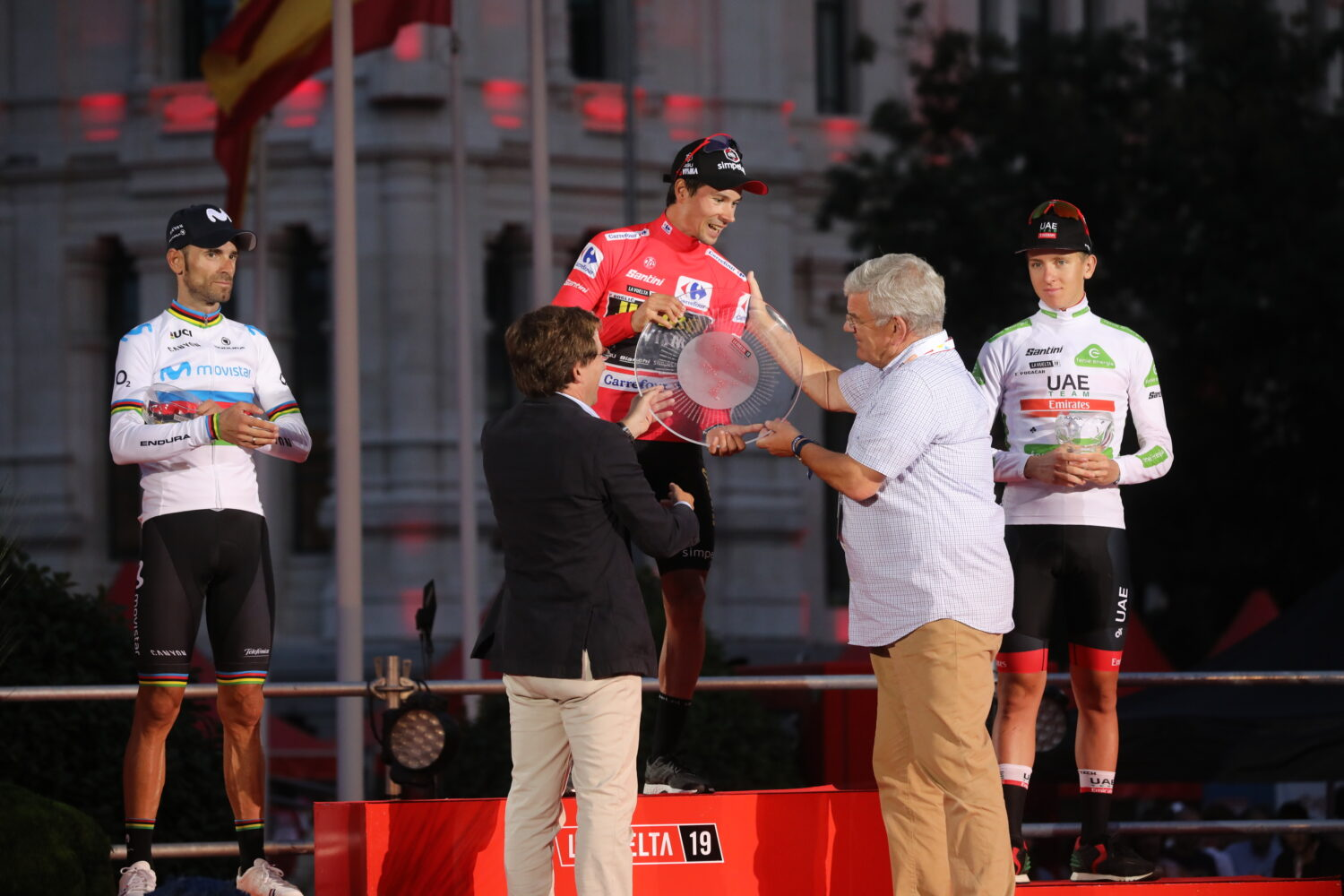
- Tadej Pogačar on Vuelta Podium (3rd place)
- UCI code: UAD
- Status: UCI WorldTeam
- World Tour Rank: 4th
- Manager: Giuseppe Saronni
- Main sponsor(s): Emirates
- Based: United Arab Emirates
- Bicycles: Colnago
- Groupset: Shimano

Season victories
- One-day races: 3
- Stage race overall: 4
- Stage race stages: 17
- National Championships: 3
- Most wins: Alexander Kristoff & Tadej Pogačar (7 Wins)
- Best ranked rider: Alexander Kristoff, (8th)
- Jersey

The 2019 season for UAE Team Emirates began in January at the Tour Down Under. As a UCI WorldTeam, they were automatically invited and obligated to send a squad to every event in the UCI World Tour.

== Team roster ==
As of 6 January 2019.

Rider	Date of birth
Fabio Aru (ITA)	3 July 1990 (age 35)
Tom Bohli (SUI)	17 January 1994 (age 32)
Sven Erik Bystrøm (NOR)	21 January 1992 (age 34)
Simone Consonni (ITA)	12 September 1994 (age 31)
Valerio Conti (ITA)	30 March 1993 (age 33)
Rui Costa (POR)	5 October 1986 (age 39)
Kristijan Đurasek (CRO)	26 July 1987 (age 38)
Roberto Ferrari (ITA)	9 March 1983 (age 43)
Fernando Gaviria (COL)	19 August 1994 (age 31)
Sergio Henao (COL)	10 December 1987 (age 38)
Alexander Kristoff (NOR)	5 July 1987 (age 38)
Vegard Stake Laengen (NOR)	7 February 1989 (age 37)
Marco Marcato (ITA)	11 February 1984 (age 42)
Dan Martin (IRE)	20 August 1986 (age 39)
Yousif Mirza (UAE)	8 October 1988 (age 37)

Rider	Date of birth
Juan Sebastián Molano (COL)	4 November 1994 (age 31)
Manuele Mori (ITA)	9 August 1980 (age 45)
Cristian Camilo Muñoz (COL)	20 March 1996 (age 30)
Ivo Oliveira (POR)	5 September 1996 (age 29)
Rui Oliveira (POR)	5 September 1996 (age 29)
Simone Petilli (ITA)	4 May 1993 (age 33)
Jasper Philipsen (BEL)	2 March 1998 (age 28)
Tadej Pogačar (SLO)	21 September 1998 (age 27)
Jan Polanc (SLO)	6 May 1992 (age 34)
Edward Ravasi (ITA)	5 June 1994 (age 31)
Alexandr Riabushenko (BLR)	12 October 1995 (age 30)
Rory Sutherland (AUS)	8 February 1982 (age 44)
Oliviero Troia (ITA)	1 September 1994 (age 31)
Diego Ulissi (ITA)	15 July 1989 (age 36)

Riders who joined the team for the 2019 season

Rider	2018 team
Tom Bohli	BMC Racing Team
Fernando Gaviria	Quick-Step Floors
Sergio Henao	Team Sky
Juan Sebastián Molano	Team Manzana Postobón
Cristian Camilo Muñoz	Coldeportes–Zenú–Sello Rojo
Ivo Oliveira	Hagens Berman Axeon
Rui Oliveira	Hagens Berman Axeon
Jasper Philipsen	Hagens Berman Axeon
Tadej Pogačar	Ljubljana Gusto Xaurum

Riders who left the team during or after the 2018 season

Rider	2019 team
Anass Aït El Abdia	VIB Sports
Darwin Atapuma	Cofidis
Matteo Bono	Retired
Filippo Ganna	Team Sky
Przemysław Niemiec	Retired
Ben Swift	Team Sky

== Season victories ==
Date	Race	Competition	Rider	Country	Location
19 January	Tour Down Under, Stage 5	UCI World Tour	Jasper Philipsen (BEL)	Australia	Strathalbyn
20 January	Tour Down Under, Teams classification	UCI World Tour	(Note: The riders on the squad were Sven Erik Bystrøm, Rory Sutherland, Ivo Oliveira, Jasper Philipsen, Tadej Pogačar, Jan Polanc and Diego Ulissi)	Australia	
27 January	Vuelta a San Juan, Stage 1	UCI America Tour	Fernando Gaviria (COL)	Argentina	Pocito
30 January	Vuelta a San Juan, Stage 4	UCI America Tour	Fernando Gaviria (COL)	Argentina	Villa San Agustín
14 February	Tour Colombia, Stage 3	UCI America Tour	Juan Sebastián Molano (COL)	Colombia	Rionegro
16 February	Tour of Oman, Stage 1	UCI Asia Tour	Alexander Kristoff (NOR)	Oman	Sohar
21 February	Volta ao Algarve, Stage 2	UCI Europe Tour	Tadej Pogačar (SLO)	Portugal	Fóia
24 February	Volta ao Algarve, Overall	UCI Europe Tour	Tadej Pogačar (SLO)	Portugal	
24 February	Volta ao Algarve, Young rider classification	UCI Europe Tour	Tadej Pogačar (SLO)	Portugal	
25 February	UAE Tour, Stage 2	UCI World Tour	Fernando Gaviria (COL)	United Arab Emirates	Abu Dhabi
31 March	Gent–Wevelgem	UCI World Tour	Alexander Kristoff (NOR)	Belgium	Wevelgem
13 April	Tour of the Basque Country, Young rider classification	UCI World Tour	Tadej Pogačar (SLO)	Spain	
13 May	Giro d'Italia, Stage 3	UCI World Tour	Fernando Gaviria (COL)	Italy	Orbetello
17 May	Tour of California, Stage 6	UCI World Tour	Tadej Pogačar (SLO)	United States	Mount Baldy
18 May	Tour of California, Overall	UCI World Tour	Tadej Pogačar (SLO)	United States	
18 May	Tour of California, Young rider classification	UCI World Tour	Tadej Pogačar (SLO)	United States	
1 June	Tour of Norway, Stage 5	UCI Europe Tour	Alexander Kristoff (NOR)	Norway	Drammen
2 June	Tour of Norway, Points classification	UCI Europe Tour	Alexander Kristoff (NOR)	Norway	
2 June	Tour of Norway, Overall	UCI Europe Tour	Alexander Kristoff (NOR)	Norway	
9 June	Gran Premio di Lugano	UCI Europe Tour	Diego Ulissi (ITA)	Switzerland	Lugano
13 June	Grand Prix of Aargau Canton	UCI Europe Tour	Alexander Kristoff (NOR)	Switzerland	Gippingen
21 June	Tour of Slovenia, Stage 3	UCI Europe Tour	Diego Ulissi (ITA)	Slovenia	Idrija
23 June	Tour of Slovenia, Overall	UCI Europe Tour	Diego Ulissi (ITA)	Slovenia	
23 June	Tour of Slovenia, Young classification	UCI Europe Tour	Tadej Pogačar (SLO)	Slovenia	
30 August	Deutschland Tour, Stage 2	UCI Europe Tour	Alexander Kristoff (NOR)	Germany	Göttingen
1 September	Vuelta a España, Stage 9	UCI World Tour	Tadej Pogačar (SLO)	Andorra	Encamp
6 September	Vuelta a España, Stage 13	UCI World Tour	Tadej Pogačar (SLO)	Spain	Los Machucos
14 September	Vuelta a España, Stage 20	UCI World Tour	Tadej Pogačar (SLO)	Spain	Plataforma de Gredos
15 September	Vuelta a España, Young rider classification	UCI World Tour	Tadej Pogačar (SLO)	Spain	
18 September	Okolo Slovenska, Stage 1A	UCI Europe Tour	Alexander Kristoff (NOR)	Slovakia	Bardejov
17 October	Tour of Guangxi, Stage 1	UCI World Tour	Fernando Gaviria (COL)	China	Beihai
21 October	Tour of Guangxi, Stage 5	UCI World Tour	Fernando Gaviria (COL)	China	Guilin

== National, Continental and World champions 2019 ==
Date	Race	Jersey	Rider	Country	Location
23 February	United Arab Emirates National Road Race Champion		Yousif Mirza (UAE)	United Arab Emirates	
1 March	United Arab Emirates National Time Trial Champion		Yousif Mirza (UAE)	United Arab Emirates	
7 June	Slovenian National Time Trial Championships		Tadej Pogačar (SLO)	Slovenia	Ljubljana
