= 2019 Groupama–FDJ season =

Groupama-FDJ
- 2019 season
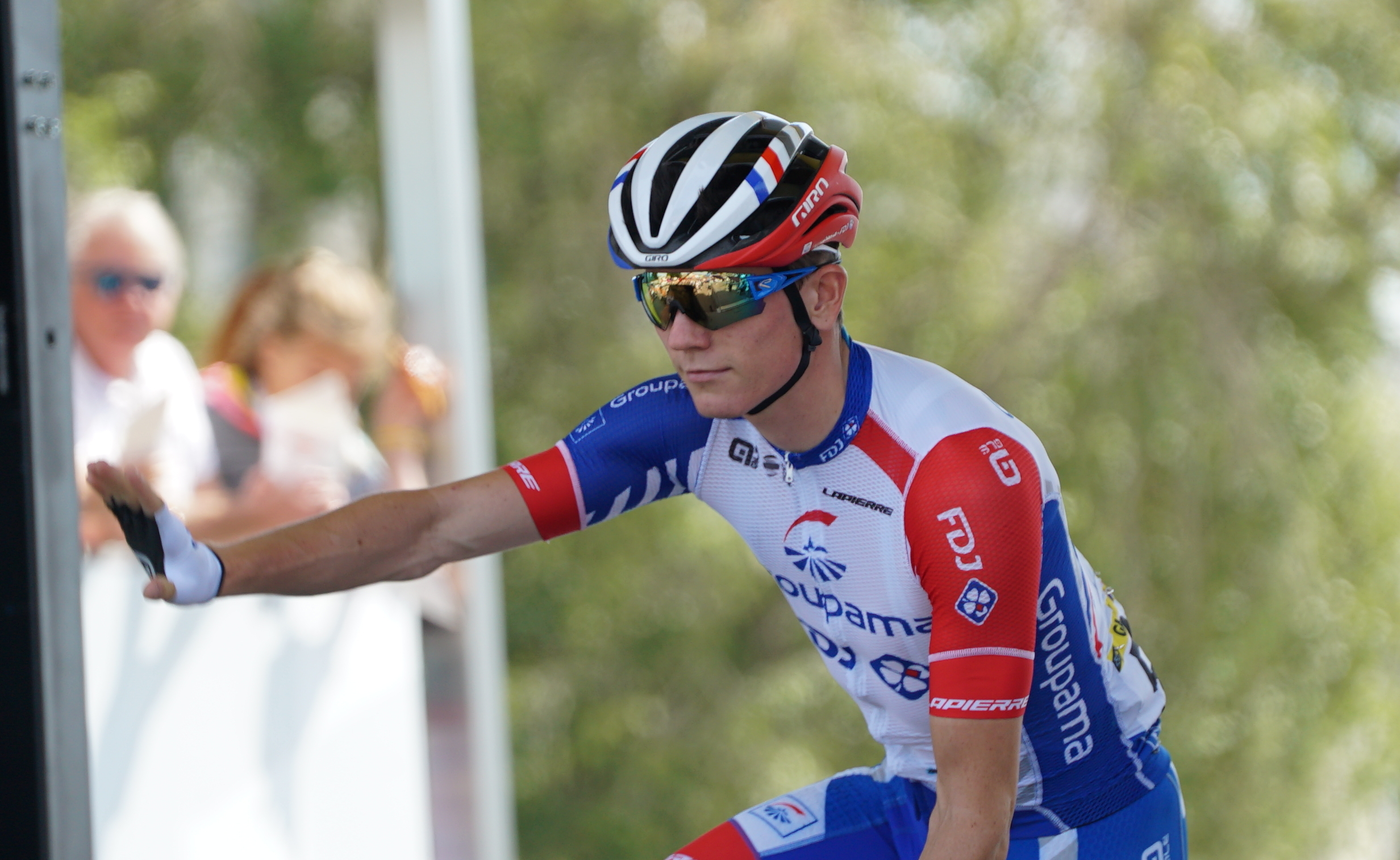
- David Gaudu on 2019 Tour de France
- UCI code: GFC
- Status: UCI WorldTeam
- Manager: Marc Madiot
- Main sponsor(s): Française des Jeux
- Based: France
- Bicycles: Lapierre
- Groupset: Shimano

Season victories
- One-day races: 2
- Stage race overall: 2
- Stage race stages: 11

The 2019 season for Groupama–FDJ began in January at the Tour Down Under. As a UCI WorldTeam, they were automatically invited and obligated to send a squad to every event in the UCI World Tour.

== Team roster ==
As of 27 January 2019.

Rider	Date of birth
Bruno Armirail (FRA)	11 April 1994 (aged 24)
William Bonnet (FRA)	25 June 1982 (aged 36)
Mickaël Delage (FRA)	6 August 1985 (aged 33)
Arnaud Démare (FRA)	26 August 1991 (aged 27)
Antoine Duchesne (CAN)	12 September 1991 (aged 27)
Kilian Frankiny (SUI)	26 January 1994 (aged 25)
David Gaudu (FRA)	10 October 1996 (aged 22)
Kévin Geniets (LUX)	9 January 1997 (age 29)
Jacopo Guarnieri (ITA)	14 August 1987 (aged 31)
Daniel Hoelgaard (NOR)	1 July 1993 (aged 25)
Ignatas Konovalovas (LIT)	8 December 1985 (aged 33)
Stefan Küng (SUI)	16 November 1993 (aged 25)
Mathieu Ladagnous (FRA)	12 December 1984 (aged 34)
Olivier Le Gac (FRA)	27 August 1993 (aged 25)
Tobias Ludvigsson (SWE)	22 February 1991 (aged 27)

Rider	Date of birth
Valentin Madouas (FRA)	12 July 1996 (aged 22)
Rudy Molard (FRA)	17 September 1989 (aged 29)
Steve Morabito (SUI)	30 January 1983 (aged 35)
Thibaut Pinot (FRA)	29 May 1990 (aged 28)
Georg Preidler (AUT)	17 June 1990 (aged 28)
Sébastien Reichenbach (SUI)	28 May 1989 (aged 29)
Anthony Roux (FRA)	18 April 1987 (aged 31)
Marc Sarreau (FRA)	10 June 1993 (aged 25)
Miles Scotson (AUS)	18 January 1994 (aged 25)
Romain Seigle (FRA)	11 October 1994 (aged 24)
Ramon Sinkeldam (NED)	9 February 1989 (aged 29)
Benjamin Thomas (FRA)	12 September 1995 (aged 23)
Benoît Vaugrenard (FRA)	5 January 1982 (aged 37)
Léo Vincent (FRA)	6 November 1995 (aged 23)

Riders who joined the team for the 2019 season

Rider	2018 team
Kilian Frankiny	BMC Racing Team
Stefan Küng	BMC Racing Team
Miles Scotson	BMC Racing Team

Riders who left the team during or after the 2018 season

Rider	2019 team
Davide Cimolai	Israel Cycling Academy
Jérémy Roy	Retires
Arthur Vichot	Vital Concept–B&B Hotels

In March Georg Preidler is suspended and is replaced by Kévin Geniets from the continental team.

== Season victories ==
Date	Race	Competition	Rider	Country	Location
9 February	Étoile de Bessèges, Stage 3	UCI Europe Tour	Marc Sarreau (FRA)	France	Bessèges
10 February	Étoile de Bessèges, Young rider classification	UCI Europe Tour	Valentin Madouas (FRA)	France	
10 February	Étoile de Bessèges, Teams classification	UCI Europe Tour	(Note: The riders on the squad were Bruno Armirail, Valentin Madouas, Tobias Ludvigsson, Marc Sarreau, Mickaël Delage, Antoine Duchesne and Romain Seigle)	France	
17 February	Tour de la Provence, Young rider classification	UCI Europe Tour	David Gaudu (FRA)	France	
17 February	Tour de la Provence, Teams classification	UCI Europe Tour	(Note: The riders on the squad were Thibaut Pinot, Antoine Duchesne, David Gaudu, Rudy Molard, Romain Seigle, Sébastien Reichenbach and Benjamin Thomas)	France	
22 February	Volta ao Algarve, Stage 3	UCI Europe Tour	Stefan Küng (SUI)	Portugal	Lagoa
24 February	Tour du Haut Var, Stage 3	UCI Europe Tour	Thibaut Pinot (FRA)	France	Mont Faron
24 February	Tour du Haut Var, Overall	UCI Europe Tour	Thibaut Pinot (FRA)	France	
24 February	Tour du Haut Var, Points classification	UCI Europe Tour	Thibaut Pinot (FRA)	France	
24 February	Tour du Haut Var, Teams classification	UCI Europe Tour	(Note: The riders on the squad were Thibaut Pinot, Mathieu Ladagnous, Kilian Frankiny, Tobias Ludvigsson, Rudy Molard, Steve Morabito and Georg Preidler)	France	
2 March	UAE Tour, Young rider classification	UCI World Tour	David Gaudu (FRA)	United Arab Emirates	
31 March	Cholet-Pays de Loire	UCI Europe Tour	Marc Sarreau (FRA)	France	Cholet
5 April	Route Adélie	UCI Europe Tour	Marc Sarreau (FRA)	France	Vitré
2 May	Tour de Romandie, Stage 2	UCI World Tour	Stefan Küng (SWI)	Switzerland	Morges
3 May	Tour de Romandie, Stage 3	UCI World Tour	David Gaudu (FRA)	Switzerland	Romont
5 May	Tour de Romandie, Young rider classification	UCI World Tour	David Gaudu (FRA)	Switzerland	
21 May	Giro d'Italia, Stage 10	UCI World Tour	Arnaud Démare (FRA)	Italy	Modena
26 May	Tour de l'Ain, Stage 3	UCI Europe Tour	Thibaut Pinot (FRA)	France	Col du Grand Colombier
26 May	Tour de l'Ain, Overall	UCI Europe Tour	Thibaut Pinot (FRA)	France	
26 May	Tour de l'Ain, Points classification	UCI Europe Tour	Thibaut Pinot (FRA)	France	
26 May	Tour de l'Ain, Mountains classification	UCI Europe Tour	Thibaut Pinot (FRA)	France	
21 June	Route d'Occitanie, Stage 2	UCI Europe Tour	Arnaud Démare (FRA)	France	Martres-Tolosane
23 June	Route d'Occitanie, Stage 4	UCI Europe Tour	Arnaud Démare (FRA)	France	Clermont-Pouyguillès
14 July	Tour de France, Stage 14	UCI World Tour	Thibaut Pinot (FRA)	France	Col du Tourmalet
30 July	Tour de Wallonie, Stage 4	UCI Europe Tour	Arnaud Démare (FRA)	Belgium	Lierneux
9 August	Tour de Pologne, Points classification	UCI World Tour	Marc Sarreau (FRA)	Poland	

== National, Continental and World champions ==
Date	Discipline	Jersey	Rider	Country	Location
26 June	Swiss National Time Trial Championships		Stefan Küng (SUI)	Switzerland	Weinfelden
27 June	French National Time Trial Championships		Benjamin Thomas (FRA)	France	La Haye-Fouassière
30 June	Swiss National Road Race Championships		Sébastien Reichenbach (SUI)	Switzerland	Fischingen
