= 2019 Team Bahrain–Merida season =

Bahrain–Merida Pro Cycling Team
- 2019 season
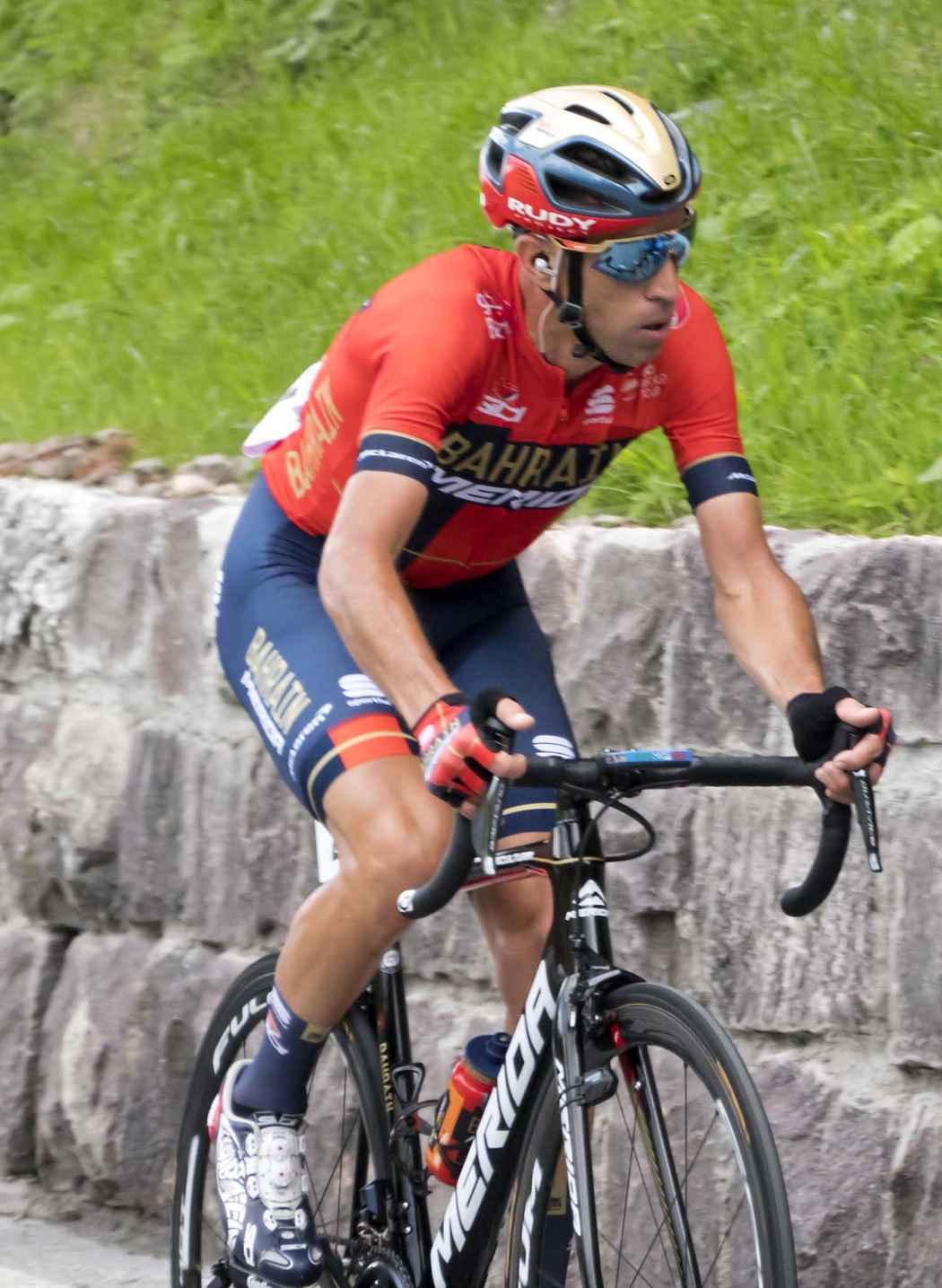
- Vincenzo Nibali in Giro d'Italia
- UCI code: TBM
- Status: UCI WorldTeam
- Manager: Brent Copeland
- Based: Bahrain

Season victories
- One-day races: 2
- Stage race overall: 1
- Stage race stages: 10
- National Championships: 2
- Jersey

The 2019 Bahrain–Merida Pro Cycling season was the third season of the Bahrain–Merida team, which was founded in 2016.

== Team roster ==
As of 28 December 2018.

Rider	Date of birth
Valerio Agnoli (ITA)	6 January 1985 (aged 33)
Yukiya Arashiro (JPN)	22 September 1984 (aged 34)
Phil Bauhaus (GER)	8 July 1994 (aged 24)
Grega Bole (SLO)	13 August 1985 (aged 33)
Damiano Caruso (ITA)	12 October 1987 (aged 31)
Sonny Colbrelli (ITA)	17 May 1990 (aged 28)
Rohan Dennis (AUS)	28 May 1990 (aged 28)
Feng Chun-kai (TWN)	2 November 1988 (aged 30)
Iván García (ESP)	20 November 1995 (aged 23)
Andrea Garosio (ITA)	6 December 1993 (aged 25)
Heinrich Haussler (AUS)	25 February 1984 (aged 34)
Kristijan Koren (SLO)	25 November 1986 (aged 32)

Rider	Date of birth
Matej Mohorič (SLO)	19 October 1994 (aged 24)
Antonio Nibali (ITA)	23 September 1992 (aged 26)
Vincenzo Nibali (ITA)	14 November 1984 (aged 34)
Domen Novak (SLO)	12 July 1995 (aged 23)
Mark Padun (UKR)	6 July 1996 (aged 22)
Hermann Pernsteiner (AUT)	7 August 1990 (aged 28)
Luka Pibernik (SLO)	23 October 1993 (aged 25)
Domenico Pozzovivo (ITA)	30 November 1982 (aged 36)
Marcel Sieberg (GER)	30 April 1982 (aged 36)
Dylan Teuns (BEL)	1 March 1992 (aged 26)
Jan Tratnik (SLO)	23 February 1990 (aged 28)
Wang Meiyin (CHN)	26 December 1988 (aged 29)
Stephen Williams (GBR)	9 June 1996 (aged 22)

Riders who joined the team for the 2019 season

Rider	2018 team
Phil Bauhaus	Team Sunweb
Damiano Caruso	BMC Racing Team
Rohan Dennis	BMC Racing Team
Andrea Garosio	D'Amico Utensilnord
Marcel Sieberg	Lotto–Soudal
Jan Tratnik	CCC–Sprandi–Polkowice
Dylan Teuns	BMC Racing Team
Stephen Williams	SEG Racing Academy

Riders who left the team during or after the 2018 season

Rider	2019 team
Manuele Boaro	Astana
Niccolò Bonifazio	Direct Énergie
Borut Božič	Retired
Enrico Gasparotto	Team Dimension Data
Gorka Izagirre	Astana
Ion Izagirre	Astana
Ramūnas Navardauskas	Delko–Marseille Provence
Franco Pellizotti	Retired
David Per	Adria Mobil
Kanstantsin Siutsou	-
Giovanni Visconti	Neri Sottoli–Selle Italia–KTM

== Season victories ==
Date	Race	Competition	Rider	Country	Location
19 February	Tour of Oman, Stage 4	UCI Asia Tour	Sonny Colbrelli (ITA)	Oman	Oman Convention and Exhibition Centre
30 April	Tour de Romandie, Prologue	UCI World Tour	Jan Tratnik (SLO)	Switzerland	Neuchâtel
16 May	Tour of California, Stage 5	UCI World Tour	Ivan Garcia Cortina (ESP)	United States	Ventura
10 June	Critérium du Dauphiné, Stage 2	UCI World Tour	Dylan Teuns (BEL)	France	Craponne-sur-Arzon
15 June	Tour de Suisse, Stage 1 (ITT)	UCI World Tour	Rohan Dennis (AUS)	Switzerland	Langnau in Emmental
11 July	Tour de France, Stage 5	UCI World Tour	Dylan Teuns (BEL)	France	La Planche des Belles Filles
26 July	Adriatica Ionica Race, Stage 3	UCI Europe Tour	Mark Padun (UKR)	Italy	Lake Misurina
27 July	Tour de France, Stage 20	UCI World Tour	Vincenzo Nibali (ITA)	France	Val Thorens
28 July	Adriatica Ionica Race, General classification	UCI Europe Tour	Mark Padun (UKR)	Italy	
28 July	Adriatica Ionica Race, Young classification	UCI Europe Tour	Mark Padun (UKR)	Italy	
9 August	Tour de Pologne, Stage 7	UCI World Tour	Matej Mohorič (SLO)	Poland	Bukowina Tatrzańska
1 September	Deutschland Tour, Stage 2	UCI Europe Tour	Sonny Colbrelli (ITA)	Germany	Erfurt
1 September	Deutschland Tour, Points classification	UCI Europe Tour	Sonny Colbrelli (ITA)	Germany	
15 September	Coppa Bernocchi	UCI Europe Tour	Phil Bauhaus (GER)	Italy	Legnano
6 October	Gran Premio Bruno Beghelli	UCI Europe Tour	Sonny Colbrelli (ITA)	Italy	Monteveglio

== National, Continental and World champions 2019 ==
Date	Discipline	Jersey	Rider	Country	Location
27 June	Ukrainian National Time Trial Championships		Mark Padun (UKR)	Ukraine	Ozerna
30 June	Slovenian National Road Race Championships		Domen Novak (SLO)	Slovenia	Radovljica
