= 2019 Trek–Segafredo (men's team) season =

Trek–Segafredo
- 2019 season
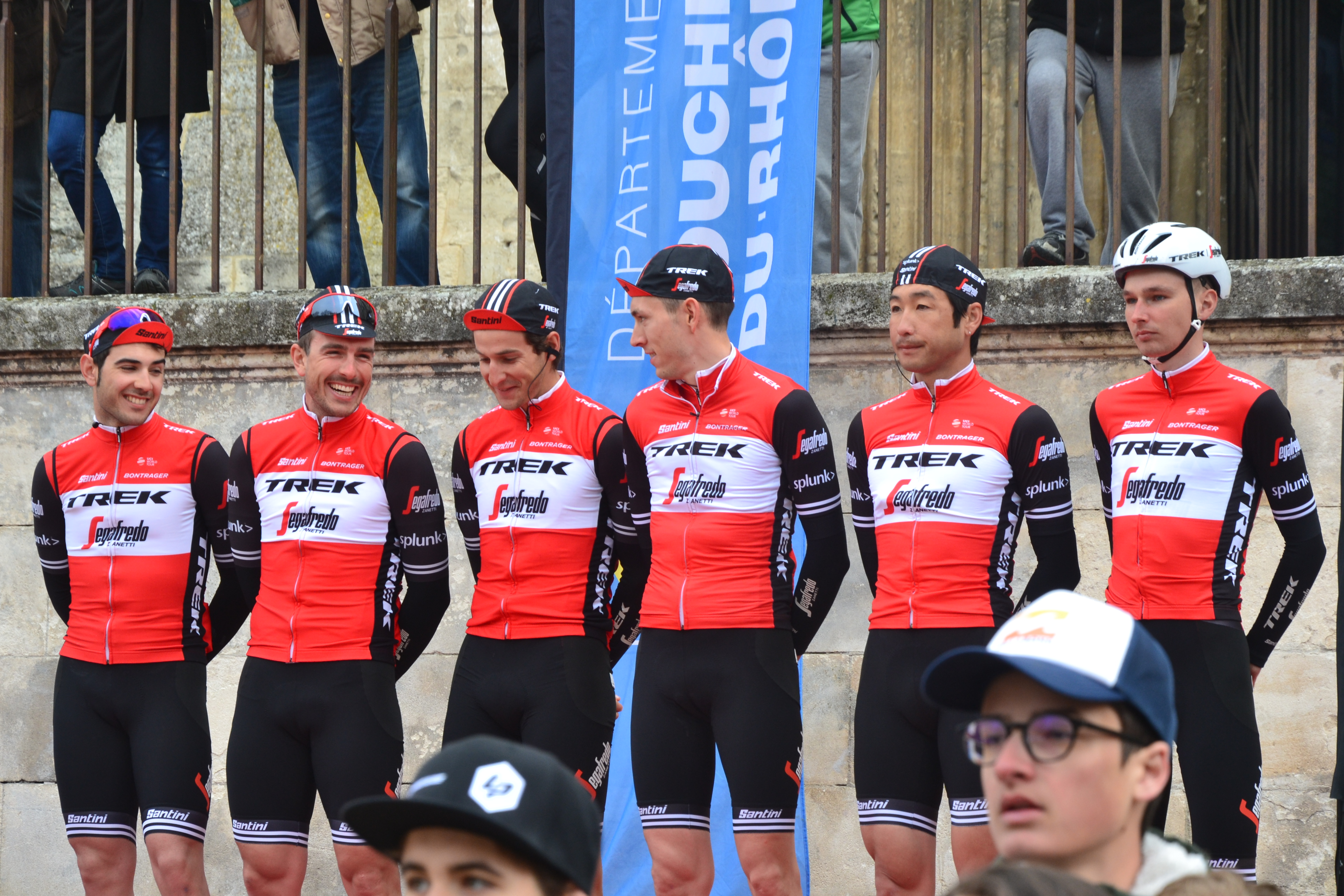
- Trek-Segafredo on 2019 Tour de la Provence
- UCI code: TFS
- Status: UCI WorldTeam
- World Tour Rank: 11th
- Manager: Luca Guercilena
- Main sponsor(s): Trek
- Based: United States
- Bicycles: Trek
- Groupset: Shimano

Season victories
- One-day races: 4
- Stage race overall: 1
- Stage race stages: 4
- World Championships: 1
- National Championships: 2
- Most wins: Giulio Ciccone & Bauke Mollema (2 Wins)
- Best ranked rider: Bauke Mollema (11th)
- Jersey

The 2019 cycling season began in Australia at the Tour Down Under for Trek–Segafredo in January.

As a UCI WorldTeam, they are automatically invited and obliged to send a squad to every event in the UCI World Tour.

== Roster ==
As of 29 August 2019.

Rider	Date of birth
Fumiyuki Beppu (JPN)	April 10, 1983 (age 43)
Julien Bernard (FRA)	March 17, 1992 (age 34)
Gianluca Brambilla (ITA)	August 22, 1987 (age 38)
Giulio Ciccone (ITA)	December 20, 1994 (age 31)
Will Clarke (AUS)	April 11, 1985 (age 41)
Nicola Conci (ITA)	January 5, 1997 (age 29)
Koen de Kort (NED)	September 8, 1982 (age 43)
John Degenkolb (GER)	January 7, 1989 (age 37)
Niklas Eg (DEN)	January 6, 1995 (age 31)
Fabio Felline (ITA)	March 29, 1990 (age 36)
Alex Frame (NZL)	June 18, 1993 (age 32)
Michael Gogl (AUT)	November 4, 1993 (age 32)
Markel Irizar (ESP)	February 5, 1980 (age 46)

Rider	Date of birth
Alex Kirsch (LUX)	June 12, 1992 (age 33)
Bauke Mollema (NED)	November 26, 1986 (age 39)
Jacopo Mosca (ITA)	August 29, 1993 (age 32)
Matteo Moschetti (ITA)	August 14, 1996 (age 29)
Ryan Mullen (IRE)	August 7, 1994 (age 31)
Jarlinson Pantano (COL)	November 19, 1988 (age 37)
Mads Pedersen (DEN)	December 18, 1995 (age 30)
Richie Porte (AUS)	January 30, 1985 (age 41)
Kiel Reijnen (USA)	June 1, 1986 (age 39)
Toms Skujiņš (LAT)	June 15, 1991 (age 34)
Peter Stetina (USA)	August 8, 1987 (age 38)
Jasper Stuyven (BEL)	April 17, 1992 (age 34)
Edward Theuns (BEL)	April 30, 1991 (age 35)

Riders who joined the team for the 2019 season

Rider	2018 team
Giulio Ciccone	Bardiani–CSF
Will Clarke	EF Education First–Drapac p/b Cannondale
Alex Kirsch	WB Aqua Protect Veranclassic
Jacopo Mosca	D'Amico–UM Tools
Matteo Moschetti	Polartec–Kometa
Richie Porte	BMC Racing Team
Edward Theuns	Team Sunweb

Riders who left the team during or after the 2018 season

Rider	2019 team
Eugenio Alafaci	EvoPro Racing
Matthias Brändle	Israel Cycling Academy
Gregory Daniel	DCBank Pro Cycling Team
Laurent Didier	Retired
Ruben Guerreiro	Team Katusha–Alpecin
Tsgabu Grmay	Mitchelton–Scott
Giacomo Nizzolo	Team Dimension Data
Grégory Rast	Retired
Boy van Poppel	Roompot–Charles

== Season victories ==
Date	Race	Competition	Rider	Country	Location
20 January	Tour Down Under, Stage 6	UCI World Tour	Richie Porte (AUS)	Australia	Willunga Hill
17 February	Tour de la Provence, Stage 4	UCI Europe Tour	John Degenkolb (GER)	France	Aix-en-Provence
23 February	Tour du Haut Var, Stage 2	UCI Europe Tour	Giulio Ciccone (ITA)	France	Mons
28 May	Giro d'Italia, Stage 16	UCI World Tour	Giulio Ciccone (ITA)	Italy	Ponte di Legno
2 June	Giro d'Italia, Mountains classification	UCI World Tour	Giulio Ciccone (ITA)	Italy	
1 September	Deutschland Tour, Overall	UCI Europe Tour	Jasper Stuyven (BEL)	Germany	
21 September	Grand Prix Impanis-Van Petegem	UCI Europe Tour	Edward Theuns (BEL)	Belgium	Haacht
22 September	Grand Prix d'Isbergues	UCI Europe Tour	Mads Pedersen (DEN)	France	Isbergues
12 October	Giro di Lombardia	UCI World Tour	Bauke Mollema (NED)	Italy	Como
20 October	Japan Cup Cycle Road Race	UCI Asia Tour	Bauke Mollema (NED)	Japan	Utsunomiya

== National, Continental and World Champions ==
Date	Discipline	Jersey	Rider	Country	Location
27 June	Irish National Time Trial Champion		Ryan Mullen (IRL)	Ireland	Newtown Cunningham
30 June	Latvian National Road Race Champion		Toms Skujiņš (LAT)	Latvia	Kuldiga
29 September	World Road Race Champion		Mads Pedersen (DEN)	United Kingdom	Harrogate
