= 2019 EF Education First season =

EF Education First
- 2019 season
- UCI code: EFD
- Status: UCI WorldTeam
- Manager: Jonathan Vaughters
- Main sponsor(s): Cannondale
- Based: Boulder, Colorado, United States
- Bicycles: Cannondale
- Groupset: Shimano

Season victories
- One-day races: 3
- Stage race stages: 10
- National Championships: 4
- Jersey

The 2019 season for the EF Education First cycling team began in January at the Tour Down Under. As a UCI WorldTeam, they are obligated to send a squad to every event in the UCI World Tour.

== Team roster ==
As of January 27, 2019.

Rider	Date of birth
Sean Bennett (USA)	March 31, 1996 (aged 22)
Alberto Bettiol (ITA)	October 29, 1993 (aged 25)
Matti Breschel (DEN)	August 31, 1984 (aged 34)
Nathan Brown (USA)	July 7, 1991 (aged 27)
Jonathan Caicedo (ECU)	April 28, 1993 (aged 25)
Hugh Carthy (GBR)	July 9, 1994 (aged 24)
Simon Clarke (AUS)	July 18, 1986 (aged 32)
Lawson Craddock (USA)	February 20, 1992 (aged 26)
Mitchell Docker (AUS)	October 2, 1986 (aged 32)
Joe Dombrowski (USA)	May 12, 1991 (aged 27)
Moreno Hofland (NED)	August 31, 1991 (aged 27)
Alex Howes (USA)	January 1, 1988 (aged 31)
Tanel Kangert (EST)	March 11, 1987 (aged 31)
Sebastian Langeveld (NED)	January 17, 1985 (aged 34)

Rider	Date of birth
Daniel Martínez (COL)	April 25, 1996 (aged 22)
Daniel McLay (GBR)	January 3, 1992 (aged 27)
Sacha Modolo (ITA)	June 19, 1987 (aged 31)
Lachlan Morton (AUS)	January 2, 1992 (aged 27)
Logan Owen (USA)	March 23, 1995 (aged 23)
Taylor Phinney (USA)	June 27, 1990 (aged 28)
Tom Scully (NZL)	January 14, 1990 (aged 29)
Rigoberto Urán (COL)	January 26, 1987 (aged 32)
Julius van den Berg (NED)	October 23, 1996 (aged 22)
Tejay van Garderen (USA)	August 12, 1988 (aged 30)
Sep Vanmarcke (BEL)	July 28, 1988 (aged 30)
James Whelan (AUS)	July 11, 1996 (aged 22)
Michael Woods (CAN)	October 12, 1986 (aged 32)

Riders who joined the team for the 2019 season

Rider	2018 team
Sean Bennett	Hagens Berman Axeon
Alberto Bettiol	BMC Racing Team
Jonathan Caicedo	Medellín
Moreno Hofland	Lotto–Soudal
Tanel Kangert	Astana
Lachlan Morton	Team Dimension Data
Tejay van Garderen	BMC Racing Team
James Whelan	Drapac–EF p/b Cannondale Holistic Development Team

Riders who left the team during or after the 2018 season

Rider	2019 team
Brendan Canty	-
Julián Cardona	Androni Giocattoli–Sidermec
Will Clarke	Trek–Segafredo
Kim Magnusson	Riwal Readynez
Daniel Moreno	-
Pierre Rolland	Vital Concept–B&B Hotels
Tom Van Asbroeck	Israel Cycling Academy

== Season victories ==
Date	Race	Competition	Rider	Country	Location
30 January	Herald Sun Tour, Stage 1	UCI Oceania Tour	Daniel McLay (GBR)	Australia	Phillip Island
31 January	Herald Sun Tour, Stage 2	UCI Oceania Tour	Michael Woods (CAN)	Australia	Churchill
12 February	Tour Colombia, Stage 1 (TTT)	UCI America Tour	(Note: The winning riders were Nathan Brown, Lawson Craddock, Taylor Phinney, Alex Howes, Daniel Martínez and Rigoberto Urán)	Colombia	Medellín
17 February	Tour Colombia, Teams classification	UCI America Tour	(Note: The riders on the squad were Nathan Brown, Lawson Craddock, Taylor Phinney, Alex Howes, Daniel Martínez and Rigoberto Urán)	Colombia	
17 February	Tour de la Provence, Points classification	UCI Europe Tour	Simon Clarke (AUS)	France	
22 February	Tour du Haut Var, Stage 1	UCI Europe Tour	Sep Vanmarcke (BEL)	France	Mandelieu-la-Napoule
16 March	Paris–Nice, Stage 7	UCI World Tour	Daniel Martínez (COL)	France	Col de Turini
19 March	Tirreno–Adriatico, Teams classification	UCI World Tour	(Note: The riders on the squad were Sep Vanmarcke, Alberto Bettiol, Simon Clarke, Tanel Kangert, Sebastian Langeveld, Sacha Modolo and Taylor Phinney)	Italy	
7 April	Tour of Flanders	UCI World Tour	Alberto Bettiol (ITA)	Belgium	Oudenaarde
5 May	Tour de Romandie, Teams classification	UCI World Tour	(Note: The riders on the squad were Nathan Brown, Jonathan Caicedo, Hugh Carthy, Joe Dombrowski, Tanel Kangert, Daniel Martínez and Michael Woods)	Switzerland	
18 May	Tour of California, Teams classification	UCI World Tour	(Note: The riders on the squad were Rigoberto Urán, Lawson Craddock, Sergio Higuita, Alex Howes, Lachlan Morton, Taylor Phinney and Tejay van Garderen)	United States	
23 June	Tour de Suisse, Stage 9	UCI World Tour	Hugh Carthy (GBR)	Switzerland	Ulrichen
23 June	Tour de Suisse, Mountains classification	UCI World Tour	Hugh Carthy (GBR)	Switzerland	
17 August	Tour of Utah, Stage 5	UCI America Tour	Lachlan Morton (AUS)	United States	Canyons Village
18 August	Tour of Utah, Stage 6	UCI America Tour	Joe Dombrowski (USA)	United States	Park City
1 September	Bretagne Classic Ouest-France	UCI World Tour	Sep Vanmarcke (BEL)	France	Plouay
12 September	Vuelta a España, Stage 12	UCI World Tour	Sergio Higuita (COL)	Spain	Becerril de la Sierra
9 October	Milano–Torino	UCI Europe Tour	Michael Woods (CAN)	Italy	Turin
18 October	Tour of Guangxi, Stage 2	UCI World Tour	Daniel McLay (GBR)	China	Qinzhou

== National, Continental and World champions ==
Date	Discipline	Jersey	Rider	Country	Location
1 February	Colombian National Time Trial Championships		Daniel Martínez (COL)	Colombia	Villavicencio
22 June	Ecuadorian National Time Trial Championships		Jonathan Caicedo (ECU)	Ecuador	
23 June	Ecuadorian National Road Race Championships		Jonathan Caicedo (ECU)	Ecuador	
30 June	United States National Road Race Championships		Alex Howes (USA)	United States	Knoxville
