= 2019 Katusha–Alpecin season =

Katusha–Alpecin
- 2019 season
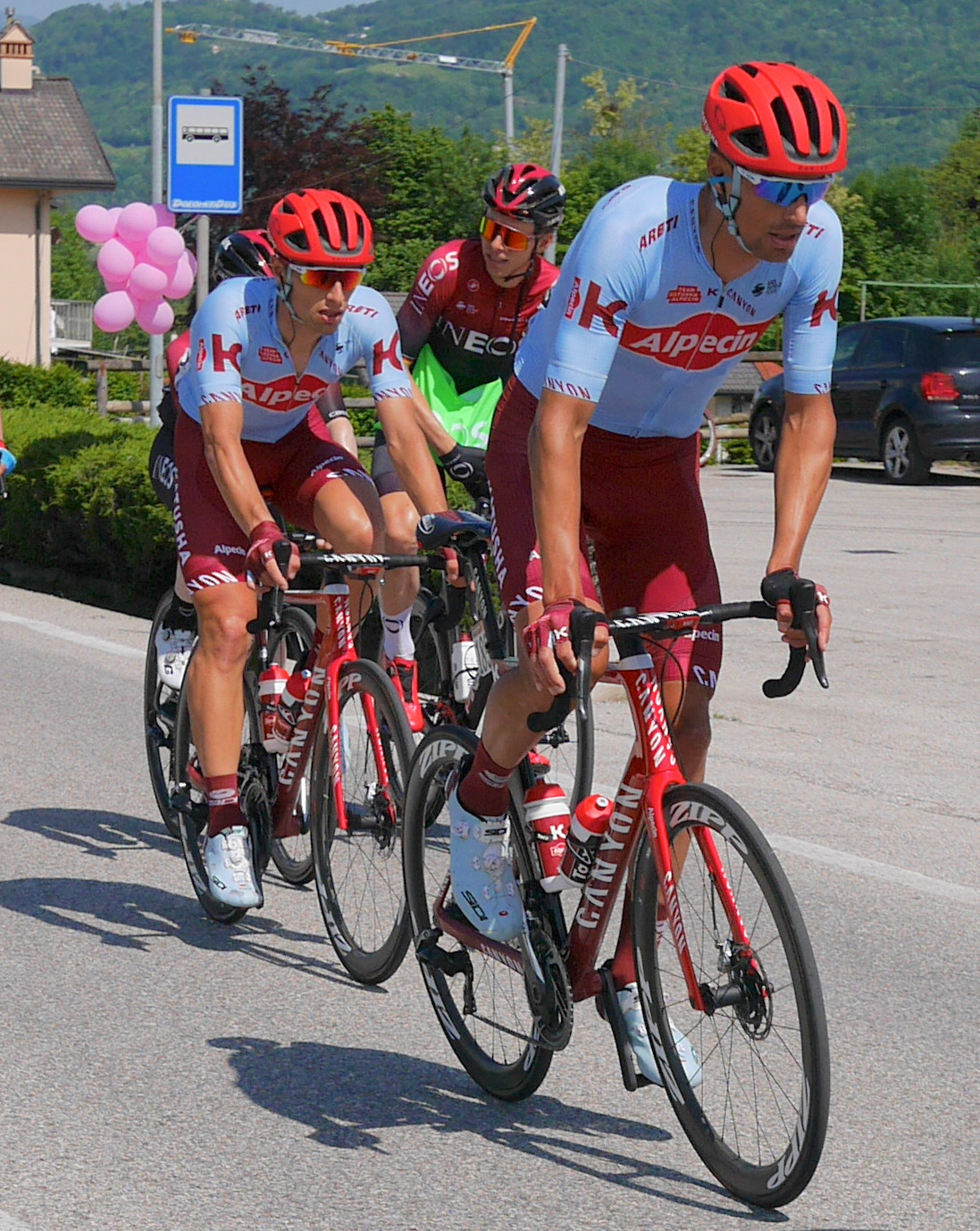
- Katusha-Alpecin in 2019 Giro d'Italia
- UCI code: TKA
- Status: UCI WorldTeam
- Manager: Vyacheslav Ekimov
- Main sponsor(s): Gazprom & Itera & Rostec & Alpecin
- Based: Switzerland
- Bicycles: Canyon

Season victories
- One-day races: 1
- Stage race stages: 2
- National Championships: 2

The 2019 season for Team Katusha–Alpecin will begin in January at the Tour Down Under. As a UCI WorldTeam, they will be automatically invited and obligated to send a squad to every event in the UCI World Tour.

== Team roster ==
As of 5 May 2019.

On 9 May 2019 Marcel Kittel terminated relationship with the club on his own request.

Rider	Date of birth
Enrico Battaglin (ITA)	17 November 1989 (aged 29)
Jenthe Biermans (BEL)	30 October 1995 (aged 23)
Ian Boswell (USA)	7 February 1991 (aged 27)
Steff Cras (BEL)	13 February 1996 (aged 22)
Jens Debusschere (BEL)	28 August 1989 (aged 29)
Alex Dowsett (GBR)	3 October 1988 (aged 30)
Matteo Fabbro (ITA)	10 April 1995 (aged 23)
José Gonçalves (POR)	13 February 1989 (aged 29)
Ruben Guerreiro (POR)	6 July 1994 (aged 24)
Nathan Haas (AUS)	12 March 1989 (aged 29)
Marco Haller (AUT)	1 April 1991 (aged 27)
Reto Hollenstein (SUI)	22 August 1985 (aged 33)

Rider	Date of birth
Marcel Kittel (Note: Marcel Kittel terminated contract on 5 May) (GER)	11 May 1988 (aged 30)
Pavel Kochetkov (RUS)	7 March 1986 (aged 32)
Vyacheslav Kuznetsov (RUS)	24 June 1989 (aged 29)
Daniel Navarro (ESP)	18 July 1983 (aged 35)
Nils Politt (GER)	6 March 1994 (aged 24)
Willie Smit (RSA)	29 December 1992 (aged 25)
Simon Špilak (SLO)	23 June 1986 (aged 32)
Dmitry Strakhov (RUS)	17 May 1995 (aged 23)
Harry Tanfield (GBR)	7 December 1994 (aged 24)
Mads Würtz Schmidt (DEN)	31 March 1994 (aged 24)
Rick Zabel (GER)	7 December 1993 (aged 25)
Ilnur Zakarin (RUS)	15 September 1989 (aged 29)

Riders who joined the team for the 2019 season

Rider	2018 team
Enrico Battaglin	LottoNL–Jumbo
Jens Debusschere	Lotto–Soudal
Ruben Guerreiro	Trek–Segafredo
Daniel Navarro	Cofidis
Dmitry Strakhov	Lokosphinx
Harry Tanfield	Canyon Eisberg

Riders who left the team during or after the 2018 season

Rider	2019 team
Maxim Belkov	-
Robert Kišerlovski	Retires
Maurits Lammertink	Roompot–Charles
Tiago Machado	Sporting / Tavira
Tony Martin	Team Jumbo–Visma
Marco Mathis	Cofidis
Baptiste Planckaert	Wallonie Bruxelles
Jhonatan Restrepo	Team Manzana Postobón

== Season victories ==
Date	Race	Competition	Rider	Country	Location
3 February	Trofeo Palma	UCI Europe Tour	Marcel Kittel (GER)	Spain	Palma de Mallorca
21 February	Tour of Oman, Teams classification	UCI Asia Tour	(Note: The riders on the squad were Nathan Haas, Enrico Battaglin, Jenthe Biermans, Ian Boswell, Steff Cras, Matteo Fabbro and Reto Hollenstein)	Oman	
3 May	Tour de Yorkshire, Stage 2	UCI Europe Tour	Rick Zabel (GER)	United Kingdom	Bedale
24 May	Giro d'Italia, Stage 13	UCI World Tour	Ilnur Zakarin (RUS)	Italy	Ceresole Reale (Serrù Lake)

== National, Continental and World champions 2019 ==
Date	Discipline	Jersey	Rider	Country	Location
27 June	British National Time Trial Championships		Alex Dowsett (GBR)	United Kingdom	Norfolk
28 June	Portuguese National Time Trial Championships		José Gonçalves (POR)	Portugal	Melgaço
