= 2019 AG2R La Mondiale season =

AG2R La Mondiale
- 2019 season
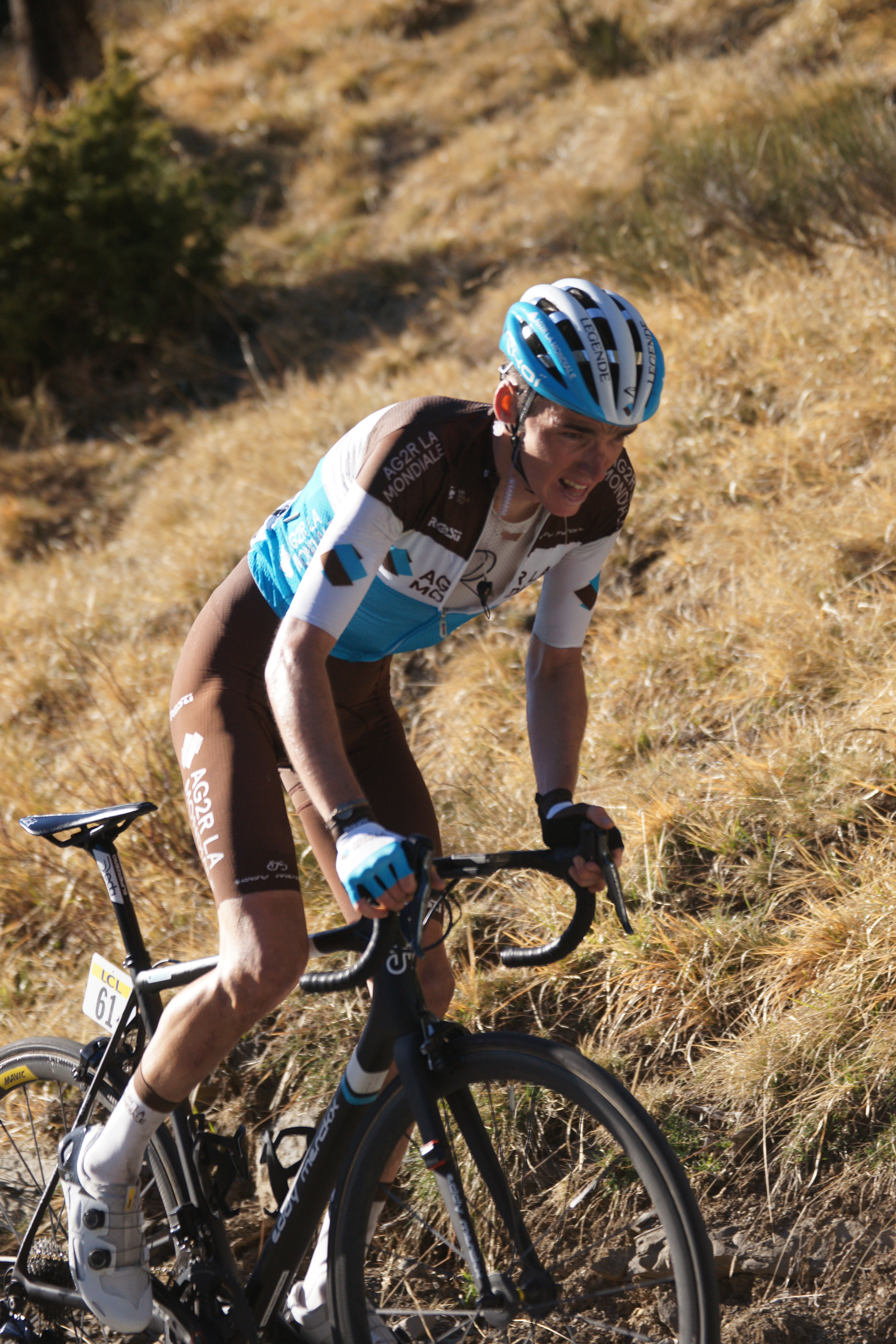
- Romain Bardet on 2019 Paris–Nice
- UCI code: ALM
- Status: UCI WorldTeam
- World Tour Rank: 14th (6647 points)
- Manager: Vincent Lavenu
- Main sponsor(s): AG2R Group & La Mondiale Group
- Based: France
- Bicycles: Eddy Merckx
- Groupset: Shimano

Season victories
- One-day races: 5
- Stage race overall: 1
- Stage race stages: 6
- National Championships: 2
- Most wins: Benoît Cosnefroy (4 wins)
- Best ranked rider: Oliver Naesen (14th)

The 2019 season for the AG2R La Mondiale cycling team will begin in January at the Tour Down Under. As a UCI WorldTeam, they will be automatically invited and obligated to send a squad to every event in the UCI World Tour.

== Team roster ==
As of 6 August 2019.

Rider	Date of birth
Gediminas Bagdonas (LTU)	26 December 1985 (aged 33)
Romain Bardet (FRA)	9 November 1990 (aged 28)
François Bidard (FRA)	12 March 1992 (aged 27)
Geoffrey Bouchard (FRA)	1 April 1992 (aged 27)
Clément Champoussin (Note: Champoussin joined the team on 1 August, as a stagiaire.) (FRA)	29 May 1998 (aged 21)
Mikaël Cherel (FRA)	17 March 1986 (aged 33)
Clément Chevrier (FRA)	29 June 1992 (aged 27)
Benoît Cosnefroy (FRA)	17 October 1995 (aged 23)
Nico Denz (GER)	15 February 1994 (aged 25)
Silvan Dillier (SUI)	3 August 1990 (aged 29)
Axel Domont (FRA)	7 August 1990 (aged 28)
Samuel Dumoulin (FRA)	20 August 1980 (aged 38)
Hubert Dupont (FRA)	13 November 1980 (aged 38)
Julien Duval (FRA)	27 May 1990 (aged 29)
Mathias Frank (SUI)	9 December 1986 (aged 32)

Rider	Date of birth
Tony Gallopin (FRA)	24 May 1988 (aged 31)
Ben Gastauer (LUX)	14 November 1987 (aged 31)
Alexandre Geniez (FRA)	16 April 1988 (aged 31)
Dorian Godon (FRA)	25 May 1996 (aged 23)
Alexis Gougeard (FRA)	5 March 1993 (aged 26)
Jaakko Hänninen (Note: Hänninen joined the team on 1 August) (FIN)	16 April 1997 (aged 22)
Quentin Jaurégui (FRA)	22 April 1994 (aged 25)
Matteo Jorgenson (Note: Jorgenson joined the team on 1 August, as a stagiaire.) (USA)	1 July 1999 (aged 20)
Anthony Jullien (Note: Jullien joined the team on 1 August, as a stagiaire.) (FRA)	5 March 1998 (aged 21)
Pierre Latour (FRA)	12 October 1993 (aged 25)
Oliver Naesen (BEL)	16 September 1990 (aged 28)
Nans Peters (FRA)	12 March 1994 (aged 25)
Stijn Vandenbergh (BEL)	25 April 1984 (aged 35)
Clément Venturini (FRA)	16 October 1993 (aged 25)
Alexis Vuillermoz (FRA)	1 June 1988 (aged 31)
Larry Warbasse (USA)	28 June 1990 (aged 29)

Riders who joined the team for the 2019 season

Rider	2018 team
Geoffrey Bouchard	CR4C Roanne
Dorian Godon	Cofidis
Jaakko Hänninen	Probikeshop Saint-Étienne Loire
Larry Warbasse	Aqua Blue Sport

Riders who left the team during or after the 2018 season

Rider	2019 team
Jan Bakelants	Team Sunweb
Rudy Barbier	Israel Cycling Academy
Cyril Gautier	Vital Concept–B&B Hotels
Matteo Montaguti	Androni Giocattoli–Sidermec

== Season victories ==
Date	Race	Competition	Rider	Country	Location
3 March	La Drôme Classic	UCI Europe Tour	Alexis Vuillermoz (FRA)	France	Livron-sur-Drôme
11 April	Circuit de la Sarthe, Stage 3	UCI Europe Tour	Alexis Gougeard (FRA)	France	Pré-en-Pail-Saint-Samson
12 April	Circuit de la Sarthe, Overall	UCI Europe Tour	Alexis Gougeard (FRA)	France	
16 April	Paris–Camembert	UCI Europe Tour	Benoît Cosnefroy (FRA)	France	Livarot
25 May	Tour de l'Ain, Stage 2	UCI Europe Tour	Alexandre Geniez (FRA)	France	Col de la Faucille
29 May	Giro d'Italia, Stage 17	UCI World Tour	Nans Peters (FRA)	Italy	Anterselva/Antholz
26 May	Tour de l'Ain, Teams classification	UCI Europe Tour	(Note: The riders on the squad were Alexandre Geniez, Clément Chevrier, Mathias Frank, Geoffrey Bouchard, Alexis Gougeard and Aurélien Paret-Peintre)	France	
1 June	Grand Prix de Plumelec-Morbihan	UCI Europe Tour	Benoît Cosnefroy (FRA)	France	Plumelec
2 June	Boucles de l'Aulne	UCI Europe Tour	Alexis Gougeard (FRA)	France	Châteaulin
6 June	Boucles de la Mayenne, Prologue	UCI Europe Tour	Dorian Godon (FRA)	France	Laval
9 June	Boucles de la Mayenne, Young rider classification	UCI Europe Tour	Dorian Godon (FRA)	France	
28 July	Tour de France, Mountains classification	UCI World Tour	Romain Bardet (FRA)	France	
18 August	BinckBank Tour, Stage 7	UCI World Tour	Oliver Naesen (BEL)	Belgium	Geraardsbergen
18 August	Polynormande	UCI Europe Tour	Benoît Cosnefroy (FRA)	France	Saint-Martin-de-Landelles
23 August	Tour du Limousin, Stage 3	UCI Europe Tour	Benoît Cosnefroy (FRA)	France	Beynat
24 August	Tour du Limousin, Overall	UCI Europe Tour	Benoît Cosnefroy (FRA)	France	

== National, Continental and World champions 2019 ==
Date	Discipline	Jersey	Rider	Country	Location
19 January	French National Cyclo-cross Championships		Clément Venturini (FRA)	France	Besançon
28 June	Lithuanian National Time Trial Championships		Gediminas Bagdonas (LTU)	Lithuania	Šilalė
