= James Victor (cycling) =

Australian cycling coach

James Victor is an Australian cycling coach. He was educated at Iona College, Brisbane, Queensland. In 2011 in Europe, he helped the endurance male track cyclists continued their all-year development through the Australian Institute of Sport Road Program in Varese, Italy

== Positions ==
- Australian Institute of Sport Cycling Women's Road Coach.
- Australian Institute of Sport. Cycling Under 23 Road Coach
- Australian Institute of Sport. Track Endurance Road Coach.
- Australian Institute of Sport. Sports Director at JAYCO AIS cycling team.
- Cycling Australia National Under 23 Men's Road Coach
- Cycling Australia Para-cycling, Head Coach.
- Queensland Academy of Sport Head Cycling Coach
- Mitchelton Scott Head Sports Director.
