= Mitchelton–BikeExchange =

Team information
- UCI code: MBE
- Registered: China
- Founded: 2017
- Disbanded: 2019
- Discipline: Road
- Status: UCI Continental

Key personnel
- Team manager: James Victor

Team name history
- 2017 2018–2019: Mitchelton–Scott; Mitchelton–BikeExchange

Mitchelton–BikeExchange was a Chinese UCI Continental cycling team established in 2017. It was set up as a development team for the UCI WorldTeam Orica–Scott.

In January 2018 the team announced that BikeExchange would join the team as a co-naming sponsor. The team folded at the end of the 2019 season.

== 2019 Team roster ==
Ages as of 31 December 2019

Rider	Date of birth
Bi Wenhui (CHN)	4 April 1993 (aged 26)
Bieken Nazaerbieke (CHN)	15 May 1994 (aged 25)
Brayan Chaves (COL)	30 May 1997 (aged 22)
Hao Ran (CHN)	8 January 1998 (aged 21)

Rider	Date of birth
Jiang Zhihui (CHN)	3 March 1994 (aged 25)
Liu Jiankun (CHN)	21 June 1995 (aged 24)
Niu Yikui (CHN)	2 August 1994 (aged 25)
James Oram (NZL)	17 June 1993 (aged 26)

== Major wins ==
2017
Stage 5b (ITT) Girobio, Lucas Hamilton
Stage 7 Girobio, Jai Hindley
Overall Tour of Fuzhou, Jai Hindley

1st Stage 4, Jai Hindley

2018
Australia U23 National Time Trial Championships, Callum Scotson
Giro del Belvedere, Robert Stannard
Stage 7 Le Tour de Bretagne Cycliste, Robert Stannard
Stage 9b (ITT) Giro Ciclistico d'Italia, Robert Stannard
Stage 13 Tour of Qinghai Lake, Kaden Groves
Gran Premio di Poggiana, Robert Stannard
Il Piccolo Lombardia, Robert Stannard
Stage 1 Tour of Quanzhou Bay, Kaden Groves
Stage 5 Tour of Fuzhou, Kaden Groves

== National Champions ==
2018
Australia U23 Time Trial, Callum Scotson
