= 2019 UCI World Tour =

Road cycling competitions

2019 UCI WorldTour
- Ninth edition of the UCI WorldTour

Details
- Dates: 15 January – 22 October
- Location: Australia; China; Europe; Middle East; North America
- Races: 38

The 2019 UCI World Tour was a series of races that included thirty-eight road cycling events throughout the 2019 men's cycling season. It was the first time since the World Tour was launched by the Union Cycliste Internationale (UCI) in 2009 that it was not a ranking competition in its own right. The tour started with the opening stage of the Tour Down Under on 15 January and concluded with the final stage of the Tour of Guangxi on 22 October.

== Events ==
The 2019 calendar was initially announced in June 2018, with the Abu Dhabi Tour being replaced with the UAE Tour, following its merger with the Dubai Tour. In September 2018, the Three Days of Bruges–De Panne was promoted to World Tour level, having been a 1.HC-categorised race in 2018. In November 2018, the Presidential Cycling Tour of Turkey was announced to be moving back to April, after the two most recent editions were held in October.

Races in the 2019 UCI World Tour
Race	Date	Winner	Second	Third
(Australia) Tour Down Under	15–20 January	Daryl Impey (RSA)	Richie Porte (AUS)	Wout Poels (NED)
(Australia) Great Ocean Road Race	27 January	Elia Viviani (ITA)	Caleb Ewan (AUS)	Daryl Impey (RSA)
(United Arab Emirates) UAE Tour	24 February – 2 March	Primož Roglič (SLO)	Alejandro Valverde (ESP)	David Gaudu (FRA)
(Belgium) Omloop Het Nieuwsblad	2 March	Zdeněk Štybar (CZE)	Greg Van Avermaet (BEL)	Tim Wellens (BEL)
(Italy) Strade Bianche	9 March	Julian Alaphilippe (FRA)	Jakob Fuglsang (DEN)	Wout van Aert (BEL)
(France) Paris–Nice	10–17 March	Egan Bernal (COL)	Nairo Quintana (COL)	Michał Kwiatkowski (POL)
(Italy) Tirreno–Adriatico	13–19 March	Primož Roglič (SLO)	Adam Yates (GBR)	Jakob Fuglsang (DEN)
(Italy) Milan–San Remo	23 March	Julian Alaphilippe (FRA)	Oliver Naesen (BEL)	Michał Kwiatkowski (POL)
(Spain) Volta a Catalunya	25–31 March	Miguel Ángel López (COL)	Adam Yates (GBR)	Egan Bernal (COL)
(Belgium) Three Days of Bruges–De Panne	27 March	Dylan Groenewegen (NED)	Fernando Gaviria (COL)	Elia Viviani (ITA)
(Belgium) E3 BinckBank Classic	29 March	Zdeněk Štybar (CZE)	Wout van Aert (BEL)	Greg Van Avermaet (BEL)
(Belgium) Gent–Wevelgem	31 March	Alexander Kristoff (NOR)	John Degenkolb (GER)	Oliver Naesen (BEL)
(Belgium) Dwars door Vlaanderen	3 April	Mathieu van der Poel (NED)	Anthony Turgis (FRA)	Bob Jungels (LUX)
(Belgium) Tour of Flanders	7 April	Alberto Bettiol (ITA)	Kasper Asgreen (DEN)	Alexander Kristoff (NOR)
(Spain) Tour of the Basque Country	8–13 April	Ion Izagirre (ESP)	Dan Martin (IRL)	Emanuel Buchmann (GER)
(France) Paris–Roubaix	14 April	Philippe Gilbert (BEL)	Nils Politt (GER)	Yves Lampaert (BEL)
Presidential Tour of Turkey	16–21 April	Felix Großschartner (AUT)	Valerio Conti (ITA)	Merhawi Kudus (ERI)
(Netherlands) Amstel Gold Race	21 April	Mathieu van der Poel (NED)	Simon Clarke (AUS)	Jakob Fuglsang (DEN)
(Belgium) La Flèche Wallonne	24 April	Julian Alaphilippe (FRA)	Jakob Fuglsang (DEN)	Diego Ulissi (ITA)
(Belgium) Liège–Bastogne–Liège	28 April	Jakob Fuglsang (DEN)	Davide Formolo (ITA)	Maximilian Schachmann (GER)
(Switzerland) Tour de Romandie	30 April – 5 May	Primož Roglič (SLO)	Rui Costa (POR)	Geraint Thomas (GBR)
(Germany) Eschborn–Frankfurt	1 May	Pascal Ackermann (GER)	John Degenkolb (GER)	Alexander Kristoff (NOR)
(Italy) Giro d'Italia	11 May – 2 June	Richard Carapaz (ECU)	Vincenzo Nibali (ITA)	Primož Roglič (SLO)
(United States) Tour of California	12–18 May	Tadej Pogačar (SLO)	Sergio Higuita (COL)	Kasper Asgreen (DEN)
(France) Critérium du Dauphiné	9–16 June	Jakob Fuglsang (DEN)	Tejay van Garderen (USA)	Emanuel Buchmann (GER)
(Switzerland) Tour de Suisse	15–23 June	Egan Bernal (COL)	Rohan Dennis (AUS)	Patrick Konrad (AUT)
Tour de France	6–28 July	Egan Bernal (COL)	Geraint Thomas (GBR)	Steven Kruijswijk (NED)
(Spain) Clásica de San Sebastián	3 August	Remco Evenepoel (BEL)	Greg Van Avermaet (BEL)	Marc Hirschi (SUI)
(Poland) Tour de Pologne	3–9 August	Pavel Sivakov (RUS)	Jai Hindley (AUS)	Diego Ulissi (ITA)
(United Kingdom) RideLondon–Surrey Classic	4 August	Elia Viviani (ITA)	Sam Bennett (IRL)	Michael Mørkøv (DEN)
(Belgium) / (Netherlands) BinckBank Tour	12–18 August	Laurens De Plus (BEL)	Oliver Naesen (BEL)	Tim Wellens (BEL)
(Spain) Vuelta a España	24 August – 15 September	Primož Roglič (SLO)	Alejandro Valverde (ESP)	Tadej Pogačar (SLO)
(Germany) EuroEyes Cyclassics	25 August	Elia Viviani (ITA)	Caleb Ewan (AUS)	Giacomo Nizzolo (ITA)
Bretagne Classic Ouest–France	1 September	Sep Vanmarcke (BEL)	Tiesj Benoot (BEL)	Jack Haig (AUS)
(Canada) GP de Québec	13 September	Michael Matthews (AUS)	Peter Sagan (SVK)	Greg Van Avermaet (BEL)
(Canada) GP de Montréal	15 September	Greg Van Avermaet (BEL)	Diego Ulissi (ITA)	Iván García (ESP)
(Italy) Il Lombardia	12 October	Bauke Mollema (NED)	Alejandro Valverde (ESP)	Egan Bernal (COL)
(China) Tour of Guangxi	17–22 October	Enric Mas (ESP)	Daniel Martínez (COL)	Diego Rosa (ITA)

== Teams ==
The eighteen WorldTeams were automatically invited to compete in events. Other teams were invited by the organisers of each race.

- AG2R La Mondiale
- Astana
- Bahrain–Merida
- Bora–Hansgrohe
- CCC Team
- EF Education First
- Team Dimension Data
- Groupama–FDJ
- Team INEOS
- Team Katusha–Alpecin
- Team Jumbo–Visma
- Lotto–Soudal
- Movistar Team
- Mitchelton–Scott
- Deceuninck–Quick-Step
- Team Sunweb
- Trek–Segafredo
- UAE Team Emirates
