= 2019 Paris–Nice =

Cycling race

2019 UCI World Tour, race 6 of 38
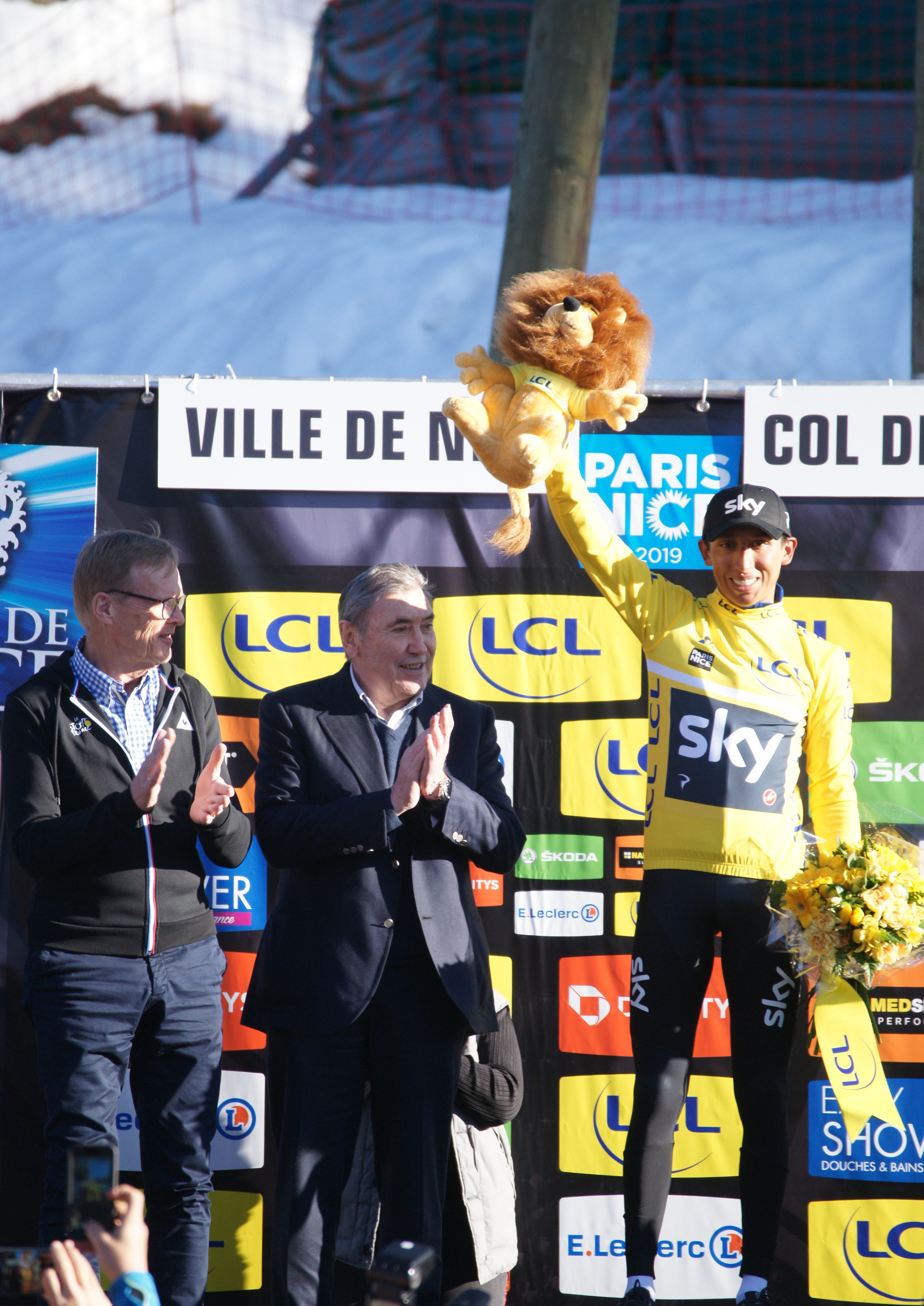
- Egan Bernal, wearing the yellow jersey of the race leader

Race details
- Dates: 10–17 March 2019
- Stages: 8
- Distance: 1,240 km (770.5 mi)
- Winning time: 29h 17' 02"

Results
Jersey awarded to the overall winner	Winner	Egan Bernal (COL)	(Team Sky)
	Second	Nairo Quintana (COL)	(Movistar Team)
	Third	Michał Kwiatkowski (POL)	(Team Sky)
Jersey awarded to the mountains classification winner	Mountains	Thomas De Gendt (BEL)	(Lotto–Soudal)
Jersey awarded to the youth classification winner	Youth	Egan Bernal (COL)	(Team Sky)
Jersey awarded to the sprints classification winner	Sprints	Michał Kwiatkowski (POL)	(Team Sky)
	Team	Team Sky	

The 2019 Paris–Nice was a road cycling stage race that was held between 10 and 17 March 2019 in France. It was the 77th edition of Paris–Nice and the sixth race of the 2019 UCI World Tour. Spaniard Marc Soler was the defending champion.

The race was won by Egan Bernal of Team Sky, making it the team's 6th win overall and 4th win in the last 5 years. Bernal also took the young rider classification. Nairo Quintana of Movistar Team finished second, with Bernal's teammate Michał Kwiatkowski rounding out the podium as well as taking the points classification. Thomas De Gendt of Lotto–Soudal took the mountains classification, and Team Sky won the team classification.

== Teams ==
The 18 UCI WorldTeams were automatically invited to the race. In addition five second-tier UCI Continental Circuits received a wildcard invitation to participate in the event. The teams entering the race will be:

UCI WorldTeams

- AG2R La Mondiale
- Astana
- Bahrain–Merida
- Bora–Hansgrohe
- CCC Team
- EF Education First
- Team Dimension Data
- Groupama–FDJ
- Team Katusha–Alpecin
- Team Jumbo–Visma
- Lotto–Soudal
- Movistar Team
- Mitchelton–Scott
- Deceuninck–Quick-Step
- Team Sky
- Team Sunweb
- Trek–Segafredo
- UAE Team Emirates

UCI Professional Continental teams

- Arkéa–Samsic
- Cofidis
- Delko–Marseille Provence
- Direct Énergie
- Vital Concept–B&B Hotels

== Route ==
The race started on 10 March 2019 in Saint-Germain-en-Laye, in the western suburbs of Paris, and finished on 17 March in Nice, covering 1,240 kilometres (770 mi) over eight stages. After four flat and hilly stages on the first four days, there was a 25.5-kilometre (15.8 mi) individual time trial on the fifth day. The seventh stage was the event's queen stage, finishing on the Col de Turini in the Alpes-Maritimes. The eighth and final stage finished on Nice's Promenade des Anglais.

Stage characteristics
Stage	Date	Course	Distance	Type	Winner
1	10 March	Saint-Germain-en-Laye to Saint-Germain-en-Laye	138.5 km (86.1 mi)	Flat stage	Dylan Groenewegen (NED)
2	11 March	Les Bréviaires to Bellegarde	163.5 km (101.6 mi)	Flat stage	Dylan Groenewegen (NED)
3	12 March	Cepoy to Moulins/Yzeure	200 km (120 mi)	Flat stage	Sam Bennett (IRL)
4	13 March	Vichy to Pélussin	210.5 km (130.8 mi)	Hilly stage	Magnus Cort (DEN)
5	14 March	Barbentane to Barbentane	25.5 km (15.8 mi)	Individual time trial	Simon Yates (GBR)
6	15 March	Peynier to Brignoles	176.5 km (109.7 mi)	Hilly stage	Sam Bennett (IRL)
7	16 March	Nice to Col de Turini La Bollène-Vésubie	181.5 km (112.8 mi)	Mountain stage	Daniel Martínez (COL)
8	17 March	Nice to Nice	110 km (68 mi)	Medium mountain stage	Ion Izagirre (ESP)

== Stages ==
=== Stage 1 ===
10 March 2019 — Saint-Germain-en-Laye to Saint-Germain-en-Laye, 138.5 km (86 mi)

Result of Stage 1
Rank	Rider	Team	Time
1	Dylan Groenewegen (NED)	Team Jumbo–Visma	3h 17' 35"
2	Caleb Ewan (AUS)	Lotto–Soudal	s.t.
3	Fabio Jakobsen (NED)	Deceuninck–Quick-Step	s.t.
4	Sam Bennett (IRL)	Bora–Hansgrohe	s.t.
5	John Degenkolb (GER)	Trek–Segafredo	s.t.
6	Matteo Trentin (ITA)	Mitchelton–Scott	s.t.
7	Arnaud Démare (FRA)	Groupama–FDJ	s.t.
8	Sonny Colbrelli (ITA)	Bahrain–Merida	s.t.
9	Bryan Coquard (FRA)	Vital Concept–B&B Hotels	s.t.
10	Anthony Turgis (FRA)	Direct Énergie	s.t.

General classification after Stage 1
Rank	Rider	Team	Time
1	Dylan Groenewegen (NED)	Team Jumbo–Visma	3h 17' 25"
2	Caleb Ewan (AUS)	Lotto–Soudal	+ 4"
3	Luis León Sánchez (ESP)	Astana	+ 5"
4	Michał Kwiatkowski (POL)	Team Sky	+ 5"
5	Fabio Jakobsen (NED)	Deceuninck–Quick-Step	+ 6"
6	Egan Bernal (COL)	Team Sky	+ 9"
7	Rudy Molard (FRA)	Groupama–FDJ	+ 9"
8	Sam Bennett (IRL)	Bora–Hansgrohe	+ 10"
9	John Degenkolb (GER)	Trek–Segafredo	+ 10"
10	Matteo Trentin (ITA)	Mitchelton–Scott	+ 10"

=== Stage 2 ===
11 March 2019 — Les Bréviaires to Bellegarde, 163.5 km (102 mi)

Result of Stage 2
Rank	Rider	Team	Time
1	Dylan Groenewegen (NED)	Team Jumbo–Visma	3h 14' 04"
2	Iván García (ESP)	Bahrain–Merida	s.t.
3	Philippe Gilbert (BEL)	Deceuninck–Quick-Step	s.t.
4	Matteo Trentin (ITA)	Mitchelton–Scott	s.t.
5	Michał Kwiatkowski (POL)	Team Sky	s.t.
6	Luis León Sánchez (ESP)	Astana	s.t.
7	Egan Bernal (COL)	Team Sky	s.t.
8	Arnaud Démare (FRA)	Groupama–FDJ	+ 5"
9	André Greipel (GER)	Arkéa–Samsic	+ 5"
10	Mike Teunissen (NED)	Team Jumbo–Visma	+ 5"

General classification after Stage 2
Rank	Rider	Team	Time
1	Dylan Groenewegen (NED)	Team Jumbo–Visma	6h 31' 19"
2	Michał Kwiatkowski (POL)	Team Sky	+ 12"
3	Luis León Sánchez (ESP)	Astana	+ 13"
4	Philippe Gilbert (BEL)	Deceuninck–Quick-Step	+ 16"
5	Egan Bernal (COL)	Team Sky	+ 19"
6	Matteo Trentin (ITA)	Mitchelton–Scott	+ 20"
7	Tony Gallopin (FRA)	AG2R La Mondiale	+ 22"
8	Rudy Molard (FRA)	Groupama–FDJ	+ 23"
9	Romain Bardet (FRA)	AG2R La Mondiale	+ 23"
10	Oliver Naesen (BEL)	AG2R La Mondiale	+ 24"

=== Stage 3 ===
12 March 2019 — Cepoy to Moulins/Yzeure, 200 km (124 mi)

Result of Stage 3
Rank	Rider	Team	Time
1	Sam Bennett (IRL)	Bora–Hansgrohe	5h 16' 25"
2	Caleb Ewan (AUS)	Lotto–Soudal	s.t.
3	Fabio Jakobsen (NED)	Deceuninck–Quick-Step	s.t.
4	Daniel McLay (GBR)	EF Education First	s.t.
5	Bryan Coquard (FRA)	Vital Concept–B&B Hotels	s.t.
6	Niccolò Bonifazio (ITA)	Bahrain–Merida	s.t.
7	Alexander Kristoff (NOR)	UAE Team Emirates	s.t.
8	Arnaud Démare (FRA)	Groupama–FDJ	s.t.
9	Dylan Groenewegen (NED)	Team Jumbo–Visma	s.t.
10	Edward Theuns (BEL)	Trek–Segafredo	s.t.

General classification after Stage 3
Rank	Rider	Team	Time
1	Dylan Groenewegen (NED)	Team Jumbo–Visma	11h 47' 44"
2	Michał Kwiatkowski (POL)	Team Sky	+ 6"
3	Luis León Sánchez (ESP)	Astana	+ 11"
4	Philippe Gilbert (BEL)	Deceuninck–Quick-Step	+ 16"
5	Egan Bernal (COL)	Team Sky	+ 19"
6	Matteo Trentin (ITA)	Mitchelton–Scott	+ 20"
7	Tony Gallopin (FRA)	AG2R La Mondiale	+ 22"
8	Rudy Molard (FRA)	Groupama–FDJ	+ 23"
9	Romain Bardet (FRA)	AG2R La Mondiale	+ 23"
10	Oliver Naesen (BEL)	AG2R La Mondiale	+ 24"

=== Stage 4 ===
13 March 2019 — Vichy to Pélussin, 212 km (132 mi)

Result of Stage 4
Rank	Rider	Team	Time
1	Magnus Cort Nielsen (DEN)	Astana	5h 03' 49"
2	Thomas De Gendt (BEL)	Lotto–Soudal	+ 7"
3	Giulio Ciccone (ITA)	Trek–Segafredo	+ 13"
4	Alessandro De Marchi (ITA)	CCC Team	+ 18"
5	Lilian Calmejane (FRA)	Direct Énergie	+ 48"
6	Valentin Madouas (FRA)	Groupama–FDJ	+ 48"
7	Sonny Colbrelli (ITA)	Bahrain–Merida	+ 48"
8	Matteo Trentin (ITA)	Mitchelton–Scott	+ 48"
9	Philippe Gilbert (BEL)	Deceuninck–Quick-Step	+ 48"
10	Michał Kwiatkowski (POL)	Team Sky	+ 48"

General classification after Stage 4
Rank	Rider	Team	Time
1	Michał Kwiatkowski (POL)	Team Sky	16h 52' 27"
2	Luis León Sánchez (ESP)	Astana	+ 5"
3	Philippe Gilbert (BEL)	Deceuninck–Quick-Step	+ 10"
4	Egan Bernal (COL)	Team Sky	+ 11"
5	Matteo Trentin (ITA)	Mitchelton–Scott	+ 14"
6	Tony Gallopin (FRA)	AG2R La Mondiale	+ 15"
7	Rudy Molard (FRA)	Groupama–FDJ	+ 17"
8	Romain Bardet (FRA)	AG2R La Mondiale	+ 17"
9	Oliver Naesen (BEL)	AG2R La Mondiale	+ 18"
10	Felix Großschartner (AUT)	Bora–Hansgrohe	+ 18"

=== Stage 5 ===
14 March 2019 — Barbentane to Barbentane, 25.2 km (16 mi) Individual time trial

Result of Stage 5
Rank	Rider	Team	Time
1	Simon Yates (GBR)	Mitchelton–Scott	30' 26"
2	Nils Politt (GER)	Team Katusha–Alpecin	+ 7"
3	Michał Kwiatkowski (POL)	Team Sky	+ 11"
4	Tejay van Garderen (USA)	EF Education First	+ 15"
5	Daniel Martínez (COL)	EF Education First	+ 15"
6	Egan Bernal (COL)	Team Sky	+ 15"
7	Lawson Craddock (USA)	EF Education First	+ 15"
8	Tom Scully (NZL)	EF Education First	+ 27"
9	Marc Soler (ESP)	Movistar Team	+ 30"
10	Luis León Sánchez (ESP)	Astana	+ 30"

General classification after Stage 5
Rank	Rider	Team	Time
1	Michał Kwiatkowski (POL)	Team Sky	17h 23' 00"
2	Egan Bernal (COL)	Team Sky	+ 15"
3	Luis León Sánchez (ESP)	Astana	+ 24"
4	Wilco Kelderman (NED)	Team Sunweb	+ 57"
5	Bob Jungels (LUX)	Deceuninck–Quick-Step	+ 57"
6	Nairo Quintana (COL)	Movistar Team	+ 1' 01"
7	Felix Großschartner (AUT)	Bora–Hansgrohe	+ 1' 05"
8	Jack Haig (AUS)	Mitchelton–Scott	+ 1' 15"
9	Rudy Molard (FRA)	Groupama–FDJ	+ 1' 18"
10	Romain Bardet (FRA)	AG2R La Mondiale	+ 1' 21"

=== Stage 6 ===
15 March 2019 — Peynier to Brignoles, 176.5 km (110 mi)

Result of Stage 6
Rank	Rider	Team	Time
1	Sam Bennett (IRL)	Bora–Hansgrohe	4h 12' 35"
2	Arnaud Démare (FRA)	Groupama–FDJ	s.t.
3	Matteo Trentin (ITA)	Mitchelton–Scott	s.t.
4	John Degenkolb (GER)	Trek–Segafredo	s.t.
5	Bryan Coquard (FRA)	Vital Concept–B&B Hotels	s.t.
6	Anthony Turgis (FRA)	Direct Énergie	s.t.
7	Florian Sénéchal (FRA)	Deceuninck–Quick-Step	s.t.
8	Oliver Naesen (BEL)	AG2R La Mondiale	s.t.
9	Alexander Kristoff (NOR)	UAE Team Emirates	s.t.
10	Egan Bernal (COL)	Team Sky	s.t.

General classification after Stage 6
Rank	Rider	Team	Time
1	Michał Kwiatkowski (POL)	Team Sky	21h 35' 36"
2	Egan Bernal (COL)	Team Sky	+ 18"
3	Luis León Sánchez (ESP)	Astana	+ 22"
4	Wilco Kelderman (NED)	Team Sunweb	+ 1' 00"
5	Bob Jungels (LUX)	Deceuninck–Quick-Step	+ 1' 00"
6	Nairo Quintana (COL)	Movistar Team	+ 1' 04"
7	Felix Großschartner (AUT)	Bora–Hansgrohe	+ 1' 08"
8	Jack Haig (AUS)	Mitchelton–Scott	+ 1' 17"
9	Rudy Molard (FRA)	Groupama–FDJ	+ 1' 21"
10	Romain Bardet (FRA)	AG2R La Mondiale	+ 1' 24"

=== Stage 7 ===
16 March 2019 — Nice to Col de Turini, 181.5 km (113 mi)

Result of Stage 7
Rank	Rider	Team	Time
1	Daniel Martínez (COL)	EF Education First	4h 55' 49"
2	Miguel Ángel López (COL)	Astana	+ 6"
3	Nicolas Edet (FRA)	Cofidis	+ 20"
4	Simon Yates (GBR)	Mitchelton–Scott	+ 20"
5	Jonathan Hivert (FRA)	Direct Énergie	+ 55"
6	Giulio Ciccone (ITA)	Trek–Segafredo	+ 2' 03"
7	Julien El Fares (FRA)	Delko–Marseille Provence	+ 2' 03"
8	Sergio Henao (COL)	UAE Team Emirates	+ 2' 08"
9	Víctor de la Parte (ESP)	CCC Team	+ 2' 13"
10	Alessandro De Marchi (ITA)	CCC Team	+ 2' 15"

General classification after Stage 7
Rank	Rider	Team	Time
1	Egan Bernal (COL)	Team Sky	21h 35' 36"
2	Philippe Gilbert (BEL)	Deceuninck–Quick-Step	+ 45"
3	Nairo Quintana (COL)	Movistar Team	+ 46"
4	Michał Kwiatkowski (POL)	Team Sky	+ 1' 03"
5	Jack Haig (AUS)	Mitchelton–Scott	+ 1' 21"
6	Romain Bardet (FRA)	AG2R La Mondiale	+ 1' 45"
7	George Bennett (NZL)	Team Jumbo–Visma	+ 2' 20"
8	Ilnur Zakarin (RUS)	Team Katusha–Alpecin	+ 2' 52"
9	Rudy Molard (FRA)	Groupama–FDJ	+ 3' 02"
10	Bob Jungels (LUX)	Deceuninck–Quick-Step	+ 3' 06"

=== Stage 8 ===
17 March 2019 — Nice to Nice, 110 km (68 mi)

Result of Stage 8
Rank	Rider	Team	Time
1	Ion Izagirre (ESP)	Astana	2h 41' 10"
2	Oliver Naesen (BEL)	AG2R La Mondiale	+ 18"
3	Wilco Kelderman (NED)	Team Sunweb	+ 18"
4	Daniel Martínez (COL)	EF Education First	+ 18"
5	Felix Großschartner (AUT)	Bora–Hansgrohe	+ 18"
6	Domenico Pozzovivo (ITA)	Bahrain–Merida	+ 18"
7	Luis León Sánchez (ESP)	Astana	+ 18"
8	Simon Yates (GBR)	Mitchelton–Scott	+ 20"
9	Tejay van Garderen (USA)	EF Education First	+ 20"
10	Nairo Quintana (COL)	Movistar Team	+ 22"

Final general classification
Rank	Rider	Team	Time
1	Egan Bernal (COL)	Team Sky	21h 35' 36"
2	Nairo Quintana (COL)	Movistar Team	+ 39"
3	Michał Kwiatkowski (POL)	Team Sky	+ 1' 03"
4	Jack Haig (AUS)	Mitchelton–Scott	+ 1' 21"
5	Romain Bardet (FRA)	AG2R La Mondiale	+ 1' 45"
6	George Bennett (NZL)	Team Jumbo–Visma	+ 2' 20"
7	Rudy Molard (FRA)	Groupama–FDJ	+ 3' 02"
8	Bob Jungels (LUX)	Deceuninck–Quick-Step	+ 3' 06"
9	Luis León Sánchez (ESP)	Astana	+ 3' 12"
10	Ilnur Zakarin (RUS)	Team Katusha–Alpecin	+ 4' 07"

== Classification leadership table ==
In the 2019 Paris–Nice, four jerseys were awarded. The general classification was calculated by adding each cyclist's finishing times on each stage. Time bonuses were awarded to the first three finishers on all stages except for the individual time trial: the stage winner won a ten-second bonus, with six and four seconds for the second and third riders respectively. Bonus seconds were also awarded to the first three riders at intermediate sprints – three seconds for the winner of the sprint, two seconds for the rider in second and one second for the rider in third. The leader of the general classification received a yellow jersey. This classification was considered the most important of the 2019 Paris–Nice, and the winner of the classification was considered the winner of the race.

Points for stage victory
Position	1	2	3	4	5	6	7	8	9	10
Points awarded	15	12	9	7	6	5	4	3	2	1

The second classification was the points classification. Riders were awarded points for finishing in the top ten in a stage. Unlike in the points classification in the Tour de France, the winners of all stages were awarded the same number of points. Points were also won in intermediate sprints; three points for crossing the sprint line first, two points for second place, and one for third. The leader of the points classification was awarded a green jersey.

Points for the mountains classification
Position	1	2	3	4	5	6	7
Points for Category 1	10	8	6	4	3	2	1
Points for Category 2	7	5	3	2	1	0	
Points for Category 3	4	2	1	0			

There was also a mountains classification, for which points were awarded for reaching the top of a climb before other riders. Each climb was categorised as either first, second, or third-category, with more points available for the more difficult, higher-categorised climbs. For first-category climbs, the top seven riders earned points; on second-category climbs, five riders won points; on third-category climbs, only the top three riders earned points. The leadership of the mountains classification was marked by a white jersey with red polka-dots.

The fourth jersey represented the young rider classification, marked by a white jersey. Only riders born after 1 January 1994 were eligible; the young rider best placed in the general classification was the leader of the young rider classification. There was also a classification for teams, in which the times of the best three cyclists in a team on each stage were added together; the leading team at the end of the race was the team with the lowest cumulative time.

Stage	Winner	General classification	Points classification	Mountains classification	Young rider classification	Teams classification
1	Dylan Groenewegen	Dylan Groenewegen	Dylan Groenewegen	Damien Gaudin	Caleb Ewan	Bora–Hansgrohe
2	Dylan Groenewegen	Dylan Groenewegen	Dylan Groenewegen	Damien Gaudin	Egan Bernal	Team Jumbo–Visma
3	Sam Bennett	Dylan Groenewegen	Dylan Groenewegen	Damien Gaudin	Egan Bernal	Team Jumbo–Visma
4	Magnus Cort	Michał Kwiatkowski	Dylan Groenewegen	Thomas De Gendt	Egan Bernal	Astana
5	Simon Yates	Michał Kwiatkowski	Dylan Groenewegen	Thomas De Gendt	Egan Bernal	EF Education First
6	Sam Bennett	Michał Kwiatkowski	Dylan Groenewegen	Thomas De Gendt	Egan Bernal	Team Sky
7	Daniel Martínez	Egan Bernal	Michał Kwiatkowski	Thomas De Gendt	Egan Bernal	Team Sky
8	Ion Izagirre	Egan Bernal	Michał Kwiatkowski	Thomas De Gendt	Egan Bernal	Team Sky
Final		Egan Bernal	Michał Kwiatkowski	Thomas De Gendt	Egan Bernal	Team Sky

== Final classification standings ==
Legend
Denotes the winner of the general classification	Denotes the winner of the mountains classification
Denotes the winner of the points classification	Denotes the winner of the young rider classification

=== General classification ===
Final general classification
Rank	Rider	Team	Time
1	Egan Bernal (COL)	Team Sky	21h 35' 36"
2	Nairo Quintana (COL)	Movistar Team	+ 39"
3	Michał Kwiatkowski (POL)	Team Sky	+ 1' 03"
4	Jack Haig (AUS)	Mitchelton–Scott	+ 1' 21"
5	Romain Bardet (FRA)	AG2R La Mondiale	+ 1' 45"
6	George Bennett (NZL)	Team Jumbo–Visma	+ 2' 20"
7	Rudy Molard (FRA)	Groupama–FDJ	+ 3' 02"
8	Bob Jungels (LUX)	Deceuninck–Quick-Step	+ 3' 06"
9	Luis León Sánchez (ESP)	Astana	+ 3' 12"
10	Ilnur Zakarin (RUS)	Team Katusha–Alpecin	+ 4' 07"

=== Points classification ===
Final points classification
Rank	Rider	Team	Points
1	Michał Kwiatkowski (POL)	Team Sky	33
2	Daniel Martínez (COL)	EF Education First	28
3	Simon Yates (GBR)	Mitchelton–Scott	25
4	Luis León Sánchez (ESP)	Astana	24
5	Matteo Trentin (ITA)	Mitchelton–Scott	24
6	Arnaud Démare (FRA)	Groupama–FDJ	22
7	Magnus Cort (DEN)	Astana	18
8	Ion Izagirre (ESP)	Astana	18
9	Philippe Gilbert (BEL)	Deceuninck–Quick-Step	16
10	Oliver Naesen (BEL)	AG2R La Mondiale	16

=== Mountains classification ===
Final mountains classification
Rank	Rider	Team	Points
1	Thomas De Gendt (BEL)	Lotto–Soudal	76
2	Alessandro De Marchi (ITA)	CCC Team	43
3	Nairo Quintana (COL)	Movistar Team	25
4	Matteo Trentin (ITA)	Mitchelton–Scott	16
5	Ion Izagirre (ESP)	Astana	16
6	Tejay van Garderen (USA)	EF Education First	16
7	Miguel Ángel López (COL)	Astana	15
8	Daniel Martínez (COL)	EF Education First	14
9	Luis León Sánchez (ESP)	Astana	12
10	Giulio Ciccone (ITA)	Trek–Segafredo	12

=== Young rider classification ===
Final young rider classification
Rank	Rider	Team	Time
1	Egan Bernal (COL)	Team Sky	21h 35' 36"
2	Valentin Madouas (FRA)	Groupama–FDJ	+ 4' 07"
3	Daniel Martínez (COL)	EF Education First	+ 9' 27"
4	Miguel Ángel López (COL)	Astana	+ 23' 44"
5	Tao Geoghegan Hart (GBR)	Team Sky	+ 26' 23"
6	Giulio Ciccone (ITA)	Trek–Segafredo	+ 30' 21"
7	Élie Gesbert (FRA)	Arkéa–Samsic	+ 30' 24"
8	Iván Sosa (COL)	Team Sky	+ 31' 57"
9	Iván García (ESP)	Bahrain–Merida	+ 36' 47"
10	Nils Politt (GER)	Team Katusha–Alpecin	+ 37' 22"

=== Teams classification ===
Final teams classification
Rank	Team	Time
1	Team Sky	87h 57' 51"
2	Astana	+ 9' 46"
3	AG2R La Mondiale	+ 10' 25"
4	Mitchelton–Scott	+ 15' 27"
5	Bahrain–Merida	+ 17' 18"
6	Movistar Team	+ 33' 16"
7	Direct Énergie	+ 40' 19"
8	Groupama–FDJ	+ 41' 41"
9	Trek–Segafredo	+ 42' 18"
10	Deceuninck–Quick-Step	+ 43' 46"
