= 2019 Tour du Haut Var =

2019 UCI Europe Tour

Race details
- Dates: 22–24 February 2019
- Stages: 3
- Distance: 491.9 km (305.7 mi)

Results
Jersey awarded to the overall winner	Winner	Thibaut Pinot (FRA)	(Groupama–FDJ)
	Second	Romain Bardet (FRA)	(AG2R La Mondiale)
	Third	Hugh Carthy (GBR)	(EF Education First)
Jersey awarded to the points classification winner	Points	Thibaut Pinot (FRA)	(Groupama–FDJ)
Jersey awarded to the mountains classification winner	Mountains	Cyril Gautier (FRA)	(Vital Concept–B&B Hotels)
Jersey awarded to the youth classification winner	Youth	Mathias Le Turnier (FRA)	(Cofidis)
	Team	Groupama–FDJ	

The 2019 Tour du Haut Var was a road cycling stage race that took place from 22 to 24 February 2019. The race was rated as a 2.1 event as part of the 2019 UCI Europe Tour, and was the 51st edition of the Tour du Haut Var.

== Teams ==
Eighteen teams were invited to start the race. These included four UCI WorldTeams, six UCI Professional Continental teams and seven UCI Continental teams.

UCI WorldTeams

- AG2R La Mondiale
- EF Education First
- Groupama–FDJ
- Trek–Segafredo

UCI Professional Continental teams

- Androni Giocattoli–Sidermec
- Arkéa–Samsic
- Burgos BH
- Cofidis
- Delko–Marseille Provence
- Euskadi–Murias
- Israel Cycling Academy
- Riwal Readynez
- Vital Concept–B&B Hotels
- Wallonie Bruxelles
- Direct Énergie

UCI Continental teams

- Sovac Algérie
- Natura4Ever–Roubaix–Lille Métropole
- St. Michel–Auber93

== Route ==
Stage schedule
Stage	Date	Route	Distance	Type	Winner
1	22 February	Vence to Mandelieu-la-Napoule	154.5 km (96 mi)	Hilly stage	Sep Vanmarcke (BEL)
2	23 February	Le Cannet-des-Maures to Mons	201.4 km (125 mi)	Hilly stage	Giulio Ciccone (ITA)
3	24 February	La Londe-les-Maures to Mont Faron	136 km (85 mi)	Hilly stage	Thibaut Pinot (FRA)

== Stages ==
=== Stage 1 ===
22 February 2019 — Vence to Mandelieu-la-Napoule, 154.5 km (96 mi)

Result of Stage 1 & General classification after Stage 1
Rank	Rider	Team	Time
1	Sep Vanmarcke (BEL)	EF Education First	4h 00' 22"
2	Julien El Fares (FRA)	Delko–Marseille Provence	+ 0"
3	Giulio Ciccone (ITA)	Trek–Segafredo	+ 0"
4	Rudy Molard (FRA)	Groupama–FDJ	+ 0"
5	Alexis Vuillermoz (FRA)	AG2R La Mondiale	+ 0"
6	Lucas Eriksson (SWE)	Riwal Readynez	+ 0"
7	Krists Neilands (LAT)	Israel Cycling Academy	+ 0"
8	Thibaut Pinot (FRA)	Groupama–FDJ	+ 0"
9	Miguel Flórez (COL)	Androni Giocattoli–Sidermec	+ 0"
10	Dimitri Peyskens (BEL)	Wallonie Bruxelles	+ 0"

=== Stage 2 ===
23 February 2019 — Le Cannet-des-Maures to Mons, 201.4 km (125 mi)

Result of Stage 2
Rank	Rider	Team	Time
1	Giulio Ciccone (ITA)	Trek–Segafredo	5h 19' 30"
2	Thibaut Pinot (FRA)	Groupama–FDJ	+ 0"
3	Romain Bardet (FRA)	AG2R La Mondiale	+ 0"
4	Lilian Calmejane (FRA)	Direct Énergie	+ 0"
5	Alexis Vuillermoz (FRA)	AG2R La Mondiale	+ 0"
6	Julien El Fares (FRA)	Delko–Marseille Provence	+ 0"
7	Nicolas Edet (FRA)	Cofidis	+ 0"
8	Hugh Carthy (GBR)	EF Education First	+ 0"
9	Kilian Frankiny (SUI)	Groupama–FDJ	+ 0"
10	Romain Combaud (FRA)	Delko–Marseille Provence	+ 10"

General classification after stage 2
Rank	Rider	Team	Time
1	Giulio Ciccone (ITA)	Trek–Segafredo	9h 19' 42"
2	Julien El Fares (FRA)	Delko–Marseille Provence	+ 0"
3	Thibaut Pinot (FRA)	Groupama–FDJ	+ 0"
4	Alexis Vuillermoz (FRA)	AG2R La Mondiale	+ 0"
5	Romain Bardet (FRA)	AG2R La Mondiale	+ 0"
6	Nicolas Edet (FRA)	Cofidis	+ 0"
7	Hugh Carthy (GBR)	EF Education First	+ 0"
8	Rudy Molard (FRA)	Groupama–FDJ	+ 10"
9	Kilian Frankiny (SUI)	Groupama–FDJ	+ 14"
10	Mathias Le Turnier (FRA)	Cofidis	+ 45"

=== Stage 3 ===
24 February 2019 — La Londe-les-Maures to Mont Faron, 136 km (85 mi)

Result of Stage 3
Rank	Rider	Team	Time
1	Thibaut Pinot (FRA)	Groupama–FDJ	3h 19' 52"
2	Romain Bardet (FRA)	AG2R La Mondiale	+ 3"
3	Hugh Carthy (GBR)	EF Education First	+ 5"
4	Lilian Calmejane (FRA)	Direct Énergie	+ 11"
5	Alexis Vuillermoz (FRA)	AG2R La Mondiale	+ 11"
6	Kilian Frankiny (SUI)	Groupama–FDJ	+ 13"
7	Nicolas Edet (FRA)	Cofidis	+ 13"
8	Alexandre Geniez (FRA)	AG2R La Mondiale	+ 51"
9	Julien El Fares (FRA)	Delko–Marseille Provence	+ 51"
10	Nans Peters (FRA)	AG2R La Mondiale	+ 56"

Final general classification
Rank	Rider	Team	Time
1	Thibaut Pinot (FRA)	Groupama–FDJ	12h 39' 44"
2	Romain Bardet (FRA)	AG2R La Mondiale	+ 3"
3	Hugh Carthy (GBR)	EF Education First	+ 5"
4	Alexis Vuillermoz (FRA)	AG2R La Mondiale	+ 11"
5	Nicolas Edet (FRA)	Cofidis	+ 13"
6	Kilian Frankiny (SUI)	Groupama–FDJ	+ 27"
7	Julien El Fares (FRA)	Delko–Marseille Provence	+ 51"
8	Giulio Ciccone (ITA)	Trek–Segafredo	+ 1' 14"
9	Rudy Molard (FRA)	Groupama–FDJ	+ 1' 54"
10	Mathias Le Turnier (FRA)	Cofidis	+ 2' 10"

== Classification leadership table ==
In the 2019 Tour du Haut Var, four different jerseys were awarded. For the general classification, calculated by adding each cyclist's finishing times on each stage, the leader received a yellow jersey. This classification was considered the most important of the 2019 Tour du Haut Var, and the winner of the classification was considered the winner of the race.

Additionally, there was a points classification, which awarded a green jersey. In the points classification, cyclists received points for finishing in the top 15 in a mass-start stage. For winning a stage, a rider earned 25 points, with 20 for second, 16 for third, 14 for fourth, 12 for fifth, 10 for sixth, then 1 point fewer per place down to 1 for 15th place. Points towards the classification could also be accrued at intermediate sprint points during each stage. There was also a mountains classification, the leadership of which was marked by a red jersey. In the mountains classification, points were won by reaching the top of a climb before other cyclists, with more points available for the higher-categorised climbs.

The fourth jersey represented the young rider classification, marked by a white jersey. This was decided in the same way as the general classification, but only riders born after 1 January 1995 were eligible to be ranked in the classification. There was also a classification for teams, in which the times of the best three cyclists per team on each stage were added together; the leading team at the end of the race was the team with the lowest total time.

Stage	Winner	General classification	Mountains classification	Points classification	Young rider classification	Team classification
1	Sep Vanmarcke	Sep Vanmarcke	Julien Bernard	Sep Vanmarcke	Lucas Eriksson	Groupama–FDJ
2	Giulio Ciccone	Giulio Ciccone	Cyril Gautier	Giulio Ciccone	Mathias Le Turnier	Groupama–FDJ
3	Thibaut Pinot	Thibaut Pinot	Cyril Gautier	Thibaut Pinot	Mathias Le Turnier	Groupama–FDJ
Final		Thibaut Pinot	Cyril Gautier	Thibaut Pinot	Mathias Le Turnier	Groupama–FDJ
