= 2018 Grand Prix La Marseillaise =

Bicycle race

- 2018 UCI Europe Tour

Race details
- Dates: 28 January 2018
- Stages: 1
- Distance: 145.3 km (90.29 mi)
- Winning time: 3h 47' 21"

Results
	Winner	Alexandre Geniez (FRA)	(AG2R La Mondiale)
	Second	Odd Christian Eiking (NOR)	(Wanty–Groupe Gobert)
	Third	Lilian Calmejane (FRA)	(Direct Énergie)

The 2018 GP La Marseillaise was the 39th edition of the Grand Prix La Marseillaise cycle race and was held on 28 January 2018. The race started and finished in Marseille. The race was won by Alexandre Geniez.

== Teams ==
Sixteen teams were invited to take part in the race. These included two UCI WorldTeams, ten UCI Professional Continental teams and four UCI Continental teams.

UCI WorldTeams

- AG2R La Mondiale
- Groupama–FDJ

UCI Professional Continental Teams

- Cofidis
- Delko–Marseille Provence KTM
- Direct Énergie
- Fortuneo–Samsic
- Sport Vlaanderen–Baloise
- Vital Concept
- Vérandas Willems–Crelan
- Wanty–Groupe Gobert
- WB Aqua Protect Veranclassic
- Euskadi–Murias

UCI Continental Teams

- Amore & Vita–Prodir
- St. Michel–Auber93
- Cibel–Cebon
- Roubaix–Lille Métropole

== General classification ==
Result
Rank	Rider	Team	Time
1	Alexandre Geniez (FRA)	AG2R La Mondiale	3h 47' 21"
2	Odd Christian Eiking (NOR)	Wanty–Groupe Gobert	+ 0"
3	Lilian Calmejane (FRA)	Direct Énergie	+ 0"
4	Jesús Herrada (ESP)	Cofidis	+ 0"
5	Guillaume Martin (FRA)	Wanty–Groupe Gobert	+ 2"
6	Rémy Di Gregorio (FRA)	Delko–Marseille Provence KTM	+ 3"
7	Valentin Madouas (FRA)	Groupama–FDJ	+ 4"
8	Romain Bardet (FRA)	AG2R La Mondiale	+ 4"
9	Tony Gallopin (FRA)	AG2R La Mondiale	+ 13"
10	Dimitri Claeys (BEL)	Cofidis	+ 1'52"
