= 2018 Paris–Nice =

Cycling race

2018 UCI World Tour, race 6 of 37

Race details
- Dates: 4–11 March 2018
- Stages: 8
- Distance: 1,198.9 km (745.0 mi)
- Winning time: 30h 22' 41"

Results
Jersey awarded to the overall winner	Winner	Marc Soler (ESP)	(Movistar Team)
	Second	Simon Yates (GBR)	(Mitchelton–Scott)
	Third	Gorka Izagirre (ESP)	(Bahrain–Merida)
Jersey awarded to the points classification winner	Points	Tim Wellens (BEL)	(Lotto–Soudal)
Jersey awarded to the mountains classification winner	Mountains	Thomas De Gendt (BEL)	(Lotto–Soudal)
Jersey awarded to the youth classification winner	Youth	Marc Soler (ESP)	(Movistar Team)
	Team	Bahrain–Merida	

The 2018 Paris–Nice was a road cycling stage race that took place between 4 and 11 March 2018 in France. It was the 76th edition of the Paris–Nice and the sixth event of the 2018 UCI World Tour.

The race was won on the final day by the Movistar Team's Marc Soler from Spain. Having started the final stage 37 seconds down on race leader Simon Yates (Mitchelton–Scott) in sixth place overall, Soler attacked around halfway into the stage along with compatriot David de la Cruz (Team Sky); the duo joined Omar Fraile (Astana) at the head of the race, and the trio managed to stay clear of the rest of the field by the time they reached Nice. As de la Cruz and Fraile contested stage honours, Soler finished third – acquiring four bonus seconds on the finish in addition to three gained at an earlier intermediate sprint – and with a 35-second gap to Yates and the remaining general classification contenders, it was enough to give Soler victory over Yates by four seconds. The podium was completed by Bahrain–Merida's Gorka Izagirre, moving ahead of teammate and brother Ion Izagirre due to bonus seconds won on the final day, 14 seconds behind Soler, who also won the white jersey as best young rider.

Lotto–Soudal won the two other jerseys on offer in the race; Tim Wellens won the green jersey for the points classification, taking five top-ten finishes over the course of the week, while Thomas De Gendt was the winner of the mountains classification. With the performances of the Izagirre brothers, Bahrain–Merida were the winners of the teams classification.

== Teams ==
As Paris–Nice is a UCI World Tour event, all eighteen UCI WorldTeams were invited automatically and obliged to enter a team in the race. Four UCI Professional Continental teams competed, completing the 22-team peloton. Paris–Nice is the first race for Groupama–FDJ under this nomenclature, as French insurance company Groupama signed a co-naming sponsorship deal with the team.

UCI WorldTeams

- AG2R La Mondiale
- Astana
- Bahrain–Merida
- BMC Racing Team
- Bora–Hansgrohe
- EF Education First–Drapac p/b Cannondale
- Team Dimension Data
- Team Katusha–Alpecin
- LottoNL–Jumbo
- Lotto–Soudal
- Movistar Team
- Mitchelton–Scott
- Quick-Step Floors
- Team Sky
- Team Sunweb
- Trek–Segafredo
- UAE Team Emirates
- Groupama–FDJ

UCI Professional Continental teams

- Cofidis
- Delko–Marseille Provence KTM
- Direct Énergie
- Fortuneo–Samsic

== Route ==
The route of the 2018 Paris–Nice was announced on 9 January 2018.

Stage schedule
Stage	Date	Route	Distance	Type	Winner
1	4 March	Chatou to Meudon	135 km (84 mi)	Hilly stage	Arnaud Démare (FRA)
2	5 March	Orsonville to Vierzon	187.5 km (117 mi)	Flat stage	Dylan Groenewegen (NLD)
3	6 March	Bourges to Châtel-Guyon	210 km (130 mi)	Hilly stage	Jonathan Hivert (FRA)
4	7 March	La Fouillouse to Saint-Étienne	18.4 km (11 mi)	Individual time trial	Wout Poels (NED)
5	8 March	Salon-de-Provence to Sisteron	165 km (103 mi)	Flat stage	Jérôme Cousin (FRA)
6	9 March	Sisteron to Vence	198 km (123 mi)	Medium-mountain stage	Rudy Molard (FRA)
7	10 March	Nice to Valdeblore La Colmiane	175 km (109 mi)	Mountain stage	Simon Yates (GBR)
8	11 March	Nice to Nice	110 km (68 mi)	Medium-mountain stage	David de la Cruz (ESP)

== Stages ==
=== Stage 1 ===
4 March 2018 — Chatou to Meudon, 135 km (84 mi)

Result of Stage 1
Rank	Rider	Team	Time
1	Arnaud Démare (FRA)	Groupama–FDJ	3h 07' 39"
2	Gorka Izagirre (ESP)	Bahrain–Merida	+ 0"
3	Christophe Laporte (FRA)	Cofidis	+ 0"
4	Tim Wellens (BEL)	Lotto–Soudal	+ 0"
5	Mike Teunissen (NED)	Team Sunweb	+ 0"
6	Julian Alaphilippe (FRA)	Quick-Step Floors	+ 0"
7	Patrick Konrad (AUT)	Bora–Hansgrohe	+ 2"
8	Dylan Teuns (BEL)	BMC Racing Team	+ 2"
9	Matteo Trentin (ITA)	Mitchelton–Scott	+ 2"
10	Ion Izagirre (ESP)	Bahrain–Merida	+ 2"

General classification after Stage 1
Rank	Rider	Team	Time
1	Arnaud Démare (FRA)	Groupama–FDJ	3h 07' 29"
2	Gorka Izagirre (ESP)	Bahrain–Merida	+ 4"
3	Christophe Laporte (FRA)	Cofidis	+ 6"
4	Tim Wellens (BEL)	Lotto–Soudal	+ 10"
5	Mike Teunissen (NED)	Team Sunweb	+ 10"
6	Julian Alaphilippe (FRA)	Quick-Step Floors	+ 10"
7	Patrick Konrad (AUT)	Bora–Hansgrohe	+ 12"
8	Dylan Teuns (BEL)	BMC Racing Team	+ 12"
9	Matteo Trentin (ITA)	Mitchelton–Scott	+ 12"
10	Ion Izagirre (ESP)	Bahrain–Merida	+ 12"

=== Stage 2 ===
5 March 2018 — Orsonville to Vierzon, 187.5 km (117 mi)

Result of Stage 2
Rank	Rider	Team	Time
1	Dylan Groenewegen (NED)	LottoNL–Jumbo	4h 51' 31"
2	Elia Viviani (ITA)	Quick-Step Floors	+ 0"
3	André Greipel (GER)	Lotto–Soudal	+ 0"
4	Phil Bauhaus (GER)	Team Sunweb	+ 0"
5	Arnaud Démare (FRA)	Groupama–FDJ	+ 0"
6	Mike Teunissen (NED)	Team Sunweb	+ 0"
7	Alexander Kristoff (NOR)	UAE Team Emirates	+ 0"
8	Jempy Drucker (LUX)	BMC Racing Team	+ 0"
9	John Degenkolb (GER)	Trek–Segafredo	+ 0"
10	Iván García (ESP)	Bahrain–Merida	+ 0"

General classification after Stage 2
Rank	Rider	Team	Time
1	Arnaud Démare (FRA)	Groupama–FDJ	7h 58' 57"
2	Gorka Izagirre (ESP)	Bahrain–Merida	+ 7"
3	Christophe Laporte (FRA)	Cofidis	+ 8"
4	Julian Alaphilippe (FRA)	Quick-Step Floors	+ 10"
5	Mike Teunissen (NED)	Team Sunweb	+ 13"
6	Tim Wellens (BEL)	Lotto–Soudal	+ 13"
7	Tony Gallopin (FRA)	AG2R La Mondiale	+ 15"
8	Esteban Chaves (COL)	Mitchelton–Scott	+ 15"
9	Ion Izagirre (ESP)	Bahrain–Merida	+ 15"
10	Heinrich Haussler (AUS)	Bahrain–Merida	+ 15"

=== Stage 3 ===
6 March 2018 — Bourges to Châtel-Guyon, 210 km (130 mi)

Result of Stage 3
Rank	Rider	Team	Time
1	Jonathan Hivert (FRA)	Direct Énergie	5h 22' 49"
2	Luis León Sánchez (ESP)	Astana	+ 1"
3	Rémy Di Gregorio (FRA)	Delko–Marseille Provence KTM	+ 1"
4	Arnaud Démare (FRA)	Groupama–FDJ	+ 38"
5	Mike Teunissen (NED)	Team Sunweb	+ 38"
6	André Greipel (GER)	Lotto–Soudal	+ 38"
7	Magnus Cort (DEN)	Astana	+ 38"
8	Matteo Trentin (ITA)	Mitchelton–Scott	+ 38"
9	Julian Alaphilippe (FRA)	Quick-Step Floors	+ 38"
10	Felix Großschartner (AUT)	Bora–Hansgrohe	+ 38"

General classification after Stage 3
Rank	Rider	Team	Time
1	Luis León Sánchez (ESP)	Astana	13h 21' 56"
2	Arnaud Démare (FRA)	Groupama–FDJ	+ 28"
3	Gorka Izagirre (ESP)	Bahrain–Merida	+ 35"
4	Julian Alaphilippe (FRA)	Quick-Step Floors	+ 38"
5	Mike Teunissen (NED)	Team Sunweb	+ 41"
6	Tim Wellens (BEL)	Lotto–Soudal	+ 41"
7	Roman Kreuziger (CZE)	Mitchelton–Scott	+ 41"
8	Heinrich Haussler (AUS)	Bahrain–Merida	+ 43"
9	Felix Großschartner (AUT)	Bora–Hansgrohe	+ 43"
10	Ion Izagirre (ESP)	Bahrain–Merida	+ 43"

=== Stage 4 ===
7 March 2018 — La Fouillouse to Saint-Étienne, 18.4 km (11 mi), individual time trial (ITT)

Result of Stage 4
Rank	Rider	Team	Time
1	Wout Poels (NED)	Team Sky	25' 33"
2	Marc Soler (ESP)	Movistar Team	+ 11"
3	Julian Alaphilippe (FRA)	Quick-Step Floors	+ 16"
4	Felix Großschartner (AUT)	Bora–Hansgrohe	+ 20"
5	Ion Izagirre (ESP)	Bahrain–Merida	+ 27"
6	Gorka Izagirre (ESP)	Bahrain–Merida	+ 27"
7	Luis León Sánchez (ESP)	Astana	+ 28"
8	Tim Wellens (BEL)	Lotto–Soudal	+ 29"
9	Sergio Henao (COL)	Team Sky	+ 33"
10	Esteban Chaves (COL)	Mitchelton–Scott	+ 33"

General classification after Stage 4
Rank	Rider	Team	Time
1	Luis León Sánchez (ESP)	Astana	13h 47' 57"
2	Wout Poels (NED)	Team Sky	+ 15"
3	Julian Alaphilippe (FRA)	Quick-Step Floors	+ 26"
4	Marc Soler (ESP)	Movistar Team	+ 26"
5	Gorka Izagirre (ESP)	Bahrain–Merida	+ 34"
6	Felix Großschartner (AUT)	Bora–Hansgrohe	+ 35"
7	Ion Izagirre (ESP)	Bahrain–Merida	+ 42"
8	Tim Wellens (BEL)	Lotto–Soudal	+ 42"
9	Sergio Henao (COL)	Team Sky	+ 48"
10	Esteban Chaves (COL)	Mitchelton–Scott	+ 48"

=== Stage 5 ===
8 March 2018 — Salon-de-Provence to Sisteron, 165 km (103 mi)

Result of Stage 5
Rank	Rider	Team	Time
1	Jérôme Cousin (FRA)	Direct Énergie	3h 57' 25"
2	Nils Politt (GER)	Team Katusha–Alpecin	+ 2"
3	André Greipel (GER)	Lotto–Soudal	+ 4"
4	Magnus Cort (DEN)	Astana	+ 4"
5	Alexander Kristoff (NOR)	UAE Team Emirates	+ 4"
6	Christophe Laporte (FRA)	Cofidis	+ 4"
7	Matteo Trentin (ITA)	Mitchelton–Scott	+ 4"
8	Mike Teunissen (NED)	Team Sunweb	+ 4"
9	Matti Breschel (DEN)	EF Education First–Drapac p/b Cannondale	+ 4"
10	Koen de Kort (NED)	Trek–Segafredo	+ 4"

General classification after Stage 5
Rank	Rider	Team	Time
1	Luis León Sánchez (ESP)	Astana	17h 45' 26"
2	Wout Poels (NED)	Team Sky	+ 15"
3	Julian Alaphilippe (FRA)	Quick-Step Floors	+ 26"
4	Marc Soler (ESP)	Movistar Team	+ 26"
5	Gorka Izagirre (ESP)	Bahrain–Merida	+ 34"
6	Felix Großschartner (AUT)	Bora–Hansgrohe	+ 35"
7	Ion Izagirre (ESP)	Bahrain–Merida	+ 42"
8	Tim Wellens (BEL)	Lotto–Soudal	+ 42"
9	Sergio Henao (COL)	Team Sky	+ 48"
10	Esteban Chaves (COL)	Mitchelton–Scott	+ 48"

=== Stage 6 ===
9 March 2018 — Sisteron to Vence, 198 km (123 mi)

Result of Stage 6
Rank	Rider	Team	Time
1	Rudy Molard (FRA)	Groupama–FDJ	4h 40' 05"
2	Tim Wellens (BEL)	Lotto–Soudal	+ 2"
3	Julian Alaphilippe (FRA)	Quick-Step Floors	+ 2"
4	Luis León Sánchez (ESP)	Astana	+ 2"
5	Sam Oomen (NED)	Team Sunweb	+ 2"
6	Dylan Teuns (BEL)	BMC Racing Team	+ 2"
7	Patrick Konrad (AUT)	Bora–Hansgrohe	+ 2"
8	Esteban Chaves (COL)	Mitchelton–Scott	+ 2"
9	Gorka Izagirre (ESP)	Bahrain–Merida	+ 2"
10	Sergio Henao (COL)	Team Sky	+ 2"

General classification after Stage 6
Rank	Rider	Team	Time
1	Luis León Sánchez (ESP)	Astana	22h 25' 33"
2	Julian Alaphilippe (FRA)	Quick-Step Floors	+ 22"
3	Marc Soler (ESP)	Movistar Team	+ 26"
4	Gorka Izagirre (ESP)	Bahrain–Merida	+ 34"
5	Tim Wellens (BEL)	Lotto–Soudal	+ 35"
6	Ion Izagirre (ESP)	Bahrain–Merida	+ 42"
7	Simon Yates (GBR)	Mitchelton–Scott	+ 45"
8	Sergio Henao (COL)	Team Sky	+ 46"
9	Esteban Chaves (COL)	Mitchelton–Scott	+ 48"
10	Patrick Konrad (AUT)	Bora–Hansgrohe	+ 54"

=== Stage 7 ===
10 March 2018 — Nice to Valdeblore La Colmiane, 175 km (109 mi)

Result of Stage 7
Rank	Rider	Team	Time
1	Simon Yates (GBR)	Mitchelton–Scott	5h 02' 54"
2	Dylan Teuns (BEL)	BMC Racing Team	+ 8"
3	Ion Izagirre (ESP)	Bahrain–Merida	+ 8"
4	Gorka Izagirre (ESP)	Bahrain–Merida	+ 13"
5	Tim Wellens (BEL)	Lotto–Soudal	+ 13"
6	Patrick Konrad (AUT)	Bora–Hansgrohe	+ 20"
7	Sergio Henao (COL)	Team Sky	+ 46"
8	Marc Soler (ESP)	Movistar Team	+ 46"
9	Jakob Fuglsang (DEN)	Astana	+ 48"
10	Sam Oomen (NED)	Team Sunweb	+ 54"

General classification after Stage 7
Rank	Rider	Team	Time
1	Simon Yates (GBR)	Mitchelton–Scott	27h 29' 02"
2	Ion Izagirre (ESP)	Bahrain–Merida	+ 11"
3	Gorka Izagirre (ESP)	Bahrain–Merida	+ 12"
4	Tim Wellens (BEL)	Lotto–Soudal	+ 13"
5	Dylan Teuns (BEL)	BMC Racing Team	+ 27"
6	Marc Soler (ESP)	Movistar Team	+ 37"
7	Patrick Konrad (AUT)	Bora–Hansgrohe	+ 39"
8	Sergio Henao (COL)	Team Sky	+ 57"
9	Julian Alaphilippe (FRA)	Quick-Step Floors	+ 1' 48"
10	Alexis Vuillermoz (FRA)	AG2R La Mondiale	+ 1' 49"

=== Stage 8 ===
11 March 2018 — Nice to Nice, 110 km (68 mi)

Result of Stage 8
Rank	Rider	Team	Time
1	David de la Cruz (ESP)	Team Sky	2h 53' 06"
2	Omar Fraile (ESP)	Astana	+ 0"
3	Marc Soler (ESP)	Movistar Team	+ 3"
4	Patrick Konrad (AUT)	Bora–Hansgrohe	+ 38"
5	Tim Wellens (BEL)	Lotto–Soudal	+ 38"
6	Simon Yates (GBR)	Mitchelton–Scott	+ 38"
7	Dylan Teuns (BEL)	BMC Racing Team	+ 38"
8	Richard Carapaz (ECU)	Movistar Team	+ 38"
9	Gorka Izagirre (ESP)	Bahrain–Merida	+ 38"
10	Ion Izagirre (ESP)	Bahrain–Merida	+ 38"

Final general classification
Rank	Rider	Team	Time
1	Marc Soler (ESP)	Movistar Team	30h 22' 41"
2	Simon Yates (GBR)	Mitchelton–Scott	+ 4"
3	Gorka Izagirre (ESP)	Bahrain–Merida	+ 14"
4	Ion Izagirre (ESP)	Bahrain–Merida	+ 16"
5	Tim Wellens (BEL)	Lotto–Soudal	+ 16"
6	Dylan Teuns (BEL)	BMC Racing Team	+ 32"
7	Patrick Konrad (AUT)	Bora–Hansgrohe	+ 44"
8	Alexis Vuillermoz (FRA)	AG2R La Mondiale	+ 1' 54"
9	David de la Cruz (ESP)	Team Sky	+ 2' 15"
10	Felix Großschartner (AUT)	Bora–Hansgrohe	+ 2' 35"

== Classification leadership table ==
In the 2018 Paris–Nice, four jerseys were awarded. The general classification was calculated by adding each cyclist's finishing times on each stage. Time bonuses were awarded to the first three finishers on all stages except for the individual time trial: the stage winner won a ten-second bonus, with six and four seconds for the second and third riders respectively. Bonus seconds were also awarded to the first three riders at intermediate sprints – three seconds for the winner of the sprint, two seconds for the rider in second and one second for the rider in third. The leader of the general classification received a yellow jersey. This classification was considered the most important of the 2018 Paris–Nice, and the winner of the classification was considered the winner of the race.

Points for stage victory
Position	1	2	3	4	5	6	7	8	9	10
Points awarded	15	12	9	7	6	5	4	3	2	1

The second classification was the points classification. Riders were awarded points for finishing in the top ten in a stage. Unlike in the points classification in the Tour de France, the winners of all stages were awarded the same number of points. Points were also won in intermediate sprints; three points for crossing the sprint line first, two points for second place, and one for third. The leader of the points classification was awarded a green jersey.

Points for the mountains classification
Position	1	2	3	4	5	6	7
Points for Category 1	10	8	6	4	3	2	1
Points for Category 2	7	5	3	2	1	0	
Points for Category 3	4	2	1	0			

There was also a mountains classification, for which points were awarded for reaching the top of a climb before other riders. Each climb was categorised as either first, second, or third-category, with more points available for the more difficult, higher-categorised climbs. For first-category climbs, the top seven riders earned points; on second-category climbs, five riders won points; on third-category climbs, only the top three riders earned points. The leadership of the mountains classification was marked by a white jersey with red polka-dots.

The fourth jersey represented the young rider classification, marked by a white jersey. Only riders born after 1 January 1993 were eligible; the young rider best placed in the general classification was the leader of the young rider classification. There was also a classification for teams, in which the times of the best three cyclists in a team on each stage were added together; the leading team at the end of the race was the team with the lowest cumulative time.

Stage	Winner	General classification	Points classification	Mountains classification	Young rider classification	Teams classification
1	Arnaud Démare	Arnaud Démare	Arnaud Démare	Pierre-Luc Périchon	Felix Großschartner	Bahrain–Merida
2	Dylan Groenewegen	Arnaud Démare	Arnaud Démare	Pierre-Luc Périchon	Marc Soler	Bahrain–Merida
3	Jonathan Hivert	Luis León Sánchez	Arnaud Démare	Pierre-Luc Périchon	Felix Großschartner	Bahrain–Merida
4	Wout Poels	Luis León Sánchez	Arnaud Démare	Pierre-Luc Périchon	Marc Soler	Team Sky
5	Jérôme Cousin	Luis León Sánchez	Arnaud Démare	Jérôme Cousin	Marc Soler	Team Sky
6	Rudy Molard ⋅	Luis León Sánchez	Arnaud Démare	Fabien Grellier	Marc Soler	Mitchelton–Scott
7	Simon Yates	Simon Yates	Tim Wellens	Thomas De Gendt	Marc Soler	Mitchelton–Scott
8	David de la Cruz	Marc Soler	Tim Wellens	Thomas De Gendt	Marc Soler	Bahrain–Merida
Final		Marc Soler	Tim Wellens	Thomas De Gendt	Marc Soler	Bahrain–Merida
