= Rémy Di Gregorio =

French road bicycle racer

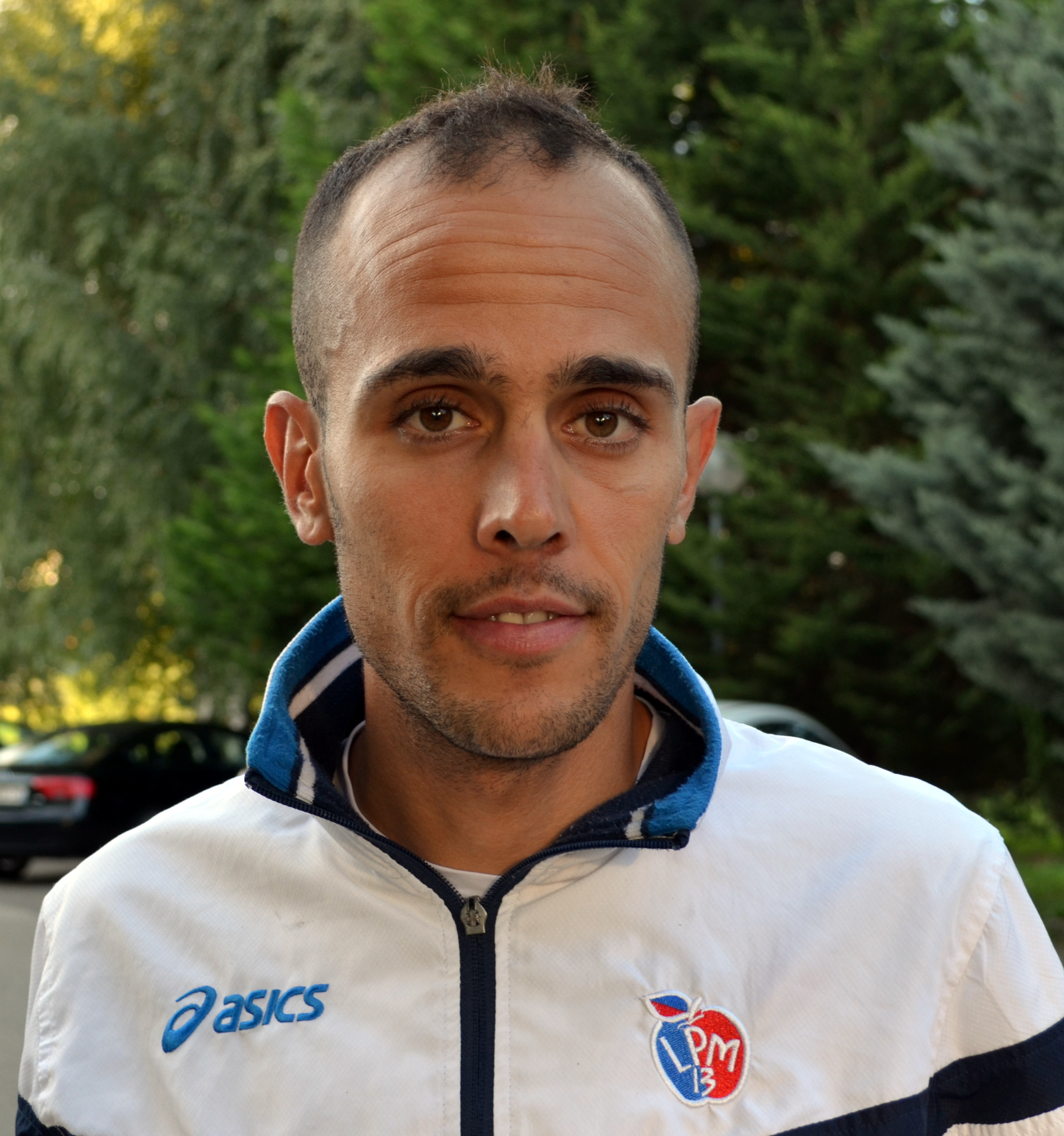
- Di Gregorio at the 2014 Tour de l'Ain

Personal information
- Full name: Rémy Di Gregorio
- Born: 31 July 1985 (age 41) Marseille, France
- Height: 1.80 m (5 ft 11 in)
- Weight: 67 kg (148 lb)

Cycling career
- Sport: Cycling
- Current team: Suspended
- Discipline: Road
- Role: Rider
- Rider type: Climber

Amateur teams
- 1999–2004: VC La Pomme
- 2013: Team Martigues

Professional teams
- 2005–2010: Française des Jeux
- 2011: Astana
- 2012: Cofidis
- 2014–2018: Team La Pomme Marseille 13

Rémy Di Gregorio (born 31 July 1985) is a French road bicycle racer, who is currently suspended from the sport following a positive in-competition doping test for darbepoetin alfa, a re-engineered form of erythropoietin (EPO). He has previously competed for Française des Jeux (2005–2010), Astana (2011), Cofidis (2012), and Delko–Marseille Provence KTM (2014–2018) in his professional career.

== Career ==
He rode his first Tour de France in 2007. He broke his elbow in a crash on the fourth stage. He finished the stage 7:58 behind the leader and left the race. He broke clear on the 10th stage of the 2008 Tour de France edition, on Bastille Day, and led until the final climb.

Di Gregorio returned to the professional peloton in 2014, with Team La Pomme Marseille 13.

== Doping ==
On 10 July 2012, the first rest day of the 2012 Tour de France, Remi di Gregorio was arrested by French police on suspicion of doping. In April 2013, it was revealed that Di Gregorio could resume his career, since the products found in his possession at the Tour turned out to be vitamins. Prosecutors said the case was not formally closed. Di Gregorio maintained he had never doped and successfully sued Cofidis for unfair dismissal.

In April 2018, news broke that Di Gregorio had failed an in-competition doping test for darbepoetin alfa, a re-engineered form of erythropoietin (EPO), during that year's Paris–Nice. He was suspended for 4 years, backdated from the adverse finding, following the confirmation that his B-sample also tested positive in May 2020.

== Major results ==
Di Gregorio at the 2006 Tour de Romandie

2003
1st Time trial, National Junior Road Championships
2004
3rd Overall Ronde de l'Isard
5th Paris–Mantes-en-Yvelines
2005
5th Overall Tour de l'Ain
2006
1st Stage 8 Tour de l'Avenir
2007
1st Mountains classification Critérium du Dauphiné Libéré
2008
10th Overall Tour Méditerranéen
Combativity award Stage 10 Tour de France
2009
5th Overall Route du Sud
6th Overall Tour de l'Ain
2010
5th Grand Prix d'Ouverture La Marseillaise
10th Overall Volta a Catalunya
2011
1st Stage 7 Paris–Nice
2012
3rd Overall Vuelta a Asturias

1st Stage 3

3rd Overall Vuelta a la Comunidad de Madrid
2013
1st Overall Tour of Bulgaria

1st Stage 2

2014
1st Overall Tour de Taiwan
2nd Boucles de l'Aulne
5th Overall Tour du Limousin
5th Classic Sud-Ardèche
5th Grand Prix de Plumelec-Morbihan
6th Overall Tour de l'Ain
9th Overall Tour Alsace

1st Mountains classification

9th Overall Tour d'Azerbaïdjan
9th Overall Tour du Gévaudan Languedoc-Roussillon
9th Tour du Jura
2016
1st Mountains classification Tour La Provence
1st Mountains classification Critérium International
2017
2nd Overall Tour of Almaty
2018
1st Mountains classification Étoile de Bessèges
1st Stage 2 Tour La Provence
6th Grand Prix d'Ouverture La Marseillaise
