= 2023 Tour de l'Ain =

2023 UCI Europe Tour
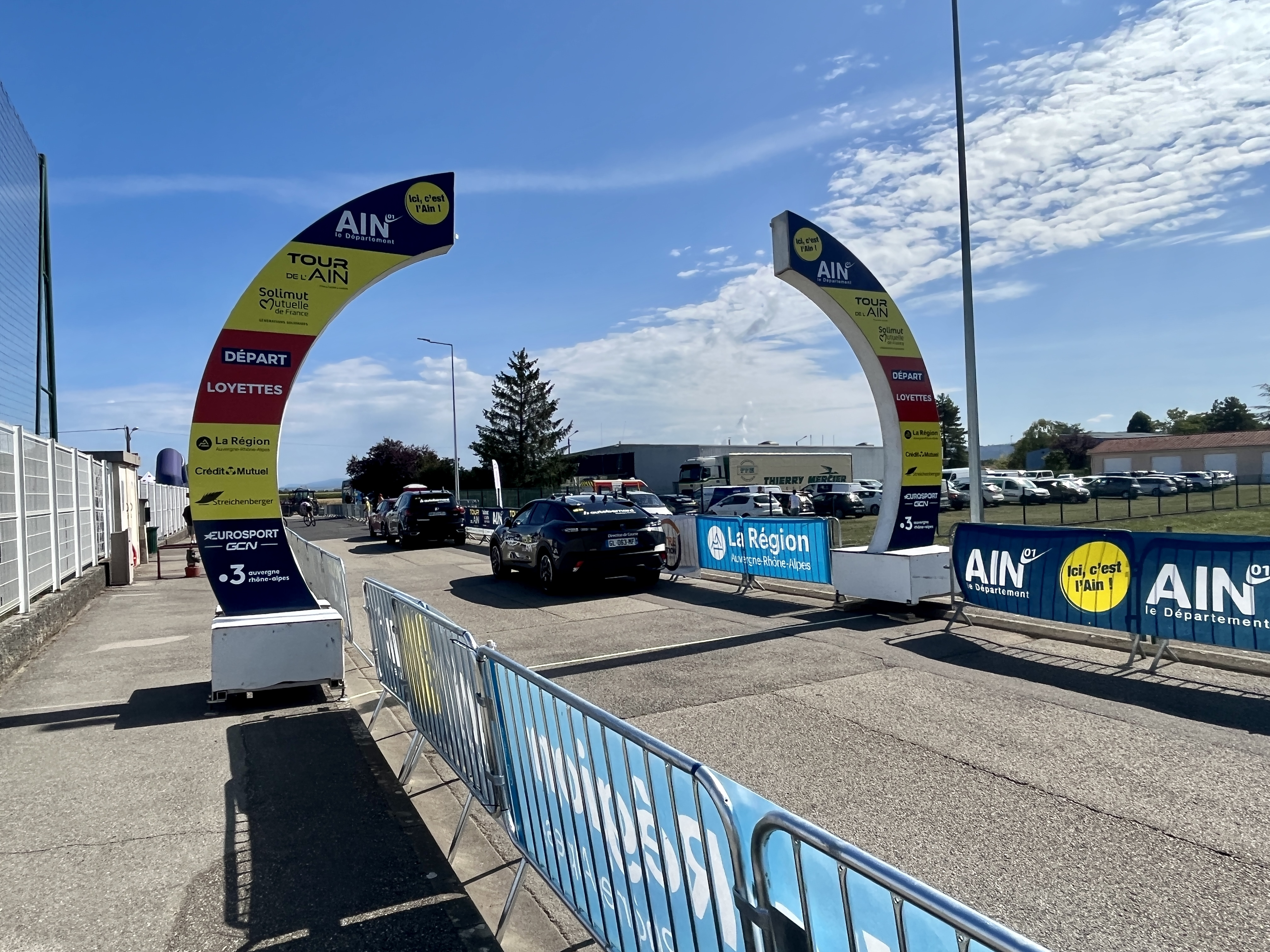
- The departure of stage 1 in Loyettes

Race details
- Dates: 31 July–2 August 2023
- Stages: 3
- Distance: 410.3 km (254.9 mi)
- Winning time: 9h 55' 50"

Results
Jersey awarded to the overall winner	Winner	Michael Storer (AUS)	(Groupama–FDJ)
	Second	Kenny Elissonde (FRA)	(Trek–Segafredo)
	Third	Nicolas Prodhomme (FRA)	(AG2R Citroën Team)
Jersey awarded to the points classification winner	Points	Michael Storer (AUS)	(Groupama–FDJ)
Jersey awarded to the mountains classification winner	Mountains	Lilian Calmejane (FRA)	(Intermarché–Circus–Wanty)
Jersey awarded to the young rider classification winner	Young rider	Joris Delbove (FRA)	(St. Michel–Mavic–Auber93)
Jersey awarded to the combativity classification winner	Combativity	Kenny Elissonde (FRA)	(Groupama–FDJ)
	Team	Groupama–FDJ	

The 2023 Tour de l'Ain was a men's road cycling stage race that took place between 31 July and 2 August 2023 in the French department of Ain. The race was rated as a category 2.1 event on the 2023 UCI Europe Tour calendar, and was the 35th edition of the Tour de l'Ain.

== Teams ==
Seven of the eighteen UCI WorldTeams, three UCI ProTeams, six UCI Continental teams, and one national team made up the seventeen teams that participated in the race.

UCI WorldTeams

- AG2R Citroën Team
- Arkéa–Samsic
- Cofidis
- EF Education–EasyPost
- Groupama–FDJ
- Intermarché–Circus–Wanty
- Trek–Segafredo

UCI ProTeams

- Q36.5 Pro Cycling Team
- Team TotalEnergies
- Tudor Pro Cycling Team

UCI Continental Teams

- St. Michel–Mavic–Auber93
- CIC U Nantes Atlantique
- Leopard TOGT Pro Cycling
- Nice Métropole Côte d'Azur
- St. Michel–Mavic–Auber93
- Van Rysel–Roubaix–Lille Métropole

National Teams

- Germany U–23

== Route ==
Stage characteristics and winners
Stage	Date	Course	Distance	Type	Stage winner
1	31 July	Loyettes to La Plaine Tonique	154.5 km (96.0 mi)	Flat stage	Jake Stewart (GBR)
2	1 August	Saint-Vulbas to Lagnieu	123.3 km (76.6 mi)	Medium mountain stage	Jefferson Alexander Cepeda (ECU)
3	2 August	Oyonnax to Lélex Monts-Jura	131.5 km (81.7 mi)	Medium mountain stage	Michael Storer (AUS)
Total			410.3 km (254.9 mi)		

== Stages ==
=== Stage 1 ===
31 July 2023 – Loyettes to La Plaine Tonique, 154 km (96 mi)

Stage 1 Result (1–10)
Rank	Rider	Team	Time
1	Jake Stewart (GBR)	Groupama–FDJ	3h 32' 15"
2	Emmanuel Morin (FRA)	CIC U Nantes Atlantique	+ 0"
3	Nacer Bouhanni (FRA)	Arkéa–Samsic	+ 0"
4	Tom Devriendt (BEL)	Q36.5 Pro Cycling Team	+ 0"
5	Jason Tesson (FRA)	Team TotalEnergies	+ 0"
6	Arne Marit (BEL)	Intermarché–Circus–Wanty	+ 0"
7	Tobias Müller (GER)	Rad-Net Oßwald	+ 0"
8	Emīls Liepiņš (LAT)	Trek–Segafredo	+ 0"
9	Romain Cardis (FRA)	St. Michel–Mavic–Auber93	+ 0"
10	Henri Uhlig (GER)	Alpecin–Deceuninck Development Team	+ 0"

General classification after Stage 1 (1–10)
Rank	Rider	Team	Time
1	Jake Stewart (GBR)	Groupama–FDJ	3h 32' 5"
2	Emmanuel Morin (FRA)	CIC U Nantes Atlantique	+ 4"
3	Nacer Bouhanni (FRA)	Arkéa–Samsic	+ 6"
4	Tom Devriendt (BEL)	Q36.5 Pro Cycling Team	+ 10"
5	Jason Tesson (FRA)	Team TotalEnergies	+ 10"
6	Arne Marit (BEL)	Intermarché–Circus–Wanty	+ 10"
7	Tobias Müller (GER)	Rad-Net Oßwald	+ 10"
8	Emīls Liepiņš (LAT)	Trek–Segafredo	+ 10"
9	Romain Cardis (FRA)	St. Michel–Mavic–Auber93	+ 10"
10	Henri Uhlig (GER)	Alpecin–Deceuninck Development Team	+ 10"

=== Stage 2 ===
1 August 2023 – Saint-Vulbas to Lagnieu, 124 km (77 mi)

Stage 2 Result (1–10)
Rank	Rider	Team	Time
1	Jefferson Alexander Cepeda (COL)	EF Education–EasyPost	2h 58' 11"
2	Michael Storer (AUS)	Groupama–FDJ	+ 0"
3	Kenny Elissonde (FRA)	Trek–Segafredo	+ 14"
4	Julien Bernard (FRA)	Trek–Segafredo	+ 37"
5	Rudy Molard (FRA)	Groupama–FDJ	+ 37"
6	Nicolas Prodhomme (FRA)	AG2R Citroën Team	+ 37"
7	Élie Gesbert (FRA)	Arkéa–Samsic	+ 37"
8	Jordan Jegat (FRA)	CIC U Nantes Atlantique	+ 37"
9	Merhawi Kudus (ERI)	EF Education–EasyPost	+ 37"
10	Sébastien Reichenbach (SUI)	Tudor Pro Cycling Team	+ 37"

General classification after Stage 2 (1–10)
Rank	Rider	Team	Time
1	Jefferson Alexander Cepeda (COL)	EF Education–EasyPost	6h 30' 16"
2	Michael Storer (AUS)	Groupama–FDJ	+ 4"
3	Hugh Carthy (GBR)	EF Education–EasyPost	+ 10"
4	Kenny Elissonde (FRA)	Trek–Segafredo	+ 20"
5	Rudy Molard (FRA)	Groupama–FDJ	+ 47"
6	Merhawi Kudus (ERI)	EF Education–EasyPost	+ 47"
7	Nicolas Prodhomme (FRA)	AG2R Citroën Team	+ 47"
8	Damien Howson (AUS)	Q36.5 Pro Cycling Team	+ 47"
9	Sébastien Reichenbach (SUI)	Tudor Pro Cycling Team	+ 47"
10	Jordan Jegat (FRA)	CIC U Nantes Atlantique	+ 47"

=== Stage 3 ===
2 August 2023 – Oyonnax to Lélex Monts-Jura, 137 km (85 mi)

Stage 3 Result (1–10)
Rank	Rider	Team	Time
1	Michael Storer (AUS)	Groupama–FDJ	3h 25' 40"
2	Kenny Elissonde (FRA)	Trek–Segafredo	+ 2' 02"
3	Lilian Calmejane (FRA)	Intermarché–Circus–Wanty	+ 2' 30"
4	Simon Pellaud (SUI)	Tudor Pro Cycling Team	+ 2' 32"
5	Nicolas Prodhomme (FRA)	AG2R Citroën Team	+ 2' 35"
6	Élie Gesbert (FRA)	Arkéa–Samsic	+ 2' 37"
7	Jesús Herrada (ESP)	Cofidis	+ 2' 37"
8	Rudy Molard (FRA)	Groupama–FDJ	+ 2' 37"
9	Julien Bernard (FRA)	Trek–Segafredo	+ 2' 37"
10	Merhawi Kudus (ERI)	EF Education–EasyPost	+ 2' 37"

General classification after Stage 3 (1–10)
Rank	Rider	Team	Time
1	Michael Storer (AUS)	Groupama–FDJ	9h 55' 50"
2	Kenny Elissonde (FRA)	Trek–Segafredo	+ 2' 22"
3	Nicolas Prodhomme (FRA)	AG2R Citroën Team	+ 3' 28"
4	Rudy Molard (FRA)	Groupama–FDJ	+ 3' 30"
5	Merhawi Kudus (ERI)	EF Education–EasyPost	+ 3' 30"
6	Sébastien Reichenbach (SUI)	Tudor Pro Cycling Team	+ 3' 30"
7	Élie Gesbert (FRA)	Arkéa–Samsic	+ 3' 30"
8	Jordan Jegat (FRA)	CIC U Nantes Atlantique	+ 3' 30"
9	Jesús Herrada (ESP)	Cofidis	+ 3' 30"
10	Julien Bernard (FRA)	Trek–Segafredo	+ 3' 30"

== Classification leadership ==
Classification leadership by stage
Stage	Winner	General classification	Points classification	Mountains classification	Young rider classification	Team classification	Combativity award
1	Jake Stewart	Jake Stewart	Jake Stewart	Mads Østergaard Kristensen	Tobias Müller	CIC U Nantes Atlantique	Mads Østergaard Kristensen
2	Jefferson Alexander Cepeda	Jefferson Alexander Cepeda	Jefferson Alexander Cepeda	Mads Østergaard Kristensen	Reuben Thompson	EF Education–EasyPost	Thomas Devaux
3	Michael Storer	Michael Storer	Michael Storer	Lilian Calmejane	Joris Delbove	Groupama–FDJ	Lilian Calmejane
Final		Michael Storer	Michael Storer	Lilian Calmejane	Joris Delbove	Groupama–FDJ	Kenny Elissonde

== Final classification standings ==
Legend
Denotes the winner of the general classification	Denotes the winner of the young rider classification
Denotes the winner of the points classification	Denotes the winner of the combativity award
Denotes the winner of the mountains classification	

=== General classification ===
Final general classification (1–10)
Rank	Rider	Team	Time
1	Michael Storer (AUS)	Groupama–FDJ	9h 55' 50"
2	Kenny Elissonde (FRA)	Trek–Segafredo	+ 2' 22"
3	Nicolas Prodhomme (FRA)	AG2R Citroën Team	+ 3' 28"
4	Rudy Molard (FRA)	Groupama–FDJ	+ 3' 30"
5	Merhawi Kudus (ERI)	EF Education–EasyPost	+ 3' 30"
6	Sébastien Reichenbach (SUI)	Tudor Pro Cycling Team	+ 3' 30"
7	Élie Gesbert (FRA)	Arkéa–Samsic	+ 3' 30"
8	Jordan Jegat (FRA)	CIC U Nantes Atlantique	+ 3' 30"
9	Jesús Herrada (ESP)	Cofidis	+ 3' 30"
10	Julien Bernard (FRA)	Trek–Segafredo	+ 3' 30"

=== Points classification ===
Final points classification (1–10)
Rank	Rider	Team	Points
1	Michael Storer (AUS)	Groupama–FDJ	45
2	Kenny Elissonde (FRA)	Trek–Segafredo	36
3	Jefferson Alexander Cepeda (COL)	EF Education–EasyPost	25
4	Jake Stewart (GBR)	Groupama–FDJ	25
5	Nicolas Prodhomme (FRA)	AG2R Citroën Team	22
6	Julien Bernard (FRA)	Trek–Segafredo	21
7	Rudy Molard (FRA)	Groupama–FDJ	20
8	Emmanuel Morin (FRA)	CIC U Nantes Atlantique	20
9	Élie Gesbert (FRA)	Arkéa–Samsic	19
10	Lilian Calmejane (FRA)	Intermarché–Circus–Wanty	17

=== Mountains classification ===
Final mountains classification (1–10)
Rank	Rider	Team	Points
1	Lilian Calmejane (FRA)	Intermarché–Circus–Wanty	41
2	Michael Storer (AUS)	Groupama–FDJ	31
3	Mads Østergaard (DEN)	Leopard TOGT Pro Cycling	25
4	Kenny Elissonde (FRA)	Trek–Segafredo	15
5	Clément Venturini (FRA)	AG2R Citroën Team	14
6	Maxime Jarnet (FRA)	Van Rysel–Roubaix–Lille Métropole	12
7	Simon Pellaud (SUI)	Tudor Pro Cycling Team	10
8	Jefferson Alexander Cepeda (COL)	EF Education–EasyPost	10
9	Théo Delacroix (FRA)	St. Michel–Mavic–Auber93	9
10	Jesus Herrada (ESP)	Cofidis	8

=== Young rider classification ===
Final young rider classification (1–10)
Rank	Rider	Team	Time
1	Joris Delbove (FRA)	St. Michel–Mavic–Auber93	10h 0' 14"
2	Reuben Thompson (AUS)	Groupama–FDJ	+ 45"
3	Alexy Faure-Prost (FRA)	Intermarché–Circus–Wanty	+ 1' 37"
4	Baptiste Huyet (FRA)	Van Rysel–Roubaix–Lille Métropole	+ 2' 27"
5	Andrea Piccolo (ITA)	EF Education–EasyPost	+ 6' 40"
6	Thomas Gachignard (FRA)	St. Michel–Mavic–Auber93	+ 7' 09"
7	Maximilien Juillard (FRA)	Van Rysel–Roubaix–Lille Métropole	+ 7' 37"
8	Harold Martín López (ECU)	Astana Qazaqstan Team	+ 7' 43"
9	Hugo Toumire (FRA)	Cofidis	+ 10' 14"
10	Mats Wenzel (LUX)	Leopard TOGT Pro Cycling	+ 10' 27"

=== Team classification ===
Final team classification (1–10)
Rank	Team	Time
1	Groupama–FDJ	29h 56' 25"
2	Trek–Segafredo	+ 1' 40"
3	EF Education–EasyPost	+ 5' 27"
4	Tudor Pro Cycling Team	+ 6' 34"
5	AG2R Citroën Team	+ 17' 29"
6	Intermarché–Circus–Wanty	+ 17' 33"
7	Cofidis	+ 18' 10"
8	Van Rysel–Roubaix–Lille Métropole	+ 21' 08"
9	St. Michel–Mavic–Auber93	+ 23' 13"
10	Q36.5 Pro Cycling Team	+ 26' 59"
