= Rudy Molard =

French road bicycle racer

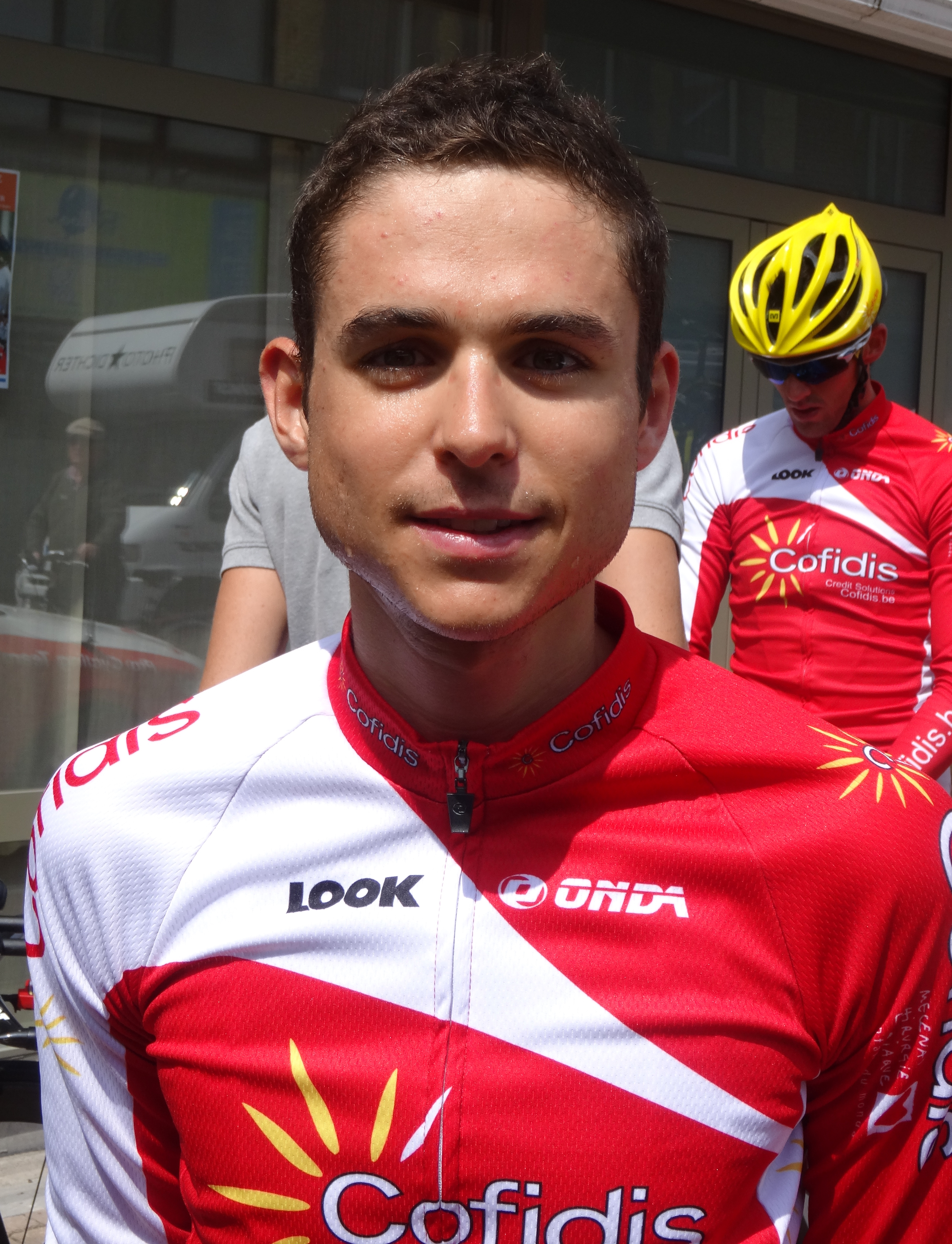
- Molard at the 2014 Tour of Belgium.

Personal information
- Full name: Rudy Molard
- Born: 17 September 1989 (age 37) Gleizé, France
- Height: 1.78 m (5 ft 10 in)
- Weight: 62 kg (137 lb; 9 st 11 lb)

Cycling career
- Sport: Cycling
- Current team: Groupama–FDJ United
- Discipline: Road
- Role: Rider
- Rider type: Climber

Amateur teams
- 2008–2010: CR4C Roanne
- 2011: CC Étupes

Professional teams
- 2011: Cofidis (stagiaire)
- 2012–2016: Cofidis
- 2017–: FDJ

Rudy Molard (born 17 September 1989) is a French road bicycle racer, who currently rides for UCI WorldTeam Groupama–FDJ United.

== Career ==
Molard spent 5 years with Cofidis before moving to FDJ in 2017. During his five year stint with Cofidis, Molard won a Stage at the 2015 Tour du Limousin. He also rode the Tour de France twice, finishing 73rd in 2013. and 51st in 2014.

=== FDJ (2017–present) ===
==== 2017 ====
Molard finished 16th overall at Paris–Nice, and 24th at Tour of the Basque Country in his first season with FDJ. He had a great form during the spring classics, finishing 8th at La Flèche Wallonne, and 17th at Liège–Bastogne–Liège. He was included in the FDJ team at the 100th Giro d'Italia, and the Tour de France.

==== 2018 ====
Molard opened his 2018 season off by finishing 3rd overall at both the Tour La Provence, and the Tour du Haut Var. His next race was Paris–Nice, in which he managed to win Stage 6 from Sisteron to Vence. He attacked inside the final kilometer, and managed to get away from the front group. Molard went on to finish 15th overall. He rode the spring classics, and continued his form; he finished 15th at the Amstel Gold Race, 13th at La Flèche Wallonne and 26th at Liège–Bastogne–Liège.

As a preparation for the Tour de France, he rode the Critérium du Dauphiné, and then the French National Road Race Championships, where he finished 6th. His best result during the Tour de France, was 14th on Stage 16. A week after the Tour de France, he finished 11th at Clásica de San Sebastián. At the end of August, he started the Vuelta a España, and managed to get the Leaders Jersey on Stage 5, after being in the breakaway all day. He had the leaders jersey in 4 days before losing it on stage 9.

== Major results ==
2011
3rd Time trial, National Under-23 Road Championships
UEC European Under-23 Road Championships

6th Road race
9th Time trial

10th Time trial, UCI Under-23 Road World Championships
2012
1st Mountains classification, Tour de l'Ain
3rd Overall Tour du Gévaudan Languedoc-Roussillon
2013
9th Grand Prix de la Ville de Lillers
10th Overall Tour du Gévaudan Languedoc-Roussillon
2014
4th Overall Tour de Luxembourg

1st Young rider classification

9th Paris–Troyes
2015
3rd Overall Tour du Limousin

1st Stage 3

3rd Tour du Doubs
5th Overall Tour de Luxembourg
6th La Drôme Classic
9th Grand Prix de la Somme
9th Grand Prix de Wallonie
2017
8th La Flèche Wallonne
2018
1st Stage 6 Paris–Nice
3rd Overall Tour La Provence
3rd Overall Tour du Haut Var
Vuelta a España

Held after Stages 5–8

2019
5th Overall Tour de la Provence
7th Overall Paris–Nice
9th Overall Tour du Haut Var
10th Giro di Lombardia
2020
7th Overall Paris–Nice
10th Paris–Tours
2021
2nd Road race, National Road Championships
4th Overall Tour des Alpes-Maritimes et du Var
2022
3rd Overall Tour de l'Ain
8th Giro di Lombardia
8th Giro dell'Emilia
8th La Flèche Wallonne
9th Tour du Jura
9th Classic Grand Besançon Doubs
Vuelta a España

Held after Stage 5

2023
2nd Road race, National Road Championships
4th Overall Tour de l'Ain
Combativity award Stage 1 Giro d'Italia
2024
3rd Grand Prix Cycliste de Québec
3rd Tour du Finistère
5th Overall Tour de l'Ain
9th Overall Tour de Wallonie

=== Grand Tour general classification results timeline ===
Grand Tour	2012	2013	2014	2015	2016	2017	2018	2019	2020	2021	2022	2023	2024
Giro d'Italia	—	—	—	—	—	44	—	—	—	37	—	69	—
Tour de France	—	73	51	—	—	36	38	33	39	—	—	—	
Vuelta a España	113	—	—	—	30	—	14	—	—	DNF	30	29	
Major stage race general classification results
Race	2012	2013	2014	2015	2016	2017	2018	2019	2020	2021	2022	2023	2024
Paris–Nice	—	—	—	—	—	16	15	7	7	—	—	17	—
Tirreno–Adriatico	—	—	—	—	—	—	—	—	—	16	—	—	—
Volta a Catalunya	—	64	52	44	41	—	—	—	NH	—	DNF	—	—
Tour of the Basque Country	—	—	—	26	44	24	DNF	30	NH	—	32	—	—
Tour de Romandie	—	—	—	—	—	—	29	—	NH	—	25	—	36
Critérium du Dauphiné	—	64	—	—	83	—	29	21	—	—	37	—	—
Tour de Suisse	—	—	—	—	—	—	—	—	NH	—	—	—	—

Legend
—	Did not compete
DNF	Did not finish
