= Tony Gallopin =

French road bicycle racer

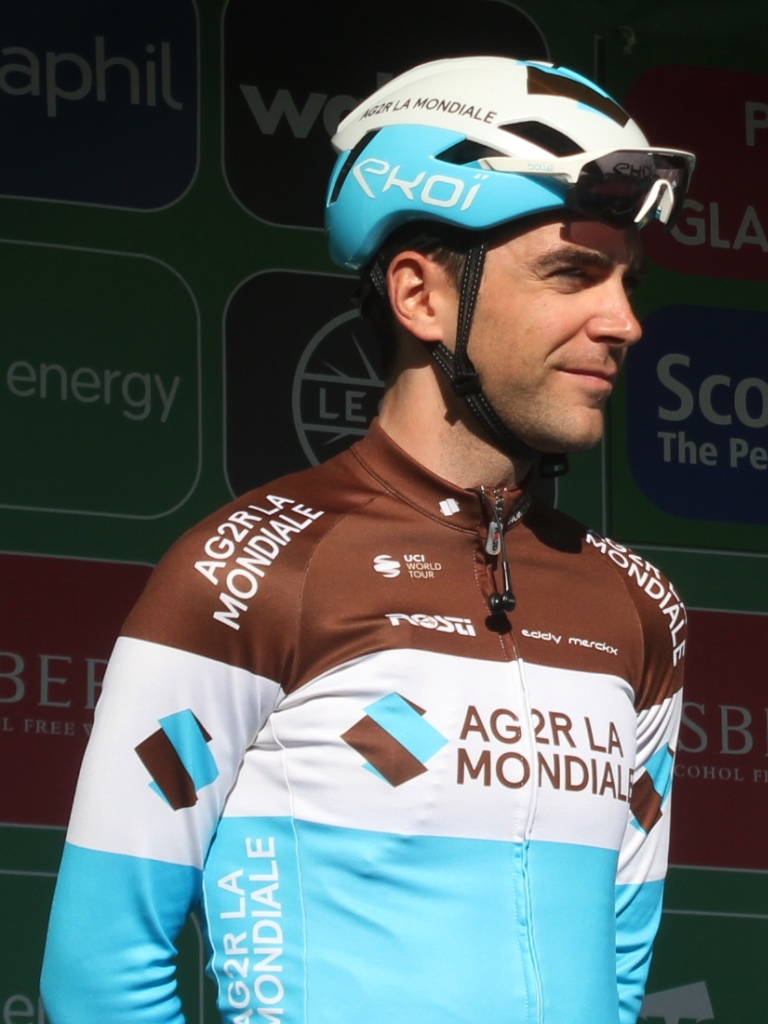
- Gallopin at the 2019 Tour of Britain

Personal information
- Full name: Tony Gallopin
- Nickname: Gallo
- Born: 24 May 1988 (age 38) Dourdan, Île-de-France, France
- Height: 1.80 m (5 ft 11 in)
- Weight: 69 kg (152 lb; 10 st 12 lb)

Cycling career
- Sport: Cycling
- Discipline: Road
- Role: Rider
- Rider type: Puncheur

Amateur teams
- 1997–2001: CC Angerville
- 2002–2006: VC Étampes
- 2007: SCO Dijon Lapierre

Professional teams
- 2008–2009: Auber 93
- 2010–2011: Cofidis
- 2012–2013: RadioShack–Nissan
- 2014–2017: Lotto–Belisol
- 2018–2021: AG2R La Mondiale
- 2022–2023: Trek–Segafredo

Major wins
- Grand Tours Tour de France 1 individual stage (2014) Vuelta a España 1 individual stage (2018) Single-day races and Classics Clásica de San Sebastián (2013) Grand Prix de Wallonie (2016)

Tony Gallopin (born 24 May 1988) is a French former professional road racing cyclist, who competed as a professional from 2008 to 2023. During his career, he won a stage at the 2014 Tour de France and the 2018 Vuelta a España, and also won the 2013 Clásica de San Sebastián.

== Career ==
Born in Dourdan, Île-de-France, Gallopin previously resided in Angerville.

After two seasons with the RadioShack–Leopard squad, Gallopin joined the Lotto–Belisol team for the 2014 season.

On 13 July 2014 Gallopin escaped in a breakaway on Stage 9 of the Tour de France, gaining almost 8 minutes on the leader Vincenzo Nibali to take the yellow jersey. Three days later, on Stage 11, Gallopin escaped from the main peloton on the final descent into Oyonnax to win the stage, just in front of the chasing pack.

He won stage 7 of the 2018 Vuelta a España after attacking inside the last 3 kilometers. In May 2019, he was named in the startlist for the Giro d'Italia.

Gallopin announced that he would retire from cycling at the end of the 2023 season following a 16-year professional career.

== Personal life ==
Gallopin married fellow racing cyclist and former French national road racing champion Marion Rousse on 18 October 2014. In February 2020, Rousse announced via an Instagram post that the couple had separated.

His father Joël Gallopin and his uncle Guy Gallopin also competed professionally as cyclists.

== Major results ==
2005
2nd Chrono des Nations Juniors
2006
1st Chrono des Nations Juniors
2nd Time trial, National Junior Road Championships
UCI Junior World Championships

3rd Road race
3rd Time trial

7th Road race, UEC European Junior Road Championships
2007
2nd Time trial, National Under-23 Road Championships
4th Chrono Champenois
9th Overall Tour du Haut-Anjou
2008
1st Paris–Tours Espoirs
3rd Overall Thüringen Rundfahrt der U23
7th Time trial, UEC European Under-23 Road Championships
2009
4th Paris–Mantes-en-Yvelines
7th Overall Tour du Poitou-Charentes
8th Grand Prix Cristal Energie
2010 (1 pro win)
1st Stage 3 Tour de Luxembourg
6th Overall Boucles de la Mayenne
10th Overall Tour de l'Ain
2011 (2)
1st Overall French Road Cycling Cup
1st Flèche d'Emeraude
2nd Cholet-Pays de Loire
3rd Overall Tour de Luxembourg
4th Overall Tour du Limousin

1st Stage 2

6th Polynormande
6th Grand Prix de Plumelec-Morbihan
6th Trofeo Magaluf-Palmanova
8th Châteauroux Classic
9th Tour du Doubs
9th Trofeo Palma de Mallorca
10th Route Adélie
10th Trofeo Inca
2012
3rd Overall Tour of Oman

1st Young rider classification

6th Overall Bayern Rundfahrt

1st Young rider classification

10th Grand Prix Cycliste de Montréal
2013 (1)
1st Clásica de San Sebastián
3rd Road race, National Road Championships
4th Overall Circuit de la Sarthe
2014 (1)
Tour de France

1st Stage 11
Held after Stage 9

2nd Grand Prix de Wallonie
3rd Brabantse Pijl
3rd Grand Prix Cycliste de Montréal
5th Clásica de San Sebastián
6th Road race, UCI Road World Championships
6th E3 Harelbeke
7th Overall Étoile de Bessèges
9th Grand Prix Cycliste de Québec
10th Overall Paris–Nice
2015 (2)
2nd Road race, National Road Championships
2nd Overall Étoile de Bessèges

1st Stage 4

4th International Road Cycling Challenge
4th Brabantse Pijl
6th Overall Paris–Nice

1st Stage 6

6th Amstel Gold Race
7th Road race, UCI Road World Championships
7th Giro di Lombardia
8th Grand Prix Cycliste de Québec
9th Milan–San Remo
2016 (1)
1st Grand Prix de Wallonie
National Road Championships

2nd Road race
3rd Time trial

2nd Overall Étoile de Bessèges
2nd Clásica de San Sebastián
3rd Brabantse Pijl
4th Overall Tour of Britain
6th Overall Volta ao Algarve
7th Road race, UEC European Road Championships
8th Overall Paris–Nice
8th Grand Prix d'Ouverture La Marseillaise
2017 (1)
2nd Overall Étoile de Bessèges

1st Stage 5 (ITT)

2nd Clásica de San Sebastián
2nd Grand Prix de Wallonie
3rd Overall Volta ao Algarve
5th Grand Prix d'Ouverture La Marseillaise
6th Grand Prix Cycliste de Montréal
9th Grand Prix Cycliste de Québec
10th Overall Paris–Nice
10th Overall Tour of Norway
2018 (3)
1st Overall Étoile de Bessèges

1st Stage 5 (ITT)

1st Stage 7 Vuelta a España
2nd Time trial, National Road Championships
2nd Overall Tour La Provence
9th Grand Prix d'Ouverture La Marseillaise
2019
2nd Overall Tour Poitou-Charentes en Nouvelle-Aquitaine
3rd Overall Tour de la Provence
4th Overall Route d'Occitanie
9th Grand Prix de Wallonie
9th Mont Ventoux Dénivelé Challenge
2021
1st Sprints classification, UAE Tour
2022
7th GP Industria & Artigianato di Larciano
10th Binche–Chimay–Binche
2023
2nd Circuito de Getxo
4th Road race, National Road Championships
8th GP Industria & Artigianato di Larciano

=== General classification results timeline ===
Grand Tour general classification results
Grand Tour	2010	2011	2012	2013	2014	2015	2016	2017	2018	2019	2020	2021	2022	2023
Giro d'Italia	—	—	—	—	—	—	—	—	—	DNF	DNF	60	—	—
Tour de France	—	78	DNF	58	29	31	71	21	DNF	56	—	—	37	86
Vuelta a España	89	—	—	—	—	—	—	—	11	—	—	—	—	
Major stage race general classification results
Race	2010	2011	2012	2013	2014	2015	2016	2017	2018	2019	2020	2021	2022	2023
Paris–Nice	—	DNF	—	41	10	6	8	10	28	DNF	—	—	—	—
Tirreno–Adriatico	—	—	DNF	—	—	—	—	—	—	—	—	—	—	—
Volta a Catalunya	—	—	—	—	—	—	—	—	—	DNF	NH	DNF	—	—
Tour of the Basque Country	—	—	—	—	—	DNF	DNF	—	—	—	NH	—	48	40
Tour de Romandie	—	—	—	—	—	—	—	—	—	—	NH	—	—	44
Critérium du Dauphiné	—	—	32	33	27	30	44	38	31	—	85	—	62	—
Tour de Suisse	—	—	—	—	—	—	—	—	—	—	NH	—	—	36

Legend
—	Did not compete
DNF	Did not finish
DSQ	Disqualified
NH	Not held
