= 2018 Tour La Provence =

UCI Europe Tour

Race details
- Dates: 8–11 February 2017
- Stages: 4
- Distance: 482.9 km (300.1 mi)
- Winning time: 12h 13' 05"

Results
Jersey awarded to the overall winner	Winner	Alexandre Geniez (France)	(AG2R La Mondiale)
	Second	Tony Gallopin (France)	(AG2R La Mondiale)
	Third	Rudy Molard (France)	(FDJ)
Jersey awarded to the points classification winner	Points	Christophe Laporte (France)	(Cofidis)
Jersey awarded to the mountains classification winner	Mountains	Diego Pablo Sevilla (Spain)	(Polartec–Kometa)
Jersey awarded to the youth classification winner	Youth	Mathias Le Turnier (France)	(Cofidis)
	Team	AG2R La Mondiale	

The 2018 Tour La Provence was a road cycling stage race that took place between 8 and 11 February 2018. The race was rated as a 2.1 event as part of the 2018 UCI Europe Tour, and was the third edition of the Tour La Provence.

The race was won by French rider Alexandre Geniez, of the AG2R La Mondiale.

== Teams ==
Sixteen teams were invited to start the race. These included two UCI WorldTeams, eight UCI Professional Continental teams and six UCI Continental teams.

UCI WorldTeams

- AG2R La Mondiale
- Groupama–FDJ

UCI Professional Continental teams

- Cofidis
- Delko–Marseille Provence KTM
- Nippo–Vini Fantini–Europa Ovini
- Direct Énergie
- Fortuneo–Samsic
- Vital Concept
- WB Aqua Protect Veranclassic
- Euskadi–Murias

UCI Continental teams

- Amore & Vita–Prodir
- St. Michel–Auber93
- Team Lotto–Kern Haus
- Polartec–Kometa
- Roubaix–Lille Métropole
- Sovac–Natura4Ever

== Route ==
Stage schedule
Stage	Date	Route	Distance	Type	Winner
P	8 February	Castellet to Castellet	5.8 km (4 mi)	Individual time trial	Alexandre Geniez (FRA)
1	9 February	Aubagne to Istres	165.9 km (103 mi)	Hilly stage	Christophe Laporte (FRA)
2	10 February	La Ciotat to Gémenos - Col de l'Espigoulier	144.5 km (90 mi)	Medium-mountain stage	Rémy Di Gregorio (FRA)
3	11 February	Aix-en-Provence to Marseille	166.7 km (104 mi)	Hilly stage	Christophe Laporte (FRA)

== Stages ==
=== Prologue ===
8 February 2018 — Castellet to Castellet, 5.8 km (4 mi)

Result of Prologue & General classification after Prologue
Rank	Rider	Team	Time
1	Alexandre Geniez (FRA)	AG2R La Mondiale	6' 49"
2	Sylvain Chavanel (FRA)	Direct Énergie	+ 2"
3	Christophe Laporte (FRA)	Cofidis	+ 2"
4	Tony Gallopin (FRA)	AG2R La Mondiale	+ 5"
5	Rudy Molard (FRA)	Groupama–FDJ	+ 7"
6	Yoann Paillot (FRA)	St. Michel–Auber93	+ 7"
7	Jérémy Cabot (FRA)	Roubaix–Lille Métropole	+ 7"
8	Marc Sarreau (FRA)	Groupama–FDJ	+ 8"
9	Bruno Armirail (FRA)	Groupama–FDJ	+ 8"
10	Anthony Perez (FRA)	Cofidis	+ 10"

=== Stage 1 ===
9 February 2018 — Aubagne to Istres, 165.9 km (103 mi)

Result of Stage 1
Rank	Rider	Team	Time
1	Christophe Laporte (FRA)	Cofidis	4h 04' 44"
2	Eduard-Michael Grosu (ROM)	Nippo–Vini Fantini–Europa Ovini	+ 0"
3	Pierre Barbier (FRA)	Roubaix–Lille Métropole	+ 0"
4	Rudy Barbier (FRA)	AG2R La Mondiale	+ 0"
5	Lilian Calmejane (FRA)	Direct Énergie	+ 0"
6	Julen Irizar (ESP)	Euskadi–Murias	+ 0"
7	Dorian Godon (FRA)	Cofidis	+ 0"
8	Youcef Reguigui (ALG)	Sovac–Natura4Ever	+ 0"
9	Jonas Van Genechten (BEL)	Vital Concept	+ 0"
10	Justin Jules (FRA)	WB Aqua Protect Veranclassic	+ 0"

General classification after Stage 1
Rank	Rider	Team	Time
1	Alexandre Geniez (FRA)	AG2R La Mondiale	4h 11' 13"
2	Sylvain Chavanel (FRA)	Direct Énergie	+ 2"
3	Christophe Laporte (FRA)	Cofidis	+ 2"
4	Tony Gallopin (FRA)	AG2R La Mondiale	+ 5"
5	Rudy Molard (FRA)	Groupama–FDJ	+ 7"
6	Yoann Paillot (FRA)	St. Michel–Auber93	+ 7"
7	Jérémy Cabot (FRA)	Roubaix–Lille Métropole	+ 7"
8	Marc Sarreau (FRA)	Groupama–FDJ	+ 8"
9	Bruno Armirail (FRA)	Groupama–FDJ	+ 8"
10	Anthony Perez (FRA)	Cofidis	+ 10"

=== Stage 2 ===
10 February 2018 — La Ciotat to Gémenos - Col de l'Espigoulier, 144.5 km (90 mi)

Result of Stage 2
Rank	Rider	Team	Time
1	Rémy Di Gregorio (FRA)	Delko–Marseille Provence KTM	3h 46' 05"
2	Lilian Calmejane (FRA)	Direct Énergie	+ 0"
3	Tony Gallopin (FRA)	AG2R La Mondiale	+ 0"
4	Jonathan Hivert (FRA)	Direct Énergie	+ 0"
5	Mathias Le Turnier (FRA)	Cofidis	+ 0"
6	Rudy Molard (FRA)	Cofidis	+ 0"
7	Alexandre Geniez (FRA)	AG2R La Mondiale	+ 0"
8	David Gaudu (FRA)	Groupama–FDJ	+ 0"
9	Mathias Frank (SUI)	AG2R La Mondiale	+ 3"
10	Sylvain Chavanel (FRA)	Direct Énergie	+ 9"

General classification after Stage 2
Rank	Rider	Team	Time
1	Alexandre Geniez (FRA)	AG2R La Mondiale	7h 57' 38"
2	Tony Gallopin (FRA)	AG2R La Mondiale	+ 5"
3	Rudy Molard (FRA)	Groupama–FDJ	+ 7"
4	Sylvain Chavanel (FRA)	Direct Énergie	+ 11"
5	Lilian Calmejane (FRA)	Direct Énergie	+ 13"
6	Mathias Le Turnier (FRA)	Cofidis	+ 14"
7	Mathias Frank (SUI)	AG2R La Mondiale	+ 16"
8	Jonathan Hivert (FRA)	Direct Énergie	+ 19"
9	David Gaudu (FRA)	Groupama–FDJ	+ 24"
10	Quentin Pacher (FRA)	Vital Concept	+ 41"

=== Stage 3 ===
11 February 2018 — Aix-en-Provence to Marseille, 166.7 km (104 mi)

Result of Stage 3
Rank	Rider	Team	Time
1	Christophe Laporte (FRA)	Cofidis	4h 15' 27"
2	Pierre Barbier (FRA)	Roubaix–Lille Métropole	+ 0"
3	Jonas Van Genechten (BEL)	Vital Concept	+ 0"
4	Samuel Dumoulin (FRA)	AG2R La Mondiale	+ 0"
5	Romain Feillu (FRA)	St. Michel–Auber93	+ 0"
6	Jérémy Leveau (FRA)	Delko–Marseille Provence KTM	+ 0"
7	Damiano Cima (ITA)	Nippo–Vini Fantini–Europa Ovini	+ 0"
8	Marc Sarreau (FRA)	Groupama–FDJ	+ 0"
9	Romain Hardy (FRA)	Fortuneo–Samsic	+ 0"
10	Cyril Barthe (FRA)	Euskadi–Murias	+ 0"

Final general classification
Rank	Rider	Team	Time
1	Alexandre Geniez (FRA)	AG2R La Mondiale	12h 13' 05"
2	Tony Gallopin (FRA)	AG2R La Mondiale	+ 5"
3	Rudy Molard (FRA)	Groupama–FDJ	+ 7"
4	Sylvain Chavanel (FRA)	Direct Énergie	+ 11"
5	Lilian Calmejane (FRA)	Direct Énergie	+ 13"
6	Mathias Le Turnier (FRA)	Cofidis	+ 14"
7	Mathias Frank (SUI)	AG2R La Mondiale	+ 16"
8	Jonathan Hivert (FRA)	Direct Énergie	+ 19"
9	David Gaudu (FRA)	Groupama–FDJ	+ 24"
10	Quentin Pacher (FRA)	Vital Concept	+ 41"

== Classification leadership table ==
In the 2018 Tour La Provence, four different jerseys were awarded for the main classifications. For the general classification, calculated by adding each cyclist's finishing times on each stage, the leader received a blue jersey. This classification was considered the most important of the 2018 Tour La Provence, and the winner of the classification was considered the winner of the race.

Additionally, there was a points classification, which awarded a green jersey. In the points classification, cyclists received points for finishing in the top 15 in a mass-start stage. For winning a stage, a rider earned 25 points, with 20 for second, 16 for third, 13 for fourth, 11 for fifth with a point fewer per place down to a single point for 15th place. Points towards the classification could also be accrued at intermediate sprint points during each stage. There was also a mountains classification, the leadership of which was marked by a red jersey. In the mountains classification, points were won by reaching the top of a climb before other cyclists, with more points available for the higher-categorised climbs. The fourth jersey represented the young rider classification, marked by a white jersey. This was decided in the same way as the general classification, but only riders born after 1 January 1995 were eligible to be ranked in the classification.

Additional jerseys were also awarded for the best rider in the overall classification from the Provence region (grey jersey), the most combative rider (black jersey) and the rider placed highest cumulatively across the general, points and mountains classification (multi-coloured jersey).

Stage	Winner	General classification	Points classification	Mountains classification	Young rider classification	Regional rider classification	Combination classification	Combativity classification	Teams classification
P	Alexandre Geniez	Alexandre Geniez	Alexandre Geniez	none	Bruno Armirail	Christophe Laporte	Alexandre Geniez	Tony Gallopin	AG2R La Mondiale
1	Christophe Laporte	Alexandre Geniez	Christophe Laporte	Marco Bernardinetti	Bruno Armirail	Christophe Laporte	Diego Pablo Sevilla	Jerome Mainard	AG2R La Mondiale
2	Rémy Di Gregorio	Alexandre Geniez	Lilian Calmejane	Ángel Madrazo	Mathias Le Turnier	Maxime Bouet	Lilian Calmejane	Ludovic Robeet	AG2R La Mondiale
3	Christophe Laporte	Alexandre Geniez	Christophe Laporte	Diego Pablo Sevilla	Mathias Le Turnier	Maxime Bouet	Lilian Calmejane	Kevin Ledanois	AG2R La Mondiale
Final		Alexandre Geniez	Christophe Laporte	Diego Pablo Sevilla	Mathias Le Turnier	Maxime Bouet	Lilian Calmejane	-	AG2R La Mondiale
