= Mathias Le Turnier =

French road cyclist (born 1995)

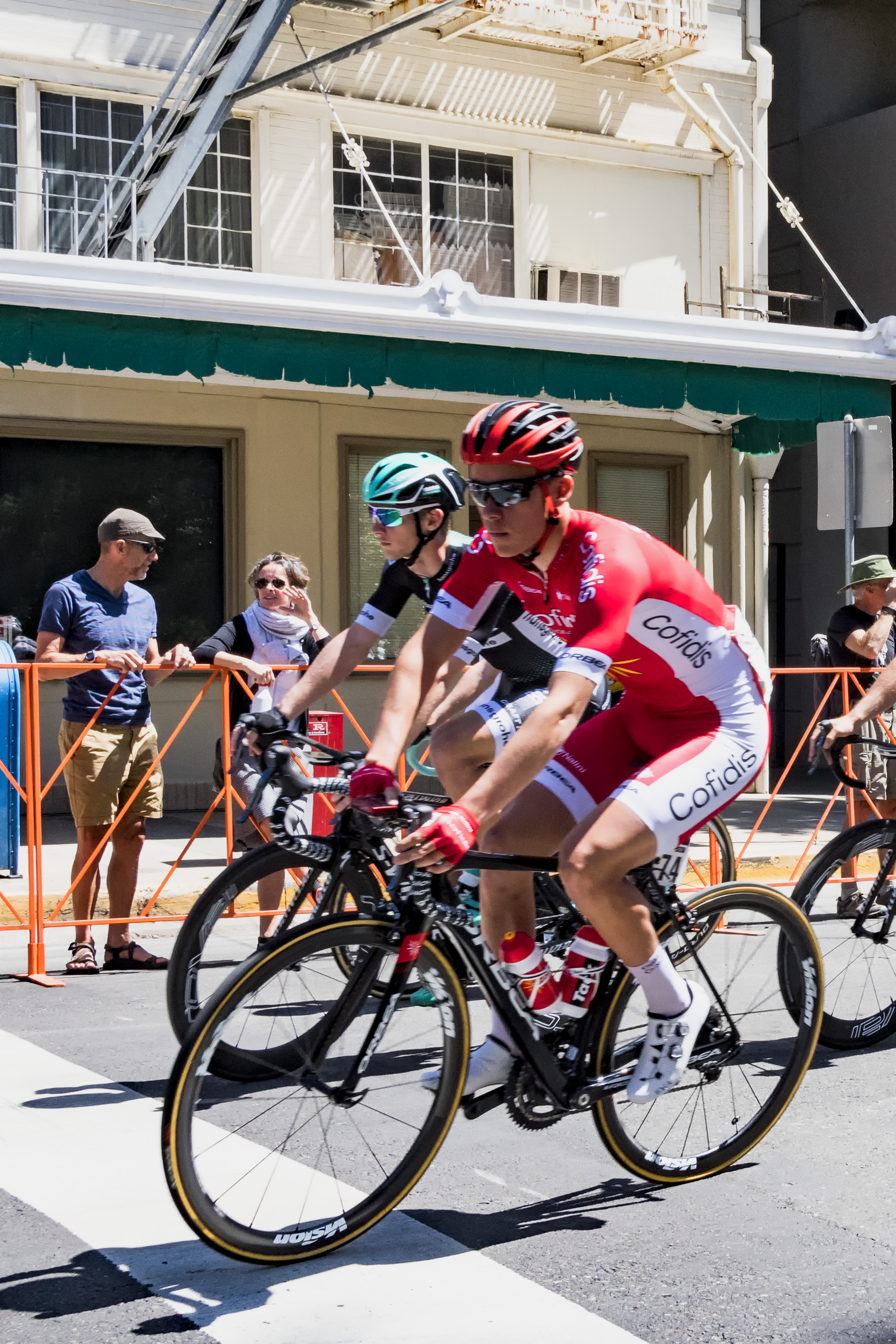

Personal information
- Full name: Mathias Le Turnier
- Born: 14 March 1995 (age 31) Audenge, France

Cycling career
- Sport: Cycling
- Current team: CIC Pro Cycling Academy
- Discipline: Road
- Role: Rider

Amateur teams
- 2012: VC Bazas Bernos-Beaulac Junior
- 2013: CC Périgueux Dordogne Junior
- 2014–2016: Océane Top 16

Professional teams
- 2016: Cofidis (stagiaire)
- 2017–2020: Cofidis
- 2021: Delko
- 2022–: Team UC Nantes Atlantique

Mathias Le Turnier (born 14 March 1995) is a French cyclist, who currently rides for UCI Continental Team CIC Pro Cycling Academy. In August 2018, he was named in the startlist for the Vuelta a España. In October 2020, he was named in the startlist for the 2020 Giro d'Italia.

== Major results ==
2016
2nd Overall Ronde de l'Isard
2nd Overall Tour de Gironde
2017
7th Tour du Doubs
2018
6th Overall Tour La Provence

1st Young rider classification

2019
10th Overall Tour du Haut Var

1st Young rider classification

10th Overall Tour de Hongrie

=== Grand Tour general classification results timeline ===
Grand Tour	2018	2019	2020
Giro d'Italia	—	—	80
Tour de France	—	—	—
Vuelta a España	110	—	—

Legend
—	Did not compete
DNF	Did not finish
