= 2016 Tour La Provence =

2016 UCI Europe Tour

Race details
- Dates: 23 February–25 February 2016
- Stages: 3
- Distance: 527 km (327.5 mi)
- Winning time: 13h 32' 57"

Results
Jersey awarded to the overall winner	Winner	Thomas Voeckler (FRA)	(Direct Énergie)
	Second	Petr Vakoč (CZE)	(Etixx–Quick-Step)
	Third	Lilian Calmejane (FRA)	(Direct Énergie)
	Mountains	Rémy Di Gregorio (FRA)	
Jersey awarded to the youth classification winner	Youth	Petr Vakoč (CZE)	(Etixx–Quick-Step)
	Team	Etixx–Quick-Step	

The 2016 Tour La Provence was a road cycling stage race that took place between 23 and 25 February 2016. The race was rated as a 2.1 event as part of the 2016 UCI Europe Tour, and was the first edition of the Tour La Provence.

== Teams ==
Eighteen teams of up to eight riders started the race:

UCI WorldTeams

- AG2R La Mondiale
- FDJ
- BMC Racing Team
- Etixx–Quick-Step
- Team Katusha
- Cannondale

UCI Professional Continental teams

- Androni Giocattoli–Sidermec
- Delko–Marseille Provence KTM
- Fortuneo–Vital Concept
- Cofidis
- Direct Énergie
- Wanty–Groupe Gobert

UCI Continental teams

- Armée de Terre
- Roubaix–Métropole Européenne de Lille
- Wallonie-Bruxelles–Group Protect
- HP BTP–Auber93
- Verandas Willems

National team

- France U23

== Route ==
Stage characteristics and winners
Stage	Date	Course	Distance	Type	Stage winner
1	23 February	Aubagne to Cassis	169 km (105 mi)	Hilly stage	Thomas Voeckler (FRA)
2	24 February	Miramas to Istres	185 km (115 mi)	Hilly stage	Davide Martinelli (ITA)
3	25 February	La Ciotat to Marseille	173 km (107 mi)	Hilly stage	Fernando Gaviria (COL)

== Final ranking ==
Final general classification

Rank	Rider	Team	Time
1	Thomas Voeckler (FRA)	Direct Énergie	13h 32' 57"
2	Petr Vakoč (CZE)	Etixx–Quick-Step	+ 7"
3	Lilian Calmejane (FRA)	Direct Énergie	+ 9"
4	Pieter Serry (BEL)	Etixx–Quick-Step	s.t.
5	Chris Anker Sørensen (DEN)	Fortuneo–Vital Concept	s.t.
6	Alessandro De Marchi (ITA)	BMC Racing Team	+ 12"
7	Sergey Chernetskiy (RUS)	Team Katusha	+ 14"
8	Jan Bakelants (BEL)	AG2R La Mondiale	s.t.
9	Francesco Gavazzi (ITA)	Androni Giocattoli–Sidermec	s.t.
10	Anthony Roux (FRA)	FDJ	s.t.
