= Lilian Calmejane =

French cyclist (born 1992)

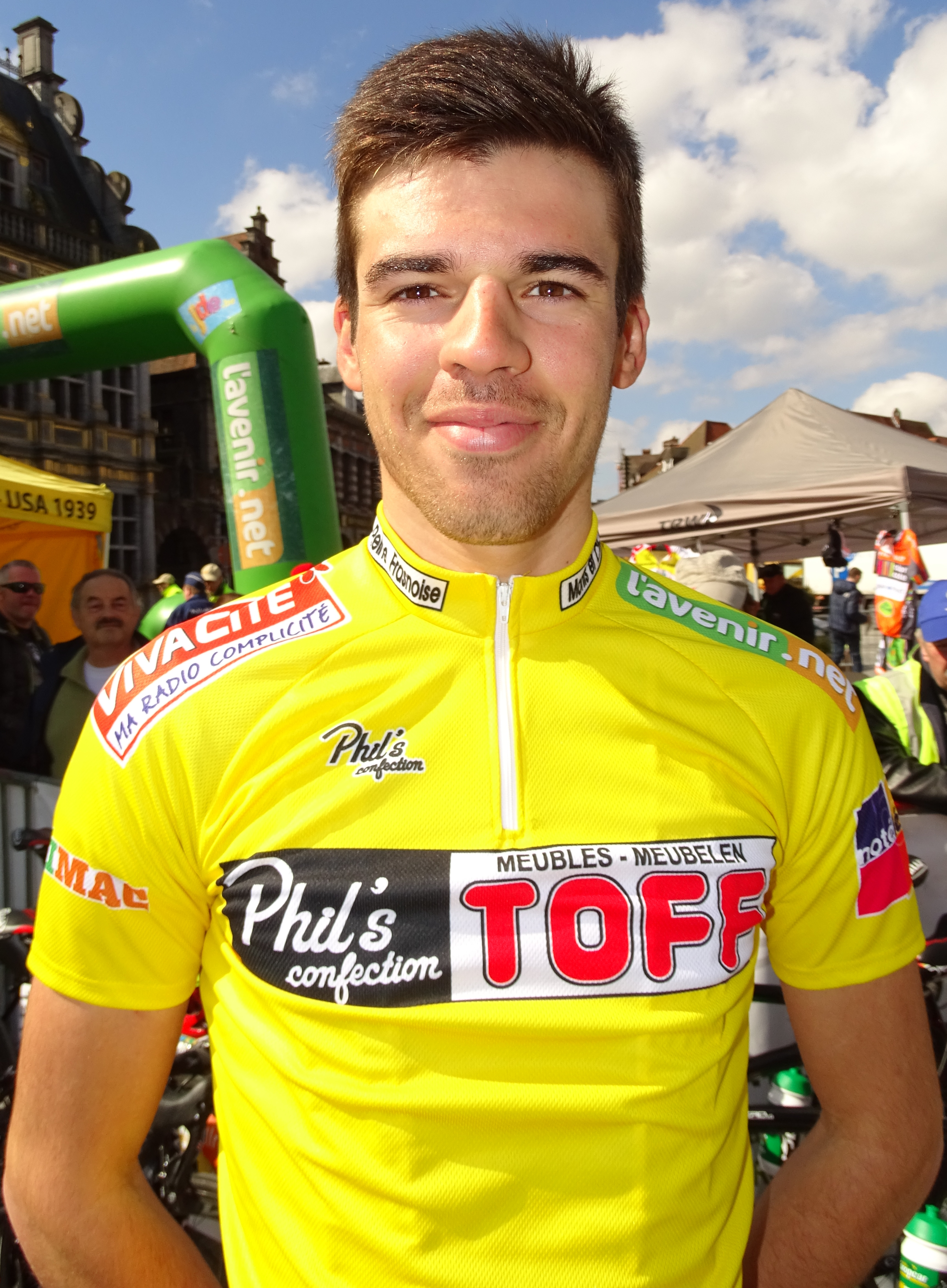
- Calmejane in 2015

Personal information
- Full name: Lilian Calmejane
- Born: 6 December 1992 (age 33) Albi, France
- Height: 1.84 m (6 ft 1/2 in)
- Weight: 69 kg (152 lb; 10 st 12 lb)

Cycling career
- Sport: Cycling
- Discipline: Road
- Role: Rider
- Rider type: Puncheur

Amateur teams
- 2010: Saint-Juéry Olympique
- 2011–2013: Occitane CF
- 2014–2015: Vendée U

Professional teams
- 2016–2020: Direct Énergie
- 2021–2022: AG2R Citroën Team
- 2023–2024: Intermarché–Circus–Wanty

Major wins
- Grand Tours Tour de France 1 individual stage (2017) Vuelta a España 1 individual stage (2016)

Lilian Calmejane (born 6 December 1992) is a French former professional road cyclist. He is best known for winning stages at the Tour de France in 2017 and the Vuelta a España in 2016.

== Career ==
Born in Albi, Calmejane turned professional in 2016 with Direct Énergie, and in August, he won the fourth stage of the Vuelta a España, his first ride in a Grand Tour.

In 2017, the second win of his career came at the Étoile de Bessèges where he won stage 3 and the overall race. At the start of March, Calmejane won the Mountains classification at Paris–Nice. His great form continued at the Settimana Internazionale di Coppi e Bartali where he won stage 4 and the overall race. He finished off his strong spring with a stage win and the overall win at the Circuit Cycliste Sarthe – Pays de la Loire. In June, he was named in the startlist for the Tour de France. He achieved his first Tour de France stage victory after making a solo breakaway with 17 kilometres (11 miles) to go on Stage 8, despite battling leg cramps 5 kilometres (3.1 miles) from the finish line.

In February 2018, Calmejane won La Drôme Classic, before he triumphed at Paris–Camembert in April.

In August 2020, Calmejane signed a one-year contract with the AG2R Citroën Team for the 2021 season.

== Major results ==
2014
4th Overall Ronde de l'Isard Ariege

1st Stages 2 & 3 (TTT)

2015
1st Overall Le Triptyque des Monts et Châteaux

1st Stage 2

5th Overall Tour de Bretagne

1st Stage 3

8th Overall Tour Alsace

1st Mountains classification

2016 (1 pro win)
1st Stage 4 Vuelta a España
3rd Overall Tour La Provence
8th Overall La Méditerranéenne

1st Young rider classification

8th Tour du Finistère
10th La Drôme Classic
2017 (7)
1st Overall Settimana Internazionale di Coppi e Bartali

1st Points classification
1st Stage 4

1st Overall Étoile de Bessèges

1st Stage 3

1st Overall Circuit de la Sarthe

1st Stage 3

Tour de France

1st Stage 8
Held after Stage 8
Combativity award Stages 3 & 8

1st Mountains classification, Paris–Nice
3rd Grand Prix d'Ouverture La Marseillaise
5th Overall Tour du Haut Var
6th Overall Tour du Limousin
9th Classic Sud-Ardèche
10th Overall Boucles de la Mayenne
10th Overall Tour du Poitou-Charentes
2018 (2)
1st Paris–Camembert
1st La Drôme Classic
3rd Classic Sud-Ardèche
3rd Grand Prix Cycliste la Marseillaise
5th Overall Tour La Provence
6th Overall Etoile de Bessèges
8th Overall Tour du Limousin
8th GP Miguel Induráin
9th Overall Tour de l'Ain
10th Tour du Finistère
2019 (2)
1st Classic Sud-Ardèche
1st Mountains classification, Tour de la Provence
2nd Overall Tour du Limousin

1st Stage 1

4th Overall Arctic Race of Norway
5th Grand Prix de Wallonie
5th Tro-Bro Léon
6th Grand Prix La Marseillaise
2020
1st Mountains classification, Route d'Occitanie
5th Overall Étoile de Bessèges
10th La Drôme Classic
2021
5th Classic Loire Atlantique
8th Grand Prix La Marseillaise
10th Grand Prix du Morbihan
2022
7th Tour du Jura
8th Route Adélie
9th Faun-Ardèche Classic
2023
1st Mountains classification, Tour de l'Ain
4th Trofeo Serra de Tramuntana
2024
Giro d'Italia

Held after Stage 1

=== Grand Tour general classification results timeline ===
Grand Tour	2016	2017	2018	2019	2020	2021	2022	2023	2024
Giro d'Italia	—	—	—	—	—	—	86	—	42
Tour de France	—	35	30	106	DNF	—	—	77	—
Vuelta a España	70	—	—	—	—	33	—	—	—

Legend
—	Did not compete
DNF	Did not finish
NH	Not held
