= Pélussin =

- Commune
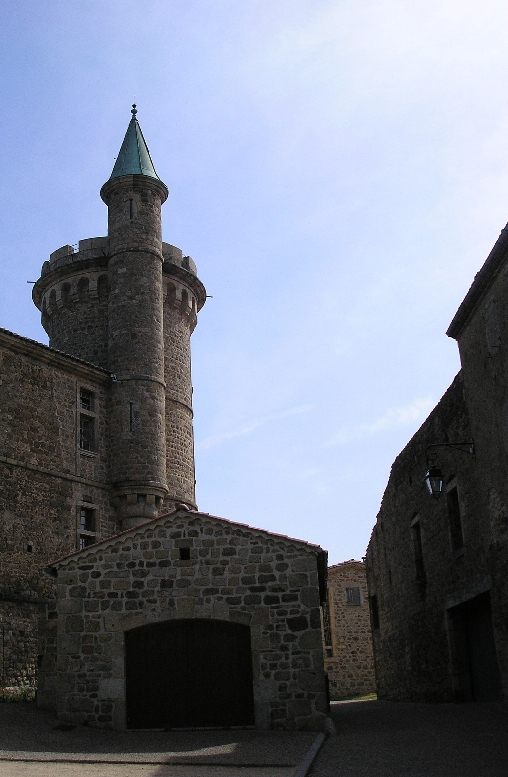
- Chateau

- Coat of arms
- Location of Pélussin
- Location within France Location within Auvergne-Rhône-Alpes
- Coordinates: 45°25′09″N 4°40′54″E
- Country: France
- Region: Auvergne-Rhône-Alpes
- Department: Loire
- Arrondissement: Saint-Étienne
- Canton: Le Pilat
- Intercommunality: Pilat rhodanien

Government
  - Mayor (2020–2026): Michel Devrieux
- Area^{1}: 32.16 km^{2} (12.42 sq mi)
- Elevation: 417 m (1,368 ft)
- Highest elevation: 1,340 m (4,400 ft)
- Lowest elevation: 240 m (790 ft)
- Population (2023): 3,727
  - Density: 115.9/km^{2} (300.2/sq mi)
- Time zone: UTC+01:00 (CET)
  - Summer (DST): UTC+02:00 (CEST)
- INSEE/Postal code: 42168 /42410
- ^{1} French Land Register data, which excludes lakes, ponds, glaciers > 1 km^{2} (0.386 sq mi or 247 acres) and river estuaries.

Pélussin (French pronunciation: [pelysɛ̃]) is a commune in the Loire department in central France. Pélussin is made up of three districts: Notre-Dame, Les Croix and at the very top, Virieu.

== Population ==
Historical population

Year	Pop.	±% p.a.
1793	3,120	—
1821	3,194	+0.08%
1846	3,651	+0.54%
1872	3,564	−0.09%
1901	3,111	−0.47%
1926	3,272	+0.20%
1946	2,617	−1.11%
1962	2,591	−0.06%
1968	2,608	+0.11%

Year	Pop.	±% p.a.
1975	2,600	−0.04%
1982	2,785	+0.99%
1990	3,132	+1.48%
1999	3,356	+0.77%
2007	3,434	+0.29%
2012	3,592	+0.90%
2017	3,765	+0.95%
2023	3,727	−0.17%

Source: EHESS and INSEE (1968-2023)

== See also ==
- Communes of the Loire department
