= Orsonville =

- Commune
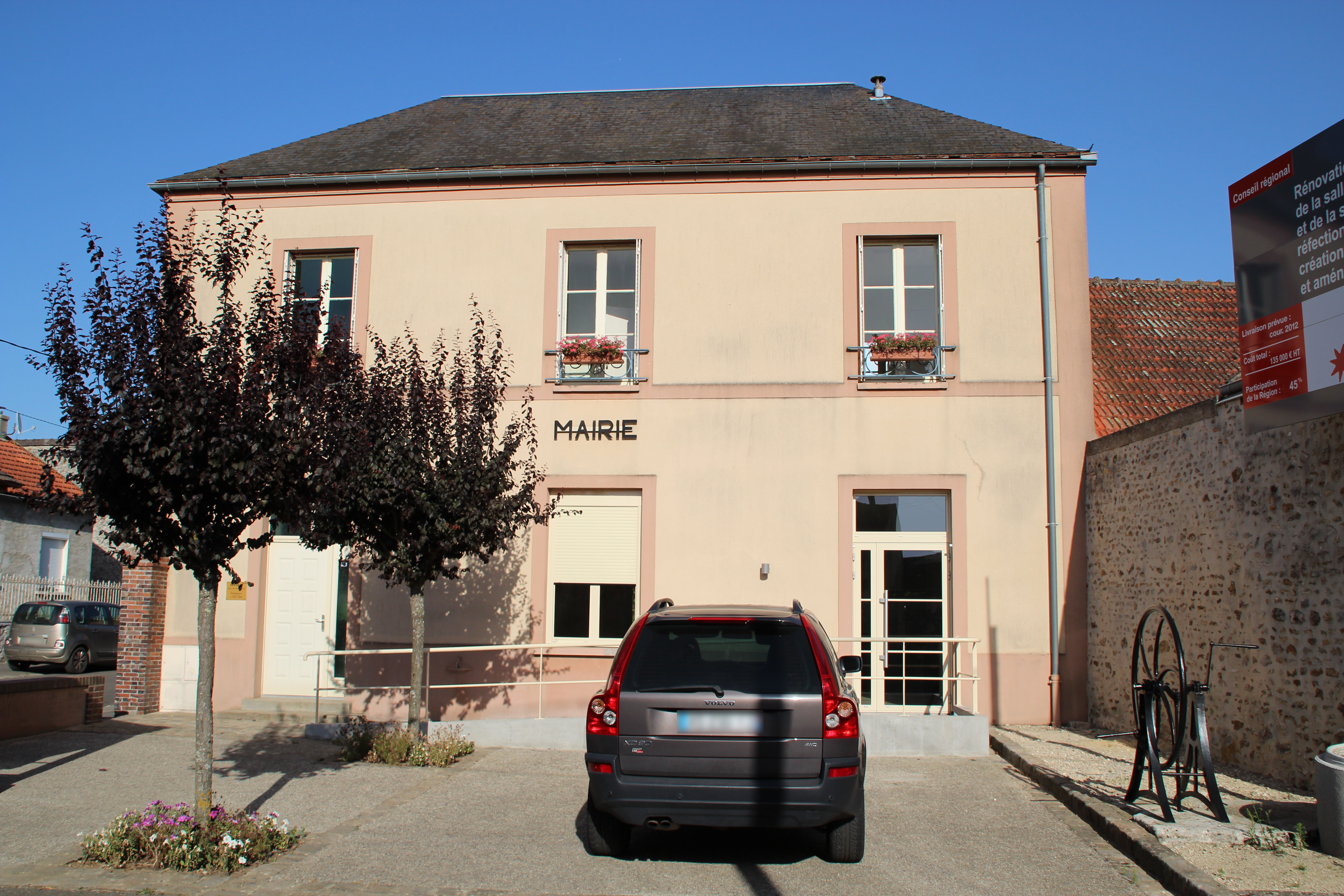
- The town hall in Orsonville
- Location of Orsonville
- Location within France Location within Île-de-France (region)
- Coordinates: 48°28′43″N 1°50′09″E
- Country: France
- Region: Île-de-France
- Department: Yvelines
- Arrondissement: Rambouillet
- Canton: Rambouillet
- Intercommunality: CA Rambouillet Territoires

Government
  - Mayor (2020–2026): Anne Cabrit
- Area^{1}: 9.61 km^{2} (3.71 sq mi)
- Elevation: 150 m (490 ft)
- Highest elevation: 159 m (522 ft)
- Lowest elevation: 140 m (460 ft)
- Population (2023): 325
  - Density: 33.8/km^{2} (87.6/sq mi)
- Time zone: UTC+01:00 (CET)
  - Summer (DST): UTC+02:00 (CEST)
- INSEE/Postal code: 78472 /78660
- ^{1} French Land Register data, which excludes lakes, ponds, glaciers > 1 km^{2} (0.386 sq mi or 247 acres) and river estuaries.

Orsonville (French pronunciation: [ɔʁsɔ̃vil]) is a commune in the Yvelines department in the Île-de-France region in north-central France.

== See also ==
- Communes of the Yvelines department
