= Alexandre Geniez =

French cyclist

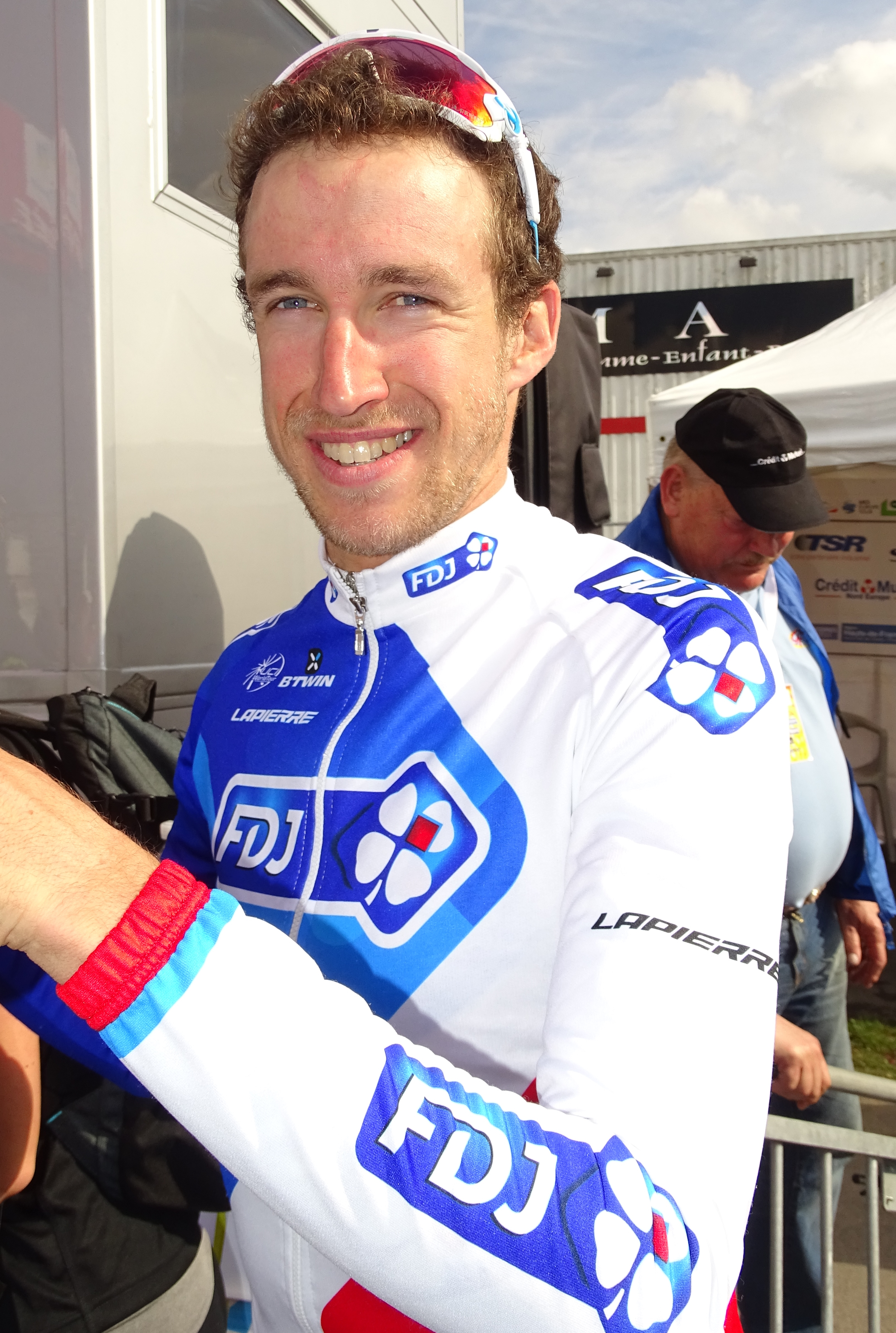
- Geniez at the 2016 Grand Prix de Denain

Personal information
- Full name: Alexandre Geniez
- Born: 16 April 1988 (age 38) Rodez, France
- Height: 1.83 m (6 ft 0 in)
- Weight: 68 kg (150 lb; 10.7 st)

Cycling career
- Sport: Cycling
- Current team: Retired
- Discipline: Road
- Role: Rider
- Rider type: Climber

Amateur teams
- 2008: GSC Blagnac
- 2009: Vélo-Club La Pomme Marseille

Professional teams
- 2010–2012: Skil–Shimano
- 2013–2016: FDJ
- 2017–2020: AG2R La Mondiale
- 2021–2022: Total Direct Énergie

Major wins
- Grand Tours Vuelta a España 3 individual stages (2013, 2016, 2018) One-day races and Classics Tre Valli Varesine (2017)

Alexandre Geniez (born 16 April 1988) is a French former professional cyclist, who competed as a professional from 2010 to 2022.

In March 2022 Geniez was convicted of domestic violence charges and given a four month suspended prison sentence. On 31 May 2022 Team TotalEnergies terminated his contract effective immediately.

== Career ==
One of his prestigious feats was winning the white jersey awarded to the best young rider in the 2011 Tour de Luxembourg.

Geniez left Argos–Shimano at the end of the 2012 season, and joined FDJ for the 2013 season.

In April 2015, Geniez won the Tro Bro Leon, a race cycled on asphalt and sandy roads, outsprinting four breakaway companions to accomplish the feat.

In August 2020, Geniez signed a two-year contract with the Total Direct Énergie team, from the 2021 season.

== Major results ==
2009
1st Overall Ronde de l'Isard
2nd Overall Tour de Gironde
7th Overall Giro della Valle d'Aosta

1st Stage 4

2010
2nd Overall Route du Sud
6th Les Boucles du Sud-Ardèche
7th Overall Tour de Luxembourg
2011
1st Stage 4 Tour of Austria
2nd Overall Tour de Luxembourg

1st Young rider classification

4th Overall Critérium International
5th Overall Circuit de la Sarthe
5th Overall Vuelta a Murcia
2012
8th Overall Circuit de la Sarthe
9th Overall Tour de Pologne
2013
1st Stage 15 Vuelta a España
9th Overall Tour Méditerranéen
2014
4th Overall Volta ao Algarve
2015
1st Overall Tour de l'Ain

1st Stage 3

1st Tro-Bro Léon
4th Tour du Finistère
9th Overall Giro d'Italia
9th Tour du Doubs
Combativity award Stage 20 Tour de France
2016
Vuelta a España

1st Stage 3
Held after Stages 3–4
Held after Stages 3–7

3rd Tour du Finistère
6th Overall Tour de l'Ain

1st Stage 4

7th Overall La Méditerranéenne

1st Stage 1 (TTT)

9th Overall Critérium International
2017
1st Tre Valli Varesine
3rd Overall Tour de l'Ain

1st Points classification
1st Stage 4

3rd Overall Tour La Provence

1st Stage 2

Combativity award Stage 3 Vuelta a España
2018
1st Overall Tour La Provence

1st Prologue

1st Grand Prix La Marseillaise
1st Stage 12 Vuelta a España
2019
1st Stage 2 Tour de l'Ain
8th Classic Loire Atlantique
2022
Tour du Rwanda

1st Prologue & Stage 5

8th Overall Saudi Tour

=== Grand Tour general classification results timeline ===
| Grand Tour | 2011 | 2012 | 2013 | 2014 | 2015 | 2016 | 2017 | 2018 | 2019 | 2020 |
|---|---|---|---|---|---|---|---|---|---|---|
| Giro d'Italia | — | — | — | 13 | 9 | DNF | DNF | 11 | — | — |
| Tour de France | — | — | 44 | — | 112 | — | — | — | — | — |
| Vuelta a España | 158 | 90 | 47 | — | — | 108 | DNF | 90 | — | DNF |

Legend
| — | Did not compete |
| DNF | Did not finish |
