= Grand Prix La Marseillaise =

French one-day road cycling race

Race details
- Date: Late January; Early February
- Region: South France
- Local name: Grand Prix d'Ouverture La Marseillaise (in French)
- Discipline: Road race
- Competition: UCI Europe Tour 1.1
- Type: One-day race
- Organiser: La Marseillaise
- Web site: www.lamarseillaise.fr/le-gran-prix-cyclisme-la-marseillaise/

History
- First edition: 1980
- Editions: 47 (as of 2026)
- First winner: Leo van Vliet (NED)
- Most wins: Eddy Planckaert (BEL); Edwig Van Hooydonck (BEL); Baden Cooke (AUS) (2 times)
- Most recent: Bryan Coquard (FRA)

Grand Prix Cycliste La Marseillaise, formerly known as the Grand Prix d'Ouverture La Marseillaise, is a single-day road bicycle race held annually in February around the city of Marseille, France. Since 2005, the race is organized as a 1.1 event on the UCI Europe Tour. It is usually the first race of the European calendar, one day before the stage-race Étoile de Bessèges, which is held in the same region.

== Winners ==
Year	Country	Rider	Team
1980	Netherlands	Leo van Vliet	TI–Raleigh
1981	Belgium	Jan Bogaert	Vermeer Thijs
1982	France	Bernard Hinault	Renault–Elf
1983	Netherlands	Jan Raas	TI–Raleigh
1984	Belgium	Eddy Planckaert	Panasonic–Raleigh
1985	France	Charly Mottet	Renault–Elf
1986	Belgium	Eddy Planckaert	Panasonic–Merckx–Agu
1987	Denmark	Johnny Weltz	Fagor
1988	Netherlands	Ad Wijnands	Superconfex–Yoko–Opel–Colnago
1989	France	Thierry Claveyrolat	RMO
1990	Belgium	Etienne De Wilde	Histor–Sigma
1991	Belgium	Edwig Van Hooydonck	Buckler–Colnago–Decca
1992	Belgium	Edwig Van Hooydonck	Buckler–Colnago–Decca
1993	France	Didier Rous	GAN
1994	France	Gilles Delion	Castorama
1995	Belgium	Stéphane Hennebert	Le Groupement
1996	Italy	Fabiano Fontanelli	MG Maglificio–Technogym
1997	France	Richard Virenque	Festina–Lotus
1998	Italy	Marco Saligari	Casino–Ag2r
1999	Belgium	Frank Vandenbroucke	Cofidis
2000	France	Emmanuel Magnien	Française des Jeux
2001	Denmark	Jacob Piil	CSC–Tiscali
2002	France	Xavier Jan	BigMat–Auber 93
2003	Belgium	Ludo Dierckxsens	Landbouwkrediet–Colnago
2004	Australia	Baden Cooke	FDJeux.com
2005	Denmark	Nicki Sørensen	Team CSC
2006	Australia	Baden Cooke	Unibet.com
2007	Great Britain	Jeremy Hunt	Unibet.com
2008	France	Hervé Duclos-Lassalle	Cofidis
2009	France	Rémi Pauriol	Cofidis
2010	France	Jonathan Hivert	Saur–Sojasun
2011	France	Jérémy Roy	FDJ
2012	France	Samuel Dumoulin	Cofidis
2013	France	Justin Jules	La Pomme Marseille
2014	Belgium	Kenneth Vanbilsen	Topsport Vlaanderen–Baloise
2015	Netherlands	Pim Ligthart	Lotto–Soudal
2016	Belgium	Dries Devenyns	IAM Cycling
2017	France	Arthur Vichot	FDJ
2018	France	Alexandre Geniez	AG2R La Mondiale
2019	France	Anthony Turgis	Direct Énergie
2020	France	Benoît Cosnefroy	AG2R La Mondiale
2021	France	Aurélien Paret-Peintre	AG2R Citroën Team
2022	Belgium	Amaury Capiot	Arkéa–Samsic
2023	United States	Neilson Powless	EF Education–EasyPost
2024	Luxembourg	Kevin Geniets	Groupama–FDJ
2025	France	Valentin Ferron	Cofidis
2026	France	Bryan Coquard	Cofidis

=== Winners by nationality ===
# of Victories	Country
21	France
12	Belgium
4	Netherlands
3	Denmark
2	Australia
2	Italy
1	Luxembourg
1	United Kingdom
1	United States
