= 2023 Paris–Nice =

French cycling race

2023 UCI World Tour, race 6 of 35
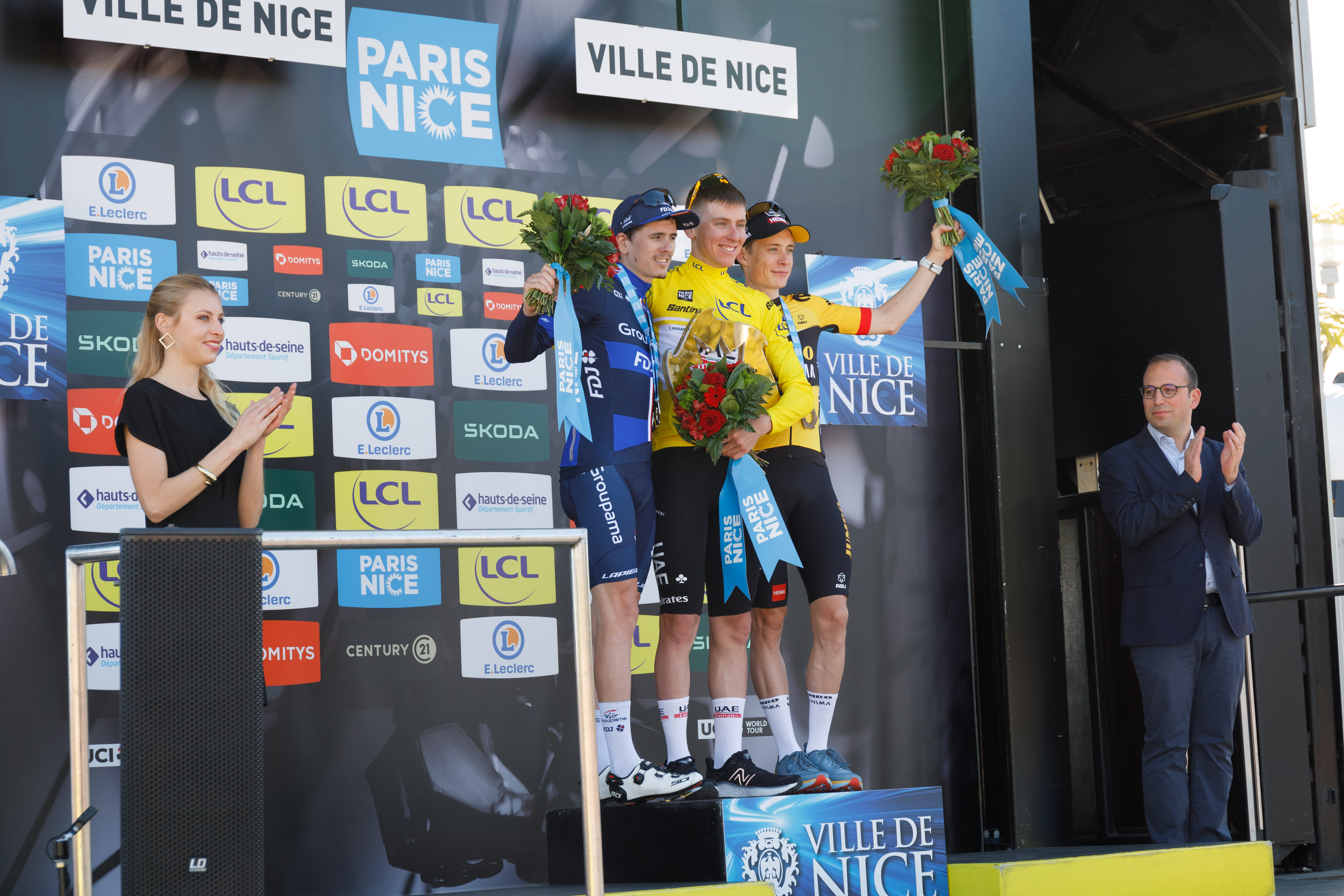
- The final podium

Race details
- Dates: 5–12 March 2023
- Stages: 8
- Distance: 1,201.1 km (746.3 mi)
- Winning time: 24h 01' 38"

Results
Jersey awarded to the overall winner	Winner	Tadej Pogačar (SLO)	(UAE Team Emirates)
	Second	David Gaudu (FRA)	(Groupama–FDJ)
	Third	Jonas Vingegaard (DEN)	(Team Jumbo–Visma)
Jersey awarded to the points classification winner	Points	Tadej Pogačar (SLO)	(UAE Team Emirates)
Jersey awarded to the mountains classification winner	Mountains	Jonas Gregaard (DEN)	(Uno-X Pro Cycling Team)
Jersey awarded to the young rider classification winner	Young rider	Tadej Pogačar (SLO)	(UAE Team Emirates)
	Team	(Australia) Team Jayco–AlUla	

The 2023 Paris–Nice was a road cycling stage race that took place between 5 and 12 March 2023 in France. It was the 81st edition of Paris–Nice and the sixth race of the 2023 UCI World Tour.

== Teams ==
All 18 UCI WorldTeams and four UCI ProTeams made up the 22 teams that participated in the race.

UCI WorldTeams

- AG2R Citroën Team
- Alpecin–Deceuninck
- Arkéa–Samsic
- Astana Qazaqstan Team
- Bora–Hansgrohe
- Cofidis
- EF Education–EasyPost
- Groupama–FDJ
- INEOS Grenadiers
- Intermarché–Circus–Wanty
- Movistar Team
- Soudal–Quick-Step
- Team Bahrain Victorious
- Team DSM
- Team Jayco–AlUla
- Team Jumbo–Visma
- Trek–Segafredo
- UAE Team Emirates

UCI ProTeams

- Israel–Premier Tech
- Lotto–Dstny
- Team TotalEnergies
- Uno-X Pro Cycling Team

== Route ==
Stage characteristics and winners
Stage	Date	Course	Distance	Type	Stage winner
1	5 March	La Verrière to La Verrière	169.4 km (105.3 mi)	Flat stage	Tim Merlier (BEL)
2	6 March	Bazainville to Fontainebleau	163.7 km (101.7 mi)	Flat stage	Mads Pedersen (DEN)
3	7 March	Dampierre-en-Burly to Dampierre-en-Burly	32.2 km (20.0 mi)	Team time trial	(Netherlands) Team Jumbo–Visma
4	8 March	Saint-Amand-Montrond to La Loge des Gardes	164.7 km (102.3 mi)	Intermediate stage	Tadej Pogačar (SLO)
5	9 March	Saint-Symphorien-sur-Coise to Saint-Paul-Trois-Châteaux	212.4 km (132.0 mi)	Flat stage	Olav Kooij (NED)
6	10 March	~~Tourves to La Colle-sur-Loup~~	~~197.4 km (122.7 mi)~~ (Note: Stage 6 was cancelled due to the strong winds blowing in the region to preserve the safety of the riders. The start was initially moved from Tourves to Fontaine d'Aragon, reducing the stage distance from 224 km (139 mi) to 72.25 km (45 mi) before later being cancelled altogether..)	~~Hilly stage~~	Stage Cancelled
7	11 March	Nice to Col de la Couillole	142.9 km (88.8 mi)	Mountain stage	Tadej Pogačar (SLO)
8	12 March	Nice to Nice	118.4 km (73.6 mi)	Mountain stage	Tadej Pogačar (SLO)
Total			1,201.1 km (746.3 mi)		

== Stages ==
=== Stage 1 ===
5 March 2023 — La Verrière to La Verrière, 169.4 km (105.3 mi)

Stage 1 Result (1–10)
Rank	Rider	Team	Time
1	Tim Merlier (BEL)	Soudal–Quick-Step	3h 50' 52"
2	Sam Bennett (IRL)	Bora–Hansgrohe	+ 0"
3	Mads Pedersen (DEN)	Trek–Segafredo	+ 0"
4	Olav Kooij (NED)	Team Jumbo–Visma	+ 0"
5	Arnaud De Lie (BEL)	Lotto–Dstny	+ 0"
6	Michael Matthews (AUS)	Team Jayco–AlUla	+ 0"
7	Bryan Coquard (FRA)	Cofidis	+ 0"
8	Iván García Cortina (ESP)	Movistar Team	+ 0"
9	Kaden Groves (AUS)	Alpecin–Deceuninck	+ 0"
10	Arnaud Démare (FRA)	Groupama–FDJ	+ 0"

General classification after Stage 1 (1–10)
Rank	Rider	Team	Time
1	Tim Merlier (BEL)	Soudal–Quick-Step	3h 50' 42"
2	Sam Bennett (IRL)	Bora–Hansgrohe	+ 4"
3	Tadej Pogačar (SLO)	UAE Team Emirates	+ 4"
4	Mads Pedersen (DEN)	Trek–Segafredo	+ 6"
5	Pierre Latour (FRA)	Team TotalEnergies	+ 10"
6	Dorian Godon (FRA)	AG2R Citroën Team	+ 10"
7	Olav Kooij (NED)	Team Jumbo–Visma	+ 10"
8	Arnaud De Lie (BEL)	Lotto–Dstny	+ 10"
9	Michael Matthews (AUS)	Team Jayco–AlUla	+ 10"
10	Bryan Coquard (FRA)	Cofidis	+ 10"

=== Stage 2 ===
6 March 2023 – Bazainville to Fontainebleau, 163.7 km (101.7 mi)

Stage 2 Result (1–10)
Rank	Rider	Team	Time
1	Mads Pedersen (DEN)	Trek–Segafredo	3h 28' 57"
2	Olav Kooij (NED)	Team Jumbo–Visma	+ 0"
3	Magnus Cort (DEN)	EF Education–EasyPost	+ 0"
4	Daniel McLay (GBR)	Arkéa–Samsic	+ 0"
5	Lionel Taminiaux (BEL)	Alpecin–Deceuninck	+ 0"
6	Michael Matthews (AUS)	Team Jayco–AlUla	+ 0"
7	Marijn van den Berg (NED)	EF Education–EasyPost	+ 0"
8	Cees Bol (NED)	Astana Qazaqstan Team	+ 0"
9	Alexis Renard (FRA)	Cofidis	+ 0"
10	Arnaud Démare (FRA)	Groupama–FDJ	+ 0"

General classification after Stage 2 (1–10)
Rank	Rider	Team	Time
1	Mads Pedersen (DEN)	Trek–Segafredo	7h 19' 35"
2	Tadej Pogačar (SLO)	UAE Team Emirates	+ 2"
3	Tim Merlier (BEL)	Soudal–Quick-Step	+ 4"
4	Olav Kooij (NED)	Team Jumbo–Visma	+ 8"
5	Sam Bennett (IRL)	Bora–Hansgrohe	+ 8"
6	Michael Matthews (AUS)	Team Jayco–AlUla	+ 10"
7	Magnus Cort (DEN)	EF Education–EasyPost	+ 10"
8	Pierre Latour (FRA)	Team TotalEnergies	+ 10"
9	Dorian Godon (FRA)	AG2R Citroën Team	+ 12"
10	Nathan Van Hooydonck (BEL)	Team Jumbo–Visma	+ 12"

=== Stage 3 ===
7 March 2023 – Dampierre-en-Burly to Dampierre-en-Burly, 32.2 km (20.0 mi) (TTT)

Stage 3 Result (1–10)
Rank	Team	Time
1	(Netherlands) Team Jumbo–Visma	33' 55"
2	(United States) EF Education–EasyPost	+ 1"
3	(Australia) Team Jayco–AlUla	+ 4"
4	(France) Groupama–FDJ	+ 14"
5	(United Arab Emirates) UAE Team Emirates	+ 23"
6	(Germany) Bora–Hansgrohe	+ 25"
7	(Belgium) Soudal–Quick-Step	+ 39"
8	(United States) Trek–Segafredo	+ 45"
9	Team Bahrain Victorious	+ 47"
10	(United Kingdom) INEOS Grenadiers	+ 48"

General classification after Stage 3 (1–10)
Rank	Rider	Team	Time
1	Magnus Cort (DEN)	EF Education–EasyPost	7h 53' 41"
2	Nathan Van Hooydonck (BEL)	Team Jumbo–Visma	+ 1"
3	Michael Matthews (AUS)	Team Jayco–AlUla	+ 3"
4	Jan Tratnik (SLO)	Team Jumbo–Visma	+ 3"
5	Jonas Vingegaard (DEN)	Team Jumbo–Visma	+ 3"
6	Simon Yates (GBR)	Team Jayco–AlUla	+ 7"
7	Neilson Powless (USA)	EF Education–EasyPost	+ 8"
8	Tobias Foss (NOR)	Team Jumbo–Visma	+ 8"
9	Kelland O'Brien (AUS)	Team Jayco–AlUla	+ 11"
10	Tadej Pogačar (SLO)	UAE Team Emirates	+ 14"

=== Stage 4 ===
8 March 2023 – Saint-Amand-Montrond to La Loge des Gardes, 164.7 km (102.3 mi)

Stage 4 Result (1–10)
Rank	Rider	Team	Time
1	Tadej Pogačar (SLO)	UAE Team Emirates	4h 01' 17"
2	David Gaudu (FRA)	Groupama–FDJ	+ 1"
3	Gino Mäder (SUI)	Team Bahrain Victorious	+ 34"
4	Aurélien Paret-Peintre (FRA)	AG2R Citroën Team	+ 42"
5	Kévin Vauquelin (FRA)	Arkéa–Samsic	+ 43"
6	Jonas Vingegaard (DEN)	Team Jumbo–Visma	+ 43"
7	Romain Bardet (FRA)	Team DSM	+ 51"
8	Daniel Martínez (COL)	INEOS Grenadiers	+ 51"
9	Simon Yates (GBR)	Team Jayco–AlUla	+ 51"
10	Matteo Jorgenson (USA)	Movistar Team	+ 51"

General classification after Stage 4 (1–10)
Rank	Rider	Team	Time
1	Tadej Pogačar (SLO)	UAE Team Emirates	11h 55' 00"
2	David Gaudu (FRA)	Groupama–FDJ	+ 10"
3	Jonas Vingegaard (DEN)	Team Jumbo–Visma	+ 44"
4	Simon Yates (GBR)	Team Jayco–AlUla	+ 56"
5	Gino Mäder (SUI)	Team Bahrain Victorious	+ 1' 19"
6	Romain Bardet (FRA)	Team DSM	+ 1' 40"
7	Daniel Martínez (COL)	INEOS Grenadiers	+ 1' 40"
8	Matteo Jorgenson (USA)	Movistar Team	+ 1' 42"
9	Neilson Powless (USA)	EF Education–EasyPost	+ 1' 44"
10	Matteo Sobrero (ITA)	Team Jayco–AlUla	+ 1' 54"

=== Stage 5 ===
9 March 2023 – Saint-Symphorien-sur-Coise to Saint-Paul-Trois-Châteaux, 212.4 km (132.0 mi)

Stage 5 Result (1–10)
Rank	Rider	Team	Time
1	Olav Kooij (NED)	Team Jumbo–Visma	5h 59' 54"
2	Mads Pedersen (DEN)	Trek–Segafredo	+ 0"
3	Tim Merlier (BEL)	Soudal–Quick-Step	+ 0"
4	Matteo Trentin (ITA)	UAE Team Emirates	+ 0"
5	Max Kanter (GER)	Movistar Team	+ 0"
6	Bryan Coquard (FRA)	Cofidis	+ 0"
7	Sam Bennett (IRL)	Bora–Hansgrohe	+ 0"
8	Arne Marit (BEL)	Intermarché–Circus–Wanty	+ 0"
9	Hugo Page (FRA)	Intermarché–Circus–Wanty	+ 0"
10	Cees Bol (NED)	Astana Qazaqstan Team	+ 0"

General classification after Stage 5 (1–10)
Rank	Rider	Team	Time
1	Tadej Pogačar (SLO)	UAE Team Emirates	17h 14' 52"
2	David Gaudu (FRA)	Groupama–FDJ	+ 6"
3	Jonas Vingegaard (DEN)	Team Jumbo–Visma	+ 46"
4	Simon Yates (GBR)	Team Jayco–AlUla	+ 58"
5	Gino Mäder (SUI)	Team Bahrain Victorious	+ 1' 21"
6	Romain Bardet (FRA)	Team DSM	+ 1' 42"
7	Daniel Martínez (COL)	INEOS Grenadiers	+ 1' 42"
8	Matteo Jorgenson (USA)	Movistar Team	+ 1' 44"
9	Neilson Powless (USA)	EF Education–EasyPost	+ 1' 46"
10	Matteo Sobrero (ITA)	Team Jayco–AlUla	+ 1' 56"

=== Stage 6 ===
10 March 2023 – Tourves to La Colle-sur-Loup, 197.4 km (122.7 mi)

Stage cancelled to due dangerously high wind speeds in the area.

=== Stage 7 ===
11 March 2023 – Nice to Col de la Couillole, 142.9 km (88.8 mi)

Stage 7 Result (1–10)
Rank	Rider	Team	Time
1	Tadej Pogačar (SLO)	UAE Team Emirates	3h 56' 08"
2	David Gaudu (FRA)	Groupama–FDJ	+ 2"
3	Jonas Vingegaard (DEN)	Team Jumbo–Visma	+ 6"
4	Simon Yates (GBR)	Team Jayco–AlUla	+ 19"
5	Neilson Powless (USA)	EF Education–EasyPost	+ 24"
6	Gino Mäder (SUI)	Team Bahrain Victorious	+ 28"
7	Romain Bardet (FRA)	Team DSM	+ 30"
8	Pavel Sivakov (FRA)	INEOS Grenadiers	+ 38"
9	Matteo Jorgenson (USA)	Movistar Team	+ 38"
10	Pierre Latour (FRA)	Team TotalEnergies	+ 53"

General classification after Stage 7 (1–10)
Rank	Rider	Team	Time
1	Tadej Pogačar (SLO)	UAE Team Emirates	21h 10' 50"
2	David Gaudu (FRA)	Groupama–FDJ	+ 12"
3	Jonas Vingegaard (DEN)	Team Jumbo–Visma	+ 58"
4	Simon Yates (GBR)	Team Jayco–AlUla	+ 1' 27"
5	Gino Mäder (SUI)	Team Bahrain Victorious	+ 1' 59"
6	Neilson Powless (USA)	EF Education–EasyPost	+ 2' 20"
7	Romain Bardet (FRA)	Team DSM	+ 2' 22"
8	Matteo Jorgenson (USA)	Movistar Team	+ 2' 32"
9	Pavel Sivakov (FRA)	INEOS Grenadiers	+ 3' 08"
10	Pierre Latour (FRA)	Team TotalEnergies	+ 3' 17"

=== Stage 8 ===
12 March 2023 – Nice to Nice, 118.4 km (73.6 mi)

Stage 8 Result (1–10)
Rank	Rider	Team	Time
1	Tadej Pogačar (SLO)	UAE Team Emirates	2h 51' 02"
2	Jonas Vingegaard (DEN)	Team Jumbo–Visma	+ 33"
3	David Gaudu (FRA)	Groupama–FDJ	+ 33"
4	Simon Yates (GBR)	Team Jayco–AlUla	+ 33"
5	Matteo Jorgenson (USA)	Movistar Team	+ 33"
6	Neilson Powless (USA)	EF Education–EasyPost	+ 43"
7	Pavel Sivakov (FRA)	INEOS Grenadiers	+ 43"
8	Romain Bardet (FRA)	Team DSM	+ 43"
9	Jack Haig (AUS)	Team Bahrain Victorious	+ 43"
10	Gino Mäder (SUI)	Team Bahrain Victorious	+ 43"

General classification after Stage 8 (1–10)
Rank	Rider	Team	Time
1	Tadej Pogačar (SLO)	UAE Team Emirates	24h 01' 38"
2	David Gaudu (FRA)	Groupama–FDJ	+ 53"
3	Jonas Vingegaard (DEN)	Team Jumbo–Visma	+ 1' 39"
4	Simon Yates (GBR)	Team Jayco–AlUla	+ 2' 14"
5	Gino Mäder (SUI)	Team Bahrain Victorious	+ 2' 56"
6	Neilson Powless (USA)	EF Education–EasyPost	+ 3' 17"
7	Romain Bardet (FRA)	Team DSM	+ 3' 19"
8	Matteo Jorgenson (USA)	Movistar Team	+ 3' 19"
9	Pavel Sivakov (FRA)	INEOS Grenadiers	+ 4' 05"
10	Jack Haig (AUS)	Team Bahrain Victorious	+ 4' 56"

== Classification leadership table ==
Classification leadership by stage
Stage	Winner	General classification	Points classification	Mountains classification	Young rider classification	Team classification	Combativity award
1	Tim Merlier	Tim Merlier	Tim Merlier	Neilson Powless	Tadej Pogačar	Trek–Segafredo	Paul Ourselin
2	Mads Pedersen	Mads Pedersen	Mads Pedersen	Jonas Gregaard	Tadej Pogačar	EF Education–EasyPost	Jonas Gregaard
3	Team Jumbo–Visma	Magnus Cort	Mads Pedersen	Jonas Gregaard	Kelland O'Brien	Team Jumbo–Visma	not awarded
4	Tadej Pogačar	Tadej Pogačar	Tadej Pogačar	Jonas Gregaard	Tadej Pogačar	Team Jayco–AlUla	Lilian Calmejane
5	Olav Kooij	Tadej Pogačar	Mads Pedersen	Jonas Gregaard	Tadej Pogačar	Team Jayco–AlUla	Sandy Dujardin
6	stage cancelled	Tadej Pogačar	Mads Pedersen	Jonas Gregaard	Tadej Pogačar	Team Jayco–AlUla	stage cancelled
7	Tadej Pogačar	Tadej Pogačar	Tadej Pogačar	Jonas Gregaard	Tadej Pogačar	Team Jayco–AlUla	Kobe Goossens
8	Tadej Pogačar	Tadej Pogačar	Tadej Pogačar	Jonas Gregaard	Tadej Pogačar	Team Jayco–AlUla	Wouter Poels
Final		Tadej Pogačar	Tadej Pogačar	Jonas Gregaard	Tadej Pogačar	Team Jayco–AlUla	not awarded

== Classification standings ==
Legend
Denotes the winner of the general classification	Denotes the winner of the mountains classification
Denotes the winner of the points classification	Denotes the winner of the young rider classification
Denotes the winner of the team classification	Denotes the winner of the combativity award

=== General classification ===
Final general classification (1–10)
Rank	Rider	Team	Time
1	Tadej Pogačar (SLO)	UAE Team Emirates	24h 01' 38"
2	David Gaudu (FRA)	Groupama–FDJ	+ 53"
3	Jonas Vingegaard (DEN)	Team Jumbo–Visma	+ 1' 39"
4	Simon Yates (GBR)	Team Jayco–AlUla	+ 2' 14"
5	Gino Mäder (SUI)	Team Bahrain Victorious	+ 2' 56"
6	Neilson Powless (USA)	EF Education–EasyPost	+ 3' 17"
7	Romain Bardet (FRA)	Team DSM	+ 3' 19"
8	Matteo Jorgenson (USA)	Movistar Team	+ 3' 19"
9	Pavel Sivakov (FRA)	INEOS Grenadiers	+ 4' 05"
10	Jack Haig (AUS)	Team Bahrain Victorious	+ 4' 56"

=== Points classification ===
Final points classification (1–10)
Rank	Rider	Team	Time
1	Tadej Pogačar (SLO)	UAE Team Emirates	65
2	David Gaudu (FRA)	Groupama–FDJ	41
3	Olav Kooij (NED)	Team Jumbo–Visma	34
4	Jonas Vingegaard (DEN)	Team Jumbo–Visma	26
5	Simon Yates (GBR)	Team Jayco–AlUla	16
6	Gino Mäder (SUI)	Team Bahrain Victorious	15
7	Neilson Powless (USA)	EF Education–EasyPost	11
8	Romain Bardet (FRA)	Team DSM	11
9	Matteo Jorgenson (USA)	Movistar Team	9
10	Magnus Cort (DEN)	EF Education–EasyPost	9

=== Mountains classification ===
Final mountains classification (1–10)
Rank	Rider	Team	Time
1	Jonas Gregaard (DEN)	Uno-X Pro Cycling Team	45
2	Tadej Pogačar (SLO)	UAE Team Emirates	32
3	David Gaudu (FRA)	Groupama–FDJ	15
4	Pascal Eenkhoorn (NED)	Lotto–Dstny	11
5	Wout Poels (NED)	Team Bahrain Victorious	10
6	David de la Cruz (ESP)	Astana Qazaqstan Team	9
7	Sandy Dujardin (FRA)	Team TotalEnergies	8
8	Jonas Vingegaard (DEN)	Team Jumbo–Visma	5
9	Oliver Naesen (BEL)	AG2R Citroën Team	5
10	Anders Skaarseth (NOR)	Uno-X Pro Cycling Team	5

=== Young rider classification ===
Final young rider classification (1–10)
Rank	Rider	Team	Time
1	Tadej Pogačar (SLO)	UAE Team Emirates	24h 01' 38"
2	Matteo Jorgenson (USA)	Movistar Team	+ 3' 19"
3	Kévin Vauquelin (FRA)	Arkéa–Samsic	+ 14' 52"
4	Michel Ries (LUX)	Arkéa–Samsic	+ 35' 50"
5	Anthon Charmig (DEN)	Uno-X Pro Cycling Team	+ 41' 20"
6	Kevin Vermaerke (BEL)	Team DSM	+ 43' 04"
7	Clément Champoussin (FRA)	Arkéa–Samsic	+ 43' 16"
8	Matis Louvel (FRA)	Arkéa–Samsic	+ 51' 26"
9	Matthew Dinham (AUS)	Team DSM	+ 51' 48"
10	Brent Van Moer (BEL)	Lotto–Dstny	+ 51' 48"

=== Teams classification ===
Final team classification (1–10)
Rank	Team	Time
1	(Australia) Team Jayco–AlUla	71h 18' 58"
2	Team Bahrain Victorious	+ 10' 12"
3	(France) Groupama–FDJ	+ 16' 43"
4	(France) AG2R Citroën Team	+ 20' 19"
5	(Netherlands) Team Jumbo–Visma	+ 32' 09"
6	(United Kingdom) INEOS Grenadiers	+ 34' 02"
7	(Spain) Movistar Team	+ 40' 51"
8	(Belgium) Intermarché–Circus–Wanty	+ 48' 01"
9	(Kazakhstan) Astana Qazaqstan Team	+ 49' 33"
10	(Netherlands) Team DSM	+ 51' 16"
