= 2017 Paris–Nice =

Cycling race

2017 UCI World Tour, race 6 of 37
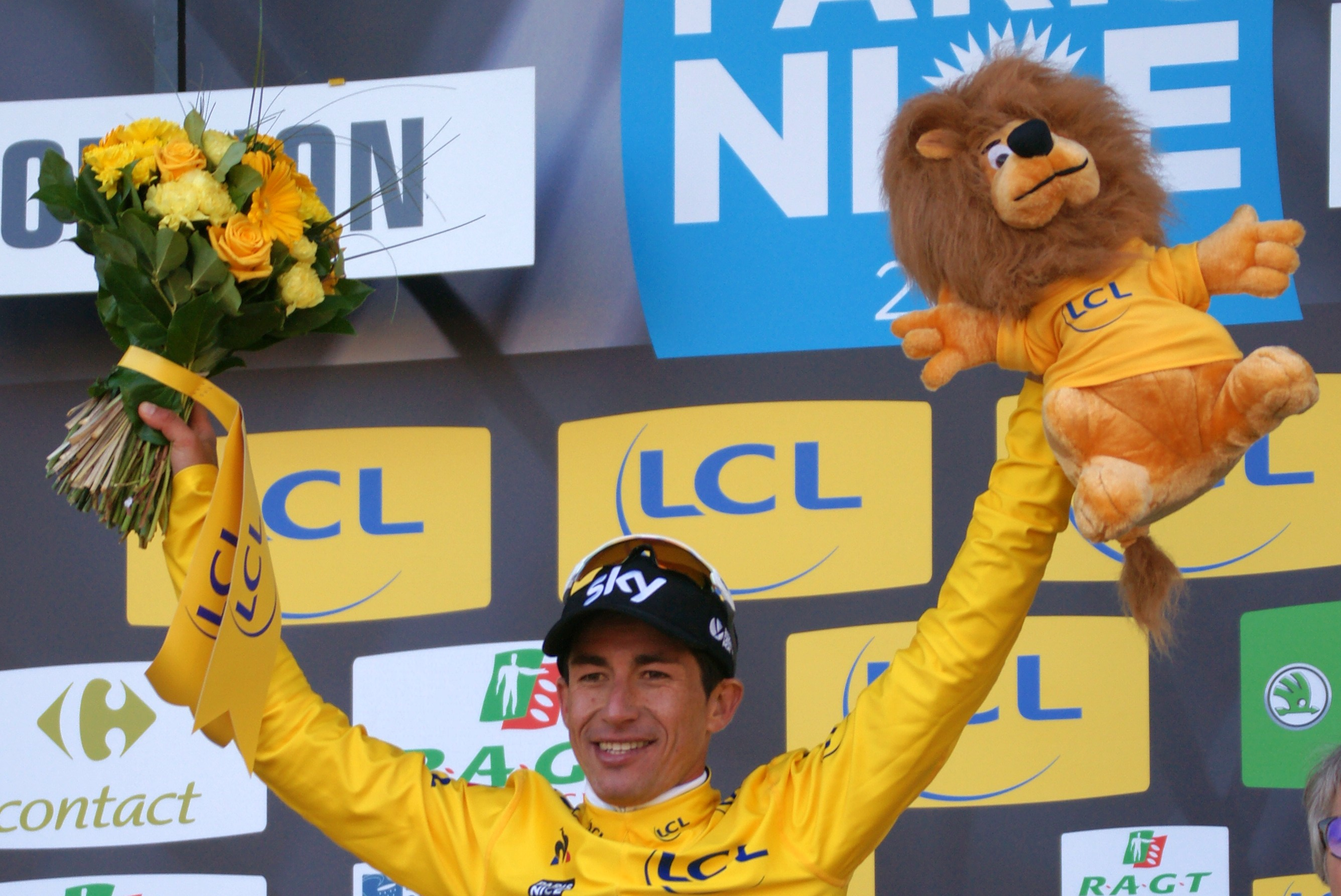
- Sergio Henao, who won the race by 2 seconds.

Race details
- Dates: 5–12 March 2017
- Stages: 8
- Distance: 1,233.5 km (766.5 mi)
- Winning time: 29h 50' 29"

Results
Jersey awarded to the overall winner	Winner	Sergio Henao (COL)	(Team Sky)
	Second	Alberto Contador (ESP)	(Trek–Segafredo)
	Third	Dan Martin (IRL)	(Quick-Step Floors)
Jersey awarded to the points classification winner	Points	Julian Alaphilippe (FRA)	(Quick-Step Floors)
Jersey awarded to the mountains classification winner	Mountains	Lilian Calmejane (FRA)	(Direct Énergie)
Jersey awarded to the young rider classification winner	Young rider	Julian Alaphilippe (FRA)	(Quick-Step Floors)
	Team	Quick-Step Floors	

The 2017 Paris–Nice was a road cycling stage race that took place between 5 and 12 March. It was the 75th edition of the Paris–Nice and was the sixth event of the 2017 UCI World Tour.

Team Sky won the race for the fifth time in six years, with Sergio Henao managing to fend off a final-day attack from Trek–Segafredo's Alberto Contador to win the race by just two seconds. Contador had trailed by 31 seconds overnight, but had gone clear with Quick-Step Floors rider David de la Cruz and Marc Soler of the Movistar Team; after taking a couple of seconds at an intermediate sprint, Contador was beaten to the line in Nice by de la Cruz, which cost him four bonus seconds and decided the race in favour of Henao. The podium was completed by de la Cruz's teammate Dan Martin, 30 seconds in arrears of Henao.

Quick-Step Floors were able to win the teams classification, with Julian Alaphilippe also finishing in the top-five overall, having held the race lead for three days during the week. Alaphilippe was the winner of the young rider classification, while four top-five stage finishes including a win in the individual time trial was also enough for him to clinch the points classification. The other jersey on offer was claimed by Direct Énergie for the second year in succession, as Lilian Calmejane won the mountains classification.

== Teams ==
As Paris–Nice was a UCI World Tour event, all eighteen UCI WorldTeams were invited automatically and obliged to enter a team in the race. Four UCI Professional Continental teams competed, completing the 22-team peloton.

Just as they did in the 2016 edition of the race, Lotto–Soudal chose to compete under a different name from the rest of the season: they became Lotto Fix ALL, taking the name of a product made by Soudal, their normal sponsor. They also wore blue and white jerseys in place of their normal red and white.

UCI WorldTeams

- AG2R La Mondiale
- Astana
- Bahrain–Merida
- BMC Racing Team
- Bora–Hansgrohe
- Cannondale–Drapac
- Team Dimension Data
- FDJ
- Team Katusha–Alpecin
- LottoNL–Jumbo
- Movistar Team
- Orica–Scott
- Quick-Step Floors
- Team Sky
- Team Sunweb
- Trek–Segafredo
- UAE Team Emirates
- Lotto Fix ALL

UCI Professional Continental teams

- Cofidis
- Delko–Marseille Provence KTM
- Direct Énergie
- Fortuneo–Vital Concept

== Route ==
The route of the 2017 Paris–Nice was announced on 3 January 2017. The race started with a road stage for the first time since 2014, with a circuit race around Bois-d'Arcy in the Yvelines department. A mountain-top time trial was also scheduled for the race, but unlike previous years, it was not held on the Col d'Èze. However, it was scheduled for Mont Brouilly, a 3 km (1.9 mi)-long climb with an average gradient of 7.7%, but reaching over 9% in the final kilometre. Mont Brouilly was due to feature as a stage finish in the 2016 Paris–Nice, but the stage was ultimately cancelled due to snow.

The penultimate stage was earmarked as the queen stage of the race, with two first-category climbs in the closing 40 kilometres (25 miles) of the stage – the Col Saint Martin and the stage finish at the Col de la Couillole; the finish was also the highest in the race's history, at 1,678 metres (5,505 feet) above sea level. Both mountains had previously featured during the fifteenth stage of the 1975 Tour de France, when Bernard Thévenet ultimately wrested what would have been a sixth yellow jersey away from Eddy Merckx, at the finish at Pra-Loup. The final stage finished along the seafront in Nice, but not on the Promenade des Anglais as customary, as a mark of respect to the victims of the Bastille Day terrorist attack in 2016. Instead, the race ended at the Quai des États-Unis.

Stage schedule
Stage	Date	Route	Distance	Type	Winner
1	5 March	Bois-d'Arcy to Bois-d'Arcy	148.5 km (92 mi)	Flat stage	Arnaud Démare (FRA)
2	6 March	Rochefort-en-Yvelines to Amilly	195 km (121 mi)	Flat stage	Sonny Colbrelli (ITA)
3	7 March	Chablis to Chalon-sur-Saône	190 km (118 mi)	Hilly stage	Sam Bennett (IRL)
4	8 March	Beaujeu to Mont Brouilly	14.5 km (9 mi)	Individual time trial	Julian Alaphilippe (FRA)
5	9 March	Quincié-en-Beaujolais to Bourg-de-Péage	199.5 km (124 mi)	Flat stage	André Greipel (GER)
6	10 March	Aubagne to Fayence	193.5 km (120 mi)	Medium-mountain stage	Simon Yates (GBR)
7	11 March	Nice to Col de la Couillole	177 km (110 mi)	Mountain stage	Richie Porte (AUS)
8	12 March	Nice to Nice	115.5 km (72 mi)	Medium-mountain stage	David de la Cruz (ESP)

== Stages ==
=== Stage 1 ===
5 March 2017 — Bois-d'Arcy to Bois-d'Arcy, 148.5 km (92 mi)

Result of Stage 1
Rank	Rider	Team	Time
1	Arnaud Démare (FRA)	FDJ	3h 22' 43"
2	Julian Alaphilippe (FRA)	Quick-Step Floors	+ 0"
3	Alexander Kristoff (NOR)	Team Katusha–Alpecin	+ 9"
4	Philippe Gilbert (BEL)	Quick-Step Floors	+ 9"
5	Romain Hardy (FRA)	Fortuneo–Vital Concept	+ 9"
6	Dan Martin (IRL)	Quick-Step Floors	+ 9"
7	Tony Gallopin (FRA)	Lotto–Soudal	+ 9"
8	Marco Haller (AUT)	Team Katusha–Alpecin	+ 9"
9	Sergio Henao (COL)	Team Sky	+ 9"
10	Rudy Molard (FRA)	FDJ	+ 9"

General classification after Stage 1
Rank	Rider	Team	Time
1	Arnaud Démare (FRA)	FDJ	3h 22' 33"
2	Julian Alaphilippe (FRA)	Quick-Step Floors	+ 4"
3	Alexander Kristoff (NOR)	Team Katusha–Alpecin	+ 15"
4	Philippe Gilbert (BEL)	Quick-Step Floors	+ 16"
5	Tony Gallopin (FRA)	Lotto–Soudal	+ 17"
6	Romain Hardy (FRA)	Fortuneo–Vital Concept	+ 18"
7	Dan Martin (IRL)	Quick-Step Floors	+ 19"
8	Marco Haller (AUT)	Team Katusha–Alpecin	+ 19"
9	Sergio Henao (COL)	Team Sky	+ 19"
10	Rudy Molard (FRA)	FDJ	+ 19"

=== Stage 2 ===
6 March 2017 — Rochefort-en-Yvelines to Amilly, 195 km (121 mi)

Result of Stage 2
Rank	Rider	Team	Time
1	Sonny Colbrelli (ITA)	Bahrain–Merida	4h 20' 59"
2	John Degenkolb (GER)	Trek–Segafredo	+ 0"
3	Arnaud Démare (FRA)	FDJ	+ 0"
4	Dylan Groenewegen (NED)	LottoNL–Jumbo	+ 0"
5	Christophe Laporte (FRA)	Cofidis	+ 0"
6	Matti Breschel (DEN)	Astana	+ 0"
7	Oliver Naesen (BEL)	AG2R La Mondiale	+ 0"
8	André Greipel (GER)	Lotto–Soudal	+ 0"
9	Alexander Kristoff (NOR)	Team Katusha–Alpecin	+ 0"
10	Evaldas Šiškevičius (LTU)	Delko–Marseille Provence KTM	+ 0"

General classification after Stage 2
Rank	Rider	Team	Time
1	Arnaud Démare (FRA)	FDJ	7h 43' 28"
2	Julian Alaphilippe (FRA)	Quick-Step Floors	+ 6"
3	Philippe Gilbert (BEL)	Quick-Step Floors	+ 17"
4	Alexander Kristoff (NOR)	Team Katusha–Alpecin	+ 19"
5	Tony Gallopin (FRA)	Lotto–Soudal	+ 19"
6	Romain Hardy (FRA)	Fortuneo–Vital Concept	+ 21"
7	Dan Martin (IRL)	Quick-Step Floors	+ 23"
8	Sergio Henao (COL)	Team Sky	+ 23"
9	Rudy Molard (FRA)	FDJ	+ 23"
10	Kristijan Koren (SLO)	Cannondale–Drapac	+ 31"

=== Stage 3 ===
7 March 2017 — Chablis to Chalon-sur-Saône, 190 km (118 mi)

Result of Stage 3
Rank	Rider	Team	Time
1	Sam Bennett (IRL)	Bora–Hansgrohe	4h 31' 14"
2	Alexander Kristoff (NOR)	Team Katusha–Alpecin	+ 0"
3	John Degenkolb (GER)	Trek–Segafredo	+ 0"
4	Marcel Kittel (GER)	Quick-Step Floors	+ 0"
5	Michael Matthews (AUS)	Team Sunweb	+ 0"
6	Arnaud Démare (FRA)	FDJ	+ 0"
7	André Greipel (GER)	Lotto–Soudal	+ 0"
8	Christophe Laporte (FRA)	Cofidis	+ 0"
9	Kristian Sbaragli (ITA)	Team Dimension Data	+ 0"
10	Magnus Cort (DEN)	Orica–Scott	+ 0"

General classification after Stage 3
Rank	Rider	Team	Time
1	Arnaud Démare (FRA)	FDJ	12h 14' 42"
2	Julian Alaphilippe (FRA)	Quick-Step Floors	+ 6"
3	Alexander Kristoff (NOR)	Team Katusha–Alpecin	+ 13"
4	Philippe Gilbert (BEL)	Quick-Step Floors	+ 17"
5	Tony Gallopin (FRA)	Lotto–Soudal	+ 19"
6	Romain Hardy (FRA)	Fortuneo–Vital Concept	+ 21"
7	Sergio Henao (COL)	Team Sky	+ 23"
8	Rudy Molard (FRA)	FDJ	+ 23"
9	Dan Martin (IRL)	Quick-Step Floors	+ 23"
10	Kristijan Koren (SLO)	Cannondale–Drapac	+ 31"

=== Stage 4 ===
8 March 2017 — Beaujeu to Mont Brouilly, 14.5 km (9 mi), individual time trial (ITT)

Result of Stage 4
Rank	Rider	Team	Time
1	Julian Alaphilippe (FRA)	Quick-Step Floors	21' 39"
2	Alberto Contador (ESP)	Trek–Segafredo	+ 19"
3	Tony Gallopin (FRA)	Lotto–Soudal	+ 20"
4	Gorka Izagirre (ESP)	Movistar Team	+ 20"
5	Ilnur Zakarin (RUS)	Team Katusha–Alpecin	+ 33"
6	David de la Cruz (ESP)	Quick-Step Floors	+ 45"
7	Michael Matthews (AUS)	Team Sunweb	+ 47"
8	Sergio Henao (COL)	Team Sky	+ 48"
9	Ion Izagirre (ESP)	Bahrain–Merida	+ 49"
10	Richie Porte (AUS)	BMC Racing Team	+ 50"

General classification after Stage 4
Rank	Rider	Team	Time
1	Julian Alaphilippe (FRA)	Quick-Step Floors	12h 36' 27"
2	Tony Gallopin (FRA)	Lotto–Soudal	+ 33"
3	Gorka Izagirre (ESP)	Movistar Team	+ 47"
4	Sergio Henao (COL)	Team Sky	+ 1' 05"
5	Dan Martin (IRL)	Quick-Step Floors	+ 1' 20"
6	Philippe Gilbert (BEL)	Quick-Step Floors	+ 1' 24"
7	Ilnur Zakarin (RUS)	Team Katusha–Alpecin	+ 1' 28"
8	Alberto Contador (ESP)	Trek–Segafredo	+ 1' 31"
9	Rudy Molard (FRA)	FDJ	+ 1' 32"
10	Arnaud Démare (FRA)	FDJ	+ 1' 35"

=== Stage 5 ===
9 March 2017 — Quincié-en-Beaujolais to Bourg-de-Péage, 199.5 km (124 mi)

Result of Stage 5
Rank	Rider	Team	Time
1	André Greipel (GER)	Lotto–Soudal	4h 43' 35"
2	Arnaud Démare (FRA)	FDJ	+ 0"
3	Dylan Groenewegen (NED)	LottoNL–Jumbo	+ 0"
4	Michael Matthews (AUS)	Team Sunweb	+ 0"
5	John Degenkolb (GER)	Trek–Segafredo	+ 0"
6	Magnus Cort (DEN)	Orica–Scott	+ 0"
7	Marcel Kittel (GER)	Quick-Step Floors	+ 0"
8	Bryan Coquard (FRA)	Direct Énergie	+ 0"
9	Sonny Colbrelli (ITA)	Bahrain–Merida	+ 0"
10	Sam Bennett (IRL)	Bora–Hansgrohe	+ 0"

General classification after Stage 5
Rank	Rider	Team	Time
1	Julian Alaphilippe (FRA)	Quick-Step Floors	17h 20' 02"
2	Tony Gallopin (FRA)	Lotto–Soudal	+ 33"
3	Gorka Izagirre (ESP)	Movistar Team	+ 47"
4	Sergio Henao (COL)	Team Sky	+ 1' 05"
5	Dan Martin (IRL)	Quick-Step Floors	+ 1' 20"
6	Philippe Gilbert (BEL)	Quick-Step Floors	+ 1' 24"
7	Ilnur Zakarin (RUS)	Team Katusha–Alpecin	+ 1' 28"
8	Arnaud Démare (FRA)	FDJ	+ 1' 29"
9	Alberto Contador (ESP)	Trek–Segafredo	+ 1' 31"
10	Rudy Molard (FRA)	FDJ	+ 1' 32"

=== Stage 6 ===
10 March 2017 — Aubagne to Fayence, 193.5 km (120 mi)

Result of Stage 6
Rank	Rider	Team	Time
1	Simon Yates (GBR)	Orica–Scott	4h 37' 51"
2	Sergio Henao (COL)	Team Sky	+ 17"
3	Richie Porte (AUS)	BMC Racing Team	+ 26"
4	Julian Alaphilippe (FRA)	Quick-Step Floors	+ 29"
5	Dan Martin (IRL)	Quick-Step Floors	+ 29"
6	Ion Izagirre (ESP)	Bahrain–Merida	+ 32"
7	Jakob Fuglsang (DEN)	Astana	+ 32"
8	Alberto Contador (ESP)	Trek–Segafredo	+ 32"
9	Ilnur Zakarin (RUS)	Team Katusha–Alpecin	+ 32"
10	Tony Gallopin (FRA)	Lotto–Soudal	+ 32"

General classification after Stage 6
Rank	Rider	Team	Time
1	Julian Alaphilippe (FRA)	Quick-Step Floors	21h 58' 22"
2	Tony Gallopin (FRA)	Lotto–Soudal	+ 36"
3	Sergio Henao (COL)	Team Sky	+ 46"
4	Gorka Izagirre (ESP)	Movistar Team	+ 57"
5	Dan Martin (IRL)	Quick-Step Floors	+ 1' 20"
6	Ilnur Zakarin (RUS)	Team Katusha–Alpecin	+ 1' 31"
7	Alberto Contador (ESP)	Trek–Segafredo	+ 1' 34"
8	Simon Yates (GBR)	Orica–Scott	+ 1' 37"
9	Ion Izagirre (ESP)	Bahrain–Merida	+ 2' 04"
10	Warren Barguil (FRA)	Team Sunweb	+ 3 '08"

=== Stage 7 ===
11 March 2017 — Nice to Col de la Couillole, 177 km (110 mi)

Result of Stage 7
Rank	Rider	Team	Time
1	Richie Porte (AUS)	BMC Racing Team	5h 01' 35"
2	Alberto Contador (ESP)	Trek–Segafredo	+ 21"
3	Dan Martin (IRL)	Quick-Step Floors	+ 32"
4	Sergio Henao (COL)	Team Sky	+ 32"
5	Ion Izagirre (ESP)	Bahrain–Merida	+ 55"
6	Jakob Fuglsang (DEN)	Astana	+ 1' 07"
7	Pierre Latour (FRA)	AG2R La Mondiale	+ 1' 11"
8	Ilnur Zakarin (RUS)	Team Katusha–Alpecin	+ 1' 21"
9	Marc Soler (ESP)	Movistar Team	+ 1' 21"
10	Gorka Izagirre (ESP)	Movistar Team	+ 1' 21"

General classification after Stage 7
Rank	Rider	Team	Time
1	Sergio Henao (COL)	Team Sky	27h 01' 15"
2	Dan Martin (IRL)	Quick-Step Floors	+ 30"
3	Alberto Contador (ESP)	Trek–Segafredo	+ 31"
4	Gorka Izagirre (ESP)	Movistar Team	+ 1' 00"
5	Julian Alaphilippe (FRA)	Quick-Step Floors	+ 1' 22"
6	Ilnur Zakarin (RUS)	Team Katusha–Alpecin	+ 1' 34"
7	Ion Izagirre (ESP)	Bahrain–Merida	+ 1' 41"
8	Tony Gallopin (FRA)	Lotto–Soudal	+ 3' 22"
9	Warren Barguil (FRA)	Team Sunweb	+ 4' 07"
10	Simon Yates (GBR)	Orica–Scott	+ 4' 39"

=== Stage 8 ===
12 March 2017 — Nice to Nice, 115.5 km (72 mi)

Result of Stage 8
Rank	Rider	Team	Time
1	David de la Cruz (ESP)	Quick-Step Floors	2h 48' 53"
2	Alberto Contador (ESP)	Trek–Segafredo	+ 0"
3	Marc Soler (ESP)	Movistar Team	+ 5"
4	Sonny Colbrelli (ITA)	Bahrain–Merida	+ 21"
5	Julian Alaphilippe (FRA)	Quick-Step Floors	+ 21"
6	Michael Matthews (AUS)	Team Sunweb	+ 21"
7	Diego Ulissi (ITA)	UAE Team Emirates	+ 21"
8	Gorka Izagirre (ESP)	Movistar Team	+ 21"
9	Arnold Jeannesson (FRA)	Fortuneo–Vital Concept	+ 21"
10	Lilian Calmejane (FRA)	Direct Énergie	+ 21"

Final general classification
Rank	Rider	Team	Time
1	Sergio Henao (COL)	Team Sky	29h 50' 29"
2	Alberto Contador (ESP)	Trek–Segafredo	+ 2"
3	Dan Martin (IRL)	Quick-Step Floors	+ 30"
4	Gorka Izagirre (ESP)	Movistar Team	+ 1' 00"
5	Julian Alaphilippe (FRA)	Quick-Step Floors	+ 1' 22"
6	Ilnur Zakarin (RUS)	Team Katusha–Alpecin	+ 1' 34"
7	Ion Izagirre (ESP)	Bahrain–Merida	+ 1' 41"
8	Warren Barguil (FRA)	Team Sunweb	+ 4' 07"
9	Simon Yates (GBR)	Orica–Scott	+ 4' 39"
10	Tony Gallopin (FRA)	Lotto–Soudal	+ 9' 14"

== Classification leadership table ==
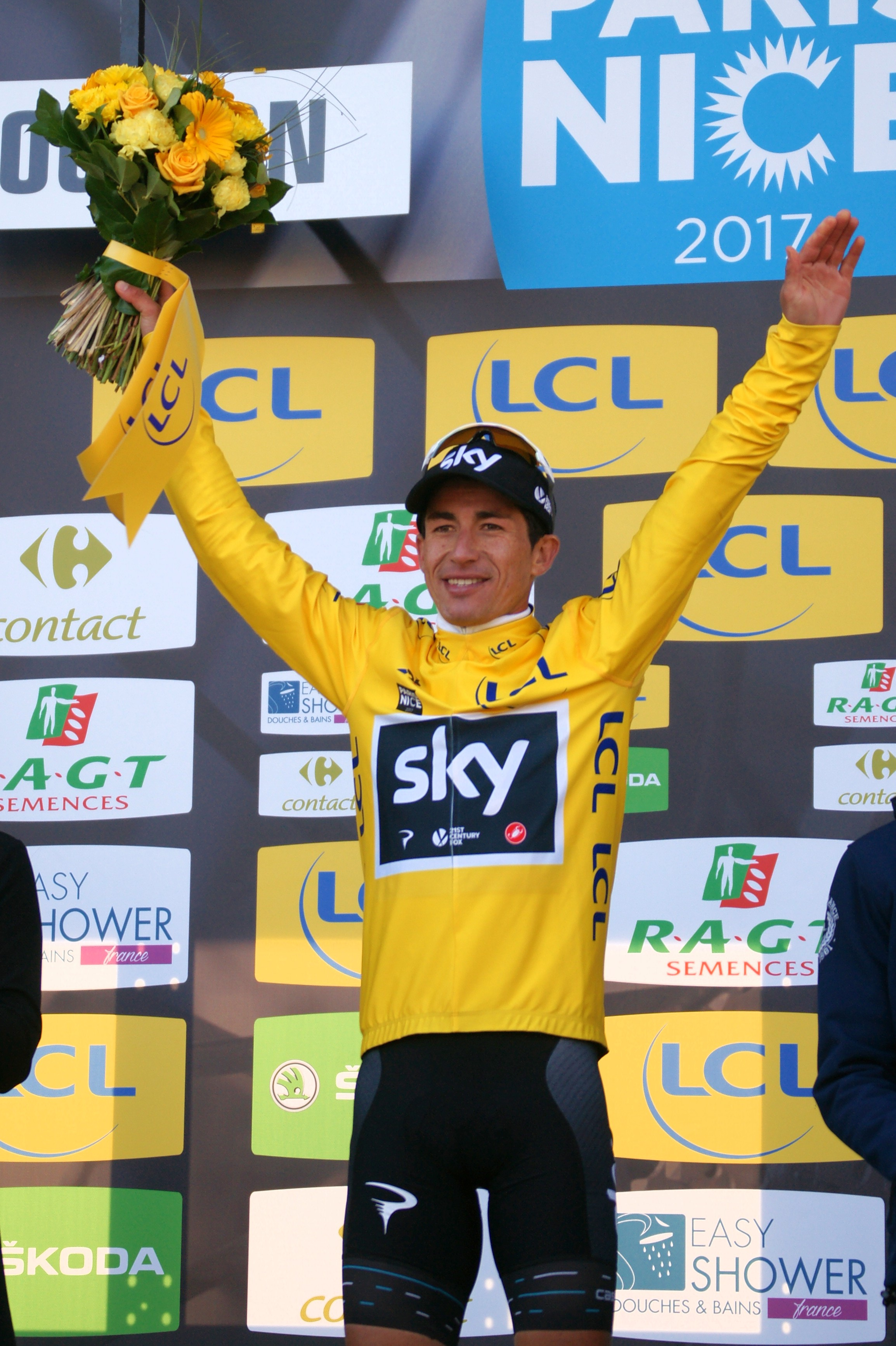
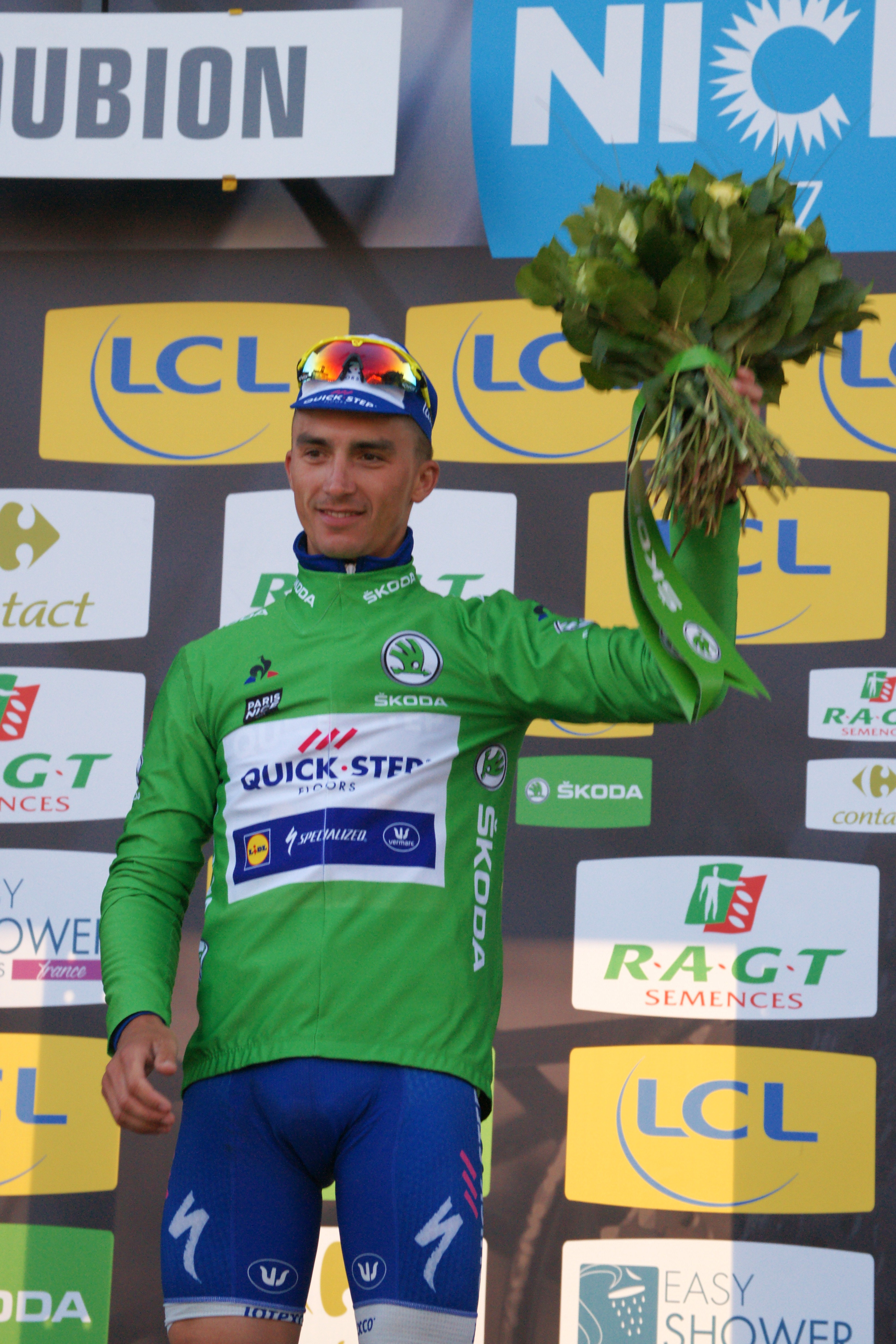
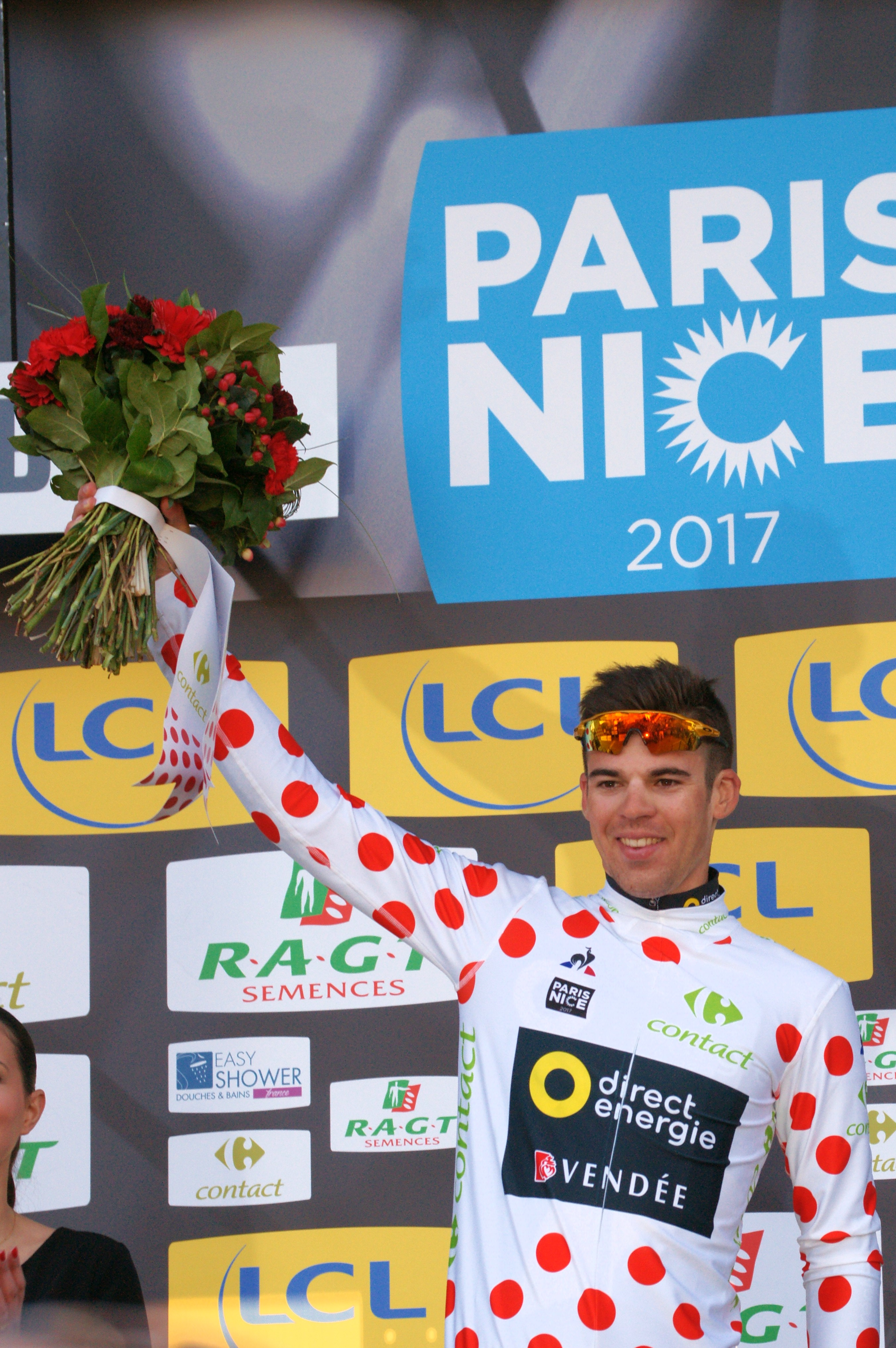
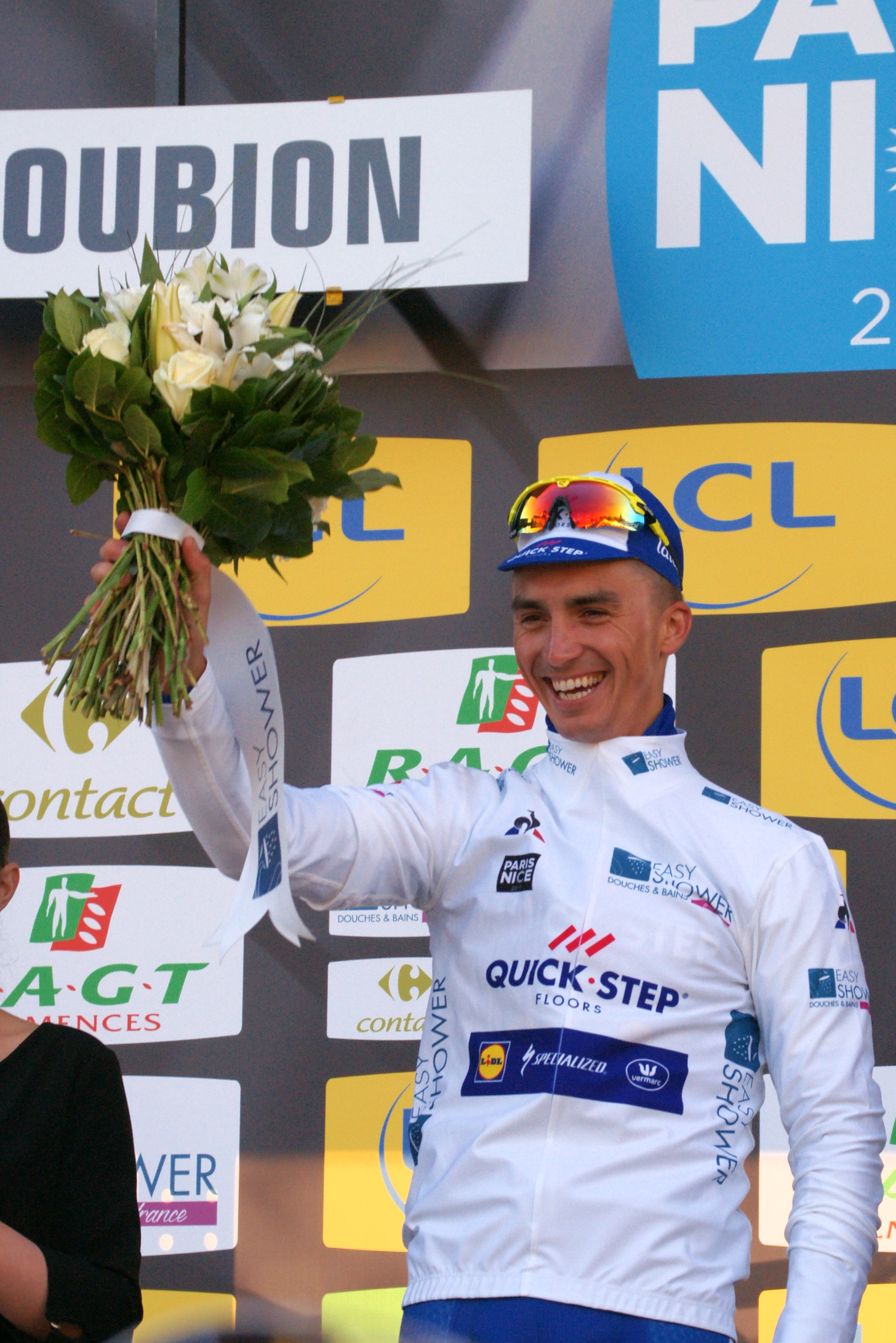
The jersey winners; clockwise from upper left: Sergio Henao (yellow), Julian Alaphilippe (green & white), Lilian Calmejane (polka-dot).

In the 2017 Paris–Nice, four jerseys were awarded. The general classification was calculated by adding each cyclist's finishing times on each stage. Time bonuses were awarded to the first three finishers on all stages except for the individual time trial: the stage winner won a ten-second bonus, with six and four seconds for the second and third riders respectively. Bonus seconds were also awarded to the first three riders at intermediate sprints – three seconds for the winner of the sprint, two seconds for the rider in second and one second for the rider in third. The leader of the general classification received a yellow jersey. This classification was considered the most important of the 2017 Paris–Nice, and the winner of the classification was considered the winner of the race.

Points for stage victory
Position	1	2	3	4	5	6	7	8	9	10
Points awarded	15	12	9	7	6	5	4	3	2	1

The second classification was the points classification. Riders were awarded points for finishing in the top ten in a stage. Unlike in the points classification in the Tour de France, the winners of all stages were awarded the same number of points. Points were also won in intermediate sprints; three points for crossing the sprint line first, two points for second place, and one for third. The leader of the points classification was awarded a green jersey.

Points for the mountains classification
Position	1	2	3	4	5	6	7
Points for Category 1	10	8	6	4	3	2	1
Points for Category 2	7	5	3	2	1	0	
Points for Category 3	4	2	1	0			

There was also a mountains classification, for which points were awarded for reaching the top of a climb before other riders. Each climb was categorised as either first, second, or third-category, with more points available for the more difficult, higher-categorised climbs. For first-category climbs, the top seven riders earned points; on second-category climbs, five riders won points; on third-category climbs, only the top three riders earned points. The leadership of the mountains classification was marked by a white jersey with red polka-dots.

The fourth jersey represented the young rider classification, marked by a white jersey, which was restored after not being awarded in 2016. Only riders born after 1 January 1992 were eligible; the young rider best placed in the general classification was the leader of the young rider classification. There was also a classification for teams, in which the times of the best three cyclists in a team on each stage were added together; the leading team at the end of the race was the team with the lowest cumulative time.

Stage	Winner	General classification	Points classification	Mountains classification	Young rider classification	Teams classification
1	Arnaud Démare	Arnaud Démare	Arnaud Démare (Note: In stage two, Alexander Kristoff, fourth in the points classification, wore the green jersey, because Arnaud Démare wore the yellow jersey as general classification leader and second-placed Julian Alaphilippe wore the white jersey as young rider classification leader. Third-placed Philippe Gilbert chose to retain his Belgian champion jersey instead of wearing the green jersey.) (Note: In stage three, Sonny Colbrelli, second in the points classification, wore the green jersey, because Arnaud Démare continued to wear the yellow jersey as general classification leader.) (Note: In stage four, John Degenkolb, second in the points classification, wore the green jersey, because Démare continued to wear the yellow jersey as general classification leader.)	Romain Hardy	Julian Alaphilippe (Note: In stages five through seven, Simon Yates, second in the young rider classification, wore the white jersey, because Julian Alaphilippe wore the yellow jersey as general classification leader.) (Note: In stage eight, Simon Yates continued to wear the white jersey, because Julian Alaphilippe wore the green jersey as points classification leader.)	Quick-Step Floors
2	Sonny Colbrelli	Arnaud Démare	Arnaud Démare	Romain Hardy	Julian Alaphilippe	Quick-Step Floors
3	Sam Bennett	Arnaud Démare	Arnaud Démare	Romain Hardy	Julian Alaphilippe	Quick-Step Floors
4	Julian Alaphilippe	Julian Alaphilippe	Julian Alaphilippe (Note: In stage five, Arnaud Démare, second in the points classification, wore the green jersey, because Julian Alaphilippe wore the yellow jersey as general classification leader.)	Romain Hardy	Julian Alaphilippe	Quick-Step Floors
5	André Greipel	Julian Alaphilippe	Arnaud Démare	Romain Hardy	Julian Alaphilippe	Quick-Step Floors
6	Simon Yates	Julian Alaphilippe	Arnaud Démare	Axel Domont	Julian Alaphilippe	Quick-Step Floors
7	Richie Porte	Sergio Henao	Julian Alaphilippe (Note: Julian Alaphilippe assumed the green jersey as points classification leader, after Arnaud Démare withdrew from the race during the stage.)	Lilian Calmejane	Julian Alaphilippe	Quick-Step Floors
8	David de la Cruz	Sergio Henao	Julian Alaphilippe	Lilian Calmejane	Julian Alaphilippe	Quick-Step Floors
Final		Sergio Henao	Julian Alaphilippe	Lilian Calmejane	Julian Alaphilippe	Quick-Step Floors
