= Simon Yates (cyclist) =

British road and track racing cyclist

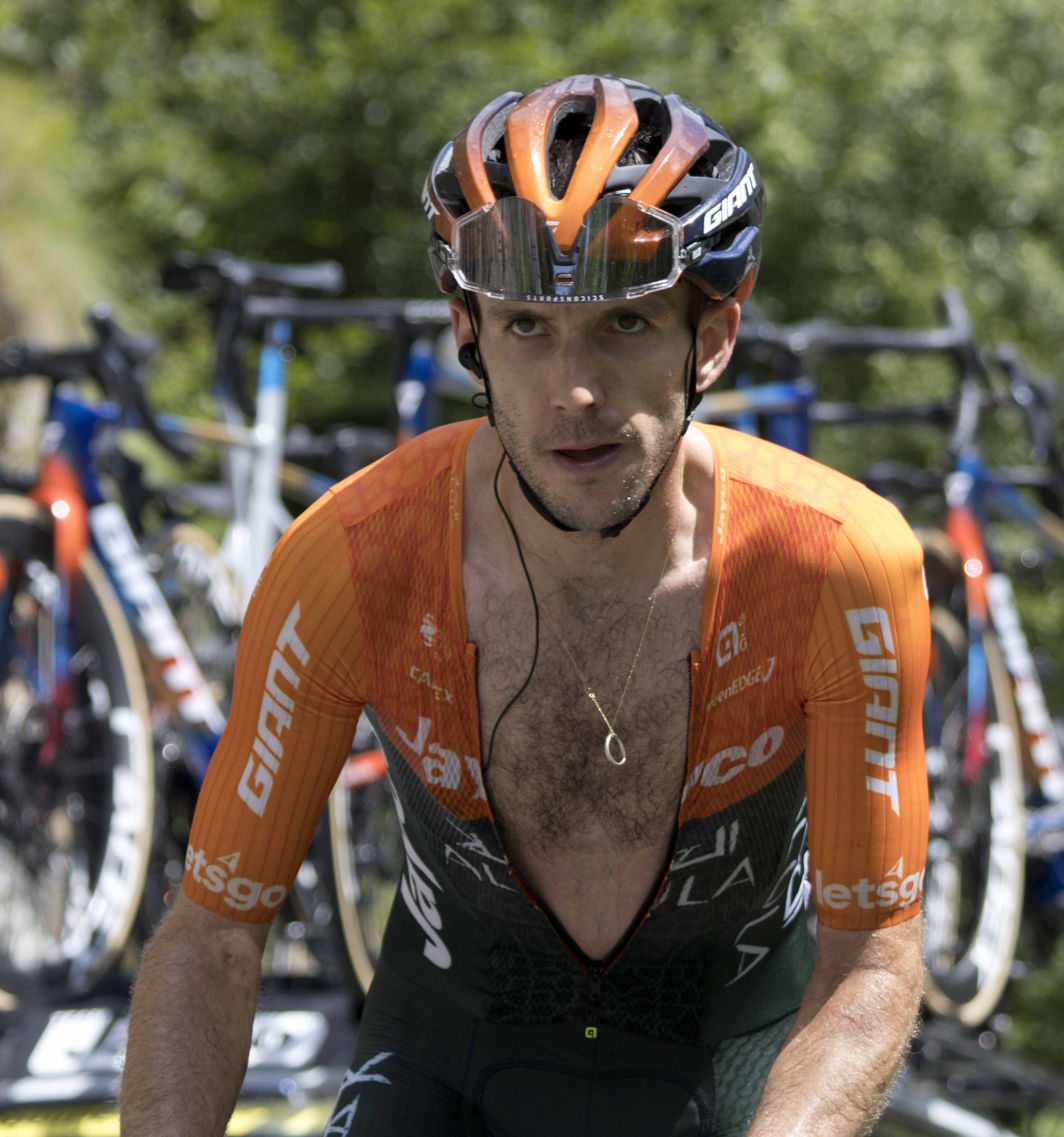
- Yates, Stage 15, Tour de France, 2024.

Personal information
- Full name: Simon Philip Yates
- Born: 7 August 1992 (age 34) Bury, Greater Manchester, England
- Height: 1.72 m (5 ft 7 1/2 in)
- Weight: 59 kg (130 lb; 9 st 4 lb)

Cycling career
- Sport: Cycling
- Current team: Visma–Lease a Bike
- Disciplines: Road; Track
- Role: Rider (retired)
- Rider type: Climber; All-rounder (road); Endurance (track)

Amateur team
- 2013: 100% me

Professional teams
- 2014–2024: Orica–GreenEDGE
- 2025–2026: Visma–Lease a Bike

Major wins
- Road Grand Tours Tour de France Young rider classification (2017) 3 individual stages (2019, 2025) Giro d'Italia General classification (2025) 6 individual stages (2018, 2021, 2022) Vuelta a España General classification (2018) Combination classification (2018) 2 individual stages (2016, 2018) Stage races Tirreno–Adriatico (2020) Tour of the Alps (2021) Other UCI World Tour (2018) Track World Championships Points race (2013)
Medal record
Men's track cycling
Representing Great Britain
World Championships
Gold medal – first place	2013 Minsk	Points race

Simon Philip Yates (born 7 August 1992) is a retired British professional road and track racing cyclist who last rode for UCI WorldTeam Visma–Lease a Bike. He won the gold medal in the points race at the 2013 Track Cycling World Championships. Following a doping ban in 2016, he won the young rider classification in the 2017 Tour de France and the general classification in the 2018 Vuelta a España and 2025 Giro d'Italia. Yates has taken more than thirty professional victories, including eleven Grand Tour stage victories – six at the Giro d'Italia, three at the Tour de France and two at the Vuelta a España. Yates has been a resident of Andorra since 2015.

His twin brother, Adam Yates, is also a professional cyclist.

== Early life ==
Yates grew up in Bury in Greater Manchester. He attended Derby High School and Bury College.

== Career ==
=== Early career ===
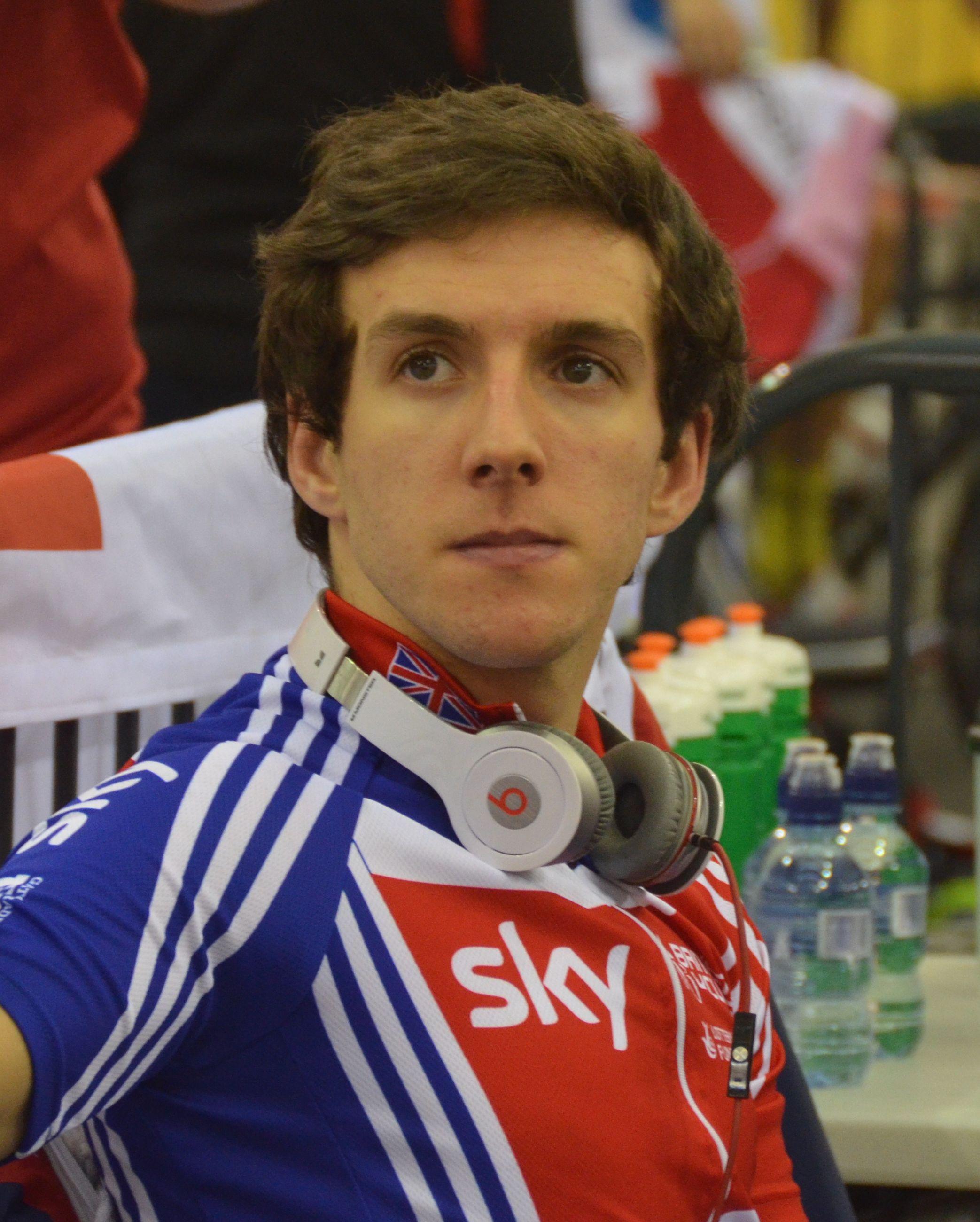
Yates in 2012

The brothers took up cycling after their father John was injured in a collision with a car while riding. During John's recovery he took the twins to Manchester Velodrome to track sessions run by his cycling club, Bury Clarion, to keep in touch with the other members. Both brothers soon started riding on the road for Bury Clarion and on the track for Eastlands Velo.

At the age of 18, Yates was selected by British Cycling for its Olympic Academy programme. He was also selected for the England team for the 2010 Commonwealth Games in Delhi, where his room-mate was Chris Froome.

He won the gold medal in the points race at the 2013 UCI Track Cycling World Championships.

Yates made his breakthrough on the road in 2013 riding for the British national team. Along with brother Adam, he competed at the 2013 Tour de l'Avenir for the Great Britain national team, where Simon won the race's fifth stage, ahead of Adam. Simon added another stage victory the following day, and finished the race tenth overall.

He was then selected as part of the British national team to take part in the Tour of Britain. He competed well throughout the race and on stage six he took his biggest win to that point, on the summit finish at Haytor, sprinting clear of a nine-man group, which included Bradley Wiggins and Nairo Quintana. Yates finished third overall in the race, and was the best rider in the under-23 classification.

=== Orica–GreenEDGE (2014–2024) ===
==== 2014 ====
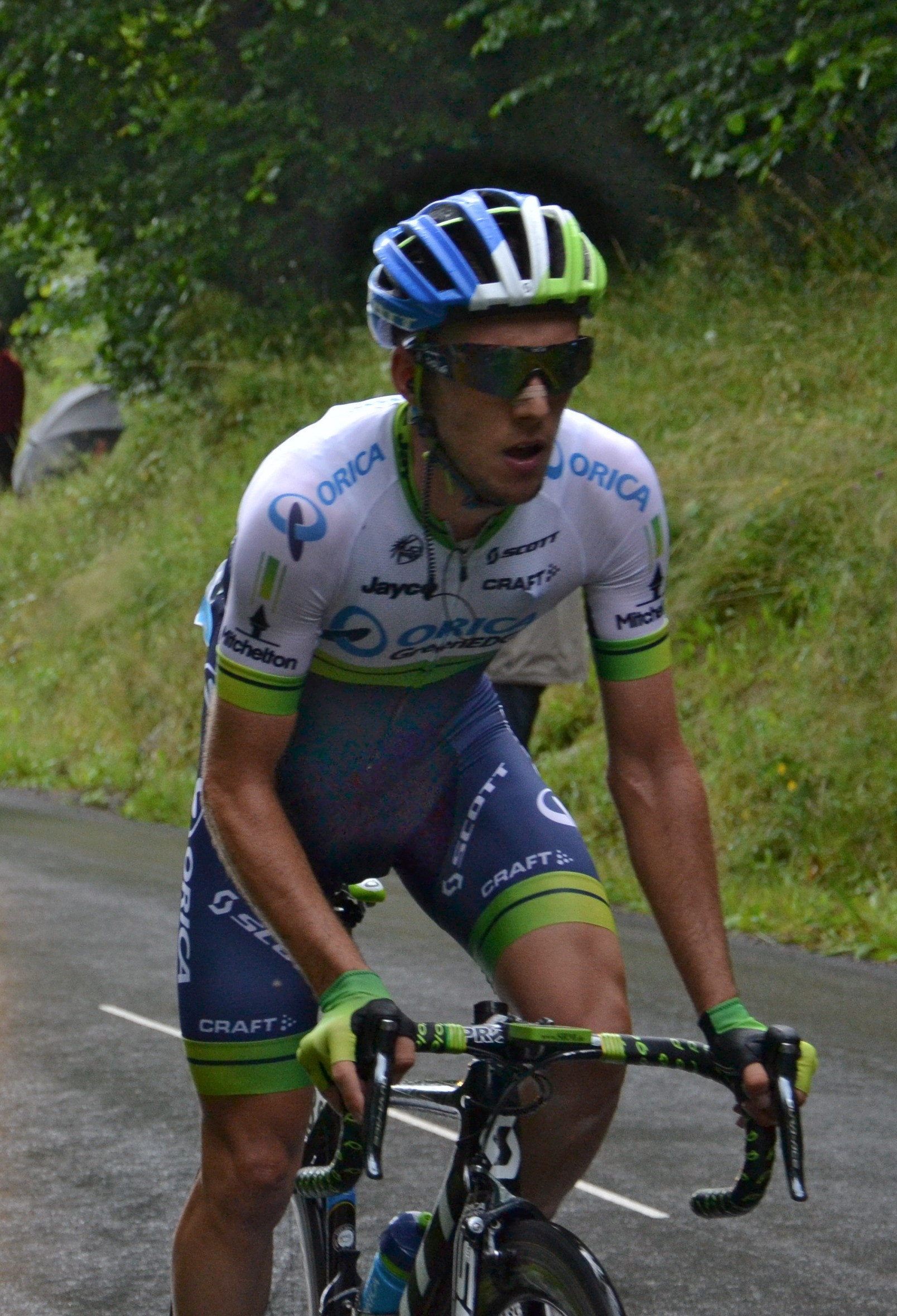
Yates at the 2014 Tour de France, his first Grand Tour.

Yates along with his brother joined the Australian UCI World Tour team Orica–GreenEDGE in 2014. He finished 12th overall in one of his first World Tour races, the Tour of the Basque Country. Yates suffered a broken collarbone on Stage 3 of the Tour of Turkey. He recovered to take seventh overall and the young rider classification in the Tour of Slovenia in June. He was a surprise selection for the Orica–GreenEDGE team for the 2014 Tour de France, with only 5 days' notice, and was one of only 4 British riders to take to the Grand Départ startline in Leeds. Yates featured in two breakaways during his Grand Tour debut, before being withdrawn by his team on the second rest day.

==== 2015 ====
In April 2015 Yates finished fifth overall in the Tour of the Basque Country. Later that month he rode the Tour de Romandie and placed sixth overall. In June, Yates finished fifth overall in the Critérium du Dauphiné after finishing second behind Chris Froome on the final stage, a summit finish at Modane. By doing so Yates also won the white jersey as best young rider.

He was again selected for the Tour de France, this time alongside his brother Adam. Simon placed eighth on Stage 3, which finished on the Mur de Huy, and eleventh on Stage 20, the queen stage of the race finishing on Alpe d'Huez.

==== 2016 ====
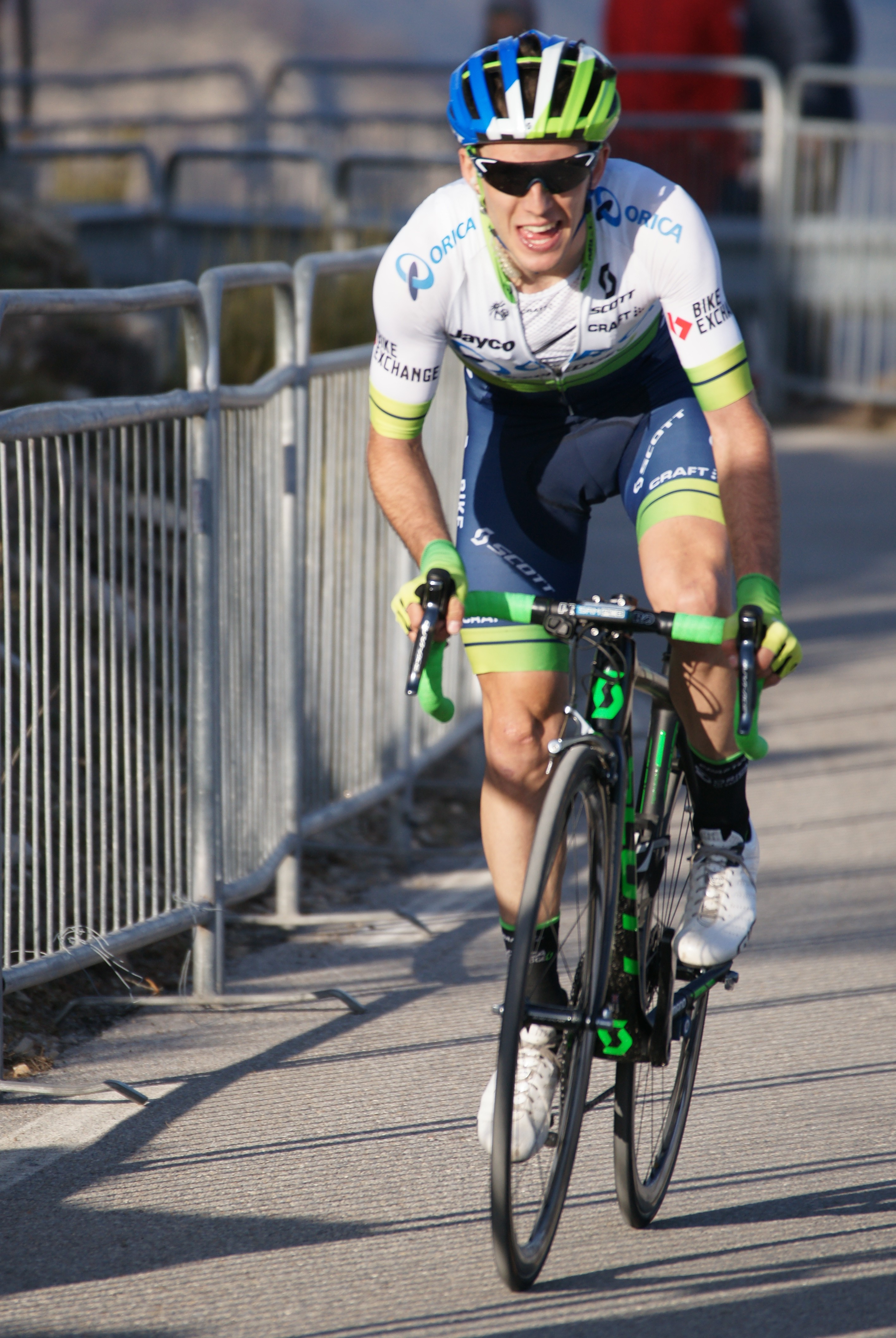
Yates at the 2016 Paris–Nice, where he initially finished seventh overall. His results from the race were expunged following a positive test for terbutaline.

In March, Yates finished seventh overall at Paris–Nice, however, in April it emerged that Yates had tested positive for the banned substance terbutaline in an in-competition test during the race. Yates was disqualified from the race and served a four-month doping ban during 2016; his team took full responsibility for this blaming an "administrative error". The ban meant Yates missed the Tour de France, where his brother Adam finished fourth overall and won the young rider classification.

Following the expiry of his doping suspension, he was named in the startlist for the Vuelta a España. In stage 6 Yates, seeing an opportunity, escaped from a breakaway group to win a solo stage victory – the first of the Yates brothers to take a Grand Tour stage victory.

==== 2017 ====
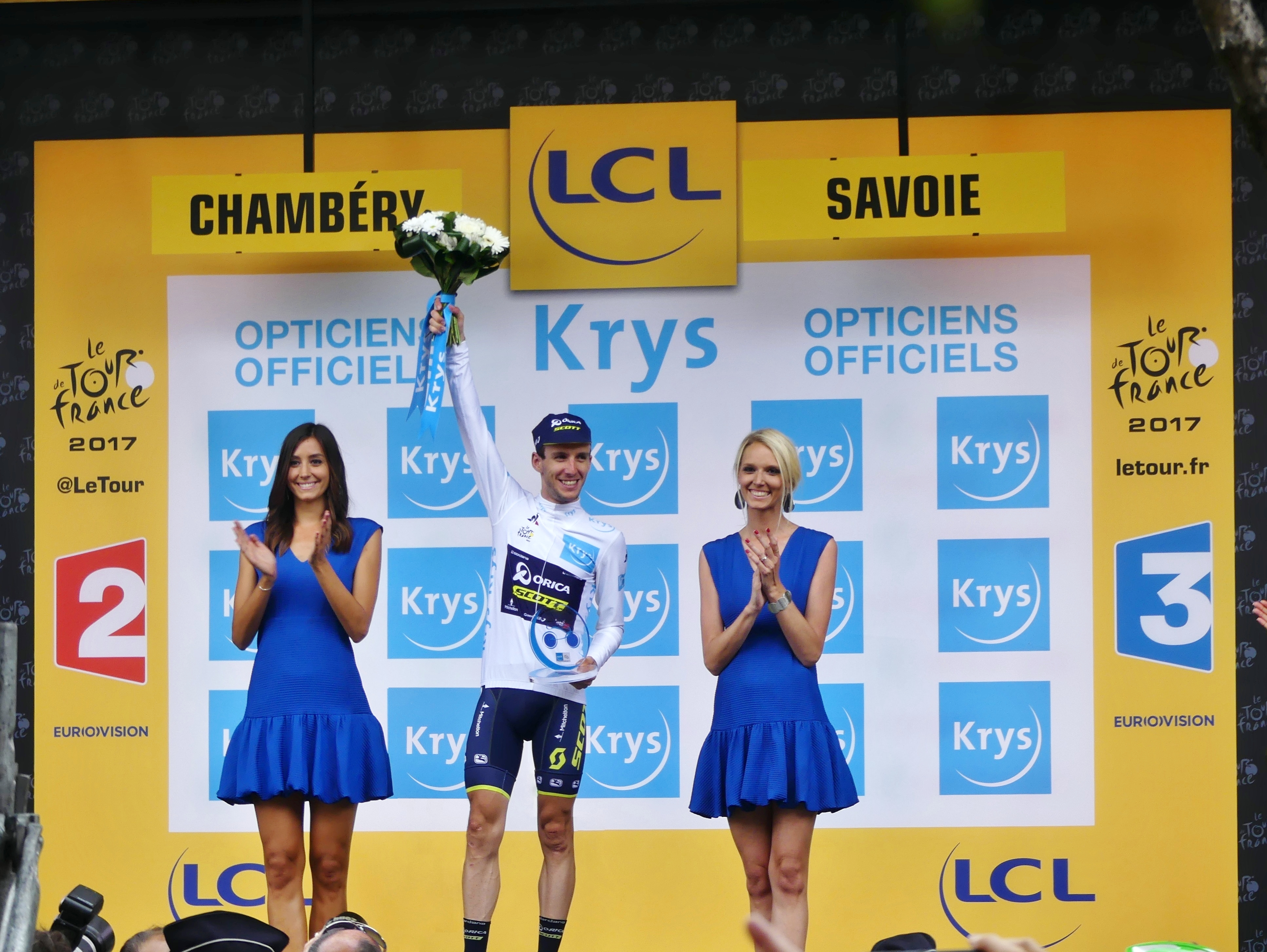
Yates, wearing the white jersey of young rider classification leader, at the 2017 Tour de France

2017 saw Yates collect stage wins at two prestigious stage races, Paris–Nice and the Tour de Romandie. He placed second at the latter, his highest finish in a UCI World Tour stage-race at the time. He finished 7th overall at the Tour de France and won the young rider classification, matching the feat achieved by his twin brother a year prior.

==== 2018: Grand Tour success ====
Yates confirmed his and the team's plans for him participating in the Giro d'Italia and the Vuelta a España. In March, Yates won Stage 7 of the Paris–Nice, a mountain top finish to Valdeblore La Colmiane, to take the overall race lead going into the final stage. However, Marc Soler of the Movistar Team, who started 37 seconds down on Yates in sixth place overall, attacked around halfway into the stage along with compatriot David de la Cruz (Team Sky); the duo joined Omar Fraile (Astana) at the head of the race, and the trio managed to stay clear of the rest of the field by the time they reached Nice. As de la Cruz and Fraile contested stage honours, Soler finished third – acquiring four bonus seconds on the finish in addition to three gained at an earlier intermediate sprint – and with a 35-second gap to Yates and the remaining general classification contenders, it was enough to give Soler victory over Yates by four seconds. Later that month, Yates won stage 7 of the Volta a Catalunya after attacking multiple times on the 6.6-kilometre (4.1-mile)-long final circuit through the Montjuïc Park; he finished fourth overall.

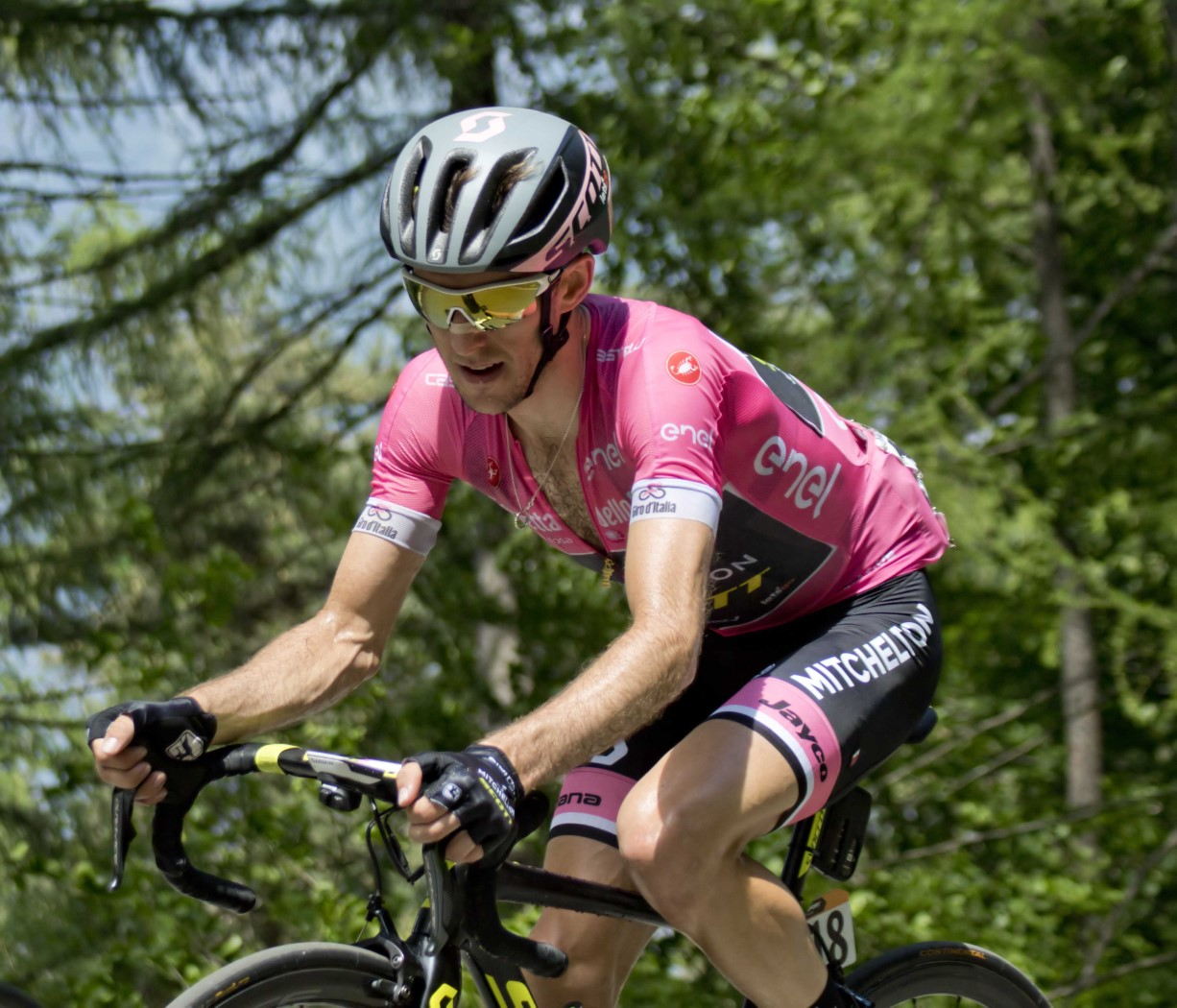
Yates wearing the Maglia rosa at the 2018 Giro d'Italia.

Yates entered the Giro d'Italia as joint leader of Mitchelton–Scott with Esteban Chaves, supported by a strong climbing focused team including Roman Kreuziger, Mikel Nieve and Jack Haig. Yates placed seventh in the opening 9.7-kilometre (6.0-mile) individual time trial in Jerusalem, 20 seconds down on defending race winner Tom Dumoulin (Team Sunweb). On Stage 6 to Mount Etna, Yates took the race lead after finishing second behind teammate Chaves; Yates attacked from the group of favourites 1.5 kilometres (0.93 miles) from the summit and caught Chaves, who had been part of the day's breakaway, in sight of the line, but allowed Chaves to take the stage honours. The result meant Yates held the Maglia rosa over Dumoulin in second, and Chaves in third place. Yates won stage 9 after accelerating away with 100 metres (330 feet) to go on the summit finish to Gran Sasso d'Italia, extending his lead over Chaves and Dumoulin. Yates extended his lead further on Stage 10, but teammate Chaves lost 25 minutes after being dropped on the first climb. Yates claimed his second stage victory on Stage 11, attacking with 1.5 kilometres (0.93 miles) to go and holding off the pursuit of Dumoulin to win on a hill top finish in Osimo, increasing his lead.

On Stage 14, Yates finished second behind Chris Froome (Team Sky) on Monte Zoncolan. With six bonus seconds for finishing second, Yates extended his overall advantage over Dumoulin, whilst his gap over Froome was 3 minutes, 10 seconds. Yates pedaled to a solo win on stage 15 to Sappada, attacking with 18 kilometres (11 miles) remaining, increasing his lead over Dumoulin. After holding his lead through the 34.2-kilometre (21.3-mile) individual time trial held as stage 17, Yates cracked on the final climb to Prato Nevoso on stage 18, losing 28 seconds to all of his other general classification rivals. Stage 19 had been classified as the 'queen stage' of the race, with three focussed climbs in the latter half of the stage: the half paved-half gravel climb of the Colle delle Finestre, followed by the climb to Sestriere and the final uphill finish to Bardonecchia. Yates cracked on the lower slopes of the Finestre, before Froome launched a solo attack with 80 kilometres (50 miles) left of the stage. Froome's advantage grew throughout the second half of the stage, culminating in him taking a stage victory of more than three minutes and thereby also taking the overall race lead, 40 seconds ahead of Dumoulin. Yates lost over 38 minutes to Froome and dropped to 17th overall. He eventually finished the race 21st overall, 1 hour and 15 minutes behind the winner Froome.

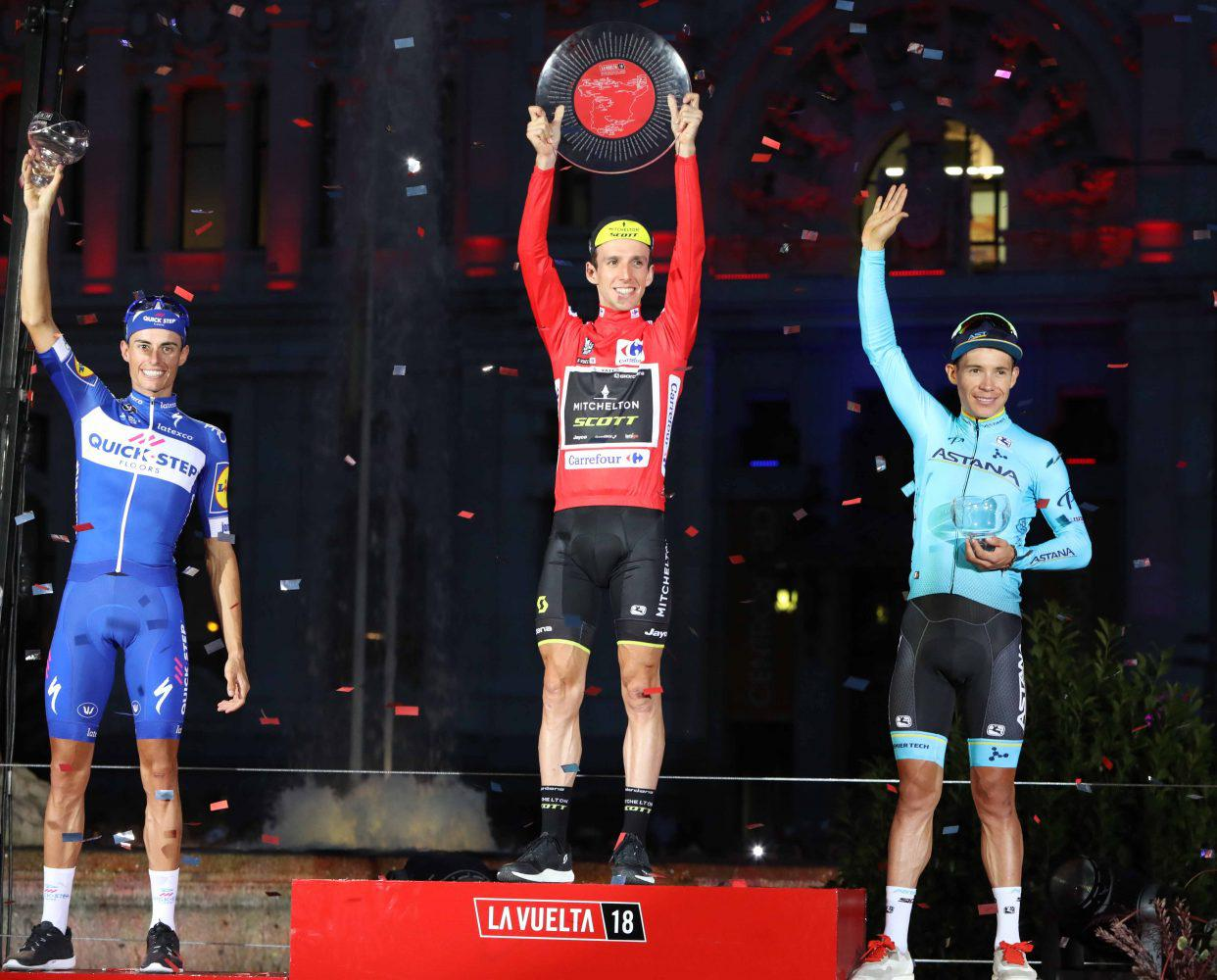
Yates (centre) on the podium at the 2018 Vuelta a España.

After the Giro, Yates made his return to racing at the Prueba Villafranca de Ordizia, where he finished second behind team-mate Robert Power. He subsequently returned to WorldTour competition at the Tour de Pologne in August, where he won the race's closing stage with a solo attack and finished second overall behind Michał Kwiatkowski. Yates was Mitchelton–Scott's team leader for the Vuelta a España, with support from his brother. Yates moved into third place on the general classification after stage 4, the first mountain stage, ten seconds behind leader Kwiatkowski. On the ninth stage, Yates took the leader's red jersey from Rudy Molard going into the first rest day. However he lost the lead on stage 12, when Mitchelton–Scott elected not to close down a large breakaway, with the red jersey being taken by Jesús Herrada with Yates in second and Alejandro Valverde in third. The following day, Yates cut nearly two minutes from Herrada's lead, and he then took victory on the fourteenth stage, reclaiming the overall lead. He extended his lead during stages 16 (an individual time trial) and 19, and on the last mountain stage, Yates attacked his rivals on the penultimate climb, joining Miguel Ángel López and Nairo Quintana alongside Enric Mas at the head of the race. He eventually finishing third on the stage behind Mas and López, who moved up into second and third overall after Valverde and Steven Kruijswijk lost significant time. He went on to safely cross the finish line in Madrid to secure his overall victory.

==== 2019 ====
Yates previously considered time-trialling to be a weakness, and slowly improved since his junior years. He had improved in 2019, with his first win in the discipline coming on a hilly course at Paris–Nice. Yates returned to the Giro d'Italia aiming for the general classification. He entered the race, publicly stating that he considered himself as "the number one favourite" for the race. He finished second on the opening individual time trial stage in Bologna, behind only Primož Roglič. However, he was unable to repeat this result in the second individual time trial, on stage nine, where he lost more than three minutes, dropping to 24th overall. He lost further time on stage 13 up to Serrù Lake, and despite a second-place finish on stage 19, he finished 8th overall and described it as "heartbreaking".

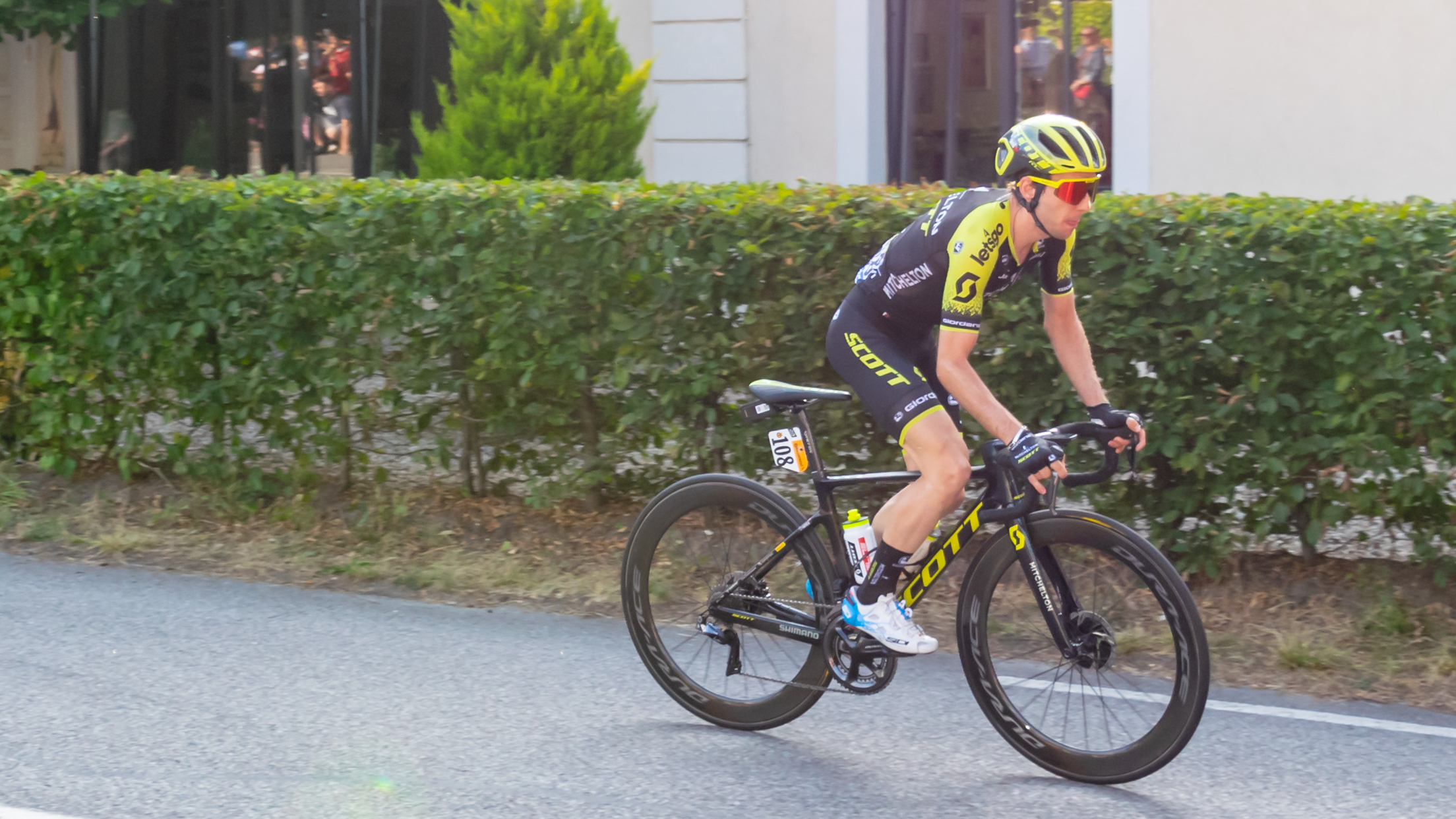
Yates at the 2019 Tour de France, where he won two stages.

He rode the Tour de France, in support of his brother's general classification ambition, but Simon was allowed a day off domestique duty, and won stage 12 into Bagnères-de-Bigorre in a 3 up sprint against Pello Bilbao and Gregor Mühlberger. Unfortunately for Adam, his general classification hopes faded after losing time on the individual time-trial and the climb to Col du Tourmalet. These general classification losses freed up Simon as the team refocused on stage wins, and he added another mountain stage win after a solo attack on stage 15, taking Mitchelton–Scott's tally to 3 before the second rest day.

==== 2020 ====
Yates started his season in Australia, and took top-ten finishes at the Tour Down Under (seventh) and the Cadel Evans Great Ocean Road Race (tenth), before racing was suspended due to the COVID-19 pandemic. Following the suspension, Yates extended his contract with Mitchelton–Scott until the end of the 2022 season, and he finished third at August's Tour de Pologne, before becoming the first British winner of Tirreno–Adriatico the following month – beating Geraint Thomas in a British 1–2. He had taken the race lead following a stage win on stage five. He rode the Giro d'Italia in October but had to abandon the race before the start of stage 8, after he tested positive for COVID-19.

==== 2021 ====
Yates started his season with top-ten overall finishes at Tirreno–Adriatico (tenth), and the Volta a Catalunya (ninth), before his first wins came at April's Tour of the Alps. He won the second stage in Austria, having attacked with 24 kilometres (15 miles) remaining, and soloed to victory by 41 seconds ahead of his next closest rival. Having assumed the leader's jersey, Yates maintained the lead to the end of the race, finishing almost a minute clear of Pello Bilbao for his third stage race victory. At the Giro d'Italia, Yates ran as high as second overall during the race, but ultimately finished in third place – having been the favourite for the race – more than four minutes down on winner Egan Bernal. Yates took his fourth stage victory at the race, when he won stage 19 atop the Alpe di Mera, following a 5-kilometre (3.1-mile) solo move. He failed to finish the Tour de France later in the year, but he did win the mountains classification at the CRO Race on his way to fourth overall.

==== 2022 ====
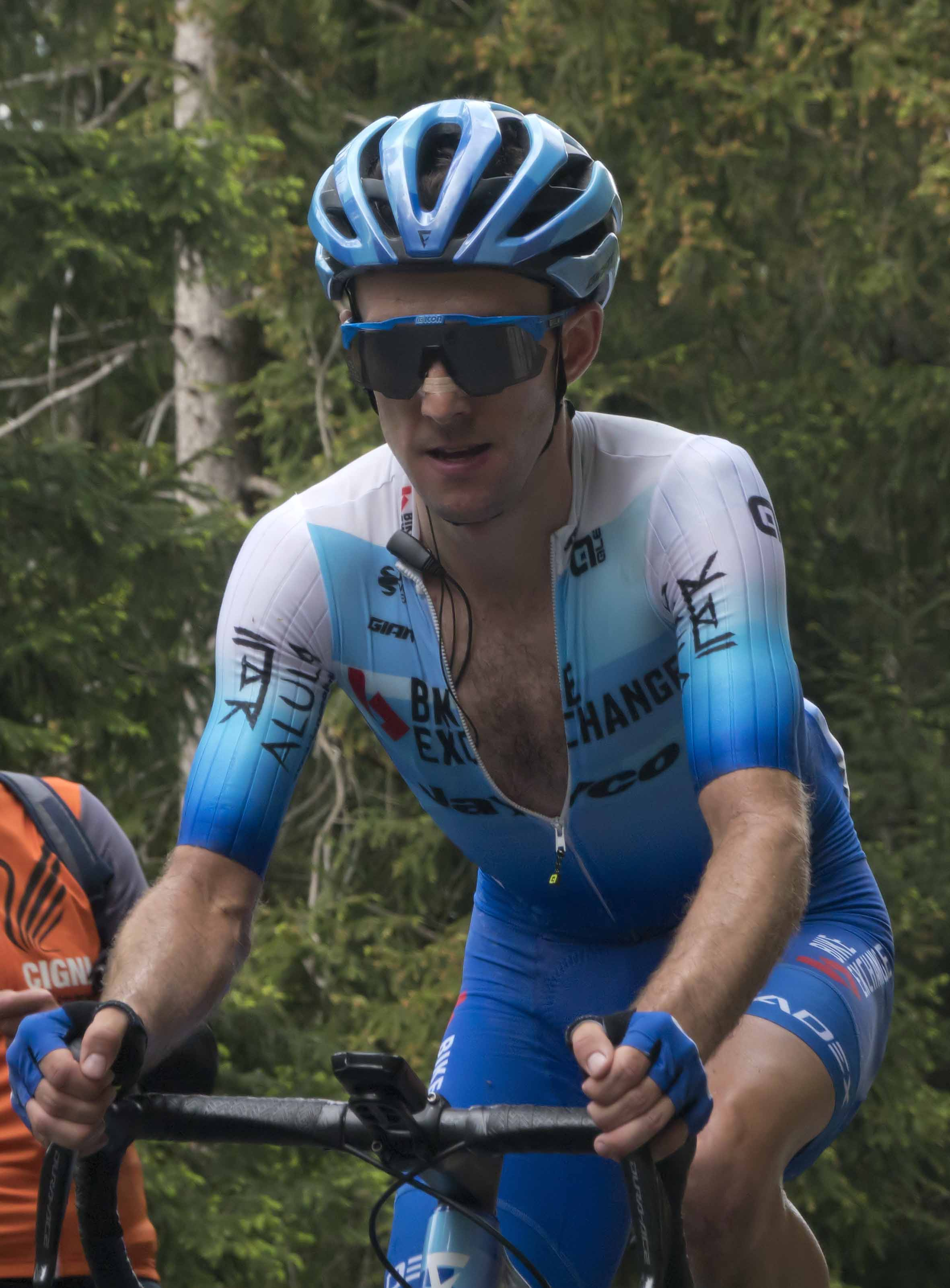
Yates at the 2022 Giro d'Italia, where he won two stages.

Yates made his first start of the year at February's Vuelta a Andalucía, where he finished fifth overall. The following month, Yates finished in second place at Paris–Nice for the second time in his career; he moved up to second overall following the fifth stage, and maintained this position for the remainder of the race, despite his attempts to overhaul Primož Roglič during his stage-winning attack on the final stage into Nice. He won two stages and the points classification at the Vuelta a Asturias the week before the Giro d'Italia started. At the Giro d'Italia, Yates won the second stage individual time trial in Budapest, moving up to second overall behind Mathieu van der Poel. He remained in the top-five placings until the ninth stage, losing more than eleven minutes on the final climb to Blockhaus. He added a second stage win on stage fourteen in Turin, but withdrew from the race in the final week.

In July, Yates extended his contract with Team BikeExchange–Jayco until the end of the 2024 season. He then started a Spanish block of racing with a victory in the Prueba Villafranca de Ordizia one-day race, having gone clear of the peloton with 11.5 kilometres (7.1 miles) remaining. A few days later, Yates won the Vuelta a Castilla y León stage race, having won the second and final stage from a 27-kilometre (17-mile) solo attack. He rode the Vuelta a España for the first time since his victory in 2018, but withdrew from the race while in fifth place overall, due to a positive test for COVID-19.

==== 2023 ====
With the Tour Down Under being held for the first time since 2020, Yates started his season in Australia, where he finished in second overall behind Jay Vine, and won the final stage in a two-up sprint with Vine atop Mount Lofty. He then recorded finishes of fourth at Paris–Nice and ninth at the Tour of the Basque Country, before withdrawing from the Tour de Romandie due to a stomach problem. He would not race again prior to the Tour de France – missing the Giro d'Italia, having competed in its previous five editions.

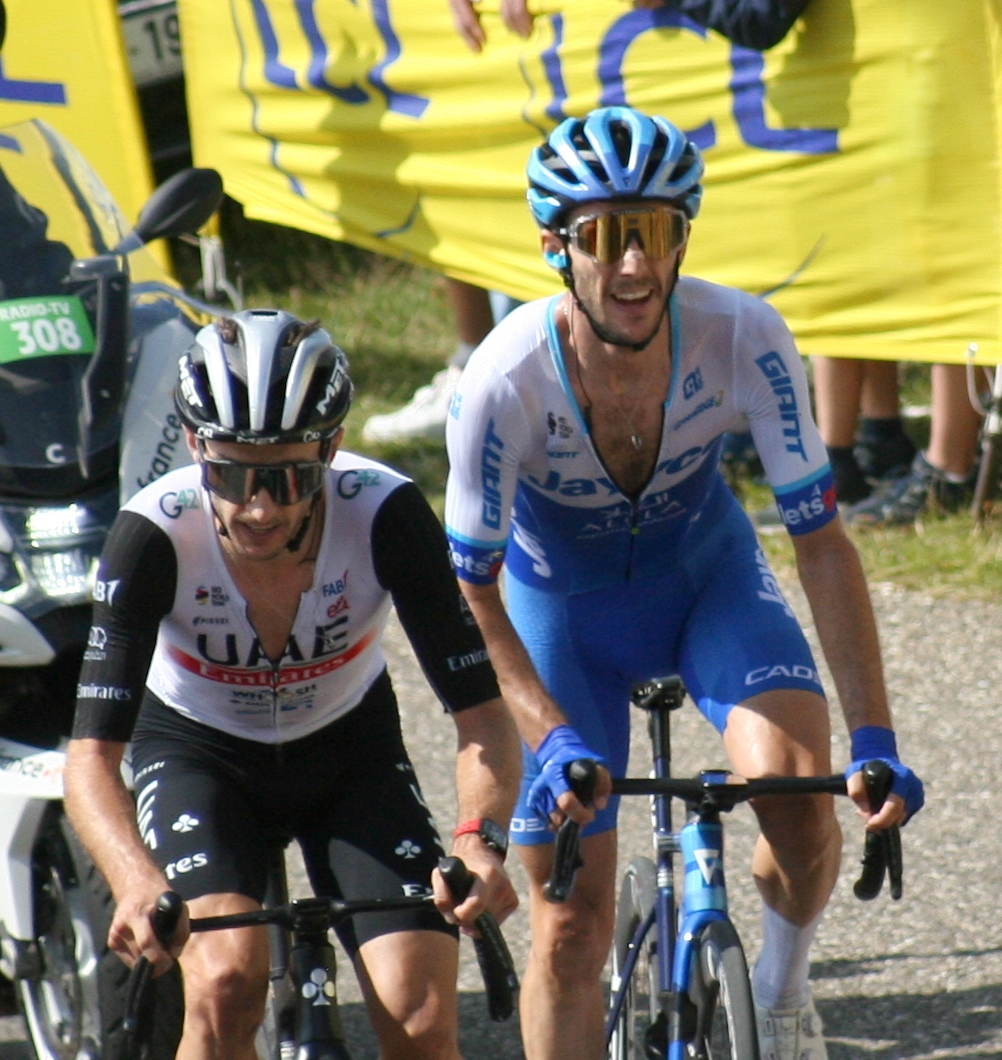
Simon (right) alongside his brother at the 2023 Tour de France, where he came 4th overall, his best finish to date.

The opening stage of the Tour de France, held in and around Bilbao, saw Adam Yates attack on the descent from the Pike Bidea climb, where he was followed by his brother – with them working together over the closing kilometres. Adam Yates pulled clear in the closing 350 metres (1,150 feet) to take the stage victory by four seconds, as they became the third set of brothers to finish 1–2 on a Tour de France stage, after the Pélissiers (Francis and Henri) and the Schlecks (Andy and Fränk). Yates remained in the top-ten placings in the general classification throughout the race, dropping no lower than eighth, but was unable to win a stage, adding a further second-place stage finish on stage seventeen – an Alpine stage with more than 5,000 metres (16,000 feet) of climbing that Yates described as "wicked". He ultimately finished the race in 4th overall, having overturned an 18-second deficit to Carlos Rodríguez before the penultimate stage into a 34-second advantage, missing out on the final podium spot by almost 90 seconds – to brother Adam.

In the autumn, he took four top-six race results at the Grand Prix Cycliste de Montréal (sixth), the Memorial Marco Pantani (fourth), the Giro dell'Emilia (third), and Il Lombardia (fifth), but no further victories.

==== 2025 ====
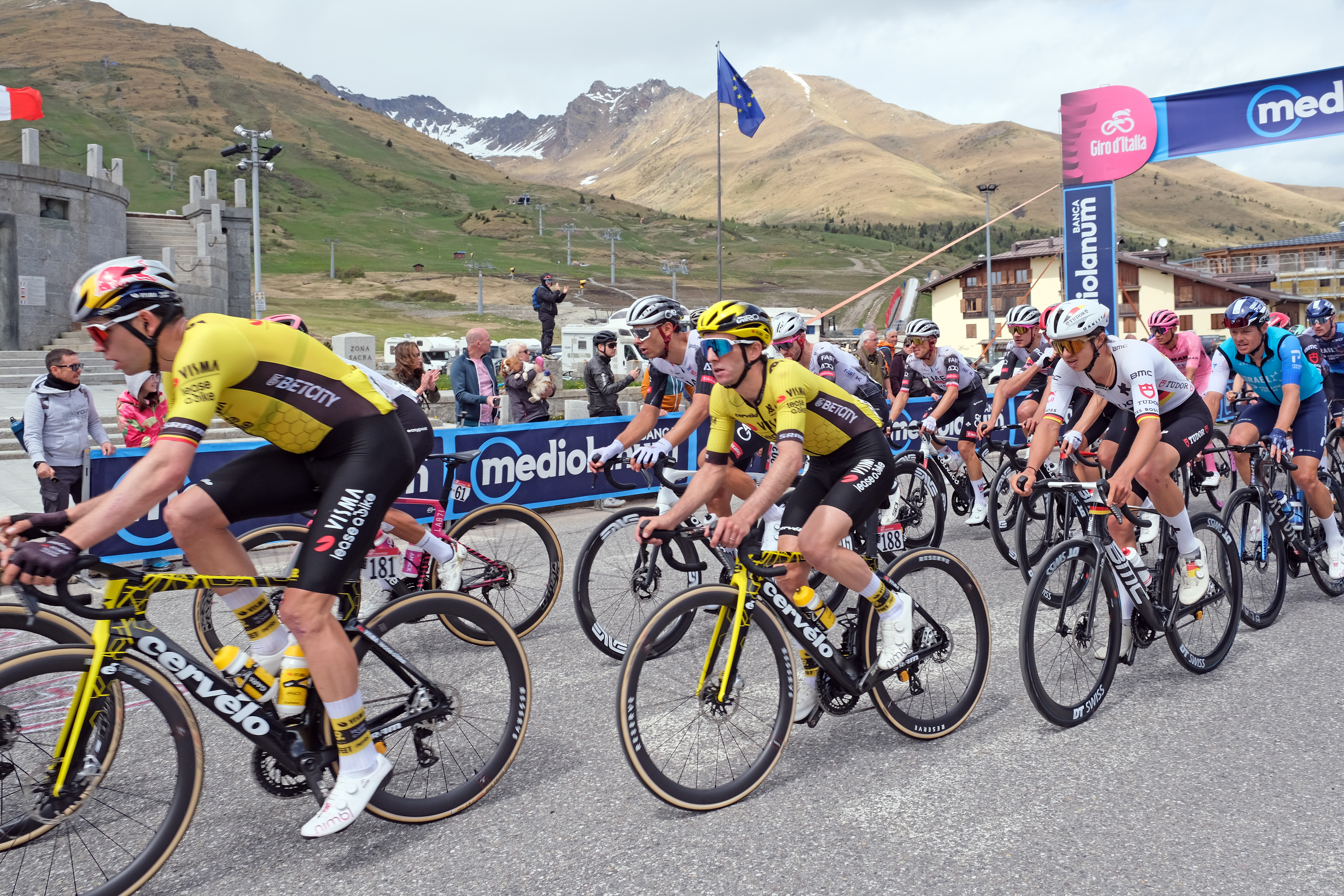
Yates on top of Tonale Pass on stage 17 of Giro d’Italia 2025

Yates joined Visma–Lease a Bike in 2025, signing a contract for two years.

On the penultimate stage of 2025 Giro d'Italia, third placed Yates grabbed the pink jersey by overturning a 1:21 minute deficit on UAE Team Emirates XRG's Isaac del Toro. Yates attacked 13 kilometres from the summit of the Colle delle Finestre and, helped by teammate and super-domestique Wout van Aert, he gained time on both del Toro and Richard Carapaz, placed first and second before the start respectively. In Rome, he clinched his second Grand Tour win by riding out the final day with his team-mate Olav Kooij winning the bunch sprint.

On 7 January 2026 Yates announced his immediate retirement.

== Doping ban ==
In April 2016 it emerged that Yates had tested positive for the banned substance terbutaline in an in-competition test during Paris–Nice the previous month, where he finished seventh overall. Orica–GreenEDGE's owner Gerry Ryan accused British Cycling of leaking the news of Yates's failed drug test to the press, and criticised the organisation for doing so. In a statement, Orica–GreenEDGE claimed full responsibility for the test result, saying that the team's doctor had failed to apply for a therapeutic use exemption for an asthma inhaler used by Yates which triggered the positive test. Subsequently, the international governing body Union Cycliste Internationale (UCI) issued a statement indicating that Yates would not be provisionally suspended from competition due to the substance he had tested positive for. However, on 17 June, the UCI decided to issue a four-month ban for the "presence and use of the specified prohibited substance terbutaline", backdated from 12 March (the date the positive sample was collected), preventing Yates from competing at the 2016 Tour de France.

== Major results ==
=== Road ===
2009
4th Road race, National Junior Championships
2010
4th Road race, National Junior Championships
2011
1st Stage 6 Tour de l'Avenir
1st Twinings Tour, Premier Calendar
9th Overall Thüringen Rundfahrt der U23
2013 (1 pro win)
1st Road race, National Under-23 Championships
1st Overall Arden Challenge

1st Stage 4

3rd Overall Tour of Britain

1st Stage 6

3rd La Côte Picarde
9th Overall An Post Rás

1st Young rider classification

10th Overall Tour de l'Avenir

1st Stages 5 & 6

10th Overall Flèche du Sud
10th Overall Thüringen Rundfahrt der U23
10th Overall Czech Cycling Tour
2014
1st Mountains classification, Tour of Alberta
3rd Road race, National Championships
7th Overall Tour of Slovenia

1st Young rider classification

2015
5th Overall Critérium du Dauphiné

1st Young rider classification

5th Overall Tour of the Basque Country
6th Overall Tour de Romandie
2016 (2)
1st Prueba Villafranca de Ordizia
2nd Circuito de Getxo
4th Overall Vuelta a Burgos
6th Overall Vuelta a España

1st Stage 6

~~7th Overall Paris–Nice~~
7th Clásica de San Sebastián
2017 (3)
1st GP Miguel Induráin
2nd Overall Tour de Romandie

1st Stage 4

7th Overall Tour de France

1st Young rider classification

9th Overall Paris–Nice

1st Stage 6

2018 (8)
1st UCI World Tour
1st Overall Vuelta a España

1st Combination classification
1st Stage 14

Giro d'Italia

1st Stages 9, 11 & 15
Held after Stages 6–18
Held after Stages 9–18

2nd Overall Paris–Nice

1st Stage 7

2nd Overall Tour de Pologne

1st Stage 7

2nd Prueba Villafranca de Ordizia
4th Overall Volta a Catalunya

1st Stage 7

2019 (4)
Tour de France

1st Stages 12 & 15

Vuelta a Andalucía

1st Mountains classification
1st Stage 4

1st Stage 5 (ITT) Paris–Nice
8th Overall Giro d'Italia
2020 (2)
1st Overall Tirreno–Adriatico

1st Stage 5

3rd Overall Tour de Pologne
7th Overall Tour Down Under
10th Cadel Evans Great Ocean Road Race
2021 (3)
1st Overall Tour of the Alps

1st Stage 2

3rd Overall Giro d'Italia

1st Stage 19

4th Overall CRO Race

1st Mountains classification

9th Overall Volta a Catalunya
10th Overall Tirreno–Adriatico
2022 (8)
1st Overall Vuelta a Castilla y León

1st Stage 2

1st Prueba Villafranca de Ordizia
Giro d'Italia

1st Stages 2 (ITT) & 14

Vuelta a Asturias

1st Points classification
1st Stages 1 & 3

2nd Overall Paris–Nice

1st Stage 8

5th Overall Vuelta a Andalucía
6th Clásica de San Sebastián
2023 (1)
2nd Overall Tour Down Under

1st Stage 5

3rd Giro dell'Emilia
4th Overall Tour de France
4th Overall Paris–Nice
4th Memorial Marco Pantani
5th Giro di Lombardia
6th Grand Prix Cycliste de Montréal
9th Overall Tour of the Basque Country
2024 (2)
1st Overall AlUla Tour

1st Stage 5

5th Giro dell'Emilia
7th Overall Tour Down Under
2025 (2)
1st Overall Giro d'Italia
1st Stage 10 Tour de France
9th Overall Volta a Catalunya

==== General classification results timeline ====
Grand Tour general classification results
Grand Tour	2014	2015	2016	2017	2018	2019	2020	2021	2022	2023	2024	2025
Giro d'Italia	—	—	—	—	21	8	DNF	3	DNF	—	—	1
Tour de France	DNF	89	—	7	—	49	—	DNF	—	4	12	15
Vuelta a España	—	—	6	44	1	—	—	—	DNF	—	—	—
Major stage race general classification results
Major stage race	2014	2015	2016	2017	2018	2019	2020	2021	2022	2023	2024	2025
Paris–Nice	44	29	DSQ	9	2	25	—	—	2	4	—	—
Tirreno–Adriatico	—	—	—	—	—	—	1	10	—	—	—	14
Volta a Catalunya	—	—	—	—	4	13	NH	9	DNF	—	57	9
Tour of the Basque Country	11	5	DNF	22	—	—	NH	—	—	9	—	—
Tour de Romandie	—	6	—	2	—	—	NH	—	—	DNF	11	—
Critérium du Dauphiné	—	5	—	13	—	—	—	—	—	—	—	—
Tour de Suisse	Did not contest during his career											

==== Classics results timeline ====
Monument	2014	2015	2016	2017	2018	2019	2020	2021	2022	2023	2024	2025
Milan–San Remo	—	37	95	—	—	—	—	—	—	—	—	—
Tour of Flanders	Did not contest during his career											
Paris–Roubaix	Did not contest during his career											
Liège–Bastogne–Liège	—	39	—	153	—	—	—	—	—	—	32	—
Giro di Lombardia	DNF	18	—	—	—	—	—	86	—	5	84	—
Classic	2014	2015	2016	2017	2018	2019	2020	2021	2022	2023	2024	2025
Strade Bianche	—	—	—	—	—	—	—	63	—	—	—	—
La Flèche Wallonne	78	62	—	—	—	—	—	—	—	—	—	—
Clásica de San Sebastián	DNF	14	7	18	—	DNF	NH	22	6	—	DNF	—
Grand Prix Cycliste de Québec	22	82	—	—	—	—	Not held		—	56	54	DNF
Grand Prix Cycliste de Montréal	36	16	—	—	—	—	Not held		—	6	13	DNF
Giro dell'Emilia	—	—	DNF	—	DNF	—	—	—	DNF	3	5	—

Legend
—	Did not compete
DNF	Did not finish
DSQ	Disqualified
NH	Not held

=== Track ===
2009
3rd Madison, National Junior Championships (with Adam Yates)
2010
UCI World Junior Championships

1st Madison (with Daniel McLay)
2nd Team pursuit

National Junior Championships

1st Madison (with Adam Yates)
2nd Scratch
2nd Points race

National Championships

2nd Points race
2nd Scratch

2011
1st Six Days of Ghent Future Stars (with Owain Doull)
2nd Omnium, National Championships
3rd Team pursuit, UCI World Cup Classics, Beijing
2012
National Championships

1st Madison (with Mark Christian)
1st Omnium
1st Team pursuit

2013
1st Points race, UCI World Championships

== See also ==
- Adam Yates
- List of doping cases in cycling
