= 2013 UCI Track Cycling World Championships – Men's points race =

Rainbow jersey

The Men's points race at the 2013 UCI Track Cycling World Championships was held on February 22. 19 athletes participated in the contest. The competition consisted of 160 laps, making a total of 40 km (25 mi) with 16 sprints.

== Medalists ==
Gold	Simon Yates (GBR)
Silver	Eloy Teruel (ESP)
Bronze	Kirill Sveshnikov (RUS)

== Results ==
The race was held at 20:15.

Rank	Name	Nation	Sprint points	Lap points	Total points
1st place, gold medalist(s)	Simon Yates	Great Britain	15	20	35
2nd place, silver medalist(s)	Eloy Teruel	Spain	14	20	34
3rd place, bronze medalist(s)	Kirill Sveshnikov	Russia	10	20	30
4	Milan Kadlec	Czech Republic	10	20	30
5	Stefan Küng	Switzerland	7	20	27
6	Andreas Graf	Austria	23	0	23
7	Henning Bommel	Germany	20	0	20
8	Angelo Ciccone	Italy	19	0	19
9	Thomas Boudat	France	18	0	18
10	Kenny de Ketele	Belgium	13	0	13
11	Alex Edmondson	Australia	10	0	10
12	Jesper Morkov	Denmark	7	0	7
13	Wojciech Pszczolarski	Poland	5	0	5
14	Pavel Gatskiy	Kazakhstan	3	-20	-17
15	Raman Ramanau	Belarus	2	-60	-58
-	Wim Stroetinga	Netherlands	0	0	DNF
-	Vladimir Tuychiev	Uzbekistan	0	−20	DNF
–	Amrit Singh	India	0	−40	DNF
–	Mykhaylo Radionov	Ukraine	0	−40	DNF
