= Col de la Couillole =

Mountain pass in the French Alps

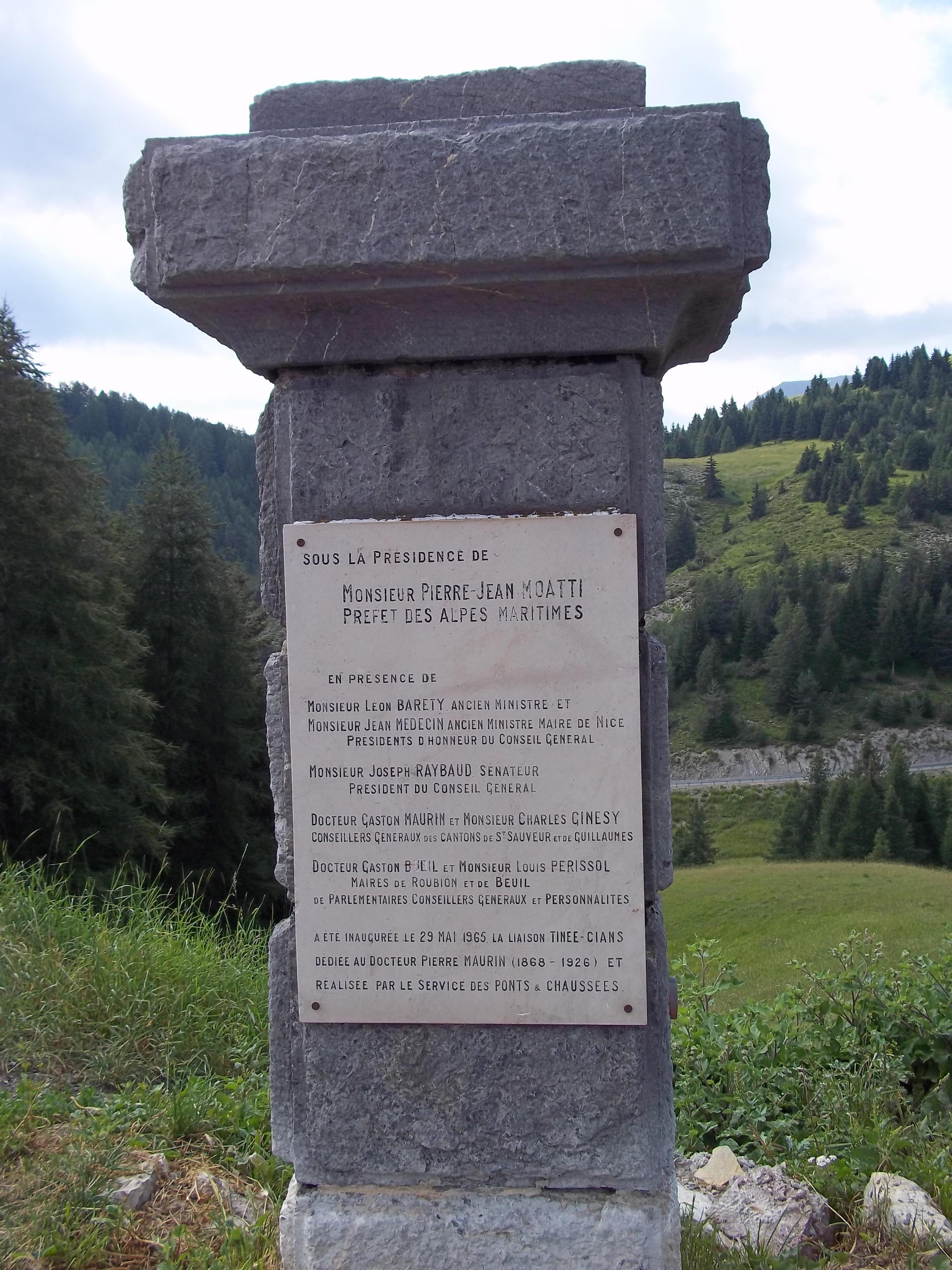
- Plaque at the summit of the Col de la Couillole

- Location within Alps
- Elevation: 1,678 metres (5,505 ft)
- Traversed by: D30 road

Third Approach
- Location: Alpes-Maritimes, Alpes-de-Haute-Provence, France
- Range: Massif du Mercantour-Argentera
- Coordinates: 44°06′00″N 7°01′23″E

The Col de la Couillole is a mountain pass in the Massif du Mercantour-Argentera of the French Alps, situated at an altitude of 1,678 m (5,505 ft) in the Alpes-Maritimes department, France. The road connection is open for six to seven months of the year, allowing travel between the Cians gorges in the west and the Tinée valley in the east.

== Etymology ==
Couillole is a modified version of cayolle from the Provençal dialect, a word designating a stony ground.

== Cycling ==
=== Tour de France ===
The Col de la Couillole was first climbed during the 1973 Tour de France on Stage 17 from Embrun to Nice. The climb was next used in the 1975 Tour de France, on 13 July 1975, during Stage 15 from Nice to Pra-Loup. The stage remained legendary because it saw Eddy Merckx lose the yellow jersey to Bernard Thévenet. Belgian Lucien Van Impe, wearing the polka dot jersey, crossed the col in the lead.

The 2024 Tour de France returned to the col for the finish of stage 20. Tadej Pogačar won the stage.

=== Paris–Nice ===
The col was at the finish of Stage 7 of the 2017 Paris–Nice, starting from Nice on 11 March 2017. This was the highest stage finish of Paris–Nice in seventy-five editions of the race. Richie Porte won the stage after an attack 3.3 km (2.1 mi) from the finish, he escaped from the leading group containing Dan Martin and Alberto Contador who finished second on the stage. Sergio Henao, fourth on the stage, took the yellow jersey from Julian Alaphilippe, the latter having been dropped earlier in the climb.

The col was again at the finish of the Stage 7 of the 2023 Paris–Nice which started from Nice on 11 March 2023. Tadej Pogačar won ahead of David Gaudu and Jonas Vingegaard.

== See also ==
- Beuil
- Roubion
