= Dampierre-en-Burly =

- Commune
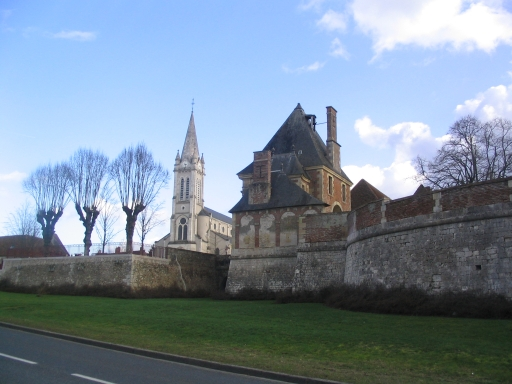
- The church and the château

- Coat of arms
- Location of Dampierre-en-Burly
- Location within France Location within Centre-Val de Loire
- Coordinates: 47°45′39″N 2°31′06″E
- Country: France
- Region: Centre-Val de Loire
- Department: Loiret
- Arrondissement: Orléans
- Canton: Sully-sur-Loire
- Intercommunality: Val de Sully

Government
  - Mayor (2020–2026): Serge Mercadié
- Area^{1}: 47.44 km^{2} (18.32 sq mi)
- Highest elevation: 161 m (528 ft)
- Lowest elevation: 117 m (384 ft)
- Population (2023): 1,466
  - Density: 30.90/km^{2} (80.04/sq mi)
- Demonym: Dampierrois
- Time zone: UTC+01:00 (CET)
  - Summer (DST): UTC+02:00 (CEST)
- INSEE/Postal code: 45122 /45570
- Website: www.dampierre-en-burly.fr
- ^{1} French Land Register data, which excludes lakes, ponds, glaciers > 1 km^{2} (0.386 sq mi or 247 acres) and river estuaries.

Dampierre-en-Burly (French pronunciation: [dɑ̃pjɛʁ ɑ̃ byʁli]) is a commune in the Loiret department in north-central France.

== Tourism and heritage ==
The commune has been awarded the “Commune à découvrir” label for its architectural and natural heritage. (1 clock in 2024)

== See also ==
- Communes of the Loiret department
