= Bazainville =

- Commune
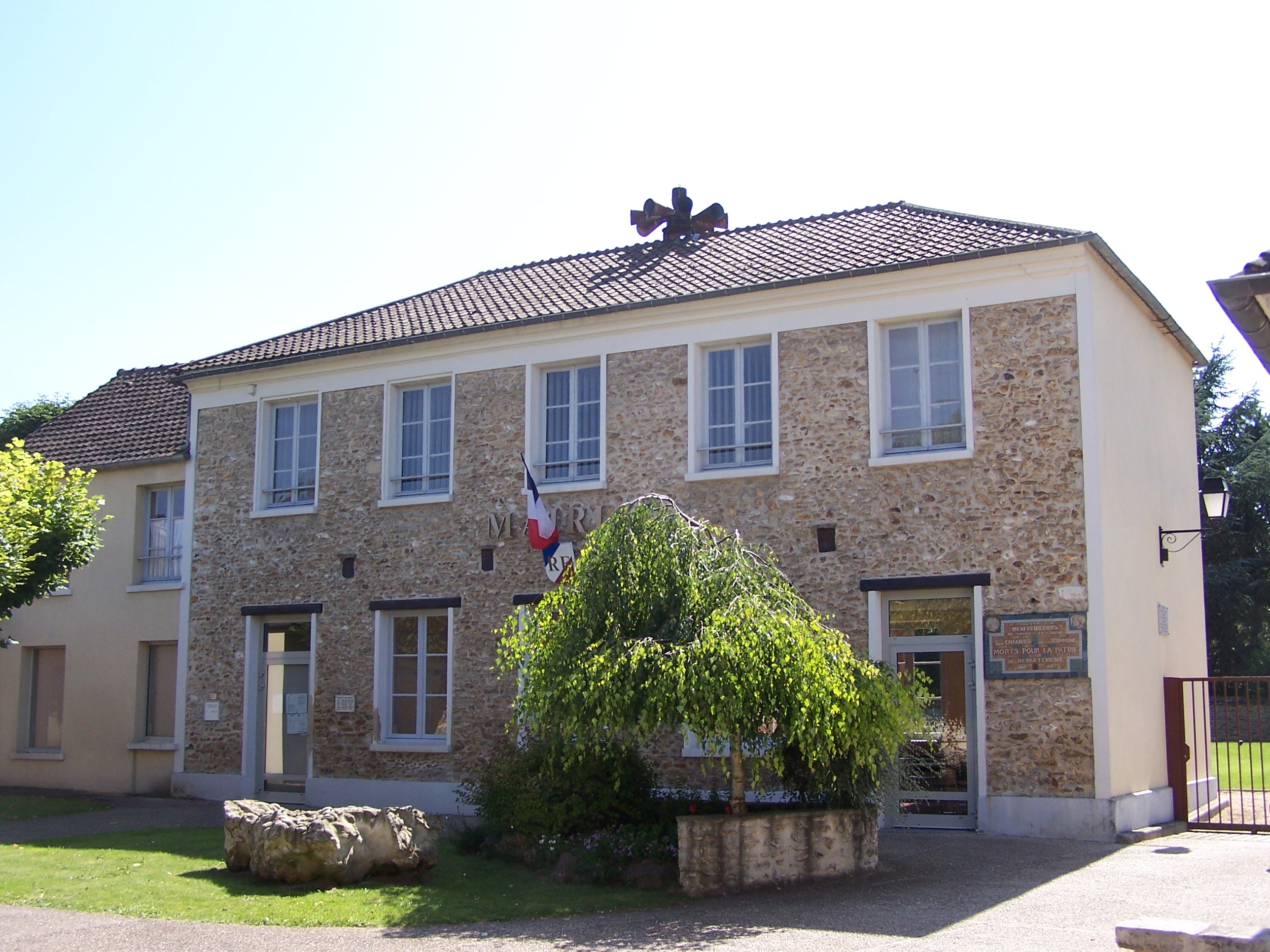
- The town hall in Bazainville

- Coat of arms
- Location of Bazainville
- Location within France Location within Île-de-France (region)
- Coordinates: 48°48′14″N 1°40′05″E
- Country: France
- Region: Île-de-France
- Department: Yvelines
- Arrondissement: Mantes-la-Jolie
- Canton: Bonnières-sur-Seine
- Intercommunality: Pays houdanais

Government
  - Mayor (2020–2026): Daniel Férédie
- Area^{1}: 12.03 km^{2} (4.64 sq mi)
- Highest elevation: 183 m (600 ft)
- Lowest elevation: 99 m (325 ft)
- Population (2023): 1,469
  - Density: 122.1/km^{2} (316.3/sq mi)
- Time zone: UTC+01:00 (CET)
  - Summer (DST): UTC+02:00 (CEST)
- INSEE/Postal code: 78048 /78550
- ^{1} French Land Register data, which excludes lakes, ponds, glaciers > 1 km^{2} (0.386 sq mi or 247 acres) and river estuaries.

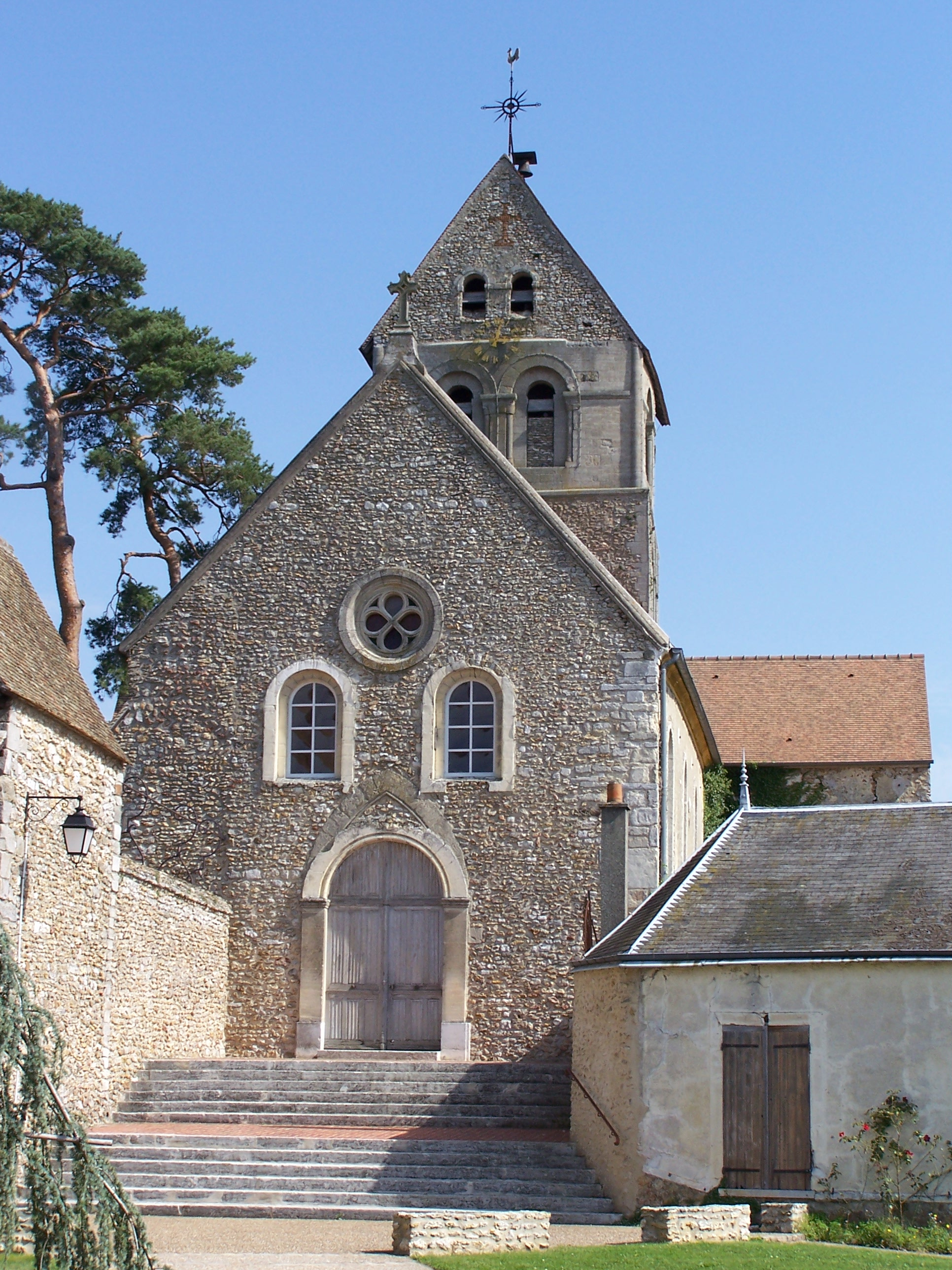
Saint-Nicolas

Bazainville (French pronunciation: [bazɛ̃vil]) is a commune in the Yvelines department in north-central France.

== See also ==
- Communes of the Yvelines department
