= List of teams and cyclists in the 2017 Tour de France =

List of cyclists

The number of riders per nation participated in the 2017 Tour de France: 20+ / 10–19 / 2–9 / 1

The 2017 Tour de France is the 104th edition of the race, one of cycling's Grand Tours. The 21-stage race takes place from 1 to 23 July 2017, starting in Düsseldorf in Germany and finishing on the Champs-Élysées in Paris. All eighteen Union Cycliste Internationale (UCI) WorldTeams were automatically invited and were obliged to attend the race. Four UCI Professional Continental teams were given wildcard places into the race by the organiser – Amaury Sport Organisation (ASO) – to complete the 22-team peloton. As each team is entitled to enter nine riders, the peloton on the first stage consists of 198 riders from 32 countries.

== Teams ==
As the Tour de France is a UCI World Tour event, all eighteen UCI WorldTeams were invited automatically and obliged to enter a team in the race. Four UCI Professional Continental teams were announced as wildcard teams on 26 January 2017, and thus completing the 22-team peloton. Of these teams, Wanty–Groupe Gobert rode the race for the first time.

UCI WorldTeams

- AG2R La Mondiale
- Astana
- Bahrain–Merida
- BMC Racing Team
- Bora–Hansgrohe
- Cannondale–Drapac
- Team Dimension Data
- FDJ
- Team Katusha–Alpecin
- LottoNL–Jumbo
- Lotto–Soudal
- Movistar Team
- Orica–Scott
- Quick-Step Floors
- Team Sky
- Team Sunweb
- Trek–Segafredo
- UAE Team Emirates

UCI Professional Continental teams

- Cofidis
- Direct Énergie
- Fortuneo–Oscaro
- Wanty–Groupe Gobert

== Cyclists ==
Legend
| No. | Starting number worn by the rider during the Tour |
| Pos. | Position in the general classification |
| Time | Deficit to the winner of the general classification |
| ‡ | Denotes riders born on or after 1 January 1992 eligible for the young rider classification |
| General classification | Denotes the winner of the general classification |
| Points classification | Denotes the winner of the points classification |
| Mountains classification | Denotes the winner of the mountains classification |
| Young rider classification | Denotes the winner of the young rider classification (eligibility indicated by ‡) |
| Team classification | Denotes riders that represent the winner of the team classification |
| Super-combativity award | Denotes the winner of the super-combativity award |
| DNS | Denotes a rider who did not start a stage, followed by the stage before which he withdrew |
| DNF | Denotes a rider who did not finish a stage, followed by the stage in which he withdrew |
| DSQ | Denotes a rider who was disqualified from the race, followed by the stage in which this occurred |
| HD | Denotes a rider finished outside the time limit, followed by the stage in which they did so |
Age correct as of Saturday 1 July 2017, the date on which the Tour began

=== By starting number ===
The following teams and cyclists took part in the 2017 Tour de France:

| No. | Name | Nationality | Team | Age | Pos. | Time | Ref. |
|---|---|---|---|---|---|---|---|
| 1 | Chris Froome | Great Britain | Team Sky | 32 | 1 | 86h 20' 55" | |
| 2 | Sergio Henao | Colombia | Team Sky | 29 | 28 | + 1h 16' 32" | |
| 3 | Vasil Kiryienka | Belarus | Team Sky | 36 | 112 | + 3h 21' 15" | |
| 4 | Christian Knees | Germany | Team Sky | 36 | 144 | + 3h 55' 31" | |
| 5 | Michał Kwiatkowski | Poland | Team Sky | 27 | 57 | + 2h 17' 48" | |
| 6 | Mikel Landa | Spain | Team Sky | 27 | 4 | + 2' 21" | |
| 7 | Mikel Nieve | Spain | Team Sky | 33 | 14 | + 25' 28" | |
| 8 | Luke Rowe | Great Britain | Team Sky | 27 | 167 | + 4h 35' 52" | |
| 9 | Geraint Thomas | Great Britain | Team Sky | 31 | DNF-9 | – | |
| 11 | Romain Bardet | France | AG2R La Mondiale | 26 | 3 | + 2' 20" | |
| 12 | Jan Bakelants | Belgium | AG2R La Mondiale | 31 | 22 | + 50' 04" | |
| 13 | Axel Domont | France | AG2R La Mondiale | 26 | 68 | + 2h 35' 33" | |
| 14 | Mathias Frank | Switzerland | AG2R La Mondiale | 30 | 30 | + 1h 21' 16" | |
| 15 | Ben Gastauer | Luxembourg | AG2R La Mondiale | 29 | 37 | + 1h 38' 33" | |
| 16 | Cyril Gautier | France | AG2R La Mondiale | 29 | 48 | + 2h 03' 24" | |
| 17 | Pierre Latour ‡ | France | AG2R La Mondiale | 23 | 29 | + 1h 18' 45" | |
| 18 | Oliver Naesen | Belgium | AG2R La Mondiale | 26 | 63 | + 2h 28' 02" | |
| 19 | Alexis Vuillermoz | France | AG2R La Mondiale | 29 | 13 | + 24' 38" | |
| 21 | Nairo Quintana | Colombia | Movistar Team | 27 | 12 | + 15' 28" | |
| 22 | Andrey Amador | Costa Rica | Movistar Team | 30 | 87 | + 2h 56' 43" | |
| 23 | Daniele Bennati | Italy | Movistar Team | 36 | 104 | + 3h 13' 44" | |
| 24 | Carlos Betancur | Colombia | Movistar Team | 27 | 18 | + 37' 47" | |
| 25 | Jonathan Castroviejo | Spain | Movistar Team | 30 | 60 | + 2h 22' 44" | |
| 26 | Imanol Erviti | Spain | Movistar Team | 33 | 92 | + 3h 00' 21" | |
| 27 | Jesús Herrada | Spain | Movistar Team | 26 | 97 | + 3h 06' 05" | |
| 28 | Jasha Sütterlin ‡ | Germany | Movistar Team | 24 | 108 | + 3h 17' 53" | |
| 29 | Alejandro Valverde | Spain | Movistar Team | 37 | DNF-1 | – | |
| 31 | Alberto Contador | Spain | Trek–Segafredo | 34 | 9 | + 8' 49" | |
| 32 | Koen de Kort | Netherlands | Trek–Segafredo | 34 | 70 | + 2h 38' 33" | |
| 33 | John Degenkolb | Germany | Trek–Segafredo | 28 | 121 | + 3h 35' 14" | |
| 34 | Fabio Felline | Italy | Trek–Segafredo | 27 | DNF-14 | – | |
| 35 | Michael Gogl ‡ | Austria | Trek–Segafredo | 23 | 146 | + 3h 59' 06" | |
| 36 | Markel Irizar | Spain | Trek–Segafredo | 37 | 135 | + 3h 47' 10" | |
| 37 | Bauke Mollema | Netherlands | Trek–Segafredo | 30 | 17 | + 37' 43" | |
| 38 | Jarlinson Pantano | Colombia | Trek–Segafredo | 28 | 46 | + 2h 01' 30" | |
| 39 | Haimar Zubeldia | Spain | Trek–Segafredo | 40 | 52 | + 2h 06' 30" | |
| 41 | Richie Porte | Australia | BMC Racing Team | 32 | DNF-9 | – | |
| 42 | Damiano Caruso | Italy | BMC Racing Team | 29 | 11 | + 14' 48" | |
| 43 | Alessandro De Marchi | Italy | BMC Racing Team | 31 | 99 | + 3h 07' 25" | |
| 44 | Stefan Küng ‡ | Switzerland | BMC Racing Team | 23 | 79 | + 2h 49' 17" | |
| 45 | Amaël Moinard | France | BMC Racing Team | 35 | 32 | + 1h 32' 02" | |
| 46 | Nicolas Roche | Ireland | BMC Racing Team | 32 | 33 | + 1h 32' 35" | |
| 47 | Michael Schär | Switzerland | BMC Racing Team | 30 | 72 | + 2h 41' 54" | |
| 48 | Greg Van Avermaet | Belgium | BMC Racing Team | 32 | 58 | + 2h 19' 14" | |
| 49 | Danilo Wyss | Switzerland | BMC Racing Team | 31 | 81 | + 2h 53' 51" | |
| 51 | Fabio Aru | Italy | Astana | 26 | 5 | + 3' 05" | |
| 52 | Dario Cataldo | Italy | Astana | 32 | DNF-11 | – | |
| 53 | Jakob Fuglsang | Denmark | Astana | 32 | DNF-13 | – | |
| 54 | Andriy Hrivko | Ukraine | Astana | 33 | 120 | + 3h 32' 14" | |
| 55 | Dmitriy Gruzdev | Kazakhstan | Astana | 31 | 115 | + 3h 24' 42" | |
| 56 | Bakhtiyar Kozhatayev ‡ | Kazakhstan | Astana | 25 | 93 | + 3h 04' 11" | |
| 57 | Alexey Lutsenko ‡ | Kazakhstan | Astana | 24 | 71 | + 2h 39' 10" | |
| 58 | Michael Valgren ‡ | Denmark | Astana | 25 | 61 | + 2h 25' 36" | |
| 59 | Andrey Zeits | Kazakhstan | Astana | 30 | 44 | + 1h 59' 09" | |
| 61 | Louis Meintjes ‡ | South Africa | UAE Team Emirates | 25 | 8 | + 8' 20" | |
| 62 | Darwin Atapuma | Colombia | UAE Team Emirates | 29 | 41 | + 1h 50' 31" | |
| 63 | Matteo Bono | Italy | UAE Team Emirates | 33 | 111 | + 3h 20' 59" | |
| 64 | Kristijan Đurasek | Croatia | UAE Team Emirates | 29 | 50 | + 2h 04' 53" | |
| 65 | Vegard Stake Laengen | Norway | UAE Team Emirates | 28 | 127 | + 3h 41' 52" | |
| 66 | Marco Marcato | Italy | UAE Team Emirates | 33 | 96 | + 3h 05' 53" | |
| 67 | Manuele Mori | Italy | UAE Team Emirates | 36 | DNF-9 | – | |
| 68 | Ben Swift | Great Britain | UAE Team Emirates | 29 | 83 | + 2h 54' 48" | |
| 69 | Diego Ulissi | Italy | UAE Team Emirates | 27 | 39 | + 1h 45' 23" | |
| 71 | Arnaud Démare | France | FDJ | 25 | HD-9 | – | |
| 72 | Davide Cimolai | Italy | FDJ | 27 | 152 | + 4h 06' 15" | |
| 73 | Mickaël Delage | France | FDJ | 31 | HD-9 | – | |
| 74 | Jacopo Guarnieri | Italy | FDJ | 29 | HD-9 | – | |
| 75 | Ignatas Konovalovas | Lithuania | FDJ | 31 | HD-9 | – | |
| 76 | Olivier Le Gac ‡ | France | FDJ | 23 | 158 | + 4h 17' 21" | |
| 77 | Rudy Molard | France | FDJ | 27 | 36 | + 1h 35' 55" | |
| 78 | Thibaut Pinot | France | FDJ | 27 | DNF-17 | – | |
| 79 | Arthur Vichot | France | FDJ | 28 | DNF-13 | – | |
| 81 | Esteban Chaves | Colombia | Orica–Scott | 27 | 62 | + 2h 27' 34" | |
| 82 | Michael Albasini | Switzerland | Orica–Scott | 36 | 98 | + 3h 06' 55" | |
| 83 | Luke Durbridge | Australia | Orica–Scott | 26 | DNF-2 | – | |
| 84 | Mathew Hayman | Australia | Orica–Scott | 39 | 151 | + 4h 05' 17" | |
| 85 | Damien Howson ‡ | Australia | Orica–Scott | 24 | 88 | + 2h 56' 57" | |
| 86 | Daryl Impey | South Africa | Orica–Scott | 32 | 47 | + 2h 01' 59" | |
| 87 | Jens Keukeleire | Belgium | Orica–Scott | 28 | 59 | + 2h 22' 26" | |
| 88 | Roman Kreuziger | Czech Republic | Orica–Scott | 31 | 24 | + 59' 58" | |
| 89 | Simon Yates ‡ | Great Britain | Orica–Scott | 24 | 7 | + 6' 14" | |
| 91 | Mark Cavendish | Great Britain | Team Dimension Data | 32 | DNS-5 | – | |
| 92 | Edvald Boasson Hagen | Norway | Team Dimension Data | 30 | 78 | + 2h 48' 12" | |
| 93 | Stephen Cummings | Great Britain | Team Dimension Data | 36 | 141 | + 3h 53' 10" | |
| 94 | Bernhard Eisel | Austria | Team Dimension Data | 36 | 153 | + 4h 10' 18" | |
| 95 | Reinardt Janse van Rensburg | South Africa | Team Dimension Data | 28 | 118 | + 3h 30' 54" | |
| 96 | Serge Pauwels | Belgium | Team Dimension Data | 33 | 19 | + 39' 36" | |
| 97 | Mark Renshaw | Australia | Team Dimension Data | 34 | HD-9 | – | |
| 98 | Scott Thwaites | Great Britain | Team Dimension Data | 27 | 107 | + 3h 16' 28" | |
| 99 | Jaco Venter | South Africa | Team Dimension Data | 30 | 162 | + 4h 20' 16" | |
| 101 | Marcel Kittel | Germany | Quick-Step Floors | 29 | DNF-17 | – | |
| 102 | Jack Bauer | New Zealand | Quick-Step Floors | 32 | 105 | + 3h 15' 13" | |
| 103 | Gianluca Brambilla | Italy | Quick-Step Floors | 29 | 53 | + 2h 06' 57" | |
| 104 | Philippe Gilbert | Belgium | Quick-Step Floors | 34 | DNS-16 | – | |
| 105 | Dan Martin | Ireland | Quick-Step Floors | 30 | 6 | + 4' 42" | |
| 106 | Fabio Sabatini | Italy | Quick-Step Floors | 32 | 154 | + 4h 10' 25" | |
| 107 | Zdeněk Štybar | Czech Republic | Quick-Step Floors | 31 | 102 | + 3h 12' 12" | |
| 108 | Matteo Trentin | Italy | Quick-Step Floors | 27 | HD-9 | – | |
| 109 | Julien Vermote | Belgium | Quick-Step Floors | 27 | 139 | + 3h 52' 54" | |
| 111 | Peter Sagan | Slovakia | Bora–Hansgrohe | 27 | DSQ-4 | – | |
| 112 | Maciej Bodnar | Poland | Bora–Hansgrohe | 32 | 116 | + 3h 26' 58" | |
| 113 | Emanuel Buchmann ‡ | Germany | Bora–Hansgrohe | 24 | 15 | + 33' 21" | |
| 114 | Marcus Burghardt | Germany | Bora–Hansgrohe | 34 | 131 | + 3h 45' 57" | |
| 115 | Rafał Majka | Poland | Bora–Hansgrohe | 27 | DNS-10 | – | |
| 116 | Jay McCarthy ‡ | Australia | Bora–Hansgrohe | 24 | 94 | + 3h 05' 13" | |
| 117 | Paweł Poljański | Poland | Bora–Hansgrohe | 27 | 80 | + 2h 53' 42" | |
| 118 | Juraj Sagan | Slovakia | Bora–Hansgrohe | 28 | HD-9 | – | |
| 119 | Rüdiger Selig | Germany | Bora–Hansgrohe | 28 | 165 | + 4h 26' 43" | |
| 121 | Tony Martin | Germany | Team Katusha–Alpecin | 32 | 101 | + 3h 10' 18" | |
| 122 | Marco Haller | Austria | Team Katusha–Alpecin | 26 | 155 | + 4h 13' 50" | |
| 123 | Reto Hollenstein | Switzerland | Team Katusha–Alpecin | 31 | 150 | + 4h 03' 45" | |
| 124 | Robert Kišerlovski | Croatia | Team Katusha–Alpecin | 30 | 31 | + 1h 25' 25" | |
| 125 | Alexander Kristoff | Norway | Team Katusha–Alpecin | 29 | 130 | + 3h 45' 40" | |
| 126 | Maurits Lammertink | Netherlands | Team Katusha–Alpecin | 26 | 75 | + 2h 44' 01" | |
| 127 | Tiago Machado | Portugal | Team Katusha–Alpecin | 31 | 74 | + 2h 43' 36" | |
| 128 | Nils Politt ‡ | Germany | Team Katusha–Alpecin | 23 | 95 | + 3h 05' 52" | |
| 129 | Rick Zabel ‡ | Germany | Team Katusha–Alpecin | 23 | 145 | + 3h 55' 48" | |
| 131 | André Greipel | Germany | Lotto–Soudal | 34 | 149 | + 4h 02' 54" | |
| 132 | Lars Bak | Denmark | Lotto–Soudal | 37 | 123 | + 3h 37' 04" | |
| 133 | Tiesj Benoot ‡ | Belgium | Lotto–Soudal | 23 | 20 | + 42' 04" | |
| 134 | Thomas De Gendt | Belgium | Lotto–Soudal | 30 | 51 | + 2h 05' 36" | |
| 135 | Tony Gallopin | France | Lotto–Soudal | 29 | 21 | + 42' 39" | |
| 136 | Adam Hansen | Australia | Lotto–Soudal | 36 | 113 | + 3h 22' 31" | |
| 137 | Jürgen Roelandts | Belgium | Lotto–Soudal | 31 | 136 | + 3h 47' 20" | |
| 138 | Marcel Sieberg | Germany | Lotto–Soudal | 35 | DNS-17 | – | |
| 139 | Tim Wellens | Belgium | Lotto–Soudal | 26 | DNF-15 | – | |
| 141 | Michael Matthews | Australia | Team Sunweb | 26 | 69 | + 2h 36' 36" | |
| 142 | Nikias Arndt | Germany | Team Sunweb | 25 | 84 | + 2h 54' 54" | |
| 143 | Warren Barguil | France | Team Sunweb | 25 | 10 | + 9' 25" | |
| 144 | Roy Curvers | Netherlands | Team Sunweb | 37 | 142 | + 3h 53' 38" | |
| 145 | Simon Geschke | Germany | Team Sunweb | 31 | 64 | + 2h 28' 57" | |
| 146 | Ramon Sinkeldam | Netherlands | Team Sunweb | 28 | 148 | + 4h 01' 54" | |
| 147 | Laurens ten Dam | Netherlands | Team Sunweb | 36 | 67 | + 2h 34' 56" | |
| 148 | Mike Teunissen ‡ | Netherlands | Team Sunweb | 24 | 129 | + 3h 43' 52" | |
| 149 | Albert Timmer | Netherlands | Team Sunweb | 32 | 157 | + 4h 16' 21" | |
| 151 | Nacer Bouhanni | France | Cofidis | 26 | 138 | + 3h 51' 29" | |
| 152 | Dimitri Claeys | Belgium | Cofidis | 30 | 163 | + 4h 25' 01" | |
| 153 | Nicolas Edet | France | Cofidis | 29 | 76 | + 2h 45' 11" | |
| 154 | Christophe Laporte ‡ | France | Cofidis | 24 | 133 | + 3h 46' 47" | |
| 155 | Cyril Lemoine | France | Cofidis | 34 | 128 | + 3h 43' 45" | |
| 156 | Luis Ángel Maté | Spain | Cofidis | 33 | 56 | + 2h 15' 28" | |
| 157 | Daniel Navarro | Spain | Cofidis | 33 | 27 | + 1h 15' 26" | |
| 158 | Florian Sénéchal ‡ | France | Cofidis | 23 | 161 | + 4h 19' 17" | |
| 159 | Julien Simon | France | Cofidis | 31 | 117 | + 3h 29' 21" | |
| 161 | Robert Gesink | Netherlands | LottoNL–Jumbo | 31 | DNF-9 | – | |
| 162 | George Bennett | New Zealand | LottoNL–Jumbo | 27 | DNF-16 | – | |
| 163 | Dylan Groenewegen ‡ | Netherlands | LottoNL–Jumbo | 24 | 156 | + 4h 16' 02" | |
| 164 | Tom Leezer | Netherlands | LottoNL–Jumbo | 31 | 166 | + 4h 32' 21" | |
| 165 | Paul Martens | Germany | LottoNL–Jumbo | 33 | 82 | + 2h 54' 14" | |
| 166 | Primož Roglič | Slovenia | LottoNL–Jumbo | 27 | 38 | + 1h 44' 41" | |
| 167 | Timo Roosen ‡ | Netherlands | LottoNL–Jumbo | 24 | DNF-19 | – | |
| 168 | Jos van Emden | Netherlands | LottoNL–Jumbo | 32 | DNF-9 | – | |
| 169 | Robert Wagner | Germany | LottoNL–Jumbo | 34 | 164 | + 4h 25' 12" | |
| 171 | Thomas Voeckler | France | Direct Énergie | 38 | 91 | + 2h 58' 51" | |
| 172 | Thomas Boudat ‡ | France | Direct Énergie | 23 | 140 | + 3h 53' 08" | |
| 173 | Lilian Calmejane ‡ | France | Direct Énergie | 24 | 35 | + 1h 35' 16" | |
| 174 | Sylvain Chavanel | France | Direct Énergie | 38 | 25 | + 1h 04' 22" | |
| 175 | Yohann Gène | France | Direct Énergie | 36 | 134 | + 3h 47' 08" | |
| 176 | Adrien Petit | France | Direct Énergie | 26 | 126 | + 3h 41' 34" | |
| 177 | Perrig Quéméneur | France | Direct Énergie | 33 | 106 | + 3h 15' 40" | |
| 178 | Romain Sicard | France | Direct Énergie | 29 | 66 | + 2h 33' 24" | |
| 179 | Angelo Tulik | France | Direct Énergie | 26 | 89 | + 2h 57' 05" | |
| 181 | Pierre Rolland | France | Cannondale–Drapac | 30 | 54 | + 2h 11' 54" | |
| 182 | Alberto Bettiol ‡ | Italy | Cannondale–Drapac | 23 | 90 | + 2h 57' 56" | |
| 183 | Patrick Bevin | New Zealand | Cannondale–Drapac | 26 | 114 | + 3h 23' 00" | |
| 184 | Nathan Brown | United States | Cannondale–Drapac | 25 | 43 | + 1h 57' 52" | |
| 185 | Simon Clarke | Australia | Cannondale–Drapac | 30 | 86 | + 2h 55' 27" | |
| 186 | Taylor Phinney | United States | Cannondale–Drapac | 27 | 159 | + 4h 18' 15" | |
| 187 | Andrew Talansky | United States | Cannondale–Drapac | 28 | 49 | + 2h 03' 27" | |
| 188 | Rigoberto Urán | Colombia | Cannondale–Drapac | 30 | 2 | + 54" | |
| 189 | Dylan van Baarle ‡ | Netherlands | Cannondale–Drapac | 25 | 77 | + 2h 47' 11" | |
| 191 | Ion Izagirre | Spain | Bahrain–Merida | 28 | DNF-1 | – | |
| 192 | Yukiya Arashiro | Japan | Bahrain–Merida | 32 | 109 | + 3h 18' 16" | |
| 193 | Grega Bole | Slovenia | Bahrain–Merida | 31 | 143 | + 3h 55' 29" | |
| 194 | Borut Božič | Slovenia | Bahrain–Merida | 36 | 160 | + 4h 18' 41" | |
| 195 | Janez Brajkovič | Slovenia | Bahrain–Merida | 33 | 45 | + 2h 00' 38" | |
| 196 | Ondřej Cink | Czech Republic | Bahrain–Merida | 26 | DNF-19 | – | |
| 197 | Sonny Colbrelli | Italy | Bahrain–Merida | 27 | 122 | + 3h 36' 22" | |
| 198 | Tsgabu Grmay | Ethiopia | Bahrain–Merida | 25 | 73 | + 2h 42' 15" | |
| 199 | Javier Moreno | Spain | Bahrain–Merida | 32 | 119 | + 3h 32' 06" | |
| 201 | Guillaume Martin ‡ | France | Wanty–Groupe Gobert | 24 | 23 | + 53' 52" | |
| 202 | Frederik Backaert | Belgium | Wanty–Groupe Gobert | 27 | 132 | + 3h 46' 36" | |
| 203 | Thomas Degand | Belgium | Wanty–Groupe Gobert | 31 | 34 | + 1h 34' 02" | |
| 204 | Marco Minnaard | Netherlands | Wanty–Groupe Gobert | 28 | 40 | + 1h 48' 11" | |
| 205 | Yoann Offredo | France | Wanty–Groupe Gobert | 30 | 110 | + 3h 20' 50" | |
| 206 | Andrea Pasqualon | Italy | Wanty–Groupe Gobert | 29 | 137 | + 3h 51' 18" | |
| 207 | Dion Smith ‡ | New Zealand | Wanty–Groupe Gobert | 24 | 124 | + 3h 39' 24" | |
| 208 | Guillaume Van Keirsbulck | Belgium | Wanty–Groupe Gobert | 26 | 147 | + 3h 59' 48" | |
| 209 | Pieter Vanspeybrouck | Belgium | Wanty–Groupe Gobert | 30 | 100 | + 3h 09' 38" | |
| 211 | Daniel McLay ‡ | Great Britain | Fortuneo–Oscaro | 25 | DNF-17 | – | |
| 212 | Maxime Bouet | France | Fortuneo–Oscaro | 30 | 55 | + 2h 13' 23" | |
| 213 | Brice Feillu | France | Fortuneo–Oscaro | 31 | 16 | + 36' 46" | |
| 214 | Élie Gesbert ‡ | France | Fortuneo–Oscaro | 22 | 85 | + 2h 55' 13" | |
| 215 | Romain Hardy | France | Fortuneo–Oscaro | 28 | 26 | + 1h 12' 51" | |
| 216 | Pierre-Luc Périchon | France | Fortuneo–Oscaro | 30 | 42 | + 1h 57' 29" | |
| 217 | Laurent Pichon | France | Fortuneo–Oscaro | 30 | 125 | + 3h 39' 45" | |
| 218 | Eduardo Sepúlveda | Argentina | Fortuneo–Oscaro | 26 | 65 | + 2h 31' 05" | |
| 219 | Florian Vachon | France | Fortuneo–Oscaro | 32 | 103 | + 3h 13' 10" | |

=== By team ===
Team Sky (SKY)
| No. | Rider | Pos. |
|---|---|---|
| 1 | Chris Froome (GBR) | 1 |
| 2 | Sergio Henao (COL) | 28 |
| 3 | Vasil Kiryienka (BLR) | 112 |
| 4 | Christian Knees (GER) | 144 |
| 5 | Michał Kwiatkowski (POL) | 57 |
| 6 | Mikel Landa (ESP) | 4 |
| 7 | Mikel Nieve (ESP) | 14 |
| 8 | Luke Rowe (GBR) | 167 |
| 9 | Geraint Thomas (GBR) | DNF-9 |
Directeur sportif: Nicolas Portal

AG2R La Mondiale (ALM)
| No. | Rider | Pos. |
|---|---|---|
| 11 | Romain Bardet (FRA) | 3 |
| 12 | Jan Bakelants (BEL) | 22 |
| 13 | Axel Domont (FRA) | 68 |
| 14 | Mathias Frank (SUI) | 30 |
| 15 | Ben Gastauer (LUX) | 37 |
| 16 | Cyril Gautier (FRA) | 48 |
| 17 | Pierre Latour (FRA) ‡ | 29 |
| 18 | Oliver Naesen (BEL) | 63 |
| 19 | Alexis Vuillermoz (FRA) | 13 |
Directeur sportif: Vincent Lavenu

Movistar Team (MOV)
| No. | Rider | Pos. |
|---|---|---|
| 21 | Nairo Quintana (COL) | 12 |
| 22 | Andrey Amador (CRC) | 87 |
| 23 | Daniele Bennati (ITA) | 104 |
| 24 | Carlos Betancur (COL) | 18 |
| 25 | Jonathan Castroviejo (ESP) | 60 |
| 26 | Imanol Erviti (ESP) | 92 |
| 27 | Jesús Herrada (ESP) | 97 |
| 28 | Jasha Sütterlin (GER) ‡ | 108 |
| 29 | Alejandro Valverde (ESP) | DNF-1 |
Directeur sportif:

Trek–Segafredo (TFS)
| No. | Rider | Pos. |
|---|---|---|
| 31 | Alberto Contador (ESP) | 9 |
| 32 | Koen de Kort (NED) | 70 |
| 33 | John Degenkolb (GER) | 121 |
| 34 | Fabio Felline (ITA) | DNF-14 |
| 35 | Michael Gogl (AUT) ‡ | 146 |
| 36 | Markel Irizar (ESP) | 135 |
| 37 | Bauke Mollema (NED) | 17 |
| 38 | Jarlinson Pantano (COL) | 46 |
| 39 | Haimar Zubeldia (ESP) | 52 |
Directeur sportif:

BMC Racing Team (BMC)
| No. | Rider | Pos. |
|---|---|---|
| 41 | Richie Porte (AUS) | DNF-9 |
| 42 | Damiano Caruso (ITA) | 11 |
| 43 | Alessandro De Marchi (ITA) | 99 |
| 44 | Stefan Küng (SUI) ‡ | 79 |
| 45 | Amaël Moinard (FRA) | 32 |
| 46 | Nicolas Roche (IRL) | 33 |
| 47 | Michael Schär (SUI) | 72 |
| 48 | Greg Van Avermaet (BEL) | 58 |
| 49 | Danilo Wyss (SUI) | 81 |
Directeur sportif: Yvon Ledanois

Astana (AST)
| No. | Rider | Pos. |
|---|---|---|
| 51 | Fabio Aru (ITA) | 5 |
| 52 | Dario Cataldo (ITA) | DNF-11 |
| 53 | Jakob Fuglsang (DEN) | DNF-13 |
| 54 | Andriy Hrivko (UKR) | 120 |
| 55 | Dmitriy Gruzdev (KAZ) | 115 |
| 56 | Bakhtiyar Kozhatayev (KAZ) ‡ | 93 |
| 57 | Alexey Lutsenko (KAZ) ‡ | 71 |
| 58 | Michael Valgren (DEN) ‡ | 61 |
| 59 | Andrey Zeits (KAZ) | 44 |
Directeur sportif: Dmitry Fofonov

UAE Team Emirates (UAD)
| No. | Rider | Pos. |
|---|---|---|
| 61 | Louis Meintjes (RSA) ‡ | 8 |
| 62 | Darwin Atapuma (COL) | 41 |
| 63 | Matteo Bono (ITA) | 111 |
| 64 | Kristijan Đurasek (CRO) | 50 |
| 65 | Vegard Stake Laengen (NOR) | 127 |
| 66 | Marco Marcato (ITA) | 96 |
| 67 | Manuele Mori (ITA) | DNF-9 |
| 68 | Ben Swift (GBR) | 83 |
| 69 | Diego Ulissi (ITA) | 39 |
Directeur sportif:

FDJ (FDJ)
| No. | Rider | Pos. |
|---|---|---|
| 71 | Arnaud Démare (FRA) | HD-9 |
| 72 | Davide Cimolai (ITA) | 152 |
| 73 | Mickaël Delage (FRA) | HD-9 |
| 74 | Jacopo Guarnieri (ITA) | HD-9 |
| 75 | Ignatas Konovalovas (LTU) | HD-9 |
| 76 | Olivier Le Gac (FRA) ‡ | 158 |
| 77 | Rudy Molard (FRA) | 36 |
| 78 | Thibaut Pinot (FRA) | DNF-17 |
| 79 | Arthur Vichot (FRA) | DNF-13 |
Directeur sportif: Thierry Bricaud

Orica–Scott (ORS)
| No. | Rider | Pos. |
|---|---|---|
| 81 | Esteban Chaves (COL) | 62 |
| 82 | Michael Albasini (SUI) | 98 |
| 83 | Luke Durbridge (AUS) | DNF-2 |
| 84 | Mathew Hayman (AUS) | 151 |
| 85 | Damien Howson (AUS) ‡ | 88 |
| 86 | Daryl Impey (RSA) | 47 |
| 87 | Jens Keukeleire (BEL) | 59 |
| 88 | Roman Kreuziger (CZE) | 24 |
| 89 | Simon Yates (GBR) ‡ | 7 |
Directeur sportif: Matthew White

Team Dimension Data (DDD)
| No. | Rider | Pos. |
|---|---|---|
| 91 | Mark Cavendish (GBR) | DNS-5 |
| 92 | Edvald Boasson Hagen (NOR) | 78 |
| 93 | Stephen Cummings (GBR) | 141 |
| 94 | Bernhard Eisel (AUT) | 153 |
| 95 | Reinardt Janse van Rensburg (RSA) | 118 |
| 96 | Serge Pauwels (BEL) | 19 |
| 97 | Mark Renshaw (AUS) | HD-9 |
| 98 | Scott Thwaites (GBR) | 107 |
| 99 | Jaco Venter (RSA) | 162 |
Directeur sportif:

Quick-Step Floors (QST)
| No. | Rider | Pos. |
|---|---|---|
| 101 | Marcel Kittel (GER) | DNF-17 |
| 102 | Jack Bauer (NZL) | 105 |
| 103 | Gianluca Brambilla (ITA) | 53 |
| 104 | Philippe Gilbert (BEL) | DNS-16 |
| 105 | Dan Martin (IRL) | 6 |
| 106 | Fabio Sabatini (ITA) | 154 |
| 107 | Zdeněk Štybar (CZE) | 102 |
| 108 | Matteo Trentin (ITA) | HD-9 |
| 109 | Julien Vermote (BEL) | 139 |
Directeur sportif:

Bora–Hansgrohe (BOH)
| No. | Rider | Pos. |
|---|---|---|
| 111 | Peter Sagan (SVK) | DSQ-4 |
| 112 | Maciej Bodnar (POL) | 116 |
| 113 | Emanuel Buchmann (GER) ‡ | 15 |
| 114 | Marcus Burghardt (GER) | 131 |
| 115 | Rafał Majka (POL) | DNS-10 |
| 116 | Jay McCarthy (AUS) ‡ | 94 |
| 117 | Paweł Poljański (POL) | 80 |
| 118 | Juraj Sagan (SVK) | HD-9 |
| 119 | Rüdiger Selig (GER) | 165 |
Directeur sportif:

Team Katusha–Alpecin (KAT)
| No. | Rider | Pos. |
|---|---|---|
| 121 | Tony Martin (GER) | 101 |
| 122 | Marco Haller (AUT) | 155 |
| 123 | Reto Hollenstein (SUI) | 150 |
| 124 | Robert Kišerlovski (CRO) | 31 |
| 125 | Alexander Kristoff (NOR) | 130 |
| 126 | Maurits Lammertink (NED) | 75 |
| 127 | Tiago Machado (POR) | 74 |
| 128 | Nils Politt (GER) ‡ | 95 |
| 129 | Rick Zabel (GER) ‡ | 145 |
Directeur sportif: José Azevedo

Lotto–Soudal (LTS)
| No. | Rider | Pos. |
|---|---|---|
| 131 | André Greipel (GER) | 149 |
| 132 | Lars Bak (DEN) | 123 |
| 133 | Tiesj Benoot (BEL) ‡ | 20 |
| 134 | Thomas De Gendt (BEL) | 51 |
| 135 | Tony Gallopin (FRA) | 21 |
| 136 | Adam Hansen (AUS) | 113 |
| 137 | Jürgen Roelandts (BEL) | 136 |
| 138 | Marcel Sieberg (GER) | DNS-17 |
| 139 | Tim Wellens (BEL) | DNF-15 |
Directeur sportif:

Team Sunweb (SUN)
| No. | Rider | Pos. |
|---|---|---|
| 141 | Michael Matthews (AUS) | 69 |
| 142 | Nikias Arndt (GER) | 84 |
| 143 | Warren Barguil (FRA) | 10 |
| 144 | Roy Curvers (NED) | 142 |
| 145 | Simon Geschke (GER) | 64 |
| 146 | Ramon Sinkeldam (NED) | 148 |
| 147 | Laurens ten Dam (NED) | 67 |
| 148 | Mike Teunissen (NED) ‡ | 129 |
| 149 | Albert Timmer (NED) | 157 |
Directeur sportif: Luke Roberts

Cofidis (COF)
| No. | Rider | Pos. |
|---|---|---|
| 151 | Nacer Bouhanni (FRA) | 138 |
| 152 | Dimitri Claeys (BEL) | 163 |
| 153 | Nicolas Edet (FRA) | 76 |
| 154 | Christophe Laporte (FRA) ‡ | 133 |
| 155 | Cyril Lemoine (FRA) | 128 |
| 156 | Luis Ángel Maté (ESP) | 56 |
| 157 | Daniel Navarro (ESP) | 27 |
| 158 | Florian Sénéchal (FRA) ‡ | 161 |
| 159 | Julien Simon (FRA) | 117 |
Directeur sportif:

LottoNL–Jumbo (TLJ)
| No. | Rider | Pos. |
|---|---|---|
| 161 | Robert Gesink (NED) | DNF-9 |
| 162 | George Bennett (NZL) | DNF-16 |
| 163 | Dylan Groenewegen (NED) ‡ | 156 |
| 164 | Tom Leezer (NED) | 166 |
| 165 | Paul Martens (GER) | 82 |
| 166 | Primož Roglič (SLO) | 38 |
| 167 | Timo Roosen (NED) ‡ | DNF-19 |
| 168 | Jos van Emden (NED) | DNF-9 |
| 169 | Robert Wagner (GER) | 164 |
Directeur sportif:

Direct Énergie (DEN)
| No. | Rider | Pos. |
|---|---|---|
| 171 | Thomas Voeckler (FRA) | 91 |
| 172 | Thomas Boudat (FRA) | 140 |
| 173 | Lilian Calmejane (FRA) | 35 |
| 174 | Sylvain Chavanel (FRA) | 25 |
| 175 | Yohann Gène (FRA) | 134 |
| 176 | Adrien Petit (FRA) | 126 |
| 177 | Perrig Quéméneur (FRA) | 106 |
| 178 | Romain Sicard (FRA) | 66 |
| 179 | Angelo Tulik (FRA) | 89 |
Directeur sportif:

Cannondale–Drapac (CDT)
| No. | Rider | Pos. |
|---|---|---|
| 181 | Pierre Rolland (FRA) | 54 |
| 182 | Alberto Bettiol (ITA) ‡ | 90 |
| 183 | Patrick Bevin (NZL) | 114 |
| 184 | Nathan Brown (USA) | 43 |
| 185 | Simon Clarke (AUS) | 86 |
| 186 | Taylor Phinney (USA) | 159 |
| 187 | Andrew Talansky (USA) | 49 |
| 188 | Rigoberto Urán (COL) | 2 |
| 189 | Dylan van Baarle (NED) ‡ | 77 |
Directeur sportif:

Bahrain–Merida (TBM)
| No. | Rider | Pos. |
|---|---|---|
| 191 | Ion Izagirre (ESP) | DNF-1 |
| 192 | Yukiya Arashiro (JPN) | 109 |
| 193 | Grega Bole (SLO) | 143 |
| 194 | Borut Božič (SLO) | 160 |
| 195 | Janez Brajkovič (SLO) | 45 |
| 196 | Ondřej Cink (CZE) | DNF-19 |
| 197 | Sonny Colbrelli (ITA) | 122 |
| 198 | Tsgabu Grmay (ETH) | 73 |
| 199 | Javier Moreno (ESP) | 119 |
Directeur sportif:

Wanty–Groupe Gobert (WGG)
| No. | Rider | Pos. |
|---|---|---|
| 201 | Guillaume Martin (FRA) ‡ | 23 |
| 202 | Frederik Backaert (BEL) | 132 |
| 203 | Thomas Degand (BEL) | 34 |
| 204 | Marco Minnaard (NED) | 40 |
| 205 | Yoann Offredo (FRA) | 110 |
| 206 | Andrea Pasqualon (ITA) | 137 |
| 207 | Dion Smith (NZL) ‡ | 124 |
| 208 | Guillaume Van Keirsbulck (BEL) | 147 |
| 209 | Pieter Vanspeybrouck (BEL) | 100 |
Directeur sportif: Steven De Neef

Fortuneo–Oscaro (TFO)
| No. | Rider | Pos. |
|---|---|---|
| 211 | Daniel McLay (GBR) ‡ | DNF-17 |
| 212 | Maxime Bouet (FRA) | 55 |
| 213 | Brice Feillu (FRA) | 16 |
| 214 | Élie Gesbert (FRA) ‡ | 85 |
| 215 | Romain Hardy (FRA) | 26 |
| 216 | Pierre-Luc Périchon (FRA) | 42 |
| 217 | Laurent Pichon (FRA) | 125 |
| 218 | Eduardo Sepúlveda (ARG) | 65 |
| 219 | Florian Vachon (FRA) | 103 |
Directeur sportif: Denis Leproux

=== By nationality ===
The 198 riders that competed in the 2017 Tour de France originated from 32 different countries.

| Country | No. of riders | Finishers | Stage wins |
|---|---|---|---|
| Argentina | 1 | 1 | |
| Australia | 9 | 6 | 2 (Michael Matthews ×2) |
| Austria | 3 | 3 | |
| Belarus | 1 | 1 | |
| Belgium | 16 | 14 | |
| Colombia | 7 | 7 | 1 (Rigoberto Urán) |
| Costa Rica | 1 | 1 | |
| Croatia | 2 | 2 | |
| Czech Republic | 3 | 2 | |
| Denmark | 3 | 2 | |
| Ethiopia | 1 | 1 | |
| France | 39 | 35 | 5 (Arnaud Démare, Lilian Calmejane, Romain Bardet, Warren Barguil ×2) |
| Germany | 16 | 14 | 5 (Marcel Kittel ×5) |
| Great Britain | 9 | 6 | 1 (Geraint Thomas) |
| Ireland | 2 | 2 | |
| Italy | 18 | 13 | 1 (Fabio Aru) |
| Japan | 1 | 1 | |
| Kazakhstan | 4 | 4 | |
| Lithuania | 1 | 0 | |
| Luxembourg | 1 | 1 | |
| Netherlands | 15 | 12 | 2 (Bauke Mollema, Dylan Groenewegen) |
| New Zealand | 4 | 3 | |
| Norway | 3 | 3 | 1 (Edvald Boasson Hagen) |
| Poland | 4 | 3 | 1 (Maciej Bodnar) |
| Portugal | 1 | 1 | |
| Slovakia | 2 | 0 | 1 (Peter Sagan) |
| Slovenia | 4 | 4 | 1 (Primož Roglič) |
| South Africa | 4 | 4 | |
| Spain | 13 | 11 | |
| Switzerland | 6 | 6 | |
| Ukraine | 1 | 1 | |
| United States | 3 | 3 | |
| Total | 198 | 167 | 21 |
