= Chassal-Molinges =

Commune in Bourgogne-Franche-Comté, France

- Commune
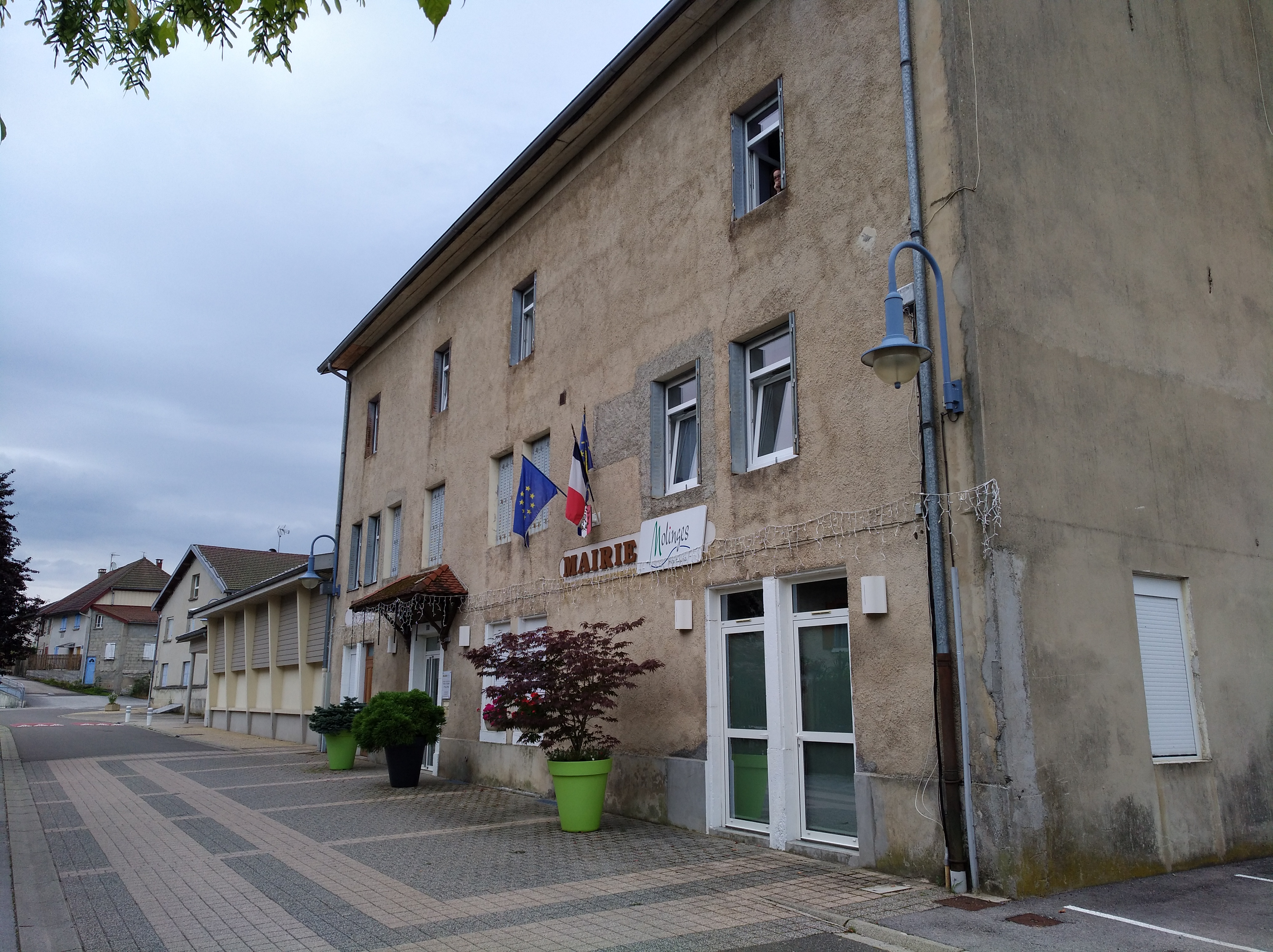
- The town hall in Chassal-Molinges
- Location of Chassal-Molinges
- Location within France Location within Bourgogne-Franche-Comté
- Coordinates: 46°21′25″N 5°45′57″E
- Country: France
- Region: Bourgogne-Franche-Comté
- Department: Jura
- Arrondissement: Saint-Claude
- Canton: Coteaux du Lizon

Government
  - Mayor (2020–2026): Jean-François Demarchi
- Area^{1}: 7.76 km^{2} (3.00 sq mi)
- Highest elevation: 686 m (2,251 ft)
- Lowest elevation: 334 m (1,096 ft)
- Population (2023): 1,113
  - Density: 143/km^{2} (371/sq mi)
- Time zone: UTC+01:00 (CET)
  - Summer (DST): UTC+02:00 (CEST)
- INSEE/Postal code: 39339 /39360
- ^{1} French Land Register data, which excludes lakes, ponds, glaciers > 1 km^{2} (0.386 sq mi or 247 acres) and river estuaries.

Chassal-Molinges (French pronunciation: [ʃasal mɔlɛ̃ʒ]) is a commune in the Jura department in Bourgogne-Franche-Comté in eastern France. It was established on 1 January 2019 by merger of the former communes of Molinges (the seat) and Chassal.

== See also ==
- Communes of the Jura department
