= Molinges =

Commune in Jura, France

- Part of Chassal-Molinges
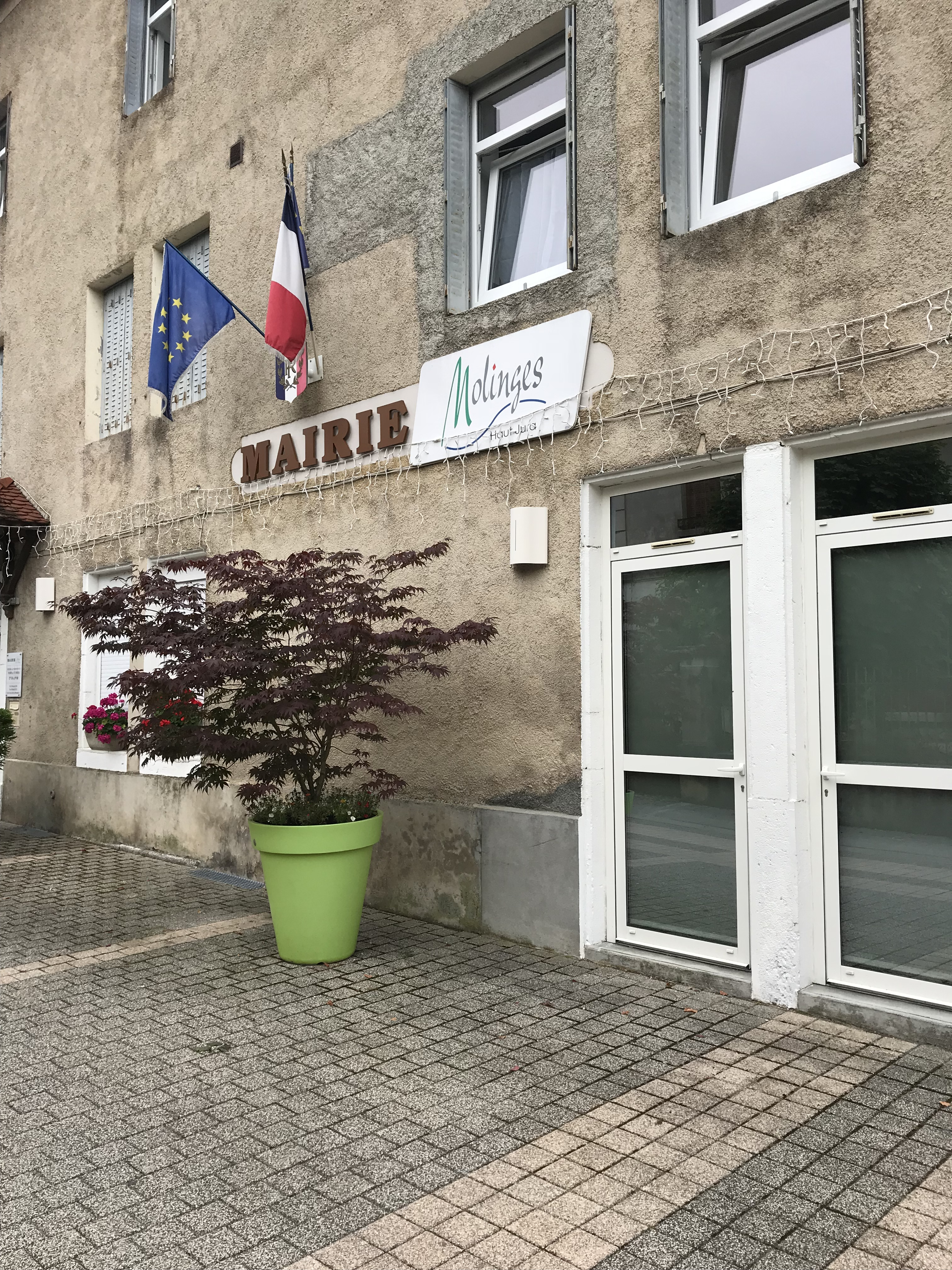
- Town hall
- Location of Molinges
- Location within France Location within Bourgogne-Franche-Comté
- Coordinates: 46°21′25″N 5°45′57″E
- Country: France
- Region: Bourgogne-Franche-Comté
- Department: Jura
- Arrondissement: Saint-Claude
- Canton: Saint-Lupicin
- Commune: Chassal-Molinges
- Area^{1}: 2.57 km^{2} (0.99 sq mi)
- Highest elevation: 686 m (2,251 ft)
- Lowest elevation: 334 m (1,096 ft)
- Population (2019): 697
  - Density: 271/km^{2} (702/sq mi)
- Time zone: UTC+01:00 (CET)
  - Summer (DST): UTC+02:00 (CEST)
- Postal code: 39360
- ^{1} French Land Register data, which excludes lakes, ponds, glaciers > 1 km^{2} (0.386 sq mi or 247 acres) and river estuaries.

Molinges is a commune in the Jura department in Bourgogne-Franche-Comté in eastern France. On 1 January 2019, it was merged into the new commune Chassal-Molinges.

== See also ==
- Communes of the Jura department
