= 2017 Tour de France, Stage 1 to Stage 11 =

Cycling race stages

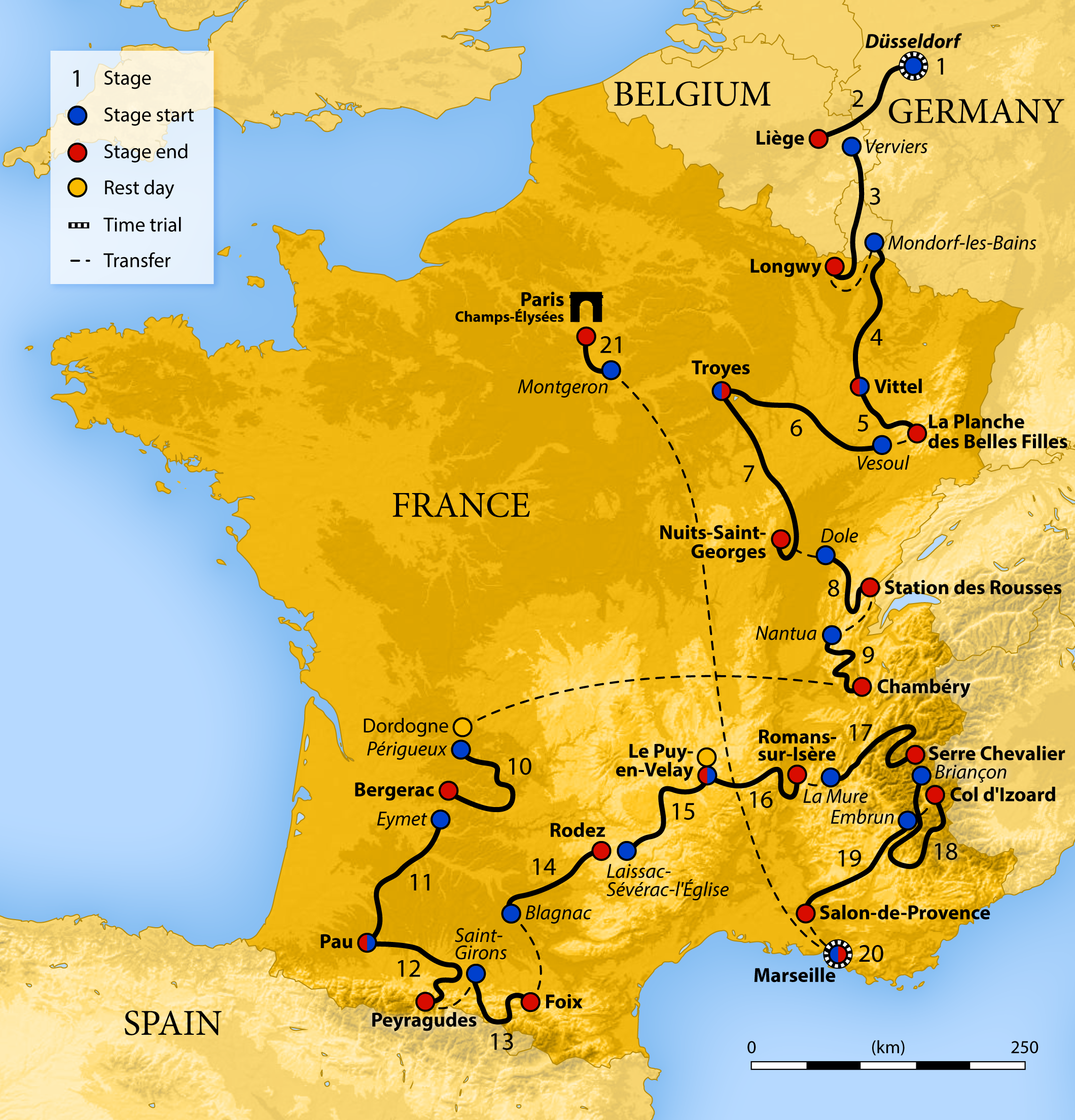
Route of the 2017 Tour de France

The 2017 Tour de France is the 104th edition of the cycle race, one of cycling's Grand Tours. The race started in Düsseldorf, Germany on 1 July, with stage 11 occurring on 12 July with a stage finish in Pau. The race finished on the Champs-Élysées in Paris on 23 July.

== Classification standings ==
Legend
A yellow jersey.	Denotes the leader of the general classification	A white jersey with red polka dots.	Denotes the leader of the mountains classification
A green jersey.	Denotes the leader of the points classification	A white jersey.	Denotes the leader of the young rider classification
A white jersey with a yellow number bib.	Denotes the leader of the team classification	A white jersey with a red number bib.	Denotes the winner of the combativity award

== Stage 1 ==
1 July 2017 — Düsseldorf to Düsseldorf, 14 km (9 mi), individual time trial (ITT)

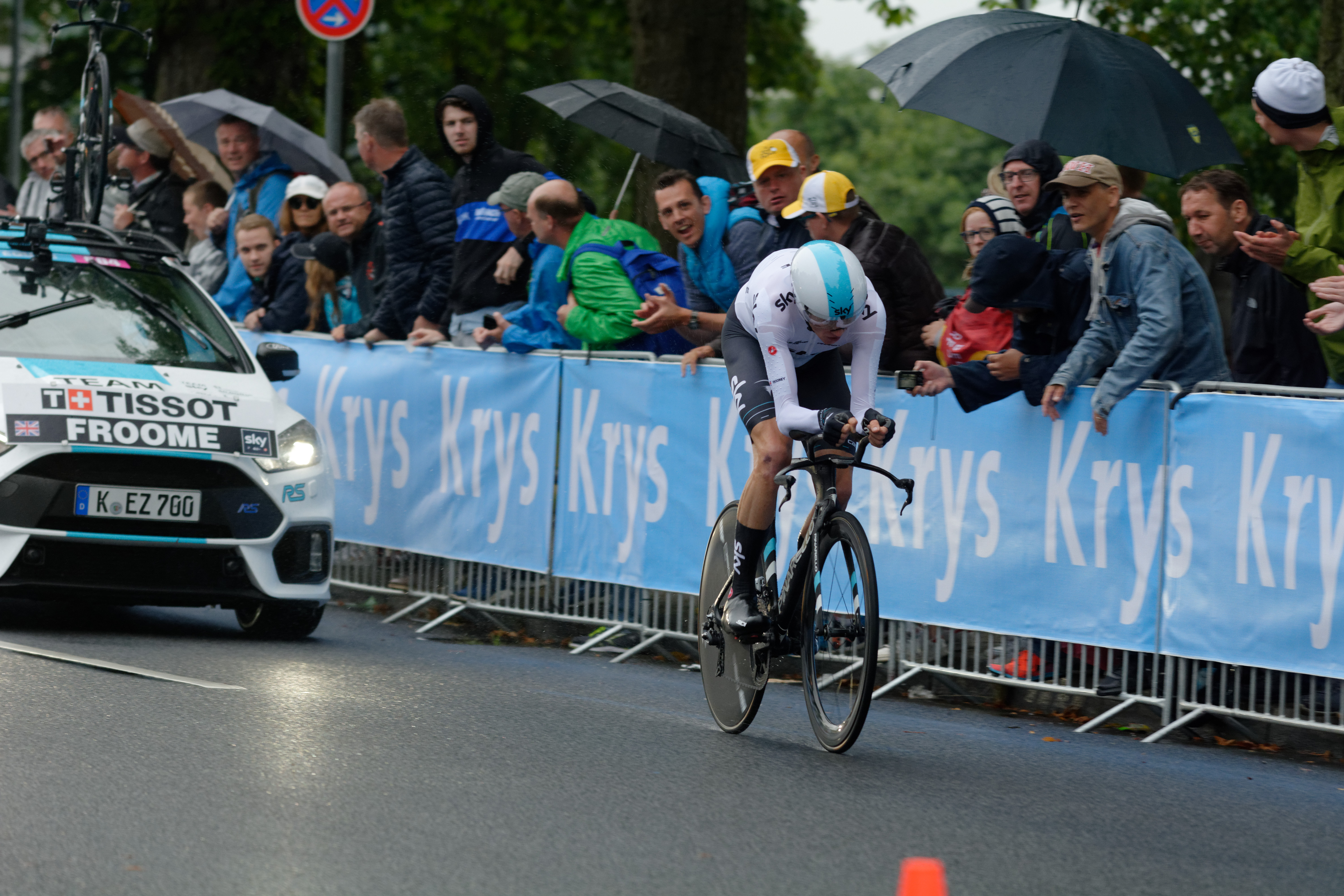
Chris Froome, the previous year's overall winner, during the Stage 1 time trial

The tour began on 1 July 2017 in Germany, with an individual time trial that started and finished in Düsseldorf. The flat course started alongside the Messe Düsseldorf and followed the right bank of the Rhine, southwards, before crossing the river at the Oberkasseler Bridge and then crossing back at the Rhineknee Bridge. After the intermediate time check at the Königsallee, the route headed back towards the Messe Düsseldorf.

The time trial was held in wet conditions, which saw numerous riders crash. Alejandro Valverde (Movistar Team) and Ion Izagirre (Bahrain–Merida) suffered the most serious of these crashes, with both riders forced to abandon the Tour.

Stage 1 result & General classification after Stage 1
Rank	Rider	Team	Time
1	Geraint Thomas (GBR)	Team Sky	16' 04"
2	Stefan Küng (SUI)	BMC Racing Team	+ 5"
3	Vasil Kiryienka (BLR)	Team Sky	+ 7"
4	Tony Martin (GER)	Team Katusha–Alpecin	+ 8"
5	Matteo Trentin (ITA)	Quick-Step Floors	+ 10"
6	Chris Froome (GBR)	Team Sky	+ 12"
7	Jos van Emden (NED)	LottoNL–Jumbo	+ 15"
8	Michał Kwiatkowski (POL)	Team Sky	+ 15"
9	Marcel Kittel (GER)	Quick-Step Floors	+ 16"
10	Edvald Boasson Hagen (NOR)	Team Dimension Data	+ 16"

== Stage 2 ==
2 July 2017 — Düsseldorf to Liège, 203.5 km (126 mi)

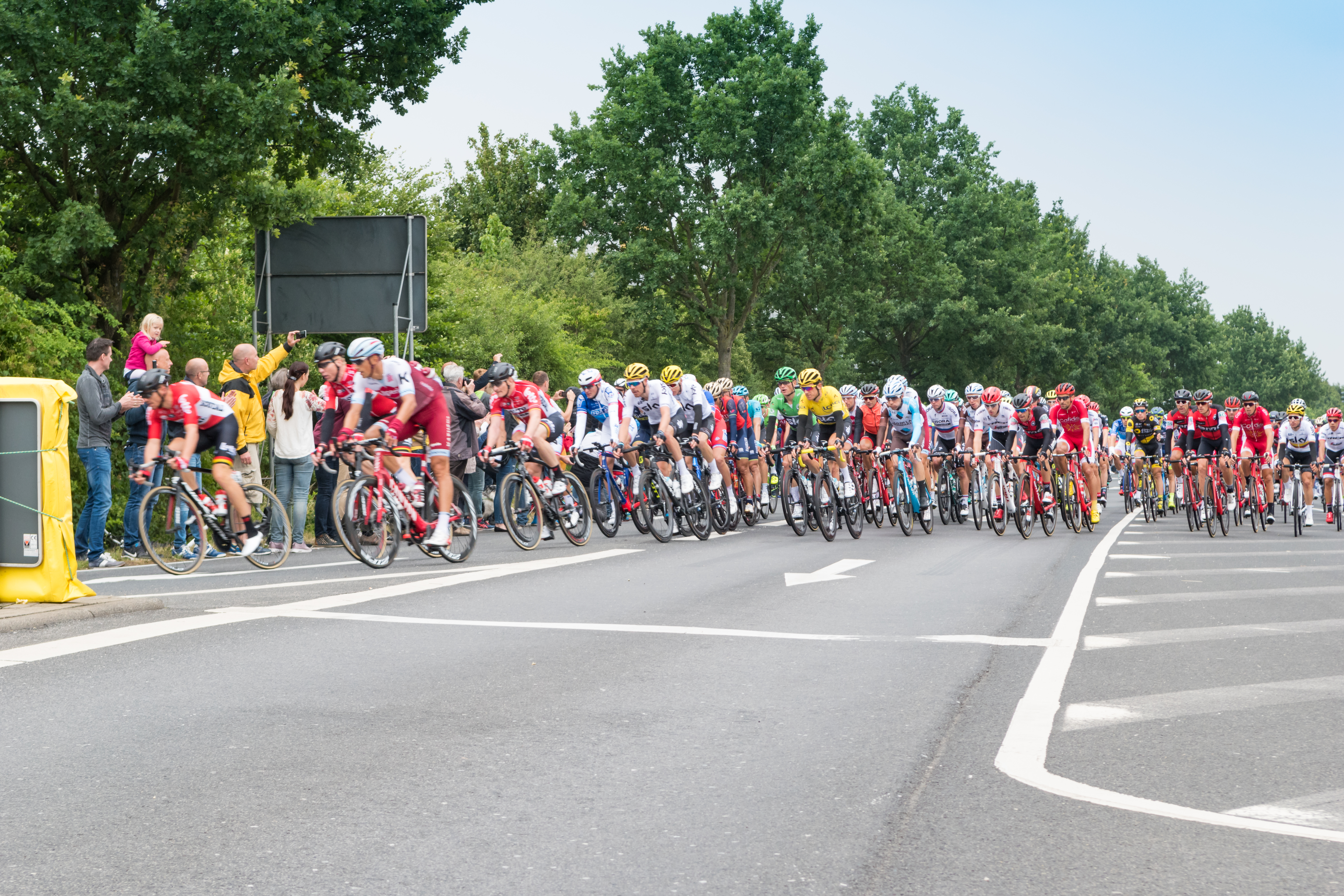
The peloton passing through Büttgen, between Düsseldorf and Mönchengladbach, on stage 2

This flat stage departed from Düsseldorf and quickly headed over the category 4 climb of the Côte de Grafenberg. The race then looped east through Mettmann and Ratingen and headed back west, through the outskirts of Düsseldorf, to the first intermediate sprint at Mönchengladbach. The peloton then travelled south through Jülich and continued southwest through Aachen, before crossing the border into Belgium. The race continued through Kelmis and Herve to the category 4 climb of the Côte d'Olne, and the riders then headed west through Chaudfontaine, before the stage finish in Liege.

Stage 2 result
Rank	Rider	Team	Time
1	Marcel Kittel (GER)	Quick-Step Floors	4h 37' 06"
2	Arnaud Démare (FRA)	FDJ	+ 0"
3	André Greipel (GER)	Lotto–Soudal	+ 0"
4	Mark Cavendish (GBR)	Team Dimension Data	+ 0"
5	Dylan Groenewegen (NED)	LottoNL–Jumbo	+ 0"
6	Sonny Colbrelli (ITA)	Bahrain–Merida	+ 0"
7	Ben Swift (GBR)	UAE Team Emirates	+ 0"
8	Nacer Bouhanni (FRA)	Cofidis	+ 0"
9	Michael Matthews (AUS)	Team Sunweb	+ 0"
10	Peter Sagan (SVK)	Bora–Hansgrohe	+ 0"

General classification after Stage 2
Rank	Rider	Team	Time
1	Geraint Thomas (GBR)	Team Sky	4h 53' 10"
2	Stefan Küng (SUI)	BMC Racing Team	+ 5"
3	Marcel Kittel (GER)	Quick-Step Floors	+ 6"
4	Vasil Kiryienka (BLR)	Team Sky	+ 7"
5	Matteo Trentin (ITA)	Quick-Step Floors	+ 10"
6	Chris Froome (GBR)	Team Sky	+ 12"
7	Jos van Emden (NED)	LottoNL–Jumbo	+ 15"
8	Michał Kwiatkowski (POL)	Team Sky	+ 15"
9	Edvald Boasson Hagen (NOR)	Team Dimension Data	+ 16"
10	Nikias Arndt (GER)	Team Sunweb	+ 16"

== Stage 3 ==
3 July 2017 — Verviers to Longwy, 212.5 km (132 mi)

This undulating stage departed south from Verviers in Belgium, and headed over the category 4 Côte de Sart in the first 20 km (12 mi). The route then used part of the Circuit de Spa-Francorchamps before heading through Stavelot, Trois-Ponts and Vielsalm. The riders then crossed into Luxembourg and travelled through Troisvierges. An intermediate sprint took place at Wincrange, and the race then continued over the category 4 Côte de Wiltz and the category 3 Côte d'Eschdorf. After descending through Grosbous, the race passed through Saeul, Kehlen, Dippach and Esch-sur-Alzette, before crossing into France at Audun-le-Tiche. The route then turned west through Villerupt, headed over the category 4 climb of the Côte de Villers-la-Montagne and turned north at Chenières. The race then had an uphill finish on the 1.6 km (0.99 mi) climb of the category 3 Côte des Religieuses in Longwy.

Stage 3 result
Rank	Rider	Team	Time
1	Peter Sagan (SVK)	Bora–Hansgrohe	5h 07' 19"
2	Michael Matthews (AUS)	Team Sunweb	+ 0"
3	Dan Martin (IRL)	Quick-Step Floors	+ 0"
4	Greg Van Avermaet (BEL)	BMC Racing Team	+ 0"
5	Alberto Bettiol (ITA)	Cannondale–Drapac	+ 2"
6	Arnaud Démare (FRA)	FDJ	+ 2"
7	Jakob Fuglsang (DEN)	Astana	+ 2"
8	Geraint Thomas (GBR)	Team Sky	+ 2"
9	Chris Froome (GBR)	Team Sky	+ 2"
10	Rafał Majka (POL)	Bora–Hansgrohe	+ 2"

General classification after Stage 3
Rank	Rider	Team	Time
1	Geraint Thomas (GBR)	Team Sky	10h 00' 31"
2	Chris Froome (GBR)	Team Sky	+ 12"
3	Michael Matthews (AUS)	Team Sunweb	+ 12"
4	Peter Sagan (SVK)	Bora–Hansgrohe	+ 13"
5	Edvald Boasson Hagen (NOR)	Team Dimension Data	+ 16"
6	Pierre Latour (FRA)	AG2R La Mondiale	+ 25"
7	Philippe Gilbert (BEL)	Quick-Step Floors	+ 30"
8	Michał Kwiatkowski (POL)	Team Sky	+ 32"
9	Tim Wellens (BEL)	Lotto–Soudal	+ 32"
10	Nikias Arndt (GER)	Team Sunweb	+ 34"

== Stage 4 ==
4 July 2017 — Mondorf-les-Bains to Vittel, 207.5 km (129 mi)

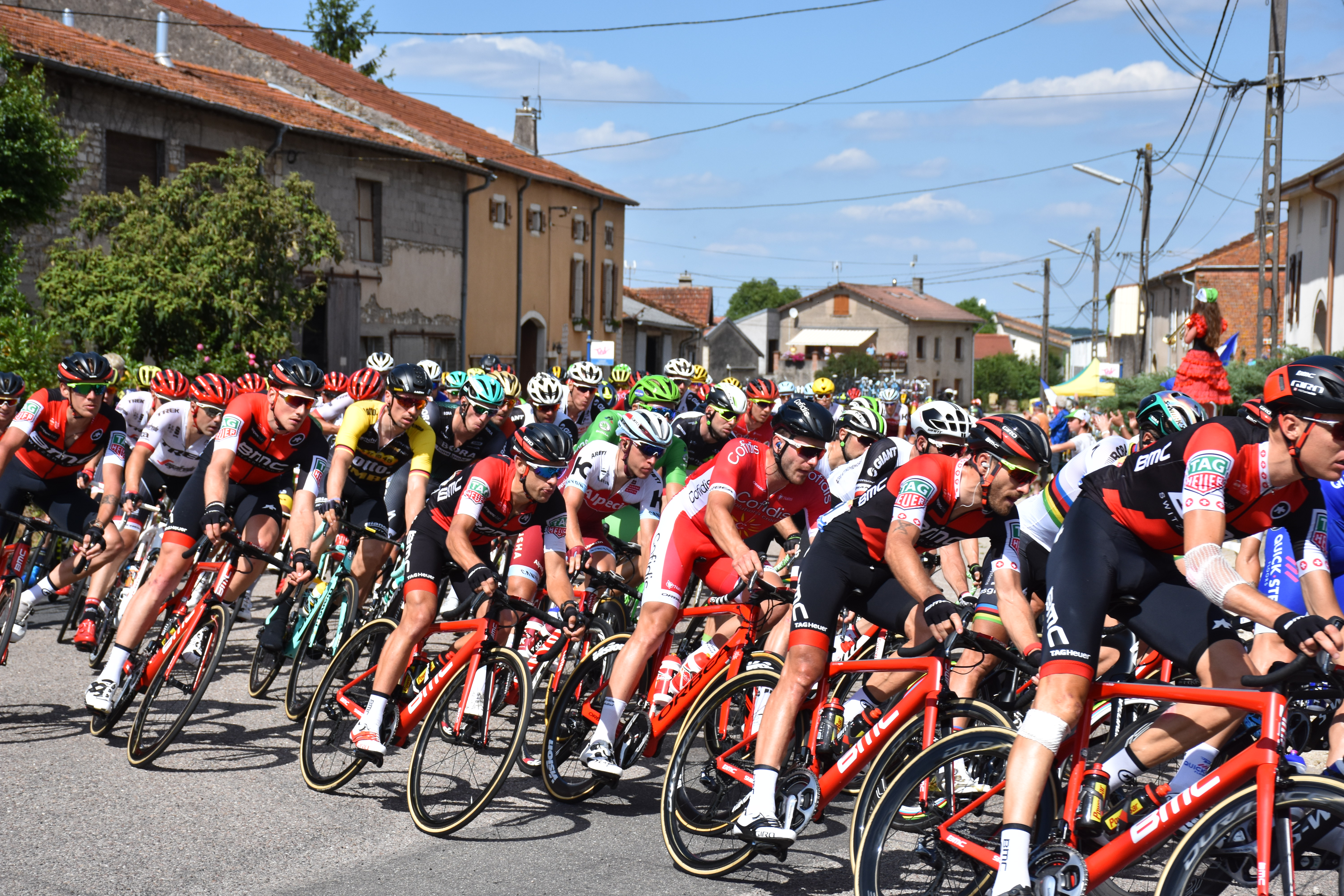
The peloton passing through Lalœuf, 45 km (28 mi) from the stage finish

This flat stage departed east from Mondorf-les-Bains in Luxembourg and crossed the border, heading south, from Schengen to Contz-les-Bains. The riders then headed south-west to Thionville, turned south for Maizières-lès-Metz and then west for Saint-Privat-la-Montagne. The race continued south through Ars-sur-Moselle, Pont-à-Mousson, Dieulouard and Toul. An intermediate sprint took place at Goviller, before the category 4 climb of the Col des Trois Fontaines. The race continued through Gironcourt-sur-Vraine to the finish line in Vittel.

Peter Sagan (Bora–Hansgrohe), who finished second to FDJ's Arnaud Démare, was initially demoted to 115th after contact with Mark Cavendish (Team Dimension Data) during the sprint, which resulted in Cavendish, Ben Swift (UAE Team Emirates) and John Degenkolb (Trek–Segafredo) hitting the ground. Sagan was also penalised 30 seconds in the general classification – dropping him out of the top-ten overall – and 80 points in the points classification: a 50-point penalty plus the 30 he had initially gained for second place on the stage. Later at a press conference, Sagan was disqualified from the race.

Stage 4 result
Rank	Rider	Team	Time
1	Arnaud Démare (FRA)	FDJ	4h 53' 54"
2	Alexander Kristoff (NOR)	Team Katusha–Alpecin	+ 0"
3	André Greipel (GER)	Lotto–Soudal	+ 0"
4	Nacer Bouhanni (FRA)	Cofidis	+ 0"
5	Adrien Petit (FRA)	Direct Énergie	+ 0"
6	Jürgen Roelandts (BEL)	Lotto–Soudal	+ 0"
7	Michael Matthews (AUS)	Team Sunweb	+ 0"
8	Manuele Mori (ITA)	UAE Team Emirates	+ 0"
9	Tiesj Benoot (BEL)	Lotto–Soudal	+ 0"
10	Zdeněk Štybar (CZE)	Quick-Step Floors	+ 0"

General classification after Stage 4
Rank	Rider	Team	Time
1	Geraint Thomas (GBR)	Team Sky	14h 54' 25"
2	Chris Froome (GBR)	Team Sky	+ 12"
3	Michael Matthews (AUS)	Team Sunweb	+ 12"
4	Edvald Boasson Hagen (NOR)	Team Dimension Data	+ 16"
5	Pierre Latour (FRA)	AG2R La Mondiale	+ 25"
6	Philippe Gilbert (BEL)	Quick-Step Floors	+ 30"
7	Michał Kwiatkowski (POL)	Team Sky	+ 32"
8	Tim Wellens (BEL)	Lotto–Soudal	+ 32"
9	Arnaud Démare (FRA)	FDJ	+ 33"
10	Nikias Arndt (GER)	Team Sunweb	+ 34"

== Stage 5 ==
5 July 2017 — Vittel to La Planche des Belles Filles, 160.5 km (100 mi)

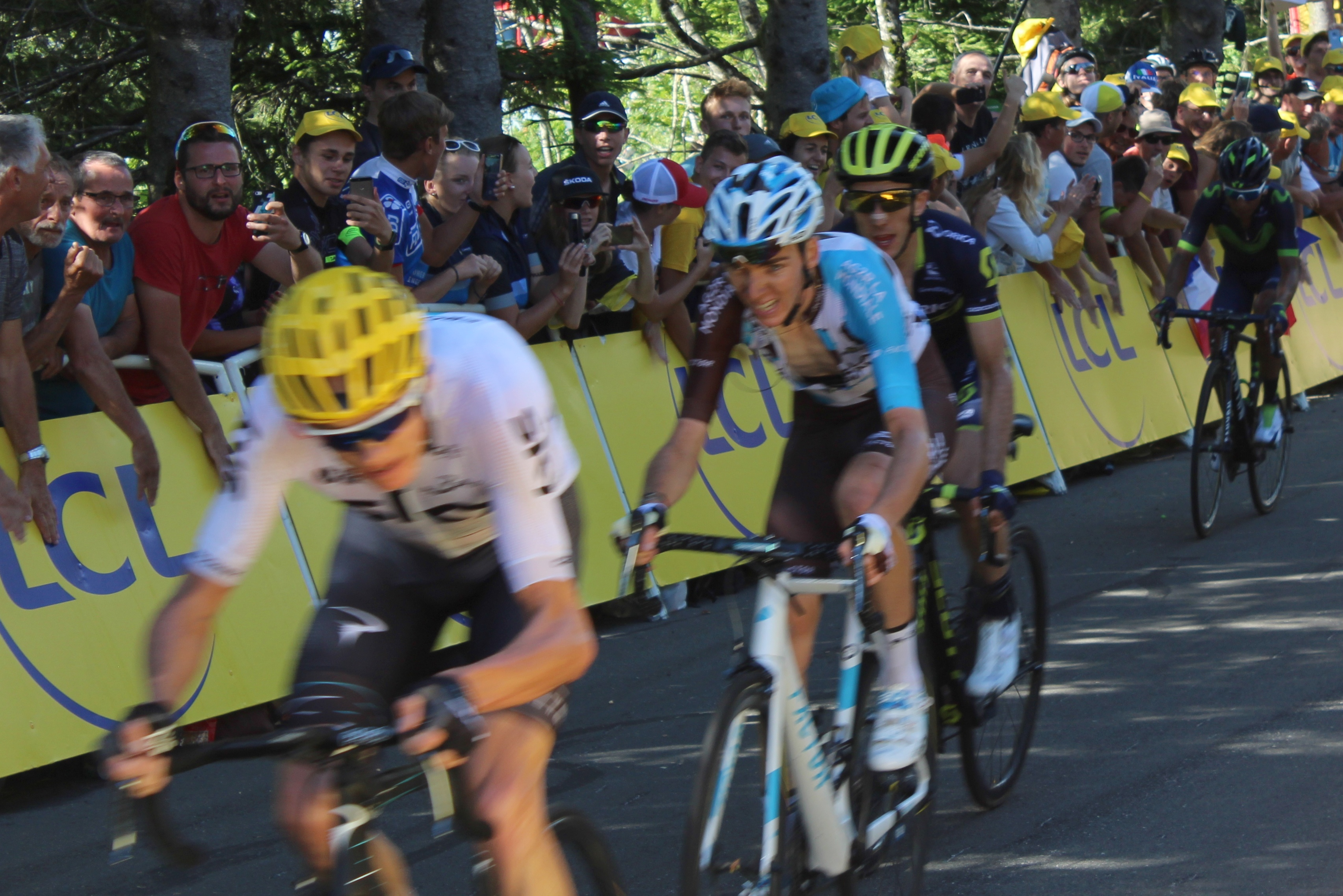
Chris Froome, Romain Bardet, Simon Yates and Nairo Quintana on the climb to la Planche des Belles Filles

This low mountain stage departed from Vittel and headed east, with racing beginning at Valleroy-le-Sec, where the peloton turned south. The riders then travelled through Darney and again turned east at Demangevelle, heading to Saint-Loup-sur-Semouse. The peloton then turned south to Ormoiche and then north-east to Luxeuil-les-Bains, continuing north to Fougerolles. The race continued east to an intermediate sprint at Faucogney, before the category 3 climb of the Côte d'Esmoulières at 573 m (1,880 ft). The route continued into an uncategorised climb for approximately 10 km (6.2 mi), before descending south-west through Servance to Belonchamp. The race then continued west through Plancher-les-Mines, before the 5.9 km (3.7 mi) category 1 climb to La Planche des Belles Filles at 1,035 m (3,396 ft).

Following the previous day's accident, Cavendish was diagnosed with a right scapular fracture and did not start the stage.

Stage 5 result
Rank	Rider	Team	Time
1	Fabio Aru (ITA)	Astana	3h 44' 06"
2	Dan Martin (IRL)	Quick-Step Floors	+ 16"
3	Chris Froome (GBR)	Team Sky	+ 20"
4	Richie Porte (AUS)	BMC Racing Team	+ 20"
5	Romain Bardet (FRA)	AG2R La Mondiale	+ 24"
6	Simon Yates (GBR)	Orica–Scott	+ 26"
7	Rigoberto Urán (COL)	Cannondale–Drapac	+ 26"
8	Alberto Contador (ESP)	Trek–Segafredo	+ 26"
9	Nairo Quintana (COL)	Movistar Team	+ 34"
10	Geraint Thomas (GBR)	Team Sky	+ 40"

General classification after Stage 5
Rank	Rider	Team	Time
1	Chris Froome (GBR)	Team Sky	18h 38' 59"
2	Geraint Thomas (GBR)	Team Sky	+ 12"
3	Fabio Aru (ITA)	Astana	+ 14"
4	Dan Martin (IRL)	Quick-Step Floors	+ 25"
5	Richie Porte (AUS)	BMC Racing Team	+ 39"
6	Simon Yates (GBR)	Orica–Scott	+ 43"
7	Romain Bardet (FRA)	AG2R La Mondiale	+ 47"
8	Alberto Contador (ESP)	Trek–Segafredo	+ 52"
9	Nairo Quintana (COL)	Movistar Team	+ 54"
10	Rafał Majka (POL)	Bora–Hansgrohe	+ 1' 01"

== Stage 6 ==
6 July 2017 — Vesoul to Troyes, 216 km (134 mi)

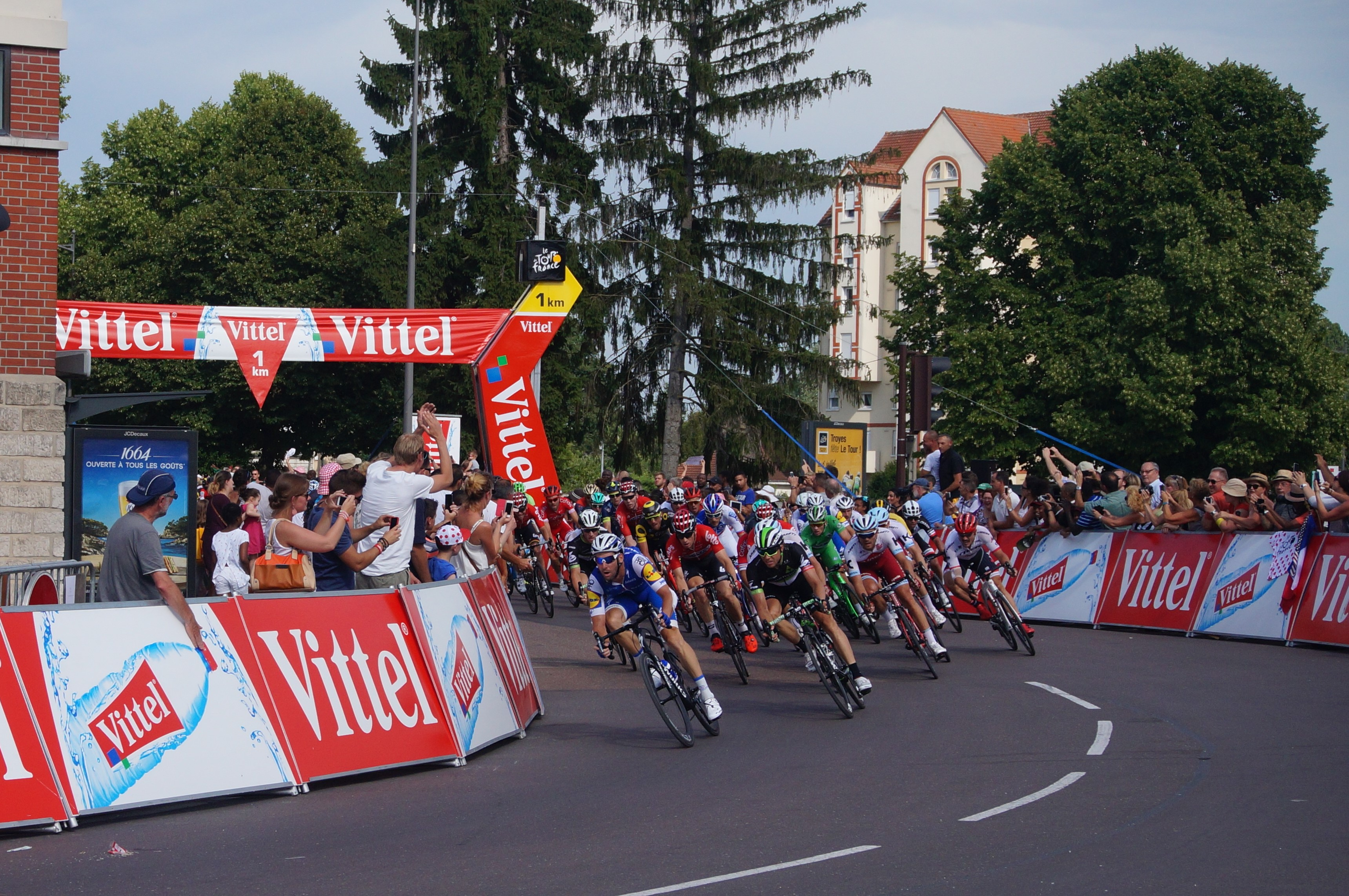
The peloton passing the flamme rouge, entering Troyes

This flat stage departed west from Vesoul, with the race starting after passing through Vaivre-et-Montoille. The peloton continued through Fayl-Billot for the category 4 climb of the Côte de Langres. The riders then went north-west towards Chaumont, which was followed by an intermediate sprint at Colombey-les-Deux-Églises. After continuing west through Bar-sur-Aube, the peloton then climbed the category 4 Côte de la colline Sainte-Germaine. The route then passed through Vendeuvre-sur-Barse and Rouilly-Sacey, before crossing the Seine at Pont-Sainte-Marie and heading to the finish line in Troyes.

Stage 6 result
Rank	Rider	Team	Time
1	Marcel Kittel (GER)	Quick-Step Floors	5h 05' 34"
2	Arnaud Démare (FRA)	FDJ	+ 0"
3	André Greipel (GER)	Lotto–Soudal	+ 0"
4	Alexander Kristoff (NOR)	Team Katusha–Alpecin	+ 0"
5	Nacer Bouhanni (FRA)	Cofidis	+ 0"
6	Dylan Groenewegen (NED)	LottoNL–Jumbo	+ 0"
7	Michael Matthews (AUS)	Team Sunweb	+ 0"
8	Daniel McLay (GBR)	Fortuneo–Oscaro	+ 0"
9	Rüdiger Selig (GER)	Bora–Hansgrohe	+ 0"
10	John Degenkolb (GER)	Trek–Segafredo	+ 0"

General classification after Stage 6
Rank	Rider	Team	Time
1	Chris Froome (GBR)	Team Sky	23h 44' 33"
2	Geraint Thomas (GBR)	Team Sky	+ 12"
3	Fabio Aru (ITA)	Astana	+ 14"
4	Dan Martin (IRL)	Quick-Step Floors	+ 25"
5	Richie Porte (AUS)	BMC Racing Team	+ 39"
6	Simon Yates (GBR)	Orica–Scott	+ 43"
7	Romain Bardet (FRA)	AG2R La Mondiale	+ 47"
8	Alberto Contador (ESP)	Trek–Segafredo	+ 52"
9	Nairo Quintana (COL)	Movistar Team	+ 54"
10	Rafał Majka (POL)	Bora–Hansgrohe	+ 1' 01"

== Stage 7 ==
7 July 2017 — Troyes to Nuits-Saint-Georges, 213.5 km (133 mi)

This flat stage departed south-east from Troyes, with the race starting outside the city centre. The peloton continued through Verrières, and went in a southerly direction through Bar-sur-Seine and Châtillon-sur-Seine, to an intermediate sprint at Chanceaux. After passing through Saint-Martin-du-Mont and Mâlain, the riders then climbed the category 4 Côte d'Urcy. The race then took a circuitous clockwise route through Gevrey-Chambertin, Gilly-lès-Cîteaux, Villebichot, Auvillars-sur-Saône and Corgoloin, to the finish line in Nuits-Saint-Georges.

A difference of only 0.0003 seconds was judged by photo finish to separate the winner Marcel Kittel from Edvald Boasson Hagen, second.

Stage 7 result
Rank	Rider	Team	Time
1	Marcel Kittel (GER)	Quick-Step Floors	5h 03' 18"
2	Edvald Boasson Hagen (NOR)	Team Dimension Data	+ 0"
3	Michael Matthews (AUS)	Team Sunweb	+ 0"
4	Alexander Kristoff (NOR)	Team Katusha–Alpecin	+ 0"
5	John Degenkolb (GER)	Trek–Segafredo	+ 0"
6	Dylan Groenewegen (NED)	LottoNL–Jumbo	+ 0"
7	Rüdiger Selig (GER)	Bora–Hansgrohe	+ 0"
8	Nacer Bouhanni (FRA)	Cofidis	+ 0"
9	André Greipel (GER)	Lotto–Soudal	+ 0"
10	Daniel McLay (GBR)	Fortuneo–Oscaro	+ 0"

General classification after Stage 7
Rank	Rider	Team	Time
1	Chris Froome (GBR)	Team Sky	28h 47' 51"
2	Geraint Thomas (GBR)	Team Sky	+ 12"
3	Fabio Aru (ITA)	Astana	+ 14"
4	Dan Martin (IRL)	Quick-Step Floors	+ 25"
5	Richie Porte (AUS)	BMC Racing Team	+ 39"
6	Simon Yates (GBR)	Orica–Scott	+ 43"
7	Romain Bardet (FRA)	AG2R La Mondiale	+ 47"
8	Alberto Contador (ESP)	Trek–Segafredo	+ 52"
9	Nairo Quintana (COL)	Movistar Team	+ 54"
10	Rafał Majka (POL)	Bora–Hansgrohe	+ 1' 01"

== Stage 8 ==
8 July 2017 — Dole to Station des Rousses, 187.5 km (117 mi)

This hilly stage departed from Dole, heading south-east through Arbois, to an intermediate sprint at Montrond. The riders continued south through Champagnole, Mont-sur-Monnet and Bonlieu, before the category 3 climb of Col de la Joux to 1,043 m (3,422 ft). The race then descended to Chassal and continued into the category 2 Côte de Viry at 748 m (2,454 ft). After turning north-east and descending to Saint-Claude, the riders then ascended south-east into the 11.7 km (7.3 mi) category 1 climb of Montée de la Combe de Laisia Les Molunes at 1,202 m (3,944 ft), before continuing north-east, on the plateau, to the finish line at Station des Rousses.

Stage 8 result
Rank	Rider	Team	Time
1	Lilian Calmejane (FRA)	Direct Énergie	4h 30' 29"
2	Robert Gesink (NED)	LottoNL–Jumbo	+ 37"
3	Guillaume Martin (FRA)	Wanty–Groupe Gobert	+ 50"
4	Nicolas Roche (IRL)	BMC Racing Team	+ 50"
5	Roman Kreuziger (CZE)	Orica–Scott	+ 50"
6	Fabio Aru (ITA)	Astana	+ 50"
7	Michael Valgren (DEN)	Astana	+ 50"
8	Rafał Majka (POL)	Bora–Hansgrohe	+ 50"
9	Nathan Brown (USA)	Cannondale–Drapac	+ 50"
10	Romain Hardy (FRA)	Fortuneo–Oscaro	+ 50"

General classification after Stage 8
Rank	Rider	Team	Time
1	Chris Froome (GBR)	Team Sky	33h 19' 10"
2	Geraint Thomas (GBR)	Team Sky	+ 12"
3	Fabio Aru (ITA)	Astana	+ 14"
4	Dan Martin (IRL)	Quick-Step Floors	+ 25"
5	Richie Porte (AUS)	BMC Racing Team	+ 39"
6	Simon Yates (GBR)	Orica–Scott	+ 43"
7	Romain Bardet (FRA)	AG2R La Mondiale	+ 47"
8	Alberto Contador (ESP)	Trek–Segafredo	+ 52"
9	Nairo Quintana (COL)	Movistar Team	+ 54"
10	Rafał Majka (POL)	Bora–Hansgrohe	+ 1' 01"

== Stage 9 ==
9 July 2017 — Nantua to Chambéry, 181.5 km (113 mi)

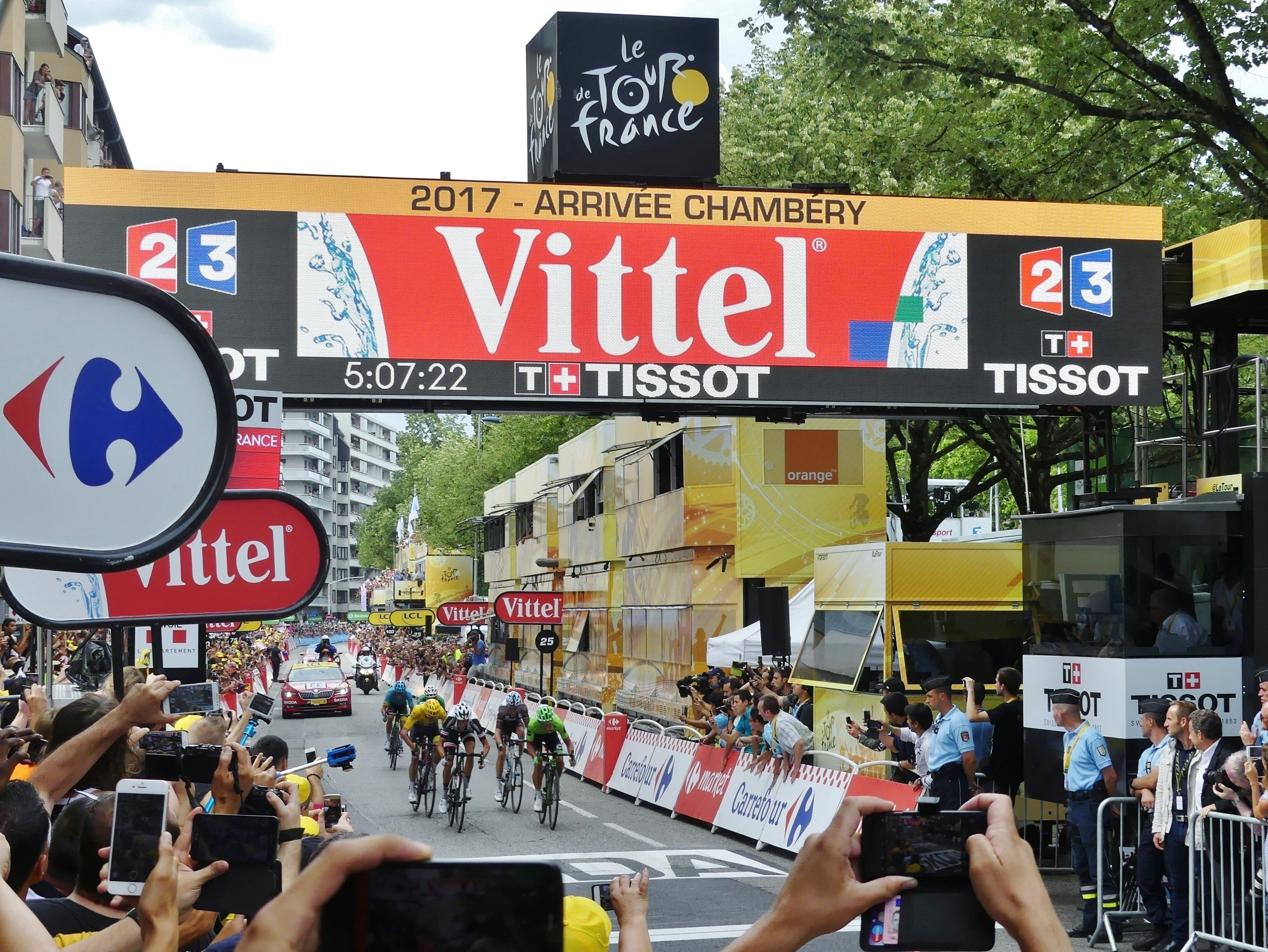
The lead group of six riders, crossing the finish line in Chambéry

This mountain stage departed east from Nantua, with the race starting at Les Neyrolles. The category 2 climb of Côte des Neyrolles and the category 3 Col de Bérentin at 1,144 m (3,753 ft) occurred in the early part of the stage. The peloton continued south-east, crossing the Génissiat Dam, prior to ascending the category 3 Côte de Franclens at 484 m (1,588 ft). After a gradual descent south into Seyssel, the riders turned east and commenced the 10.5 km (6.5 mi) ascent of the Hors catégorie Col de la Biche at 1,316 m (4,318 ft). The race then descended south through Virieu-le-Petit and turned east into the 8.5 km (5.3 mi) ascent of the Hors catégorie Col du Grand Colombier at 1,501 m (4,925 ft). Turning south at Anglefort, the riders continued through Culoz, to an intermediate sprint at Massignieu-de-Rives. To the south-east, the category 4 Côte de Jongieux at 414 m (1,358 ft) was followed by the 8.7 km (5.4 mi) climb of the Hors catégorie Signal du Mont du Chat at 1,504 m (4,934 ft). The final descent of the stage was to Le Bourget-du-Lac, before the finish line in Chambéry.

Both Geraint Thomas and Richie Porte were forced to withdraw with bone fractures, after suffering crashes on the descents of the Col de la Biche and the Mont du Chat, respectively. Other withdrawals included Robert Gesink, Manuele Mori and Jesús Herrada.

Stage 9 result
Rank	Rider	Team	Time
1	Rigoberto Urán (COL)	Cannondale–Drapac	5h 07' 22"
2	Warren Barguil (FRA)	Team Sunweb	+ 0"
3	Chris Froome (GBR)	Team Sky	+ 0"
4	Romain Bardet (FRA)	AG2R La Mondiale	+ 0"
5	Fabio Aru (ITA)	Astana	+ 0"
6	Jakob Fuglsang (DEN)	Astana	+ 0"
7	George Bennett (NZL)	LottoNL–Jumbo	+ 1' 15"
8	Mikel Landa (ESP)	Team Sky	+ 1' 15"
9	Dan Martin (IRL)	Quick-Step Floors	+ 1' 15"
10	Nairo Quintana (COL)	Movistar Team	+ 1' 15"

General classification after Stage 9
Rank	Rider	Team	Time
1	Chris Froome (GBR)	Team Sky	38h 26' 28"
2	Fabio Aru (ITA)	Astana	+ 18"
3	Romain Bardet (FRA)	AG2R La Mondiale	+ 51"
4	Rigoberto Urán (COL)	Cannondale–Drapac	+ 55"
5	Jakob Fuglsang (DEN)	Astana	+ 1' 37"
6	Dan Martin (IRL)	Quick-Step Floors	+ 1' 44"
7	Simon Yates (GBR)	Orica–Scott	+ 2' 02"
8	Nairo Quintana (COL)	Movistar Team	+ 2' 13"
9	Mikel Landa (ESP)	Team Sky	+ 3' 06"
10	George Bennett (NZL)	LottoNL–Jumbo	+ 3' 53"

== Rest day 1 ==
10 July 2017 — Dordogne

After suffering injuries in a crash on the previous stage, Rafał Majka decided to withdraw from the race on the first rest day.

== Stage 10 ==
11 July 2017 — Périgueux to Bergerac, 178 km (111 mi)

This flat stage departed south-east from Périgueux, with the race starting before reaching Saint-Laurent-sur-Manoire. The peloton continued east through Saint-Crépin-d'Auberoche and Fossemagne to Thenon. After heading south-east through Auriac-du-Périgord and then turning south-west at Montignac, the riders turned east at Les Eyzies-de-Tayac-Sireuil and headed south from Sarlat-la-Canéda to the category 4 climb of the Côte de Domme. The race then continued west to an intermediate sprint at Saint-Cyprien, and then passed through Siorac-en-Périgord and Le Buisson-de-Cadouin, before reaching the category 4 climb of the Côte du Buisson-de-Cadouin. The riders continued through Lalinde and Creysse, before going around the south side of Bergerac and reaching the finish line from the western side of the city.

Stage 10 result
Rank	Rider	Team	Time
1	Marcel Kittel (GER)	Quick-Step Floors	4h 01' 00"
2	John Degenkolb (GER)	Trek–Segafredo	+ 0"
3	Dylan Groenewegen (NED)	LottoNL–Jumbo	+ 0"
4	Rüdiger Selig (GER)	Bora–Hansgrohe	+ 0"
5	Alexander Kristoff (NOR)	Team Katusha–Alpecin	+ 0"
6	Nacer Bouhanni (FRA)	Cofidis	+ 0"
7	Daniel McLay (GBR)	Fortuneo–Oscaro	+ 0"
8	Pieter Vanspeybrouck (BEL)	Wanty–Groupe Gobert	+ 0"
9	Sonny Colbrelli (ITA)	Bahrain–Merida	+ 0"
10	Edvald Boasson Hagen (NOR)	Team Dimension Data	+ 0"

General classification after Stage 10
Rank	Rider	Team	Time
1	Chris Froome (GBR)	Team Sky	42h 27' 28"
2	Fabio Aru (ITA)	Astana	+ 18"
3	Romain Bardet (FRA)	AG2R La Mondiale	+ 51"
4	Rigoberto Urán (COL)	Cannondale–Drapac	+ 55"
5	Jakob Fuglsang (DEN)	Astana	+ 1' 37"
6	Dan Martin (IRL)	Quick-Step Floors	+ 1' 44"
7	Simon Yates (GBR)	Orica–Scott	+ 2' 02"
8	Nairo Quintana (COL)	Movistar Team	+ 2' 13"
9	Mikel Landa (ESP)	Team Sky	+ 3' 06"
10	George Bennett (NZL)	LottoNL–Jumbo	+ 3' 53"

== Stage 11 ==
12 July 2017 — Eymet to Pau, 203.5 km (126 mi)

This flat stage departed south-west from Eymet, heading through Seyches and Marmande. The peloton continued through Casteljaloux and Houeillès to Labastide-d'Armagnac, and then turned south-east for Monclar where the riders continued south-west. An intermediate sprint took place at Aire-sur-l'Adour, prior to the riders going over the category 4 climb of the Côte d’Aire-sur-l'Adour. The riders turned south for Garlin and continued to Saint-Laurent-Bretagne. The race then turned south-west for Morlaàs and headed to the finish line in Pau.

Stage 11 result
Rank	Rider	Team	Time
1	Marcel Kittel (GER)	Quick-Step Floors	4h 34' 27"
2	Dylan Groenewegen (NED)	LottoNL–Jumbo	+ 0"
3	Edvald Boasson Hagen (NOR)	Team Dimension Data	+ 0"
4	Michael Matthews (AUS)	Team Sunweb	+ 0"
5	Daniel McLay (GBR)	Fortuneo–Oscaro	+ 0"
6	Davide Cimolai (ITA)	FDJ	+ 0"
7	André Greipel (GER)	Lotto–Soudal	+ 0"
8	Nacer Bouhanni (FRA)	Cofidis	+ 0"
9	Ben Swift (GBR)	UAE Team Emirates	+ 0"
10	Danilo Wyss (SUI)	BMC Racing Team	+ 0"

General classification after Stage 11
Rank	Rider	Team	Time
1	Chris Froome (GBR)	Team Sky	47h 01' 55"
2	Fabio Aru (ITA)	Astana	+ 18"
3	Romain Bardet (FRA)	AG2R La Mondiale	+ 51"
4	Rigoberto Urán (COL)	Cannondale–Drapac	+ 55"
5	Jakob Fuglsang (DEN)	Astana	+ 1' 37"
6	Dan Martin (IRL)	Quick-Step Floors	+ 1' 44"
7	Simon Yates (GBR)	Orica–Scott	+ 2' 02"
8	Nairo Quintana (COL)	Movistar Team	+ 2' 13"
9	Mikel Landa (ESP)	Team Sky	+ 3' 06"
10	George Bennett (NZL)	LottoNL–Jumbo	+ 3' 53"
