= 2018 Bora–Hansgrohe season =

Bora–Hansgrohe
- 2018 season
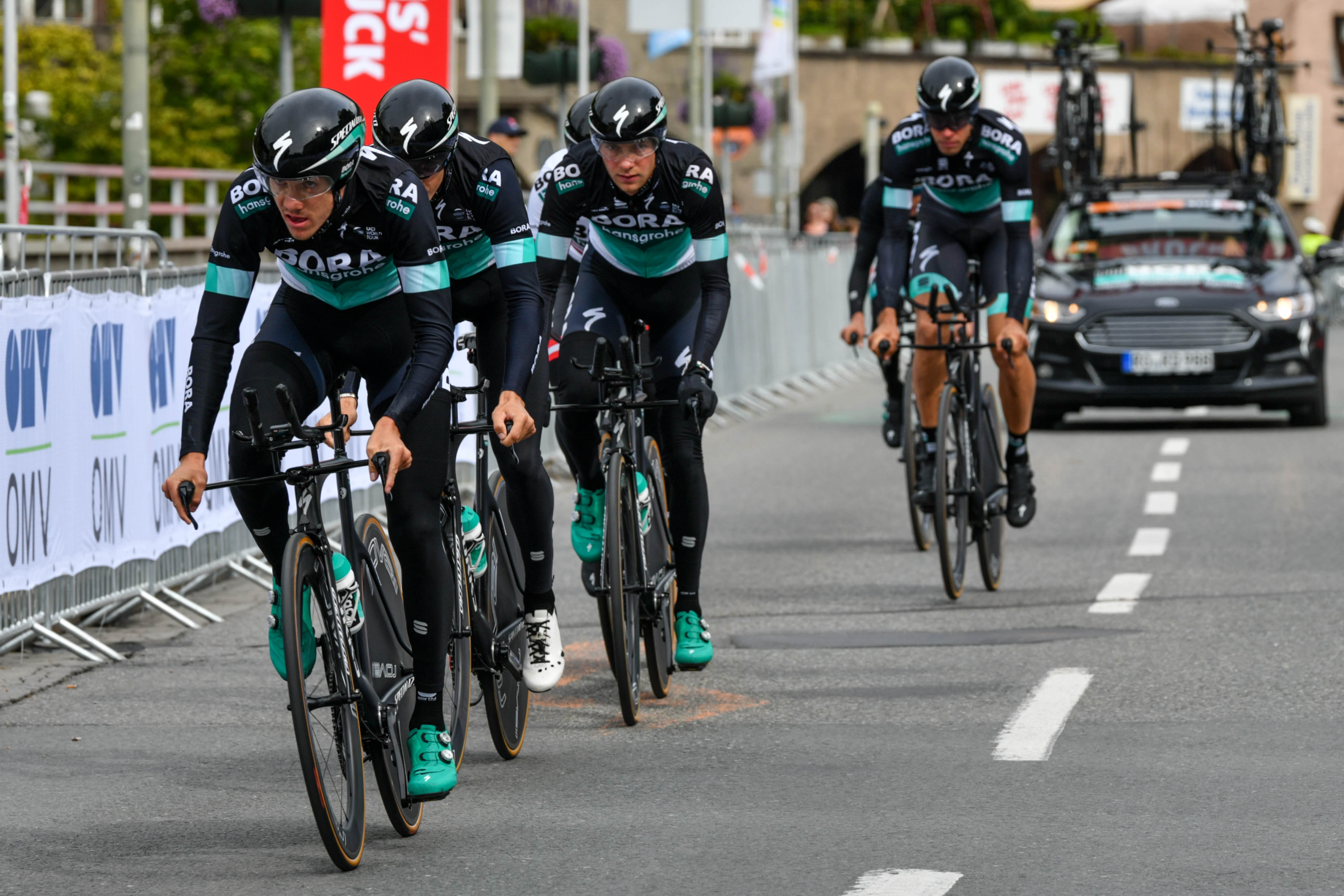
- UCI Road World Championships in Innsbruck
- UCI code: BOH
- Status: UCI WorldTeam
- Manager: Ralph Denk
- Main sponsor(s): BORA & Hansgrohe
- Based: Germany
- Bicycles: Specialized

Season victories
- One-day races: 6
- Stage race stages: 13
- National Championships: 4
- Most wins: Pascal Ackermann (9)
- Best ranked rider: Peter Sagan (4th)
- Jersey

The 2018 season for the Bora–Hansgrohe cycling team began in January.

== 2018 roster ==
As of 8 March 2018.

Rider	Date of birth
Pascal Ackermann (GER)	17 January 1994 (aged 24)
Erik Baška (SVK)	12 January 1994 (aged 24)
Cesare Benedetti (ITA)	3 August 1987 (aged 30)
Sam Bennett (IRL)	16 October 1990 (aged 27)
Maciej Bodnar (POL)	7 March 1985 (aged 33)
Emanuel Buchmann (GER)	18 November 1992 (aged 25)
Marcus Burghardt (GER)	30 June 1983 (aged 34)
Davide Formolo (ITA)	25 October 1992 (aged 25)
Felix Großschartner (AUT)	23 December 1993 (aged 24)
Peter Kennaugh (GBR)	15 June 1989 (aged 28)
Michael Kolář (SVK)	21 December 1992 (aged 25)
Leopold König (CZE)	15 November 1987 (aged 30)
Patrick Konrad (AUT)	13 October 1991 (aged 26)
Rafał Majka (POL)	12 September 1989 (aged 28)

Rider	Date of birth
Jay McCarthy (AUS)	8 September 1992 (aged 25)
Gregor Mühlberger (AUT)	4 April 1994 (aged 23)
Daniel Oss (ITA)	13 January 1987 (aged 31)
Matteo Pelucchi (ITA)	21 January 1989 (aged 29)
Christoph Pfingsten (GER)	20 November 1987 (aged 30)
Paweł Poljański (POL)	6 May 1990 (aged 27)
Lukas Pöstlberger (AUT)	10 January 1992 (aged 26)
Juraj Sagan (SVK)	23 December 1988 (aged 29)
Peter Sagan (SVK)	26 January 1990 (aged 28)
Aleksejs Saramotins (LAT)	8 April 1982 (aged 35)
Andreas Schillinger (GER)	13 July 1983 (aged 34)
Michael Schwarzmann (GER)	7 January 1991 (aged 27)
Rüdiger Selig (GER)	19 February 1989 (aged 29)

Riders who joined the team for the 2018 season

Rider	2017 team
Davide Formolo	Cannondale–Drapac
Felix Grossschartner	CCC–Sprandi–Polkowice
Peter Kennaugh	Team Sky
Daniel Oss	BMC Racing Team

Riders who left the team during or after the 2017 season

Rider	2018 team
Shane Archbold	Aqua Blue Sport
Jan Bárta	Elkov–Author
Silvio Herklotz	Burgos BH
José Mendes	Burgos BH

== Season victories ==
Date	Race	Competition	Rider	Country	Location
19 January	Tour Down Under, Stage 4	UCI World Tour	Peter Sagan (SVK)	Australia	Uraidla
28 January	Cadel Evans Great Ocean Road Race	UCI World Tour	Jay McCarthy (AUS)	Australia	Geelong
25 March	Gent–Wevelgem	UCI World Tour	Peter Sagan (SVK)	Belgium	Wevelgem
4 April	Tour of the Basque Country, Stage 3	UCI World Tour	Jay McCarthy (AUS)	Spain	Villanueva de Valdegovía
8 April	Paris–Roubaix	UCI World Tour	Peter Sagan (SVK)	France	Roubaix
29 April	Tour de Romandie, Stage 5	UCI World Tour	Pascal Ackermann (GER)	Switzerland	Geneva
11 May	Giro d'Italia, Stage 7	UCI World Tour	Sam Bennett (IRL)	Italy	Praia a Mare
17 May	Giro d'Italia, Stage 12	UCI World Tour	Sam Bennett (IRL)	Italy	Imola
27 May	Giro d'Italia, Stage 21	UCI World Tour	Sam Bennett (IRL)	Italy	Rome
5 June	Critérium du Dauphiné, Stage 2	UCI World Tour	Pascal Ackermann (GER)	France	Belleville
10 June	Rund um Köln	UCI Europe Tour	Sam Bennett (IRL)	Germany	Cologne
10 June	Tour de Suisse, Stage 2	UCI World Tour	Peter Sagan (SVK)	Switzerland	Frauenfeld
8 July	Tour de France, Stage 2	UCI World Tour	Peter Sagan (SVK)	France	La Roche-sur-Yon
11 July	Tour de France, Stage 5	UCI World Tour	Peter Sagan (SVK)	France	Quimper
20 July	Tour de France, Stage 13	UCI World Tour	Peter Sagan (SVK)	France	Valence
26 July	Grand Prix Pino Cerami	UCI Europe Tour	Peter Kennaugh (GBR)	Belgium	Frameries
29 July	Tour de France, Points classification	UCI World Tour	Peter Sagan (SVK)	France	
29 July	RideLondon-Surrey Classic	UCI World Tour	Pascal Ackermann (GER)	United Kingdom	London
4 August	Tour de Pologne, Stage 1	UCI World Tour	Pascal Ackermann (GER)	Poland	Kraków
5 August	Tour de Pologne, Stage 2	UCI World Tour	Pascal Ackermann (GER)	Poland	Katowice
10 August	Tour de Pologne, Mountains classification	UCI World Tour	Patrick Konrad (AUT)	Poland	
14 September	Okolo Slovenska, Stage 2	UCI Europe Tour	Rüdiger Selig (GER)	Slovakia	Dubnica nad Váhom
15 September	Okolo Slovenska, Stage 3	UCI Europe Tour	Matteo Pelucchi (GER)	Slovakia	Nitra

== National, Continental and World champions 2018 ==
Date	Discipline	Jersey	Rider	Country	Location
22 June	Polish National Time Trial Champion		Maciej Bodnar (POL)	Poland	Grunwald
24 June	Slovak National Road Race Champion		Peter Sagan (SVK)	Czech Republic	Plzeň
1 July	Austrian National Road Race Champion		Lukas Pöstlberger (AUT)	Austria	Vienna
1 July	German National Road Race Champion		Pascal Ackermann (GER)	Germany	Einhausen
