= 2018 Groupama–FDJ season =

Groupama-FDJ
- 2018 season
- UCI code: GFC
- Status: UCI WorldTeam
- Manager: Marc Madiot
- Main sponsor(s): Française des Jeux
- Based: France
- Bicycles: Lapierre
- Groupset: Shimano

Season victories
- One-day races: 5
- Stage race overall: 3
- Stage race stages: 20
- National Championships: 5

The 2018 season for Groupama–FDJ began in January at the Tour Down Under. As a UCI WorldTeam, they were automatically invited and obligated to send a squad to every event in the UCI World Tour.

== Team roster ==
As of 5 August 2018.

Rider	Date of birth
Bruno Armirail (FRA)	11 April 1994 (aged 23)
William Bonnet (FRA)	25 June 1982 (aged 35)
Davide Cimolai (ITA)	13 August 1989 (aged 28)
Mickaël Delage (FRA)	6 August 1985 (aged 32)
Arnaud Démare (FRA)	26 August 1991 (aged 26)
Antoine Duchesne (CAN)	12 September 1991 (aged 26)
David Gaudu (FRA)	10 October 1996 (aged 21)
Jacopo Guarnieri (ITA)	14 August 1987 (aged 30)
Daniel Hoelgaard (NOR)	1 July 1993 (aged 24)
Ignatas Konovalovas (LTU)	8 December 1985 (aged 32)
Mathieu Ladagnous (FRA)	12 December 1984 (aged 33)
Olivier Le Gac (FRA)	27 August 1993 (aged 24)
Tobias Ludvigsson (SWE)	22 February 1991 (aged 26)
Valentin Madouas (FRA)	12 July 1996 (aged 21)

Rider	Date of birth
Rudy Molard (FRA)	17 September 1989 (aged 28)
Steve Morabito (SUI)	30 January 1983 (aged 34)
Thibaut Pinot (FRA)	29 May 1990 (aged 27)
Georg Preidler (AUT)	17 June 1990 (aged 27)
Sébastien Reichenbach (SUI)	28 May 1989 (aged 28)
Anthony Roux (FRA)	18 April 1987 (aged 30)
Jérémy Roy (FRA)	22 June 1983 (aged 34)
Marc Sarreau (FRA)	10 June 1993 (aged 24)
Romain Seigle (FRA)	11 October 1994 (aged 23)
Ramon Sinkeldam (NED)	9 February 1989 (aged 28)
Benjamin Thomas (FRA)	12 September 1995 (aged 22)
Benoît Vaugrenard (FRA)	5 January 1982 (aged 35)
Arthur Vichot (FRA)	26 November 1988 (aged 29)
Léo Vincent (FRA)	6 November 1995 (aged 22)

Riders who joined the team for the 2018 season

Rider	2017 team
Bruno Armirail	Armée de Terre
Antoine Duchesne	Direct Énergie
Valentin Madouas	
Georg Preidler	Team Sunweb
Romain Seigle	
Benjamin Thomas	Armée de Terre

Riders who left the team during or after the 2017 season

Rider	2018 team
Arnaud Courteille	Vital Concept
Odd Christian Eiking	Wanty–Groupe Gobert
Marc Fournier	Vital Concept
Johan Le Bon	Vital Concept
Jérémy Maison	Fortuneo–Samsic
Lorrenzo Manzin	Vital Concept
Cédric Pineau	Retired
Kévin Reza	Vital Concept

== Season victories ==
Date	Race	Competition	Rider	Country	Location
31 January	Étoile de Bessèges, Stage 1	UCI Europe Tour	Marc Sarreau (FRA)	France	Beaucaire
2 February	Étoile de Bessèges, Stage 3	UCI Europe Tour	Marc Sarreau (FRA)	France	Bessèges
4 March	Paris–Nice, Stage 1	UCI World Tour	Arnaud Démare (FRA)	France	Meudon
9 March	Paris–Nice, Stage 6	UCI World Tour	Rudy Molard (FRA)	France	Vence
1 April	La Roue Tourangelle	UCI Europe Tour	Marc Sarreau (FRA)	France	Tours
4 April	Circuit de la Sarthe, Stage 2	UCI Europe Tour	Marc Sarreau (FRA)	France	Ancenis
20 April	Tour of the Alps, Overall classification	UCI Europe Tour	Thibaut Pinot (FRA)	Italy	
8 May	Four Days of Dunkirk, Stage 1	UCI Europe Tour	Marc Sarreau (FRA)	France	La Bassée
13 May	Four Days of Dunkirk, Stage 6	UCI Europe Tour	Olivier Le Gac (FRA)	France	Dunkirk
20 May	Tour de l'Ain, Stage 3	UCI Europe Tour	Arthur Vichot (FRA)	France	Col de la Faucille
20 May	Tour de l'Ain, Overall classification	UCI Europe Tour	Arthur Vichot (FRA)	France	
16 June	Tour de Suisse, Stage 8	UCI World Tour	Arnaud Démare (FRA)	Switzerland	Bellinzona
17 June	Route d'Occitanie, Stage 4	UCI Europe Tour	Anthony Roux (FRA)	France	Cazouls-lès-Béziers
24 June	Paris-Chauny	UCI Europe Tour	Ramon Sinkeldam (NED)	France	Chauny
26 July	Tour de France, Stage 18	UCI World Tour	Arnaud Démare (FRA)	France	Pau
9 August	Tour de Pologne, Stage 6	UCI World Tour	Georg Preidler (AUT)	Poland	Bukovina Resort
15 August	Tour du Limousin, Stage 1	UCI Europe Tour	Anthony Roux (FRA)	France	Bonnat
21 August	Tour Poitou-Charentes en Nouvelle-Aquitaine, Stage 1	UCI Europe Tour	Arnaud Démare (FRA)	France	Cognac
22 August	Tour Poitou-Charentes en Nouvelle-Aquitaine, Stage 2	UCI Europe Tour	Arnaud Démare (FRA)	France	Melle
23 August	Tour Poitou-Charentes en Nouvelle-Aquitaine, Stage 3	UCI Europe Tour	Arnaud Démare (FRA)	France	Couhé
23 August	Tour Poitou-Charentes en Nouvelle-Aquitaine, Stage 4, ITT	UCI Europe Tour	Arnaud Démare (FRA)	France	Couhé
24 August	Tour Poitou-Charentes en Nouvelle-Aquitaine, Stage 5	UCI Europe Tour	Arnaud Démare (FRA)	France	Poitiers
24 August	Tour Poitou-Charentes en Nouvelle-Aquitaine, Overall classification	UCI Europe Tour	Arnaud Démare (FRA)	France	
9 September	Vuelta a España, Stage 15	UCI World Tour	Thibaut Pinot (FRA)	Spain	Lakes of Covadonga
14 September	Vuelta a España, Stage 19	UCI World Tour	Thibaut Pinot (FRA)	Andorra	Naturlandia
4 October	Paris–Bourges	UCI Europe Tour	Valentin Madouas (FRA)	France	
10 October	Milano–Torino	UCI Europe Tour	Thibaut Pinot (FRA)	Italy	
13 October	Il Lombardia	UCI World Tour	Thibaut Pinot (FRA)	Italy	

== National, Continental and World champions 2018 ==
Date	Discipline	Jersey	Rider	Country	Location
20 June	Swedish National Time Trial Champion		Tobias Ludvigsson (SWE)	Sweden	Torekov
22 June	Canadian National Road Race Champion		Antoine Duchesne (CAN)	Canada	Saguenay
29 June	Austrian National Time Trial Champion		Georg Preidler (AUT)	Austria	Stephanshart
1 July	Swiss National Road Race Champion		Steve Morabito (SUI)	Switzerland	Schneisingen
1 July	French National Road Race Champion		Anthony Roux (FRA)	France	Mantes-la-Jolie
