= 2018 UAE Team Emirates season =

UAE Team Emirates
- 2018 season
- UCI code: UAD
- Status: UCI WorldTeam
- Manager: Giuseppe Saronni
- Main sponsor(s): Emirates
- Based: United Arab Emirates
- Bicycles: Colnago
- Groupset: Shimano

Season victories
- One-day races: 2
- Stage race stages: 7
- National Championships: 3
- Jersey

The 2018 season for UAE Team Emirates began in January at the Tour Down Under. As a UCI WorldTeam, they were automatically invited and obligated to send a squad to every event in the UCI World Tour.

== Team roster ==
As of 4 March 2018.

Rider	Date of birth
Anass Aït El Abdia (MAR)	21 March 1993 (aged 24)
Fabio Aru (ITA)	3 July 1990 (aged 27)
Darwin Atapuma (COL)	15 January 1988 (aged 30)
Matteo Bono (ITA)	11 November 1983 (aged 34)
Sven Erik Bystrøm (NOR)	21 January 1992 (aged 26)
Simone Consonni (ITA)	12 September 1994 (aged 23)
Valerio Conti (ITA)	30 March 1993 (aged 24)
Rui Costa (POR)	5 October 1986 (aged 31)
Kristijan Đurasek (CRO)	26 July 1987 (aged 30)
Roberto Ferrari (ITA)	9 March 1983 (aged 34)
Filippo Ganna (ITA)	25 July 1996 (aged 21)
Alexander Kristoff (NOR)	5 July 1987 (aged 30)
Vegard Stake Laengen (NOR)	7 February 1989 (aged 29)

Rider	Date of birth
Marco Marcato (ITA)	11 February 1984 (aged 34)
Dan Martin (IRL)	20 August 1986 (aged 31)
Yousif Mirza (UAE)	8 October 1988 (aged 29)
Manuele Mori (ITA)	9 August 1980 (aged 37)
Przemysław Niemiec (POL)	11 April 1980 (aged 37)
Simone Petilli (ITA)	4 May 1993 (aged 24)
Jan Polanc (SLO)	6 May 1992 (aged 25)
Edward Ravasi (ITA)	5 June 1994 (aged 23)
Rory Sutherland (AUS)	8 February 1982 (aged 36)
Alexandr Riabushenko (BLR)	12 October 1995 (aged 22)
Ben Swift (GBR)	5 November 1987 (aged 30)
Oliviero Troia (ITA)	1 September 1994 (aged 23)
Diego Ulissi (ITA)	15 July 1989 (aged 28)

Riders who joined the team for the 2018 season

Rider	2017 team
Fabio Aru	Astana
Sven Erik Bystrom	Team Katusha–Alpecin
Alexander Kristoff	Team Katusha–Alpecin
Daniel Martin	Soudal–Quick-Step
Alexandr Riabushenko	neo–pro
Rory Sutherland	Movistar Team

Riders who left the team during or after the 2017 season

Rider	2018 team
Sacha Modolo	EF Education First–Drapac p/b Cannondale
Louis Meintjes	Team Dimension Data
Andrea Guardini	Bardiani-CSF
Matej Mohorič	Bahrain–Merida
Marko Kump	CCC–Sprandi–Polkowice
Federico Zurlo	Team MsTina–Focus

== Season victories ==
Date	Race	Competition	Rider	Country	Location
18 February	Tour of Oman, Stage 6	UCI Asia Tour	Alexander Kristoff (NOR)	Oman	Matrah Corniche
21 February	Abu Dhabi Tour, Stage 1	UCI World Tour	Alexander Kristoff (NOR)	United Arab Emirates	Madinat Zayed
1 May	Eschborn–Frankfurt	UCI World Tour	Alexander Kristoff (NOR)	Germany	Frankfurt
7 June	Grand Prix of Aargau Canton	UCI Europe Tour	Alexander Kristoff (NOR)	Switzerland	Leuggern
8 June	Critérium du Dauphiné, Stage 5	UCI World Tour	Daniel Martin (IRL)	France	Valmorel
13 June	Tour of Slovenia, Stage 1	UCI Europe Tour	Simone Consonni (ITA)	Slovenia	Murska Sobota
13 June	Tour de Suisse, Stage 5	UCI World Tour	Diego Ulissi (ITA)	Switzerland	Leukerbad
13 July	Tour de France, Stage 6	UCI World Tour	Daniel Martin (IRL)	France	Mûr-de-Bretagne
29 July	Tour de France, Stage 21	UCI World Tour	Alexander Kristoff (NOR)	France	Paris Champs-Élysées

== National, Continental and World champions 2018 ==
Date	Race	Jersey	Rider	Country	Location
24 March	United Arab Emirates National Road Race Champion		Yousif Mirza (UAE)	United Arab Emirates	
31 March	United Arab Emirates National Time Trial Champion		Yousif Mirza (UAE)	United Arab Emirates	
24 June	Norwegian National Road Race Champion		Vegard Stake Laengen (NOR)	Norway	Sandefjord
