= 2018 Lotto–Soudal season =

Lotto-Soudal
- 2018 season
- UCI code: LTS
- Status: UCI WorldTeam
- Manager: Marc Sergeant
- Main sponsor(s): Soudal
- Based: Belgium
- Bicycles: Ridley
- Groupset: Campagnolo

Season victories
- One-day races: 3
- Stage race overall: 3
- Stage race stages: 18
- National Championships: 1

The 2018 season for the Lotto–Soudal cycling team began in January at the Tour Down Under. As a UCI WorldTeam, they were automatically invited and obligated to send a squad to every event in the UCI World Tour.

== Team roster ==
As of 13 October 2018.

| Rider | Date of birth |
|---|---|
| Sander Armée (BEL) | 10 December 1985 (aged 32) |
| Lars Bak (DEN) | 16 January 1980 (aged 37) |
| Tiesj Benoot (BEL) | 11 March 1994 (aged 23) |
| Victor Campenaerts (BEL) | 28 October 1991 (aged 26) |
| Jasper De Buyst (BEL) | 24 November 1993 (aged 24) |
| Thomas De Gendt (BEL) | 6 November 1986 (aged 31) |
| Jens Debusschere (BEL) | 28 August 1989 (aged 28) |
| Stan Dewulf (BEL) | 20 December 1997 (aged 20) |
| Frederik Frison (BEL) | 28 July 1992 (aged 25) |
| André Greipel (GER) | 16 July 1982 (aged 35) |
| Adam Hansen (AUS) | 11 May 1981 (aged 36) |
| Moreno Hofland (NED) | 31 August 1991 (aged 26) |
| Jens Keukeleire (BEL) | 23 November 1988 (aged 29) |
| Bjorg Lambrecht (BEL) | 2 April 1997 (aged 20) |
| Nikolas Maes (BEL) | 9 April 1986 (aged 31) |

| Rider | Date of birth |
|---|---|
| Tomasz Marczyński (POL) | 6 March 1984 (aged 33) |
| Rémy Mertz (BEL) | 17 July 1995 (aged 22) |
| Maxime Monfort (BEL) | 14 January 1983 (aged 34) |
| Lawrence Naesen (BEL) | 28 August 1992 (aged 25) |
| James Shaw (GBR) | 6 June 1996 (aged 21) |
| Marcel Sieberg (GER) | 30 April 1982 (aged 35) |
| Gerben Thijssen (BEL) | 21 June 1998 (aged 19) |
| Tosh Van der Sande (BEL) | 28 November 1990 (aged 27) |
| Brent Van Moer (BEL) | 12 January 1998 (aged 19) |
| Jelle Vanendert (BEL) | 19 February 1985 (aged 32) |
| Harm Vanhoucke (BEL) | 17 June 1997 (aged 20) |
| Jelle Wallays (BEL) | 11 May 1989 (aged 28) |
| Tim Wellens (BEL) | 10 May 1991 (aged 26) |
| Enzo Wouters (BEL) | 21 March 1996 (aged 21) |

Riders who joined the team for the 2018 season

| Rider | 2017 team |
|---|---|
| Victor Campenaerts | LottoNL–Jumbo |
| Jens Keukeleire | Orica–Scott |
| Bjorg Lambrecht | neo-pro (Lotto–Soudal U23) |
| Stan Dewulf | neo-pro (Lotto–Soudal U23) |
| Lawrence Naesen | WB Veranclassic Aqua Protect |
| Gerben Thijssen | neo-pro (Lotto–Soudal U23) |
| Brent Van Moer | neo-pro (Lotto–Soudal U23) |
| Harm Vanhoucke | neo-pro (Lotto–Soudal U23) |

Riders who left the team during or after the 2017 season

| Rider | 2018 team |
|---|---|
| Kris Boeckmans | Vital Concept |
| Sean De Bie | Vérandas Willems–Crelan |
| Bart De Clercq | Wanty–Groupe Gobert |
| Tony Gallopin | AG2R La Mondiale |
| Jürgen Roelandts | BMC Racing Team |
| Rafael Valls | Movistar Team |
| Louis Vervaeke | Team Sunweb |

== Season victories ==
| Date | Race | Competition | Rider | Country | Location |
|---|---|---|---|---|---|
| 16 January | Tour Down Under, Stage 1 | UCI World Tour | André Greipel (GER) | Australia | Lyndoch |
| 21 January | Tour Down Under, Stage 6 | UCI World Tour | André Greipel (GER) | Australia | Adelaide |
| 26 January | Trofeo Serra de Tramuntana | UCI Europe Tour | Tim Wellens (BEL) | Spain | Deià |
| 27 January | Vuelta a San Juan, Stage 6 | UCI America Tour | Jelle Wallays (BEL) | Argentina | San Juan |
| 17 February | Vuelta a Andalucía, Stage 4 | UCI Europe Tour | Tim Wellens (BEL) | Spain | Alcalá de los Gazules |
| 18 February | Vuelta a Andalucía, Overall classification | UCI Europe Tour | Tim Wellens (BEL) | Spain | |
| 3 March | Strade Bianche | UCI World Tour | Tim Wellens (BEL) | Italy | Siena |
| 21 March | Volta a Catalunya, Stage 3 | UCI World Tour | Thomas De Gendt (BEL) | Spain | Camprodon |
| 11 April | Brabantse Pijl | UCI Europe Tour | Tim Wellens (BEL) | Belgium | Overijse |
| 26 April | Tour de Romandie, Stage 2 | UCI World Tour | Thomas De Gendt (BEL) | Switzerland | Yverdon-les-Bains |
| 8 May | Giro d'Italia, Stage 4 | UCI World Tour | Tim Wellens (BEL) | Italy | Caltagirone |
| 9 May | Four Days of Dunkirk, Stage 2 | UCI Europe Tour | André Greipel (GER) | France | Soissons |
| 12 May | Four Days of Dunkirk, Stage 5 | UCI Europe Tour | André Greipel (GER) | France | Cassel |
| 23 May | Baloise Belgium Tour, Stage 1 | UCI Europe Tour | André Greipel (GER) | Belgium | Buggenhout |
| 24 May | Baloise Belgium Tour, Stage 2 | UCI Europe Tour | André Greipel (GER) | Belgium | Knokke-Heist |
| 24 May | Tour des Fjords, Stage 3 | UCI Europe Tour | Bjorg Lambrecht (BEL) | Norway | Egersund |
| 26 May | Baloise Belgium Tour, Stage 4 | UCI Europe Tour | Jelle Vanendert (BEL) | Belgium | Wanze |
| 27 May | Baloise Belgium Tour, Overall classification | UCI Europe Tour | Jens Keukeleire (BEL) | Belgium | |
| 29 July | Tour de Wallonie, Stage 2 | UCI Europe Tour | Tim Wellens (BEL) | Belgium | Namur |
| 1 August | Tour de Wallonie, Stage 5 | UCI Europe Tour | Jens Keukeleire (BEL) | Belgium | Waremme |
| 1 August | Tour de Wallonie, Overall classification | UCI Europe Tour | Tim Wellens (BEL) | Belgium | |
| 2 September | Tour of Britain, Stage 1 | UCI Europe Tour | André Greipel (GER) | United Kingdom | Newport |
| 5 September | Tour of Britain, Stage 4 | UCI Europe Tour | André Greipel (GER) | United Kingdom | Royal Leamington Spa |
| 13 September | Vuelta a España, Stage 18 | UCI World Tour | Jelle Wallays (BEL) | Spain | Lleida |

== National, Continental and World champions 2018 ==
| Date | Discipline | Jersey | Rider | Country | Location |
|---|---|---|---|---|---|
| 21 June | Belgian National Time Trial Champion | | Victor Campenaerts (BEL) | Belgium | Anzegem |
| 8 August | European Time Trial Champion | | Victor Campenaerts (BEL) | United Kingdom | Glasgow |
