= 2018 AG2R La Mondiale season =

AG2R La Mondiale
- 2018 season
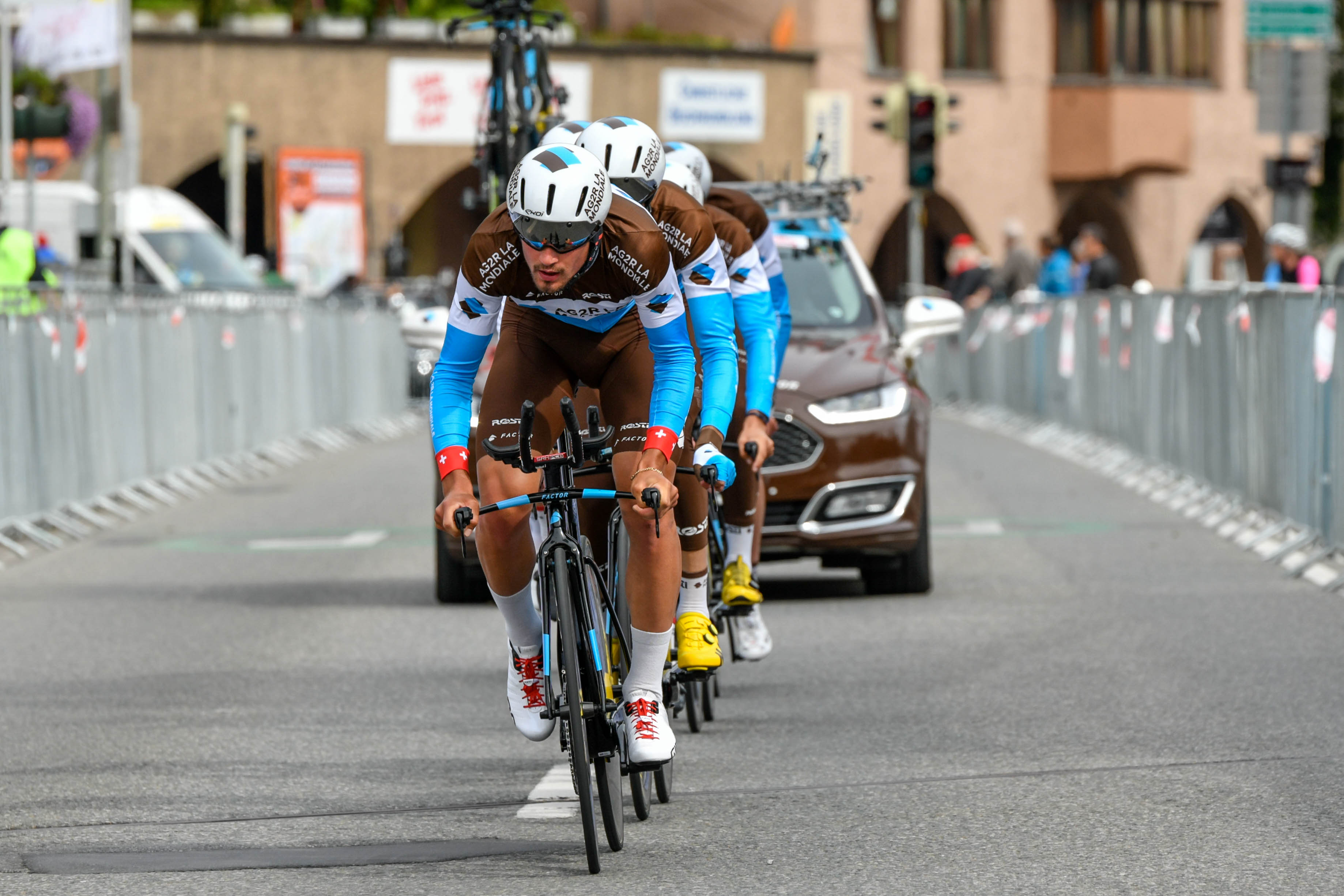
- Team AG2R La Mondiale on UCI Road World Championships in Innsbruck
- UCI code: ALM
- Status: UCI WorldTeam
- Manager: Vincent Lavenu
- Main sponsor(s): AG2R Group & La Mondiale Group
- Based: France
- Bicycles: Focus Bikes
- Groupset: SRAM

Season victories
- One-day races: 5
- Stage race overall: 2
- Stage race stages: 5
- National Championships: 3

The 2018 season for the AG2R La Mondiale cycling team will begin in January at the Tour Down Under. As a UCI WorldTeam, they will be automatically invited and obligated to send a squad to every event in the UCI World Tour.

== Team roster ==
As of 9 December 2017.

Rider	Date of birth
Gediminas Bagdonas (LTU)	26 December 1985 (aged 32)
Jan Bakelants (BEL)	14 February 1986 (aged 31)
Rudy Barbier (FRA)	18 December 1992 (aged 25)
Romain Bardet (FRA)	9 November 1990 (aged 27)
François Bidard (FRA)	12 March 1992 (aged 25)
Mikaël Cherel (FRA)	17 March 1986 (aged 31)
Clément Chevrier (FRA)	29 June 1992 (aged 25)
Benoît Cosnefroy (FRA)	17 October 1995 (aged 22)
Nico Denz (GER)	15 February 1994 (aged 23)
Silvan Dillier (SUI)	3 August 1990 (aged 27)
Axel Domont (FRA)	7 August 1990 (aged 27)
Samuel Dumoulin (FRA)	20 August 1980 (aged 37)
Hubert Dupont (FRA)	13 November 1980 (aged 37)
Julien Duval (FRA)	27 May 1990 (aged 27)

Rider	Date of birth
Mathias Frank (SUI)	9 December 1986 (aged 31)
Tony Gallopin (FRA)	24 May 1988 (aged 29)
Ben Gastauer (LUX)	14 November 1987 (aged 30)
Cyril Gautier (FRA)	26 September 1987 (aged 30)
Alexandre Geniez (FRA)	16 April 1988 (aged 29)
Alexis Gougeard (FRA)	5 March 1993 (aged 24)
Quentin Jaurégui (FRA)	22 April 1994 (aged 23)
Pierre Latour (FRA)	12 October 1993 (aged 24)
Matteo Montaguti (ITA)	6 January 1984 (aged 33)
Oliver Naesen (BEL)	16 September 1990 (aged 27)
Nans Peters (FRA)	12 March 1994 (aged 23)
Stijn Vandenbergh (BEL)	25 April 1984 (aged 33)
Clément Venturini (FRA)	16 October 1993 (aged 24)
Alexis Vuillermoz (FRA)	1 June 1988 (aged 29)

Riders who joined the team for the 2018 season

Rider	2017 team
Silvan Dillier	BMC Racing Team
Clément Venturini	Cofidis
Tony Gallopin	Lotto–Soudal

Riders who left the team during or after the 2017 season

Rider	2018 team
Julien Bérard	Retires
Sondre Holst Enger	Israel Cycling Academy
Hugo Houle	Astana
Domenico Pozzovivo	Bahrain–Merida
Christophe Riblon	Retires

== Season victories ==
Date	Race	Competition	Rider	Country	Location
28 January	Grand Prix d'Ouverture La Marseillaise	UCI Europe Tour	Alexandre Geniez (FRA)	France	Marseille
4 February	Étoile de Bessèges, Stage 5, ITT	UCI Europe Tour	Tony Gallopin (FRA)	France	Alès
4 February	Étoile de Bessèges, Overall	UCI Europe Tour	Tony Gallopin (FRA)	France	
8 February	Tour La Provence, Prologue	UCI Europe Tour	Alexandre Geniez (FRA)	France	Castellet
11 February	Tour La Provence, Overall	UCI Europe Tour	Alexandre Geniez (FRA)	France	
24 February	Classic Sud-Ardèche	UCI Europe Tour	Romain Bardet (FRA)	France	
30 March	Route Adélie	UCI Europe Tour	Silvan Dillier (SUI)	France	Vitré
15 June	Route d'Occitanie, Stage 2	UCI Europe Tour	Clément Venturini (FRA)	France	Masseube Val-de-Gers
26 August	Bretagne Classic Ouest–France	UCI World Tour	Oliver Naesen (BEL)	France	
31 August	Vuelta a España, Stage 7	UCI World Tour	Tony Gallopin (FRA)	Spain	Pozo Alcón
6 September	Vuelta a España, Stage 12	UCI World Tour	Alexandre Geniez (FRA)	Spain	Punta de Estaca de Bares
6 October	Tour de Vendée	UCI Europe Tour	Nico Denz (GER)	France	

== National, Continental and World champions 2018 ==
Date	Discipline	Jersey	Rider	Country	Location
22 June	Lithuanian National Time Trial Champion		Gediminas Bagdonas (LTU)	Lithuania	Gargždai
24 June	Lithuanian National Road Race Champion		Gediminas Bagdonas (LTU)	Lithuania	Gargždai
28 June	French National Time Trial Champion		Pierre Latour (FRA)	France	Mantes-la-Jolie
