= 2018 Dimension Data season =

Dimension Data
- 2018 season
- UCI code: DDD
- Status: UCI WorldTeam
- Manager: Brian Smith
- Main sponsor(s): Dimension Data
- Based: South Africa
- Bicycles: Cervélo

Season victories
- Stage race stages: 5
- National Championships: 2

The 2018 season for the Team Dimension Data cycling team began in January at the Tour Down Under. As a UCI WorldTeam, they were automatically invited and obligated to send a squad to every event in the UCI World Tour.

== Team roster ==
As of 24 March 2018

Rider	Date of birth
Igor Antón (ESP)	2 March 1983 (aged 35)
Natnael Berhane (ERI)	5 January 1991 (aged 27)
Edvald Boasson Hagen (NOR)	17 May 1987 (aged 30)
Mark Cavendish (GBR)	21 May 1985 (aged 32)
Steve Cummings (GBR)	19 March 1981 (aged 37)
Scott Davies (GBR)	5 August 1995 (aged 22)
Mekseb Debesay (ERI)	16 June 1991 (aged 26)
Nicholas Dlamini (RSA)	12 August 1995 (aged 22)
Nicolas Dougall (RSA)	21 November 1992 (aged 25)
Bernhard Eisel (AUT)	17 February 1981 (aged 37)
Amanuel Gebrezgabihier (ERI)	17 August 1994 (aged 23)
Ryan Gibbons (RSA)	13 August 1994 (aged 23)
Jacques Janse van Rensburg (RSA)	6 September 1987 (aged 30)
Reinardt Janse van Rensburg (RSA)	3 February 1989 (aged 29)

Rider	Date of birth
Ben King (USA)	22 March 1989 (aged 29)
Merhawi Kudus (ERI)	23 January 1994 (aged 24)
Louis Meintjes (RSA)	21 February 1992 (aged 26)
Lachlan Morton (AUS)	2 January 1992 (aged 26)
Ben O'Connor (AUS)	25 November 1995 (aged 22)
Serge Pauwels (BEL)	21 November 1983 (aged 34)
Mark Renshaw (AUS)	22 October 1982 (aged 35)
Tom-Jelte Slagter (NED)	1 July 1989 (aged 28)
Jay Thomson (RSA)	12 April 1986 (aged 31)
Scott Thwaites (GBR)	12 February 1990 (aged 28)
Johann van Zyl (RSA)	2 February 1991 (aged 27)
Jaco Venter (RSA)	13 February 1987 (aged 31)
Julien Vermote (BEL)	26 July 1989 (aged 28)

Riders who joined the team for the 2018 season

Rider	2017 team
Scott Davies	WIGGINS
Nicholas Dlamini	Dimension Data for Qhubeka
Amanuel Gebreigzabhier	Dimension Data for Qhubeka
Louis Meintjes	UAE Team Emirates
Tom-Jelte Slagter	Cannondale–Drapac
Julien Vermote	Quick-Step Floors

Riders who left the team during or after the 2017 season

Rider	2018 team
Tyler Farrar	Retired
Omar Fraile	Astana
Nathan Haas	Team Katusha–Alpecin
Adrien Niyonshuti	
Youcef Reguigui	Sovac–Natura4Ever
Kristian Sbaragli	Israel Cycling Academy
Daniel Teklehaimanot	Cofidis

== Season victories ==
Date	Race	Competition	Rider	Country	Location
8 February	Dubai Tour, Stage 3	UCI Asia Tour	Mark Cavendish (GBR)	United Arab Emirates	Fujairah
18 April	Tour of the Alps, Stage 3	UCI Europe Tour	Ben O'Connor (AUS)	Italy	Merano
17 May	Tour of Norway, Stage 2	UCI Europe Tour	Edvald Boasson Hagen (NOR)	Norway	Asker
28 August	Vuelta a España, Stage 4	UCI World Tour	Ben King (USA)	Spain	Alfacar
2 September	Vuelta a España, Stage 9	UCI World Tour	Ben King (USA)	Spain	La Covatilla

== National, Continental and World champions 2018 ==
Date	Discipline	Jersey	Rider	Country	Location
21 June	Norwegian National Time Trial Champion		Edvald Boasson Hagen (NOR)	Norway	Sandefjord
24 June	Eritrean National Road Race Champion		Merhawi Kudus (ERI)	Eritrea	
