= 2018 BMC Racing Team season =

BMC Racing Team
- 2018 season
- UCI code: BMC
- Status: UCI WorldTeam
- Manager: Jim Ochowicz
- Main sponsor(s): BMC Switzerland
- Based: United States
- Bicycles: BMC
- Groupset: Shimano

Season victories
- One-day races: 1
- Stage race overall: 2
- Stage race stages: 16
- World Championships: 1
- National Championships: 3

The 2018 season for the BMC Racing Team began in January with the Tour Down Under. As a UCI WorldTeam, they were automatically invited and obligated to send a squad to every event in the UCI World Tour.

== Team roster ==
As of March 25, 2018.

Rider	Date of birth
Alberto Bettiol (ITA)	October 29, 1993 (aged 24)
Patrick Bevin (NZL)	February 15, 1991 (aged 27)
Tom Bohli (SUI)	January 17, 1994 (aged 24)
Brent Bookwalter (USA)	February 16, 1984 (aged 34)
Damiano Caruso (ITA)	October 12, 1987 (aged 30)
Alessandro De Marchi (ITA)	May 19, 1986 (aged 31)
Rohan Dennis (AUS)	May 28, 1990 (aged 27)
Jempy Drucker (LUX)	September 3, 1986 (aged 31)
Kilian Frankiny (SUI)	January 26, 1994 (aged 24)
Simon Gerrans (AUS)	May 16, 1980 (aged 37)
Stefan Küng (SUI)	November 16, 1993 (aged 24)
Richie Porte (AUS)	January 30, 1985 (aged 33)

Rider	Date of birth
Nicolas Roche (IRL)	July 3, 1984 (aged 33)
Jürgen Roelandts (BEL)	July 2, 1985 (aged 32)
Joey Rosskopf (USA)	September 5, 1989 (aged 28)
Michael Schär (SUI)	September 29, 1986 (aged 31)
Miles Scotson (AUS)	January 18, 1994 (aged 24)
Dylan Teuns (BEL)	March 1, 1992 (aged 26)
Greg Van Avermaet (BEL)	May 17, 1985 (aged 32)
Tejay van Garderen (USA)	August 12, 1988 (aged 29)
Nathan Van Hooydonck (BEL)	October 12, 1995 (aged 22)
Francisco Ventoso (ESP)	May 6, 1982 (aged 35)
Loïc Vliegen (BEL)	December 20, 1993 (aged 24)
Danilo Wyss (SUI)	August 26, 1985 (aged 32)

Riders who joined the team for the 2018 season

Rider	2017 team
Alberto Bettiol	Cannondale–Drapac
Patrick Bevin	Cannondale–Drapac
Simon Gerrans	Orica–Scott
Jürgen Roelandts	Lotto–Soudal

Riders who left the team during or after the 2017 season

Rider	2018 team
Silvan Dillier	AG2R La Mondiale
Martin Elmiger	Retired
Floris Gerts	Roompot–Nederlandse Loterij
Ben Hermans	Israel Cycling Academy
Amaël Moinard	Fortuneo–Samsic
Daniel Oss	Bora–Hansgrohe
Manuel Quinziato	Retired
Samuel Sánchez	Retired
Manuel Senni	Bardiani–CSF

== Season victories ==
Date	Race	Competition	Rider	Country	Location
20 January	Tour Down Under, Stage 5	UCI World Tour	Richie Porte (AUS)	Australia	Willunga Hill
4 February	Volta a la Comunitat Valenciana, Stage 5	UCI Europe Tour	Jurgen Roelandts (BEL)	Spain	Valencia
15 February	Tour of Oman, Stage 3	UCI Asia Tour	Greg Van Avermaet (BEL)	Oman	Wadi Dayqah Dam
24 February	Dubai Tour, Stage 4 (ITT)	UCI Asia Tour	Rohan Dennis (AUS)	United Arab Emirates	Al Maryah Island
7 March	Tirreno–Adriatico, Stage 1	UCI World Tour	Team Time Trial (Note: The winning riders were Greg Van Avermaet, Alberto Bettiol, Patrick Bevin, Damiano Caruso, Rohan Dennis, Stefan Küng and Michael Schar)	Italy	Lido di Camaiore
13 March	Tirreno–Adriatico, Stage 7 (ITT)	UCI World Tour	Rohan Dennis (AUS)	Italy	San Benedetto del Tronto
6 May	Tour de Yorkshire, Overall classification	UCI Europe Tour	Greg Van Avermaet (BEL)	United Kingdom	
16 May	Tour of California, Stage 4 (ITT)	UCI World Tour	Tejay Van Garderen (USA)	United States	Morgan Hill
22 May	Giro d'Italia, Stage 16 (ITT)	UCI World Tour	Rohan Dennis (AUS)	United States	Rovereto
9 June	Tour de Suisse, Stage 1	UCI World Tour	Team Time Trial (Note: The winning riders were Tejay van Garderen, Greg Van Avermaet, Michael Schär, Alessandro De Marchi, Simon Gerrans, Stefan Küng and Richie Porte)	Switzerland	Frauenfeld
17 June	Tour de Suisse, Stage 9 (ITT)	UCI World Tour	Stefan Küng (SUI)	Switzerland	Bellinzona
17 June	Tour de Suisse, Overall classification	UCI World Tour	Richie Porte (AUS)	Switzerland	
9 July	Tour de France, Stage 3	UCI World Tour	Team Time Trial (Note: The winning riders were Tejay van Garderen, Greg Van Avermaet, Michael Schär, Damiano Caruso, Simon Gerrans, Patrick Bevin, Stefan Küng and Richie Porte)	France	Cholet
6 August	Tour of Utah, Prologue	UCI America Tour	Tejay Van Garderen (USA)	United States	St. George
14 August	BinckBank Tour, Stage 2 (ITT)	UCI World Tour	Stefan Küng (SUI)	Netherlands	Venray
25 August	Vuelta a España, Stage 1 (ITT)	UCI World Tour	Rohan Dennis (AUS)	Spain	Málaga
5 September	Vuelta a España, Stage 11	UCI World Tour	Alessandro De Marchi (ITA)	Spain	Ribeira Sacra/Luintra
11 September	Vuelta a España, Stage 16 (ITT)	UCI World Tour	Rohan Dennis (AUS)	Spain	Torrelavega
6 October	Giro dell'Emilia	UCI Europe Tour	Alessandro De Marchi (ITA)	Italy	

== National, Continental and World champions 2018 ==
Date	Discipline	Jersey	Rider	Country	Location
5 January	Australian National Time Trial Champion		Rohan Dennis (AUS)	Australia	Ballarat
21 June	United States National Time Trial Champion		Joey Rosskopf (USA)	United States	Knoxville
27 June	Swiss National Time Trial Champion		Stefan Küng (SUI)	Switzerland	Schneisingen
26 September	World Time Trial Champion		Rohan Dennis (AUS)	Austria	Innsbruck
