= 2018 Katusha–Alpecin season =

Katusha–Alpecin
- 2018 season
- UCI code: TKA
- Status: UCI WorldTeam
- Manager: Vyacheslav Ekimov
- Main sponsor(s): Gazprom & Itera & Rostec & Alpecin
- Based: Switzerland
- Bicycles: Canyon

Season victories
- Stage race stages: 4
- National Championships: 1

The 2018 season for Team Katusha–Alpecin began in January at the Tour Down Under. As a UCI WorldTeam, they were automatically invited and obligated to send a squad to every event in the UCI World Tour.

== Team roster ==
As of 25 February 2018.

Rider	Date of birth
Maxim Belkov (RUS)	9 January 1985 (aged 33)
Jenthe Biermans (BEL)	30 October 1995 (aged 22)
Ian Boswell (USA)	7 February 1991 (aged 27)
Steff Cras (BEL)	13 February 1996 (aged 22)
Alex Dowsett (GBR)	3 October 1988 (aged 29)
Matteo Fabbro (ITA)	10 April 1995 (aged 22)
José Gonçalves (POR)	13 February 1989 (aged 29)
Nathan Haas (AUS)	12 March 1989 (aged 28)
Marco Haller (AUT)	1 April 1991 (aged 26)
Reto Hollenstein (SUI)	22 August 1985 (aged 32)
Marcel Kittel (GER)	11 May 1988 (aged 29)
Robert Kišerlovski (CRO)	9 August 1986 (aged 31)
Pavel Kochetkov (RUS)	7 March 1986 (aged 31)

Rider	Date of birth
Vyacheslav Kuznetsov (RUS)	24 June 1989 (aged 28)
Maurits Lammertink (NED)	31 August 1990 (aged 27)
Tiago Machado (POR)	18 October 1985 (aged 32)
Tony Martin (GER)	23 April 1985 (aged 32)
Marco Mathis (GER)	7 April 1994 (aged 23)
Baptiste Planckaert (BEL)	28 September 1988 (aged 29)
Nils Politt (GER)	6 March 1994 (aged 23)
Jhonatan Restrepo (COL)	24 November 1994 (aged 23)
Willie Smit (RSA)	29 December 1992 (aged 25)
Simon Špilak (SLO)	23 June 1986 (aged 31)
Mads Würtz Schmidt (DEN)	31 March 1994 (aged 23)
Rick Zabel (GER)	7 December 1993 (aged 24)
Ilnur Zakarin (RUS)	15 September 1989 (aged 28)

Riders who joined the team for the 2018 season

Rider	2017 team
Marcel Kittel	Quick-Step Floors
Ian Boswell	Team Sky
Nathan Haas	Team Dimension Data
Alex Dowsett	Movistar Team
Willie Smit	Vini Fantini–Nippo
Steff Cras	BMC Development Team
Matteo Fabbro	

Riders who left the team during or after the 2017 season

Rider	2018 team
Alexander Kristoff	UAE Team Emirates
Ángel Vicioso	Retires
Rein Taaramäe	Direct Énergie
Alberto Losada	Retires
Michael Mørkøv	Quick-Step Floors
Sven Erik Bystrøm	UAE Team Emirates

== Season victories ==
Date	Race	Competition	Rider	Country	Location
14 February	Tour of Oman, Stage 2	UCI Asia Tour	Nathan Haas (AUS)	Oman	Ministry of Tourism
8 March	Tirreno–Adriatico, Stage 2	UCI World Tour	Marcel Kittel (GER)	Italy	Follonica
12 March	Tirreno–Adriatico, Stage 6	UCI World Tour	Marcel Kittel (GER)	Italy	Fano
26 August	Deutschland Tour, Stage 4	UCI Europe Tour	Nils Politt (GER)	Germany	Stuttgart

== National, Continental and World champions 2018 ==
Date	Discipline	Jersey	Rider	Country	Location
29 June	German National Time Trial Champion		Tony Martin (GER)	Germany	Einhausen
