= 2018 Team Bahrain–Merida season =

Bahrain–Merida Pro Cycling Team
- 2018 season
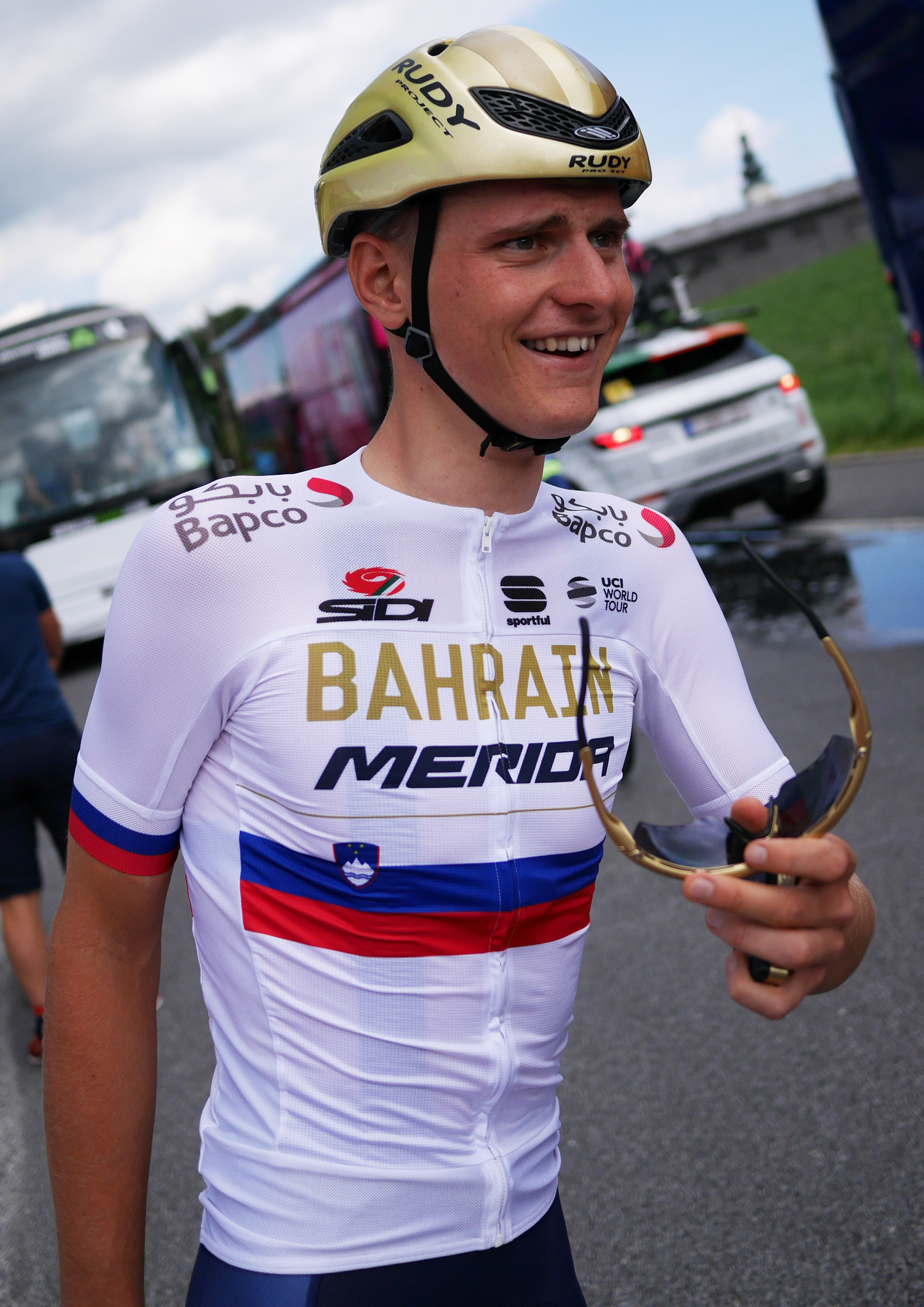
- Matej Mohorič in Tour of Austria
- UCI code: TBM
- Status: UCI WorldTeam
- Manager: Brent Copeland
- Based: Bahrain

Season victories
- One-day races: 4
- Stage race overall: 3
- Stage race stages: 16
- National Championships: 2

The 2018 Bahrain–Merida Pro Cycling season was the second season of the Bahrain–Merida team, which was founded in 2016. As a UCI WorldTeam, they were automatically invited and obligated to send a squad to every event in the UCI World Tour, and their season began in January with the Tour Down Under.

== Team roster ==
As of 17 March 2018.

Rider	Date of birth
Valerio Agnoli (ITA)	6 January 1985 (aged 33)
Yukiya Arashiro (JPN)	22 September 1984 (aged 33)
Manuele Boaro (ITA)	12 March 1987 (aged 31)
Grega Bole (SLO)	13 August 1985 (aged 32)
Niccolò Bonifazio (ITA)	29 October 1993 (aged 24)
Borut Božič (SLO)	8 August 1980 (aged 37)
Sonny Colbrelli (ITA)	17 May 1990 (aged 27)
Feng Chun-kai (TWN)	2 November 1988 (aged 29)
Iván García (ESP)	20 November 1995 (aged 22)
Enrico Gasparotto (ITA)	22 March 1982 (aged 35)
Heinrich Haussler (AUS)	25 February 1984 (aged 34)
Gorka Izagirre (ESP)	7 October 1987 (aged 30)
Ion Izagirre (ESP)	4 February 1989 (aged 29)
Kristijan Koren (SLO)	25 November 1986 (aged 31)

Rider	Date of birth
Matej Mohorič (SLO)	19 October 1994 (aged 23)
Ramūnas Navardauskas (LTU)	30 January 1988 (aged 30)
Antonio Nibali (ITA)	23 September 1992 (aged 25)
Vincenzo Nibali (ITA)	14 November 1984 (aged 33)
Domen Novak (SLO)	12 July 1995 (aged 22)
Mark Padun (UKR)	6 July 1996 (aged 21)
Franco Pellizotti (ITA)	15 January 1978 (aged 40)
David Per (SLO)	13 February 1995 (aged 23)
Hermann Pernsteiner (AUT)	7 August 1990 (aged 27)
Luka Pibernik (SLO)	23 October 1993 (aged 24)
Domenico Pozzovivo (ITA)	30 November 1982 (aged 35)
Kanstantsin Sivtsov (BLR)	9 August 1982 (aged 35)
Giovanni Visconti (ITA)	13 January 1983 (aged 35)
Wang Meiyin (CHN)	26 December 1988 (aged 29)

Riders who joined the team for the 2018 season

Rider	2017 team
Gorka Izagirre	Movistar Team
Kristijan Koren	Cannondale–Drapac
Matej Mohorič	UAE Team Emirates
Mark Padun	Neo-pro
Hermann Pernsteiner	Amplatz–BMC
Domenico Pozzovivo	AG2R La Mondiale

Riders who left the team during or after the 2017 season

Rider	2018 team
Janez Brajkovič	Adria Mobil
Ondrej Cink	Retired from road cycling
Tsgabu Grmay	Trek–Segafredo
Jon Ander Insausti	Fundación Euskadi
Javier Moreno	Delko–Marseille Provence KTM

== Season victories ==
Date	Race	Competition	Rider	Country	Location
9 February	Dubai Tour, Stage 4	UCI Asia Tour	Sonny Colbrelli (ITA)	United Arab Emirates	Hatta Dam
4 March	GP Industria & Artigianato	UCI Europe Tour	Matej Mohorič (SLO)	Italy	Larciano
17 March	Milan–San Remo	UCI World Tour	Vincenzo Nibali (ITA)	Italy	
17 April	Tour of Croatia, Stage 1	UCI Europe Tour	Niccolò Bonifazio (ITA)	Croatia	Koprivnica
19 April	Tour of Croatia, Stage 3	UCI Europe Tour	Kanstantsin Sivtsov (BLR)	Croatia	Sveti Jure - Biokovo
20 April	Tour of the Alps, Stage 5	UCI Europe Tour	Mark Padun (UKR)	Austria	Innsbruck
21 April	Tour of Croatia, Stage 5	UCI Europe Tour	Manuele Boaro (ITA)	Croatia	Učka
22 April	Tour of Croatia, Overall classification	UCI Europe Tour	Kanstantsin Sivtsov (BLR)	Croatia	
15 May	Giro d'Italia, Stage 10	UCI World Tour	Matej Mohorič (SLO)	Italy	Gualdo Tadino
22 May	Tour of Japan, Stage 3	UCI Asia Tour	Grega Bole (SLO)	Japan	Inabe
26 May	Tour of Japan, Stage 7	UCI Asia Tour	Grega Bole (SLO)	Japan	Izu
1 June	Hammer Sportzone Limburg, Stage 1	UCI Europe Tour		Netherlands	
3 June	Gran Premio di Lugano	UCI Europe Tour	Hermann Pernsteiner (AUT)	Switzerland	
11 June	Tour de Suisse, Stage 3	UCI World Tour	Sonny Colbrelli (ITA)	Italy	Gansingen
7 July	Tour of Austria, Stage 1	UCI Europe Tour	Matej Mohorič (SLO)	Austria	Feldkirch
8 July	Tour of Austria, Stage 2	UCI Europe Tour	Giovanni Visconti (ITA)	Austria	Fulpmes / Telfes
10 July	Tour of Austria, Stage 4	UCI Europe Tour	Giovanni Visconti (ITA)	Austria	Prägraten
13 July	Tour of Austria, Stage 7	UCI Europe Tour	Antonio Nibali (ITA)	Austria	Sonntagberg
14 July	Tour of Austria, Stage 8	UCI Europe Tour	Giovanni Visconti (ITA)	Austria	Wels
19 August	BinckBank Tour, Overall classification	UCI World Tour	Matej Mohorič (SLO)	Belgium; Netherlands	
25 August	Deutschland Tour, Stage 3	UCI Europe Tour	Matej Mohorič (SLO)	Germany	Merzig
26 August	Deutschland Tour, Overall classification	UCI Europe Tour	Matej Mohorič (SLO)	Germany	
16 September	Coppa Bernocchi	UCI Europe Tour	Sonny Colbrelli (ITA)	Italy	

== National, Continental and World champions 2018 ==
Date	Discipline	Jersey	Rider	Country	Location
24 June	Spanish National Road Race Championships		Gorka Izagirre (ESP)	Spain	Benicassim
24 June	Slovenian National Road Race Championships		Matej Mohorič (SLO)	Slovenia	Mirna Peč
