= 2018 Movistar Team season =

Movistar Team
- 2018 season
- UCI code: MOV
- Status: UCI WorldTeam
- Manager: Eusebio Unzué
- Main sponsor(s): Telefónica
- Based: Spain
- Bicycles: Canyon
- Groupset: Campagnolo

Season victories
- One-day races: 2
- Stage race overall: 7
- Stage race stages: 17
- World Championships: 1
- Best ranked rider: Alejandro Valverde (1st)

The 2018 season for Movistar Team began in January at the Tour Down Under. As a UCI WorldTeam, they were automatically invited and obligated to send a squad to every event in the UCI World Tour.

== Team roster ==
As of 25 March 2018.

Rider	Date of birth
Andrey Amador (CRC)	August 29, 1986 (aged 31)
Winner Anacona (COL)	August 11, 1988 (aged 29)
Jorge Arcas (ESP)	July 8, 1992 (aged 25)
Carlos Barbero (ESP)	April 29, 1991 (aged 26)
Daniele Bennati (ITA)	September 24, 1980 (aged 37)
Carlos Betancur (COL)	October 13, 1989 (aged 28)
Nuno Bico (POR)	July 3, 1994 (aged 23)
Richard Carapaz (ECU)	May 29, 1993 (aged 24)
Héctor Carretero (ESP)	May 28, 1995 (aged 22)
Jaime Castrillo (ESP)	March 13, 1996 (aged 22)
Víctor de la Parte (ESP)	June 22, 1986 (aged 31)
Imanol Erviti (ESP)	November 15, 1983 (aged 34)
Rubén Fernández (ESP)	March 1, 1991 (aged 27)

Rider	Date of birth
Mikel Landa (ESP)	December 13, 1989 (aged 28)
Nelson Oliveira (POR)	March 6, 1989 (aged 29)
Antonio Pedrero (ESP)	October 23, 1991 (aged 26)
Dayer Quintana (COL)	August 10, 1992 (aged 25)
Nairo Quintana (COL)	February 4, 1990 (aged 28)
José Joaquín Rojas (ESP)	June 8, 1985 (aged 32)
Jaime Rosón (ESP)	January 13, 1993 (aged 25)
Eduardo Sepúlveda (ARG)	June 13, 1991 (aged 26)
Marc Soler (ESP)	November 22, 1993 (aged 24)
Jasha Sütterlin (GER)	November 4, 1992 (aged 25)
Rafael Valls (ESP)	June 25, 1987 (aged 30)
Alejandro Valverde (ESP)	April 25, 1980 (aged 37)

Riders who joined the team for the 2018 season

Rider	2017 team
Jaime Castrillo	
Mikel Landa	Team Sky
Jaime Roson	Caja Rural–Seguros RGA
Eduardo Sepúlveda	Fortuneo–Oscaro
Rafael Valls	Lotto–Soudal

Riders who left the team during or after the 2017 season

Rider	2018 team
Jonathan Castroviejo	Team Sky
Alex Dowsett	Team Katusha–Alpecin
José Herrada	Cofidis
Jesús Herrada	Cofidis
Gorka Izagirre	Bahrain–Merida
Adriano Malori	Retired
Daniel Moreno	EF Education First–Drapac p/b Cannondale
Rory Sutherland	UAE Team Emirates

== Season victories ==
Date	Race	Competition	Rider	Country	Location
1 February	Volta a la Comunitat Valenciana, Stage 2	UCI Europe Tour	Alejandro Valverde (ESP)	Spain	Albuixech
3 February	Volta a la Comunitat Valenciana, Stage 4	UCI Europe Tour	Alejandro Valverde (ESP)	Spain	Cocentaina
4 February	Volta a la Comunitat Valenciana, Overall classification	UCI Europe Tour	Alejandro Valverde (ESP)	Spain	
11 February	Colombia Oro y Paz, Stage 6	UCI America Tour	Dayer Quintana (COL)	Colombia	Torre de Chipre
25 February	Abu Dhabi Tour, Stage 5	UCI World Tour	Alejandro Valverde (ESP)	United Arab Emirates	Jebel Hafeet
25 February	Abu Dhabi Tour, Overall	UCI World Tour	Alejandro Valverde (ESP)	United Arab Emirates	
10 March	Tirreno–Adriatico, Stage 4	UCI World Tour	Mikel Landa (ESP)	Italy	Sarnano–Sassotetto
11 March	Paris–Nice, Overall classification	UCI World Tour	Marc Soler (ESP)	France	
20 March	Volta a Catalunya, Stage 2	UCI World Tour	Alejandro Valverde (ESP)	Spain	Valls
22 March	Volta a Catalunya, Stage 4	UCI World Tour	Alejandro Valverde (ESP)	Spain	La Molina
25 March	Volta a Catalunya, Overall classification	UCI World Tour	Alejandro Valverde (ESP)	Spain	
31 March	GP Miguel Induráin	UCI Europe Tour	Alejandro Valverde (ESP)	Spain	
8 April	Klasika Primavera	UCI Europe Tour	Andrey Amador (CRC)	Spain	
20 April	Vuelta a Castilla y León, Stage 1	UCI Europe Tour	Carlos Barbero (ESP)	Spain	Salamanca
28 April	Vuelta a Asturias, Stage 2	UCI Europe Tour	Richard Carapaz (ECU)	Spain	Alto del Acebo
29 April	Vuelta a Asturias, Overall classification	UCI Europe Tour	Richard Carapaz (ECU)	Spain	
6 May	Vuelta a la Comunidad de Madrid, Stage 3	UCI Europe Tour	Carlos Barbero (ESP)	Spain	Madrid
12 May	Giro d'Italia, Stage 8	UCI World Tour	Richard Carapaz (ECU)	Italy	Montevergine
13 May	Vuelta a Aragón, Overall classification	UCI Europe Tour	Jaime Rosón (ESP)	Spain	
15 June	Tour de Suisse, Stage 7	UCI World Tour	Nairo Quintana (COL)	Switzerland	Arosa
16 June	Route d'Occitanie, Stage 3	UCI Europe Tour	Alejandro Valverde (ESP)	France	Les Monts d'Olmes
17 June	Route d'Occitanie, Overall classification	UCI Europe Tour	Alejandro Valverde (ESP)	France	
25 July	Tour de France, Stage 17	UCI World Tour	Nairo Quintana (COL)	France	Saint-Lary-Soulan
10 August	Vuelta a Burgos, Stage 4	UCI Europe Tour	Carlos Barbero (ESP)	Spain	Clunia
26 August	Vuelta a España, Stage 2	UCI World Tour	Alejandro Valverde (ESP)	Spain	Caminito del Rey
1 September	Vuelta a España, Stage 8	UCI World Tour	Alejandro Valverde (ESP)	Spain	Almadén

== National, Continental and World champions 2018 ==
Date	Discipline	Jersey	Rider	Country	Location
30 September	World Road Race Champion		Alejandro Valverde (ESP)	Austria	Innsbruck
