= 2018 Mitchelton–Scott (men's team) season =

Mitchelton–Scott
- 2018 season
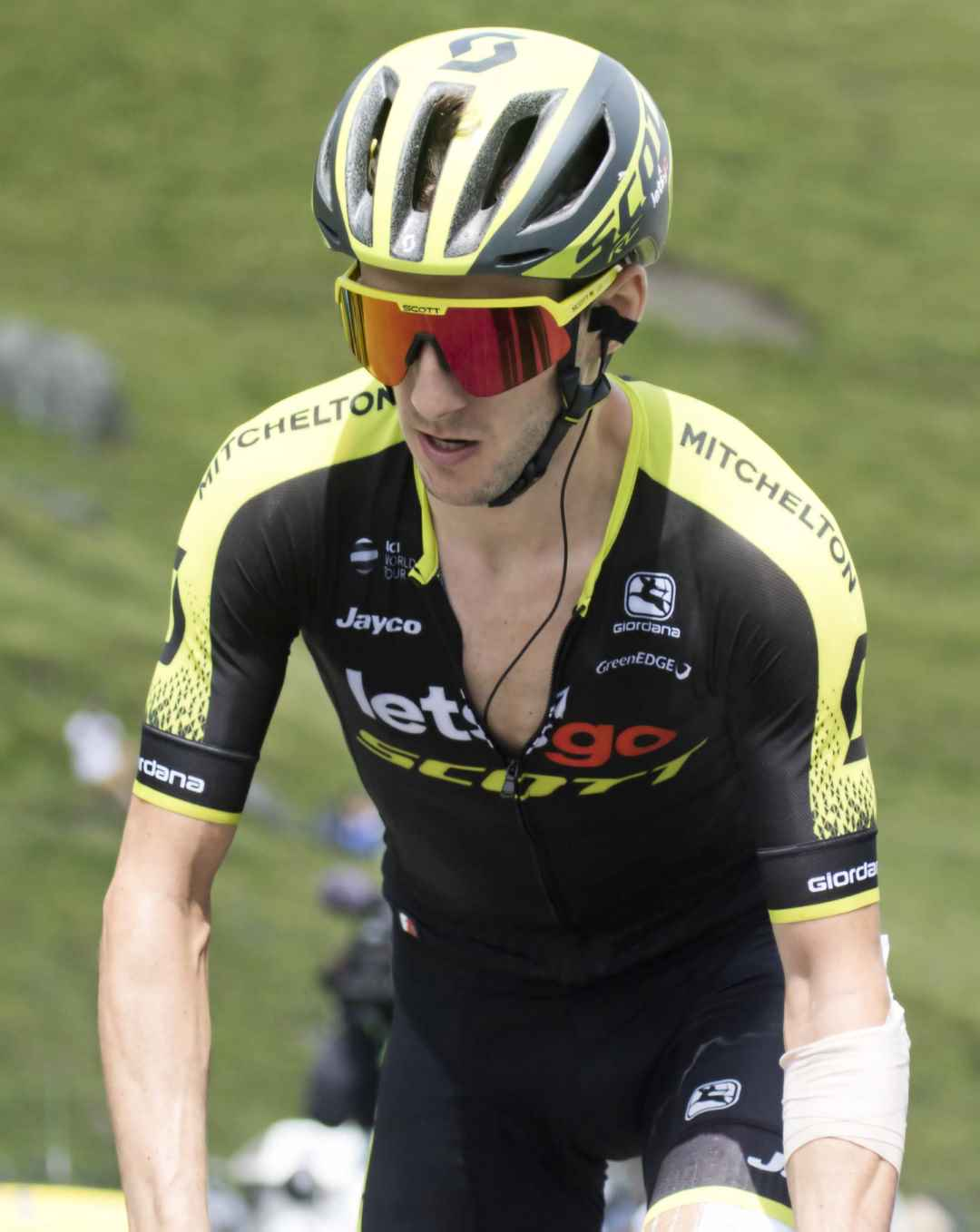
- Adam Yates on 2018 Tour de France
- UCI code: MTS
- Status: UCI WorldTeam
- Manager: Shayne Bannan
- Main sponsor(s): Orica, Scott
- Based: Australia
- Bicycles: Scott
- Groupset: Shimano

Season victories
- One-day races: 2
- Stage race overall: 4
- Stage race stages: 23
- National Championships: 4

The 2018 season for the Mitchelton–Scott cycling team began in January at the Tour Down Under. As a UCI WorldTeam, they were automatically invited and obligated to send a squad to every event in the UCI World Tour.

== Team roster ==
As of 31 March 2018.

| Rider | Date of birth |
|---|---|
| Michael Albasini (SUI) | 20 December 1980 (aged 37) |
| Jack Bauer (NZL) | 7 April 1985 (aged 32) |
| Sam Bewley (NZL) | 22 July 1987 (aged 30) |
| Esteban Chaves (COL) | 17 January 1990 (aged 28) |
| Luke Durbridge (AUS) | 9 April 1991 (aged 26) |
| Alex Edmondson (AUS) | 22 December 1993 (aged 24) |
| Caleb Ewan (AUS) | 11 July 1994 (aged 23) |
| Jack Haig (AUS) | 6 September 1993 (aged 24) |
| Lucas Hamilton (AUS) | 12 February 1996 (aged 22) |
| Mathew Hayman (AUS) | 20 April 1978 (aged 39) |
| Michael Hepburn (AUS) | 17 August 1991 (aged 26) |
| Damien Howson (AUS) | 13 August 1992 (aged 25) |
| Daryl Impey (RSA) | 6 December 1984 (aged 33) |

| Rider | Date of birth |
|---|---|
| Christopher Juul-Jensen (DEN) | 6 July 1989 (aged 28) |
| Roger Kluge (GER) | 5 February 1986 (aged 32) |
| Roman Kreuziger (CZE) | 6 May 1986 (aged 31) |
| Cameron Meyer (AUS) | 11 January 1988 (aged 30) |
| Luka Mezgec (SLO) | 27 June 1988 (aged 29) |
| Mikel Nieve (ESP) | 26 May 1984 (aged 33) |
| Robert Power (AUS) | 11 May 1995 (aged 22) |
| Matteo Trentin (ITA) | 2 August 1989 (aged 28) |
| Svein Tuft (CAN) | 9 May 1977 (aged 40) |
| Carlos Verona (ESP) | 4 November 1992 (aged 25) |
| Adam Yates (GBR) | 7 August 1992 (aged 25) |
| Simon Yates (GBR) | 7 August 1992 (aged 25) |

Riders who joined the team for the 2018 season

| Rider | 2017 team |
|---|---|
| Jack Bauer | Quick-Step Floors |
| Lucas Hamilton | Mitchelton Scott |
| Cameron Meyer | Mitchelton Scott |
| Mikel Nieve | Team Sky |
| Matteo Trentin | Quick-Step Floors |

Riders who left the team during or after the 2017 season

| Rider | 2018 team |
|---|---|
| Magnus Cort Nielsen | Astana |
| King Lok Cheung | HKSI Pro Cycling Team |
| Mitchell Docker | EF Education First–Drapac p/b Cannondale |
| Simon Gerrans | BMC Racing Team |
| Jens Keukeleire | Lotto–Soudal |
| Rubén Plaza | Israel Cycling Academy |

== Season victories ==
| Date | Race | Competition | Rider | Country | Location |
|---|---|---|---|---|---|
| 17 January | Tour Down Under, Stage 2 | UCI World Tour | Caleb Ewan (AUS) | Australia | Stirling |
| 21 January | Tour Down Under, Overall classification | UCI World Tour | Daryl Impey (RSA) | Australia | |
| 3 February | Herald Sun Tour, Stage 3 | UCI Oceania Tour | Esteban Chaves (COL) | Australia | Lake Mountain |
| 4 February | Herald Sun Tour, Overall classification | UCI Oceania Tour | Esteban Chaves (COL) | Australia | |
| 11 February | Clásica de Almería | UCI Europe Tour | Caleb Ewan (AUS) | Spain | |
| 10 March | Paris–Nice, Stage 7 | UCI World Tour | Simon Yates (GBR) | France | Valdeblore La Colmiane |
| 11 March | Tirreno–Adriatico, Stage 5 | UCI World Tour | Adam Yates (GBR) | Italy | Filottrano |
| 25 March | Volta a Catalunya, Stage 7 | UCI World Tour | Simon Yates (GBR) | Spain | Barcelona |
| 10 May | Giro d'Italia, Stage 6 | UCI World Tour | Esteban Chaves (COL) | Italy | Etna |
| 13 May | Giro d'Italia, Stage 9 | UCI World Tour | Simon Yates (GBR) | Italy | Gran Sasso |
| 16 May | Giro d'Italia, Stage 11 | UCI World Tour | Simon Yates (GBR) | Italy | Osimo |
| 20 May | Giro d'Italia, Stage 15 | UCI World Tour | Simon Yates (GBR) | Italy | Sappada |
| 23 May | Tour des Fjords, Stage 2 | UCI Europe Tour | Michael Albasini (SUI) | Norway | Kristiansand |
| 24 May | Tour des Fjords, Overall classification | UCI Europe Tour | Michael Albasini (SUI) | Norway | |
| 25 May | Hammer Stavanger, Stage 1 | UCI Europe Tour | Team Time Trial (Note: The winning riders were Michael Albasini, Lucas Hamilton, Damien Howson, Daryl Impey and Cameron Meyer) | Norway | Sandness |
| 26 May | Hammer Stavanger, Stage 2 | UCI Europe Tour | Team Time Trial (Note: The winning riders were Michael Albasini, Lucas Hamilton, Damien Howson, Daryl Impey and Cameron Meyer) | Norway | Stavanger |
| 26 May | Giro d'Italia, Stage 20 | UCI World Tour | Mikel Nieve (ESP) | Italy | Cervinia |
| 27 May | Hammer Stavanger, Stage 3 | UCI Europe Tour | Team Time Trial (Note: The winning riders were Roger Kluge, Lucas Hamilton, Damien Howson, Daryl Impey and Cameron Meyer) | Norway | Stavanger |
| 27 May | Hammer Stavanger, Overall classification | UCI Europe Tour | Team Time Trial (Note: The winning riders were Roger Kluge, Michael Albasini, Lucas Hamilton, Damien Howson, Daryl Impey and Cameron Meyer) | Norway | Stavanger |
| 2 June | Hammer Sportzone Limburg, Stage 2 | UCI Europe Tour | Team Time Trial (Note: The winning riders were Mathew Hayman, Roger Kluge, Jack Bauer, Caleb Ewan and Luka Mezgec) | Netherlands | Sittard-Geleen |
| 3 June | Hammer Sportzone Limburg, Stage 3 | UCI Europe Tour | Team Time Trial (Note: The winning riders were Mathew Hayman, Roger Kluge, Jack Bauer, Luke Durbridge and Michael Hepburn) | Netherlands | Sittard-Geleen |
| 4 June | Critérium du Dauphiné, Stage 1 | UCI World Tour | Daryl Impey (RSA) | France | Saint-Just-Saint-Rambert |
| 10 June | Critérium du Dauphiné, Stage 7 | UCI World Tour | Adam Yates (GBR) | France | Saint-Gervais Mont Blanc |
| 12 June | Tour de Suisse, Stage 4 | UCI World Tour | Christopher Juul-Jensen (DEN) | Switzerland | Gstaad |
| 25 July | Prueba Villafranca de Ordizia | UCI Europe Tour | Robert Power (AUS) | Spain | |
| 10 August | Tour de Pologne, Stage 7 | UCI World Tour | Simon Yates (GBR) | Poland | Bukowina Tatrzańska |
| 3 September | Tour of Britain, Stage 2 | UCI Europe Tour | Cameron Meyer (AUS) | United Kingdom | Barnstaple |
| 8 September | Vuelta a España, Stage 14 | UCI World Tour | Simon Yates (GBR) | Spain | Les Praeres de Nava |
| 9 September | Tour of Britain, Stage 8 | UCI Europe Tour | Caleb Ewan (AUS) | United Kingdom | London |
| 16 September | Vuelta a España, Overall classification | UCI World Tour | Simon Yates (GBR) | Spain | |

== National, Continental and World champions 2018 ==
| Date | Discipline | Jersey | Rider | Country | Location |
|---|---|---|---|---|---|
| 7 January | Australian National Road Race Champion | | Alex Edmondson (AUS) | Australia | Buninyong |
| 7 February | South African National Time Trial Champion | | Daryl Impey (RSA) | South Africa | Oudtshoorn |
| 10 February | South African National Road Race Champion | | Daryl Impey (RSA) | South Africa | Wellington |
| 21 June | Canadian National Time Trial Champion | | Svein Tuft (CAN) | Canada | Falardeau |
| 12 August | European Road Race Champion | | Matteo Trentin (ITA) | Scotland | Glasgow |
