= 2018 UCI World Tour =

Road cycling competitions

2018 UCI WorldTour
- Eighth edition of the UCI World Tour

Details
- Dates: 16 January – 21 October
- Location: Australia; China; Europe; Middle East; North America
- Races: 37

Champions
- Individual champion: Simon Yates (Great Britain) (Mitchelton–Scott)
- Teams' champion: Quick-Step Floors

The 2018 UCI World Tour was a competition that included thirty-seven road cycling events throughout the 2018 men's cycling season. It was the tenth and final edition of the ranking system launched by the Union Cycliste Internationale (UCI) in 2009. The competition began with the opening stage of the Tour Down Under on 16 January and concluded with the final stage of the Tour of Guangxi on 21 October. Belgium's Greg Van Avermaet was the defending champion.

== Summary ==
Van Avermaet was unable to defend his World Tour title, as he failed to take a single individual win – he was a part of three team time trial victories for the BMC Racing Team however – as he finished fifth in the points rankings. The rankings were topped for the first time by British rider Simon Yates, riding for the Mitchelton–Scott team, who amassed 3,072 points over the course of the season. Yates was the last of four riders to take the overall lead of standings during the season; he had ranked highly in the standings earlier in 2018, taking stage victories at Paris–Nice, and the Volta a Catalunya, before a break-through performance at the Giro d'Italia with three stage wins and thirteen days in the race lead; ultimately, Yates cracked in the mountains during the third week and ceded overall victory to compatriot Chris Froome. After another stage win and a second-place overall finish at the Tour de Pologne, Yates won his first Grand Tour at the Vuelta a España, taking the race lead definitively after a stage victory on stage fourteen, and the rankings lead when the race concluded.

80 points behind, in second place, was Slovakia's Peter Sagan, riding for Bora–Hansgrohe. Sagan led the standings for most of the season, having recorded consistent top-six finishes during the spring Classic races, with victories at Gent–Wevelgem, and for the first time, Paris–Roubaix. Sagan won three stages at the Tour de France as he won a record-equalling sixth points classification victory, but was unable to win any stages at the Vuelta a España, where Yates took the lead. In third place, with 2,609 points, was Alejandro Valverde of Spain, who rode for the Movistar Team. Valverde held the rankings lead in the spring, winning two general classifications at the Abu Dhabi Tour, and the Volta a Catalunya, in February and March – winning three stages over those races as well – before two stage victories and victory in the points classification at the Vuelta a España.

In the concurrent teams' standings, Quick-Step Floors prevailed with 13,425.97 points, having held the classification lead for three-quarters of the season, and not been headed since late March. The team took 37 victories – out of a total of 73 wins during all UCI-classified races – at the World Tour level, including seven overall victories taken by Niki Terpstra (E3 Harelbeke and the Tour of Flanders), Yves Lampaert (Dwars door Vlaanderen), Julian Alaphilippe (La Flèche Wallonne and Clásica de San Sebastián), Bob Jungels (Liège–Bastogne–Liège), and Elia Viviani (EuroEyes Cyclassics). The team also took 13 stage victories at the Grand Tours, with two classification jerseys won by Viviani (points at the Giro d'Italia), and Alaphilippe, who won the polka-dot jersey at the Tour de France. 2017 teams classification winners Team Sky finished second with 10,213 points, with the team winning two of the three Grand Tours; Froome became the seventh rider to win all three Grand Tours with his Giro d'Italia success, while Geraint Thomas won the Tour de France, after success at the Critérium du Dauphiné. Team Sky took four other general classification victories: Michał Kwiatkowski won Tirreno–Adriatico, and the Tour de Pologne, Egan Bernal won the Tour of California in his first season with the team, while Gianni Moscon won the season-ending Tour of Guangxi. With 9,201 points, Bora–Hansgrohe finished in third place primarily down to Sagan's performances, with further wins to Jay McCarthy (Cadel Evans Great Ocean Road Race), and Pascal Ackermann at the RideLondon–Surrey Classic. Ackermann and Sam Bennett also took eleven World Tour stage victories between them during the season, with Bennett taking three at a Grand Tour, in the Giro d'Italia.

== Teams ==
2018 UCI WorldTeams and equipment
Code	Official Team Name	Country	Groupset	Road Bike(s)	Time Trial Bike	Wheels
ALM	AG2R La Mondiale (2018 season)	France	Shimano	Factor Bikes o2 Factor Bikes ONE; Factor Bikes ONE–S	Factor Bikes Slick	Mavic
AST	Astana (2018 season)	Kazakhstan	Shimano	Argon 18 Gallium Pro; Argon 18 Nitrogen Pro; Argon Krypton	E-118 Next	Corima
TBM	Bahrain–Merida (2018 season)	Bahrain	Shimano	Merida Scultura; Merida Reacto	Merida Warp	Fulcrum
BMC	BMC Racing Team (2018 season)	United States	Shimano	BMC Teammachine SLR01; BMC Timemachine TMR01; BMC Roadmachine RM01	BMC TimeMachine TM01	Shimano
BOH	Bora–Hansgrohe (2018 season)	Germany	Shimano	S-Works Venge; S-Works Tarmac; S-Works Roubaix	S-Works Shiv	Roval
DDD	Team Dimension Data (2018 season)	South Africa	Shimano/Rotor	Cervélo S5; Cervélo R5; Cervélo C5	Cervélo P5	Enve
EFD	EF Education First–Drapac p/b Cannondale (2018 season)	United States	Shimano/FSA	Cannondale SuperSix EVO Hi-Mod; Cannondale Synapse Hi-Mod; Cannondale SystemSix Hi-Mod	Cannondale Slice Hi-Mod	Vision
FDJ	Groupama–FDJ (2018 season)	France	Shimano	Lapierre Xelius SL; Lapierre Aircode SL; Lapierre Pulsium	Lapierre Aerostorm DRS	Shimano
TKA	Team Katusha–Alpecin (2018 season)	Switzerland	SRAM	Canyon Ultimate CF SLX; Canyon Aeroad CF SLX; Canyon Endurace CF SL	Canyon Speedmax CF	Zipp
TLJ	LottoNL–Jumbo (2018 season)	Netherlands	Shimano	Bianchi OltreXR4, OltreXR2; Bianchi Specialissima; Bianchi Aria	Bianchi Aquila CV	Shimano
LTS	Lotto–Soudal (2018 season)	Belgium	Campagnolo	Ridley Helium SLX; Ridley Noah SL; Ridley Fenix SL	Ridley Dean Fast	Campagnolo
MTS	Mitchelton–Scott (2018 season)	Australia	Shimano	Scott Foil; Scott Addict	Scott Plasma	Shimano
MOV	Movistar Team (2018 season)	Spain	Campagnolo	Canyon Ultimate CF SLX; Canyon Aeroad CF SLX; Canyon Endurace CF SL	Canyon Speedmax CF	Campagnolo
QST	Quick-Step Floors (2018 season)	Belgium	Shimano/FSA	S-Works Venge; S-Works Tarmac; S-Works Roubaix	S-Works Shiv	Roval; HED
SKY	Team Sky (2018 season)	Great Britain	Shimano	Pinarello Dogma F10; Pinarello Dogma K8-S; Pinarello GAN	Pinarello Bolide	Shimano
SUN	Team Sunweb (2018 season)	Germany	Shimano	Giant TCR Advanced SL; Giant Propel Advanced SL; Giant Defy Advanced SL	Giant Trinity	Giant
TFS	Trek–Segafredo (2018 season)	United States	Shimano	Trek Emonda; Trek Madone; Trek Domane	Trek SpeedConcept	Bontrager
UAD	UAE Team Emirates (2018 season)	United Arab Emirates	Campagnolo	Colnago c64, C60; Colnago Concept; Colnago V1-R	Colnago K-Zero	Campagnolo

== Events ==
Races in the 2018 UCI World Tour
Race	Date	Winner		Second		Third		Additional points	
Race	Date	Winner		Second		Third		Stage	Leader
(Australia) Tour Down Under	16–21 January	Daryl Impey (RSA)	500 pts	Richie Porte (AUS)	400 pts	Tom-Jelte Slagter (NED)	325 pts	60, 25, 10 pts	10 pts
(Australia) Great Ocean Road Race	28 January	Jay McCarthy (AUS)	300 pts	Elia Viviani (ITA)	250 pts	Daryl Impey (RSA)	215 pts	—N/a	
(United Arab Emirates) Abu Dhabi Tour	21–25 February	Alejandro Valverde (ESP)	300 pts	Wilco Kelderman (NED)	250 pts	Miguel Ángel López (COL)	215 pts	40, 15, 6 pts	6 pts
(Belgium) Omloop Het Nieuwsblad	24 February	Michael Valgren (DEN)	300 pts	Łukasz Wiśniowski (POL)	250 pts	Sep Vanmarcke (BEL)	215 pts	—N/a	
(Italy) Strade Bianche	3 March	Tiesj Benoot (BEL)	300 pts	Romain Bardet (FRA)	250 pts	Wout van Aert (BEL)	0 pts (Note: As van Aert was riding for Vérandas Willems–Crelan, which is not a UCI WorldTeam, he was ineligible to score points towards the UCI World Tour standings.)	—N/a	
(France) Paris–Nice	4–11 March	Marc Soler (ESP)	500 pts	Simon Yates (GBR)	400 pts	Gorka Izagirre (ESP)	325 pts	60, 25, 10 pts	10 pts
(Italy) Tirreno–Adriatico	7–13 March	Michał Kwiatkowski (POL)	500 pts	Damiano Caruso (ITA)	400 pts	Geraint Thomas (GBR)	325 pts	60, 25, 10 pts	10 pts
(Italy) Milan–San Remo	17 March	Vincenzo Nibali (ITA)	500 pts	Caleb Ewan (AUS)	400 pts	Arnaud Démare (FRA)	325 pts	—N/a	
(Spain) Volta a Catalunya	19–25 March	Alejandro Valverde (ESP)	400 pts	Nairo Quintana (COL)	320 pts	Pierre Latour (FRA)	260 pts	50, 20, 8 pts	8 pts
(Belgium) E3 Harelbeke	23 March	Niki Terpstra (NED)	400 pts	Philippe Gilbert (BEL)	320 pts	Greg Van Avermaet (BEL)	260 pts	—N/a	
(Belgium) Gent–Wevelgem	25 March	Peter Sagan (SVK)	500 pts	Elia Viviani (ITA)	400 pts	Arnaud Démare (FRA)	325 pts	—N/a	
(Belgium) Dwars door Vlaanderen	28 March	Yves Lampaert (BEL)	300 pts	Mike Teunissen (NED)	250 pts	Sep Vanmarcke (BEL)	215 pts	—N/a	
(Belgium) Tour of Flanders	1 April	Niki Terpstra (NED)	500 pts	Mads Pedersen (DEN)	400 pts	Philippe Gilbert (BEL)	325 pts	—N/a	
(Spain) Tour of the Basque Country	2–7 April	Primož Roglič (SLO)	400 pts	Mikel Landa (ESP)	320 pts	Ion Izagirre (ESP)	260 pts	50, 20, 8 pts	8 pts
(France) Paris–Roubaix	8 April	Peter Sagan (SVK)	500 pts	Silvan Dillier (SUI)	400 pts	Niki Terpstra (NED)	325 pts	—N/a	
(Netherlands) Amstel Gold Race	15 April	Michael Valgren (DEN)	500 pts	Roman Kreuziger (CZE)	400 pts	Enrico Gasparotto (ITA)	325 pts	—N/a	
(Belgium) La Flèche Wallonne	18 April	Julian Alaphilippe (FRA)	400 pts	Alejandro Valverde (ESP)	320 pts	Jelle Vanendert (BEL)	260 pts	—N/a	
(Belgium) Liège–Bastogne–Liège	22 April	Bob Jungels (LUX)	500 pts	Michael Woods (CAN)	400 pts	Romain Bardet (FRA)	325 pts	—N/a	
(Switzerland) Tour de Romandie	24–29 April	Primož Roglič (SLO)	500 pts	Egan Bernal (COL)	400 pts	Richie Porte (AUS)	325 pts	60, 25, 10 pts	10 pts
(Germany) Eschborn–Frankfurt	1 May	Alexander Kristoff (NOR)	300 pts	Michael Matthews (AUS)	250 pts	Oliver Naesen (BEL)	215 pts	—N/a	
(Italy) Giro d'Italia	4–27 May	Chris Froome (GBR)	850 pts	Tom Dumoulin (NED)	680 pts	Miguel Ángel López (COL)	575 pts	100, 40, 20, 12, 4 pts	20 pts
(United States) Tour of California	13–19 May	Egan Bernal (COL)	300 pts	Tejay van Garderen (USA)	250 pts	Daniel Martínez (COL)	215 pts	40, 15, 6 pts	6 pts
(France) Critérium du Dauphiné	3–10 June	Geraint Thomas (GBR)	500 pts	Adam Yates (GBR)	400 pts	Romain Bardet (FRA)	325 pts	60, 25, 10 pts	10 pts
(Switzerland) Tour de Suisse	9–17 June	Richie Porte (AUS)	500 pts	Jakob Fuglsang (DEN)	400 pts	Nairo Quintana (COL)	325 pts	60, 25, 10	10 pts
Tour de France	7–29 July	Geraint Thomas (GBR)	1000 pts	Tom Dumoulin (NED)	800 pts	Chris Froome (GBR)	675 pts	120, 50, 25, 15, 5 pts	25 pts
(United Kingdom) RideLondon–Surrey Classic	29 July	Pascal Ackermann (GER)	300 pts	Elia Viviani (ITA)	250 pts	Giacomo Nizzolo (ITA)	215 pts	—N/a	
(Spain) Clásica de San Sebastián	4 August	Julian Alaphilippe (FRA)	400 pts	Bauke Mollema (NED)	320 pts	Anthony Roux (FRA)	260 pts	—N/a	
(Poland) Tour de Pologne	4–10 August	Michał Kwiatkowski (POL)	400 pts	Simon Yates (GBR)	320 pts	Thibaut Pinot (FRA)	260 pts	50, 20, 8 pts	8 pts
(Belgium) / (Netherlands) BinckBank Tour	13–19 August	Matej Mohorič (SLO)	400 pts	Michael Matthews (AUS)	320 pts	Tim Wellens (BEL)	260 pts	50, 20, 8 pts	8 pts
(Germany) EuroEyes Cyclassics	19 August	Elia Viviani (ITA)	400 pts	Arnaud Démare (FRA)	320 pts	Alexander Kristoff (NOR)	260 pts	—N/a	
(Spain) Vuelta a España	25 August – 16 September	Simon Yates (GBR)	850 pts	Enric Mas (ESP)	680 pts	Miguel Ángel López (COL)	575 pts	100, 40, 20, 12, 4 pts	20 pts
Bretagne Classic Ouest–France	26 August	Oliver Naesen (BEL)	400 pts	Michael Valgren (DEN)	320 pts	Tim Wellens (BEL)	260 pts	—N/a	
(Canada) GP de Québec	7 September	Michael Matthews (AUS)	500 pts	Greg Van Avermaet (BEL)	400 pts	Jasper Stuyven (BEL)	325 pts	—N/a	
(Canada) GP de Montréal	9 September	Michael Matthews (AUS)	500 pts	Sonny Colbrelli (ITA)	400 pts	Greg Van Avermaet (BEL)	325 pts	—N/a	
Presidential Tour of Turkey	9–14 October	Eduard Prades (ESP)	0 pts (Note: As Prades was riding for Euskadi–Murias, which is not a UCI WorldTeam, he was ineligible to score points towards the UCI World Tour standings.)	Alexey Lutsenko (KAZ)	250 pts	Nathan Haas (AUS)	215 pts	40, 15, 6 pts	6 pts
(Italy) Il Lombardia	13 October	Thibaut Pinot (FRA)	500 pts	Vincenzo Nibali (ITA)	400 pts	Dylan Teuns (BEL)	325 pts	—N/a	
(China) Tour of Guangxi	16–21 October	Gianni Moscon (ITA)	300 pts	Felix Großschartner (AUT)	250 pts	Sergey Chernetskiy (RUS)	215 pts	40, 15, 6 pts	6 pts

== Final points standings ==
=== Individual ===
For riders that had the same number of points, ties in placings were resolved by number of victories, then number of second places, third places, and so on, in World Tour events and stages.

Rank	Name	Team	Points
1	Simon Yates (GBR)	Mitchelton–Scott	3072
2	Peter Sagan (SVK)	Bora–Hansgrohe	2992
3	Alejandro Valverde (ESP)	Movistar Team	2609
4	Geraint Thomas (GBR)	Team Sky	2534.25
5	Greg Van Avermaet (BEL)	BMC Racing Team	2442.14
6	Elia Viviani (ITA)	Quick-Step Floors	2399
7	Michael Matthews (AUS)	Team Sunweb	2393.19
8	Julian Alaphilippe (FRA)	Quick-Step Floors	2161.12
9	Chris Froome (GBR)	Team Sky	1976.68
10	Tom Dumoulin (NED)	Team Sunweb	1975.62
11	Primož Roglič (SLO)	LottoNL–Jumbo	1951
12	Michael Valgren (DEN)	Astana	1803
13	Miguel Ángel López (COL)	Astana	1610
14	Romain Bardet (FRA)	AG2R La Mondiale	1530
15	Oliver Naesen (BEL)	AG2R La Mondiale	1516
16	Michał Kwiatkowski (POL)	Team Sky	1515.25
17	Thibaut Pinot (FRA)	Groupama–FDJ	1500
18	Tim Wellens (BEL)	Lotto–Soudal	1480
19	Jasper Stuyven (BEL)	Trek–Segafredo	1459
20	Steven Kruijswijk (NED)	LottoNL–Jumbo	1456
21	Arnaud Démare (FRA)	Groupama–FDJ	1447
22	Nairo Quintana (COL)	Movistar Team	1417
23	Ion Izagirre (ESP)	Bahrain–Merida	1403
24	Niki Terpstra (NED)	Quick-Step Floors	1380.12
25	Richie Porte (AUS)	BMC Racing Team	1368.57

- 418 riders scored points. 198 other riders finished in positions that would have earned them points, but they were ineligible as members of non-UCI WorldTeams.

=== Team ===
For the team rankings, this was calculated by adding the ranking points of all the riders of a team.

Rank	Team	Points	Point-scoring riders
1	Quick-Step Floors	13425.97	27 riders Viviani (2399), Alaphilippe (2161.12), Terpstra (1380.12), Mas (1324.43), Štybar (1021), Gilbert (1015.55), Jungels (741.12), Gaviria (537.55), Schachmann (512), Lampaert (497.55), Devenyns (476), Jakobsen (233), Hodeg (211), Cavagna (183), Serry (138), Richeze (126.55), De Plus (123), Capecchi (81), Knox (64), Mørkøv (49), Sénéchal (44), Declercq (42.55), Narváez (21), Keisse (18.43), Sabatini (16), Asgreen (5), Martinelli (5)
2	Team Sky	10213	28 riders G. Thomas (2534.25), Froome (1976.68), Kwiatkowski (1515.25), Bernal (1204.25), Moscon (623.25), Ser. Henao (391), de la Cruz (332), van Baarle (328.57), Wiśniowski (250), Geoghegan Hart (199.57), Castroviejo (182.25), Poels (176.25), Doull (114), Sivakov (70), Seb. Henao (58), Basso (46), Gołaś (32), Dunbar (30), Lawless (30), Rowe (27.82), Puccio (25.43), Kiryienka (21.43), Elissonde (12), Rosa (10), D. López (10), Knees (7), Stannard (5), Dibben (1)
3	Bora–Hansgrohe	9201	21 riders P. Sagan (2992), Konrad (929), Buchmann (841), Formolo (779), S. Bennett (750), Majka (664), Ackermann (647), McCarthy (458), Großschartner (402), Mühlberger (235), Burghardt (164), Oss (112), Poljański (51), Pfingsten (42), Kennaugh (42), Selig (34), Bodnar (24), Pöstlberger (12), Benedetti (8), J. Sagan (8), Schillinger (7)
4	BMC Racing Team	8779.97	23 riders Van Avermaet (2442.14), Porte (1368.57), Teuns (991.57), Dennis (842.57), Caruso (807.14), van Garderen (404.57), Roelandts (392), Küng (341.14), Drucker (218), De Marchi (188.57), Gerrans (163.57), Schär (97.14), Rosskopf (88.57), Bevin (84.14), Bookwalter (82.57), Roche (70), Frankiny (56), Van Hooydonck (42), Bohli (36.57), Wyss (29.57), Bettiol (16.57), Ventoso (9), Scotson (8)
5	Mitchelton–Scott	8660.03	21 riders S. Yates (3072), Impey (1137.45), A. Yates (1072.45), Kreuziger (842), Ewan (619.57), Trentin (494), Nieve (289.88), Verona (216), Haig (188), Power (137), Chaves (132), Juul-Jensen (111), Mezgec (103.57), Bauer (53.45), Durbridge (44.45), Meyer (40), Hayman (37.88), L. Hamilton (30), Howson (26.88), Hepburn (7.45), Edmondson (5)
6	Astana	7869 (Note: Listed by UCI on 7859 points, missing Truls Korsæth's points from Paris–Roubaix.)	25 riders Valgren (1803), M. López (1610), Fuglsang (1209), Bilbao (564), Cort (395), Lutsenko (388), Fraile (349), Sánchez (347), Chernetskiy (311), Kangert (196), J. Hansen (190), Villella (99), Houle (90), Hrivko (50), Stalnov (48), Tleubayev (40), Cataldo (40), Zeits (38), Hirt (32), De Vreese (25), Gatto (20), Korsæth (10), (Note: Points not listed with any team.) Gidich (8), Fominykh (5), Kozhatayev (2)
7	Bahrain–Merida	7409	24 riders I. Izagirre (1403), V. Nibali (1046), Pozzovivo (987), Colbrelli (842), G. Izagirre (698), Mohorič (686), Gasparotto (629), García (189), Visconti (189), Bonifazio (154), Bole (123), Haussler (111), Pernsteiner (83), Pellizotti (79), Pibernik (39), Padun (39), Koren (26), Navardauskas (20), Sivtsov (20), Arashiro (11), Novak (10), Agnoli (10), A. Nibali (10), Boaro (5)
8	Movistar Team	7351	23 riders Valverde (2609), N. Quintana (1417), Landa (956), Soler (775), Carapaz (774), Rosón (160), Fernández (105), Rojas (83), Betancur (79), Amador (78), Oliveira (46), Sepúlveda (44), Sütterlin (43), Erviti (33), Anacona (30), Pedrero (28), de la Parte (23), Arcas (17), Valls (16), Barbero (16), Carretero (7), D. Quintana (7), Castrillo (5)
9	Team Sunweb	7266.95	20 riders Matthews (2393.19), T. Dumoulin (1975.62), Kelderman (640.57), Oomen (618.57), Teunissen (413), Kragh Andersen (308.19), Arndt (238.19), Theuns (180.19), Bauhaus (180), Geschke (54.19), ten Dam (53.62), Walscheid (43), Hindley (39), C. Hamilton (37), Vervaeke (32), Tusveld (26), Storer (22), Curvers (10), Kämna (2), Haga (0.62)
10	LottoNL–Jumbo	7059	23 riders Roglič (1951), Kruijswijk (1456), G. Bennett (906), Roosen (608), Gesink (406), Groenewegen (383), Battaglin (310), Tolhoek (241), D. van Poppel (202), Grøndahl Jansen (120), De Tier (113), van Emden (111), Wynants (48), Martens (48), Van Hoecke (39), Bouwman (36), Powless (22), Kuss (18), Olivier (15), Lindeman (11), Boom (8), Eenkhoorn (5), Leezer (2)
11	AG2R La Mondiale	6397	29 riders Bardet (1530), O. Naesen (1516), Latour (798), Dillier (460), Vuillermoz (289), Gallopin (283), Frank (255), Geniez (252), Cherel (142), Cosnefroy (130), Bakelants (94), Bidard (70), Vandenbergh (67), Dupont (66), Denz (65), Gastauer (64), Gautier (62), Barbier (55), Domont (45), Peters (34), Montaguti (27), Jaurégui (24), Venturini (14), Chevrier (13), Paret-Peintre (12), S. Dumoulin (10), Bagdonas (8), Gougeard (8), Duval (4)
12	UAE Team Emirates	5495	22 riders Kristoff (1323), Ulissi (1127), D. Martin (1101), Costa (669), Aru (215), Polanc (209), Consonni (195), Đurasek (133), Bystrøm (90), Ravasi (83), Conti (83), Marcato (66), Riabushenko (55), Bono (30), Stake Laengen (29), Mori (26), Aït El Abdia (15), Ferrari (11), Atapuma (10), Ganna (10), Swift (10), Petilli (5)
13	Trek–Segafredo	5428	23 riders Stuyven (1459), Mollema (904), Degenkolb (577), Pedersen (520), Nizzolo (457), Guerreiro (443), Skujiņš (190), Brambilla (172), Felline (156), Grmay (116), Bernard (105), de Kort (103), Pantano (80), Conci (30), Stetina (23), Eg (20), Didier (15), Gogl (15), Rast (15), Mullen (10), B. van Poppel (10), Beppu (5), Reijnen (3)
14	Groupama–FDJ	5102	19 riders Pinot (1500), Démare (1447), Molard (459), Roux (397), Vichot (262), Preidler (250), Madouas (214), Gaudu (154), Le Gac (127), Reichenbach (110), Morabito (39), Vincent (34), Guarnieri (34), Sarreau (28), Cimolai (18), Seigle (13), Ladagnous (10), Ludvigsson (5), Sinkeldam (1)
15	Lotto–Soudal	4700.01	23 riders Wellens (1480), Benoot (1095.43), Vanendert (448.43), Debusschere (349), Greipel (294), De Gendt (231.43), Wallays (151.43), Lambrecht (137), Campenaerts (95.43), Bak (92), De Buyst (60), Monfort (34), Mertz (30), A. Hansen (30), Armée (29), Maes (28), Sieberg (28), Van der Sande (23), Keukeleire (21.43), Frison (20), Shaw (13), L. Naesen (5), Marczyński (4.43)
16	EF Education First–Drapac p/b Cannondale	4373	22 riders Urán (912), Vanmarcke (858), Woods (728), Martínez (454), Modolo (343), Rolland (236), S. Clarke (174), Phinney (125), Craddock (102), Carthy (92), Moreno (86), Breschel (70), Brown (50), Langeveld (41), Van Asbroeck (21), Canty (20), van den Berg (20), McLay (20), Howes (10), Scully (5), Dombrowski (5), Magnusson (1)
17	Team Katusha–Alpecin	2757	23 riders Haas (508), Zakarin (462), Špilak (271), Politt (255), Gonçalves (199), Kittel (185), Lammertink (154), Fabbro (92), T. Martin (91), Kuznetsov (90), Hollenstein (66), Cras (55), Restrepo (53), Würtz Schmidt (51), Kochetkov (50), Kišerlovski (40), Planckaert (36), Boswell (30), Machado (18), Dowsett (18), Zabel (15), Biermans (15), Smit (3)
18	Team Dimension Data	2017 (Note: Listed by UCI on 1953 points, missing Igor Antón's points from the Tour of the Basque Country, the Clásica de San Sebastián and the Vuelta a España.)	22 riders Boasson Hagen (497), Slagter (462), King (258), O'Connor (112), Pauwels (88), Vermote (87), Berhane (76), Kudus (67), Antón (64), Gebrezgabihier (59), Meintjes (50), Thwaites (49), Cavendish (35), Davies (31), R. Janse van Rensburg (28), Morton (21), Thomson (13), Gibbons (9), Dlamini (6), Eisel (2), Debesay (2), Dougall (1)

== Leader progress ==
Event (Winner)	Individual	Team
Tour Down Under (Daryl Impey)	Daryl Impey	Mitchelton–Scott
Cadel Evans Great Ocean Road Race (Jay McCarthy)	Daryl Impey	Mitchelton–Scott
Omloop Het Nieuwsblad (Michael Valgren)	Daryl Impey	Mitchelton–Scott
Abu Dhabi Tour (Alejandro Valverde)	Daryl Impey	Quick-Step Floors
Strade Bianche (Tiesj Benoot)	Daryl Impey	Quick-Step Floors
Paris–Nice (Marc Soler)	Daryl Impey	Mitchelton–Scott
Tirreno–Adriatico (Michał Kwiatkowski)	Daryl Impey	Mitchelton–Scott
Milan–San Remo (Vincenzo Nibali)	Daryl Impey	Mitchelton–Scott
E3 Harelbeke (Niki Terpstra)	Daryl Impey	Mitchelton–Scott
Volta a Catalunya (Alejandro Valverde)	Alejandro Valverde	Mitchelton–Scott
Gent–Wevelgem (Peter Sagan)	Alejandro Valverde	Quick-Step Floors
Dwars door Vlaanderen (Yves Lampaert)	Alejandro Valverde	Quick-Step Floors
Tour of Flanders (Niki Terpstra)	Peter Sagan	Quick-Step Floors
Tour of the Basque Country (Primož Roglič)	Peter Sagan	Quick-Step Floors
Paris–Roubaix (Peter Sagan)	Peter Sagan	Quick-Step Floors
Amstel Gold Race (Michael Valgren)	Peter Sagan	Quick-Step Floors
La Flèche Wallonne (Julian Alaphilippe)	Peter Sagan	Quick-Step Floors
Liège–Bastogne–Liège (Bob Jungels)	Peter Sagan	Quick-Step Floors
Tour de Romandie (Primož Roglič)	Peter Sagan	Quick-Step Floors
Eschborn–Frankfurt (Alexander Kristoff)	Peter Sagan	Quick-Step Floors
Tour of California (Egan Bernal)	Peter Sagan	Quick-Step Floors
Giro d'Italia (Chris Froome)	Peter Sagan	Quick-Step Floors
Critérium du Dauphiné (Geraint Thomas)	Peter Sagan	Quick-Step Floors
Tour de Suisse (Richie Porte)	Peter Sagan	Quick-Step Floors
RideLondon–Surrey Classic (Pascal Ackermann)	Peter Sagan	Quick-Step Floors
Tour de France (Geraint Thomas)	Peter Sagan	Quick-Step Floors
Clásica de San Sebastián (Julian Alaphilippe)	Peter Sagan	Quick-Step Floors
Tour de Pologne (Michał Kwiatkowski)	Peter Sagan	Quick-Step Floors
EuroEyes Cyclassics (Elia Viviani)	Peter Sagan	Quick-Step Floors
BinckBank Tour (Matej Mohorič)	Peter Sagan	Quick-Step Floors
Bretagne Classic Ouest–France (Oliver Naesen)	Peter Sagan	Quick-Step Floors
Grand Prix Cycliste de Québec (Michael Matthews)	Peter Sagan	Quick-Step Floors
Grand Prix Cycliste de Montréal (Michael Matthews)	Peter Sagan	Quick-Step Floors
Vuelta a España (Simon Yates)	Simon Yates	Quick-Step Floors
Il Lombardia (Thibaut Pinot)	Simon Yates	Quick-Step Floors
Presidential Tour of Turkey (Eduard Prades)	Simon Yates	Quick-Step Floors
Tour of Guangxi (Gianni Moscon)	Simon Yates	Quick-Step Floors
