= 2018 Trek–Segafredo season =

Trek-Segafredo
- 2018 season
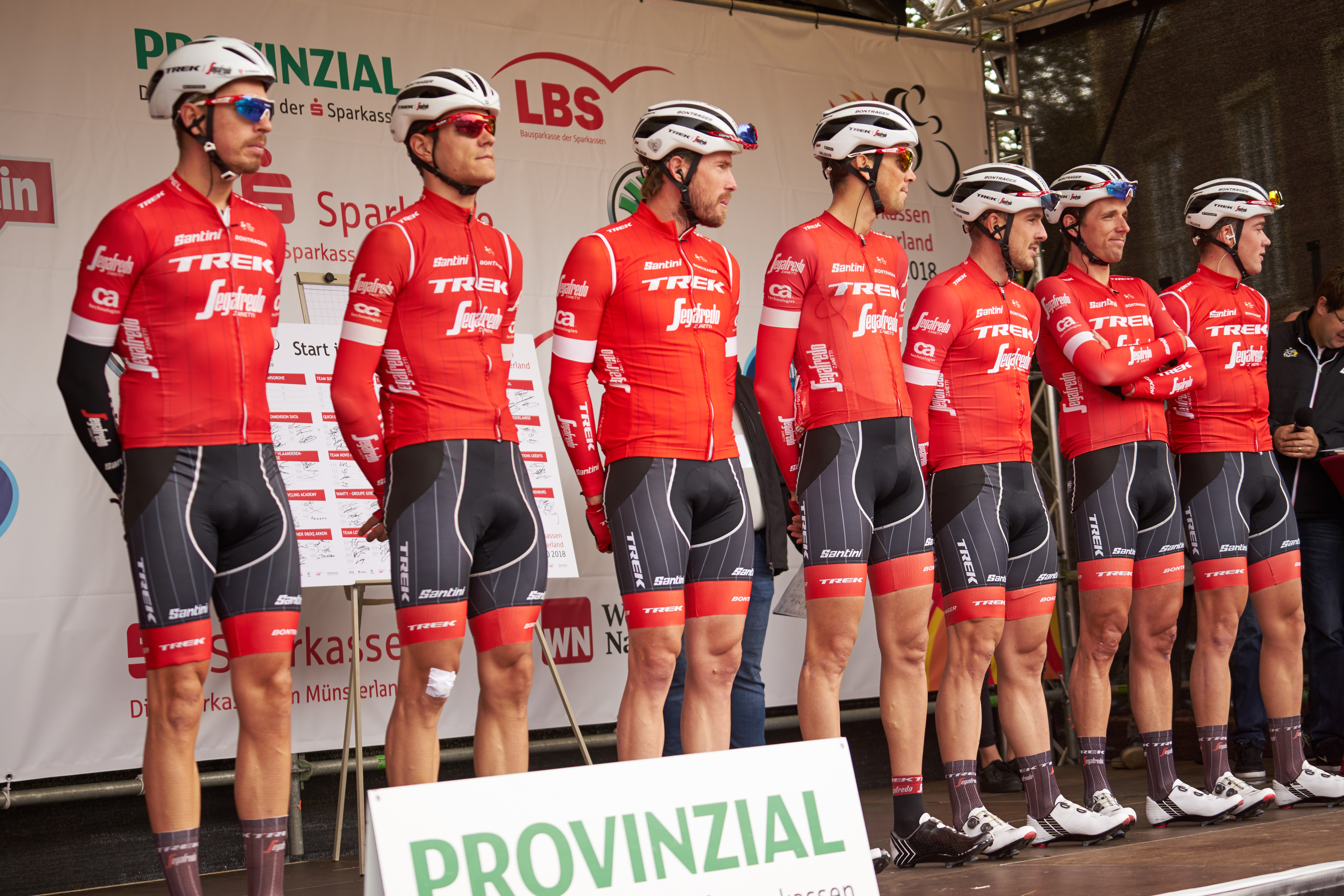
- Trek-Segafredo on 2018 Münsterland Giro
- UCI code: TFS
- Status: UCI WorldTeam
- Manager: Luca Guercilena
- Main sponsor(s): Trek
- Based: United States
- Bicycles: Trek
- Groupset: Shimano

Season victories
- One-day races: 9
- Stage race stages: 8
- National Championships: 3
- Most wins: Jasper Stuyven, John Degenkolb, Toms Skujiņš (3)
- Best ranked rider: Jasper Stuyven (16th)
- Jersey

The 2018 cycling season began in Australia at the Tour Down Under for Trek-Segafredo in January.

As a UCI WorldTeam, they are automatically invited and obliged to send a squad to every event in the UCI World Tour.

== 2018 roster ==
As of May 19, 2018.

Rider	Date of birth
Eugenio Alafaci (ITA)	August 9, 1990 (age 34)
Fumiyuki Beppu (JPN)	April 10, 1983 (age 41)
Julien Bernard (FRA)	March 17, 1992 (age 33)
Gianluca Brambilla (ITA)	August 22, 1987 (age 37)
Matthias Brändle (AUT)	December 7, 1989 (age 35)
Nicola Conci (ITA)	January 5, 1997 (age 28)
Gregory Daniel (USA)	November 8, 1994 (age 30)
Koen de Kort (NED)	September 8, 1982 (age 42)
John Degenkolb (GER)	January 7, 1989 (age 36)
Laurent Didier (LUX)	July 19, 1984 (age 40)
Niklas Eg (DNK)	January 6, 1995 (age 30)
Fabio Felline (ITA)	March 29, 1990 (age 34)
Alex Frame (NZL)	June 18, 1993 (age 31)
Michael Gogl (AUT)	November 4, 1993 (age 31)

Rider	Date of birth
Tsgabu Grmay (ETH)	August 25, 1991 (age 33)
Ruben Guerreiro (POR)	July 6, 1994 (age 30)
Markel Irizar (ESP)	February 5, 1980 (age 45)
Bauke Mollema (NED)	November 26, 1986 (age 38)
Ryan Mullen (IRE)	August 7, 1994 (age 30)
Giacomo Nizzolo (ITA)	January 30, 1989 (age 36)
Jarlinson Pantano (COL)	November 19, 1988 (age 36)
Mads Pedersen (DEN)	December 18, 1995 (age 29)
Grégory Rast (SUI)	January 17, 1980 (age 45)
Kiel Reijnen (USA)	June 1, 1986 (age 38)
Toms Skujiņš (LAT)	June 15, 1991 (age 33)
Peter Stetina (USA)	August 8, 1987 (age 37)
Jasper Stuyven (BEL)	April 17, 1992 (age 32)
Boy van Poppel (NED)	January 18, 1988 (age 37)

Riders who joined the team for the 2018 season

Rider	2017 team
Gianluca Brambilla	Quick-Step Floors
Nicola Conci	neo-pro
Niklas Eg	Team TreFor
Alex Frame	JLT–Condor
Tsgabu Grmay	Bahrain–Merida
Ryan Mullen	Cannondale–Drapac
Toms Skujiņš	Cannondale–Drapac

Riders who left the team during or after the 2017 season

Rider	2018 team
André Cardoso	Suspended
Marco Coledan	Wilier Triestina–Selle Italia
Alberto Contador	Retired
Jesús Hernández	Retired
Edward Theuns	Team Sunweb
Haimar Zubeldia	Retired

== Season victories ==
Date	Race	Competition	Rider	Country	Location
24 January	Vuelta a San Juan, Stage 3 (ITT)	UCI America Tour	Ryan Mullen (IRL)	Argentina	San Juan
25 January	Trofeo Porreres-Felanitx-Ses Salines-Campos	UCI Europe Tour	John Degenkolb (GER)	Spain	Ses Salines
27 January	Trofeo Andratx – Mirador d'Es Colomer	UCI Europe Tour	Toms Skujiņš (LAT)	Spain	Andratx
28 January	Vuelta a San Juan, Stage 7	UCI America Tour	Giacomo Nizzolo (ITA)	Argentina	San Juan
28 January	Trofeo Playa de Palma	UCI Europe Tour	John Degenkolb (GER)	Spain	Palma
2 February	Herald Sun Tour, Stage 2	UCI Oceania Tour	Mads Pedersen (DEN)	Australia	Ballarat
23 March	Volta a Catalunya, Stage 5	UCI World Tour	Jarlinson Pantano (COL)	Spain	Vielha-Val d'Aran
23 March	Settimana Internazionale di Coppi e Bartali, Stage 2	UCI Europe Tour	Bauke Mollema (NED)	Italy	Sogliano al Rubicone
15 May	Tour of California, Stage 3	UCI World Tour	Toms Skujiņš (LAT)	United States	WeatherTech Raceway Laguna Seca
19 May	Tour of California, Mountains classification	UCI World Tour	Toms Skujiņš (LAT)	United States	
16 June	Fyen Rundt	UCI Europe Tour	Mads Pedersen (DEN)	Denmark	Odense
15 July	Tour de France, Stage 9	UCI World Tour	John Degenkolb (GER)	France	Roubaix
16 August	BinckBank Tour, Stage 4	UCI World Tour	Jasper Stuyven (BEL)	Belgium	Ardooie
12 September	Grand Prix de Wallonie	UCI Europe Tour	Jasper Stuyven (BEL)	Belgium	Namur
16 September	Grote Prijs Jef Scherens	UCI Europe Tour	Jasper Stuyven (BEL)	Belgium	Leuven
22 September	Tour de l'Eurométropole	UCI Europe Tour	Mads Pedersen (DEN)	Belgium	Tournai
7 October	Gran Premio Bruno Beghelli	UCI Europe Tour	Bauke Mollema (NED)	Italy	Monteveglio
9 October	Tre Valli Varesine	UCI Europe Tour	Toms Skujiņš (LAT)	Italy	Varese

== National, Continental and World Champions 2018 ==
Date	Discipline	Jersey	Rider	Country	Location
25 June	Ethiopian National Time Trial Champion		Tsgabu Grmay (ETH)	Ethiopia	Mekele
28 June	Irish National Time Trial Champion		Ryan Mullen (IRL)	Ireland	Collooney
28 June	Latvian National Time Trial Champion		Toms Skujiņš (LAT)	Latvia	Riga
