= 2018 Team Sunweb (men's team) season =

Team Sunweb
- 2018 season
- UCI code: SUN
- Status: UCI WorldTeam
- Manager: Iwan Spekenbrink
- Main sponsor(s): Sunweb
- Based: Germany
- Bicycles: Giant
- Groupset: Shimano

Season victories
- One-day races: 4
- Stage race stages: 7

The 2018 season for Team Sunweb began in January with the Tour Down Under. As a UCI WorldTeam, they were automatically invited and obligated to send a squad to every event in the UCI World Tour.

== Team roster ==
As of 31 March 2018.

Rider	Date of birth
Nikias Arndt (GER)	18 November 1991 (aged 26)
Phil Bauhaus (GER)	8 July 1994 (aged 23)
Roy Curvers (NED)	27 December 1979 (aged 38)
Tom Dumoulin (NED)	11 November 1990 (aged 27)
Johannes Fröhlinger (GER)	9 June 1985 (aged 32)
Simon Geschke (GER)	13 March 1986 (aged 32)
Chad Haga (USA)	26 August 1988 (aged 29)
Chris Hamilton (AUS)	18 May 1995 (aged 22)
Jai Hindley (AUS)	5 May 1996 (aged 21)
Lennard Hofstede (NED)	29 December 1994 (aged 23)
Lennard Kämna (GER)	9 September 1996 (aged 21)
Wilco Kelderman (NED)	25 March 1991 (aged 27)

Rider	Date of birth
Søren Kragh Andersen (DNK)	10 August 1994 (aged 23)
Michael Matthews (AUS)	26 September 1990 (aged 27)
Sam Oomen (NED)	15 August 1995 (aged 22)
Tom Stamsnijder (NED)	15 May 1985 (aged 32)
Michael Storer (AUS)	28 February 1997 (aged 21)
Laurens ten Dam (NED)	13 November 1980 (aged 37)
Mike Teunissen (NED)	25 August 1992 (aged 25)
Edward Theuns (BEL)	30 April 1991 (aged 26)
Martijn Tusveld (NED)	9 September 1993 (aged 24)
Louis Vervaeke (BEL)	6 October 1993 (aged 24)
Max Walscheid (GER)	13 June 1993 (aged 24)

Riders who joined the team for the 2018 season

Rider	2017 team
Jai Hindley	Mitchelton Scott
Michael Storer	Mitchelton Scott
Edward Theuns	Trek–Segafredo
Martijn Tusveld	Roompot–Nederlandse Loterij
Louis Vervaeke	Lotto–Soudal

Riders who left the team during or after the 2017 season

Rider	2018 team
Warren Barguil	Fortuneo–Samsic
Bert de Backer	Vital Concept
Sindre Skjøstad Lunke	Fortuneo–Samsic
Georg Preidler	FDJ
Ramon Sinkeldam	FDJ
Albert Timmer	Retired
Zico Waeytens	Vérandas Willems–Crelan

== Season victories ==
Date	Race	Competition	Rider	Country	Location
23 February	Abu Dhabi Tour, Stage 3	UCI World Tour	Phil Bauhaus (GER)	United Arab Emirates	
24 April	Tour de Romandie, Prologue	UCI World Tour	Michael Matthews (AUS)	Switzerland	Fribourg
4 May	Giro d'Italia, Stage 1 (ITT)	UCI World Tour	Tom Dumoulin (NED)	Israel	Jerusalem
5 May	Tour de Yorkshire, Stage 3	UCI Europe Tour	Max Walscheid (GER)	United Kingdom	Scarborough
14 June	Tour de Suisse, Stage 6	UCI World Tour	Søren Kragh Andersen (DEN)	Switzerland	Gommiswald
28 July	Tour de France, Stage 20 (ITT)	UCI World Tour	Tom Dumoulin (NED)	France	Espelette
19 August	BinckBank Tour, Stage 7	UCI World Tour	Michael Matthews (AUS)	Belgium	Geraardsbergen
7 September	Grand Prix Cycliste de Québec	UCI World Tour	Michael Matthews (AUS)	Canada	
9 September	Grand Prix Cycliste de Montréal	UCI World Tour	Michael Matthews (AUS)	Canada	
3 October	Münsterland Giro	UCI Europe Tour	Max Walscheid (GER)	Germany	
7 October	Paris–Tours	UCI Europe Tour	Søren Kragh Andersen (DEN)	France	

== National, Continental and World champions 2018 ==
Date	Discipline	Jersey	Rider	Country	Location
