= 2018 EuroEyes Cyclassics =

Cycling race

EuroEyes Cyclassics
2018 UCI World Tour, race 30 of 37

Race details
- Dates: 19 August 2018
- Stages: 1
- Distance: 212.8 km (132.2 mi)
- Winning time: 4h 46' 02"

Results
	Winner	Elia Viviani (ITA)	(Quick-Step Floors)
	Second	Arnaud Démare (FRA)	(Groupama–FDJ)
	Third	Alexander Kristoff (NOR)	(UAE Team Emirates)

The 2018 EuroEyes Cyclassics was a road cycling one-day race that took place on 19 August 2018 in Germany. It was the 23rd edition of the EuroEyes Cyclassics and the thirtieth event of the 2018 UCI World Tour. It was won for a second consecutive time by Elia Viviani in a sprint before Arnaud Démare and Alexander Kristoff.

== Result ==
Result
Rank	Rider	Team	Time
1	Elia Viviani (ITA)	Quick-Step Floors	4h 46' 02"
2	Arnaud Démare (FRA)	Groupama–FDJ	+ 0"
3	Alexander Kristoff (NOR)	UAE Team Emirates	+ 0"
4	John Degenkolb (GER)	Trek–Segafredo	+ 0"
5	Matteo Trentin (ITA)	Mitchelton–Scott	+ 0"
6	Giacomo Nizzolo (ITA)	Trek–Segafredo	+ 0"
7	Sacha Modolo (ITA)	EF Education First–Drapac p/b Cannondale	+ 0"
8	Nikias Arndt (GER)	Team Sunweb	+ 0"
9	Niccolò Bonifazio (ITA)	Bahrain–Merida	+ 0"
10	Peter Sagan (SVK)	Bora–Hansgrohe	+ 0"
