= 2018 E3 Harelbeke =

Cycling race

2018 UCI World Tour, race 10 of 37

Race details
- Dates: 23 March 2018
- Stages: 1
- Distance: 206.1 km (128.1 mi)
- Winning time: 5h 03' 34"

Results
	Winner	Niki Terpstra (NED)	(Quick-Step Floors)
	Second	Philippe Gilbert (BEL)	(Quick-Step Floors)
	Third	Greg Van Avermaet (BEL)	(BMC Racing Team)

The 2018 E3 Harelbeke was a road cycling one-day race that took place on 23 March 2018 in Belgium. It was the 61st edition of the E3 Harelbeke and the tenth event of the 2018 UCI World Tour. The race was won by Niki Terpstra (Quick-Step Floors), who stayed 20 seconds clear of an elite group, led home by his teammate Philippe Gilbert, with BMC Racing Team's Greg Van Avermaet completing the podium.

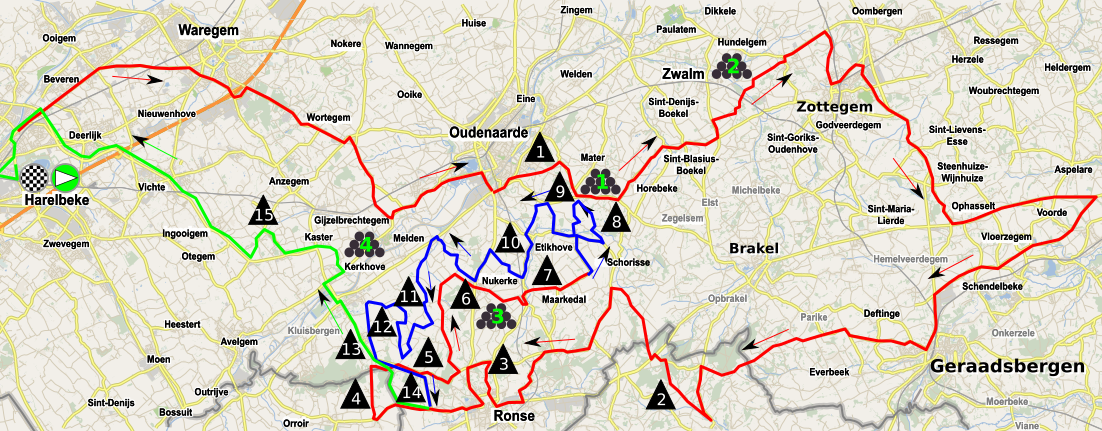
The complete course of the race

== Teams ==
As E3 Harelbeke was a UCI World Tour event, all eighteen UCI WorldTeams were invited automatically and obliged to enter a team in the race. Seven UCI Professional Continental teams competed, completing the 25-team peloton.

UCI WorldTeams

- AG2R La Mondiale
- Astana
- Bahrain–Merida
- BMC Racing Team
- Bora–Hansgrohe
- EF Education First–Drapac p/b Cannondale
- Team Dimension Data
- Team Katusha–Alpecin
- LottoNL–Jumbo
- Lotto–Soudal
- Movistar Team
- Mitchelton–Scott
- Quick-Step Floors
- Team Sky
- Team Sunweb
- Trek–Segafredo
- UAE Team Emirates
- Groupama–FDJ

UCI Professional Continental teams

- Direct Énergie
- Roompot–Nederlandse Loterij
- Sport Vlaanderen–Baloise
- Vérandas Willems–Crelan
- Vital Concept
- Wanty–Groupe Gobert
- WB Aqua Protect Veranclassic

== Results ==
Result
Rank	Rider	Team	Time
1	Niki Terpstra (NED)	Quick-Step Floors	5h 03' 34"
2	Philippe Gilbert (BEL)	Quick-Step Floors	+ 20"
3	Greg Van Avermaet (BEL)	BMC Racing Team	+ 20"
4	Oliver Naesen (BEL)	AG2R La Mondiale	+ 20"
5	Tiesj Benoot (BEL)	Lotto–Soudal	+ 20"
6	Jasper Stuyven (BEL)	Trek–Segafredo	+ 20"
7	Sep Vanmarcke (BEL)	EF Education First–Drapac p/b Cannondale	+ 20"
8	Gianni Moscon (ITA)	Team Sky	+ 20"
9	Zdeněk Štybar (CZE)	Quick-Step Floors	+ 20"
10	Stefan Küng (SUI)	BMC Racing Team	+ 20"
