= 2018 EF Education First–Drapac season =

EF Education First–Drapac p/b Cannondale
- 2018 season
- UCI code: EFD
- Status: UCI WorldTeam
- Manager: Jonathan Vaughters
- Main sponsor(s): Cannondale
- Based: Boulder, Colorado, United States
- Bicycles: Cannondale
- Groupset: Shimano

Season victories
- Stage race stages: 6
- Most wins: Rigoberto Urán (2)
- Best ranked rider: Michael Woods (38th)
- Jersey

The 2018 season for the EF Education First–Drapac p/b Cannondale cycling team began in January at the Tour Down Under. As a UCI WorldTeam, they are obligated to send a squad to every event in the UCI World Tour.

== Team roster ==
As of March 31, 2018.

Rider	Date of birth
Matti Breschel (DEN)	August 31, 1984 (aged 33)
Nathan Brown (USA)	July 7, 1991 (aged 26)
Brendan Canty (AUS)	January 17, 1992 (aged 26)
Julián Cardona (COL)	January 19, 1997 (aged 21)
Hugh Carthy (GBR)	July 9, 1994 (aged 23)
Simon Clarke (AUS)	July 18, 1986 (aged 31)
Will Clarke (AUS)	April 11, 1985 (aged 32)
Lawson Craddock (USA)	February 20, 1992 (aged 26)
Mitchell Docker (AUS)	October 2, 1986 (aged 31)
Joe Dombrowski (USA)	May 12, 1991 (aged 26)
Alex Howes (USA)	January 1, 1988 (aged 30)
Sebastian Langeveld (NED)	January 17, 1985 (aged 33)
Kim Magnusson (SWE)	August 31, 1992 (aged 25)

Rider	Date of birth
Daniel Martínez (COL)	April 25, 1996 (aged 21)
Daniel McLay (GBR)	January 3, 1992 (aged 26)
Sacha Modolo (ITA)	June 19, 1987 (aged 30)
Daniel Moreno (ESP)	September 5, 1981 (aged 36)
Logan Owen (USA)	March 23, 1995 (aged 23)
Taylor Phinney (USA)	June 27, 1990 (aged 27)
Pierre Rolland (FRA)	October 10, 1986 (aged 31)
Tom Scully (NZL)	January 14, 1990 (aged 28)
Rigoberto Urán (COL)	January 26, 1987 (aged 31)
Tom Van Asbroeck (BEL)	April 19, 1990 (aged 27)
Sep Vanmarcke (BEL)	July 28, 1988 (aged 29)
Michael Woods (CAN)	October 12, 1986 (aged 31)

Riders who joined the team for the 2018 season

Rider	2017 team
Matti Breschel	Astana
Julián Cardona	Medellín–Inder
Mitchell Docker	Orica–Scott
Kim Magnusson	Team Tre Berg–PostNord
Daniel Martínez	Wilier Triestina–Selle Italia
Daniel McLay	Fortuneo–Oscaro
Sacha Modolo	UAE Team Emirates
Daniel Moreno	Movistar Team
Logan Owen	Axeon–Hagens Berman

Riders who left the team during or after the 2017 season

Rider	2018 team
Alberto Bettiol	BMC Racing Team
Patrick Bevin	BMC Racing Team
Davide Formolo	Bora–Hansgrohe
Kristijan Koren	Bahrain–Merida
Ryan Mullen	Trek–Segafredo
Toms Skujiņš	Trek–Segafredo
Tom-Jelte Slagter	Team Dimension Data
Andrew Talansky	Retired
Dylan van Baarle	Team Sky
Davide Villella	Astana
Wouter Wippert	Roompot–Nederlandse Loterij

== Season victories ==
Date	Race	Competition	Rider	Country	Location
10 February	Colombia Oro y Paz, Stage 5	UCI America Tour	Rigoberto Urán (COL)	Colombia	Salento
16 February	Vuelta a Andalucía, Stage 3	UCI Europe Tour	Sacha Modolo (ITA)	Spain	Herrera
6 April	Circuit de la Sarthe, Stage 4	UCI Europe Tour	Daniel McLay (GBR)	France	Sablé
15 June	Tour of Slovenia, Stage 3	UCI Europe Tour	Rigoberto Urán (COL)	Slovenia	Celje
29 August	Vuelta a España, Stage 5	UCI World Tour	Simon Clarke (AUS)	Spain	Roquetas de Mar
12 September	Vuelta a España, Stage 17	UCI World Tour	Michael Woods (CAN)	Spain	Biscay

== National, Continental and World champions ==
Date	Discipline	Jersey	Rider	Country	Location
