= 2018 Cadel Evans Great Ocean Road Race =

Cycling race

2018 UCI World Tour, race 2 of 37

Race details
- Dates: 28 January 2018
- Stages: 1
- Distance: 164 km (102 mi)
- Winning time: 4h 04' 00"

Results
	Winner	Jay McCarthy (AUS)	(Bora–Hansgrohe)
	Second	Elia Viviani (ITA)	(Quick-Step Floors)
	Third	Daryl Impey (RSA)	(Mitchelton–Scott)

The 2018 Cadel Evans Great Ocean Road Race was a road cycling one-day race that took place on 28 January 2018 in Australia. It was the fourth edition of the Cadel Evans Great Ocean Road Race and the second event of the 2018 UCI World Tour.

Australian rider Jay McCarthy (Bora–Hansgrohe) led home a 24-rider select group at the finish to take the victory, ahead of Italy's Elia Viviani from the Quick-Step Floors team in second position, while South Africa's Daryl Impey, the World Tour ranking leader, completed the podium for Mitchelton–Scott.

== Teams ==
As the race was only added to the UCI World Tour calendar in 2017, all UCI WorldTeams were invited to the race, but not obligated to compete in the race. As such, twelve of the eighteen WorldTeams competed in the race, down one on 2017. Three UCI Professional Continental teams competed – also one fewer than 2017 – while an Australian national squad completed the 16-team peloton.

UCI WorldTeams

- AG2R La Mondiale
- BMC Racing Team
- Bora–Hansgrohe
- Team Dimension Data
- Team Katusha–Alpecin
- LottoNL–Jumbo
- Lotto–Soudal
- Mitchelton–Scott
- Quick-Step Floors
- Team Sky
- Team Sunweb
- Trek–Segafredo

Wildcard teams

- Aqua Blue Sport
- Israel Cycling Academy
- Roompot–Nederlandse Loterij
- Australia (national team)

== Result ==
Result
Rank	Rider	Team	Time
1	Jay McCarthy (AUS)	Bora–Hansgrohe	4h 04' 00"
2	Elia Viviani (ITA)	Quick-Step Floors	+ 0"
3	Daryl Impey (RSA)	Mitchelton–Scott	+ 0"
4	Dries Devenyns (BEL)	Quick-Step Floors	+ 0"
5	Simon Gerrans (AUS)	BMC Racing Team	+ 0"
6	Nikias Arndt (GER)	Team Sunweb	+ 0"
7	Steele Von Hoff (AUS)	Australia (national team)	+ 0"
8	Maurits Lammertink (NED)	Team Katusha–Alpecin	+ 0"
9	Enrico Battaglin (ITA)	LottoNL–Jumbo	+ 0"
10	Lars Bak (DEN)	Lotto–Soudal	+ 0"
