= 2018 Strade Bianche =

Cycling race

2018 UCI World Tour, race 5 of 37
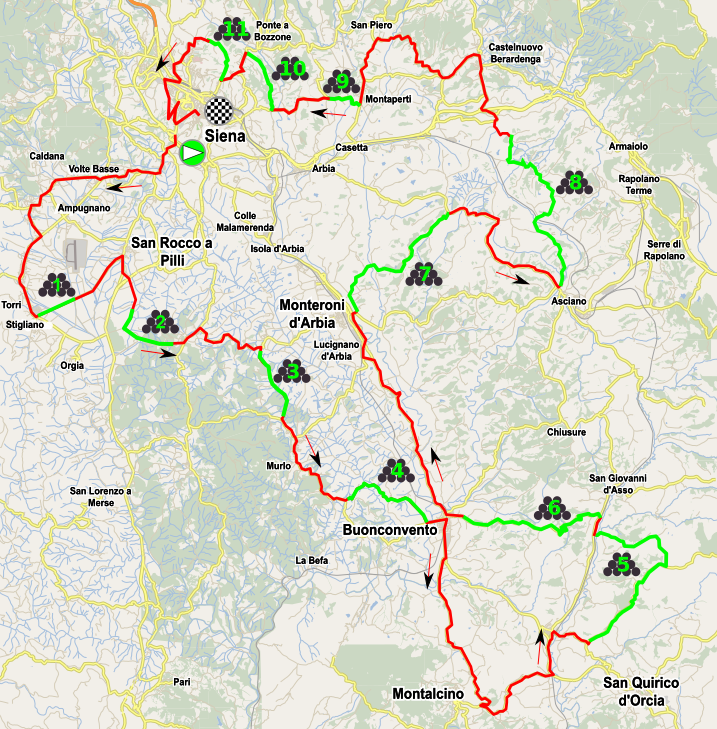

Race details
- Dates: 3 March 2018
- Stages: 1
- Distance: 184 km (114.3 mi)
- Winning time: 5h 03' 33"

Results
	Winner	Tiesj Benoot (BEL)	(Lotto–Soudal)
	Second	Romain Bardet (FRA)	(AG2R La Mondiale)
	Third	Wout van Aert (BEL)	(Vérandas Willems–Crelan)

The 2018 Strade Bianche was a road cycling one-day race that took place on 3 March 2018 in Italy. It was the twelfth edition of the Strade Bianche and the fifth event of the 2018 UCI World Tour.

Tiesj Benoot (Lotto–Soudal) took his first professional victory, after attacking from a chasing group to catch leaders Romain Bardet (AG2R La Mondiale) and Wout van Aert (Vérandas Willems–Crelan) before dropping them in the final sector of dirt roads. Benoot soloed to victory by 39 seconds ahead of Bardet, who dropped van Aert in the final kilometre; van Aert, a three-time world elite cyclo-cross champion, ultimately completed the podium a further 19 seconds in arrears.

== Teams ==
As the race was only added to the UCI World Tour calendar in 2017, all UCI WorldTeams were invited to the race, but not obligated to compete in the race. As it transpired, all eighteen WorldTeams elected to compete in the race, just like in 2017. Three UCI Professional Continental teams competed, completing the 21-team peloton.

Strade Bianche is the final race for FDJ under that nomenclature; from Paris–Nice the following day, the team becomes known as Groupama–FDJ.

UCI WorldTeams

- AG2R La Mondiale
- Astana
- Bahrain–Merida
- BMC Racing Team
- Bora–Hansgrohe
- EF Education First–Drapac p/b Cannondale
- Team Dimension Data
- Team Katusha–Alpecin
- LottoNL–Jumbo
- Lotto–Soudal
- Mitchelton–Scott
- Movistar Team
- Quick-Step Floors
- Team Sky
- Team Sunweb
- Trek–Segafredo
- UAE Team Emirates
- FDJ

UCI Professional Continental teams

- Androni Giocattoli–Sidermec
- Nippo–Vini Fantini–Europa Ovini
- Vérandas Willems–Crelan

== Result ==
Result
Rank	Rider	Team	Time
1	Tiesj Benoot (BEL)	Lotto–Soudal	5h 03' 33"
2	Romain Bardet (FRA)	AG2R La Mondiale	+ 39"
3	Wout van Aert (BEL)	Vérandas Willems–Crelan	+ 58"
4	Alejandro Valverde (ESP)	Movistar Team	+ 1' 25"
5	Giovanni Visconti (ITA)	Bahrain–Merida	+ 1' 27"
6	Robert Power (AUS)	Mitchelton–Scott	+ 1' 29"
7	Zdeněk Štybar (CZE)	Quick-Step Floors	+ 1' 42"
8	Peter Sagan (SVK)	Bora–Hansgrohe	+ 2' 08"
9	Pieter Serry (BEL)	Quick-Step Floors	+ 2' 11"
10	Gregor Mühlberger (AUT)	Bora–Hansgrohe	+ 2' 16"
