= 2018 Il Lombardia =

Cycling race

2018 UCI World Tour, race 36 of 37
- Official event poster

Race details
- Dates: 13 October 2018
- Stages: 1
- Distance: 241 km (149.8 mi)
- Winning time: 5h 53' 22"

Results
	Winner	Thibaut Pinot (FRA)	(Groupama–FDJ)
	Second	Vincenzo Nibali (ITA)	(Bahrain–Merida)
	Third	Dylan Teuns (BEL)	(BMC Racing Team)

The 2018 Il Lombardia is a road cycling one-day race that took place on 13 October 2018 in Italy. It was the 112th edition of the Il Lombardia and the 36th event of the 2018 UCI World Tour. It was won solo by Thibaut Pinot, ahead of Vincenzo Nibali and Dylan Teuns. Pinot rode with a high tempo starting from the Civiglio climb 15 kilometers from the finish line and the other three riders in the lead group at that time (Egan Bernal, Vincenzo Nibali and Primož Roglič) lost ground to him.

== Results ==
Result
Rank	Rider	Team	Time
1	Thibaut Pinot (FRA)	Groupama–FDJ	5h 53' 22"
2	Vincenzo Nibali (ITA)	Bahrain–Merida	+ 32"
3	Dylan Teuns (BEL)	BMC Racing Team	+ 43"
4	Rigoberto Urán (COL)	EF Education First–Drapac p/b Cannondale	+ 43"
5	Tim Wellens (BEL)	Lotto–Soudal	+ 43"
6	Ion Izagirre (ESP)	Bahrain–Merida	+ 43"
7	Rafał Majka (POL)	Bora–Hansgrohe	+ 43"
8	Domenico Pozzovivo (ITA)	Bahrain–Merida	+ 43"
9	Dan Martin (IRL)	UAE Team Emirates	+ 48"
10	George Bennett (NZ)	LottoNL–Jumbo	+ 1' 22"
