= 2018 Gent–Wevelgem =

Cycling race

2018 UCI World Tour, race 11 of 37
- Event poster with previous winner Greg van Avermaet

Race details
- Dates: 25 March 2018
- Stages: 1
- Distance: 250.8 km (155.8 mi)
- Winning time: 5h 53' 37"

Results
	Winner	Peter Sagan (SVK)	(Bora–Hansgrohe)
	Second	Elia Viviani (ITA)	(Quick-Step Floors)
	Third	Arnaud Démare (FRA)	(Groupama–FDJ)

The 2018 Gent–Wevelgem – In Flanders Fields was a road cycling one-day race that took place on 25 March 2018 in Belgium. It was held over a distance of 250.8 kilometres from Deinze to Wevelgem and was the 80th edition of Gent–Wevelgem and the eleventh event of the 2018 UCI World Tour. The winner was Peter Sagan of the Bora–Hansgrohe team.

The race was won for a record-equalling third time by Bora–Hansgrohe's Peter Sagan in a sprint finish of some 20 riders, ahead of Quick-Step Floors rider Elia Viviani and Arnaud Démare, riding for Groupama–FDJ.

The route of the 2018 Gent–Wevelgem

== Teams ==
As Gent–Wevelgem was a UCI World Tour event, all eighteen UCI WorldTeams were invited automatically and obliged to enter a team in the race. Seven UCI Professional Continental teams competed, completing the 25-team peloton.

UCI WorldTeams

- AG2R La Mondiale
- Astana
- Bahrain–Merida
- BMC Racing Team
- Bora–Hansgrohe
- EF Education First–Drapac p/b Cannondale
- Team Dimension Data
- Team Katusha–Alpecin
- LottoNL–Jumbo
- Lotto–Soudal
- Movistar Team
- Mitchelton–Scott
- Quick-Step Floors
- Team Sky
- Team Sunweb
- Trek–Segafredo
- UAE Team Emirates
- Groupama–FDJ

UCI Professional Continental teams

- Cofidis
- Roompot–Nederlandse Loterij
- Sport Vlaanderen–Baloise
- Vérandas Willems–Crelan
- Vital Concept
- Wanty–Groupe Gobert
- WB Aqua Protect Veranclassic

== Result ==
Result
Rank	Rider	Team	Time
1	Peter Sagan (SVK)	Bora–Hansgrohe	5h 53' 37"
2	Elia Viviani (ITA)	Quick-Step Floors	+ 0"
3	Arnaud Démare (FRA)	Groupama–FDJ	+ 0"
4	Christophe Laporte (FRA)	Cofidis	+ 0"
5	Jens Debusschere (BEL)	Lotto–Soudal	+ 0"
6	Oliver Naesen (BEL)	AG2R La Mondiale	+ 0"
7	Matteo Trentin (ITA)	Mitchelton–Scott	+ 0"
8	Zdeněk Štybar (CZE)	Quick-Step Floors	+ 0"
9	Jasper Stuyven (BEL)	Trek–Segafredo	+ 0"
10	Wout van Aert (BEL)	Vérandas Willems–Crelan	+ 0"
