= 2018 Bretagne Classic Ouest-France =

Cycling race

Bretagne Classic Ouest–France
2018 UCI World Tour, race 32 of 37

Race details
- Dates: 26 August 2018
- Stages: 1
- Distance: 256.9 km (159.6 mi)
- Winning time: 6h 16' 32"

Results
	Winner	Oliver Naesen (BEL)	(AG2R La Mondiale)
	Second	Michael Valgren (DEN)	(Astana)
	Third	Tim Wellens (BEL)	(Lotto–Soudal)

The 2018 Bretagne Classic Ouest–France was a road cycling one-day race that took place on 26 August 2018 in France. It was the 82nd edition of the Bretagne Classic Ouest–France and the 32nd event of the 2018 UCI World Tour. It was won for a second time by Oliver Naesen, winning the sprint ahead of Michael Valgren and Tim Wellens.

== Result ==
Result
Rank	Rider	Team	Time
1	Oliver Naesen (BEL)	AG2R La Mondiale	6h 16' 34"
2	Michael Valgren (DEN)	Astana	+ 0"
3	Tim Wellens (BEL)	Lotto–Soudal	+ 3"
4	Michael Matthews (AUS)	Team Sunweb	+ 1'13"
5	Ruben Guerreiro (POR)	Trek–Segafredo	+ 1'13"
6	Zdeněk Štybar (CZE)	Quick-Step Floors	+ 1'13"
7	Olivier Le Gac (FRA)	Groupama–FDJ	+ 1'15"
8	Valentin Madouas (FRA)	Groupama–FDJ	+ 1'17"
9	Benoît Cosnefroy (FRA)	AG2R La Mondiale	+ 1'18"
10	Fabio Jakobsen (NED)	Quick-Step Floors	+ 1'24"
