= 2018 Eschborn–Frankfurt =

Cycling race

2018 Eschborn-Frankfurt
2018 UCI World Tour, race 20 of 37

Race details
- Dates: 1 May 2018
- Stages: 1
- Distance: 212.5 km (132.0 mi)
- Winning time: 5h 13' 24"

Results
| | Winner | Alexander Kristoff (NOR) | (UAE Team Emirates) |
| | Second | Michael Matthews (AUS) | (Team Sunweb) |
| | Third | Oliver Naesen (BEL) | (AG2R La Mondiale) |

The 2018 Eschborn–Frankfurt was a road cycling one-day race that took place on 1 May 2018 in Germany. It was the 56th edition of the Eschborn-Frankfurt and the twentieth event of the 2018 UCI World Tour.

European champion Alexander Kristoff won the race for a record fourth consecutive edition. Michael Matthews and Oliver Naesen took second and third place.

== Result ==
Result
| Rank | Rider | Team | Time |
|---|---|---|---|
| 1 | Alexander Kristoff (NOR) | UAE Team Emirates | 5h 13' 24" |
| 2 | Michael Matthews (AUS) | Team Sunweb | + 0" |
| 3 | Oliver Naesen (BEL) | AG2R La Mondiale | + 0" |
| 4 | Andrea Pasqualon (ITA) | Wanty–Groupe Gobert | + 0" |
| 5 | Sean De Bie (BEL) | Vérandas Willems–Crelan | + 0" |
| 6 | Grega Bole (SLO) | Bahrain–Merida | + 0" |
| 7 | Sam Bennett (IRL) | Bora–Hansgrohe | + 0" |
| 8 | Edvald Boasson Hagen (NOR) | Team Dimension Data | + 0" |
| 9 | Jan Tratnik (SLO) | CCC–Sprandi–Polkowice | + 0" |
| 10 | Juan José Lobato (ESP) | Nippo–Vini Fantini–Europa Ovini | + 0" |
