= List of 2018 UCI WorldTeams and riders =

This page is a list of 2018 UCI WorldTeams and riders. These teams are competing in the 2018 UCI World Tour.

== Teams overview ==
The 18 WorldTeams in 2018 are:

2018 UCI World Teams and equipment
Code	Official Team Name	Country	Groupset	Road Bike(s)	Time Trial Bike	Wheels
ALM	AG2R La Mondiale (2018 season)	France	Shimano	Factor Bikes 02; Factor Bikes ONE; Factor Bikes ONE–S	Factor Bikes Slick	Mavic
AST	Astana (2018 season)	Kazakhstan	Shimano	Argon 18 Gallium Pro; Argon 18 Nitrogen Pro; Argon Krypton	E-118 Next	Corima
TBM	Bahrain–Merida (2018 season)	Bahrain	Shimano	Merida Scultura; Merida Reacto	Merida Warp	Fulcrum
BMC	BMC Racing Team (2018 season)	United States	Shimano	BMC Teammachine SLR01; BMC Timemachine TMR01; BMC Roadmachine RM01	BMC TimeMachine TM01	Shimano
BOH	Bora–Hansgrohe (2018 season)	Germany	Shimano	S-Works Venge; S-Works Tarmac; S-Works Roubaix	S-Works Shiv	Roval
DDD	Team Dimension Data (2018 season)	South Africa	Shimano/Rotor	Cervélo S5; Cervélo R5; Cervélo C5	Cervélo P5	Enve
EFD	EF Education First–Drapac p/b Cannondale (2018 season)	United States	Shimano/FSA	Cannondale SuperSix EVO Hi-Mod; Cannondale Synapse Hi-Mod; Cannondale SystemSix Hi-Mod	Cannondale Slice Hi-Mod	Vision
FDJ	Groupama–FDJ (2018 season)	France	Shimano	Lapierre Xelius SL; Lapierre Aircode SL; Lapierre Pulsium	Lapierre Aerostorm DRS	Shimano
TKA	Team Katusha–Alpecin (2018 season)	Switzerland	SRAM	Canyon Ultimate CF SLX; Canyon Aeroad CF SLX; Canyon Endurance CF SL	Canyon Speedmax CF	Zipp
TLJ	LottoNL–Jumbo (2018 season)	Netherlands	Shimano	Bianchi OltreXR2; Bianchi Specialissima; Bianchi Aria	Bianchi Aquila CV	Shimano
LTS	Lotto–Soudal (2018 season)	Belgium	Campagnolo	Ridley Helium SLX; Ridley Noah SL; Ridley Fenix SL	Ridley Dean Fast	Campagnolo
MTS	Mitchelton-Scott (2018 season)	Australia	Shimano	Scott Foil; Scott Addict	Scott Plasma	Shimano
MOV	Movistar Team (2018 season)	Spain	Campagnolo	Canyon Ultimate CF SLX; Canyon Aeroad CF SLX; Canyon Endurance CF SL	Canyon Speedmax CF	Campagnolo
QST	Quick-Step Floors (2018 season)	Belgium	Shimano/FSA	S-Works Venge; S-Works Tarmac; S-Works Roubaix	S-Works Shiv	Roval; HED
SKY	Team Sky (2018 season)	Great Britain	Shimano	Pinarello Dogma F10; Pinarello Dogma K8-S; Pinarello GAN	Pinarello Bolide	Shimano
SUN	Team Sunweb (2018 season)	Germany	Shimano	Giant TCR Advanced SL; Giant Propel Advanced SL; Giant Defy Advanced SL	Giant Trinity	Giant
TFS	Trek–Segafredo (2018 season)	United States	Shimano	Trek Emonda; Trek Madone; Trek Domane	Trek SpeedConcept	Bontrager
UAD	UAE Team Emirates (2018 season)	United Arab Emirates	Campagnolo	Colnago C60; Colnago Concept; Colnago V1-R	Colnago K-Zero	Campagnolo

== Riders ==
=== AG2R La Mondiale ===
Rider	Date of birth
Gediminas Bagdonas (LTU)	26 December 1985 (aged 32)
Jan Bakelants (BEL)	14 February 1986 (aged 31)
Rudy Barbier (FRA)	18 December 1992 (aged 25)
Romain Bardet (FRA)	9 November 1990 (aged 27)
François Bidard (FRA)	19 March 1992 (aged 25)
Mikaël Cherel (FRA)	17 March 1986 (aged 31)
Clément Chevrier (FRA)	29 June 1992 (aged 25)
Nico Denz (GER)	15 February 1994 (aged 23)
Silvan Dillier (SUI)	3 August 1990 (aged 27)
Axel Domont (FRA)	August 7, 1990 (aged 27)
Samuel Dumoulin (FRA)	20 August 1980 (aged 37)
Hubert Dupont (FRA)	13 November 1980 (aged 37)
Julien Duval (FRA)	27 May 1990 (aged 27)

Rider	Date of birth
Mathias Frank (SUI)	9 December 1986 (aged 31)
Tony Gallopin (FRA)	24 May 1988 (aged 29)
Ben Gastauer (LUX)	14 November 1987 (aged 30)
Cyril Gautier (FRA)	26 September 1987 (aged 30)
Alexandre Geniez (FRA)	16 April 1988 (aged 29)
Alexis Gougeard (FRA)	5 March 1993 (aged 24)
Quentin Jaurégui (FRA)	22 April 1994 (aged 23)
Pierre Latour (FRA)	12 October 1993 (aged 24)
Matteo Montaguti (ITA)	6 January 1984 (aged 33)
Oliver Naesen (BEL)	16 September 1990 (aged 27)
Stijn Vandenbergh (BEL)	25 April 1984 (aged 33)
Clément Venturini (SUI)	16 October 1993 (aged 24)
Alexis Vuillermoz (FRA)	1 June 1988 (aged 29)

=== Astana ===
Rider	Date of birth
Pello Bilbao (ESP)	25 February 1990 (aged 27)
Zhandos Bizhigitov (KAZ)	10 June 1991 (aged 26)
Dario Cataldo (ITA)	17 March 1985 (aged 32)
Sergey Chernetskiy (RUS)	9 April 1990 (aged 27)
Laurens De Vreese (BEL)	29 September 1988 (aged 29)
Daniil Fominykh (KAZ)	28 August 1991 (aged 26)
Omar Fraile (ESP)	17 July 1990 (aged 27)
Jakob Fuglsang (DEN)	22 March 1985 (aged 32)
Oscar Gatto (ITA)	1 January 1985 (aged 33)
Andriy Grivko (UKR)	7 August 1983 (aged 34)
Dmitriy Gruzdev (KAZ)	13 March 1986 (aged 31)
Jesper Hansen (DEN)	23 October 1990 (aged 27)
Jan Hirt (CZE)	21 January 1990 (aged 27)
Hugo Houle (CAN)	27 September 1990 (aged 27)

Rider	Date of birth
Tanel Kangert (EST)	11 March 1987 (aged 30)
Truls Engen Korsæth (NOR)	16 September 1993 (aged 24)
Bakhtiyar Kozhatayev (KAZ)	28 March 1992 (aged 25)
Miguel Ángel López (COL)	4 February 1994 (aged 23)
Alexey Lutsenko (KAZ)	7 September 1992 (aged 25)
Moreno Moser (ITA)	25 December 1990 (aged 27)
Magnus Cort Nielsen (DEN)	16 January 1993 (aged 24)
Luis León Sánchez (ESP)	24 November 1983 (aged 34)
Nikita Stalnov (KAZ)	14 September 1991 (aged 26)
Ruslan Tleubayev (KAZ)	7 March 1987 (aged 30)
Michael Valgren (DEN)	7 February 1992 (aged 25)
Davide Villella (ITA)	27 June 1991 (aged 26)
Artyom Zakharov (KAZ)	27 October 1991 (aged 26)
Andrey Zeits (KAZ)	14 December 1986 (aged 31)

=== Bahrain–Merida ===
Rider	Date of birth
Valerio Agnoli (ITA)	6 January 1985 (aged 32)
Yukiya Arashiro (JPN)	22 September 1984 (aged 33)
Manuele Boaro (ITA)	12 March 1987 (aged 30)
Grega Bole (SLO)	13 August 1985 (aged 32)
Niccolò Bonifazio (ITA)	29 October 1993 (aged 24)
Borut Božič (SLO)	8 August 1980 (aged 37)
Sonny Colbrelli (ITA)	17 May 1990 (aged 27)
Chun Kai Feng (TPE)	2 November 1988 (aged 29)
Iván García Cortina (ESP)	20 November 1995 (aged 22)
Enrico Gasparotto (ITA)	22 March 1982 (aged 35)
Heinrich Haussler (AUS)	25 February 1984 (aged 33)
Gorka Izagirre (ESP)	7 October 1987 (aged 30)
Ion Izagirre (ESP)	4 February 1989 (aged 28)
Kristijan Koren (SLO)	25 November 1986 (aged 31)

Rider	Date of birth
Matej Mohorič (SLO)	19 October 1994 (aged 23)
Ramūnas Navardauskas (LTU)	30 January 1988 (aged 29)
Antonio Nibali (ITA)	23 September 1992 (aged 25)
Vincenzo Nibali (ITA)	14 November 1984 (aged 33)
Domen Novak (SLO)	12 July 1995 (aged 22)
Mark Padun (UKR)	6 July 1996 (aged 21)
Franco Pellizotti (ITA)	15 January 1978 (aged 39)
David Per (SLO)	13 February 1995 (aged 22)
Hermann Pernsteiner (AUT)	7 August 1990 (aged 27)
Luka Pibernik (SLO)	23 October 1993 (aged 24)
Domenico Pozzovivo (ITA)	30 November 1982 (aged 35)
Kanstantsin Siutsou (BLR)	9 August 1982 (aged 35)
Giovanni Visconti (ITA)	13 January 1983 (aged 34)
Wang Meiyin (CHN)	26 December 1988 (aged 29)

=== BMC Racing Team ===
Rider	Date of birth
Alberto Bettiol (ITA)	29 October 1993 (aged 24)
Patrick Bevin (NZL)	15 February 1991 (aged 26)
Tom Bohli (SUI)	17 January 1994 (aged 23)
Brent Bookwalter (USA)	16 February 1984 (aged 33)
Damiano Caruso (ITA)	12 October 1987 (aged 30)
Alessandro De Marchi (ITA)	19 May 1986 (aged 31)
Rohan Dennis (AUS)	28 May 1990 (aged 27)
Jean-Pierre Drucker (LUX)	3 September 1986 (aged 31)
Kilian Frankiny (SUI)	26 January 1994 (aged 23)
Simon Gerrans (AUS)	16 May 1980 (aged 37)
Stefan Küng (SUI)	16 November 1993 (aged 24)
Richie Porte (AUS)	30 January 1985 (aged 32)

Rider	Date of birth
Nicolas Roche (IRL)	3 July 1984 (aged 33)
Jürgen Roelandts (BEL)	2 July 1985 (aged 32)
Joseph Rosskopf (USA)	5 September 1989 (aged 28)
Michael Schär (SUI)	29 September 1986 (aged 31)
Miles Scotson (AUS)	18 January 1994 (aged 23)
Dylan Teuns (BEL)	1 March 1992 (aged 25)
Greg Van Avermaet (BEL)	17 May 1985 (aged 32)
Tejay van Garderen (USA)	12 August 1988 (aged 29)
Nathan Van Hooydonck (BEL)	12 October 1995 (aged 22)
Francisco Ventoso (ESP)	6 May 1982 (aged 35)
Loïc Vliegen (BEL)	20 December 1993 (aged 24)
Danilo Wyss (SUI)	26 August 1985 (aged 32)

=== Bora–Hansgrohe ===
Rider	Date of birth
Pascal Ackermann (GER)	17 January 1994 (aged 23)
Erik Baška (SVK)	12 January 1994 (aged 23)
Cesare Benedetti (ITA)	3 August 1987 (aged 30)
Sam Bennett (IRL)	16 October 1990 (aged 27)
Maciej Bodnar (POL)	7 March 1985 (aged 32)
Emanuel Buchmann (GER)	18 November 1992 (aged 25)
Marcus Burghardt (GER)	30 June 1983 (aged 34)
Davide Formolo (ITA)	25 October 1992 (aged 25)
Felix Grossschartner (AUT)	23 December 1993 (aged 24)
Peter Kennaugh (GBR)	15 June 1989 (aged 28)
Michal Kolář (SVK)	21 December 1992 (aged 25)
Leopold König (CZE)	15 November 1987 (aged 30)
Patrick Konrad (AUT)	13 October 1991 (aged 26)
Rafał Majka (POL)	12 September 1989 (aged 28)

Rider	Date of birth
Jay McCarthy (AUS)	8 September 1992 (aged 25)
Gregor Mühlberger (AUT)	4 April 1994 (aged 23)
Daniel Oss (ITA)	13 January 1987 (aged 30)
Matteo Pelucchi (ITA)	21 January 1989 (aged 28)
Christoph Pfingsten (GER)	20 November 1987 (aged 30)
Paweł Poljański (POL)	6 May 1990 (aged 27)
Lukas Pöstlberger (AUT)	10 January 1992 (aged 25)
Juraj Sagan (SVK)	23 December 1988 (aged 29)
Peter Sagan (SVK)	26 January 1990 (aged 27)
Aleksejs Saramotins (LAT)	8 April 1982 (aged 35)
Andreas Schillinger (GER)	13 July 1983 (aged 34)
Michael Schwarzmann (GER)	7 January 1991 (aged 26)
Rüdiger Selig (GER)	19 February 1989 (aged 28)

=== Team Dimension Data ===
Rider	Date of birth
Igor Antón (ESP)	2 March 1983 (aged 34)
Natnael Berhane (ERI)	5 January 1991 (aged 26)
Mark Cavendish (GBR)	21 May 1985 (aged 32)
Stephen Cummings (GBR)	19 March 1981 (aged 36)
Scott Davies (GBR)	5 August 1995 (aged 22)
Mekseb Debesay (ERI)	16 June 1991 (aged 26)
Nicholas Dlamini (RSA)	12 August 1995 (aged 22)
Nicolas Dougall (RSA)	21 November 1992 (aged 25)
Bernhard Eisel (AUT)	17 February 1981 (aged 36)
Amanuel Ghebreigzabhier (ERI)	17 August 1994 (aged 23)
Ryan Gibbons (RSA)	13 August 1994 (aged 23)
Edvald Boasson Hagen (NOR)	17 May 1987 (aged 30)
Jacques Janse van Rensburg (RSA)	6 September 1987 (aged 30)
Reinardt Janse van Rensburg (RSA)	3 February 1989 (aged 28)

Rider	Date of birth
Benjamin King (USA)	22 March 1989 (aged 28)
Merhawi Kudus (ERI)	23 January 1994 (aged 23)
Louis Meintjes (RSA)	21 February 1992 (aged 25)
Lachlan Morton (AUS)	2 January 1992 (aged 25)
Ben O'Connor (AUS)	25 November 1995 (aged 22)
Serge Pauwels (BEL)	21 November 1983 (aged 34)
Mark Renshaw (AUS)	22 October 1982 (aged 35)
Tom-Jelte Slagter (NED)	1 July 1989 (aged 28)
Jay Thomson (RSA)	12 April 1986 (aged 31)
Scott Thwaites (GBR)	12 February 1990 (aged 27)
Johann van Zyl (RSA)	2 February 1991 (aged 26)
Jaco Venter (RSA)	13 February 1987 (aged 30)
Julien Vermote (BEL)	26 July 1989 (aged 28)

=== EF Education First–Drapac p/b Cannondale ===
Rider	Date of birth
Matti Breschel (DEN)	31 August 1984 (aged 33)
Nathan Brown (USA)	7 July 1991 (aged 26)
Brendan Canty (AUS)	17 January 1992 (aged 25)
Julian Cardona (COL)	19 January 1997 (aged 20)
Hugh Carthy (GBR)	9 July 1994 (aged 23)
Simon Clarke (AUS)	18 July 1986 (aged 31)
William Clarke (AUS)	11 April 1985 (aged 32)
Lawson Craddock (USA)	20 February 1992 (aged 25)
Mitchell Docker (AUS)	2 October 1986 (aged 31)
Joseph Dombrowski (USA)	12 May 1991 (aged 26)
Alex Howes (USA)	1 January 1988 (aged 30)
Sebastian Langeveld (NED)	17 January 1985 (aged 32)
Kim Magnusson (SWE)	31 August 1992 (aged 25)

Rider	Date of birth
Daniel Martínez (COL)	25 April 1996 (aged 21)
Daniel McLay (GBR)	3 January 1992 (aged 25)
Sacha Modolo (ITA)	19 June 1987 (aged 30)
Daniel Moreno (ESP)	5 September 1981 (aged 36)
Logan Owen (USA)	25 March 1995 (aged 22)
Taylor Phinney (USA)	27 June 1990 (aged 27)
Pierre Rolland (FRA)	10 October 1986 (aged 31)
Tom Scully (NZL)	14 January 1990 (aged 27)
Rigoberto Urán (COL)	26 January 1987 (aged 30)
Tom Van Asbroeck (BEL)	19 April 1990 (aged 27)
Sep Vanmarcke (BEL)	28 July 1988 (aged 29)
Michael Woods (CAN)	12 October 1986 (aged 31)

=== Groupama–FDJ ===
Rider	Date of birth
Bruno Armirail (FRA)	11 April 1994 (aged 23)
William Bonnet (FRA)	25 June 1982 (aged 35)
Davide Cimolai (ITA)	13 August 1989 (aged 28)
Mickaël Delage (FRA)	6 August 1985 (aged 32)
Arnaud Démare (FRA)	26 August 1991 (aged 26)
Antoine Duchesne (CAN)	12 September 1991 (aged 26)
David Gaudu (FRA)	10 October 1996 (aged 21)
Jacopo Guarnieri (ITA)	14 August 1987 (aged 30)
Daniel Hoelgaard (NOR)	1 July 1993 (aged 24)
Ignatas Konovalovas (LTU)	8 December 1985 (aged 32)
Mathieu Ladagnous (FRA)	12 December 1984 (aged 33)
Olivier Le Gac (FRA)	27 August 1993 (aged 24)
Tobias Ludvigsson (SWE)	22 February 1991 (aged 26)
Valentin Madouas (FRA)	12 July 1996 (aged 21)

Rider	Date of birth
Rudy Molard (FRA)	17 September 1989 (aged 28)
Steve Morabito (SUI)	30 January 1983 (aged 34)
Thibaut Pinot (FRA)	29 May 1990 (aged 27)
Georg Preidler (AUT)	17 June 1990 (aged 27)
Sébastien Reichenbach (SUI)	28 May 1989 (aged 28)
Anthony Roux (FRA)	18 April 1987 (aged 30)
Jérémy Roy (FRA)	22 June 1983 (aged 34)
Marc Sarreau (FRA)	10 June 1993 (aged 24)
Romain Seigle (FRA)	11 October 1994 (aged 23)
Ramon Sinkeldam (NED)	9 February 1989 (aged 28)
Benjamin Thomas (FRA)	12 September 1995 (aged 22)
Benoît Vaugrenard (FRA)	5 January 1982 (aged 35)
Arthur Vichot (FRA)	26 November 1988 (aged 29)
Léo Vincent (FRA)	6 November 1995 (aged 22)

=== Team Katusha–Alpecin ===
Rider	Date of birth
Maxim Belkov (RUS)	9 January 1985 (aged 32)
Jenthe Biermans (BEL)	30 October 1995 (aged 22)
Ian Boswell (USA)	7 February 1991 (aged 26)
Steff Cras (BEL)	13 February 1996 (aged 21)
Alex Dowsett (GBR)	3 October 1988 (aged 29)
Matteo Fabbro (ITA)	10 April 1995 (aged 22)
José Gonçalves (POR)	13 February 1989 (aged 28)
Nathan Haas (AUS)	12 March 1989 (aged 28)
Marco Haller (AUT)	1 April 1991 (aged 26)
Reto Hollenstein (SUI)	22 August 1985 (aged 32)
Robert Kišerlovski (CRO)	9 August 1986 (aged 31)
Marcel Kittel (GER)	11 May 1988 (aged 29)
Pavel Kochetkov (RUS)	7 March 1986 (aged 31)

Rider	Date of birth
Maurits Lammertink (NED)	31 August 1990 (aged 27)
Tiago Machado (POR)	18 October 1985 (aged 32)
Tony Martin (GER)	23 April 1985 (aged 32)
Marco Mathis (GER)	7 April 1994 (aged 23)
Baptiste Planckaert (BEL)	28 September 1988 (aged 29)
Nils Politt (GER)	6 March 1994 (aged 23)
Jhonatan Restrepo (COL)	28 November 1994 (aged 23)
Willie Smit (RSA)	29 December 1992 (aged 25)
Simon Špilak (SLO)	23 June 1986 (aged 31)
Mads Würtz Schmidt (DEN)	31 March 1994 (aged 23)
Rick Zabel (GER)	7 December 1993 (aged 24)
Ilnur Zakarin (RUS)	15 September 1989 (aged 28)

=== LottoNL–Jumbo ===
Rider	Date of birth
Enrico Battaglin (ITA)	17 November 1989 (aged 28)
George Bennett (NZL)	7 April 1990 (aged 27)
Lars Boom (NED)	30 December 1985 (aged 32)
Koen Bouwman (NED)	2 December 1993 (aged 24)
Stef Clement (NED)	24 September 1982 (aged 35)
Floris De Tier (BEL)	20 January 1992 (aged 25)
Pascal Eenkhoorn (NED)	8 February 1997 (aged 20)
Robert Gesink (NED)	31 May 1986 (aged 31)
Dylan Groenewegen (NED)	21 June 1993 (aged 24)
Amund Grøndahl Jansen (NOR)	11 February 1994 (aged 23)
Steven Kruijswijk (NED)	7 June 1987 (aged 30)
Sepp Kuss (USA)	13 September 1994 (aged 23)
Thomas Leezer (NED)	26 December 1985 (aged 32)

Rider	Date of birth
Bert-Jan Lindeman (NED)	16 June 1989 (aged 28)
Paul Martens (GER)	26 October 1983 (aged 34)
Daan Olivier (NED)	24 November 1992 (aged 25)
Neilson Powless (USA)	3 September 1996 (aged 21)
Primož Roglič (SLO)	29 October 1989 (aged 28)
Timo Roosen (NED)	11 January 1993 (aged 24)
Bram Tankink (NED)	3 December 1978 (aged 39)
Antwan Tolhoek (NED)	29 April 1994 (aged 23)
Jos van Emden (NED)	18 February 1985 (aged 32)
Gijs Van Hoecke (BEL)	12 November 1991 (aged 26)
Danny van Poppel (NED)	26 July 1993 (aged 24)
Robert Wagner (GER)	17 April 1983 (aged 34)
Maarten Wynants (BEL)	13 May 1982 (aged 35)

=== Lotto–Soudal ===
Rider	Date of birth
Sander Armée (BEL)	10 December 1985 (aged 32)
Lars Bak (DEN)	16 January 1980 (aged 37)
Tiesj Benoot (BEL)	11 March 1994 (aged 23)
Victor Campenaerts (BEL)	28 October 1991 (aged 26)
Jasper De Buyst (BEL)	24 November 1993 (aged 24)
Thomas De Gendt (BEL)	6 November 1986 (aged 31)
Jens Debusschere (BEL)	28 August 1989 (aged 28)
Frederik Frison (BEL)	28 July 1992 (aged 25)
André Greipel (GER)	16 July 1982 (aged 35)
Adam Hansen (AUS)	11 May 1981 (aged 36)
Moreno Hofland (NED)	31 August 1991 (aged 26)
Jens Keukeleire (BEL)	23 November 1988 (aged 29)
Bjorg Lambrecht (BEL)	2 April 1997 (aged 20)

Rider	Date of birth
Nikolas Maes (BEL)	9 April 1986 (aged 31)
Tomasz Marczyński (POL)	6 March 1984 (aged 33)
Remy Mertz (BEL)	17 July 1995 (aged 22)
Maxime Monfort (BEL)	14 January 1983 (aged 34)
Lawrence Naesen (BEL)	28 August 1992 (aged 25)
James Shaw (GBR)	13 June 1996 (aged 21)
Marcel Sieberg (GER)	30 April 1982 (aged 35)
Tosh Van der Sande (BEL)	28 November 1990 (aged 27)
Jelle Vanendert (BEL)	19 February 1985 (aged 32)
Jelle Wallays (BEL)	11 May 1989 (aged 28)
Tim Wellens (BEL)	10 May 1991 (aged 26)
Enzo Wouters (BEL)	21 March 1996 (aged 21)

=== Mitchelton–Scott ===
Rider	Date of birth
Michael Albasini (SUI)	20 December 1980 (aged 37)
Jack Bauer (NZL)	7 April 1985 (aged 32)
Sam Bewley (NZL)	22 July 1987 (aged 30)
Esteban Chaves (COL)	17 January 1990 (aged 27)
Luke Durbridge (AUS)	9 April 1991 (aged 26)
Alexander Edmondson (AUS)	22 December 1993 (aged 24)
Caleb Ewan (AUS)	11 July 1994 (aged 23)
Jack Haig (AUS)	6 September 1993 (aged 24)
Lucas Hamilton (AUS)	12 February 1996 (aged 21)
Mathew Hayman (AUS)	20 April 1978 (aged 39)
Michael Hepburn (AUS)	17 August 1991 (aged 26)
Damien Howson (AUS)	13 August 1992 (aged 25)
Daryl Impey (RSA)	6 December 1984 (aged 33)

Rider	Date of birth
Christopher Juul Jensen (DEN)	6 July 1989 (aged 28)
Roger Kluge (GER)	5 February 1986 (aged 31)
Roman Kreuziger (CZE)	6 May 1986 (aged 31)
Cameron Meyer (AUS)	11 January 1988 (aged 29)
Luka Mezgec (SLO)	27 June 1988 (aged 29)
Mikel Nieve (ESP)	26 May 1984 (aged 33)
Robert Power (AUS)	11 May 1995 (aged 22)
Matteo Trentin (ITA)	2 August 1989 (aged 28)
Svein Tuft (CAN)	9 May 1977 (aged 40)
Carlos Verona (ESP)	4 November 1992 (aged 25)
Adam Yates (GBR)	7 August 1992 (aged 25)
Simon Yates (GBR)	7 August 1992 (aged 25)

=== Movistar Team ===
Rider	Date of birth
Andrey Amador (CRC)	29 August 1986 (aged 31)
Winner Anacona (COL)	11 August 1988 (aged 29)
Jorge Arcas (ESP)	8 July 1992 (aged 25)
Carlos Barbero (ESP)	29 April 1991 (aged 26)
Daniele Bennati (ITA)	24 September 1980 (aged 37)
Carlos Betancur (COL)	13 October 1989 (aged 28)
Nuno Bico (POR)	3 July 1994 (aged 23)
Richard Carapaz (ECU)	29 May 1993 (aged 24)
Héctor Carretero (ESP)	28 May 1995 (aged 22)
Jaime Castrillo (ESP)	13 March 1996 (aged 21)
Víctor de la Parte (ESP)	22 June 1986 (aged 31)
Imanol Erviti (ESP)	15 November 1983 (aged 34)
Ruben Fernández (ESP)	1 March 1991 (aged 26)

Rider	Date of birth
Mikel Landa (ESP)	13 December 1989 (aged 28)
Nelson Oliveira (POR)	6 March 1989 (aged 28)
Antonio Pedrero (ESP)	23 October 1991 (aged 26)
Dayer Quintana (COL)	10 August 1992 (aged 25)
Nairo Quintana (COL)	4 February 1990 (aged 27)
José Rojas (ESP)	8 June 1985 (aged 32)
Jaime Roson (ESP)	13 January 1993 (aged 24)
Eduardo Sepúlveda (ARG)	13 June 1991 (aged 26)
Marc Soler (ESP)	22 November 1993 (aged 24)
Jasha Sütterlin (GER)	4 November 1992 (aged 25)
Rafael Valls (ESP)	25 June 1987 (aged 30)
Alejandro Valverde (ESP)	25 April 1980 (aged 37)

=== Quick-Step Floors ===
Rider	Date of birth
Julian Alaphilippe (FRA)	11 June 1992 (aged 25)
Kasper Asgreen (DEN)	8 February 1995 (aged 22)
Eros Capecchi (ITA)	13 June 1986 (aged 31)
Rémi Cavagna (FRA)	10 August 1995 (aged 22)
Laurens De Plus (BEL)	4 September 1995 (aged 22)
Tim Declercq (BEL)	21 March 1989 (aged 28)
Dries Devenyns (BEL)	22 July 1983 (aged 34)
Fernando Gaviria (COL)	19 August 1994 (aged 23)
Philippe Gilbert (BEL)	5 July 1982 (aged 35)
Álvaro José Hodeg (COL)	16 September 1996 (aged 21)
Fabio Jakobsen (NED)	31 August 1996 (aged 21)
Bob Jungels (LUX)	22 September 1992 (aged 25)
Iljo Keisse (BEL)	21 December 1982 (aged 35)
James Knox (GBR)	4 November 1995 (aged 22)

Rider	Date of birth
Yves Lampaert (BEL)	10 April 1991 (aged 26)
Davide Martinelli (ITA)	31 May 1993 (aged 24)
Enric Mas (ESP)	7 January 1995 (aged 22)
Michael Mørkøv (DEN)	30 April 1985 (aged 32)
Jhonatan Narváez (ECU)	4 March 1997 (aged 20)
Maximiliano Richeze (ARG)	7 March 1983 (aged 34)
Fabio Sabatini (ITA)	18 February 1985 (aged 32)
Maximilian Schachmann (GER)	9 January 1994 (aged 23)
Florian Sénéchal (FRA)	10 July 1993 (aged 24)
Pieter Serry (BEL)	21 November 1988 (aged 29)
Zdenek Štybar (CZE)	11 December 1985 (aged 32)
Niki Terpstra (NED)	18 May 1984 (aged 33)
Elia Viviani (ITA)	7 February 1989 (aged 28)

=== Team Sky ===
Rider	Date of birth
Leonardo Basso (ITA)	25 December 1993 (aged 24)
Egan Bernal (COL)	13 January 1997 (aged 20)
Jonathan Castroviejo (ESP)	27 April 1987 (aged 30)
David de la Cruz (ESP)	6 May 1989 (aged 28)
Philip Deignan (IRL)	7 September 1983 (aged 34)
Jonathan Dibben (GBR)	12 February 1994 (aged 23)
Owain Doull (GBR)	2 May 1993 (aged 24)
Kenny Elissonde (FRA)	22 July 1991 (aged 26)
Chris Froome (GBR)	20 May 1985 (aged 32)
Tao Geoghegan Hart (GBR)	30 March 1995 (aged 22)
Michał Gołaś (POL)	29 April 1984 (aged 33)
Kristoffer Halvorsen (NOR)	13 April 1996 (aged 21)
Sebastián Henao (COL)	5 August 1993 (aged 24)
Sergio Henao (COL)	10 December 1987 (aged 30)
Beñat Intxausti (ESP)	20 March 1986 (aged 31)

Rider	Date of birth
Vasil Kiryienka (BLR)	28 June 1981 (aged 36)
Christian Knees (GER)	5 March 1981 (aged 36)
Michał Kwiatkowski (POL)	2 June 1990 (aged 27)
Christopher Lawless (GBR)	4 November 1995 (aged 22)
David López (ESP)	13 May 1981 (aged 36)
Gianni Moscon (ITA)	20 April 1994 (aged 23)
Wout Poels (NED)	1 October 1987 (aged 30)
Salvatore Puccio (ITA)	31 August 1989 (aged 28)
Diego Rosa (ITA)	27 March 1989 (aged 28)
Luke Rowe (GBR)	10 March 1990 (aged 27)
Pavel Sivakov (RUS)	11 July 1997 (aged 20)
Ian Stannard (GBR)	25 May 1987 (aged 30)
Geraint Thomas (GBR)	25 May 1986 (aged 31)
Dylan van Baarle (NED)	21 May 1992 (aged 25)
Łukasz Wiśniowski (POL)	7 December 1991 (aged 26)

=== Team Sunweb ===
Rider	Date of birth
Nikias Arndt (GER)	18 November 1991 (aged 26)
Phil Bauhaus (GER)	8 July 1994 (aged 23)
Roy Curvers (NED)	27 December 1979 (aged 38)
Tom Dumoulin (NED)	11 November 1990 (aged 27)
Johannes Fröhlinger (GER)	9 June 1985 (aged 32)
Simon Geschke (GER)	13 March 1986 (aged 31)
Chad Haga (USA)	26 August 1988 (aged 29)
Christopher Hamilton (AUS)	18 May 1995 (aged 22)
Jai Hindley (AUS)	5 May 1996 (aged 21)
Lennard Hofstede (NED)	29 December 1994 (aged 23)
Lennard Kämna (GER)	9 September 1996 (aged 21)
Wilco Kelderman (NED)	25 March 1991 (aged 26)

Rider	Date of birth
Søren Kragh Andersen (DEN)	10 August 1994 (aged 23)
Michael Matthews (AUS)	26 September 1990 (aged 27)
Sam Oomen (NED)	15 August 1995 (aged 22)
Tom Stamsnijder (NED)	15 May 1985 (aged 32)
Michael Storer (AUS)	28 February 1997 (aged 20)
Laurens Ten Dam (NED)	13 November 1980 (aged 37)
Mike Teunissen (NED)	25 August 1992 (aged 25)
Edward Theuns (BEL)	30 April 1991 (aged 26)
Martijn Tusveld (NED)	9 September 1993 (aged 24)
Louis Vervaeke (BEL)	6 October 1993 (aged 24)
Maximilian Walscheid (GER)	13 June 1993 (aged 24)

=== Trek–Segafredo ===
Rider	Date of birth
Eugenio Alafaci (ITA)	9 August 1990 (aged 27)
Fumiyuki Beppu (JPN)	10 April 1983 (aged 34)
Julien Bernard (FRA)	17 March 1992 (aged 25)
Gianluca Brambilla (ITA)	22 August 1987 (aged 30)
Matthias Brändle (AUT)	7 December 1989 (aged 28)
Nicola Conci (ITA)	5 January 1997 (aged 20)
Gregory Daniel (USA)	8 November 1994 (aged 23)
Koen de Kort (NED)	8 September 1982 (aged 35)
John Degenkolb (GER)	7 January 1989 (aged 28)
Laurent Didier (LUX)	19 July 1984 (aged 33)
Niklas Eg (DEN)	6 January 1995 (aged 22)
Fabio Felline (ITA)	29 March 1990 (aged 27)
Alex Frame (NZL)	18 June 1993 (aged 24)
Michael Gogl (AUT)	4 November 1993 (aged 24)

Rider	Date of birth
Tsgabu Grmay (ETH)	25 August 1991 (aged 26)
Ruben Guerreiro (POR)	6 July 1994 (aged 23)
Markel Irizar (ESP)	5 February 1980 (aged 37)
Bauke Mollema (NED)	26 November 1986 (aged 31)
Ryan Mullen (IRL)	7 August 1994 (aged 23)
Giacomo Nizzolo (ITA)	30 January 1989 (aged 28)
Jarlinson Pantano (COL)	19 November 1988 (aged 29)
Mads Pedersen (DEN)	18 December 1995 (aged 22)
Grégory Rast (SUI)	17 January 1980 (aged 37)
Kiel Reijnen (USA)	1 June 1986 (aged 31)
Toms Skujiņš (LAT)	15 June 1991 (aged 26)
Peter Stetina (USA)	8 August 1987 (aged 30)
Jasper Stuyven (BEL)	17 April 1992 (aged 25)
Boy Van Poppel (NED)	18 January 1988 (aged 29)

=== UAE Team Emirates ===
Rider	Date of birth
Anass Ait El Abdia (MAR)	21 March 1993 (aged 24)
Fabio Aru (ITA)	3 July 1990 (aged 27)
Darwin Atapuma (COL)	15 January 1988 (aged 29)
Matteo Bono (ITA)	11 November 1983 (aged 34)
Sven Erik Bystrøm (NOR)	21 January 1992 (aged 25)
Simone Consonni (ITA)	12 September 1994 (aged 23)
Valerio Conti (ITA)	30 March 1993 (aged 24)
Kristijan Đurasek (CRO)	26 July 1987 (aged 30)
Rui Costa (POR)	5 October 1986 (aged 31)
Roberto Ferrari (ITA)	9 March 1983 (aged 34)
Filippo Ganna (ITA)	25 July 1996 (aged 21)
Alexander Kristoff (NOR)	5 July 1987 (aged 30)
Vegard Stake Laengen (NOR)	7 February 1989 (aged 28)

Rider	Date of birth
Marco Marcato (ITA)	11 February 1984 (aged 33)
Daniel Martin (IRL)	20 August 1986 (aged 31)
Yousif Mirza (UAE)	8 October 1988 (aged 29)
Manuele Mori (ITA)	9 August 1980 (aged 37)
Przemyslaw Niemiec (POL)	11 April 1980 (aged 37)
Simone Petilli (ITA)	4 May 1993 (aged 24)
Jan Polanc (SLO)	6 May 1992 (aged 25)
Edward Ravasi (ITA)	5 June 1994 (aged 23)
Alexandr Riabushenko (BLR)	12 October 1995 (aged 22)
Rory Sutherland (AUS)	8 February 1982 (aged 35)
Ben Swift (GBR)	5 November 1987 (aged 30)
Oliviero Troia (ITA)	1 September 1994 (aged 23)
Diego Ulissi (ITA)	15 July 1989 (aged 28)

== See also ==
- 2018 in men's road cycling
- List of 2018 UCI Professional Continental and Continental teams
- List of 2018 UCI Women's Teams

Preceded by 2017	List of UCI WorldTeams and riders 2018	Succeeded by 2019
