= List of 2020 UCI WorldTeams =

This page is a list of 2020 UCI WorldTeams. These teams competed in the 2020 UCI World Tour.

== Teams overview ==
The 19 WorldTeams in 2020 are:

2020 UCI World Teams
Code	Official Team Name	Country	Continent	Groupset	Bike Manufacture	Aero-Road Bike	Climbing/Light Weight Bike	Endurance Bike	Time Trial Bike	Wheels
ALM	AG2R La Mondiale	France	Europe	Shimano	Eddy Merckx	525 Disc	Stokeu69 Rim	N/A	N/A	Mavic
AST	Astana	Kazakhstan	Asia	Shimano	Wilier	Cento1air	Wilier 0 SLR	Cento10NDR	Turbine	Corima
TBM	Bahrain–McLaren	Bahrain	Asia	Shimano	Merida	Reacto	Scultura Disc	N/A	Warp TT	Vision
BOH	Bora–Hansgrohe	Germany	Europe	Shimano	Specialized	S-Works Tarmac SL7 Disc	S-Works Tarmac SL7 Disc	S-Works Roubaix	Shiv	Roval
CCC	CCC Team	Poland	Europe	Shimano	Giant	Propel Advanced SL Disc	TCR Advanced SL 0	N/A	Trinity Advanced Pro	Cadex
COF	Cofidis	France	Europe	Campagnolo	De Rosa	SK Pininfarina	Merak	N/A	TT-03	Fulcrum
DQT	Deceuninck–Quick-Step	Belgium	Europe	Shimano	Specialized	S-Works Venge Disc	S-Works Tarmac Disc	S-Works Roubaix	Shiv	Roval
EF1	EF Pro Cycling	United States	America	Shimano	Cannondale	System Six	Super Six Evo	Synapse	Slice	Vision
GFC	Groupama–FDJ	France	Europe	Shimano	Lapierre	Aircode SL	Xelius SL	Pulsium	Aerostorm	Shimano
ISN	Israel Start-Up Nation	Israel	Europe	Shimano	Factor	One	02 V.A.M	Vista	Slick	Black Inc
LTS	Lotto–Soudal	Belgium	Europe	Campagnolo	Ridley	Noah Fast	Helium SLX	Fenix SL	Dean Fast	Campagnolo
MTS	Mitchelton–Scott	Australia	Oceania	Shimano	Scott	Foil Disc	Addict RC Pro	Speedster	Plasma	Shimano
MOV	Movistar Team	Spain	Europe	Sram	Canyon	Aeroad CF SLX	Ultimate CF SLX	Endurace CF SLX	SpeedMax CF SLX	Zipp
NTT	NTT Pro Cycling	South Africa	Africa	Shimano	BMC	Timemachine Road	Teammachine	Roadmachine	Timemachine	Enve
IGD	Ineos Grenadiers	Great Britain	Europe	Shimano	Pinarello	Dogma F12	N/A	N/A	Bolide	Shimano
TJV	Team Jumbo–Visma	Netherlands	Europe	Shimano	Bianchi	Oltre XR4	Specialissima	Infinito CV	Aquila CV	Shimano
SUN	Team Sunweb	Germany	Europe	Shimano	Cervélo	S5 Disc	R5	C3	P5	Shimano
TFS	Trek–Segafredo	United States	America	Sram	Trek	Madone Disc	Emonda Disc	Domane Disc	Speed Concept	Bontrager
UAD	UAE Team Emirates	United Arab Emirates	Asia	Campagnolo	Colnago	Concept	V3Rs	N/A	M.Zero	Campagnolo

== See also ==
- 2020 in men's road cycling
- List of 2020 UCI Professional Continental and Continental teams
- List of 2020 UCI Women's Teams and riders

Preceded by 2019	List of UCI WorldTeams; 2020	Succeeded by 2021
