= UCI WorldTeam =

Men's professional cycling team of the highest UCI ranking (2015–)

A UCI WorldTeam (since 2015), previously UCI ProTeam (2005–2014), is the Union Cycliste Internationale's (UCI) men's cycling team of the highest category in professional road cycling—the UCI World Tour or UCI ProTour, respectively.

== List of teams (post-2025) ==
=== 2025 ===
The 18 WorldTeams in 2025 are:

2025 UCI WorldTeams
Code	Official Team Name	Country	Continent	Bike Manufacturer	Groupset
APT	Alpecin-Premier Tech	Belgium	Europe	Canyon	Shimano
ARK	Arkéa–B&B Hotels	France	Europe	Bianchi	Shimano
COF	Cofidis	France	Europe	Look	Campagnolo
DAT	Decathlon–AG2R La Mondiale	France	Europe	Van Rysel	Shimano
EFE	EF Education–EasyPost	United States	America	Cannondale	Shimano
GFC	Groupama–FDJ	France	Europe	Wilier Triestina	Shimano
IGD	Ineos Grenadiers	United Kingdom	Europe	Pinarello	Shimano
IWA	Intermarché–Wanty	Belgium	Europe	Cube	Shimano
LTK	Lidl–Trek	United States	America	Trek	SRAM
MOV	Movistar Team	Spain	Europe	Canyon	SRAM
RBH	Red Bull–Bora–Hansgrohe	Germany	Europe	Specialized	SRAM
SOQ	Soudal Quick-Step	Belgium	Europe	Specialized	Shimano
TBV	Team Bahrain Victorious	Bahrain	Asia	Merida	Shimano
TPP	Team Picnic–PostNL	Netherlands	Europe	Lapierre	Shimano
JAY	Team Jayco–AlUla	Australia	Australia	Giant	Shimano
TVL	Visma–Lease a Bike	Netherlands	Europe	Cervélo	SRAM
UAD	UAE Team Emirates XRG	United Arab Emirates	Asia	Colnago	Shimano
XAT	XDS Astana Team	Kazakhstan	Asia	X-Lab	Shimano

=== 2026 ===
The 18 WorldTeams in 2026 are:

2026 UCI WorldTeams
Code	Official Team Name	Country	Continent	Bike Manufacturer	Groupset
APC	Alpecin–Premier Tech	Belgium	Europe	Canyon	Shimano
TBV	Team Bahrain-Victorious	Bahrain	Asia	Bianchi	Shimano
DCT	Decathlon CMA CGM Team	France	Europe	Van Rysel	SRAM
EFE	EF Education–EasyPost	United States	America	Cannondale	Shimano
GFC	Groupama–FDJ United	France	Europe	Wilier Triestina	Shimano
IGD	Netcompany-Ineos Cycling Team	United Kingdom	Europe	Pinarello	Shimano
LTK	Lidl–Trek	Germany	Europe	Trek	SRAM
LOI	Lotto–Intermarché	Belgium	Europe	Orbea	Shimano
MOV	Movistar Team	Spain	Europe	Canyon	SRAM
NSN	NSN Cycling Team	Switzerland	Europe	Scott	SRAM
RBH	Red Bull–Bora–Hansgrohe	Germany	Europe	Specialized	SRAM
SOQ	Soudal Quick-Step	Belgium	Europe	Specialized	Shimano
JAY	Team Jayco–AlUla	Australia	Australia	Giant	Shimano
TPP	Team Picnic–PostNL	Netherlands	Europe	Lapierre	Shimano
TVL	Visma–Lease a Bike	Netherlands	Europe	Cervélo	SRAM
UAD	UAE Team Emirates XRG	United Arab Emirates	Asia	Colnago	Shimano
UXM	Uno-X Mobility	Norway	Europe	Ridley	SRAM
XAT	XDS Astana Team	Kazakhstan	Asia	X-Lab	Shimano

== List of teams (pre-2025) ==
=== 2011 ===
2011 UCI Pro Teams and equipment
Code	Official team name	License holder	Country	Groupset	Bicycles
ALM	Ag2r–La Mondiale (2011 season)		France	SRAM	Kuota
BMC	BMC Racing Team (2011 season)		United States	Shimano	BMC
EUS	Euskaltel–Euskadi (2011 season)		Spain	Shimano	Orbea
THR	HTC–Highroad (2011 season)		United States	Shimano	Specialized
KAT	Team Katusha (2011 season)		Russia	SRAM	Focus
LAM	Lampre–ISD (2011 season)		Italy	Campagnolo	Wilier Triestina
LEO	Leopard Trek (2011 season)		Luxembourg	Shimano	Trek
LIQ	Liquigas–Cannondale (2011 season)		Italy	Shimano	Cannondale
MOV	Movistar Team (2011 season)		Spain	Campagnolo	Pinarello
OLO	Omega Pharma–Lotto (2011 season)		Belgium	Campagnolo	Canyon
AST	Astana (2011 season)		Kazakhstan	SRAM	Specialized
QST	Quick-Step (2011 season)		Belgium	Campagnolo	Eddy Merckx
RAB	Rabobank (2011 season)		Netherlands	Shimano	Giant
SBS	Saxo Bank–SunGard (2011 season)		Denmark	SRAM	Specialized
SKY	Team Sky (2011 season)		United Kingdom	Shimano	Pinarello
GRM	Garmin–Cervélo (2011 season)		United States	SRAM	Cervélo
RSH	Team RadioShack (2011 season)		United States	SRAM	Trek
VCD	Vacansoleil–DCM (2011 season)		Netherlands	SRAM	Ridley

=== 2012 ===
2012 UCI Pro Teams and equipment
Code	Official team name	License holder	Country	Groupset	Bicycles
ALM	Ag2r–La Mondiale (2012 season)	EUSRL France Cyclisme	France	SRAM	Focus
AST	Astana (2012 season)	Olympus Sarl	Kazakhstan	Campagnolo	Specialized
BMC	BMC Racing Team (2012 season)	Continuum Sports LLC	United States	Shimano	BMC
EUS	Euskaltel–Euskadi (2012 season)	Fundación Ciclista Euskadi	Spain	Shimano	Orbea
FDJ	FDJ–BigMat (2012 season)	Société de Gestion de L'Echappée	France	Shimano	Lapierre
GRM	Garmin–Sharp (2012 season)	Slipstream Sports, LLC	United States	Shimano	Cervélo
OGE	Orica–GreenEDGE (2012 season)	Lachlan Smith	Australia	Shimano	Scott
LAM	Lampre–ISD (2012 season)	Total Cycling Limited	Italy	Shimano	Merida
CAN	Liquigas–Cannondale (2012 season)	Brixia Sports	Italy	SRAM	Cannondale
LTB	Lotto–Belisol (2012 season)	Belgian Cycling Company sa	Belgium	Campagnolo	Ridley
MOV	Movistar Team (2012 season)	Abarca Sports S.L.	Spain	Campagnolo	Pinarello
OPQ	Omega Pharma–Quick-Step (2012 season)	Esperanza bvba	Belgium	SRAM	Specialized
RAB	Rabobank (2012 season)	Rabo Wielerploegen	Netherlands	Shimano	Giant
KAT	Team Katusha (2012 season)	Katusha Management SA	Russia	Shimano	Canyon
RNT	RadioShack–Nissan (2012 season)	Leopard SA	Luxembourg	Shimano	Trek
SAX	Saxo Bank–Tinkoff Bank (2012 season)	Riis Cycling A/S	Denmark	SRAM	Specialized
SKY	Team Sky (2012 season)	Tour Racing Limited	United Kingdom	Shimano	Pinarello
VCD	Vacansoleil–DCM (2012 season)	STL–Pro Cycling B.V.	Netherlands	Shimano	Bianchi

=== 2013 ===
2013 UCI Pro Teams and equipment
Code	Official team name	License holder	Country	Groupset	Bicycles
ALM	Ag2r–La Mondiale (2013 season)	EUSRL France Cyclisme	France	SRAM	Focus
ARG	Argos–Shimano (2013 season)	SMS Cycling	Netherlands	Shimano	Felt
AST	Astana (2013 season)	Olympus Sarl	Kazakhstan	Campagnolo	Specialized
BMC	BMC Racing Team (2013 season)	Continuum Sports LLC	United States	Shimano	BMC
EUS	Euskaltel–Euskadi (2013 season)	Fundación Ciclista Euskadi	Spain	Shimano	Orbea
FDJ	FDJ.fr (2013 season)	Société de Gestion de L'Echappée	France	Shimano	Lapierre
GRM	Garmin–Sharp (2013 season)	Slipstream Sports, LLC	United States	Shimano	Cervélo
OGE	Orica–GreenEDGE (2013 season)	Lachlan Smith	Australia	Shimano	Scott
LAM	Lampre–Merida (2013 season)	Total Cycling Limited	Italy	Shimano	Merida
CAN	Cannondale (2013 season)	Brixia Sports	Italy	SRAM	Cannondale
LTB	Lotto–Belisol (2013 season)	Belgian Cycling Company sa	Belgium	Campagnolo	Ridley
MOV	Movistar Team (2013 season)	Abarca Sports S.L.	Spain	Campagnolo	Pinarello
OPQ	Omega Pharma–Quick-Step (2013 season)	Esperanza bvba	Belgium	SRAM	Specialized
BEL	Belkin Pro Cycling (2013 season)	Rabo Wielerploegen	Netherlands	Shimano	Giant
KAT	Team Katusha (2013 season)	Katusha Management SA	Russia	Shimano	Canyon
RLT	RadioShack–Leopard (2013 season)	Trek Bicycle Corporation (Note: Trek announced that it bought the license of RadioShack Leopard on 26 June 2013.)	Luxembourg	Shimano	Trek
SAX	Saxo–Tinkoff (2013 season)	Riis Cycling A/S	Denmark	SRAM	Specialized
SKY	Team Sky (2013 season)	Tour Racing Limited	United Kingdom	Shimano	Pinarello
VCD	Vacansoleil–DCM (2013 season)	STL–Pro Cycling B.V.	Netherlands	Shimano	Bianchi

=== 2014 ===
2014 UCI Pro Teams and equipment
Code	Official team name	Licence holder	Country	Groupset	Bicycles
ALM	Ag2r–La Mondiale (2014 season)	EUSRL France Cyclisme	France	Campagnolo	Focus
AST	Astana (2014 season)	Abacanto SA	Kazakhstan	Campagnolo	Specialized
BEL	Belkin Pro Cycling (2014 season)	Rabo Wielerploegen	Netherlands	Shimano	Bianchi
BMC	BMC Racing Team (2014 season)	Continuum Sports LLC	United States	Shimano	BMC
CAN	Cannondale (2014 season)	Brixia Sports	Italy	SRAM	Cannondale
EUC	Team Europcar (2014 season)	SA Vendée Cyclisme	France	Campagnolo	Colnago
FDJ	FDJ.fr (2014 season)	Société de Gestion de L'Echappée	France	Shimano	Lapierre
GIA	Giant–Shimano (2014 season)	SMS Cycling B.V.	Netherlands	Shimano	Giant
GRS	Garmin–Sharp (2014 season)	Slipstream Sports, LLC	United States	Shimano	Cervélo
KAT	Team Katusha (2014 season)	Katusha Management SA	Russia	Shimano	Canyon
LAM	Lampre–Merida (2014 season)	CGS Cycling Team AG	Italy	Shimano	Merida
LTB	Lotto–Belisol (2014 season)	Belgian Cycling Company sa	Belgium	Campagnolo	Ridley
MOV	Movistar Team (2014 season)	Abarca Sports S.L.	Spain	Campagnolo	Canyon
OGE	Orica–GreenEDGE (2014 season)	GreenEdge Cycling	Australia	Shimano	Scott
OPQ	Omega Pharma–Quick-Step (2014 season)	Esperanza bvba	Belgium	SRAM	Specialized
SKY	Team Sky (2014 season)	Tour Racing Limited	Great Britain	Shimano	Pinarello
TCS	Tinkoff–Saxo (2014 season)	Tinkoff Sport	Russia	SRAM	Specialized
TFR	Trek Factory Racing (2014 season)	Trek Bicycle Corporation	United States	Shimano	Trek

=== 2015 ===
2015 UCI World Teams and equipment
Code	Official team name	Licence holder	Country	Groupset	Bicycles
ALM	AG2R La Mondiale (2015 season)	EUSRL France Cyclisme	France	SRAM	Focus
AST	Astana (2015 season)	Abacanto SA	Kazakhstan	Campagnolo	Specialized
BMC	BMC Racing Team (2015 season)	Continuum Sports LLC	United States	Shimano	BMC
TCG	Cannondale–Garmin (2015 season)	Slipstream Sports, LLC	United States	Shimano	Cannondale
EQS	Etixx–Quick-Step (2015 season)	Esperanza bvba	Belgium	Shimano	Specialized
FDJ	FDJ (2015 season)	Société de Gestion de L'Echappée	France	Shimano	Lapierre
TGA	Team Giant–Alpecin (2015 season)	SMS Cycling B.V.	Germany	Shimano	Giant
IAM	IAM Cycling (2015 season)		Switzerland	Shimano	Scott
KAT	Team Katusha (2015 season)	Katusha Management SA	Russia	Shimano	Canyon
LAM	Lampre–Merida (2015 season)	CGS Cycling Team AG	Italy	Shimano	Merida
LTS	Lotto–Soudal (2015 season)	Belgian Cycling Company sa	Belgium	Campagnolo	Ridley
TLJ	LottoNL–Jumbo (2015 season)	Rabo Wielerploegen	Netherlands	Shimano	Bianchi
MOV	Movistar Team (2015 season)	Abarca Sports S.L.	Spain	Campagnolo	Canyon
OGE	Orica–GreenEDGE (2015 season)	GreenEdge Cycling	Australia	Shimano	Scott
SKY	Team Sky (2015 season)	Tour Racing Limited	Great Britain	Shimano	Pinarello
TCS	Tinkoff–Saxo (2015 season)	Tinkoff Sport	Russia	Shimano	Specialized
TFR	Trek Factory Racing (2015 season)	Trek Bicycle Corporation	United States	Shimano	Trek

=== 2016 ===
The 18 WorldTeams in 2016 were:

2016 UCI WorldTeams
Code	Official team name	Licence holder	Country	Groupset	Bicycles
ALM	AG2R La Mondiale (2016 season)	EUSRL France Cyclisme	France	SRAM	Focus
AST	Astana (2016 season)	Abacanto SA	Kazakhstan	Campagnolo	Specialized
BMC	BMC Racing Team (2016 season)	Continuum Sports LLC	United States	Shimano	BMC
CPT	Cannondale–Drapac (2016 season)	Slipstream Sports, LLC	United States	Shimano	Cannondale
DDD	Team Dimension Data (2016 season)		South Africa	Shimano	Cervélo
EQS	Etixx–Quick-Step (2016 season)	Esperanza bvba	Belgium	Shimano	Specialized
FDJ	FDJ (2016 season)	Société de Gestion de L'Echappée	France	Shimano	Lapierre
IAM	IAM Cycling (2016 season)		Switzerland	Shimano	Scott
LAM	Lampre–Merida (2016 season)	CGS Cycling Team AG	Italy	Shimano	Merida
LTS	Lotto–Soudal (2016 season)	Belgian Cycling Company sa	Belgium	Campagnolo	Ridley
MOV	Movistar Team (2016 season)	Abarca Sports S.L.	Spain	Campagnolo	Canyon
OGE	Orica–BikeExchange (2016 season)	GreenEdge Cycling	Australia	Shimano	Scott
TGA	Team Giant–Alpecin (2016 season)	SMS Cycling B.V.	Germany	Shimano	Giant
KAT	Team Katusha (2016 season)	Katusha Management SA	Russia	SRAM	Canyon
TLJ	LottoNL–Jumbo (2016 season)	Rabo Wielerploegen	Netherlands	Shimano	Bianchi
SKY	Team Sky (2016 season)	Tour Racing Limited	Great Britain	Shimano	Pinarello
TNK	Tinkoff (2016 season)	Tinkoff Sport	Russia	Shimano	Specialized
TFR	Trek–Segafredo (2016 season)	Trek Bicycle Corporation	United States	Shimano	Trek

=== 2017 ===
The 18 WorldTeams in 2017 were:

2017 UCI World Teams and equipment
Code	Official Team Name	Country	Groupset	Road Bike(s)	Time Trial Bike	Wheels
ALM	AG2R La Mondiale (2017 season)	France	Shimano	Factor Bikes 02; Factor Bikes ONE; Factor Bikes ONE–S	Factor Bikes Slick	Mavic
AST	Astana (2017 season)	Kazakhstan	Shimano / FSA	Argon 18 Gallium Pro; Argon 18 Nitrogen Pro	E-118 Next	Vision Wheels
TBM	Bahrain–Merida (2017 season)	Bahrain	Shimano	Merida Scultura; Merida Reacto	Merida Warp	Fulcrum
BMC	BMC Racing Team (2017 season)	United States	Shimano	BMC Teammachine SLR01; BMC Timemachine TMR01; BMC Granfondo GF01	BMC TimeMachine TM01	Shimano
BOH	Bora–Hansgrohe (2017 season)	Germany	TBC	Specialized Venge; S-Works Tarmac; Specialized Roubaix	Specialized Shiv	Roval
CDT	Cannondale–Drapac (2017 season)	United States	Shimano	Cannondale SuperSix EVO; Cannondale Synapse	Cannondale Slice	Mavic
DDD	Team Dimension Data (2017 season)	South Africa	Shimano/Rotor	Cervélo S5; Cervélo R5; Cervélo C5	Cervélo P5	Enve
FDJ	FDJ (2017 season)	France	Shimano	Lapierre Xelius SL; Lapierre Aircode SL; Lapierre Pulsium	Lapierre Aerostorm DRS	Shimano
KAT	Team Katusha–Alpecin (2017 season)	Switzerland	SRAM	Canyon Ultimate CF SLX; Canyon Aeroad CF SLX; Canyon Endurance CF SL	Canyon Speedmax CF	Zipp
TLJ	LottoNL–Jumbo (2017 season)	Netherlands	Shimano	Bianchi OltreXR2; Bianchi Specialissima; Bianchi Infinito CV	Bianchi Aquila CV	Shimano
LTS	Lotto–Soudal (2017 season)	Belgium	Campagnolo	Ridley Helium SLX; Ridley Noah SL; Ridley Fenix SL	Ridley Dean Fast	Campagnolo
MOV	Movistar Team (2017 season)	Spain	Campagnolo	Canyon Ultimate CF SLX; Canyon Aeroad CF SLX	Canyon Speedmax CF	Campagnolo
ORS	Orica–Scott (2017 season)	Australia	Shimano	Scott Foil; Scott Addict	Scott Plasma	Shimano
QST	Quick-Step Floors (2017 season)	Belgium	Shimano; FSA	Specialized Venge; S-Works Tarmac; Specialized Roubaix	Specialized Shiv	Roval; HED
SKY	Team Sky (2017 season)	Great Britain	Shimano	Pinarello Dogma F8; Pinarello Dogma K8-S	Pinarello Bolide	Shimano
SUN	Team Sunweb (2017 season)	Germany	Shimano	Giant TCR Advanced SL; Giant Propel Advanced SL; Giant Defy Advanced SL	Giant Trinity	Shimano
TFS	Trek–Segafredo (2017 season)	United States	Shimano	Trek Emonda; Trek Madone; Trek Domane	Trek SpeedConcept	Bontrager
UAD	UAE Team Emirates (2017 season)	United Arab Emirates	Campagnolo	Colnago C60; Colnago Concept; Colnago V1-R	Colnago K-Zero	Campagnolo

=== 2018 ===
The 18 WorldTeams in 2018 are:

2018 UCI World Teams and equipment
Code	Official Team Name	Country	Groupset	Road Bike(s)	Time Trial Bike	Wheels
ALM	AG2R La Mondiale (2018 season)	France	Shimano	Factor Bikes 02; Factor Bikes ONE; Factor Bikes ONE–S	Factor Bikes Slick	Mavic
AST	Astana (2018 season)	Kazakhstan	Shimano	Argon 18 Gallium Pro; Argon 18 Nitrogen Pro; Argon Krypton	E-118 Next	Corima
TBM	Bahrain–Merida (2018 season)	Bahrain	Shimano	Merida Scultura; Merida Reacto	Merida Warp	Fulcrum
BMC	BMC Racing Team (2018 season)	United States	Shimano	BMC Teammachine SLR01; BMC Timemachine TMR01; BMC Roadmachine RM01	BMC TimeMachine TM01	Shimano
BOH	Bora–Hansgrohe (2018 season)	Germany	Shimano	S-Works Venge; S-Works Tarmac; S-Works Roubaix	S-Works Shiv	Roval
DDD	Team Dimension Data (2018 season)	South Africa	Shimano/Rotor	Cervélo S5; Cervélo R5; Cervélo C5	Cervélo P5	Enve
EFD	EF Education First–Drapac p/b Cannondale (2018 season)	United States	Shimano/FSA	Cannondale SuperSix EVO Hi-Mod; Cannondale Synapse Hi-Mod; Cannondale SystemSix Hi-Mod	Cannondale Slice Hi-Mod	Vision
FDJ	Groupama–FDJ (2018 season)	France	Shimano	Lapierre Xelius SL; Lapierre Aircode SL; Lapierre Pulsium	Lapierre Aerostorm DRS	Shimano
TKA	Team Katusha–Alpecin (2018 season)	Switzerland	SRAM	Canyon Ultimate CF SLX; Canyon Aeroad CF SLX; Canyon Endurance CF SL	Canyon Speedmax CF	Zipp
TLJ	LottoNL–Jumbo (2018 season)	Netherlands	Shimano	Bianchi OltreXR2; Bianchi Specialissima; Bianchi Aria	Bianchi Aquila CV	Shimano
LTS	Lotto–Soudal (2018 season)	Belgium	Campagnolo	Ridley Helium SLX; Ridley Noah SL; Ridley Fenix SL	Ridley Dean Fast	Campagnolo
MTS	Mitchelton-Scott (2018 season)	Australia	Shimano	Scott Foil; Scott Addict	Scott Plasma	Shimano
MOV	Movistar Team (2018 season)	Spain	Campagnolo	Canyon Ultimate CF SLX; Canyon Aeroad CF SLX; Canyon Endurance CF SL	Canyon Speedmax CF	Campagnolo
QST	Quick-Step Floors (2018 season)	Belgium	Shimano/FSA	S-Works Venge; S-Works Tarmac; S-Works Roubaix	S-Works Shiv	Roval; HED
SKY	Team Sky (2018 season)	Great Britain	Shimano	Pinarello Dogma F10; Pinarello Dogma K8-S; Pinarello GAN	Pinarello Bolide	Shimano
SUN	Team Sunweb (2018 season)	Germany	Shimano	Giant TCR Advanced SL; Giant Propel Advanced SL; Giant Defy Advanced SL	Giant Trinity	Giant
TFS	Trek–Segafredo (2018 season)	United States	Shimano	Trek Emonda; Trek Madone; Trek Domane	Trek SpeedConcept	Bontrager
UAD	UAE Team Emirates (2018 season)	United Arab Emirates	Campagnolo	Colnago C60; Colnago Concept; Colnago V1-R	Colnago K-Zero	Campagnolo

=== 2019 ===
The 18 WorldTeams in 2019 are:

2019 UCI World Teams and equipment
Code	Official Team Name	Country	Groupset	Road Bike(s)	Time Trial Bike	Wheels
ALM	AG2R La Mondiale (2019 season)	France	Campagnolo	Eddy Merckx EM25	Eddy Merckx	Mavic
AST	Astana (2019 season)	Kazakhstan	Shimano/FSA	Argon 18 Gallium Pro; Argon 18 Nitrogen Pro; Argon Krypton	E-118 Next	Vision
TBM	Bahrain–Merida (2019 season)	Bahrain	Shimano	Merida Scultura; Merida Reacto	Merida Warp TT	Fulcrum
BOH	Bora–Hansgrohe (2019 season)	Germany	Shimano	S-Works Venge; S-Works Tarmac; S-Works Roubaix	S-Works Shiv	Roval
CPT	CCC Team (2019 season)	Poland	Shimano	Giant TCR Advanced SL 0 Giant Propel Advanced SL; Giant Defy Advanced SL	Giant Trinity Advanced Pro	Giant
DQT	Deceuninck–Quick-Step (2019 season)	Belgium	Shimano	S-Works Venge; S-Works Tarmac; S-Works Roubaix	S-Works Shiv	Roval
EF1	EF Education First (2019 season)	United States	Shimano/FSA	Cannondale SuperSix EVO; Cannondale Synapse; Cannondale SystemSix	Cannondale Slice	Vision
GFC	Groupama–FDJ (2019 season)	France	Shimano	Lapierre Xelius SL; Lapierre Aircode SL; Lapierre Pulsium	Lapierre Aerostorm	Shimano
LTS	Lotto–Soudal (2019 season)	Belgium	Campagnolo	Ridley Helium SLX; Ridley Noah Fast; Ridley Fenix SLX	Ridley Dean Fast	Campagnolo
MTS	Mitchelton–Scott (2019 season)	Australia	Shimano	Scott Foil; Scott Addict; Scott Speedster	Scott Plasma	Shimano
MOV	Movistar Team (2019 season)	Spain	Campagnolo	Canyon Ultimate CF SLX; Canyon Aeroad CF SLX; Canyon Endurace CF SLX	Canyon Speedmax CF SLX	Campagnolo
TDD	Team Dimension Data (2019 season)	South Africa	Shimano	BMC Teammachine SLR01; BMC Timemachine; BMC Roadmachine	BMC Timemachine 01	Enve
TJV	Team Jumbo–Visma (2019 season)	Netherlands	Shimano	Bianchi Oltre XR4; Bianchi Specialissima; Bianchi Infinito CV	Bianchi Aquila CV	Shimano
TKA	Team Katusha–Alpecin (2019 season)	Switzerland	SRAM	Canyon Ultimate CF SLX; Canyon Aeroad CF SLX; Canyon Endurace CF SLX	Canyon Speedmax CF SLX	Zipp
INS	Team INEOS (2019 season)	Great Britain	Shimano	Pinarello Dogma F12; Pinarello Dogma FS	Pinarello Bolide	Shimano
SUN	Team Sunweb (2019 season)	Germany	Shimano	Cervélo S5; Cervélo R5; Cervélo C3	Cervélo P5	Shimano
TFS	Trek–Segafredo (2019 season)	United States	SRAM	Trek Emonda; Trek Madone; Trek Domane SLR	Trek Speed Concept	Bontrager
UAD	UAE Team Emirates (2019 season)	United Arab Emirates	Campagnolo	Colnago V2R; Colnago Concept; Colnago C64	Colnago M.Zero	Campagnolo

=== 2020 ===
The 19 WorldTeams in 2020 are:

2020 UCI World Teams
Code	Official Team Name	Country	Continent	Groupset	Bike Manufacture	Aero-Road Bike	Climbing/Light Weight Bike	Endurance Bike	Time Trial Bike	Wheels
ALM	AG2R La Mondiale	France	Europe	Shimano	Eddy Merckx	525 Disc	Stokeu69 Rim	N/A	N/A	Mavic
AST	Astana	Kazakhstan	Asia	Shimano	Wilier	Cento1air	Wilier 0 SLR	Cento10NDR	Turbine	Corima
TBM	Bahrain–McLaren	Bahrain	Asia	Shimano	Merida	Reacto	Scultura Disc	N/A	Warp TT	Vision
BOH	Bora–Hansgrohe	Germany	Europe	Shimano	Specialized	S-Works Tarmac SL7 Disc	S-Works Tarmac SL7 Disc	S-Works Roubaix	Shiv	Roval
CCC	CCC Team	Poland	Europe	Shimano	Giant	Propel Advanced SL Disc	TCR Advanced SL 0	N/A	Trinity Advanced Pro	Cadex
COF	Cofidis	France	Europe	Campagnolo	De Rosa	SK Pininfarina	Merak	N/A	TT-03	Fulcrum
DQT	Deceuninck–Quick-Step	Belgium	Europe	Shimano	Specialized	S-Works Venge Disc	S-Works Tarmac Disc	S-Works Roubaix	Shiv	Roval
EF1	EF Pro Cycling	United States	America	Shimano	Cannondale	System Six	Super Six Evo	Synapse	Slice	Vision
GFC	Groupama–FDJ	France	Europe	Shimano	Lapierre	Aircode SL	Xelius SL	Pulsium	Aerostorm	Shimano
ISN	Israel Start-Up Nation	Israel	Europe	Shimano	Factor	One	02 V.A.M	Vista	Slick	Black Inc
LTS	Lotto–Soudal	Belgium	Europe	Campagnolo	Ridley	Noah Fast	Helium SLX	Fenix SL	Dean Fast	Campagnolo
MTS	Mitchelton–Scott	Australia	Oceania	Shimano	Scott	Foil Disc	Addict RC Pro	Speedster	Plasma	Shimano
MOV	Movistar Team	Spain	Europe	Sram	Canyon	Aeroad CF SLX	Ultimate CF SLX	Endurace CF SLX	SpeedMax CF SLX	Zipp
NTT	NTT Pro Cycling	South Africa	Africa	Shimano	BMC	Timemachine Road	Teammachine	Roadmachine	Timemachine	Enve
IGD	INEOS Grenadiers	Great Britain	Europe	Shimano	Pinarello	Dogma F12	N/A	N/A	Bolide	Shimano
TJV	Team Jumbo–Visma	Netherlands	Europe	Shimano	Bianchi	Oltre XR4	Specialissima	Infinito CV	Aquila CV	Shimano
SUN	Team Sunweb	Germany	Europe	Shimano	Cervélo	S5 Disc	R5	C3	P5	Shimano
TFS	Trek–Segafredo	United States	America	Sram	Trek	Madone Disc	Emonda Disc	Domane Disc	Speed Concept	Bontrager
UAD	UAE Team Emirates	United Arab Emirates	Asia	Campagnolo	Colnago	Concept	V3Rs	N/A	M.Zero	Campagnolo

=== 2021 ===
The 19 WorldTeams in 2021 are:

2021 UCI World Teams
Code	Official Team Name	Country	Continent	Groupset	Bike Manufacturer	Road Bike(s)	Time Trial Bike	Wheels
ACT	AG2R Citroën Team	France	Europe	Campagnolo	BMC	Teammachine SLR01; Timemachine Road	Timemachine	Campagnolo
APT	Astana–Premier Tech	Kazakhstan	Asia	Shimano	Wilier	Filante SLR; 0 SLR	Turbine	Corima
BOH	Bora–Hansgrohe	Germany	Europe	Shimano	Specialized	S-Works Tarmac SL7; S-Works Roubaix	S-Works SHIV TT DISC	Roval
COF	Cofidis	France	Europe	Campagnolo	De Rosa	SK Pininfarina; Merak	TT-03	Fulcrum
DQT	Deceuninck–Quick-Step	Belgium	Europe	Shimano	Specialized	S-Works Tarmac SL7; S-Works Roubaix	S-Works SHIV TT DISC	Roval
EFN	EF Education–Nippo	United States	America	Shimano	Cannondale	System Six; Super Six Evo	Slice	Vision
GFC	Groupama–FDJ	France	Europe	Shimano	Lapierre	Aircode DRS; Xelius SL	Aerostorm	Shimano
IGD	INEOS Grenadiers	Great Britain	Europe	Shimano	Pinarello	Dogma F12; Dogma F	Bolide TT	Shimano
IWG	Intermarché–Wanty–Gobert Matériaux	Belgium	Europe	Shimano	Cube	Litening C:68X	AERIUM TT	Newmen
ISN	Israel Start-Up Nation	Israel	Asia	Shimano	Factor	Ostro VAM; ONE Disc; 02 VAM	SLiCK Disc	Black Inc
LTS	Lotto–Soudal	Belgium	Europe	Campagnolo	Ridley	Noah Fast Disc; Helium SLX Disc	Dean Fast	Campagnolo
MOV	Movistar Team	Spain	Europe	SRAM	Canyon	Ultimate CF SLX Team MOV; Aeroad CF Team MOV	Speedmax CF Team MOV	Zipp
TBV	Team Bahrain Victorious	Bahrain	Asia	Shimano	Merida	Reacto; Scultura	Warp TT	Vision
BEX	Team BikeExchange	Australia	Oceania	Shimano	Bianchi	Specialissima disc Oltre XR4 disc	Aquila	Shimano
DSM	Team DSM	Germany	Europe	Shimano	Scott	Addict RC; Foil	Plasma	Shimano
TJV	Team Jumbo–Visma	Netherlands	Europe	Shimano	Cervélo	S5; R5; Caledonia	P5	Shimano
TQA	Team Qhubeka NextHash	South Africa	Africa	Shimano	BMC	Timemachine Road; Teammachine	Timemachine	Hunt
TFS	Trek–Segafredo	United States	America	Sram	Trek	Madone Disc; Emonda Disc; Domane Disc	Speed Concept	Bontrager
UAD	UAE Team Emirates	United Arab Emirates	Asia	Campagnolo	Colnago	Concept; C64; V3Rs	Kone	Campagnolo

=== 2022 ===
The 18 WorldTeams in 2022 are:

2022 UCI World Teams
Code	Official Team Name	Country	Continent	Groupset	Bike Manufacturer	Road Bike(s)	Time Trial Bike	Wheels
ACT	AG2R Citroën Team	France	Europe	Campagnolo	BMC	Teammachine SLR01; Timemachine Road	Timemachine	Campagnolo
AST	Astana Qazaqstan Team	Kazakhstan	Asia	Shimano	Wilier	Filante SLR; 0 SLR		Corima
BOH	Bora–Hansgrohe	Germany	Europe	Shimano	Specialized			Roval
COF	Cofidis	France	Europe	Campagnolo	De Rosa			Corima
EFE	EF Education–EasyPost	United States	North America	Shimano	Cannondale			Vision
GFC	Groupama–FDJ	France	Europe	Shimano	Lapierre			Shimano
IGD	INEOS Grenadiers	Great Britain	Europe	Shimano	Pinarello			Shimano
IWG	Intermarché–Wanty–Gobert Matériaux	Belgium	Europe	Shimano	Cube			Newmen
IPT	Israel–Premier Tech	Israel	Asia	Shimano	Factor			Black Inc
LTS	Lotto–Soudal	Belgium	Europe	Shimano	Ridley			DT Swiss
MOV	Movistar Team	Spain	Europe	SRAM	Canyon			Zipp
QST	Quick-Step Alpha Vinyl Team	Belgium	Europe	Shimano	Specialized	S-Works Tarmac SL7; S-Works Roubaix	S-Works SHIV TT DISC	Roval
TBV	Team Bahrain Victorious	Bahrain	Asia	Shimano	Merida			Vision
BEX	Team BikeExchange–Jayco	Australia	Oceania	Shimano	Giant			Cadex
DSM	Team DSM	Netherlands	Europe	Shimano	Scott			Shimano
TJV	Team Jumbo–Visma	Netherlands	Europe	Shimano	Cervélo			Shimano
TFS	Trek–Segafredo	United States	North America	SRAM	Trek			Bontrager
UAD	UAE Team Emirates	United Arab Emirates	Asia	Campagnolo	Colnago			Campagnolo

=== 2023 ===
The 18 WorldTeams in 2023 are:

- AG2R Citroën Team
- Alpecin–Deceuninck
- Arkéa–Samsic
- Astana Qazaqstan Team
- Bora–Hansgrohe
- Cofidis
- EF Education–EasyPost
- Groupama–FDJ
- INEOS Grenadiers
- Intermarché–Circus–Wanty
- Lidl–Trek
- Movistar Team
- Soudal–Quick-Step
- Team Bahrain Victorious
- Team dsm–firmenich
- Team Jayco–AlUla
- Team Jumbo–Visma
- UAE Team Emirates

=== 2024 ===
The 18 WorldTeams in 2024 are:

- Alpecin–Deceuninck
- Arkéa–B&B Hotels
- Astana Qazaqstan Team
- Bora–Hansgrohe
- Cofidis
- Decathlon–AG2R La Mondiale
- EF Education–EasyPost
- Groupama–FDJ
- INEOS Grenadiers
- Intermarché–Wanty
- Lidl–Trek
- Movistar Team
- Soudal–Quick-Step
- Team Bahrain Victorious
- Team dsm–firmenich PostNL
- Team Jayco–AlUla
- Visma–Lease a Bike
- UAE Team Emirates

== History of UCI WorldTeams ==
Dark grey indicates that the team was not operating in the year in question.
Light blue indicates that the team was competing at a lower level in the year in question.

2009	2010	2011	2012	2013	2014	2015	2016	2017	2018	2019	2020	2021	2022	2023	2024	2025
BKCP–Powerplus							BKCP–Corendon; Beobank–Corendon	Beobank–Corendon	Corendon–Circus		Alpecin–Fenix		Alpecin–Fenix; Alpecin–Deceuninck	Alpecin–Deceuninck		
Bretagne–Schuller				Bretagne–Séché Environnement			Fortuneo–Vital Concept	Fortuneo–Vital Concept; Fortuneo–Oscaro	Fortuneo–Samsic	Arkéa–Samsic				Arkéa–Samsic	Arkéa–B&B Hotels	
								Bahrain–Merida			Bahrain–McLaren	Team Bahrain Victorious				
Cofidis	Cofidis										Cofidis					
Ag2r–La Mondiale						AG2R La Mondiale						AG2R Citroën Team			Decathlon–AG2R La Mondiale	
Garmin–Slipstream	Garmin–Transitions	Garmin–Cervélo	Garmin–Barracuda; Garmin–Sharp	Garmin–Sharp		Cannondale–Garmin	Cannondale; Cannondale–Drapac	Cannondale–Drapac	EF Education First–Drapac p/b Cannondale	EF Education First	EF Pro Cycling	EF Education–Nippo	EF Education–EasyPost			
Française des Jeux	Française des Jeux; FDJ	FDJ	FDJ–BigMat	FDJ; FDJ.fr	FDJ.fr	FDJ			FDJ; Groupama–FDJ	Groupama–FDJ						
	Team Sky									Team Sky; Team INEOS	Team INEOS; INEOS Grenadiers	INEOS Grenadiers				
Verandas Willems		Veranda's Willems–Accent	Accent.jobs–Willems Veranda's	Accent Jobs–Wanty	Wanty–Groupe Gobert					Wanty–Gobert	Circus–Wanty Gobert	Intermarché–Wanty–Gobert Matériaux		Intermarché–Circus–Wanty	Intermarché–Wanty	
						Cycling Academy		Israel Cycling Academy			Israel Start-Up Nation		Israel–Premier Tech	Israel–Premier Tech		
			GreenEDGE; Orica–GreenEDGE	Orica–GreenEDGE			Orica–GreenEDGE; Orica–BikeExchange	Orica–Scott	Mitchelton–Scott			Team BikeExchange	Team BikeExchange–Jayco	Team Jayco–AlUla		
		Leopard Trek	RadioShack–Nissan	RadioShack–Leopard	Trek Factory Racing		Trek–Segafredo							Trek–Segafredo; Lidl–Trek	Lidl–Trek	
Silence–Lotto	Omega Pharma–Lotto		Lotto–Belisol			Lotto–Soudal								Lotto–Dstny		Lotto
Caisse d'Epargne		Movistar Team														
Skil–Shimano			Project 1t4i Argos–Shimano	Argos–Shimano	Giant–Shimano	Team Giant–Alpecin		Team Sunweb				Team DSM		Team DSM; Team dsm–firmenich	Team dsm–firmenich PostNL	Team Picnic–PostNL
	Team NetApp			NetApp–Endura		Bora–Argon 18		Bora–Hansgrohe							Bora–Hansgrohe; Red Bull–Bora–Hansgrohe	Red Bull–Bora–Hansgrohe
Quick-Step			Omega Pharma–Quick-Step			Etixx–Quick-Step		Quick-Step Floors		Deceuninck–Quick-Step			Quick-Step Alpha Vinyl Team	Soudal–Quick-Step		
Bbox Bouygues Telecom	Bbox Bouygues Telecom	Team Europcar			Team Europcar	Team Europcar	Direct Énergie			Direct Énergie, Total Direct Énergie	Total Direct Énergie	Total Direct Énergie, Team TotalEnergies	Team TotalEnergies			
Lampre–NGC	Lampre–Farnese Vini, Lampre–Farnese	Lampre–ISD		Lampre–Merida				UAE Abu Dhabi, UAE Team Emirates	UAE Team Emirates							UAE Team Emirates XRG
Rabobank				Blanco Pro Cycling; Belkin Pro Cycling	Belkin Pro Cycling	LottoNL–Jumbo				Team Jumbo–Visma					Visma–Lease a Bike	
Astana												Astana–Premier Tech	Astana Qazaqstan Team			XDS Astana Team
MTN Cycling	MTN–Energade	MTN–Qhubeka					Team Dimension Data				NTT Pro Cycling	Team Qhubeka Assos, Team Qhubeka NextHash				
BMC Racing Team		BMC Racing Team								CCC Team						
Team Katusha								Team Katusha–Alpecin								
				IAM Cycling		IAM Cycling										
Team Saxo Bank		Saxo Bank–SunGard	Team Saxo Bank, Saxo Bank–Tinkoff Bank	Saxo–Tinkoff	Tinkoff–Saxo		Tinkoff									
Liquigas, Liquigas–Doimo	Liquigas–Doimo	Liquigas–Cannondale		Cannondale												
Euskaltel–Euskadi																
Vacansoleil		Vacansoleil–DCM														
Fuji–Servetto	Footon–Servetto–Fuji	Geox–TMC														
Team Columbia–High Road, Team Columbia–HTC	Team HTC–Columbia	HTC–Highroad														
	Team RadioShack															
Team Milram																

== See also ==
- UCI Women's Team
