= 2019 Lotto–Soudal season =

Lotto–Soudal
- 2019 season
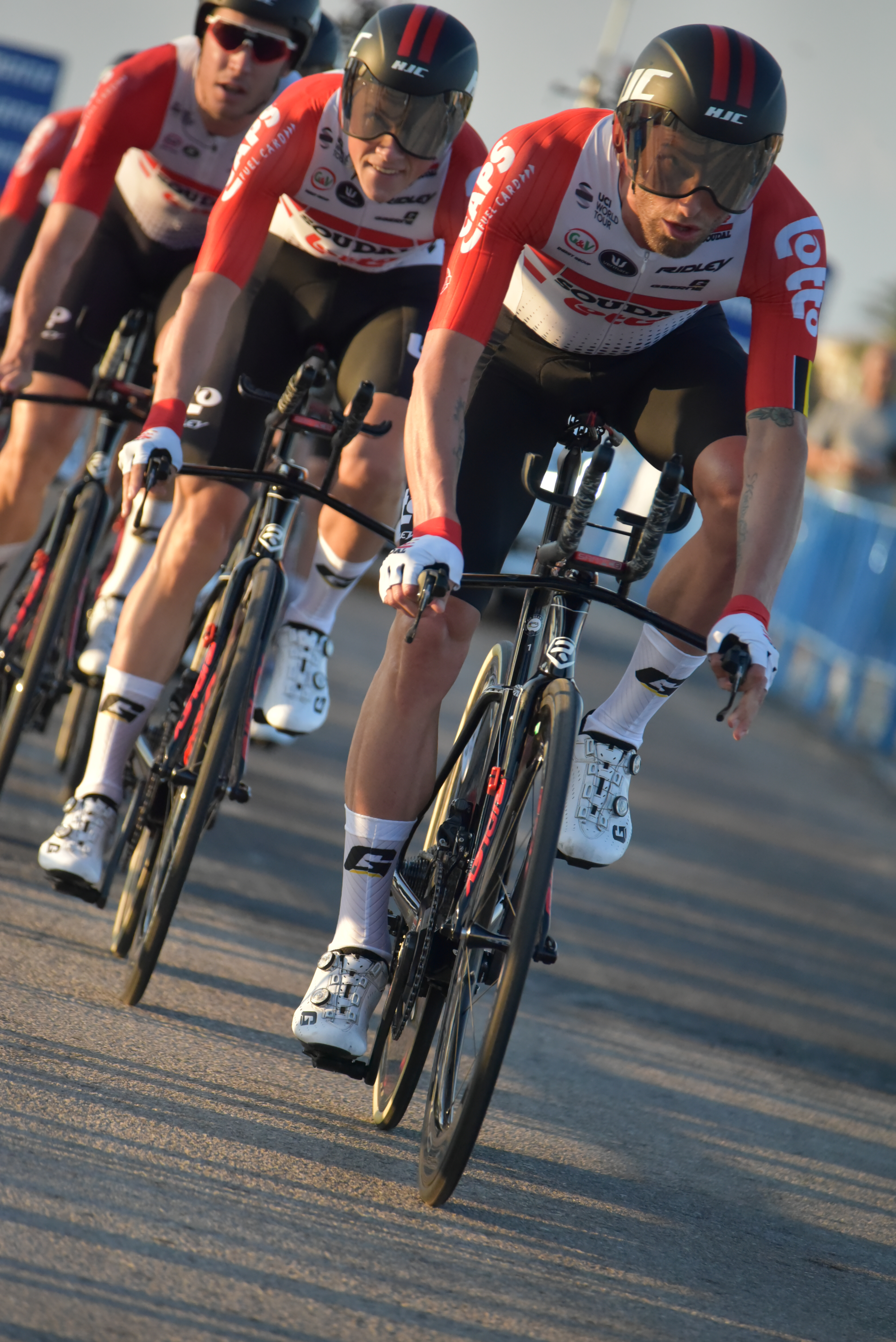
- Lotto–Soudal during Stage 1 of the Vuelta a España
- UCI code: LTS
- Status: UCI WorldTeam
- Manager: Marc Sergeant
- Main sponsor(s): Soudal
- Based: Belgium
- Bicycles: Ridley
- Groupset: Campagnolo

Season victories
- One-day races: 1
- Stage race stages: 14

The 2019 season for the Lotto–Soudal cycling team began in January at the Tour Down Under. As a UCI WorldTeam, they were automatically invited and obligated to send a squad to every event in the UCI World Tour.

== Team roster ==
As of 5 August 2019.

Rider	Date of birth
Sander Armée (BEL)	10 December 1985 (aged 33)
Tiesj Benoot (BEL)	11 March 1994 (aged 25)
Adam Blythe (GBR)	1 October 1989 (aged 29)
Victor Campenaerts (BEL)	28 October 1991 (aged 27)
Jasper De Buyst (BEL)	24 November 1993 (aged 25)
Thomas De Gendt (BEL)	6 November 1986 (aged 32)
Stan Dewulf (BEL)	20 December 1997 (aged 21)
Caleb Ewan (AUS)	11 July 1994 (aged 25)
Frederik Frison (BEL)	28 July 1992 (aged 27)
Carl Fredrik Hagen (NOR)	26 September 1991 (aged 27)
Adam Hansen (AUS)	11 May 1981 (aged 38)
Rasmus Byriel Iversen (DEN)	16 September 1997 (aged 21)
Jens Keukeleire (BEL)	23 November 1988 (aged 30)
Roger Kluge (GER)	5 February 1986 (aged 33)

Rider	Date of birth
Bjorg Lambrecht (Note: Lambrecht died on August 5 as a result of a crash during the Tour de Pologne.) (BEL)	2 April 1997 (aged 22)
Nikolas Maes (BEL)	9 April 1986 (aged 33)
Tomasz Marczyński (POL)	6 March 1984 (aged 35)
Rémy Mertz (BEL)	17 July 1995 (aged 24)
Maxime Monfort (BEL)	14 January 1983 (aged 36)
Lawrence Naesen (BEL)	28 August 1992 (aged 26)
Tosh Van der Sande (BEL)	28 November 1990 (aged 28)
Brian van Goethem (NED)	16 April 1991 (aged 28)
Jelle Vanendert (BEL)	19 February 1985 (aged 34)
Harm Vanhoucke (BEL)	17 June 1997 (aged 22)
Jelle Wallays (BEL)	11 May 1989 (aged 30)
Tim Wellens (BEL)	10 May 1991 (aged 28)
Enzo Wouters (BEL)	21 March 1996 (aged 23)

Riders who joined the team for the 2019 season

Rider	2018 team
Adam Blythe	Aqua Blue Sport
Stan Dewulf	Neo-Pro
Caleb Ewan	Mitchelton–Scott
Carl Fredrik Hagen	Joker Icopal
Roger Kluge	Mitchelton–Scott
Rasmus Byriel Iversen	Team Giant–Castelli
Brian van Goethem	General Store Bottoli Zardini

Riders who left the team during or after the 2018 season

Rider	2019 team
Lars Ytting Bak	Team Dimension Data
Jens Debusschere	Team Katusha–Alpecin
André Greipel	Arkéa–Samsic
Moreno Hofland	EF Education First
James Shaw	Swift Carbon Pro Cycling
Marcel Sieberg	Bahrain–Merida

== Season victories ==
Date	Race	Competition	Rider	Country	Location
2 February	Trofeo de Tramuntana	UCI Europe Tour	Tim Wellens (BEL)	Spain	Deià
20 February	Vuelta a Andalucía, Stage 1	UCI Europe Tour	Tim Wellens (BEL)	Spain	Alcalá de los Gazules
22 February	Vuelta a Andalucía, Stage 3	UCI Europe Tour	Tim Wellens (BEL)	Spain	La Guardia de Jaén
24 February	Vuelta a Andalucía, Points classification	UCI Europe Tour	Tim Wellens (BEL)	Spain	
27 February	UAE Tour, Stage 4	UCI World Tour	Caleb Ewan (AUS)	United Arab Emirates	Hatta Dam
17 March	Paris–Nice, Mountains classification	UCI World Tour	Thomas De Gendt (BEL)	France	
19 March	Tirreno–Adriatico, Stage 7	UCI World Tour	Victor Campenaerts (BEL)	Italy	San Benedetto del Tronto
25 March	Volta a Catalunya, Stage 1	UCI World Tour	Thomas De Gendt (BEL)	Spain	Calella
31 March	Volta a Catalunya, Mountains classification	UCI World Tour	Thomas De Gendt (BEL)	Spain	
19 April	Presidential Tour of Turkey, Stage 4	UCI World Tour	Caleb Ewan (AUS)	Turkey	Bursa
21 April	Presidential Tour of Turkey, Stage 6	UCI World Tour	Caleb Ewan (AUS)	Turkey	Istanbul
18 May	Giro d'Italia, Stage 8	UCI World Tour	Caleb Ewan (AUS)	Italy	Pesaro
22 May	Giro d'Italia, Stage 11	UCI World Tour	Caleb Ewan (AUS)	Italy	Novi Ligure
2 June	Tour of Norway, Teams classification	UCI Europe Tour	(Note: The winning riders were Carl Fredrik Hagen, Sander Armée, Bjorg Lambrecht, Nikolas Maes, Lawrence Naesen and Tim Wellens)	Norway	
13 July	Tour de France, Stage 8	UCI World Tour	Thomas de Gendt (BEL)	France	Saint-Étienne
17 July	Tour de France, Stage 11	UCI World Tour	Caleb Ewan (AUS)	France	Toulouse
23 July	Tour de France, Stage 16	UCI World Tour	Caleb Ewan (AUS)	France	Nîmes
28 July	Tour de France, Stage 21	UCI World Tour	Caleb Ewan (AUS)	France	Paris
31 July	Tour de Wallonie, Stage 5	UCI Europe Tour	Tosh van der Sande (BEL)	Belgium	Thuin

== National, Continental and World champions ==
Date	Discipline	Jersey	Rider	Country	Location
