= Epowers Factory Team =

Team information
- UCI code: EFT
- Registered: Hungary
- Founded: 2020
- Discipline: Road
- Status: UCI Professional Continental
- Bicycles: Ridley

Team name history
- 2020: Epowers Factory Team

Epowers Factory Team was an attempted Hungarian-Italian UCI Professional Continental cycling team, which would have been active for the 2020 season. The team was not able to get the sponsors required to be active in the peloton in 2020, the team had been disestablished.
