= Keith Bontrager =

American cyclist

Keith Bontrager (/bɒnˈtreɪɡər/; born December 18, 1954) is a motorcycle racer who became a pioneer in the development of the modern mountain bike. Between 1980 and 1995, he was president of his own Bontrager Company, which continues to develop components for Trek Bicycle Corporation after Trek bought out Bontrager.

== Career ==
=== Motorcycles ===
Bontrager started in 1965 by building lawnmower engine powered mini-bikes.

In 1969, he began racing motocross, funding his racing through motorcycle repair work. Between 1975 and 1981 he designed, built and tuned motocross, road racing and drag racing motorcycles. Motorcycles he tuned won national road racing titles in production and 250 GP classes.

=== Bicycles ===
In 1978, Bontrager became attracted to cycling and in 1979, he built his first road bike. With his motocross background he was attracted to mountain bike cycling. In 1980, he built his first mountain bike frame and founded Bontrager Cycles in Sunnyvale, California.

In 1984, he cut 700C (ISO 622) 36-hole Mavic MA-2 road rims to the circumference of a 26" rim, re-rolling them to create a 32-hole 26" rim.

Bontrager rims were the first lightweight yet strong mountain bike rims, albeit using a profile intended for road racing bicycles. Mavic provided MA-40 MTB rims for some time. Bontrager went on designing lightweight rims, manufactured by Weinmann USA. Several were introduced but never went into high production because the Weinmann factory suffered a fire.

The design of Bontrager frames was based on his studies at the University of California, Santa Cruz and experience as a motocross mechanic. While other manufacturers developed frames out of (oversized) aluminium, titanium, or carbon-fibre, Bontrager believed steel was not outdated but that its design and production could be improved. Joints could be strengthened by gussets to distribute loads and reduce the weakening of brazing and welding. He found areas in which joints could be made by bonding and riveting, i.e. the frames made between 1989 and 1994 had cable stops milled out of aluminum that were bonded and riveted to the top tube. Frames made at Bontrager's Santa Cruz workshop had two-piece seat stays made of larger diameter tubing in the upper area which added torsional stiffness around the brake-bosses, while the smaller tubes in the lower area reduced weight and vertical stiffness of the rear triangle leading to better damping of hits.

Bontrager published articles on bicycle design and construction, ranging from the effects of TIG welding on the tubes to the flaws in the accepted sizing methods of the day.

In 1987, he designed and patented the composite fork crown. This used an aluminum fork crown that clamped the fork blades and the steerer instead of using welds or brazing. This design was used on the Rock Shox RS1 suspension fork, and Bontrager's own rigid fork, the Switchblade. Bontrager's versions of the Switchblade with bonded and riveted dropouts and brake bosses led to a fork with no welding or brazing, thus retaining the strength gained by tempering the tubing.

In 1992, Bontrager Cycles expanded from a one-man shop to a limited production facility. In 1993, they started to produce handlebar stems. In 1995, Bontrager's business partner, Hans Heim, left to join Santa Cruz Bicycles, and put his share of Bontrager Cycles up for sale. Trek acquired Bontrager Cycles and hired Bontrager as president.

Bontrager production split in two. The frameshop in Santa Cruz continued to manufacture the high-end mountain bike frames (the Race and Race Lite models), the Road Lite (road race), the cyclo-cross frames, and later a BMX frame. At this same time, Bontrager stopped using two-piece seat stays on mountain frames in favor of a single tapered tube. The Ti Lite, a titanium version of the mountain bike frame, was made by tubing manufacturer Sandvik. At the same time, the Privateer, an entry-level frame, was designed using the same True Temper tubing as the Santa Cruz-made-frames but made at Trek's plant in Waterloo, Wisconsin, with small design changes.

Bontrager took on product development at Trek, designing handlebars, handlebar stems, bar ends, seatposts, tires, cranksets and rims and wheels.

By the end of the 1990s, improved production techniques for aluminium frames allowed them to be produced less expensively, and hardtail steel frames went out of fashion. Production of Bontrager frames ceased in Santa Cruz and Wisconsin.

Bontrager continues to work with Trek to develop wheels and components for mountain, road and triathlon bikes. The components were used by the US Postal, Discovery Channel, Leopard Trek, Trek Livestrong, Science in Sport and Trek VW road cycling teams. Triathletes and Ironman champions have used the components and these include Chris Lieto, Normann Stadler and Julie Dibens - to name but a few.

=== Cycling ===
Bontrager has competed in many mountain bike races, including 24-hour races. He has also competed in the Three Peaks Cyclo-Cross event in England, as well as stage races such as the Trans-Sylvania Mountain Bike Epic in State College, PA.

== Education ==
Bontrager majored in physics at UCSC.

== Awards and recognition ==
Bontrager was inducted into the Mountain Bike Hall of Fame in 1994.
