= Argon 18 =

Canadian cycle manufacturer

Argon 18 Inc.
- Company type: Private
- Industry: Bicycles
- Founded: 1989
- Headquarters: Montreal, Quebec; Canada
- Products: Bicycle and Related Components
- Website: www.argon18.com

Argon 18 is a Canadian cycle manufacturer founded in 1989 in Montreal, Quebec by Gervais Rioux. The name is derived from the element Argon, which is number 18 on the periodic table of elements. Argon 18 bikes are distributed in more than 70 countries. Argon 18 also sponsors professional cycling teams and professional triathletes.

In June 2017, they became the official supplier to Canada's national road, track and para-cycling cycling teams, through the 2020 Olympic Games.

== Cycle technology ==
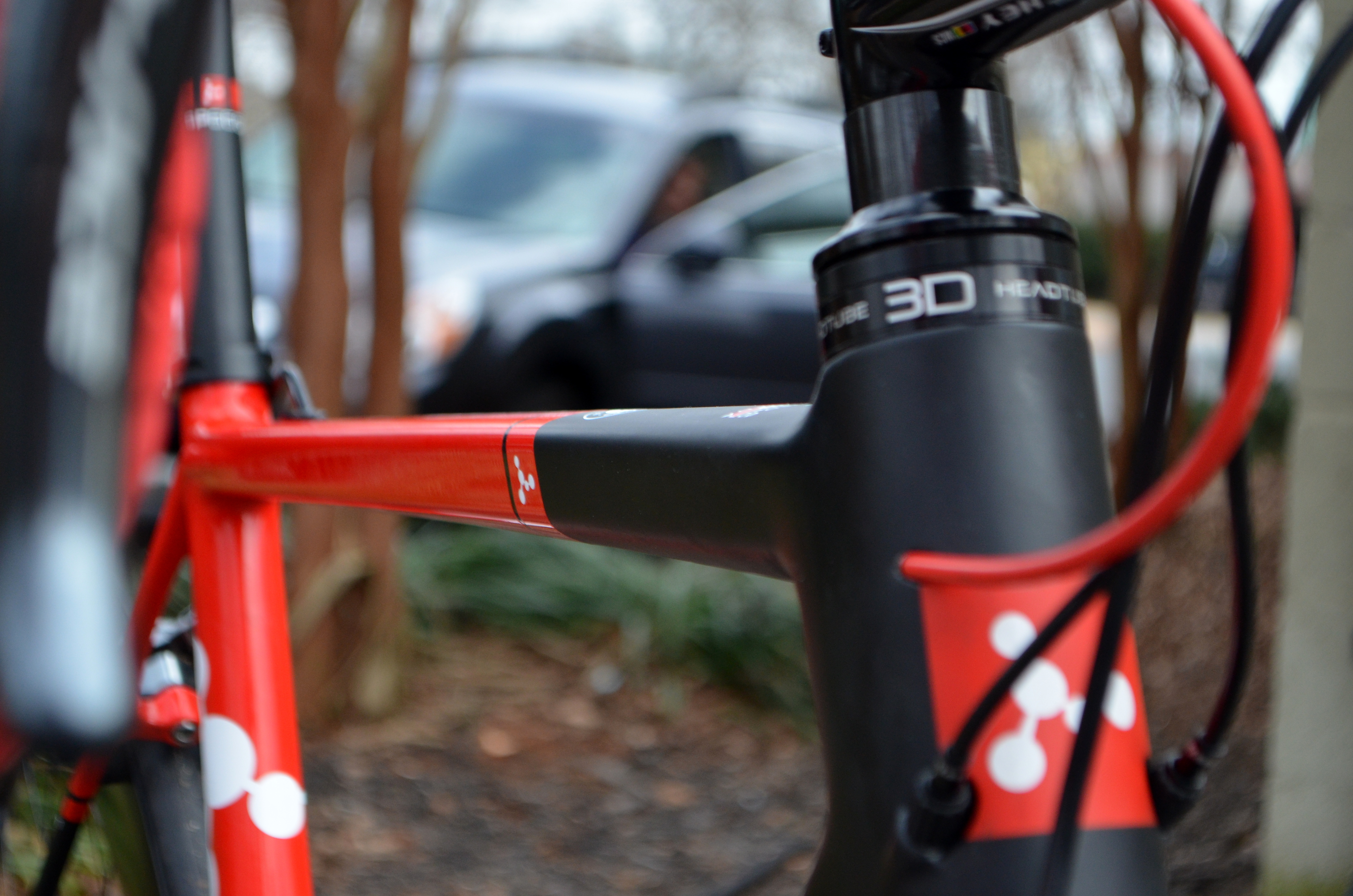
3D Headtube

ONEness Concept

The ONEness concept consists of an integrated aero and stemless fork/aerobar combination that is designed to be aerodynamic and ergonomic. The design extends to the frame, fork, headset, base bar and aero bars, brakes and levers as well as a reversible carbon seatpost which can be 76 or 78°.

3D Headtube

This consists of interchangeable structural spacers that extend the headtube's height.

Integrated Disc Brakes

Argon 18 introduced the world’s first integrated disc brakes on the E-119 Tri+ Disc, completely hiding the calipers as well as the hydraulic cables and reservoirs, for a clear aero advantage.

== Professional cycling teams ==
- Maloja Pushbikers (UCI Continental Team)
- Project Echelon Racing (UCI Continental Team)
- Global 6 Cycling (UCI Continental Team)
- Beltrami TSA Tre Colli (UCI Continental Team)
- Team Novo Nordisk (UCI Pro Team)
- Team NPV Carl Ras Roskilde Junior (Club Team)

== Professional triathletes ==
- Craig Alexander
- Heather Jackson
- Michelle Vesterby
- Eric Lagerstrom
- Stephanie Roy
