= BMC Switzerland =

Swiss bicycle company

BMC Switzerland AG

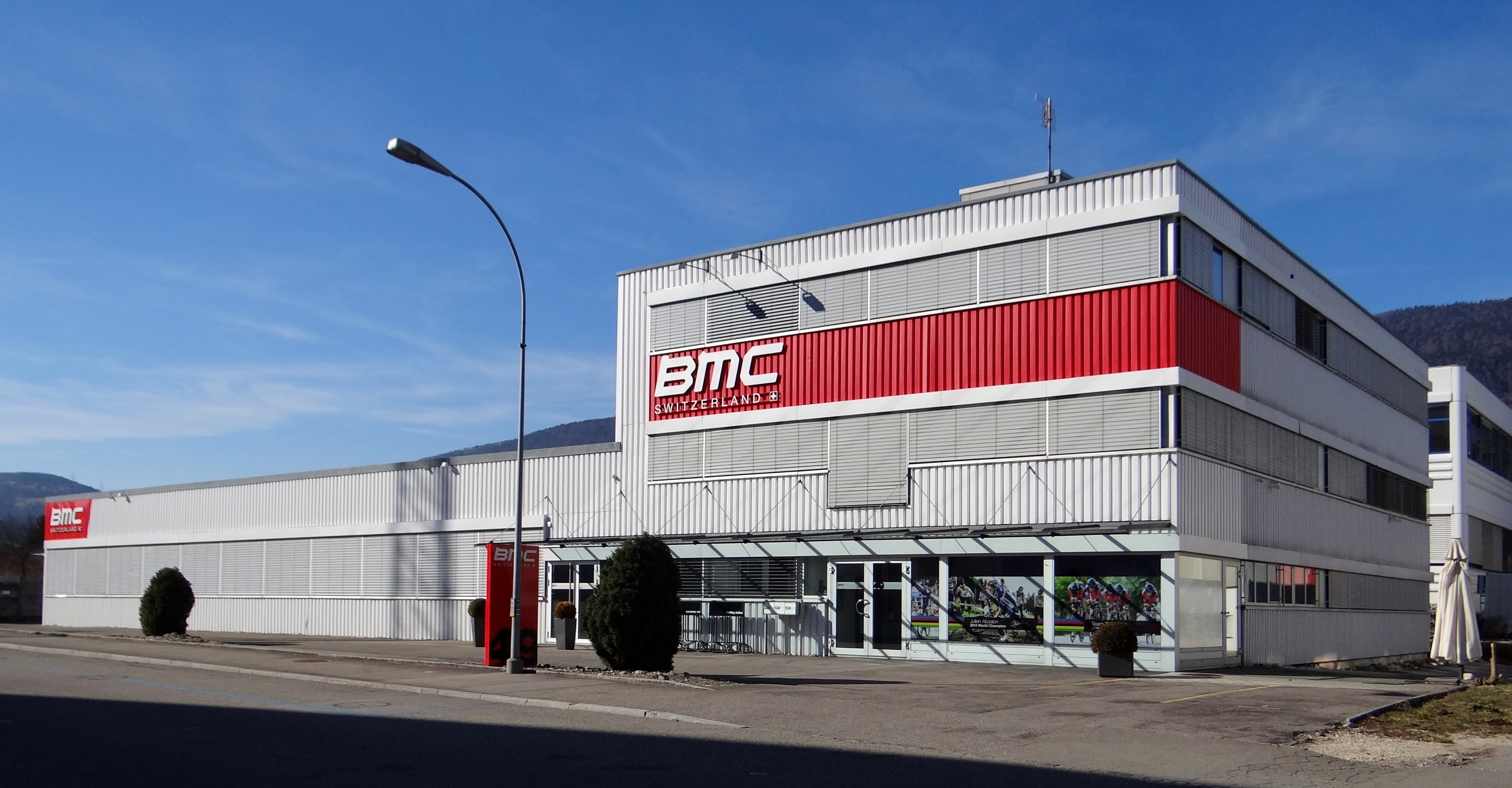
- BMC HQ
- Type: Aktiengesellschaft
- Industry: Bicycles
- Founded: 1986
- Headquarters: Grenchen, Solothurn, Switzerland
- Products: Bicycles, cycling accessories
- Website: www.bmc-switzerland.com

BMC Switzerland AG (abbreviation of "Bicycle Manufacturing Company") is a Swiss bicycle and cycling product manufacturer based in Grenchen. BMC designs, builds and distributes road bikes, mountain bikes, and commuter bikes primarily for sale to dealers in North America, Europe, South Africa, Australia, East Asia and the United Arab Emirates.

== History ==
=== 1986-2001 founding and early years ===
In 1986, American Bob Bigelow founded BMC as an assembler and wholesale distributor of Raleigh bicycles (then owned by Derby Cycle). After losing his distributor's license, Bigelow began building bikes under a new BMC label, but it remained a niche brand. In 2001, the company shifted their strategy, turning to greater investment in engineering and design.

=== 2001-present ===
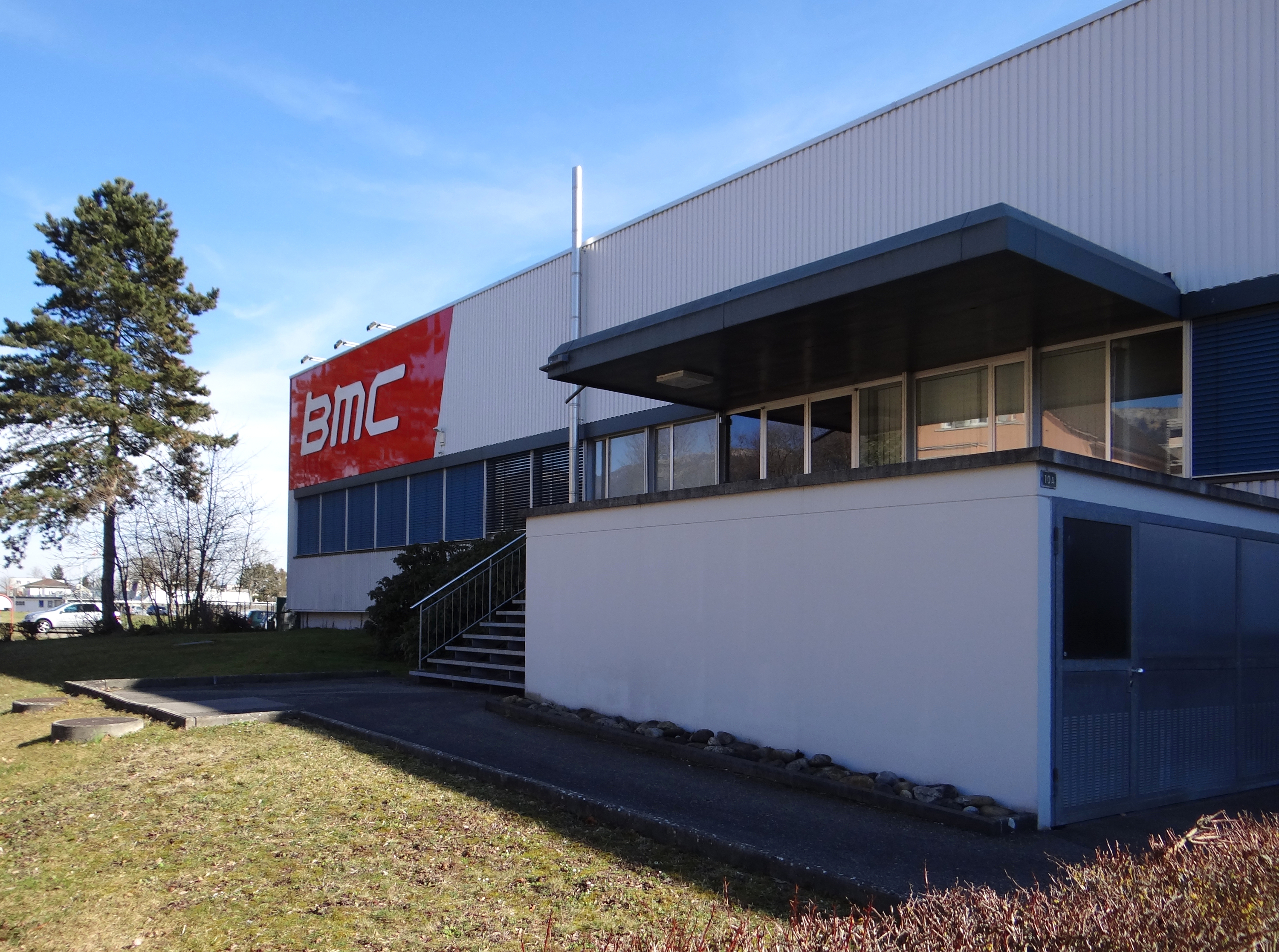
BMC impec lab

BMC's relationship to performance cycling began when BMC began supplying the Swiss professional road racing team Phonak with bikes. The team's patron was Andy Rihs, owner of the world-leading hearing-aid company of the same name. Andy Rihs took over BMC in 2000 with the vision of building a carbon production facility in Grenchen, Switzerland to produce the ‘Porsche of race bikes’ and the Impec road bike was created. Having a carbon production facility at its disposal has heavily influenced how BMC approaches bike manufacturing. The facility is now called the Impec Advanced R&D Lab, and it is primarily used for research and development by the company's design and engineering teams.

Professional cycling teams and athletes riding BMC's bikes have won the Tour de France, the Tour de Romandie, the Tirreno–Adriatico, the Tour de Wallonie, the Paris–Tours, Critérium International, Paris–Roubaix, and many other high-profile events. In 2014 and 2015 the BMC Racing Team won the UCI Team Time Trial World Championships. In 2015, Australian rider Rohan Dennis broke the hour record on a BMC.

== Sponsorship ==
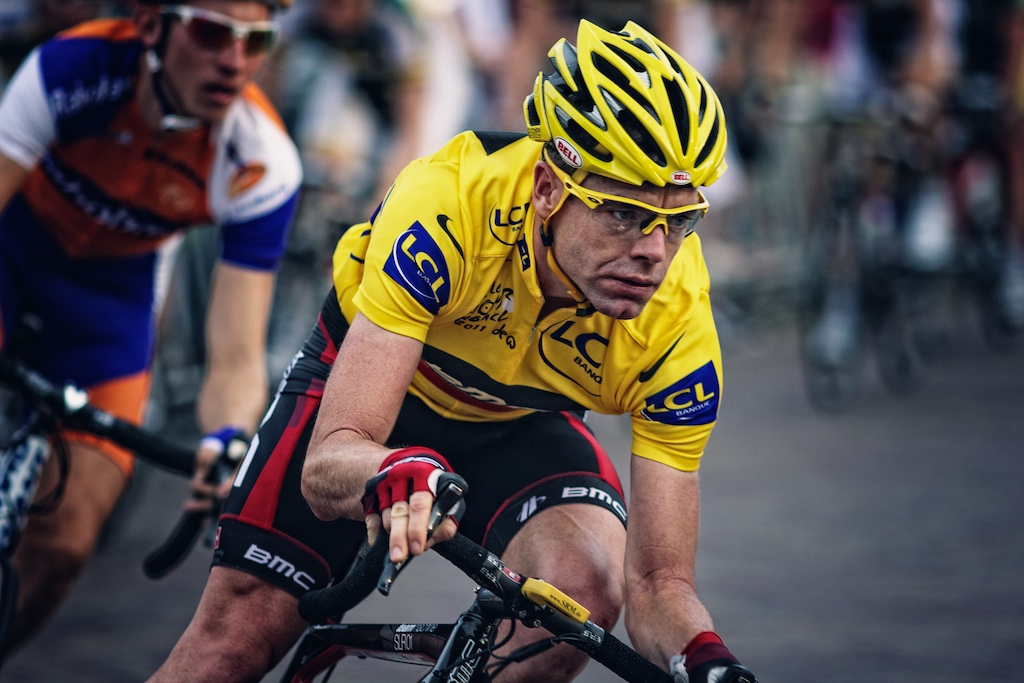
Cadel Evans of BMC Racing wearing the maillot jaune during the final stage of the 2011 Tour de France

At the end of the 2018 season, BMC withdrew support of the BMC Racing Team, whose former leader, Cadel Evans won the 2011 Tour de France, the BMC Mountain Bike Racing Team as well as the BMC Factory Trailcrew. From 2019, BMC is a bicycle supplier for Team Dimension Data. Beside that, BMC is also co-sponsoring the Uplace-BMC Pro Triathlon Team as well as many other athletes. As of 2023, BMC is a sponsor and supplier of the Tudor Pro Cycling Team which was founded and is run by Swiss professional road racing cyclist Fabian Cancellara.
