= Canyon Bicycles =

German bicycle manufacturer

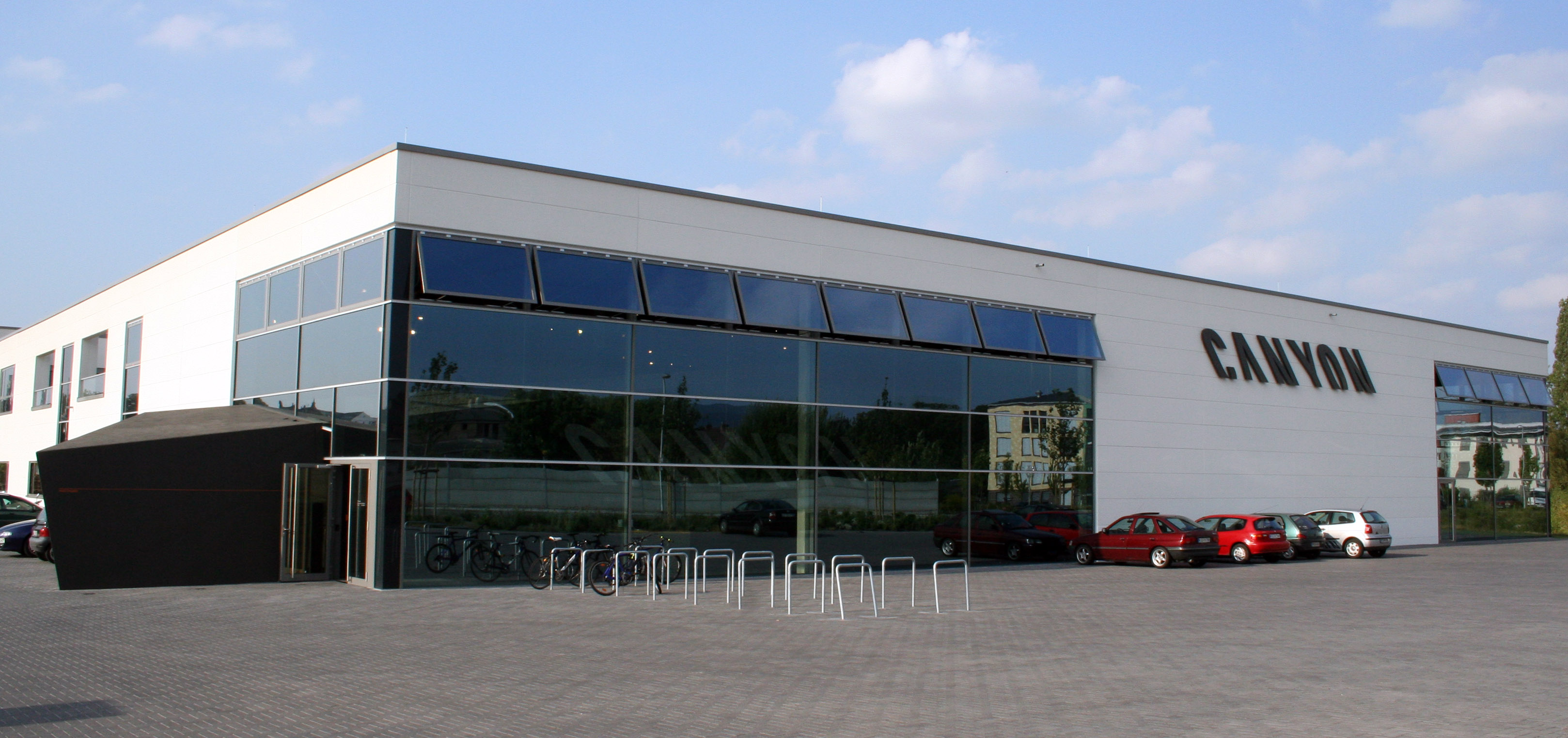
- Headquarters in Koblenz, Germany
- Type: GmbH
- Founded: 2002; 24 years ago
- Founder: Roman Arnold
- Headquarters: Koblenz, Germany
- Key people: Roman Arnold (Executive Chairman)
- Products: Sport cycles
- Revenue: €738 million (US$872.83 million) (2025)
- Number of employees: 800+ (October 2016)
- Website: canyon.com

Canyon Bicycles GmbH (abbr.: Canyon) is a German distributor and partly manufacturer of road bikes, gravel bikes, mountain bikes, hybrid bikes, triathlon bikes, and e-bikes based in Koblenz, Germany.

== History ==
In 1985, Roman Arnold and his brother Franc Arnold (who is no longer involved with the company) founded 'Radsport Arnold' GmbH as a retailer of bike parts for cycling. It was not until 1996 that the first bikes with the brand name Canyon appeared. Radsport Arnold adopted a direct sales strategy via the Internet.

In 2001, the company took the step from being a supplier to becoming a cycle manufacturer and changed its name to Canyon Bicycles GmbH. With Lutz Scheffer (formerly Bergwerk and Votec), Canyon was able to secure the services of a frame designer. In the next few years, the firm based in Koblenz, Germany was able to hire Hans Christian Smolik, along with other bicycle construction experts.

In 2006, Canyon unveiled its new corporate design, which also received several awards in 2007 (European Design Award for Corporate Design, red dot design awards for Corporate and web design, iF Product Design Award for Corporate Design).

In 2018, Canyon launched its first e-bike called the Spectral:ON.

In 2020, the brand launched the first in its line of Canyon Factory Racing (CFR) bikes (the Strive mountain bike), a limited run of high-end bikes designed for professional riders. The current CFR lineup consists of the Lux, Aeroad, Exceed, Sender, Endurace, and Ultimate.

== Production and assembling ==
Canyon's bicycle frames and forks are designed by Canyon and produced in Asia. Quest Composite Technology is an important supplier that also produces frames for Trek. Canyon conducts assembly, quality inspections, and tests in Koblenz.

== Involvement in cycle and triathlon sport ==
Radsport Arnold was involved in elite sport right from its start. In 1985 the Koblenz-based company had its first successful sportsman under contract in Jürgen Zäck.

In the area of road racing, the company has been in cooperation with various teams. In 2007, the company first equipped the team Unibet.com, which took part in the UCI ProTour. The brand has previously sponsored several professional road racing teams, including Katusha. Currently, the Movistar men's and women's teams, Alpecin–Deceuninck and Canyon–SRAM compete on Canyon racing bikes.

Nairo Quintana won on a Canyon bike the 2014 Giro d'Italia, riding an Ultimate CF SLX frame for the road stages and a Speedmax CF for the time trials. Then again, in 2019, Canyon was at the top of the podium in the Italian Giro with Richard Carapaz reaching the Arena di Verona after a successful last time trial. Other achievements on Canyon bikes include Cadel Evans' 2009 World Professional Road Race Championship for the Silence-Lotto team, Alexander Kristoff's two stage wins in the 2014 Tour de France, Alex Dowsett's Hour Record and Jan Frodeno´s wins at the Ironman European Championship 2015 in Frankfurt and at the Ironman World Championship in Hawaii 2015. From 2017–2020, Canyon ran a very successful collaboration with Pauline Ferrand-Prévot, who led the athlete to win two French XCO National Championships, racked up multiple XCO World Cup podium finishes, took XCO World Championship bronze, and became national cyclocross champion. After a surgery, she was back on the podium in XCO World Cup win in Val di Sole, gold at the XCO World Championships in Mont-Sainte-Anne, and another win at the XCM World Championships in Grächen. Then, in 2020, before parting company with Canyon, she won the XCO World Cup race in Nové Město, became XCO World Champion once again, and went on to win European Championship gold.

In December 2016, it was announced that they would co-sponsor the British UCI Continental-status Bike Channel–Canyon team, which would make its debut in 2017.

In 2020, Mathieu van der Poel won the Tour of Flanders on a Canyon Aeroad, adding this to his palmares in the main XCO competitions and lately road ones, including a win in 2021 Strade Bianche.

== Other branding ==
Until August 2019, Canyon bikes were called "Pure Cycling" in Switzerland since the brand name "Canyon" was trademarked by Lizard Sport AG. Canyon bikes made for the Swiss market sported the model name instead of the brand name on their downtube.

== Controversies ==
After standardizing company-wide IT infrastructure to suit projections that began in November 2015, Canyon expanded production facilities to end the year. During the subsequent transitional phases of improvement, Canyon's reputation suffered from cutbacks in customer service. Associated obstacles were encountered during internal expansions that were coupled to external supply chain deficiencies regarding spare parts. Reported discontent essentially reflected concerns that the company grew more interested in selling its products than providing adequate customer service.

To address concerns, Canyon's founder and CEO released a statement in February 2016, offering an official apology and addressing customer criticism. The disclosure also informed the public of the contributing circumstances and outlined corrective actions. The firm thanked customers for their loyalty and continued patience.
