= Scott Sports =

Swiss manufacturer of sporting goods

- Industry: Bicycles, skiing, snowboarding and motocross equipment
- Founded: 1958; 68 years ago (as Scott USA)
- Founder: Ed Scott
- Headquarters: Givisiez, Canton of Fribourg, Switzerland
- Products: Helmets, Goggles, Bicycles, Skis, Apparel, Footwear
- Website: scott-sports.com

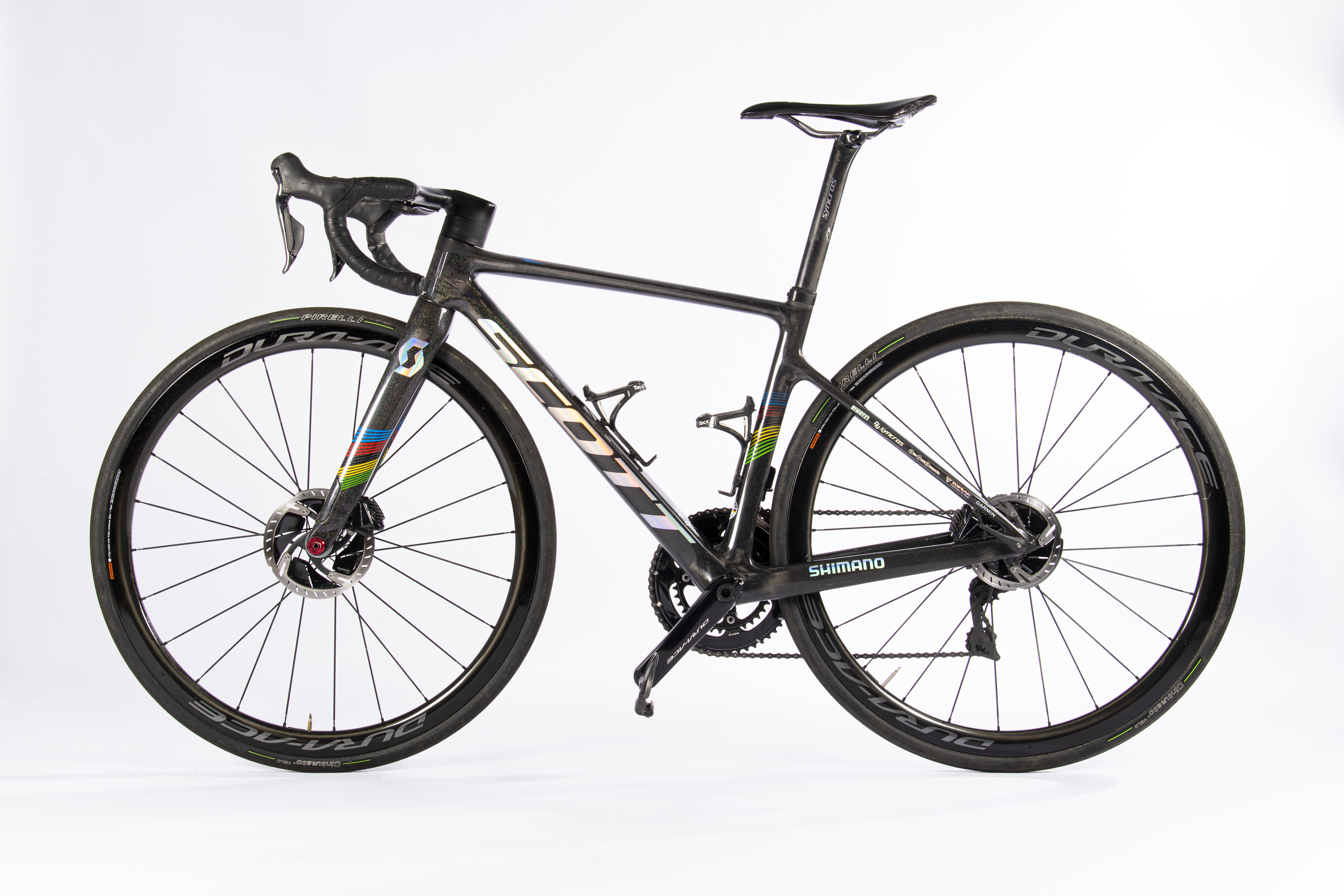
Scott racing bike designed for Annemiek Van Vleuten in 2020 (collection KOERS. Museum of Cycle Racing)

Scott Sports (formerly Scott USA) is a producer of bicycles, winter equipment, motorsports gear, running shoes and sportswear. The company's main office is in Givisiez, Switzerland, with branches in Europe, the United States, South Africa and India.

== History ==
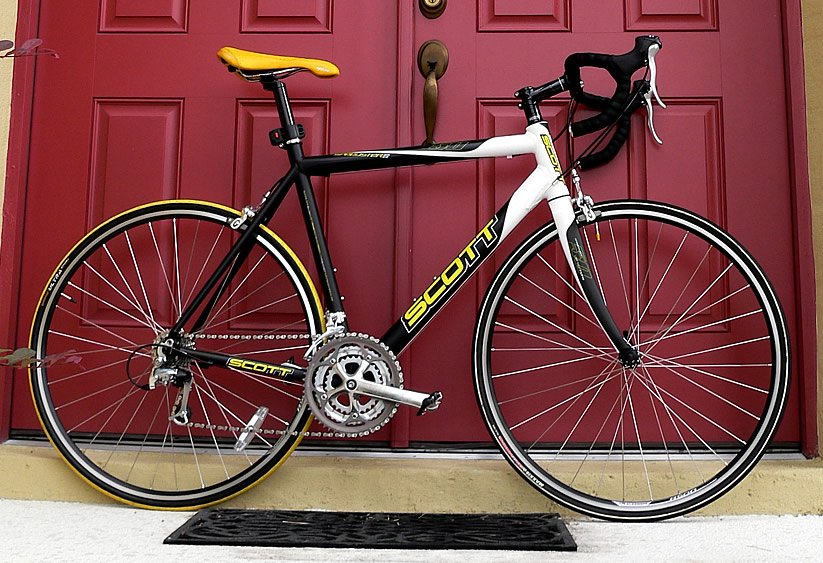
An old Scott racing bike

In 1958, engineer and skier Ed Scott from Sun Valley, Idaho, invented a ski pole made of aluminium instead of bamboo or steel that proved popular. The company produced sporting goods in many fields. In 1970, Scott sold their first protection goggles for motocross riders.

Scott expanded to Europe in 1978, settling their headquarters in Fribourg, Switzerland.

In 1990, Scott introduced the clip-on, aerodynamic bicycle handlebar. The handlebar was used by American Greg LeMond in his 1989 Tour de France win, when he beat Frenchman Laurent Fignon by over a minute in the 24.5 km final time trial. Previous to this event it was widely used in triathlon and Race Across America.

In 1991, Scott produced their first suspension fork named "Unishock" and a year later, their first full-suspension mountain bicycle was shown to the public.

Its 2001 Team Issue road bike frame was the lightest frame available at the time at 895 grams.

In 2005 the name 'Scott USA' was changed to 'Scott Sports', representing a shift in emphasis to the European market.

In 2011, Scott launched its E-Bike line E-Sub and E-Sportster, replaced in 2012 with E-Venture line models.

in 2012, Scott bought Syncros, a maker of bicycle components.

In 2015, the Korean Youngone Corporation took a 50.1% stake in the company, with the previous Swiss owner Beat Zaugg retaining 49.9%.

== Sponsorship ==
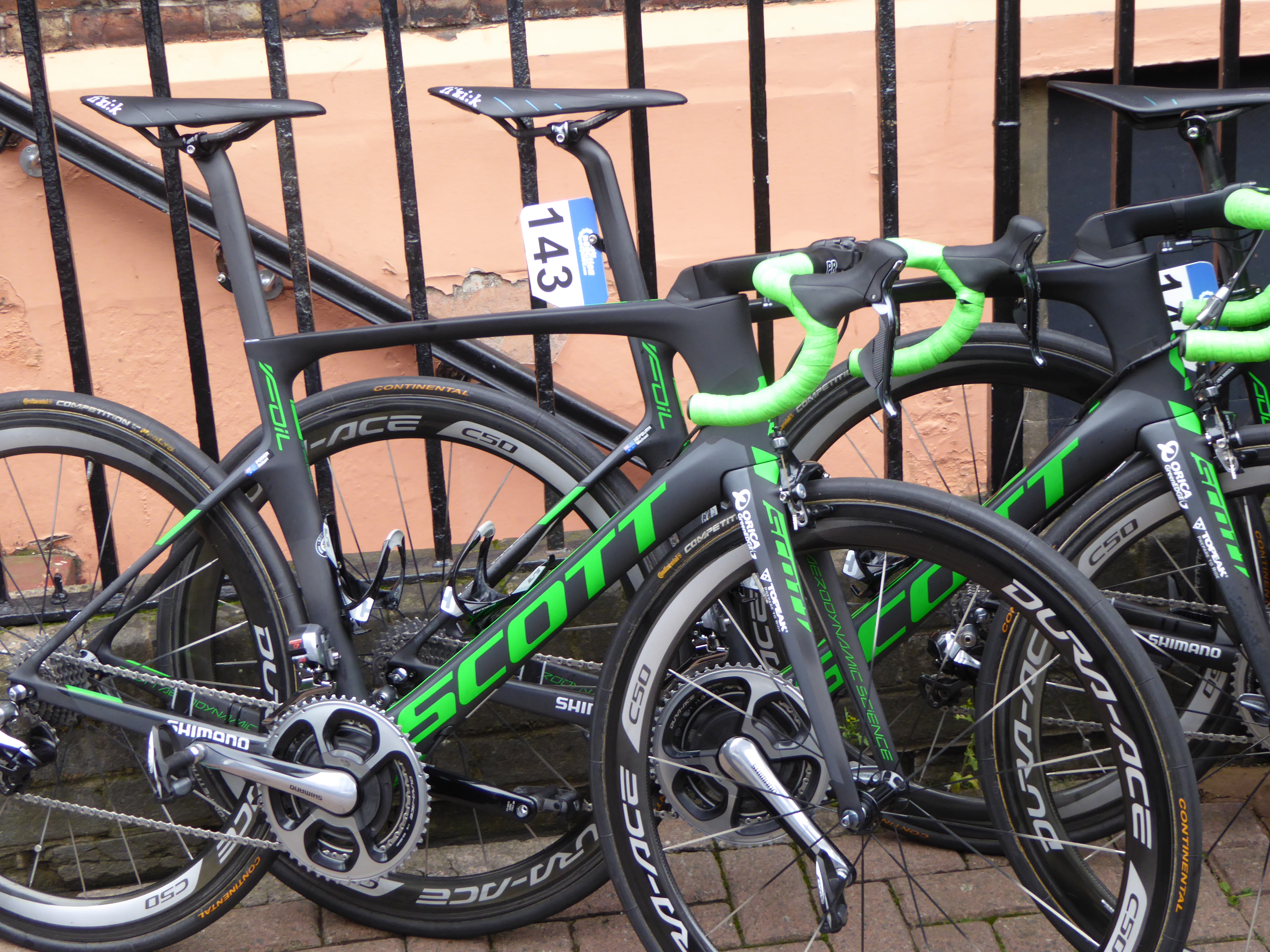
Scott bicycles, used by the Orica–BikeExchange cycling team, at the 2016 Tour of Britain

In 2002, stage 10 of the Tour de France was won by Patrice Halgand riding for the Jean Delatour team, which was at that time supported by Scott. Scott supplied the teams Mitchelton-Scott (male) and Mitchelton Scott (female) with equipment through 2020, after which the teams were renamed Team BikeExchange and began riding Bianchi bicycles.

In 2014, Scott Sports partnered with the US Military Endurance Sports organization to be a sponsor and provide Scott equipment to the US Domestic Elite Road Team and Elite Triathlon Team.

In 2017, Scott Sports was sponsoring teams and individuals in various sports. Its bike division was sponsoring 12 racing and mountain biking teams. Its wintersport division sponsored 35 people, its running division 10 and motorsports division 40 athletes.

In 2022, Jonas Deichmann cycled across United States of America, from New York to Los Angeles on a Scott Addict Gravel HMX. The trip was a world record attempt and a fundraiser for World Bicycle Relief.
