= Corima =

French company

Corima is a French company that designs and produces carbon-composite wheels and frames for road and track cycling, cyclo-cross racing, triathlon racing, and wheelchair racing.

== History ==
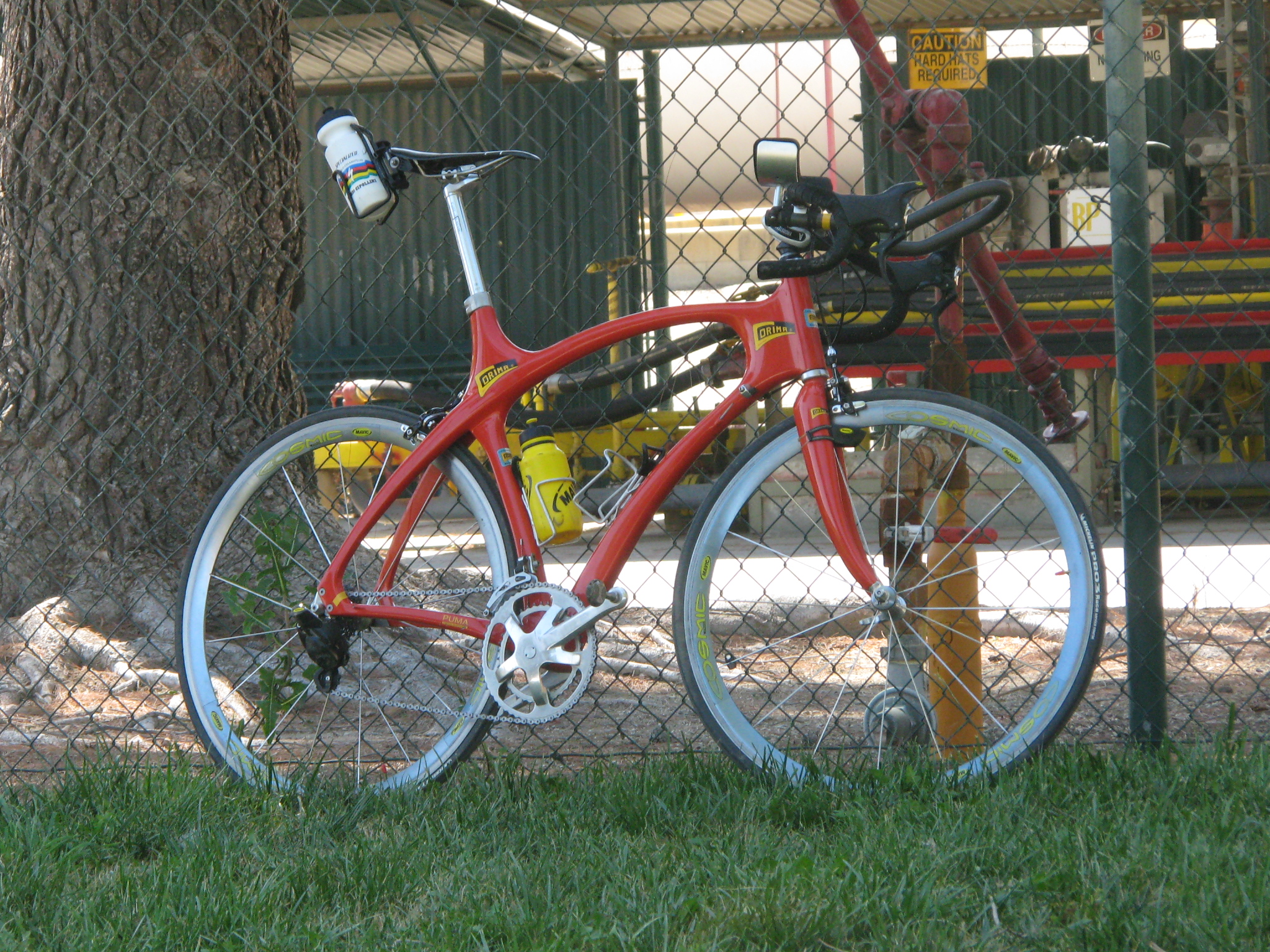
A Corima Puma road bike

Corima was founded in 1973 by Pierre Martin and Jean-Marie Riffard in Loriol-sur-Drôme. Corima is taken from COoperation RIffard MArtin. Its initial activities were making moulds and models for the foundry, automobile and aeronautics sectors.

In 1988, Corima diversified into carbon composite parts and its first product for cycling : the disc wheel. This was followed by the 4-spoke wheel, the Puma monocoque frame, the Aero wheel, the Ellipse seatpost and others to create a range of carbon products. In 1994, Corima expanded to frames, achieving success with the Puma, an aerodynamic carbon monocoque road frame with a steeply sloping top tube, based on the custom track frame ridden by Chris Boardman in 1993. However, production was discontinued in 1999, due to revised UCI rules that rendered the Puma's geometry inconsistent with racing frame guidelines. This banning from competition meant limited exposure and sponsorships. Corima continued making a track frame with similar geometry and sloping top tube - the Cougar - until it was replaced by the VIF frame.

The Fox was another carbon frame, primarily for triathlon, time trial and track racing. It too incorporated aerodynamic geometry, though different from the Puma and the Cougar.

Two world hour records have been broken on Corima bikes: Chris Boardman in July 1993 and Catherine Marsal in April 1995.
