= Mavic (bicycle parts company) =

French bicycle parts manufacturer

- Industry: Cycling components
- Founded: c.1889
- Headquarters: Annecy, France
- Products: Bicycle and Related Components
- Owner: Bourrelier Group
- Website: www.mavic.com

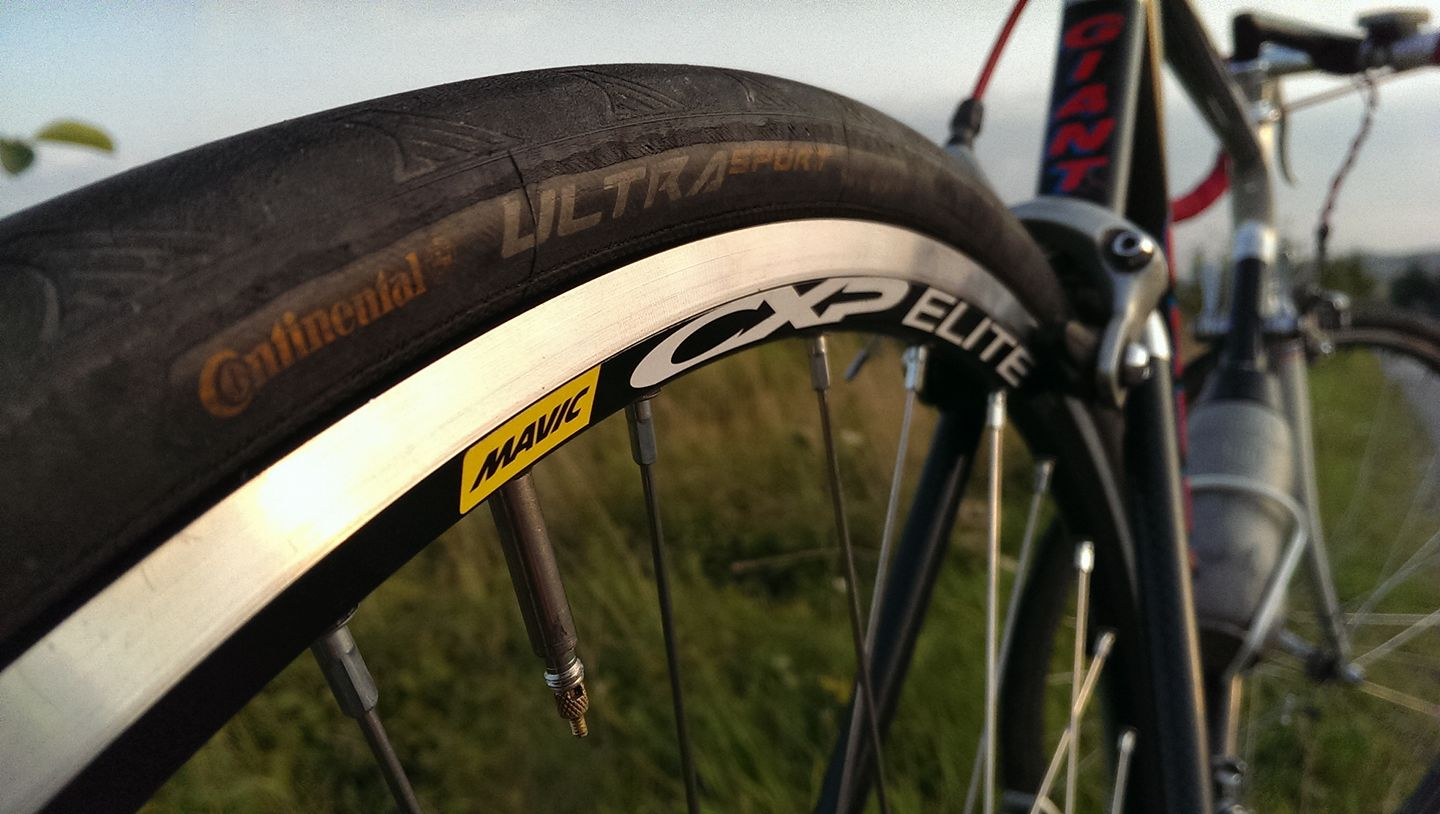
Mavic CXP Elite road bicycle rim clad with Continental tyre

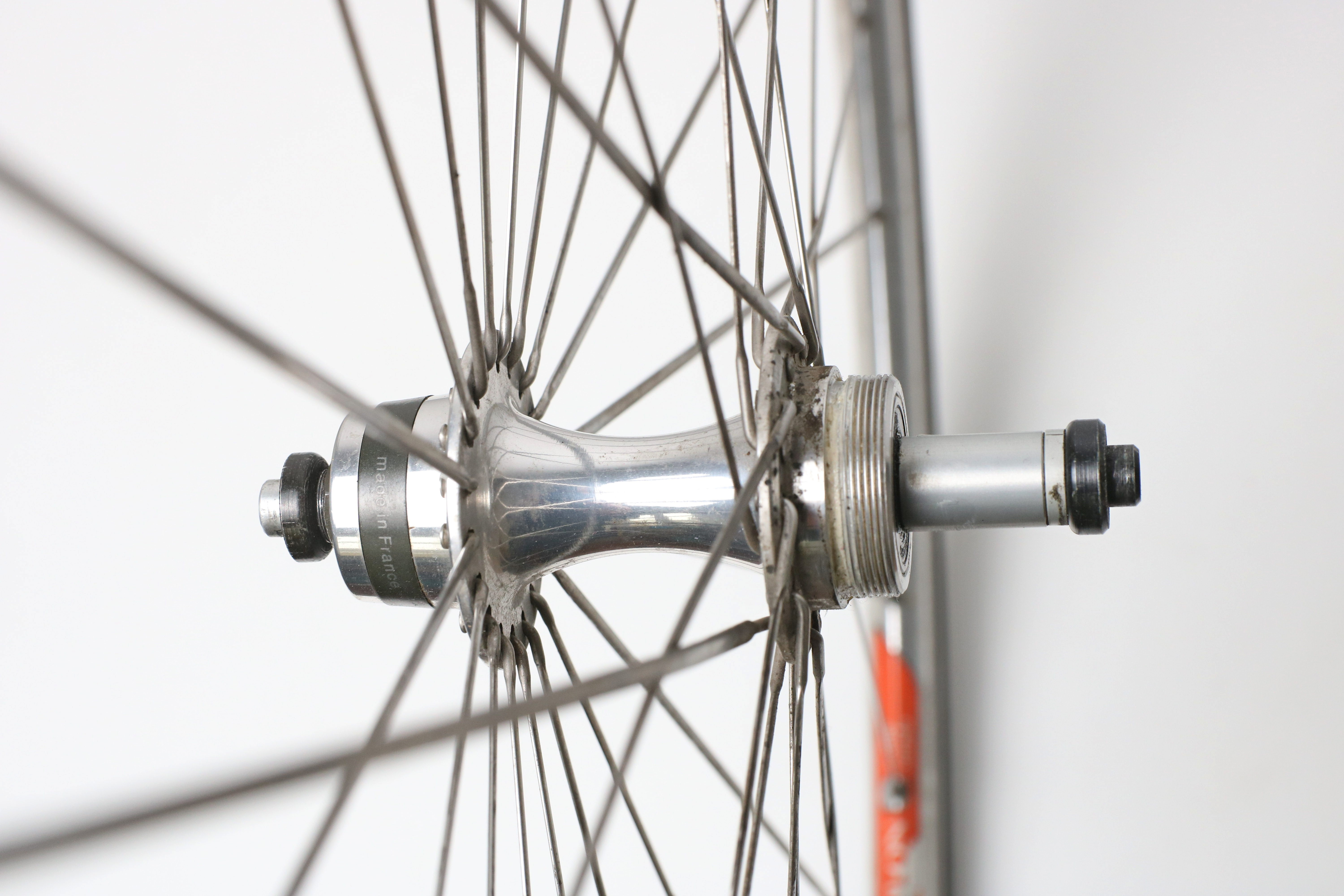
Mavic Strada wheel (1980s)

Mavic is a France-based bicycle parts manufacturer, its name is an acronym for Manufacture d'Articles Vélocipédiques Idoux et Chanel.

It was founded by Charles Idoux and Lucien Chanel in Lyon, France in the late 1800s. Mavic produced the first aluminium rim in 1934, and the first disc wheel in 1973. Also in 1973, Mavic introduced "neutral" support for all racing teams during cycle races.

Mavic has developed many products over the years, including a Tour de France winning groupset, but is today focused on wheels.

In the 80s Mavic was sold to French ski parts company Salomon and certain R&D functions placed in their facility in Annecy, while the Saint-Trivier was kept for series production of aluminium rims and other parts. Salomon was acquired by Adidas in the 90s, and then sold off to Amer Sports, a Finnish sports clothing conglomerate which had redefined itself from former glories as a tobacco manufacturer. After years of growth to over €120m and venturing into clothing apparel, by 2019 Mavic had met hard times with sales dropping to €60m under heavy losses and pension commitments under French law. The parent decided to not support the company further and Mavic was close to bankruptcy. Mavic was first then sold to a private equity firm Regent LP for a nominal sum,, and after ownership turmoil and a bidding process with some 15 bidders including international bicycle parts brands such as SRAM, and several local French manufacturers and other international bidders, the company was sold to the French family company Bourrelier Group in 2020. for 1.1 million euro + an investment commitment.
