= Ridley Bikes =

Bicycle manufacturer

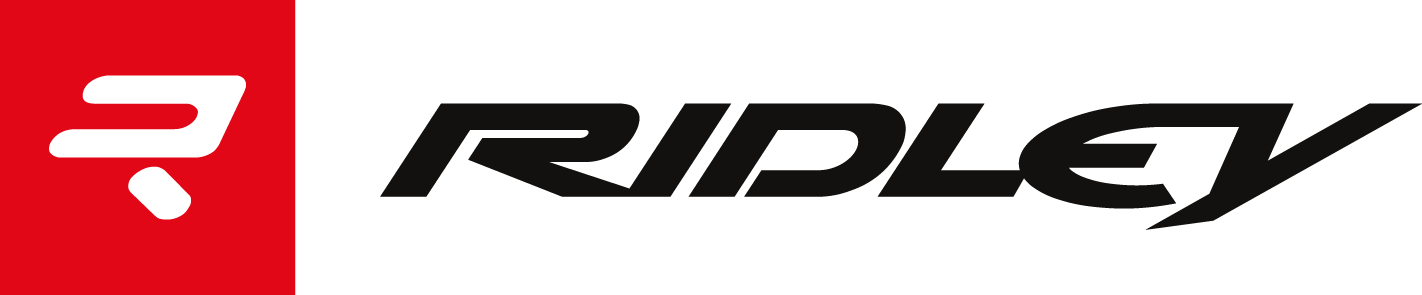
- Type: Private
- Industry: Bicycles
- Founded: 1997
- Headquarters: Belgium
- Key people: Jochim Aerts
- Products: Bicycle and related components
- Website: http://www.ridley-bikes.com

Ridley Bikes was started in 1997 by Jochim Aerts, a frame builder and painter who had been producing frames for Belgian bicycle companies since 1990. In a few years, Ridley became the market leader in Belgium for racing bikes. They are the main bike sponsors for team Uno-X.

Ridley boasts of having developed the fastest time trial machines in the world with the types Dean and Noah, which were created after intensive wind tunnel tests. These tests led to findings for a new wheel series, the future aero speed technology - FAST for the road. Before 2001, Race Productions NV started developing and selling wheel components such as saddles, handlebars, wheels, etc. under the brand name 4ZA-FORZA.

Ridley bikes are currently owned by a Belgium company, Race Productions, who also bought out Eddy Merckx when the company was struggling in 2017.

Ridley Bikes is named in honour of film director Ridley Scott.
