= 2018 Team LottoNL–Jumbo season =

Team LottoNL–Jumbo
- 2018 season
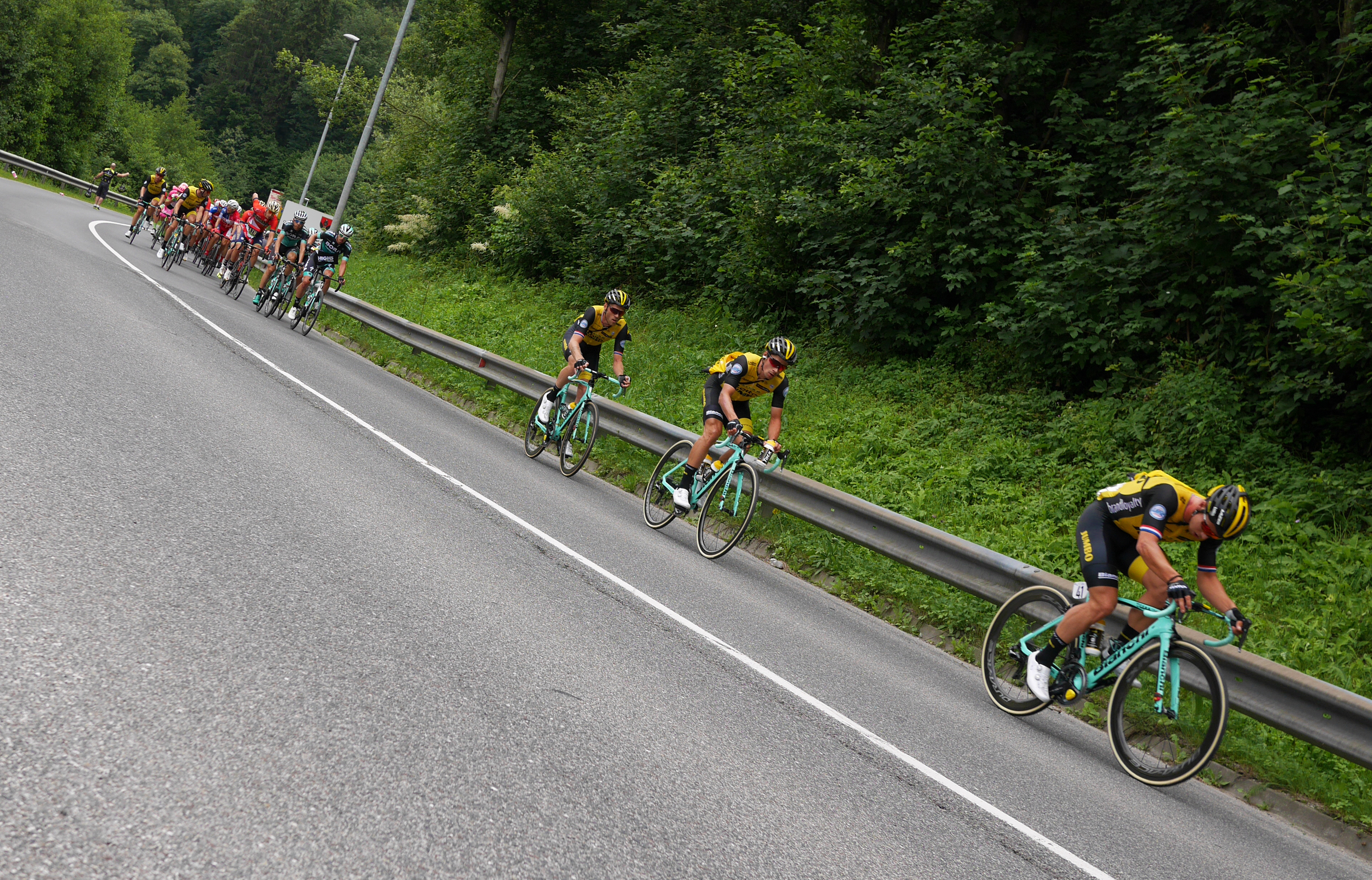
- Team LottoNL-Jumbo leading the Peloton on 3rd stage of Tour of Slovenia 2018
- Status: UCI WorldTeam
- Manager: Richard Plugge
- Main sponsor(s): Jumbo & Staatsloterij
- Based: Netherlands
- Bicycles: Bianchi
- Groupset: Shimano

Season victories
- One-day races: 5
- Stage race overall: 4
- Stage race stages: 24
- Most wins: Dylan Groenewegen
- Best ranked rider: Primož Roglič (12th)
- Jersey

The 2018 season for the LottoNL–Jumbo road cycling team which began in January at the Tour Down Under. As a UCI WorldTeam, they were automatically invited and obligated to send a squad to every event in the UCI World Tour.

== Team roster ==
As of 7 February 2018.

Rider	Date of birth
Enrico Battaglin (ITA)	17 November 1989 (aged 27)
George Bennett (NZL)	7 April 1990 (aged 26)
Lars Boom (NED)	30 December 1985 (aged 31)
Koen Bouwman (NED)	2 December 1993 (aged 23)
Stef Clement (NED)	24 September 1982 (aged 34)
Floris De Tier (BEL)	20 January 1992 (aged 24)
Pascal Eenkhoorn (NED)	8 February 1997 (aged 19)
Robert Gesink (NED)	31 May 1986 (aged 30)
Dylan Groenewegen (NED)	21 June 1993 (aged 23)
Amund Grøndahl Jansen (NOR)	11 February 1994 (aged 22)
Steven Kruijswijk (NED)	7 June 1987 (aged 29)
Sepp Kuss (USA)	13 September 1994 (aged 22)
Tom Leezer (NED)	26 December 1985 (aged 31)

Rider	Date of birth
Bert-Jan Lindeman (NED)	16 June 1989 (aged 27)
Paul Martens (GER)	26 October 1983 (aged 33)
Daan Olivier (NED)	24 November 1992 (aged 24)
Neilson Powless (USA)	3 September 1996 (aged 20)
Primož Roglič (SLO)	29 October 1989 (aged 27)
Timo Roosen (NED)	11 January 1993 (aged 23)
Bram Tankink (NED)	3 December 1978 (aged 38)
Antwan Tolhoek (NED)	29 April 1994 (aged 22)
Jos van Emden (NED)	27 June 1985 (aged 31)
Gijs Van Hoecke (BEL)	12 November 1991 (aged 25)
Danny Van Poppel (NED)	26 July 1993 (aged 23)
Robert Wagner (GER)	17 April 1983 (aged 33)
Maarten Wynants (BEL)	13 May 1982 (aged 34)

Riders who joined the team for the 2018 season

Rider	2017 team
Pascal Eenkhoorn	BMC Development Team
Sepp Kuss	Rally Cycling
Neilson Powless	Axeon–Hagens Berman
Danny Van Poppel	Team Sky

Riders who left the team during or after the 2017 season

Rider	2018 team
Victor Campenaerts	Lotto–Soudal
Twan Castelijns	Retired
Martijn Keizer	----
Steven Lammertink	Vital Concept
Juan José Lobato	Fired
Jurgen van den Broeck	Retired
Alexey Vermeulen	Interpro Cycling Academy

== Season victories ==
Date	Race	Competition	Rider	Country	Location
4 February	Volta a la Comunitat Valenciana, Stage 1	UCI Europe Tour	Danny van Poppel (NED)	Spain	Peniscola
6 February	Dubai Tour, Stage 1	UCI Asia Tour	Dylan Groenewegen (NED)	United Arab Emirates	Palm Jumeirah
14 February	Volta ao Algarve, Stage 1	UCI Europe Tour	Dylan Groenewegen (NED)	Portugal	Lagos
17 February	Volta ao Algarve, Stage 4	UCI Europe Tour	Dylan Groenewegen (NED)	Portugal	Tavira
25 February	Kuurne–Brussels–Kuurne	UCI Europe Tour	Dylan Groenewegen (NED)	Belgium	Kuurne
5 March	Paris–Nice, Stage 2	UCI World Tour	Dylan Groenewegen (NED)	France	Vierzon
9 March	Tirreno–Adriatico, Stage 3	UCI World Tour	Primož Roglič (SLO)	Italy	Trevi
22 March	Settimana Internazionale di Coppi e Bartali, Stage 1a	UCI Europe Tour	Pascal Eenkhoorn (NED)	Italy	Gatteo
5 April	Tour of the Basque Country, Stage 4 (ITT)	UCI World Tour	Primož Roglič (SLO)	Spain	Lodosa
7 April	Tour of the Basque Country, Overall	UCI World Tour	Primož Roglič (SLO)	Spain	
7 April	Tour of the Basque Country, Points classification	UCI World Tour	Primož Roglič (SLO)	Spain	
29 April	Tour de Romandie, Overall	UCI World Tour	Primož Roglič (SLO)	Switzerland	
9 May	Giro d'Italia, Stage 5	UCI World Tour	Enrico Battaglin (ITA)	Italy	Santa Ninfa
16 May	Tour of Norway, Stage 1	UCI Europe Tour	Dylan Groenewegen (NED)	Norway	Horten
18 May	Tour of Norway, Stage 3	UCI Europe Tour	Dylan Groenewegen (NED)	Norway	Sarpsborg
19 May	Tour of Norway, Stage 4	UCI Europe Tour	Dylan Groenewegen (NED)	Norway	Brumunddal
14 June	Tour of Slovenia, Stage 2	UCI Europe Tour	Dylan Groenewegen (NED)	Slovenia	Rogaska Slatina
16 June	Tour of Slovenia, Stage 4	UCI Europe Tour	Primož Roglič (SLO)	Slovenia	Kamnik
17 June	Tour of Slovenia, Stage 5 (ITT)	UCI Europe Tour	Primož Roglič (SLO)	Slovenia	Novo Mesto
17 June	Tour of Slovenia, Overall	UCI Europe Tour	Primož Roglič (SLO)	Slovenia	
19 June	Halle–Ingooigem	UCI Europe Tour	Danny van Poppel (NED)	Belgium	Ingooigem
13 July	Tour de France, Stage 7	UCI World Tour	Dylan Groenewegen (NED)	France	Chartres
14 July	Tour de France, Stage 8	UCI World Tour	Dylan Groenewegen (NED)	France	Amiens
28 July	Tour de France, Stage 19	UCI World Tour	Primož Roglič (SLO)	France	Laruns
8 August	Tour of Utah, Stage 2	UCI America Tour	Sepp Kuss (USA)	United States	Payson City
11 August	Tour of Utah, Stage 5	UCI America Tour	Sepp Kuss (USA)	United States	Snowbird Ski and Summer
12 August	Tour of Utah, Stage 6	UCI America Tour	Sepp Kuss (USA)	United States	Park City
12 August	Tour of Utah, Overall	UCI America Tour	Sepp Kuss (USA)	United States	
12 August	Tour of Utah, Mountains classification	UCI America Tour	Sepp Kuss (USA)	United States	
18 August	Colorado Classic, Stage 3	UCI America Tour	Pascal Eenkhoorn (NED)	United States	Denver
22 August	Arnhem–Veenendaal Classic	UCI Europe Tour	Dylan Groenewegen (NED)	Netherlands	Veenendaal
6 September	Tour of Britain, Stage 5 (TTT)	UCI Europe Tour	(Note: The riders on the squad were Primož Roglič, Koen Bouwman, Pascal Eenkhoorn, Jos van Emden, Neilson Powless and Maarten Wynants)	United Kingdom	Whinlatter
9 September	Tour of Britain, Teams classification	UCI Europe Tour	(Note: The riders on the squad were Primož Roglič, Koen Bouwman, Pascal Eenkhoorn, Jos van Emden, Neilson Powless and Maarten Wynants)	United Kingdom	
14 September	Kampioenschap van Vlaanderen	UCI Europe Tour	Dylan Groenewegen (NED)	Belgium	Koolskamp (West Flanders)
2 October	Binche–Chimay–Binche	UCI Europe Tour	Danny van Poppel (NED)	Belgium	Binche
16 October	Tour of Guangxi, stage 1	UCI World Tour	Dylan Groenewegen (NED)	China	Beihai

== National, Continental and World champions 2018 ==
Date	Discipline	Jersey	Rider	Country	Location
