= 2018 Quick-Step Floors season =

Quick-Step Floors
- 2018 season
- UCI code: QST
- Status: UCI ProTeam
- Manager: Patrick Lefevere
- Main sponsor(s): Quick-Step
- Based: Belgium
- Bicycles: Specialized
- Groupset: Shimano

Season victories
- One-day races: 14
- Stage race overall: 3
- Stage race stages: 45
- World Championships: 1
- National Championships: 5

The 2018 season for Quick-Step Floors began in January at the Tour Down Under. As a UCI WorldTeam, they were automatically invited and obliged to send a squad to every event in the UCI World Tour.

== 2018 roster ==
Rider	Date of birth
Julian Alaphilippe (FRA)	11 June 1992 (age 32)
Kasper Asgreen (Note: Asgreen joined the team on 27 March.) (DEN)	8 February 1995 (age 30)
Eros Capecchi (ITA)	13 June 1986 (age 38)
Rémi Cavagna (FRA)	10 August 1995 (age 29)
Laurens De Plus (BEL)	4 September 1995 (age 29)
Tim Declercq (BEL)	21 March 1989 (age 35)
Dries Devenyns (BEL)	22 July 1983 (age 41)
Fernando Gaviria (COL)	19 August 1994 (age 30)
Philippe Gilbert (BEL)	5 July 1982 (age 42)
Álvaro José Hodeg (COL)	16 September 1996 (age 28)
Fabio Jakobsen (NED)	31 August 1996 (age 28)
Bob Jungels (LUX)	22 September 1992 (age 32)
Iljo Keisse (BEL)	21 December 1982 (age 42)
James Knox (GBR)	4 November 1995 (age 29)

Rider	Date of birth
Yves Lampaert (BEL)	10 April 1991 (age 33)
Davide Martinelli (ITA)	31 May 1993 (age 31)
Enric Mas (ESP)	7 January 1995 (age 30)
Michael Mørkøv (DEN)	30 April 1985 (age 39)
Jhonatan Narváez (ECU)	4 March 1997 (age 28)
Maximiliano Richeze (ARG)	7 March 1983 (age 42)
Fabio Sabatini (ITA)	18 February 1985 (age 40)
Maximilian Schachmann (GER)	9 January 1994 (age 31)
Florian Sénéchal (FRA)	10 July 1993 (age 31)
Pieter Serry (BEL)	21 November 1988 (age 36)
Zdeněk Štybar (CZE)	11 December 1985 (age 39)
Niki Terpstra (NED)	18 May 1984 (age 40)
Petr Vakoč (CZE)	11 July 1992 (age 32)
Elia Viviani (ITA)	7 February 1989 (age 36)

Riders who joined the team for the 2018 season

Rider	2017 team
Kasper Asgreen (DEN)	Team Virtu Cycling
Álvaro José Hodeg (COL)	stagiare (Quick-Step Floors)
Fabio Jakobsen (NED)	SEG Racing Academy
James Knox (GBR)	WIGGINS
Michael Mørkøv (DEN)	Team Katusha–Alpecin
Jhonatan Narváez (ECU)	Axeon–Hagens Berman
Florian Sénéchal (FRA)	Cofidis
Elia Viviani (ITA)	Team Sky

Riders who left the team during or after the 2017 season

Rider	2018 team
Jack Bauer (NZL)	Mitchelton–BikeExchange
Tom Boonen (BEL)	Retired
Gianluca Brambilla (ITA)	Trek–Segafredo
David de la Cruz (ESP)	Team Sky
Marcel Kittel (GER)	Team Katusha–Alpecin
Dan Martin (IRL)	UAE Team Emirates
Matteo Trentin (ITA)	Mitchelton–BikeExchange
Martin Velits (SVK)	Retired
Julien Vermote (BEL)	Team Dimension Data

== Season victories ==
As of 13 October

Date	Race	Competition	Rider	Country	Location
18 January	Tour Down Under, Stage 3	UCI World Tour	Elia Viviani (ITA)	Australia	Victor Harbor
21 January	Vuelta a San Juan, Stage 1	UCI America Tour	Fernando Gaviria (COL)	Argentina	Pocito
24 January	Vuelta a San Juan, Stage 4	UCI America Tour	Maximiliano Richeze (ARG)	Argentina	Villa San Agustín
6 February	Colombia Oro y Paz, Stage 1	UCI America Tour	Fernando Gaviria (COL)	Colombia	Palmira
7 February	Dubai Tour, Stage 2	UCI Asia Tour	Elia Viviani (ITA)	United Arab Emirates	Ras al-Khaimah
7 February	Colombia Oro y Paz, Stage 2	UCI America Tour	Fernando Gaviria (COL)	Colombia	Palmira
8 February	Colombia Oro y Paz, Stage 3	UCI America Tour	Fernando Gaviria (COL)	Colombia	Buga
9 February	Colombia Oro y Paz, Stage 4	UCI America Tour	Julian Alaphilippe (FRA)	Colombia	Alto Boquerón (El Tambo)
10 February	Dubai Tour, Stage 5	UCI Asia Tour	Elia Viviani (ITA)	United Arab Emirates	City Walk, Dubai
10 February	Dubai Tour, Overall	UCI Asia Tour	Elia Viviani (ITA)	United Arab Emirates	
10 February	Dubai Tour, Points Classification	UCI Asia Tour	Elia Viviani (ITA)	United Arab Emirates	
11 February	Colombia Oro y Paz, Points Classification	UCI America Tour	Fernando Gaviria (COL)	Colombia	
22 February	Abu Dhabi Tour, Stage 2	UCI World Tour	Elia Viviani (ITA)	United Arab Emirates	Yas Beach
25 February	Abu Dhabi Tour, Points Classification	UCI World Tour	Elia Viviani (ITA)	United Arab Emirates	
27 February	Le Samyn	UCI Europe Tour	Niki Terpstra (NED)	Belgium	Dour
4 March	Dwars door West–Vlaanderen	UCI Europe Tour	Rémi Cavagna (FRA)	Belgium	Ichtegem
14 March	Nokere Koerse	UCI Europe Tour	Fabio Jakobsen (NED)	Belgium	Nokere
16 March	Handzame Classic	UCI Europe Tour	Álvaro José Hodeg (COL)	Belgium	Handzame
19 March	Volta a Catalunya, Stage 1	UCI World Tour	Álvaro José Hodeg (COL)	Spain	Calella
21 March	Three Days of Bruges–De Panne	UCI Europe Tour	Elia Viviani (ITA)	Belgium	De Panne
23 March	E3 Harelbeke	UCI World Tour	Niki Terpstra (NED)	Belgium	Harelbeke
24 March	Volta a Catalunya, Stage 6	UCI World Tour	Maximilian Schachmann (GER)	Spain	Torrefarrera
28 March	Dwars Door Vlaanderen	UCI World Tour	Yves Lampaert (BEL)	Belgium	Waregem
1 April	Tour of Flanders	UCI World Tour	Niki Terpstra (NED)	Belgium	Oudenaarde
2 April	Tour of the Basque Country, Stage 1	UCI World Tour	Julian Alaphilippe (FRA)	Spain	Zarautz
3 April	Tour of the Basque Country, Stage 2	UCI World Tour	Julian Alaphilippe (FRA)	Spain	Bermeo
4 April	Scheldeprijs	UCI Europe Tour	Fabio Jakobsen (NED)	Belgium	Schoten
7 April	Tour of the Basque Country, Stage 6	UCI World Tour	Enric Mas (ESP)	Spain	Arrate
7 April	Tour of the Basque Country, Youth Classification	UCI World Tour	Enric Mas (ESP)	Spain	
18 April	La Flèche Wallonne	UCI World Tour	Julian Alaphilippe (FRA)	Belgium	Wallonia
22 April	Liège–Bastogne–Liège	UCI World Tour	Bob Jungels (LUX)	Belgium	Liège
5 May	Giro d'Italia, Stage 2	UCI World Tour	Elia Viviani (ITA)	Israel	Tel Aviv
6 May	Giro d'Italia, Stage 3	UCI World Tour	Elia Viviani (ITA)	Israel	Eilat
13 May	Tour of California, Stage 1	UCI World Tour	Fernando Gaviria (COL)	United States	Long Beach
17 May	Tour of California, Stage 5	UCI World Tour	Fernando Gaviria (COL)	United States	Elk Grove, California
18 May	Giro d'Italia, Stage 13	UCI World Tour	Elia Viviani (ITA)	Italy	Nervesa della Battaglia
19 May	Tour of California, Stage 7	UCI World Tour	Fernando Gaviria (COL)	United States	Sacramento
19 May	Tour of California, Points Classification	UCI World Tour	Fernando Gaviria (COL)	United States	
23 May	Giro d'Italia, Stage 17	UCI World Tour	Elia Viviani (ITA)	Italy	Iseo
24 May	Giro d'Italia, Stage 18	UCI World Tour	Maximilian Schachmann (GER)	Italy	Prato Nevoso
27 May	Giro d'Italia, Points Classification	UCI World Tour	Elia Viviani (ITA)	Italy	
3 June	Hammer Limburg, Overall Classification	UCI Europe Tour	(Note: The riders on the squad were Kasper Asgreen, Philippe Gilbert, Álvaro José Hodeg, Yves Lampaert, Davide Martinelli, Enric Mas and Jhonatan Narváez.)	Netherlands	Limburg, Netherlands
7 June	Critérium du Dauphiné, Stage 4	UCI World Tour	Julian Alaphilippe (FRA)	France	Lans-en-Vercors
17 June	Tour de Suisse, Youth Classification	UCI World Tour	Enric Mas (ESP)	Switzerland	
20 June	Adriatica Ionica Race, Stage 1	UCI Europe Tour	Team time trial (Note: The riders on the squad were Kasper Asgreen, Álvaro José Hodeg, James Knox, Davide Martinelli, Jhonatan Narváez, Niki Terpstra and Elia Viviani.)	Italy	Maser
21 June	Adriatica Ionica Race, Stage 2	UCI Europe Tour	Elia Viviani (ITA)	Italy	Maser
23 June	Adriatica Ionica Race, Stage 4	UCI Europe Tour	Elia Viviani (ITA)	Italy	Grado
24 June	Adriatica Ionica Race, Stage 5	UCI Europe Tour	Elia Viviani (ITA)	Italy	Trieste
7 July	Tour de France, Stage 1	UCI World Tour	Fernando Gaviria (COL)	France	Fontenay-Le-Comte
10 July	Tour de France, Stage 4	UCI World Tour	Fernando Gaviria (COL)	France	Sarzeau
17 July	Tour de France, Stage 10	UCI World Tour	Julian Alaphilippe (FRA)	France	Le Grand-Bornand
24 July	Tour de France, Stage 16	UCI World Tour	Julian Alaphilippe (FRA)	France	Bagnères-de-Luchon
4 August	Clásica de San Sebastián	UCI World Tour	Julian Alaphilippe (FRA)	Spain	
6 August	Tour de Pologne, Stage 3	UCI World Tour	Álvaro José Hodeg (COL)	Poland	Zabrze
13 August	BinckBank Tour, Stage 1	UCI World Tour	Fabio Jakobsen (NED)	Netherlands	Bolsward
19 August	EuroEyes Cyclassics	UCI World Tour	Elia Viviani (ITA)	Germany	
23 August	Deutschland Tour, Stage 1	UCI Europe Tour	Álvaro José Hodeg (COL)	Germany	Bonn
24 August	Deutschland Tour, Stage 2	UCI Europe Tour	Maximilian Schachmann (GER)	Germany	Trier
27 August	Vuelta a España, Stage 4	UCI World Tour	Elia Viviani (ITA)	Spain	Alhaurín de la Torre
4 September	Tour of Britain, Stage 3	UCI Europe Tour	Julian Alaphilippe (FRA)	United Kingdom	Bristol
4 September	Vuelta a España, Stage 10	UCI World Tour	Elia Viviani (ITA)	Spain	Fermoselle
9 September	Tour of Britain, Overall classification	UCI Europe Tour	Julian Alaphilippe (FRA)	United Kingdom	
12 September	Okolo Slovenska, Prologue	UCI Europe Tour	Bob Jungels (LUX)	Slovakia	Poprad
13 September	Okolo Slovenska, Stage 1	UCI Europe Tour	Julian Alaphilippe (FRA)	Slovakia	Strbske Pleso
15 September	Vuelta a España, Stage 20	UCI World Tour	Enric Mas (ESP)	Andorra	Coll de la Gallina
16 September	Okolo Slovenska, Stage 4	UCI Europe Tour	Fabio Jakobsen (NED)	Slovakia	Galanta
16 September	Vuelta a España, Stage 21	UCI World Tour	Elia Viviani (ITA)	Spain	Madrid
16 September	Okolo Slovenska, Overall classification	UCI Europe Tour	Julian Alaphilippe (FRA)	Slovakia	
23 September	Grand Prix d'Isbergues	UCI Europe Tour	Philippe Gilbert (BEL)	France	
9 October	Presidential Tour of Turkey, Stage 1	UCI World Tour	Maximiliano Richeze (ARG)	Turkey	Konya

== National, Continental and World champions ==
Date	Discipline	Jersey	Rider	Country	Location
24 June	Belgian National Road Race Champion		Yves Lampaert] (BEL)	Belgium	Binche
28 June	Luxembourgish National Time Trial Champion		Bob Jungels (LUX)	Luxembourg	Redange
30 June	Italian National Road Race Champion		Elia Viviani (ITA)	Italy	Darfo Boario Terme
1 July	Danish National Road Race Champion		Michael Mørkøv (DEN)	Denmark	Nysted
1 July	Luxembourgish National Road Race Champion		Bob Jungels (LUX)	Luxembourg	Redange
23 September	UCI Road World Championships, Team time trial		(Note: The riders on the squad were Niki Terpstra, Maximilian Schachmann, Yves Lampaert, Bob Jungels, Laurens De Plus, and Kasper Asgreen)	Austria	Innsbruck
