= Farazijn =

Farazijn is a surname. Notable people with the surname include:

- Maxime Farazijn (born 1994), Belgian cyclist, son of Peter
- Peter Farazijn (born 1969), Belgian cyclist, father of Maxime
