= 2018 in men's road cycling =

2018 in men's road cycling is about the 2018 men's bicycle races governed by the UCI. The races are part of the UCI Road Calendar.

== World Championships ==
The World Road Championships were held in Innsbruck, Austria, from 22 to 30 September 2018.

Events at the 2018 UCI Road World Championships
Race	Date	Winner	Second	Third	Ref
World Championship Team Time Trial	September 23	(Belgium) Quick-Step Floors	(Germany) Team Sunweb	(United States) BMC Racing Team	
World Championship Time Trial	September 26	Rohan Dennis (AUS)	Tom Dumoulin (NED)	Victor Campenaerts (BEL)	
World Championship Road Race	September 30	Alejandro Valverde (ESP)	Romain Bardet (FRA)	Michael Woods (CAN)	

== Grand Tours ==
Grand Tours in the 2018 season
Race	Date	Winner	Second	Third	Ref
(Italy) Giro d'Italia	May 5–27	Chris Froome (GBR)	Tom Dumoulin (NED)	Miguel Ángel López (COL)	
Tour de France	July 7–29	Geraint Thomas (GBR)	Tom Dumoulin (NED)	Chris Froome (GBR)	
(Spain) Vuelta a España	August 25 – September 16	Simon Yates (GBR)	Enric Mas (ESP)	Miguel Ángel López (COL)	

== UCI World Tour ==
For the 2018 season, the UCI World Tour calendar contains the same events as in 2017.

Race	Date	Winner	Second	Third	Ref
(Australia) Santos Tour Down Under	January 16–21	Daryl Impey (RSA)	Richie Porte (AUS)	Tom-Jelte Slagter (NED)	
(Australia) Cadel Evans Great Ocean Road Race	January 28	Jay McCarthy (AUS)	Elia Viviani (ITA)	Daryl Impey (RSA)	
(United Arab Emirates) Abu Dhabi Tour	February 21–25	Alejandro Valverde (ESP)	Wilco Kelderman (NED)	Miguel Ángel López (COL)	
(Belgium) Omloop Het Nieuwsblad	February 24	Michael Valgren (DEN)	Łukasz Wiśniowski (POL)	Sep Vanmarcke (BEL)	
(Italy) Strade Bianche	March 3	Tiesj Benoot (BEL)	Romain Bardet (FRA)	Wout Van Aert (BEL)	
(France) Paris–Nice	March 4–11	Marc Soler (ESP)	Simon Yates (GBR)	Gorka Izagirre (ESP)	
(Italy) Tirreno–Adriatico	March 7–13	Michał Kwiatkowski (POL)	Damiano Caruso (ITA)	Geraint Thomas (GBR)	
(Italy) Milan–San Remo	March 17	Vincenzo Nibali (ITA)	Caleb Ewan (AUS)	Arnaud Démare (FRA)	
(Spain) Volta Ciclista a Catalunya	March 19–25	Alejandro Valverde (ESP)	Nairo Quintana (COL)	Pierre Latour (FRA)	
(Belgium) Record Bank E3 Harelbeke	March 23	Niki Terpstra (NED)	Philippe Gilbert (BEL)	Greg Van Avermaet (BEL)	
(Belgium) Gent–Wevelgem	March 25	Peter Sagan (SVK)	Elia Viviani (ITA)	Arnaud Démare (FRA)	
(Belgium) Dwars door Vlaanderen	March 28	Yves Lampaert (BEL)	Mike Teunissen (NED)	Sep Vanmarcke (BEL)	
(Belgium) Ronde van Vlaanderen	April 1	Niki Terpstra (NED)	Mads Pedersen (DEN)	Philippe Gilbert (BEL)	
(Spain) Vuelta al País Vasco	April 2–7	Primož Roglič (SLO)	Mikel Landa (ESP)	Ion Izagirre (ESP)	
(France) Paris–Roubaix	April 8	Peter Sagan (SVK)	Silvan Dillier (SUI)	Niki Terpstra (NED)	
(Netherlands) Amstel Gold Race	April 15	Michael Valgren (DEN)	Roman Kreuziger (CZE)	Enrico Gasparotto (ITA)	
(Belgium) La Flèche Wallonne	April 18	Julian Alaphilippe (FRA)	Alejandro Valverde (ESP)	Jelle Vanendert (BEL)	
(Belgium) Liège–Bastogne–Liège	April 22	Bob Jungels (LUX)	Michael Woods (CAN)	Romain Bardet (FRA)	
(Switzerland) Tour de Romandie	April 24–29	Primož Roglič (SLO)	Egan Bernal (COL)	Richie Porte (AUS)	
(Germany) Eschborn–Frankfurt	May 1	Alexander Kristoff (NOR)	Michael Matthews (AUS)	Oliver Naesen (BEL)	
(United States) Amgen Tour of California	May 13–19	Egan Bernal (COL)	Tejay van Garderen (USA)	Daniel Martínez (COL)	
(France) Critérium du Dauphiné	June 3–10	Geraint Thomas (GBR)	Adam Yates (GBR)	Romain Bardet (FRA)	
(Switzerland) Tour de Suisse	June 9–17	Richie Porte (AUS)	Jakob Fuglsang (DEN)	Nairo Quintana (COL)	
(United Kingdom) Prudential RideLondon–Surrey Classic	July 29	Pascal Ackermann (GER)	Elia Viviani (ITA)	Giacomo Nizzolo (ITA)	
(Spain) Clásica Ciclista San Sebastián	August 4	Julian Alaphilippe (FRA)	Bauke Mollema (NED)	Anthony Roux (FRA)	
(Poland) Tour de Pologne	August 4–10	Michał Kwiatkowski (POL)	Simon Yates (GBR)	Thibaut Pinot (FRA)	
(Belgium) (Netherlands) BinckBank Tour	August 13–19	Matej Mohorič (SLO)	Michael Matthews (AUS)	Tim Wellens (BEL)	
(Germany) EuroEyes Cyclassics Hamburg	August 19	Elia Viviani (ITA)	Arnaud Démare (FRA)	Alexander Kristoff (NOR)	
Bretagne Classic Ouest-France	August 26	Oliver Naesen (BEL)	Michael Valgren (DEN)	Tim Wellens (BEL)	
(Canada) Grand Prix Cycliste de Québec	September 7	Michael Matthews (AUS)	Greg Van Avermaet (BEL)	Jasper Stuyven (BEL)	
(Canada) Grand Prix Cycliste de Montréal	September 9	Michael Matthews (AUS)	Sonny Colbrelli (ITA)	Greg Van Avermaet (BEL)	
Presidential Cycling Tour of Turkey	October 9–14	Eduard Prades (ESP)	Alexey Lutsenko (KAZ)	Nathan Haas (AUS)	
(Italy) Il Lombardia	October 13	Thibaut Pinot (FRA)	Vincenzo Nibali (ITA)	Dylan Teuns (BEL)	
(China) Gree-Tour of Guangxi	October 16–21	Gianni Moscon (ITA)	Felix Großschartner (AUT)	Sergey Chernetskiy (RUS)	

== UCI tours ==
Tour	Individual champion	Team champion	Nations champion
UCI World Ranking	Alejandro Valverde (ESP)	No team ranking	Belgium
World Tour	Simon Yates (GBR)	Quick-Step Floors	No nation ranking
Africa Tour	Joseph Areruya (RWA)	Sovac–Natura4Ever	Eritrea
America Tour	Gavin Mannion (USA)	UnitedHealthcare	Colombia
Asia Tour	Alexey Lutsenko (KAZ)	Kinan Cycling Team	Kazakhstan
Europe Tour	Hugo Hofstetter (FRA)	Wanty–Groupe Gobert	Belgium
Oceania Tour	Chris Harper (AUS)	Bennelong SwissWellness Cycling Team	Australia

== 2.HC Category Races ==
Race	Date	Winner	Second	Third	Ref
(United Arab Emirates) Dubai Tour	February 6–10	Elia Viviani (ITA)	Magnus Cort (DEN)	Sonny Colbrelli (ITA)	
Tour of Oman	February 13–18	Alexey Lutsenko (KAZ)	Miguel Ángel López (COL)	Gorka Izagirre (ESP)	
(Spain) Vuelta a Andalucía	February 14–18	Tim Wellens (BEL)	Wout Poels (NED)	Marc Soler (ESP)	
(Portugal) Volta ao Algarve em Bicicleta	February 14–18	Michał Kwiatkowski (POL)	Geraint Thomas (GBR)	Tejay van Garderen (USA)	
(Malaysia) Le Tour de Langkawi	March 18–25	Artem Ovechkin (RUS)	Łukasz Owsian (POL)	Ben Dyball (AUS)	
(Italy) Tour of the Alps	April 16–20	Thibaut Pinot (FRA)	Domenico Pozzovivo (ITA)	Miguel Ángel López (COL)	
Tour of Croatia	April 17–22	Kanstantsin Sivtsov (BLR)	Pieter Weening (NED)	Yevgeniy Gidich (KAZ)	
(France) Four Days of Dunkirk	May 8–13	Dimitri Claeys (BEL)	André Greipel (GER)	Oscar Riesebeek (NED)	
Tour of Norway	May 16–20	Eduard Prades (ESP)	Alexander Kamp (DEN)	Edvald Boasson Hagen (NOR)	
(Norway) Tour des Fjords	May 22–24	Michael Albasini (SUI)	Bjorg Lambrecht (BEL)	Pim Ligthart (NED)	
Baloise Belgium Tour	May 23–27	Jens Keukeleire (BEL)	Jelle Vanendert (BEL)	Dion Smith (NZL)	
Skoda-Tour de Luxembourg	May 30 – June 3	Andrea Pasqualon (ITA)	Jan Tratnik (SLO)	Pit Leyder (LUX)	
(China) Tour of Qinghai Lake	July 22 – August 4	Hernán Aguirre (COL)	Hernando Bohórquez (COL)	Radoslav Rogina (CRO)	
(Belgium) VOO-Tour de Wallonie	July 28 – August 1	Tim Wellens (BEL)	Quinten Hermans (BEL)	Pieter Serry (BEL)	
(Denmark) PostNord Danmark Rundt	August 1–5	Wout van Aert (BEL)	Rasmus Quaade (DEN)	Lasse Norman Hansen (DEN)	
(United States) The Larry H. Miller Tour of Utah	August 6–12	Sepp Kuss (USA)	Ben Hermans (BEL)	Jack Haig (AUS)	
(Spain) Vuelta a Burgos	August 7–11	Iván Sosa (COL)	Miguel Ángel López (COL)	David de la Cruz (ESP)	
Arctic Race of Norway	August 8–12	Sergey Chernetskiy (RUS)	Markus Hoelgaard (NOR)	Colin Joyce (USA)	
(United States) Colorado Classic	August 16–19	Gavin Mannion (USA)	Serghei Țvetcov (ROU)	Hugh Carthy (GBR)	
(United Kingdom) Tour of Britain	September 2–9	Julian Alaphilippe (FRA)	Wout Poels (NED)	Primož Roglič (SLO)	
(China) Tour of Hainan	October 23–31	Fausto Masnada (ITA)	Gino Mäder (SUI)	Julien El Fares (FRA)	

== 1.HC Category Races ==
Race	Date	Winner	Second	Third	Ref
(Spain) Clásica de Almería	February 11	Caleb Ewan (AUS)	Danny van Poppel (NED)	Timothy Dupont (BEL)	
(Italy) Trofeo Laigueglia	February 11	Moreno Moser (ITA)	Paolo Totò (ITA)	Matteo Busato (ITA)	
(Belgium) Kuurne–Brussels–Kuurne	February 25	Dylan Groenewegen (NED)	Arnaud Démare (FRA)	Sonny Colbrelli (ITA)	
(Italy) GP Industria & Artigianato	March 4	Matej Mohorič (SLO)	Marco Canola (ITA)	Davide Ballerini (ITA)	
(Netherlands) Ronde van Drenthe	March 11	František Sisr (CZE)	Dries De Bondt (BEL)	Preben Van Hecke (BEL)	
(Belgium) Nokere Koerse	March 14	Fabio Jakobsen (NED)	Amaury Capiot (BEL)	Hugo Hofstetter (FRA)	
(Belgium) Handzame Classic	March 16	Álvaro José Hodeg (COL)	Kristoffer Halvorsen (NOR)	Pascal Ackermann (GER)	
(France) GP de Denain	March 18	Kenny Dehaes (BEL)	Hugo Hofstetter (FRA)	Julien Duval (FRA)	
(Belgium) Three Days of De Panne	March 21	Elia Viviani (ITA)	Pascal Ackermann (GER)	Jasper Philipsen (BEL)	
(Belgium) Scheldeprijs	April 4	Fabio Jakobsen (NED)	Pascal Ackermann (GER)	Chris Lawless (GBR)	
(Belgium) Brabantse Pijl	April 11	Tim Wellens (BEL)	Sonny Colbrelli (ITA)	Tiesj Benoot (BEL)	
(Switzerland) GP du canton d'Argovie	June 7	Alexander Kristoff (NOR)	Francesco Gavazzi (ITA)	Marco Canola (ITA)	
(Belgium) Brussels Cycling Classic	September 1	Pascal Ackermann (GER)	Jasper Stuyven (BEL)	Thomas Boudat (FRA)	
(France) GP de Fourmies	September 2	Pascal Ackermann (GER)	Arnaud Démare (FRA)	Álvaro José Hodeg (COL)	
(Belgium) Primus Classic	September 15	Taco van der Hoorn (NED)	Huub Duijn (NED)	Frederik Frison (BEL)	
(Belgium) Tour de l'Eurométropole	September 22	Mads Pedersen (DEN)	Jempy Drucker (LUX)	Oliver Naesen (BEL)	
(Germany) Sparkassen Münsterland Giro	October 3	Max Walscheid (GER)	John Degenkolb (GER)	Nils Politt (GER)	
(Italy) Giro dell'Emilia	October 6	Alessandro De Marchi (ITA)	Rigoberto Urán (COL)	Dylan Teuns (BEL)	
(France) Paris–Tours	October 7	Søren Kragh Andersen (DEN)	Niki Terpstra (NED)	Benoît Cosnefroy (FRA)	
(Italy) GP Bruno Beghelli	October 7	Bauke Mollema (NED)	Carlos Barbero (ESP)	Manuel Belletti (ITA)	
(Italy) Tre Valli Varesine	October 9	Toms Skujiņš (LAT)	Thibaut Pinot (FRA)	Peter Kennaugh (GBR)	
(Italy) Milano–Torino	October 10	Thibaut Pinot (FRA)	Miguel Ángel López (COL)	Alejandro Valverde (ESP)	
(Italy) Gran Piemonte	October 11	Sonny Colbrelli (ITA)	Florian Sénéchal (FRA)	Davide Ballerini (ITA)	
Japan Cup	October 21	Robert Power (AUS)	Antwan Tolhoek (NED)	Matti Breschel (DEN)	

== Championships ==
=== Continental Championships ===
Championships	Race	Date	Winner	Second	Third	Ref
African Championships; Rwanda	Road race	February 18	Amanuel Gebreigzabhier (ERI)	Metkel Eyob (ERI)	Azzedine Lagab (ALG)	
African Championships; Rwanda	Individual time trial	February 15	Mekseb Debesay (ERI)	Jean Bosco Nsengimana (RWA)	Joseph Areruya (RWA)	
African Championships; Rwanda	Team time trial	February 14	Eritrea	Rwanda	Algeria	
Pan American Championships; Argentina	Road race	May 6	Juan Sebastián Molano (COL)	Maximiliano Richeze (ARG)	Cristopher Mansilla (CHI)	
Pan American Championships; Argentina	Individual time trial	May 3	Walter Vargas (COL)	Rubén Ramos (ARG)	Manuel Rodas (GUA)	
Asian Championships; Myanmar	Road race	February 12	Yousif Mirza (UAE)	Fumiyuki Beppu (JPN)	Mehdi Sohrabi (IRI)	
Asian Championships; Myanmar	Individual time trial	February 10	Cheung King Lok (HKG)	Choe Hyeong-min (KOR)	Arvin Moazemi (IRI)	
Asian Championships; Myanmar	Team time trial	February 8	Japan	Iran	Hong Kong	
European Championships; Great Britain	Road race	August 5–12	Matteo Trentin (ITA)	Mathieu van der Poel (NED)	Wout van Aert (BEL)	
European Championships; Great Britain	Individual time trial	August 5–12	Victor Campenaerts (BEL)	Jonathan Castroviejo (ESP)	Maximilian Schachmann (GER)	
Oceanian Championships; Australia	Road race	March 25	Chris Harper (AUS)	James Whelan (AUS)	Cyrus Monk (AUS)	
Oceanian Championships; Australia	Individual time trial	March 23	Hamish Bond (NZL)	Sean Lake (AUS)	James Ogilvie (AUS)	

== UCI Teams ==
=== UCI WorldTeams ===
The UCI has granted a UCI WorldTour licence to the following eighteen teams:

- (Australia) Mitchelton–Scott
- Bahrain–Merida
- (Belgium) Lotto–Soudal
- (Belgium) Quick-Step Floors
- (France) AG2R La Mondiale
- (France) FDJ
- (Germany) Bora–Hansgrohe
- (Germany) Team Sunweb
- (United Kingdom) Team Sky
- (Kazakhstan) Astana
- (Netherlands) LottoNL–Jumbo
- (South Africa) Team Dimension Data
- (Spain) Movistar Team
- (Switzerland) Team Katusha–Alpecin
- (United Arab Emirates) UAE Team Emirates
- (United States) BMC Racing Team
- (United States) EF Education First–Drapac p/b Cannondale
- (United States) Trek–Segafredo
