= 2017 Ronde van Drenthe =

2017 UCI Europe Tour, race 2 of 20
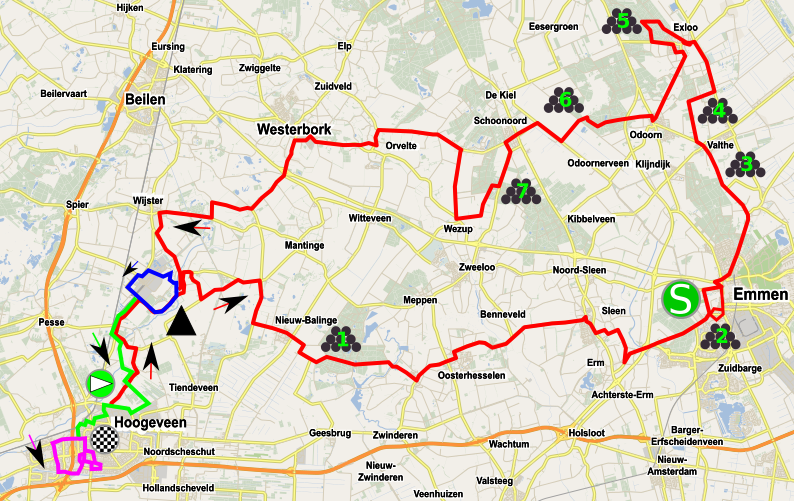

Race details
- Dates: 11 March 2017
- Stages: 1
- Distance: 206.2 km (128.1 mi)
- Winning time: 4h 48' 55"

Results
	Winner	Jan-Willem van Schip (NED)
	Second	Twan Castelijns (NED)
	Third	Jasper De Buyst (BEL)

The 2017 Ronde van Drenthe was the 55th edition of the Ronde van Drenthe road cycling one day race. It was held on 11 March 2017 as part of the UCI Europe Tour in category 1.1.

The race was won by Jan-Willem van Schip of Delta Cycling Rotterdam.

== Teams ==
Twenty-one teams of up to eight riders started the race:

UCI WorldTeams

- Lotto–Soudal
- LottoNL–Jumbo

UCI Professional Continental teams

- Roompot–Nederlandse Loterij
- CCC–Sprandi–Polkowice
- Gazprom–RusVelo
- Nippo–Vini Fantini
- Vérandas Willems–Crelan
- Aqua Blue Sport
- Israel Cycling Academy
- Sport Vlaanderen–Baloise
- Wanty–Groupe Gobert
- Fortuneo–Vital Concept

UCI Continental teams

- Baby-Dump Cyclingteam
- Delta Cycling Rotterdam
- Metec–TKH
- Riwal Platform
- Team Coop
- Bike Channel–Canyon
- Destil–Jo Piels
- Monkey Town Continental Team
- SEG Racing Academy

== Result ==
Final general classification

Rank	Rider	Team	Time
1	Jan-Willem van Schip (NED)	Delta Cycling Rotterdam	4h 48' 55"
2	Twan Castelijns (NED)	LottoNL–Jumbo	s.t.
3	Preben Van Hecke (BEL)	Lotto–Soudal	+ 11"
4	Adam Blythe (GBR)	Aqua Blue Sport	s.t.
5	Elmar Reinders (NED)	Roompot–Nederlandse Loterij	s.t.
6	Danilo Napolitano (ITA)	Wanty–Groupe Gobert	s.t.
7	Chris Opie (GBR)	Bike Channel–Canyon	s.t.
8	Twan Brusselman (NED)	Destil–Jo Piels	s.t.
9	Maxime Farazijn (BEL)	Sport Vlaanderen–Baloise	s.t.
10	František Sisr (CZE)	CCC–Sprandi–Polkowice	s.t.
