= 2018 Tour de France =

2018 UCI World Tour, race 25 of 37
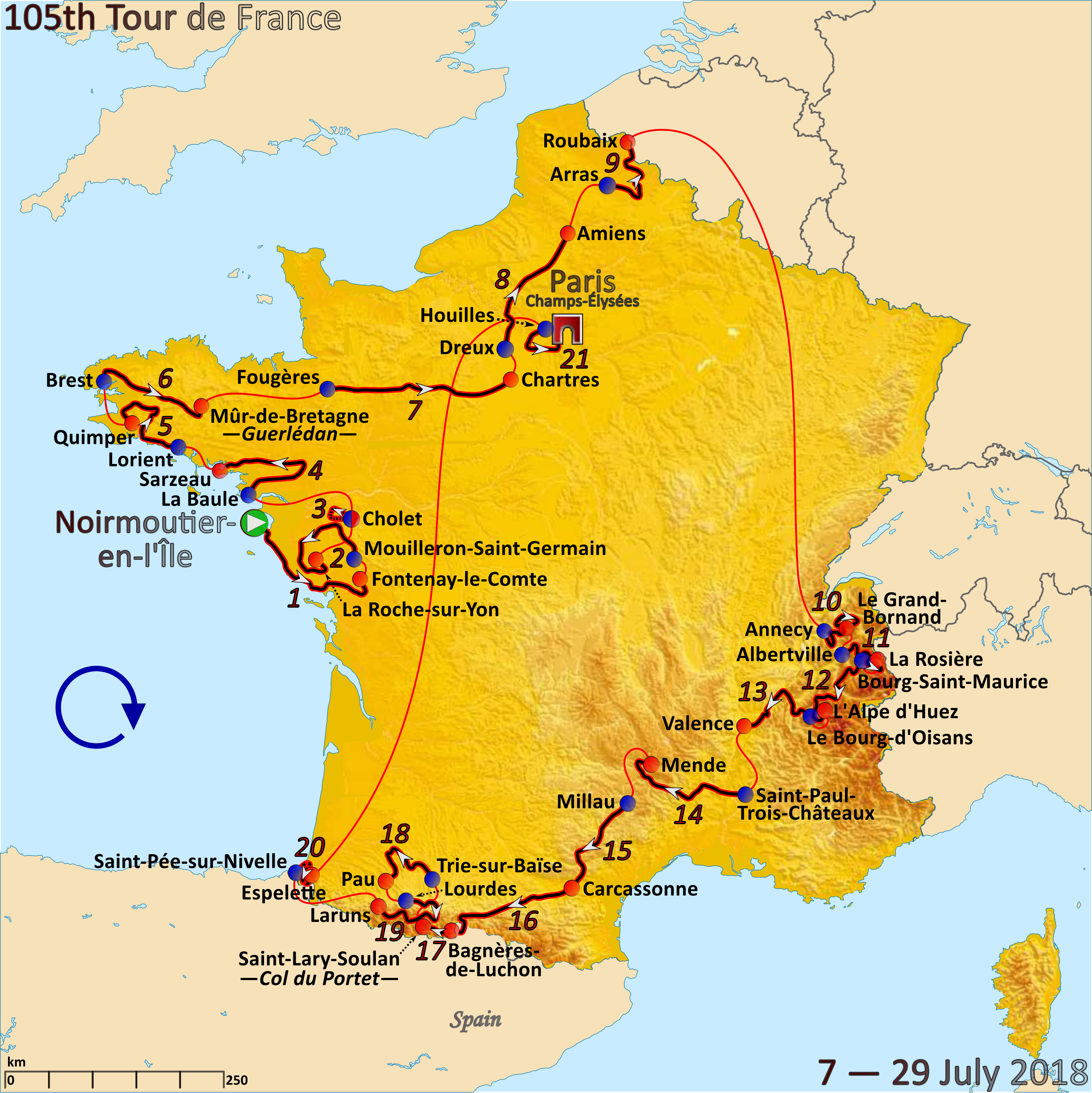
- Route of the 2018 Tour de France

Race details
- Dates: 7–29 July 2018
- Stages: 21
- Distance: 3,351 km (2,082 mi)
- Winning time: 83h 17' 13"

Results
| Jersey awarded to the overall winner | Winner | Geraint Thomas (GBR) | (Team Sky) |
| | Second | Tom Dumoulin (NED) | (Team Sunweb) |
| | Third | Chris Froome (GBR) | (Team Sky) |
| Jersey awarded to the points classification winner | Points | Peter Sagan (SVK) | (Bora–Hansgrohe) |
| Jersey awarded to the mountains classification winner | Mountains | Julian Alaphilippe (FRA) | (Quick-Step Floors) |
| Jersey awarded to the young rider classification winner | Young rider | Pierre Latour (FRA) | (AG2R La Mondiale) |
| Jersey awarded to the combativity classification winner | Combativity | Dan Martin (IRL) | (UAE Team Emirates) |
| Jersey awarded to the team classification winner | Team | (Spain) Movistar Team | |

The 2018 Tour de France was the 105th edition of the Tour de France, one of cycling's three Grand Tours. The 3,351 km (2,082 mi)-long race consisted of 21 stages, starting on 7 July in Noirmoutier-en-l'Île, in western France, and concluding on 29 July with the Champs-Élysées stage in Paris. A total of 176 riders from 22 teams participated in the race. The overall general classification was won by Geraint Thomas of Team Sky. Tom Dumoulin (Team Sunweb) placed second, with Thomas's teammate and four-time Tour winner Chris Froome coming third.

The opening stage was won by Fernando Gaviria of Quick-Step Floors, who became the Tour's first rider to wear the general classification leader's yellow jersey. Peter Sagan (Bora–Hansgrohe) then took the race lead on the following stage. BMC Racing Team won stage three's team time trial, putting their rider Greg Van Avermaet in yellow. He held the jersey for eight days until the second stage of the three Alpine stages, which Thomas won and took the lead in. He successfully defended it from Dumoulin for the rest of the Tour, which included three stages in the Pyrenees and the penultimate stage's individual time trial, the latter won by Dumoulin.

Sagan, who won three stages, was placed first in the points classification for the sixth time. Julian Alaphilippe of Quick-Step Floors, winner of two mountain stages, won the mountains classification, and AG2R La Mondiale's Pierre Latour won the young rider classification. The team classification was won by Movistar Team, and Dan Martin of UAE Team Emirates won the combativity award.

== Teams ==
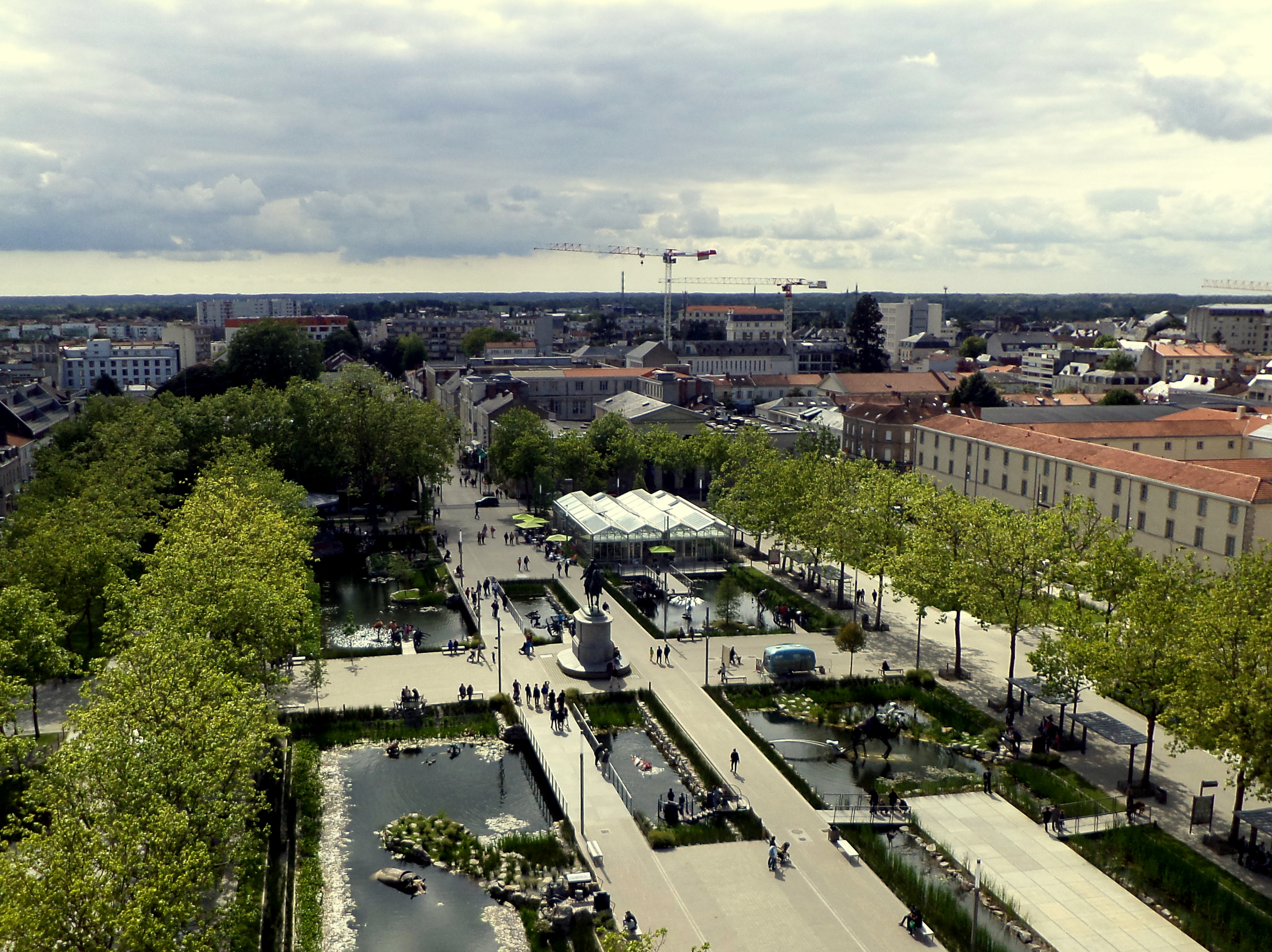
The Place Napoléon square in La Roche-sur-Yon, hosted the team presentation ceremony on 5 July.

The 2018 edition of the Tour de France consisted of 22 teams. The race was the 25th of the 37 events in the UCI World Tour, and all of its eighteen UCI WorldTeams were entitled, and obliged, to enter the race. On 6 January 2018, organisers of the Tour, the Amaury Sport Organisation (ASO), announced the four second-tier UCI Professional Continental teams that received a wildcard invitation to participate in the event. The four teams were Cofidis, Direct Énergie, Fortuneo–Samsic, from France, and Belgium's Wanty–Groupe Gobert, all of which have participated in the race before. This meant that new French team Vital Concept, with their team leader, sprinter Bryan Coquard, missed out on the race. The presentation of the teams – where the members of each team's roster are introduced in front of the media and local dignitaries – took place on Place Napoleon in the town of La Roche-sur-Yon on 5 July, two days before the opening stage.

New rules by the cycling's governing body, the Union Cycliste Internationale (UCI), reduced the number of riders per team for Grand Tours from 9 to 8, resulting in a start list total of 176, instead of 198, which had been the number of starters since 2010. Of these, 35 competed in their first Tour de France. The riders came from 30 countries. Seven countries had more than 10 riders in the race: France (35), Belgium (19), the Netherlands (13), Italy (13), Australia (11), Germany (11) and Spain (11). The average age of riders in the race was 29.37 years, ranging from the 21-year-old Egan Bernal (Team Sky) to the 40-year-old Franco Pellizotti (Bahrain–Merida). Groupama–FDJ had the youngest average age while Bahrain–Merida had the oldest.

The teams entering the race were:

UCI WorldTeams

- AG2R La Mondiale
- Astana
- Bahrain–Merida
- BMC Racing Team
- Bora–Hansgrohe
- EF Education First–Drapac p/b Cannondale
- Team Dimension Data
- Groupama–FDJ
- Team Katusha–Alpecin
- LottoNL–Jumbo
- Lotto–Soudal
- Movistar Team
- Mitchelton–Scott
- Quick-Step Floors
- Team Sky
- Team Sunweb
- Trek–Segafredo
- UAE Team Emirates

UCI Professional Continental teams

- Cofidis
- Direct Énergie
- Fortuneo–Samsic
- Wanty–Groupe Gobert

== Pre-race favourites ==
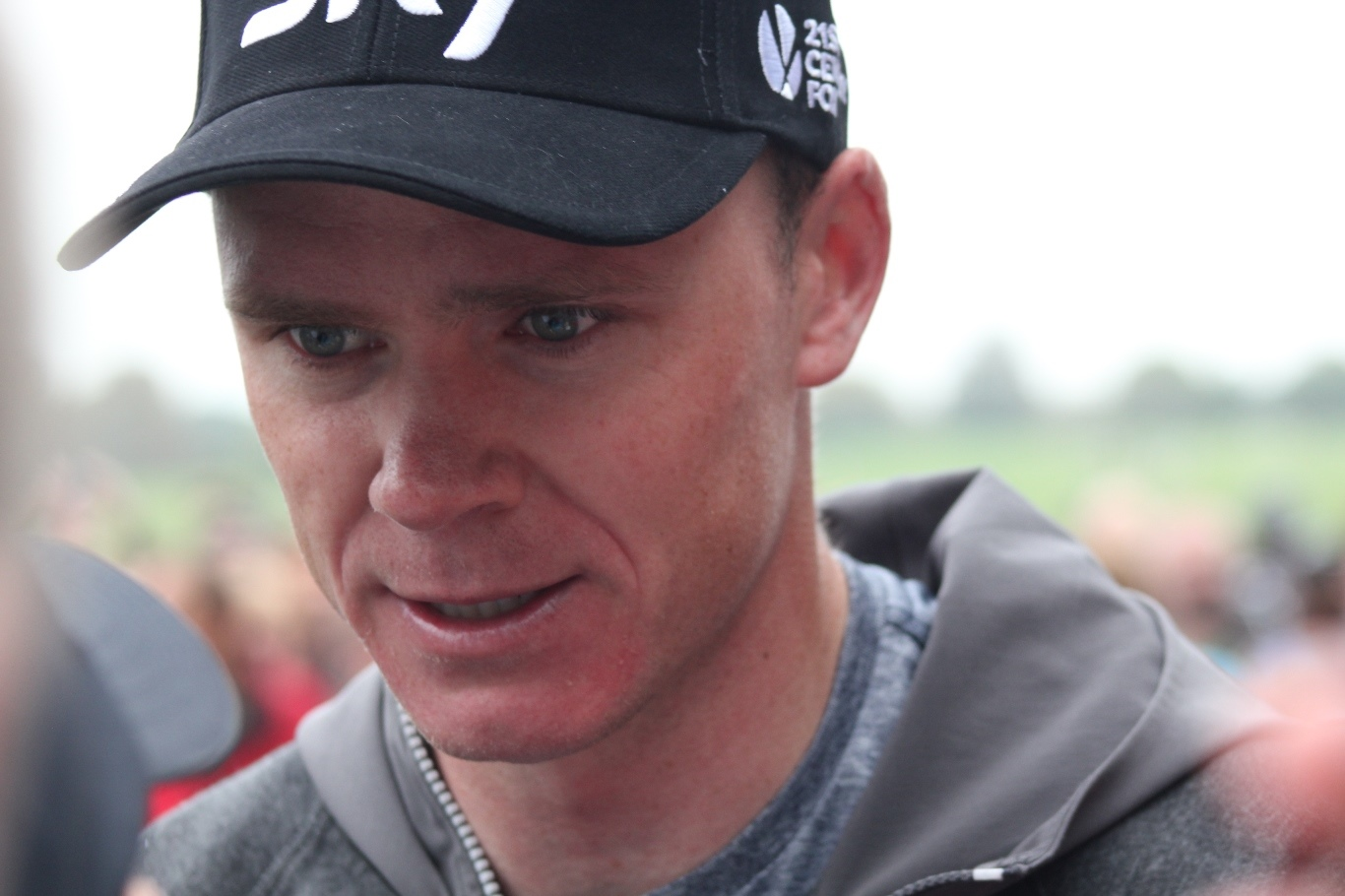
Defending champion Chris Froome (pictured at the 2018 Tour of Britain) had been considered the favourite for the general classification.

In the lead up to the Tour, the favourite for the general classification was Chris Froome of Team Sky. Froome had won the 2013, 2015, 2016 and 2017 editions of the Tour, and was also the current defending champion at both other Grand Tours, the Vuelta a España and the Giro d'Italia. However, Froome's participation was unconfirmed due to an ongoing anti-doping investigation that began in December 2017, when it was announced that he had returned a urine sample taken at the Vuelta (which had taken place two months earlier) which contained twice his allowed amount of the asthma drug salbutamol. This was considered not as a positive doping result, but as an "Adverse Analytical Finding" (AAF), meaning that he was allowed to continue racing until the case was resolved. He did however face the possibility of losing his Vuelta victory and all subsequent results. The ASO were unhappy with the situation, which was very similar to that of the 2011 Tour pre-race favourite Alberto Contador, who started the tour with his case over a positive test for clenbuterol still unresolved. The UCI conducted an investigation into the AAF, which was still unresolved at the time that Froome won the Giro in May 2018. With an outcome before the start of the Tour unlikely, the ASO attempted to bar Froome from starting the race, citing article 28 of the race's rules, saying that the organiser "expressly reserves the right to refuse participation in – or to exclude from – the event, a team or any of its members whose presence would be such as to damage the image or reputation of ASO or the event". Froome was cleared by the UCI on 2 July, five days before the start of the Tour, with a press statement reading that the authorities had found sufficient evidence "that Mr Froome's sample results do not constitute an AAF". He was thereafter cleared to start the Tour by the ASO as well.

The closest rivals of Froome were thought to be Romain Bardet (AG2R La Mondiale), Tom Dumoulin (Team Sunweb), Mikel Landa (Movistar Team), Vincenzo Nibali (Bahrain–Merida), Richie Porte (BMC Racing Team), Nairo Quintana (Movistar Team) and Adam Yates (Mitchelton–Scott). Porte's best result in the Tour was fifth overall in 2016. He had shown his form so far in the 2018 season by winning the general classification of Tour de Suisse. Although Quintana had placed twelfth overall in the 2017 Tour, his 2018 season so far had been consistent and he had finished second behind Froome in previous Tours. He came to the Tour with a strong team, which included contender Landa, who in 2018 had moved to Movistar from Sky after being a domestique for Froome. The 2017 Giro winner Dumoulin placed second in the 2018 Giro. Nibali had recently won the classic Milan–San Remo, one of cycling's five one-day race "monuments". He had however failed to impress in the stage races leading up to the Tour, finishing 24th in the Critérium du Dauphiné after finishing outside the top 10 in the general classifications at Dubai Tour, Tour of Oman and the Tirreno–Adriatico. He was the only rider on the start list apart from Froome to have won a Tour, the 2014 edition. Bardet finished second and third overall in the two previous Tours and placed third in the Critérium du Dauphiné leading up to the 2018 Tour. Yates' best overall Tour result was fourth 2016; he had shown his form during the season before the Tour with top-five placings in four stage races, including second in the Dauphiné.

Some of the other riders considered as contenders for the general classification were Dan Martin (UAE Team Emirates), Alejandro Valverde (Movistar Team), Rigoberto Urán (EF Education First–Drapac p/b Cannondale), Geraint Thomas (Team Sky) and Primož Roglič (LottoNL–Jumbo).

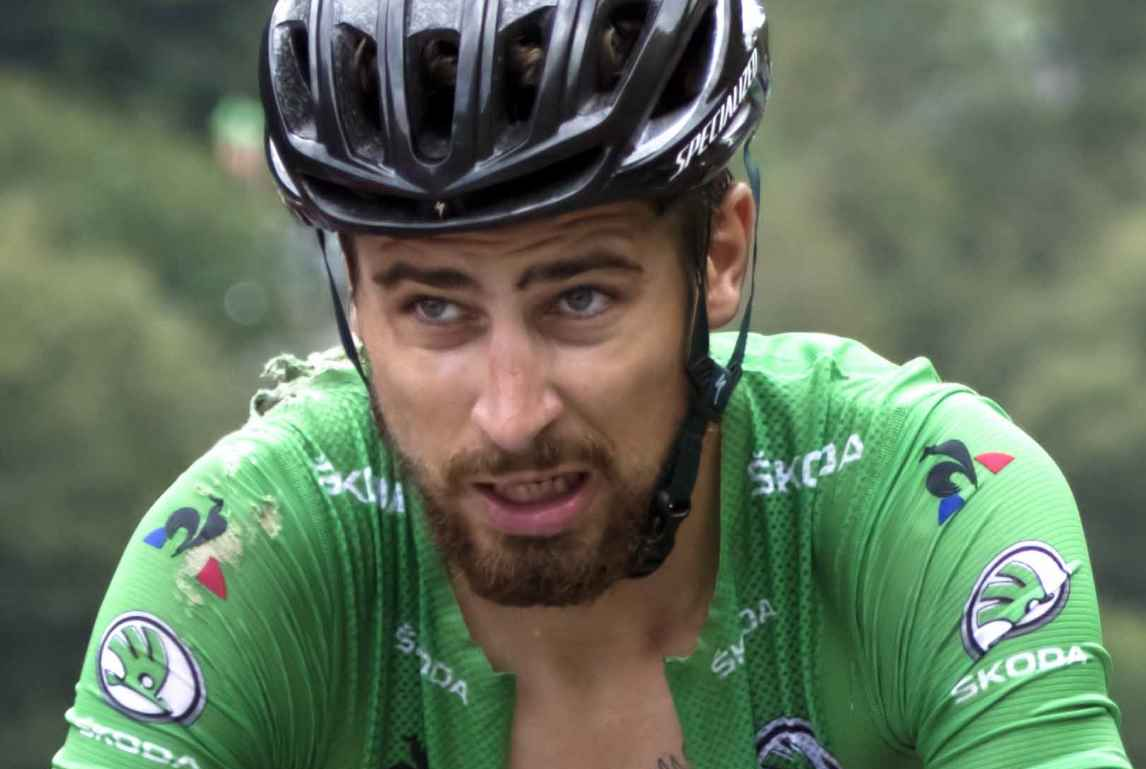
Peter Sagan (pictured on stage seventeen) was the pre-race favourite for the points classification.

The sprinters considered favourites for the points classification and wins on the flat or hilly bunch sprint finishes were Peter Sagan (Bora–Hansgrohe), Michael Matthews (Team Sunweb), Fernando Gaviria (Quick-Step Floors), Marcel Kittel (Team Katusha–Alpecin), Mark Cavendish (Team Dimension Data), Dylan Groenewegen (LottoNL–Jumbo), Arnaud Démare (Groupama–FDJ) and André Greipel (Lotto–Soudal). Others expected to contend for sprint finishes included Greg Van Avermaet (BMC Racing Team), Alexander Kristoff (UAE Team Emirates), Sonny Colbrelli (Bahrain–Merida), Nacer Bouhanni (Groupama–FDJ) and John Degenkolb (Trek–Segafredo). Triple reigning world road race champion Sagan had won the five previous points classifications of the Tour before his 2017 Tour disqualification after race officials judged that he caused Cavendish to crash. Sagan was again aiming to equal Erik Zabel's record of six points classifications. He was in good form during the season before the Tour, winning the one-day races Paris–Roubaix and Gent–Wevelgem, multiple top ten results one-day races and two points classifications in stage races. Matthews, who won the 2017 Tour's points classification, suffered an early season injury and his sole win for the season was at the Tour de Romandie. Kittel had won fourteen Tour stages, five in 2017, gained two wins so far in 2018, both at the Tirreno–Adriatico. Debutant Gaviria had been second to Kittel at Quick-Step Floors before the latter moved to Team Katusha–Alpecin for the 2018 season. Gaviria amassed a total of seven wins so far in 2018, and additionally the points classification at the Tour of California. The 2011 points classification winner Cavendish's win at the Dubai Tour in February was his only of 2018 so far. Winner of the 2017 Tour's final stage Groenewegen had a total of nine victories for the season going into the Tour, with one coming at Paris–Nice. Démare, who led the points classification in the 2017 Tour, had gained two wins at Paris–Nice and the Tour de Suisse in 2018 before the Tour. Greipel, who turned 36 during the Tour, had taken six wins at stage races during 2018 before the Tour, as well as the points classification of the Tour of Belgium.

== Route and stages ==
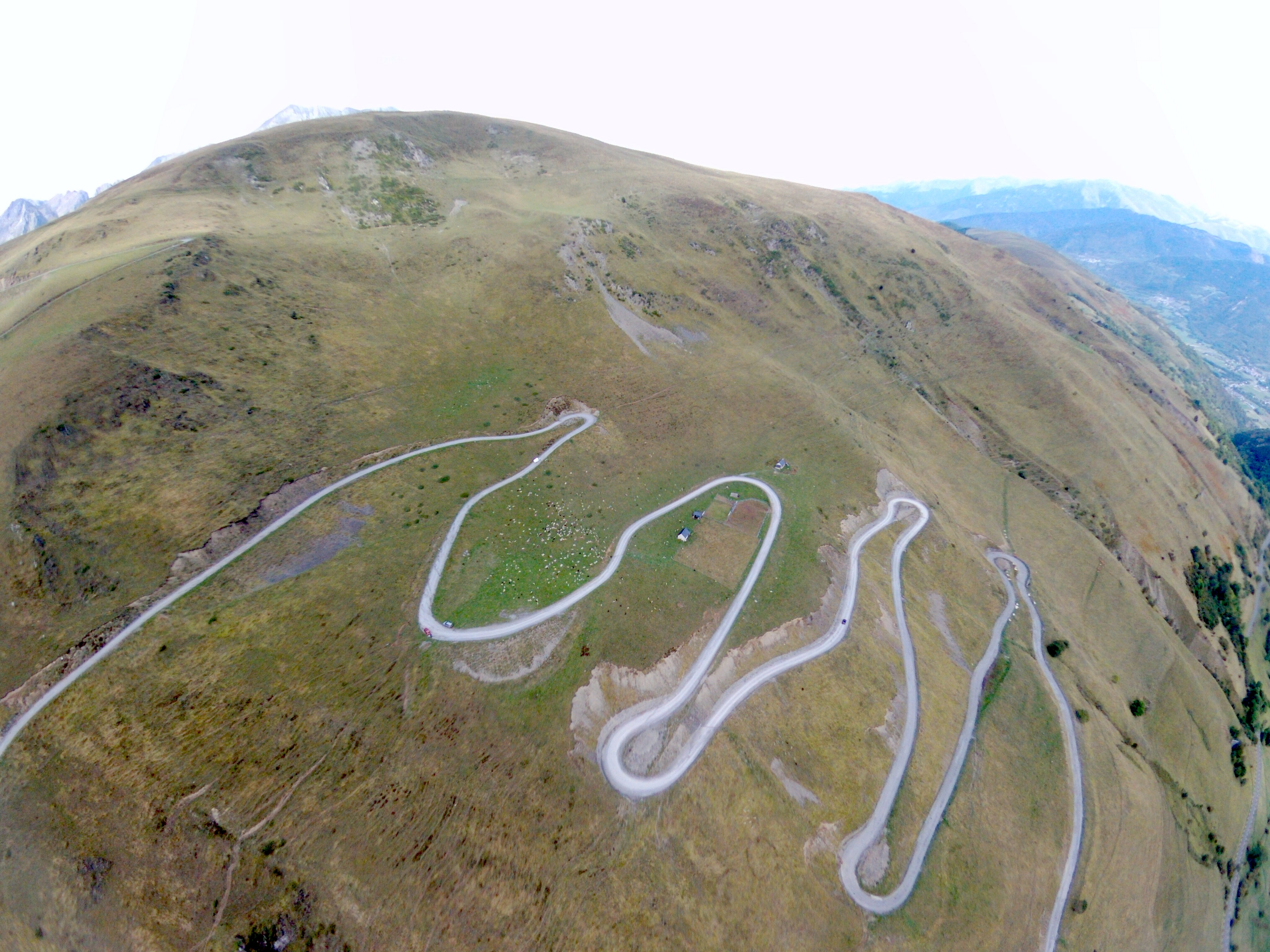
The highest point of elevation in the race was the Col de Portet Pyrenean pass, at 2,215 m (7,267 ft). It was used for the first time in the Tour de France.

On 12 February 2017, at a rugby union match between France and Scotland at Paris's Stade de France, race director Christian Prudhomme announced the opening stages of the 2018 Tour (known as the Grand Départ) would take place in the Vendée department, in the Pays de la Loire region. Since the inaugural Tour in 1903, the Vendée has hosted the Grand Départ five times, with the last in 2011. Two weeks after the announcement, the ASO revealed that the Grand Départ would take place over three stages, with the third a team time trial. In June 2017, the UCI's Professional Cycling Council (PCC) moved the start of the Tour a week later than usual and originally planned due to a clash with the 2018 FIFA World Cup. The full route was announced on 17 October 2017; it was almost completely within France, with short deviations into Spain in the Pyrenees the only exceptions. Two of the Tour's most historic climbs featured, Alpe d'Huez and the Col du Tourmalet, which last featured in 2015 and 2016 respectively. Notable was stage nine's 21.7 km (13.5 mi) of sett paving, split across fifteen sectors, a feature that was last seen in the 2015 Tour. It finished in Roubaix, home of the "monument" race Paris–Roubaix. For the first time in 60 to 70 years, it included a section of unpaved roads on the Glières Plateau. Overall, the route was thought to offer something for all rider types.

Stage one began in the village of Noirmoutier-en-l'Île on the island of Noirmoutier, before heading along the coast of the Vendée department. The following two stages were loops, with the third taking the route north into the Maine-et-Loire department. The next three stages took place in the region of Brittany, ending with two laps of the short, but steep, climb in Mûr-de-Bretagne. The seventh, eighth and ninth stages headed north-east with finishes in Chartres, Amiens and Roubaix, respectively. A long transfer then moved the race to the Alps. Following three stages in the mountains, the Tour descended into the Drôme department and stage thirteen's finish in the city of Valence. The Massif Central highland region hosted stage fourteen, with the finish in Mende. The next two transitional stages took the race south-west to the Pyrenees across a continuous journey between Millau, Carcassonne and Bagnères-de-Luchon. After two Pyrenean stages, the eighteenth stage took place in the foothills between Trie-sur-Baïse to Pau. The next stage headed back into the mountains, before the penultimate stage, which took place close to the west coast in the French Basque Country. A long transfer took the Tour to its conclusion in Paris with the Champs-Élysées stage.

There were 21 stages in the race, covering a total distance of 3,351 km (2,082 mi), the shortest of the 21st century up to that point. There were two time trial events, stage three's 35.5 km (22 mi) team time trial and stage twenty's 31 km (19 mi) individual time trial. Of the remaining nineteen stages, eight were officially classified as flat, five as hilly and six as mountainous. The longest mass-start stage was stage seven, at 231 km (144 mi), and the shortest was stage seventeen, at 65 km (40 mi). The aforementioned, a mountain stage, was the shortest since 1996 and began with a standing start grid formation, with positions based on riders general classification ranking. The grid formation was an innovation for the Tour, and with shorter distance, was beforehand universally welcomed, but it was thought to have made little effect on the race. There were summit finishes on three stages, stage eleven to La Rosière, stage twelve to Alpe d'Huez, and stage seventeen to the Col de Portet. The highest point of elevation in the race was the 2,215 m (7,267 ft)-high Col de Portet Pyrenean pass, the first time it had been used in the Tour. It was among nine hors catégorie (English: "beyond category") rated climbs in the race. There were nine new stage start or finish locations. The rest days were after stage nine, in Annecy, and fifteen, in Carcassonne.

Stage characteristics and winners
| Stage | Date | Course | Distance | Stage type | Winner |
|---|---|---|---|---|---|
| 1 | 7 July | Noirmoutier-en-l'Île to Fontenay-le-Comte | 201 km (125 mi) | Flat stage | Fernando Gaviria (COL) |
| 2 | 8 July | Mouilleron-Saint-Germain to La Roche-sur-Yon | 182.5 km (113 mi) | Flat stage | Peter Sagan (SVK) |
| 3 | 9 July | Cholet to Cholet | 35.5 km (22 mi) | Team time trial | BMC Racing Team |
| 4 | 10 July | La Baule to Sarzeau | 195 km (121 mi) | Flat stage | Fernando Gaviria (COL) |
| 5 | 11 July | Lorient to Quimper | 204.5 km (127 mi) | Hilly stage | Peter Sagan (SVK) |
| 6 | 12 July | Brest to Mûr-de-Bretagne | 181 km (112 mi) | Hilly stage | Dan Martin (IRL) |
| 7 | 13 July | Fougères to Chartres | 231 km (144 mi) | Flat stage | Dylan Groenewegen (NED) |
| 8 | 14 July | Dreux to Amiens | 181 km (112 mi) | Flat stage | Dylan Groenewegen (NED) |
| 9 | 15 July | Arras to Roubaix | 156.5 km (97 mi) | Hilly stage | John Degenkolb (GER) |
| | 16 July | Annecy | | Rest day | |
| 10 | 17 July | Annecy to Le Grand-Bornand | 158.5 km (98 mi) | Mountain stage | Julian Alaphilippe (FRA) |
| 11 | 18 July | Albertville to La Rosière | 108.5 km (67 mi) | Mountain stage | Geraint Thomas (GBR) |
| 12 | 19 July | Bourg-Saint-Maurice to Alpe d'Huez | 175.5 km (109 mi) | Mountain stage | Geraint Thomas (GBR) |
| 13 | 20 July | Le Bourg-d'Oisans to Valence | 169.5 km (105 mi) | Flat stage | Peter Sagan (SVK) |
| 14 | 21 July | Saint-Paul-Trois-Châteaux to Mende | 188 km (117 mi) | Hilly stage | Omar Fraile (ESP) |
| 15 | 22 July | Millau to Carcassonne | 181.5 km (113 mi) | Hilly stage | Magnus Cort Nielsen (DEN) |
| | 23 July | Carcassonne | | Rest day | |
| 16 | 24 July | Carcassonne to Bagnères-de-Luchon | 218 km (135 mi) | Mountain stage | Julian Alaphilippe (FRA) |
| 17 | 25 July | Bagnères-de-Luchon to Saint-Lary-Soulan (Col de Portet) | 65 km (40 mi) | Mountain stage | Nairo Quintana (COL) |
| 18 | 26 July | Trie-sur-Baïse to Pau | 171 km (106 mi) | Flat | Arnaud Démare (FRA) |
| 19 | 27 July | Lourdes to Laruns | 200.5 km (125 mi) | Mountain stage | Primož Roglič (SLO) |
| 20 | 28 July | Saint-Pée-sur-Nivelle to Espelette | 31 km (19 mi) | Individual time trial | Tom Dumoulin (NED) |
| 21 | 29 July | Houilles to Paris (Champs-Élysées) | 116 km (72 mi) | Flat stage | Alexander Kristoff (NOR) |
| | Total | | 3,351 km (2,082 mi) | | |

== Race overview ==
=== First week: Northern stages ===
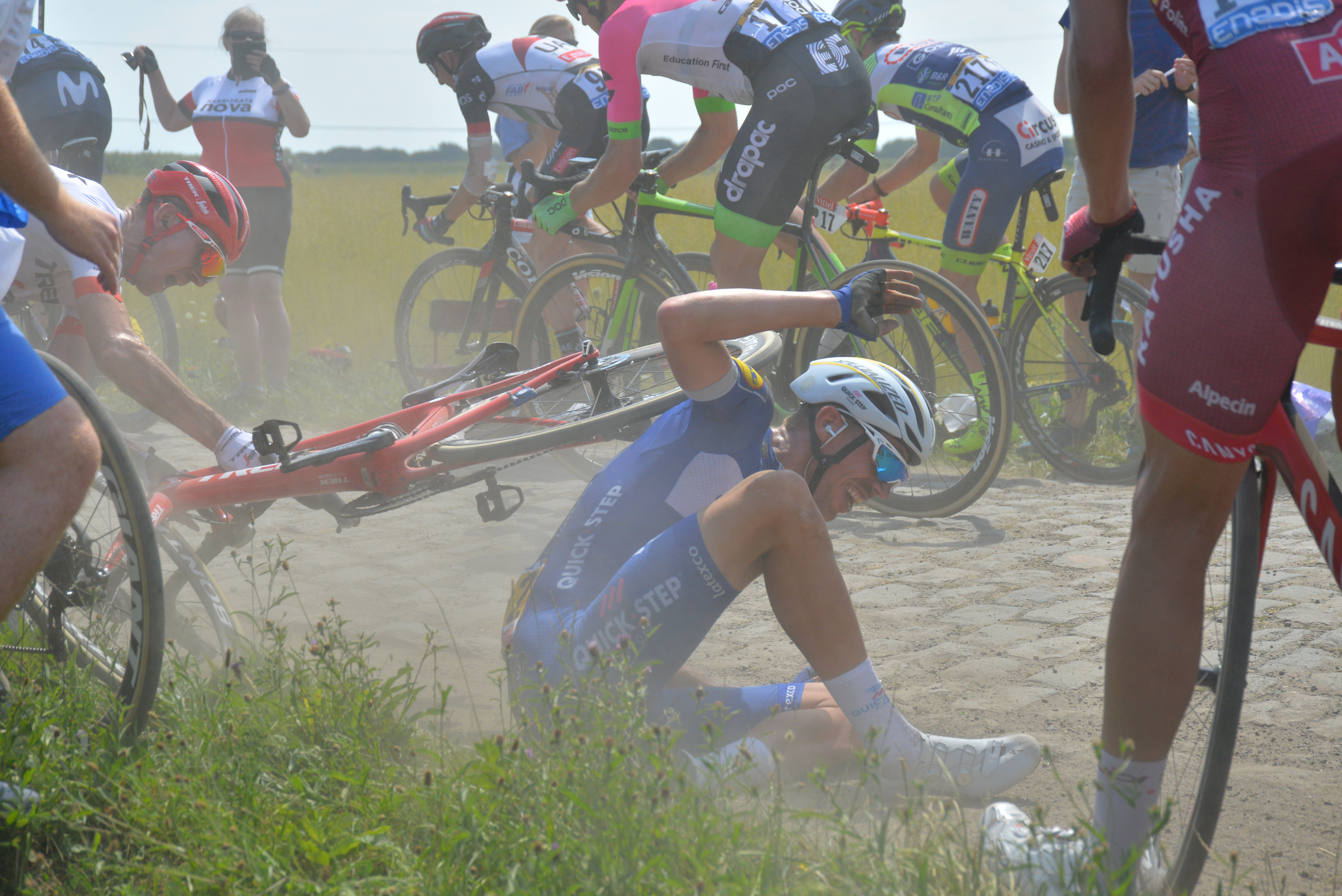
Tim Declercq (Quick-Step Floors) was one of the many riders that fell on the sett-paving sections of stage nine.

Stage one's bunch sprint was won by Fernando Gaviria, with Peter Sagan coming in second place and Marcel Kittel in third. Gaviria took the yellow and green jerseys as the leader of the general and points classifications respectively. Breakaway rider Kévin Ledanois (Fortuneo–Samsic) collected the most mountains classification points to take the first polka dot jersey as the leader of the classification. Sagan won stage two from a sprint to take the yellow and green jerseys, with Dion Smith of Wanty–Groupe Gobert claiming the lead in the mountains classification. Stage three's team time trial was won by BMC Racing Team whose riders Tejay van Garderen and Greg Van Avermaet became tied for the overall lead, with Van Avermaet moving into yellow for the second time in his career due to him crossing the finish line ahead of Van Garderen in the first two stages being as there was not yet an individual time trial to measure their times down to the 1000th of a second. Stage four was won by Gaviria from a bunch sprint. Sagan further extended his lead in the points competition by winning stage five's uphill sprint finish in Quimper. Also in stage five, Toms Skujiņš of Trek–Segafredo won the mountains points which gave him the polka dot jersey, becoming the first from Latvia to ever lead the mountains classification.

In stage six, which ended atop the Mûr-de-Bretagne climb, Dan Martin attacked with a kilometre remaining and was able to stay away take the victory one second ahead of a large group that the contained the general classification contenders. In the closing kilometres of the stage, Geraint Thomas won a three-second time bonus sprint that brought him to three seconds behind Van Avermaet in the general classification. Overall favourites Romain Bardet and Tom Dumoulin lost time as their tyres punctured late in the stage. The seventh stage was won by Dylan Groenewegen from a bunch sprint. There were multiple crashes in the first week of the Tour with six riders abandoning the race for various reasons, including the 2017 Tour points classification winner Michael Matthews. Groenewegen won a further bunch sprint in the eighth stage. In the sprint, André Greipel and Gaviria were penalised for headbutting each other and lost their stage placing and green jersey points. Stage nine's sett-paving sections caused many issues for the riders, including leading sprinters and two of the classification contenders. Richie Porte abandoned for the second year in a row after crashing in the opening 10 km (6.2 mi). Rigoberto Urán initially tried to continue the race despite injuries sustained during a crash, but was forced to quit the race on the following stage. Chris Froome, his teammate Egan Bernal, Jakob Fuglsang, and Mikel Landa, crashed in the stage along with many other riders; numerous riders had tyre punctures as well, including three for Bardet. His teammate Alexis Vuillermoz was forced to abandon the stage after colliding with a spectator taking photographs. Meanwhile, Yves Lampaert (Quick-Step Floors), John Degenkolb, and Van Avermaet were able escape the remaining riders from the peloton (main group) and together they contested a sprint finish, which was won by Degenkolb. Van Avermaet gained time, as well winning the time bonus sprint, to extend his lead in the general classification. The following day was the Tour's first rest day.

=== Second week: Alps and transition west ===
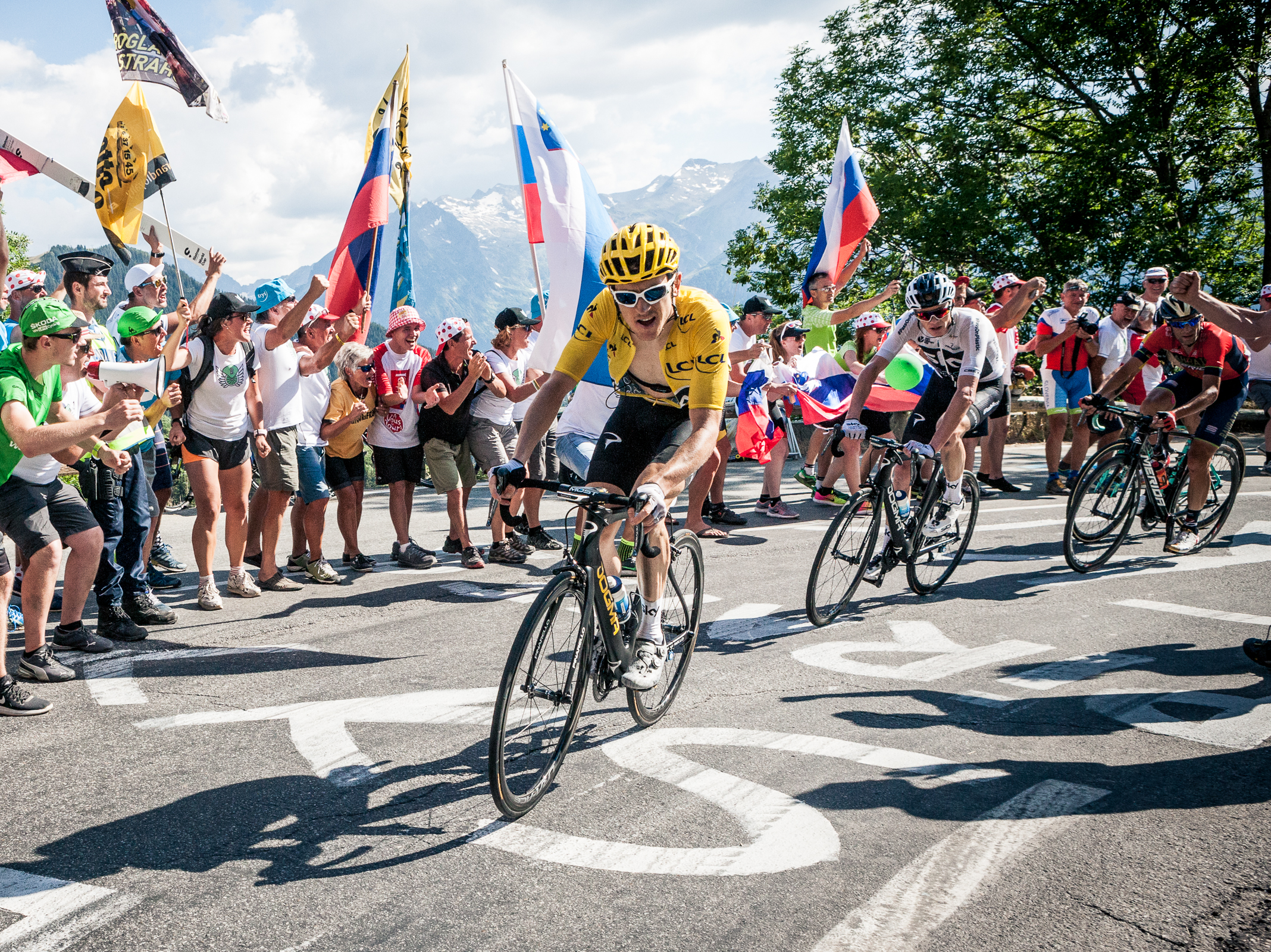
Geraint Thomas during stage twelve's climb of Alpe d'Huez, wearing the general classification leader's yellow jersey, on his way to winning a second stage in a row

The first stage in the high mountains and first in the Alps, the tenth, was won by Quick-Step Floors rider Julian Alaphilippe, who attacked on his own with 30 km (18.6 mi) to go from a large breakaway group that included race leader Van Avermaet. The aforementioned retained the yellow jersey and extended his lead to 2 min 22 s, when pundits predicted the first day in the Alps would be his last as overall race leader. Alaphilippe also took lead of the mountains classification. Thomas achieved back-to-back wins both from the group of overall contenders on stages eleven and twelve by pushing the breakaway riders until the very end. In the steep summit finish of the eleventh, Thomas attacked in the final 1 kilometre (0.6 miles), passing lone breakaway rider Mikel Nieve (Mitchelton–Scott) and managed to distance himself from Froome and Dumoulin by twenty seconds to take the win. On the twelfth stage, which was the final day in the Alps, Thomas won the sprint on the flat finish after the climb to Alpe d'Huez. LottoNL–Jumbo's Steven Kruijswijk was caught by the group of overall contenders in the final kilometres after he had launched a solo attack with 70 km (43.5 mi) remaining. Following the stage, the general classification top three was: Thomas in first position, Froome second, 1 min 39 s down, and Dumoulin third, a further 11 seconds behind. General classification contender Vincenzo Nibali, who was fourth overall, was forced to withdraw from the Tour following the stage after an incident near the summit of Alpe d'huez where he fell off his bike fracturing a vertebra taking Roglič down with him. It was initially suspected that the crash had been caused by a police motorcycle driving in front of him, but it later emerged that he became caught in a spectator's camera strap. Nibali's team management saw the lack of crowd control from the police and spectators lighting flares as contributing factors. Following the incident, Christian Prudhomme appealed to fans to show the riders more respect. Many riders left the Tour during the Alpine stages, either being forced to abandon due to fatigue and injury, or were disqualified for finishing outside the cut-off time; (Note: Riders were required to finish stages within a set time based on the stage winner's time and the difficulty coefficient of the stage. Reasons for exceptions to this rule could have been the average stage speed, the occurrence of an incident or accident, and impassable roads.) riders of note were the sprinters Mark Cavendish, Gaviria, Greipel, Groenewegen, and Kittel.

Sagan won stage thirteen with a surprise attack in the closing meters of the bunch sprint finish, while Alexander Kristoff and Arnaud Démare were together sprinting for the finish line. In stage fourteen, Omar Fraile of Astana launched a late move from the large breakaway after the final climb to win at the Mende aerodrome; the breakaway finished eighteen minutes ahead of the peloton. Stage fifteen, the start of the final week, was once again a breakaway victory, with Magnus Cort taking Astana's second win in two days. The next day was the second rest day of the race. Following the stage, controversy arose around Team Sky rider Gianni Moscon, who had allegedly punched Fortune-Samsic rider Élie Gesbert during the opening part of the stage. After reviewing footage of the incident, the race jury disqualified him for 'particularly serious aggression'. A non-racing incident occurred during the sixteenth stage when hay bales were placed across the road by local farmers protesting about reductions to their subsidies. The police used tear gas to disperse them, and as the riders rode past this area, there was still gas in the air. The race was subsequently neutralized for about fifteen minutes because several riders had problems with their eyes and had to rinse them. After the restart, a large breakaway escaped, and Philippe Gilbert (Quick-Step Floors), while in the lead on a descent, lost control of his bicycle and crashed into and over a wall. Later, Adam Yates, having taken the lead, also fell. Gilbert finished the stage and collected the most combative rider award, but would not start the following day. Yates carried on, but was overtaken by Alaphilippe, who took his second stage victory.

=== Third week: Pyrenees and finale in Paris ===
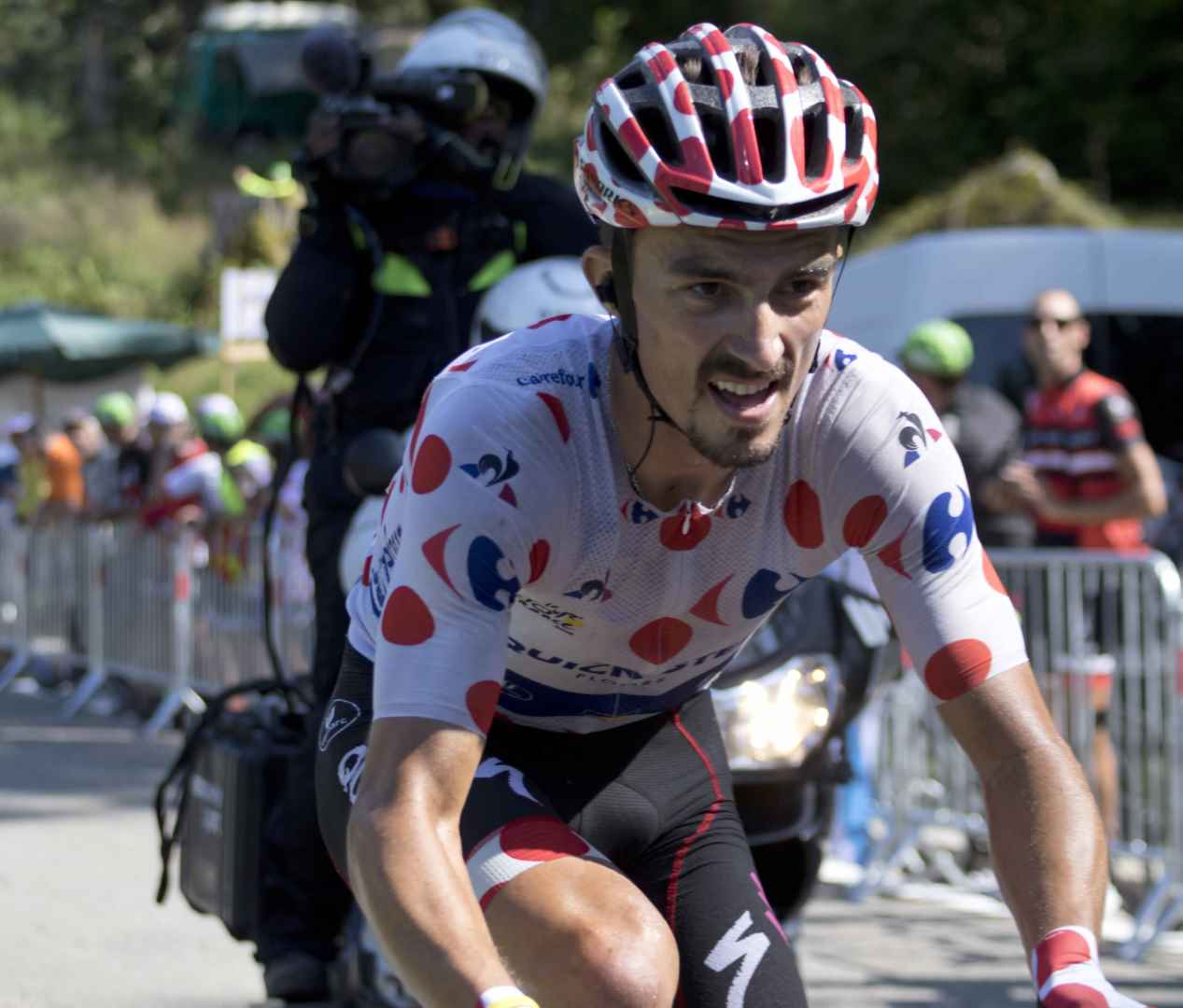
Julian Alaphilippe (pictured on stage 16) won the mountains classification's polka dot jersey, winning two of the six mountain stages.

The first of three stages in the Pyrenees, the seventeenth, opened with an uneventful grid formation, which saw the customary early formation of a breakaway group. Froome's challenge faded on the approach to the summit of the Col de Portet and he dropped to third position in the general classification, 2 min 31 s behind Thomas. Dumoulin moved into second place, 1 min 59 s off the lead. Nairo Quintana won the stage after attacking at the bottom of the final climb, moving himself up to fifth overall, behind Primož Roglič. The flat stage eighteen was won by Démare from a bunch sprint. By this point of the Tour, most of the top sprinters had left, and Démare had come close to missing the time cut in the previous stage along with Sagan, who had crashed heavily and was suffering with injuries. On the mountainous stage nineteen, Roglič attacked on the descent following the final climb, to a misty Col d'Aubisque, and soloed to the finish line nineteen seconds ahead of the chasing small group of overall favourites. Roglič took third place from Froome. Thomas was able to consolidate his overall position by picking up six bonus seconds by winning the sprint for second place, thereby extending his lead over Dumoulin to 2 min 5 s. The penultimate stage's 31 km (19.3 mi) individual time trial was won by Dumoulin, who finished one second ahead of Froome. Froome in turn managed to retake third place from Roglič. Thomas came third after surviving a scare when his back wheel locked, but completed the stage successfully, finishing fourteen seconds behind Dumoulin, taking a lead of 1 min 51 s into the final stage.

The final stage in Paris was won by Kristoff in a bunch sprint on the Champs-Élysées. Thomas won the race with no changes in the final stage. Froome came third overall, 2 min 24 s down on Thomas. Sagan won the points classification with a total of 477, 231 ahead of Kristoff in second. Alaphilippe won the mountains classification with 169 points, with the 2017 winner and French compatriot Warren Barguil (Fortuneo–Samsic) second with 80 points. The best young rider was thirteenth-placed overall Pierre Latour (AG2R La Mondiale), with fifteenth-placed overall Bernal second. Movistar Team finished as the winners of the team classification, 12 min 33 s ahead of second-placed Team Sky. Of the 176 starters, 145 reached the finish of the last stage in Paris.

== Classification leadership and minor prizes ==
Four main individual classifications were contested in the 2018 Tour de France, as well as a team competition. The most important was the general classification, calculated by adding each rider's finishing times on each stage. Time bonuses (time subtracted) were awarded at the end of every stage apart from the time trial stages. The first three riders received 10, 6, and 4 seconds, respectively. Time bonuses of three, two and one seconds, were given to the first three riders to cross a "bonus point" in each of the first nine mass-start stages of the race. It would affect the general, but not the points classification. For crashes within the final 3 km (1.9 mi) of a stage, not including time trials and summit finishes, any rider involved received the same time as the group he was in when the crash occurred. The rider with the lowest cumulative time was the winner of the general classification and was considered to be the overall winner of the Tour. The rider leading the classification wore a yellow jersey.

Points classification points for the top 15 positions by type
| Type | 1 | 2 | 3 | 4 | 5 | 6 | 7 | 8 | 9 | 10 | 11 | 12 | 13 | 14 | 15 |
|---|---|---|---|---|---|---|---|---|---|---|---|---|---|---|---|
| Flat stage | 50 | 30 | 20 | 18 | 16 | 14 | 12 | 10 | 8 | 7 | 6 | 5 | 4 | 3 | 2 |
| Hilly stage | 30 | 25 | 22 | 19 | 17 | 15 | 13 | 11 | 9 | 7 | 6 | 5 | 4 | 3 | 2 |
| Mountain stage | 20 | 17 | 15 | 13 | 11 | 10 | 9 | 8 | 7 | 6 | 5 | 4 | 3 | 2 | 1 |
| Individual time trial | 20 | 17 | 15 | 13 | 11 | 10 | 9 | 8 | 7 | 6 | 5 | 4 | 3 | 2 | 1 |
| Intermediate sprint | 20 | 17 | 15 | 13 | 11 | 10 | 9 | 8 | 7 | 6 | 5 | 4 | 3 | 2 | 1 |

The second classification was the points classification. Riders received points for finishing among the highest placed in a stage finish, or in intermediate sprints during the stage. The points available for each stage finish were determined by the stage's type. The leader was identified by a green jersey.

The third classification was the mountains classification. Points were awarded to the riders that reached the summit of the most difficult climbs first. The climbs were categorised, in order of increasing difficulty, as fourth-, third-, second-, and first-category and hors catégorie. Double points were awarded at the top of the last mountains in the three mountain stages in the three Pyreneean stages (the Col du Portillon, the Col de Portet and the Col d'Aubisque). The leader wore a white jersey with red polka dots.

The final individual classification was the young rider classification. This was calculated the same way as the general classification, but was restricted to riders born on or after 1 January 1993. The leader wore a white jersey.

The final classification was a team classification. This was calculated using the finishing times of the best three riders per team on each stage; the leading team was the team with the lowest cumulative time. The number of stage victories and placings per team determined the outcome of a tie. The riders on the team that lead this classification are identified with yellow number bibs on the back of their jerseys and yellow helmets.

In addition, there was a combativity award given after each stage to the rider considered, by a jury, to have "made the greatest effort and who demonstrated the best qualities of sportsmanship". No combativity awards were given for the time trials and the final stage. The winner wore a red number bib the following stage. At the conclusion of the Tour, Dan Martin won the overall super-combativity award which was, again, awarded by a jury.

A total of €2,287,750 was awarded in cash prizes in the race. The overall winner of the general classification received €500,000, with the second and third placed riders getting €200,000 and €100,000 respectively. All finishers in the top 160 were awarded money. The holders of the classifications benefited on each stage they led; the final winners of the points and mountains were given €25,000, while the best young rider and most combative rider got €20,000. The team classification winners were given €50,000. €11,000 was given to the winners of each stage of the race, with smaller amounts given to places 2–20. There were also two special awards each with a prize of €5000. The Souvenir Henri Desgrange, given to first rider to pass the summit of the highest climb in the Tour, the Col du Portet on stage seventeen, and the Souvenir Jacques Goddet, given to the first rider to pass Goddet's memorial at the summit of the Col du Tourmalet in stage nineteen. Nairo Quintana won the Henri Desgrange and Julian Alaphilippe won the Jacques Goddet.

Classification leadership by stage
| Stage | Winner | General classification | Points classification | Mountains classification | Young rider classification | Team classification | Combativity award |
|---|---|---|---|---|---|---|---|
| 1 | Fernando Gaviria | Fernando Gaviria | Fernando Gaviria | Kévin Ledanois | Fernando Gaviria | Quick-Step Floors | Yoann Offredo |
| 2 | Peter Sagan | Peter Sagan | Peter Sagan | Dion Smith | Fernando Gaviria | Quick-Step Floors | Sylvain Chavanel |
| 3 | BMC Racing Team | Greg Van Avermaet | Peter Sagan | Dion Smith | Søren Kragh Andersen | Quick-Step Floors | no award |
| 4 | Fernando Gaviria | Greg Van Avermaet | Peter Sagan | Dion Smith | Søren Kragh Andersen | Quick-Step Floors | Jérôme Cousin |
| 5 | Peter Sagan | Greg Van Avermaet | Peter Sagan | Toms Skujiņš | Søren Kragh Andersen | Quick-Step Floors | Toms Skujiņš |
| 6 | Daniel Martin | Greg Van Avermaet | Peter Sagan | Toms Skujiņš | Søren Kragh Andersen | Quick-Step Floors | Damien Gaudin |
| 7 | Dylan Groenewegen | Greg Van Avermaet | Peter Sagan | Toms Skujiņš | Søren Kragh Andersen | Quick-Step Floors | Laurent Pichon |
| 8 | Dylan Groenewegen | Greg Van Avermaet | Peter Sagan | Toms Skujiņš | Søren Kragh Andersen | Quick-Step Floors | Fabien Grellier |
| 9 | John Degenkolb | Greg Van Avermaet | Peter Sagan | Toms Skujiņš | Søren Kragh Andersen | Quick-Step Floors | Damien Gaudin |
| 10 | Julian Alaphilippe | Greg Van Avermaet | Peter Sagan | Julian Alaphilippe | Pierre Latour | Movistar Team | Greg Van Avermaet |
| 11 | Geraint Thomas | Geraint Thomas | Peter Sagan | Julian Alaphilippe | Pierre Latour | Movistar Team | Alejandro Valverde |
| 12 | Geraint Thomas | Geraint Thomas | Peter Sagan | Julian Alaphilippe | Pierre Latour | Movistar Team | Steven Kruijswijk |
| 13 | Peter Sagan | Geraint Thomas | Peter Sagan | Julian Alaphilippe | Pierre Latour | Movistar Team | Michael Schär |
| 14 | Omar Fraile | Geraint Thomas | Peter Sagan | Julian Alaphilippe | Pierre Latour | Movistar Team | Jasper Stuyven |
| 15 | Magnus Cort Nielsen | Geraint Thomas | Peter Sagan | Julian Alaphilippe | Pierre Latour | Movistar Team | Rafał Majka |
| 16 | Julian Alaphilippe | Geraint Thomas | Peter Sagan | Julian Alaphilippe | Pierre Latour | Bahrain–Merida | Philippe Gilbert |
| 17 | Nairo Quintana | Geraint Thomas | Peter Sagan | Julian Alaphilippe | Pierre Latour | Movistar Team | Tanel Kangert |
| 18 | Arnaud Démare | Geraint Thomas | Peter Sagan | Julian Alaphilippe | Pierre Latour | Movistar Team | Luke Durbridge |
| 19 | Primož Roglič | Geraint Thomas | Peter Sagan | Julian Alaphilippe | Pierre Latour | Movistar Team | Mikel Landa |
| 20 | Tom Dumoulin | Geraint Thomas | Peter Sagan | Julian Alaphilippe | Pierre Latour | Movistar Team | no award |
| 21 | Alexander Kristoff | Geraint Thomas | Peter Sagan | Julian Alaphilippe | Pierre Latour | Movistar Team | no award |
| Final | | Geraint Thomas | Peter Sagan | Julian Alaphilippe | Pierre Latour | Movistar Team | Dan Martin |

- On stage two, Marcel Kittel, who was third in the points classification, wore the green jersey, because first placed Fernando Gaviria wore the yellow jersey as leader of the general classification and Peter Sagan, who was second in the points classification, wore the rainbow jersey of the world champion.
- On stage two, Dylan Groenewegen, who was second in the best young rider classification, wore the white jersey, because first placed Fernando Gaviria wore the yellow jersey as leader of the general classification.
- On stage three, Alexander Kristoff, who was third in the points classification, wore the green jersey, because first placed Peter Sagan wore the yellow jersey as leader of the general classification, and second placed Fernando Gaviria wore the white jersey as leader of the young rider classification.
- On stage seventeen Philippe Gilbert did not start, so no rider wore the red bib as the most combative rider of previous stage.

== Final standings ==
Legend
| A yellow jersey. | Denotes the winner of the general classification | A white jersey with red polka dots. | Denotes the winner of the mountains classification |
| A green jersey. | Denotes the winner of the points classification | A white jersey. | Denotes the winner of the young rider classification |
| A white jersey with a yellow number bib. | Denotes the winner of the team classification | A white jersey with a red number bib. | Denotes the winner of the combativity award |

=== General classification ===
Final general classification (1–10)
| Rank | Rider | Team | Time |
|---|---|---|---|
| 1 | Geraint Thomas (GBR) | Team Sky | 83h 17' 13" |
| 2 | Tom Dumoulin (NED) | Team Sunweb | + 1' 51" |
| 3 | Chris Froome (GBR) | Team Sky | + 2' 24" |
| 4 | Primož Roglič (SVN) | LottoNL–Jumbo | + 3' 22" |
| 5 | Steven Kruijswijk (NED) | LottoNL–Jumbo | + 6' 08" |
| 6 | Romain Bardet (FRA) | AG2R La Mondiale | + 6' 57" |
| 7 | Mikel Landa (ESP) | Movistar Team | + 7' 37" |
| 8 | Dan Martin (IRL) | UAE Team Emirates | + 9' 05" |
| 9 | Ilnur Zakarin (RUS) | Team Katusha–Alpecin | + 12' 37" |
| 10 | Nairo Quintana (COL) | Movistar Team | + 14' 18" |

Final general classification (11–145)
| Rank | Rider | Team | Time |
|---|---|---|---|
| 11 | Bob Jungels (LUX) | Quick-Step Floors | + 16' 32" |
| 12 | Jakob Fuglsang (DEN) | Astana | + 19' 46" |
| 13 | Pierre Latour (FRA) | AG2R La Mondiale | + 22' 13" |
| 14 | Alejandro Valverde (ESP) | Movistar Team | + 27' 26" |
| 15 | Egan Bernal (COL) | Team Sky | + 27' 52" |
| 16 | Tanel Kangert (EST) | Astana | + 34' 52" |
| 17 | Warren Barguil (FRA) | Fortuneo–Samsic | + 37' 06" |
| 18 | Domenico Pozzovivo (ITA) | Bahrain–Merida | + 39' 08" |
| 19 | Rafał Majka (POL) | Bora–Hansgrohe | + 39' 57" |
| 20 | Damiano Caruso (ITA) | BMC Racing Team | + 42' 31" |
| 21 | Guillaume Martin (FRA) | Wanty–Groupe Gobert | + 44' 39" |
| 22 | Ion Izagirre (ESP) | Bahrain–Merida | + 46' 36" |
| 23 | Mikel Nieve (ESP) | Mitchelton–Scott | + 49' 19" |
| 24 | Gorka Izagirre (ESP) | Bahrain–Merida | + 50' 02" |
| 25 | Simon Geschke (GER) | Team Sunweb | + 50' 15" |
| 26 | Bauke Mollema (NED) | Trek–Segafredo | + 1h 06' 33" |
| 27 | Pierre Rolland (FRA) | EF Education First–Drapac p/b Cannondale | + 1h 09' 09" |
| 28 | Greg Van Avermaet (BEL) | BMC Racing Team | + 1h 10' 14" |
| 29 | Adam Yates (GBR) | Mitchelton–Scott | + 1h 17' 35" |
| 30 | Lilian Calmejane (FRA) | Direct Énergie | + 1h 18' 09" |
| 31 | Robert Gesink (NED) | LottoNL–Jumbo | + 1h 21' 13" |
| 32 | Tejay van Garderen (USA) | BMC Racing Team | + 1h 23' 05" |
| 33 | Julian Alaphilippe (FRA) | Quick-Step Floors | + 1h 28' 08" |
| 34 | David Gaudu (FRA) | Groupama–FDJ | + 1h 30' 01" |
| 35 | Julien Bernard (FRA) | Trek–Segafredo | + 1h 34' 12" |
| 36 | Daniel Martínez (COL) | EF Education First–Drapac p/b Cannondale | + 1h 38' 38" |
| 37 | Antwan Tolhoek (NED) | LottoNL–Jumbo | + 1h 39' 01" |
| 38 | Rudy Molard (FRA) | Groupama–FDJ | + 1h 47' 36" |
| 39 | Sylvain Chavanel (FRA) | Direct Énergie | + 1h 47' 47" |
| 40 | Kristijan Đurasek (CRO) | UAE Team Emirates | + 1h 48' 06" |
| 41 | Arthur Vichot (FRA) | Groupama–FDJ | + 1h 51' 19" |
| 42 | Maxime Bouet (FRA) | Fortuneo–Samsic | + 1h 58' 08" |
| 43 | Nicolas Edet (FRA) | Cofidis | + 1h 58' 54" |
| 44 | Michael Valgren (DEN) | Astana | + 1h 59' 20" |
| 45 | Daniel Navarro (ESP) | Cofidis | + 2h 00' 32" |
| 46 | Daryl Impey (RSA) | Mitchelton–Scott | + 2h 00' 53" |
| 47 | Jesús Herrada (ESP) | Cofidis | + 2h 01' 52" |
| 48 | Amaël Moinard (FRA) | Fortuneo–Samsic | + 2h 03' 20" |
| 49 | Michał Kwiatkowski (POL) | Team Sky | + 2h 05' 29" |
| 50 | Andrey Amador (CRC) | Movistar Team | + 2h 05' 38" |
| 51 | Laurens ten Dam (NED) | Team Sunweb | + 2h 06' 22" |
| 52 | Søren Kragh Andersen (DEN) | Team Sunweb | + 2h 06' 23" |
| 53 | Stefan Küng (SUI) | BMC Racing Team | + 2h 07' 14" |
| 54 | Thomas Degand (BEL) | Wanty–Groupe Gobert | + 2h 09' 54" |
| 55 | Mathias Frank (SUI) | AG2R La Mondiale | + 2h 10' 29" |
| 56 | Jesper Hansen (DEN) | Astana | + 2h 10' 33" |
| 57 | Omar Fraile (ESP) | Astana | + 2h 10' 59" |
| 58 | Wout Poels (NED) | Team Sky | + 2h 13' 23" |
| 59 | Tom-Jelte Slagter (NED) | Team Dimension Data | + 2h 13' 58" |
| 60 | Franco Pellizotti (ITA) | Bahrain–Merida | + 2h 17' 32" |
| 61 | Pavel Kochetkov (RUS) | Team Katusha–Alpecin | + 2h 17' 52" |
| 62 | Marc Soler (ESP) | Movistar Team | + 2h 18' 51" |
| 63 | Jasper Stuyven (BEL) | Trek–Segafredo | + 2h 20' 24" |
| 64 | Marco Minnaard (NED) | Wanty–Groupe Gobert | + 2h 20' 31" |
| 65 | Thomas De Gendt (BEL) | Lotto–Soudal | + 2h 24' 41" |
| 66 | Oliver Naesen (BEL) | AG2R La Mondiale | + 2h 29' 36" |
| 67 | Nikias Arndt (GER) | Team Sunweb | + 2h 32' 02" |
| 68 | Magnus Cort (DEN) | Astana | + 2h 32' 26" |
| 69 | Darwin Atapuma (COL) | UAE Team Emirates | + 2h 35' 47" |
| 70 | Jonathan Castroviejo (ESP) | Team Sky | + 2h 36' 06" |
| 71 | Peter Sagan (SVK) | Bora–Hansgrohe | + 2h 38' 08" |
| 72 | Chad Haga (USA) | Team Sunweb | + 2h 39' 40" |
| 73 | Romain Sicard (FRA) | Direct Énergie | + 2h 42' 53" |
| 74 | Tobias Ludvigsson (SWE) | Groupama–FDJ | + 2h 45' 40" |
| 75 | Julien Vermote (BEL) | Team Dimension Data | + 2h 45' 57" |
| 76 | Gregor Mühlberger (AUT) | Bora–Hansgrohe | + 2h 46' 13" |
| 77 | Imanol Erviti (ESP) | Movistar Team | + 2h 47' 46" |
| 78 | Koen de Kort (NED) | Trek–Segafredo | + 2h 48' 29" |
| 79 | Ian Boswell (USA) | Team Katusha–Alpecin | + 2h 51' 47" |
| 80 | Yves Lampaert (BEL) | Quick-Step Floors | + 2h 52' 37" |
| 81 | Paul Martens (GER) | LottoNL–Jumbo | + 2h 52' 46" |
| 82 | Toms Skujiņš (LAT) | Trek–Segafredo | + 2h 53' 41" |
| 83 | Silvan Dillier (SUI) | AG2R La Mondiale | + 2h 55' 15" |
| 84 | Edvald Boasson Hagen (NOR) | Team Dimension Data | + 2h 57' 00" |
| 85 | Anthony Perez (FRA) | Cofidis | + 2h 58' 56" |
| 86 | Élie Gesbert (FRA) | Fortuneo–Samsic | + 3h 00' 48" |
| 87 | Nils Politt (GER) | Team Katusha–Alpecin | + 3h 00' 54" |
| 88 | Edward Theuns (BEL) | Team Sunweb | + 3h 02' 15" |
| 89 | Thomas Boudat (FRA) | Direct Énergie | + 3h 04' 07" |
| 90 | Michael Schär (SUI) | BMC Racing Team | + 3h 04' 14" |
| 91 | Yoann Offredo (FRA) | Wanty–Groupe Gobert | + 3h 04' 27" |
| 92 | Marcus Burghardt (GER) | Bora–Hansgrohe | + 3h 04' 48" |
| 93 | Jérôme Cousin (FRA) | Direct Énergie | + 3h 05' 34" |
| 94 | Paweł Poljański (POL) | Bora–Hansgrohe | + 3h 07' 14" |
| 95 | Andrea Pasqualon (ITA) | Wanty–Groupe Gobert | + 3h 09' 34" |
| 96 | Kévin Ledanois (FRA) | Fortuneo–Samsic | + 3h 11' 55" |
| 97 | Dion Smith (NZL) | Wanty–Groupe Gobert | + 3h 12' 24" |
| 98 | Laurent Pichon (FRA) | Fortuneo–Samsic | + 3h 12' 46" |
| 99 | Florian Vachon (FRA) | Fortuneo–Samsic | + 3h 13' 47" |
| 100 | Simon Clarke (AUS) | EF Education First–Drapac p/b Cannondale | + 3h 15' 40" |
| 101 | Julien Simon (FRA) | Cofidis | + 3h 15' 55" |
| 102 | Kristijan Koren (SLO) | Bahrain–Merida | + 3h 16' 54" |
| 103 | Tomasz Marczyński (POL) | Lotto–Soudal | + 3h 19' 10" |
| 104 | Daniele Bennati (ITA) | Movistar Team | + 3h 19' 22" |
| 105 | Romain Hardy (FRA) | Fortuneo–Samsic | + 3h 19' 49" |
| 106 | Rory Sutherland (AUS) | UAE Team Emirates | + 3h 21' 22" |
| 107 | Simon Gerrans (AUS) | BMC Racing Team | + 3h 21' 37" |
| 108 | Mathew Hayman (AUS) | Mitchelton–Scott | + 3h 21' 55" |
| 109 | Sonny Colbrelli (ITA) | Bahrain–Merida | + 3h 21' 55" |
| 110 | Reinardt Janse van Rensburg (RSA) | Team Dimension Data | + 3h 24' 25" |
| 111 | John Degenkolb (GER) | Trek–Segafredo | + 3h 26' 35" |
| 112 | Daniel Oss (ITA) | Bora–Hansgrohe | + 3h 32' 29" |
| 113 | Michael Gogl (AUT) | Trek–Segafredo | + 3h 32' 54" |
| 114 | Alexander Kristoff (NOR) | UAE Team Emirates | + 3h 33' 33" |
| 115 | Sep Vanmarcke (BEL) | EF Education First–Drapac p/b Cannondale | + 3h 34' 17" |
| 116 | Anthony Turgis (FRA) | Cofidis | + 3h 36' 11" |
| 117 | Michael Hepburn (AUS) | Mitchelton–Scott | + 3h 36' 30" |
| 118 | Luke Durbridge (AUS) | Mitchelton–Scott | + 3h 37' 21" |
| 119 | Niki Terpstra (NED) | Quick-Step Floors | + 3h 37' 31" |
| 120 | Fabien Grellier (FRA) | Direct Énergie | + 3h 37' 56" |
| 121 | Jack Bauer (NZL) | Mitchelton–Scott | + 3h 39' 02" |
| 122 | Maciej Bodnar (POL) | Bora–Hansgrohe | + 3h 39' 20" |
| 123 | Guillaume Van Keirsbulck (BEL) | Wanty–Groupe Gobert | + 3h 40' 30" |
| 124 | Christophe Laporte (FRA) | Cofidis | + 3h 41' 55" |
| 125 | Heinrich Haussler (AUS) | Bahrain–Merida | + 3h 42' 24" |
| 126 | Marco Marcato (ITA) | UAE Team Emirates | + 3h 42' 54" |
| 127 | Olivier Le Gac (FRA) | Groupama–FDJ | + 3h 49' 03" |
| 128 | Luke Rowe (GBR) | Team Sky | + 3h 50' 55" |
| 129 | Tom Scully (NZL) | EF Education First–Drapac p/b Cannondale | + 3h 50' 59" |
| 130 | Dimitri Claeys (BEL) | Cofidis | + 3h 51' 15" |
| 131 | Timothy Dupont (BEL) | Wanty–Groupe Gobert | + 3h 51' 16" |
| 132 | Lukas Pöstlberger (AUT) | Bora–Hansgrohe | + 3h 56' 53" |
| 133 | Oliviero Troia (ITA) | UAE Team Emirates | + 3h 57' 02" |
| 134 | Ramon Sinkeldam (NED) | Groupama–FDJ | + 3h 58' 01" |
| 135 | Maximiliano Richeze (ARG) | Quick-Step Floors | + 3h 58' 58" |
| 136 | Taylor Phinney (USA) | EF Education First–Drapac p/b Cannondale | + 3h 59' 07" |
| 137 | Timo Roosen (NED) | LottoNL–Jumbo | + 4h 01' 05" |
| 138 | Roberto Ferrari (ITA) | UAE Team Emirates | + 4h 01' 34" |
| 139 | Amund Grøndahl Jansen (NOR) | LottoNL–Jumbo | + 4h 02' 04" |
| 140 | Damien Gaudin (FRA) | Direct Énergie | + 4h 02' 07" |
| 141 | Arnaud Démare (FRA) | Groupama–FDJ | + 4h 08' 18" |
| 142 | Jasper De Buyst (BEL) | Lotto–Soudal | + 4h 08' 54" |
| 143 | Jay Thomson (RSA) | Team Dimension Data | + 4h 09' 49" |
| 144 | Jacopo Guarnieri (ITA) | Groupama–FDJ | + 4h 12' 29" |
| 145 | Lawson Craddock (USA) | EF Education First–Drapac p/b Cannondale | + 4h 34' 19" |

=== Points classification ===
Final points classification (1–10)
| Rank | Rider | Team | Points |
|---|---|---|---|
| 1 | Peter Sagan (SVK) | Bora–Hansgrohe | 477 |
| 2 | Alexander Kristoff (NOR) | UAE Team Emirates | 246 |
| 3 | Arnaud Démare (FRA) | Groupama–FDJ | 203 |
| 4 | John Degenkolb (GER) | Trek–Segafredo | 178 |
| 5 | Julian Alaphilippe (FRA) | Quick-Step Floors | 143 |
| 6 | Greg Van Avermaet (BEL) | BMC Racing Team | 134 |
| 7 | Andrea Pasqualon (ITA) | Wanty–Groupe Gobert | 115 |
| 8 | Geraint Thomas (GBR) | Team Sky | 110 |
| 9 | Sonny Colbrelli (ITA) | Bahrain–Merida | 104 |
| 10 | Dan Martin (IRL) | UAE Team Emirates | 98 |

=== Mountains classification ===
Final mountains classification (1–10)
| Rank | Rider | Team | Points |
|---|---|---|---|
| 1 | Julian Alaphilippe (FRA) | Quick-Step Floors | 170 |
| 2 | Warren Barguil (FRA) | Fortuneo–Samsic | 91 |
| 3 | Rafał Majka (POL) | Bora–Hansgrohe | 76 |
| 4 | Geraint Thomas (GBR) | Team Sky | 74 |
| 5 | Tom Dumoulin (NED) | Team Sunweb | 63 |
| 6 | Primož Roglič (SVN) | LottoNL–Jumbo | 56 |
| 7 | Dan Martin (IRL) | UAE Team Emirates | 41 |
| 8 | Nairo Quintana (COL) | Movistar Team | 40 |
| 9 | Tanel Kangert (EST) | Astana | 39 |
| 10 | Steven Kruijswijk (NED) | LottoNL–Jumbo | 36 |

=== Young rider classification ===
Final young rider classification (1–10)
| Rank | Rider | Team | Time |
|---|---|---|---|
| 1 | Pierre Latour (FRA) | AG2R La Mondiale | 83h 39' 26" |
| 2 | Egan Bernal (COL) | Team Sky | + 5' 39" |
| 3 | Guillaume Martin (FRA) | Wanty–Groupe Gobert | + 22' 05" |
| 4 | David Gaudu (FRA) | Groupama–FDJ | + 1h 07' 18" |
| 5 | Daniel Martínez (COL) | EF Education First–Drapac p/b Cannondale | + 1h 16' 01" |
| 6 | Antwan Tolhoek (NED) | LottoNL–Jumbo | + 1h 16' 48" |
| 7 | Søren Kragh Andersen (DEN) | Team Sunweb | + 1h 44' 10" |
| 8 | Stefan Küng (SUI) | BMC Racing Team | + 1h 45' 01" |
| 9 | Marc Soler (ESP) | Movistar Team | + 1h 56' 14" |
| 10 | Magnus Cort (DEN) | Astana | + 2h 10' 13" |

=== Team classification ===
Final team classification (1–10)
| Rank | Team | Time |
|---|---|---|
| 1 | (Spain) Movistar Team | 250h 24' 53" |
| 2 | Bahrain–Merida | + 12' 33" |
| 3 | (United Kingdom) Team Sky | + 31' 14" |
| 4 | (Netherlands) LottoNL–Jumbo | + 47' 24" |
| 5 | (Kazakhstan) Astana | + 1h 15' 32" |
| 6 | (Germany) Team Sunweb | + 1h 58' 54" |
| 7 | (France) AG2R La Mondiale | + 2h 15' 49" |
| 8 | (United States) BMC Racing Team | + 2h 35' 45" |
| 9 | (Belgium) Quick-Step Floors | + 3h 06' 17" |
| 10 | (Australia) Mitchelton–Scott | + 3h 13' 41" |

== UCI rankings ==
Riders from the WorldTeams competed individually and for their teams for points that contributed towards the World Tour rankings. Riders from both the WorldTeams and Professional Continental teams also competed individually and for their nations for points that contributed towards the UCI World Ranking, which included all UCI road races. Both rankings used the same points scale, awarding points to the top sixty in the general classification, each yellow jersey given at the end of a stage, the top five finishers in each stage and for the top three in the final points and mountains classifications. The points accrued by Thomas moved him from 20th to second in the World Tour individual ranking and from 41st to fourth in the individual World Ranking. Sagan kept his position at the top of both rankings, with Quick-Step Floors and Belgium also holding the lead of the World Tour team ranking and World Ranking nation ranking respectively.

UCI World Tour individual ranking on 29 July 2018 (1–10)
| Rank | Prev. | Name | Team | Points |
|---|---|---|---|---|
| 1 | 1 | Peter Sagan (SVK) | Bora–Hansgrohe | 2684.00 |
| 2 | 20 | Geraint Thomas (GBR) | Team Sky | 2534.25 |
| 3 | 10 | Chris Froome (GBR) | Team Sky | 1976.68 |
| 4 | 18 | Tom Dumoulin (NED) | Team Sunweb | 1975.62 |
| 5 | 9 | Primož Roglič (SVN) | LottoNL–Jumbo | 1921.00 |
| 6 | 2 | Alejandro Valverde (ESP) | Movistar Team | 1807.00 |
| 7 | 6 | Julian Alaphilippe (FRA) | Quick-Step Floors | 1761.12 |
| 8 | 4 | Elia Viviani (ITA) | Quick-Step Floors | 1647.00 |
| 9 | 11 | Romain Bardet (FRA) | AG2R La Mondiale | 1530.00 |
| 10 | 3 | Simon Yates (GBR) | Mitchelton–Scott | 1472.00 |

UCI World Ranking individual ranking on 29 July 2018 (1–10)
| Rank | Prev. | Name | Team | Points |
|---|---|---|---|---|
| 1 | 1 | Peter Sagan (SVK) | Bora–Hansgrohe | 4358.00 |
| 2 | 3 | Chris Froome (GBR) | Team Sky | 3939.68 |
| 3 | 2 | Elia Viviani (ITA) | Quick-Step Floors | 3746.00 |
| 4 | 41 | Geraint Thomas (GBR) | Team Sky | 2834.25 |
| 5 | 11 | Tom Dumoulin (NED) | Team Sunweb | 2828.19 |
| 6 | 4 | Alexander Kristoff (NOR) | UAE Team Emirates | 2706.00 |
| 7 | 9 | Julian Alaphilippe (FRA) | Quick-Step Floors | 2668.12 |
| 8 | 5 | Alejandro Valverde (ESP) | Movistar Team | 2631.00 |
| 9 | 8 | Greg Van Avermaet (BEL) | BMC Racing Team | 2623.47 |
| 10 | 6 | Tim Wellens (BEL) | Lotto–Soudal | 2458.00 |

== See also ==
- 2018 in men's road cycling
- 2018 in sports
- 2018 La Course by Le Tour de France

== Bibliography ==
- Augendre, Jacques (2018). Guide historique [Historical guide] (PDF) (in French). Paris: Amaury Sport Organisation. Archived (PDF) from the original on 18 July 2018.
- Race regulations (PDF). Paris: Amaury Sport Organisation. 2018. Archived (PDF) from the original on 2 July 2018.
- UCI cycling regulations (PDF). Part 2, road races. Aigle, Switzerland: Union Cycliste Internationale. 1 January 2018. Archived from the original (PDF) on 16 January 2018.
