= 2018 Tour of Oman =

UCI Asia Tour

Race details
- Dates: 13–18 February 2017
- Stages: 6
- Distance: 914.5 km (568.2 mi)
- Winning time: 22h 49' 50"

Results
Jersey awarded to the overall winner	Winner	Alexey Lutsenko (Kazakhstan)	(Astana)
	Second	Miguel Ángel López (Colombia)	(Astana)
	Third	Gorka Izagirre (Spain)	(Bahrain–Merida)
Jersey awarded to the points classification winner	Points	Nathan Haas (Australia)	(Team Katusha–Alpecin)
Jersey awarded to the young rider classification winner	Young rider	Miguel Ángel López (Colombia)	(Astana)
Jersey awarded to the combativity classification winner	Combativity	Loïc Chetout (France)	(Cofidis)
	Team	Astana	

The 2018 Tour of Oman was a road cycling stage race that took place between 13 and 18 February 2018 in Oman. It was the ninth edition of the Tour of Oman and was rated as a 2.HC race as part of the 2018 UCI Asia Tour. The previous year's winner, Ben Hermans, did not defend his title.

The race was won by Kazakh cyclist Alexey Lutsenko, as part of Astana.

== Teams ==
Eighteen teams were invited to take part in the race. These included nine UCI WorldTeams and nine UCI Professional Continental teams.

UCI WorldTeams

- Astana
- Bahrain–Merida
- BMC Racing Team
- Team Dimension Data
- Team Katusha–Alpecin
- Quick-Step Floors
- Team Sunweb
- Trek–Segafredo
- UAE Team Emirates

UCI Professional Continental Teams

- Aqua Blue Sport
- Caja Rural–Seguros RGA
- Cofidis
- Fortuneo–Samsic
- Rally Cycling
- Roompot–Nederlandse Loterij
- Sport Vlaanderen–Baloise
- Vital Concept
- Wanty–Groupe Gobert

== Route ==
Stage schedule
Stage	Date	Route	Distance	Type	Winner
1	13 February	Nizwa to Sultan Qaboos University	162.5 km (101 mi)	Flat stage	Bryan Coquard (FRA)
2	14 February	Sultan Qaboos University to Al Bustan	167.5 km (104 mi)	Hilly stage	Nathan Haas (AUS)
3	15 February	German University of Technology in Oman to Wadi Dayqah Dam	179.5 km (112 mi)	Hilly stage	Greg Van Avermaet (BEL)
4	16 February	Yiti to Ministry of Tourism	117.5 km (73 mi)	Hilly stage	Magnus Cort Nielsen (DEN)
5	17 February	Samail to Jabal Al Akhdhar	152 km (94 mi)	Medium-mountain stage	Miguel Ángel López (COL)
6	18 February	The Wave Muscat to Matrah Corniche	135.5 km (84 mi)	Flat stage	Alexander Kristoff (NOR)

== Final general classification ==
Final general classification
Rank	Rider	Team	Time
1	Alexey Lutsenko (KAZ)	Astana	22h 49' 50"
2	Miguel Ángel López (COL)	Astana	+ 11"
3	Gorka Izagirre (ESP)	Bahrain–Merida	+ 28"
4	Jesús Herrada (ESP)	Cofidis	+ 30"
5	Nathan Haas (AUS)	Team Katusha–Alpecin	+ 32"
6	Dries Devenyns (BEL)	Quick-Step Floors	+ 1' 05"
7	Daniel Navarro (ESP)	Cofidis	+ 1' 14"
8	Odd Christian Eiking (NOR)	Wanty–Groupe Gobert	+ 1' 24"
9	Merhawi Kudus (ERI)	Team Dimension Data	+ 1' 29"
10	Rui Costa (POR)	UAE Team Emirates	+ 1' 37"

== Classification leadership table ==
There were five principal classifications in the 2018 Tour of Oman.

The first and most important was the general classification; the winner of this was considered the overall winner of the race. It was calculated by adding together each rider's times on each stage, then applying bonuses. Bonuses were awarded for coming in the top three on a stage (10 seconds for the winner, 6 seconds for the second placed rider and 4 seconds for the rider in third) or at intermediate sprints (3 seconds, 2 seconds and 1 second for the top three riders). The rider in the lead of the general classification wore a red jersey.

The second competition was the points classification, calculated by awarding points for the top 10 riders at the finish of each stage (15 points to the winner down to 1 point for the rider in tenth place) and to the top three at intermediate sprints (3 points, 2 points and 1 point). The rider with the highest points total was the leader of the classification and wore a green jersey. The young rider classification was open to those born on or after 1 January 1992. The young rider ranked highest in the general classification was the leader of the young rider classification and wore a white jersey.

The combativity classification was based on points won at intermediate sprints and classified climbs along the route. Points were awarded to the top three riders across each sprint or climb (3 points, 2 points and 1 point). The rider with the most accumulated points was the leader of the classification and wore a white jersey with red and green polka dots. The final competition was the team classification. On each stage, each team was awarded a time based on the cumulative time of its top three riders; the times for each stage were then added together and the team with the lowest total time was the leader of the team classification.

Classification leadership by stage
Stage	Winner	General classification	Points classification	Young rider classification	Combativity classification	Team classification
1	Bryan Coquard	Bryan Coquard	Bryan Coquard	Maxime Farazijn	Maxime Farazijn	Team Katusha–Alpecin
2	Nathan Haas	Nathan Haas	Nathan Haas	Merhawi Kudus	Loïc Chetout	Astana
3	Greg Van Avermaet	Greg Van Avermaet	Greg Van Avermaet	Odd Christian Eiking	Loïc Chetout	Astana
4	Magnus Cort Nielsen	Greg Van Avermaet	Greg Van Avermaet	Miguel Ángel López	Loïc Chetout	Astana
5	Miguel Ángel López	Alexey Lutsenko	Greg Van Avermaet	Miguel Ángel López	Loïc Chetout	Astana
6	Alexander Kristoff	Alexey Lutsenko	Nathan Haas	Miguel Ángel López	Loïc Chetout	Astana
Final		Alexey Lutsenko	Nathan Haas	Miguel Ángel López	Loïc Chetout	Astana
