= Twan Castelijns =

Dutch bicycle racer

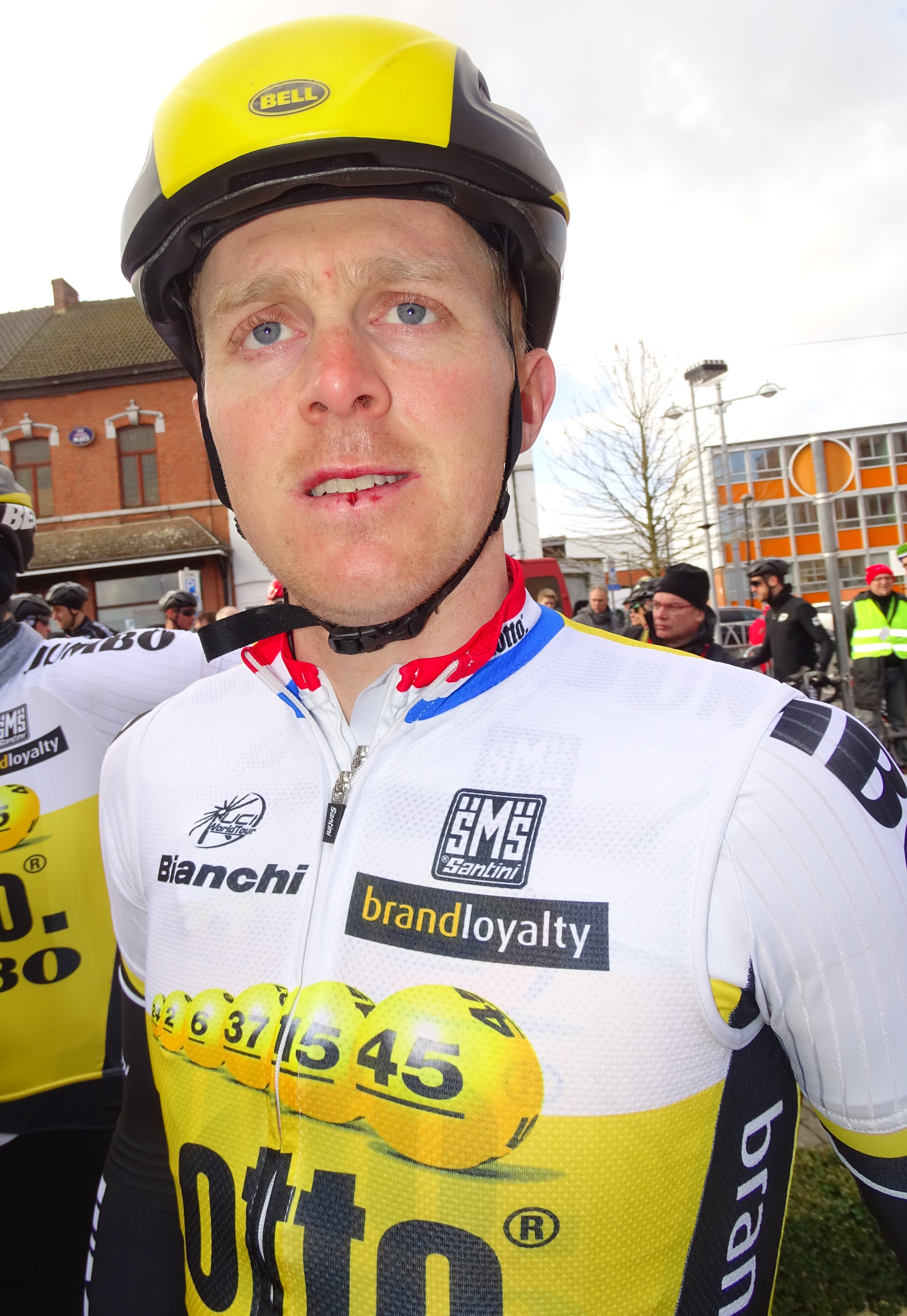
- Castelijns in 2016.

Personal information
- Full name: Twan Castelijns
- Born: 23 January 1989 (age 37) Hapert, North Brabant, Netherlands
- Height: 1.80 m (5 ft 11 in)
- Weight: 70 kg (154 lb)

Cycling career
- Sport: Cycling
- Discipline: Road
- Role: Rider

Amateur teams
- 2011: TWC Snelle Het Wiel
- 2012–2013: Baby-Dump–Lemmerns–Wilvo
- 2015: LottoNL–Jumbo (stagiaire)

Professional teams
- 2014: Koga Cycling Team
- 2015: Baby-Dump Cyclingteam
- 2016–2017: LottoNL–Jumbo

Twan Castelijns (born 23 January 1989 in Hapert, North Brabant, Netherlands) is a Dutch former cyclist, who rode professionally between 2014 and 2017 for the Koga Cycling Team, Baby-Dump Cyclingteam and LottoNL–Jumbo squads. During his career, he contested two Grand Tours; the 2016 Giro d'Italia, and the 2017 Giro d'Italia.

== Major results ==
2014
10th Grote Prijs Stad Zottegem
2015
3rd Arno Wallaard Memorial
5th Ster van Zwolle
6th Zuid Oost Drenthe Classic I
2017
2nd Ronde van Drenthe
6th Rund um Köln
7th Omloop Mandel-Leie-Schelde
8th Omloop Eurometropool
9th Dwars door West-Vlaanderen

=== Grand Tour general classification results timeline ===
Grand Tour	2016	2017
Giro d'Italia	114	130
Tour de France	—	—
Vuelta a España	—	—

Legend
—	Did not compete
DNF	Did not finish
