= Maxime Farazijn =

Belgian cyclist

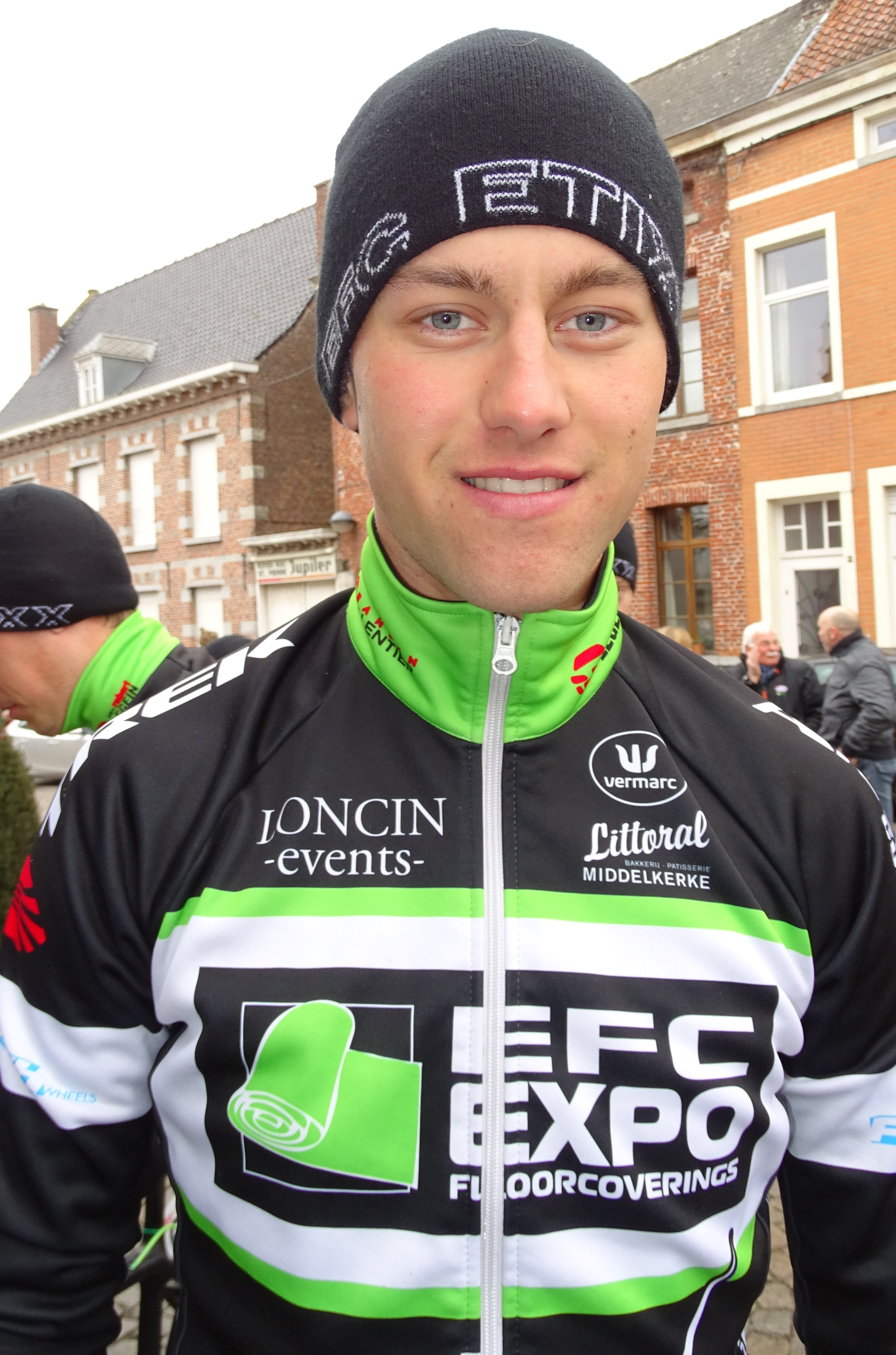
- Farazijn in 2015.

Personal information
- Full name: Maxime Farazijn
- Born: 2 June 1994 (age 32) Ypres, Belgium

Cycling career
- Sport: Cycling
- Current team: Wielerteam Decock–Van Eyck–Van Mosel Devos–Capoen
- Discipline: Road
- Role: Rider

Amateur teams
- 2009–2012: DJ–Matic Kortrijk
- 2013–2015: EFC–Omega Pharma–Quick-Step
- 2019: CC Villeneuve Saint-Germain
- 2020–2021: Dunkerque Grand Littoral–Cofidis
- 2022–: Wielerteam Decock–Van Eyck–Van Mosel Devos–Capoen

Professional team
- 2016–2018: Topsport Vlaanderen–Baloise

Maxime Farazijn (born 2 June 1994 in Ypres) is a Belgian cyclist, who currently rides for Belgian amateur team Wielerteam Decock–Van Eyck–Van Mosel Devos–Capoen. He is the son of former professional cyclist Peter Farazijn.

== Major results ==
2014
5th Grand Prix Criquielion
2015
1st Brussels–Opwijk
3rd Overall Le Triptyque des Monts et Châteaux

1st Stage 4

3rd Paris–Tours Espoirs
5th Paris–Roubaix Espoirs
6th Omloop Het Nieuwsblad Beloften
9th Kattekoers
2017
9th Ronde van Drenthe
2019
5th Grand Prix de la Somme
8th Overall Ronde de l'Oise
