= 2018 UCI America Tour =

Series of cycle races

- Thirteenth edition of the UCI America Tour

Details
- Dates: October 23, 2017–August 19, 2018
- Location: North America and South America
- Races: 2

The 2018 UCI America Tour is the fourteenth season of the UCI America Tour. The season began on October 23, 2017, with the Vuelta a Guatemala and ended on August 19, 2018.

The points leader, based on the cumulative results of previous races, wears the UCI America Tour cycling jersey. Throughout the season, points are awarded to the top finishers of stages within stage races and the final general classification standings of each of the stages races and one-day events. The quality and complexity of a race also determines how many points are awarded to the top finishers, the higher the UCI rating of a race, the more points are awarded.

The UCI ratings from highest to lowest are as follows:

- Multi-day events: 2.HC, 2.1 and 2.2
- One-day events: 1.HC, 1.1 and 1.2

== Events ==
=== 2017 ===
Date	Race name	Location	UCI Rating	Winner	Team	Ref
October 23 – November 1	Vuelta a Guatemala	Guatemala	2.2	Manuel Rodas (GUA)	Decorabaños	
October 27 – November 5	Vuelta Ciclista a Venezuela	Venezuela	2.2	Carlos Torres (VEN)	JHS Grupo	
December 18–27	Vuelta a Costa Rica	Costa Rica	2.2	Juan Carlos Rojas Villegas (CRC)	Extralum Frijoles Tierniticos	

=== 2018 ===
Date	Race name	Location	UCI Rating	Winner	Team	Ref
January 12–21	Vuelta al Táchira	Venezuela	2.2	Pedro Gutiérrez (VEN)	Gobierno de Yaracuy–Banco Bicentenario	
January 21–28	Vuelta a San Juan	Argentina	2.1	Gonzalo Najar (ARG)	Sindicato de Empleados Publicos de San Juan	
February 6–11	Colombia Oro y Paz	Colombia	2.1	Egan Bernal (COL)	Team Sky	
March 23 – April 1	Vuelta del Uruguay	Uruguay	2.2	Magno Nazaret (BRA)	Funvic/Soul Brasil Pro Cycling	
April 12–15	Joe Martin Stage Race	United States	2.2	Rubén Companioni (CUB)	Holowesko Citadel p/b Arapahoe Resources	
April 18–22	Tour of the Gila	United States	2.2	Rob Britton (CAN)	Rally Cycling	
May 28	Winston-Salem Cycling Classic	United States	1.1	Sam Bassetti (USA)	Elevate-KHS Pro Cycling	
June 13–17	Tour de Beauce	Canada	2.2	James Piccoli (CAN)	Elevate-KHS Pro Cycling	
July 6–15	Vuelta Ciclista a Venezuela	Venezuela	2.2	Matteo Spreafico (ITA)	Androni Giocattoli–Sidermec	
July 8	Delta Road Race	Canada	1.2	Adam De Vos (CAN)	Rally Cycling	
July 13	Chrono Kristin Armstrong	United States	1.2	Serghei Tvetcov (ROM)	UnitedHealthcare	
August 3–12	Tour de Guadeloupe	Guadeloupe	2.2	Boris Carène (FRA)	Carène Development	
August 6–12	Tour of Utah	United States	2.HC	Sepp Kuss (USA)	LottoNL–Jumbo	
August 16–19	Colorado Classic	United States	2.HC	Gavin Mannion (USA)	UnitedHealthcare	

== Final standings ==
The final standings were calculated based on the cumulative points accumulated across the entire 2017–2018 calendar circuit.
