= Tour of Guangxi =

Annual cycling race in Guangxi, China

Race details
- Date: October
- Region: Guangxi Zhuang Autonomous Region, China
- English name: GREE-Tour of Guangxi
- Local name: 格力·环广西公路自行车世界巡回赛 (in Chinese)
- Discipline: Road
- Competition: UCI World Tour; UCI Women's World Tour
- Type: Stage race (men); One-day race (women)
- Organiser: People's Government Of The Guangxi Zhuang Autonomous Region; Wanda Group
- Race director: Olivier Senn
- Web site: www.tourofguangxi.com.cn

History (men)
- First edition: 2017
- Editions: 7 (as of 2026)
- First winner: Tim Wellens (BEL)
- Most wins: No repeat winners
- Most recent: Jarno Widar (BEL)

History (women)
- First edition: 2017
- Editions: 6 (as of 2025)
- First winner: Maria Vittoria Sperotto (ITA)
- Most wins: No repeat winners
- Most recent: Anna Henderson (GBR)

The Tour of Guangxi (officially known as the GREE-Tour of Guangxi for sponsorship purposes) is an annual professional cycling race held in the Guangxi Zhuang Autonomous Region, China.

The men's race is a stage race and is part of the UCI World Tour. The women's race is a one-day race and is part of the UCI Women's World Tour. The event passes through a mix of metropolitan areas and countryside scenery.

First held in 2017, the men's race is the second UCI World Tour race to be held in China, following the Tour of Beijing which was held between 2011 and 2014. The women's race was first held in 2017, and joined the UCI Women's World Tour in 2018 - becoming the second event on the calendar held in China after Tour of Chongming Island.

== History ==
On 1 December 2016, the UCI, Wanda Sports (part of Wanda Group) and the regional government of Guangxi signed an agreement that would see a newly created stage race, the Tour of Guangxi, added to the UCI WorldTour from October 2017. Additionally, this agreement outlined that a women's Tour of Guangxi would be added to the calendar from 2017 and would apply for inclusion on the UCI Women's WorldTour from 2018. The UCI also announced that the UCI Cycling Gala would be held in the Chinese city of Guilin, having previously been hosted in Dubai, United Arab Emirates.

The inaugural men's race took place from 19 to 24 October 2017 and was the final event of the 2017 UCI World Tour. Stage 1 took place in and around Beihai. Subsequent stages passed through Qinzhou, Nanning and Liuzhou, traversing Guangxi from south to north. Guilin hosted Stage 6, the final stage of the tour. Tim Wellens finished first in the General Classification, beating runner-up Bauke Mollema by six seconds. Wellens had also won Stage 4, with Dylan Groenewegen winning Stage 5. Sprinter Fernando Gaviria won the three flat stages at the start of the tour, as well as the final stage. The inaugural women's race took place on 24 October 2017 and covered 110 km in and around Guilin. It was won by Maria Sperotto. Amy Cure and Lucy van der Haar also finished on the podium. The Tour of Guangxi was first part of the Women's WorldTour in 2018.

The race was due to occur in 2020, 2021 and 2022, but was cancelled as a result of the COVID-19 pandemic.

In the 2018, 2019 and 2023 editions of the tour, the race took a similar route as in 2017, travelling through Guangxi from Beihai on the south coast to Guilin in the north, with near-identical intermediate stage hosts. The 2024 route will instead start in Fangchenggang on the south coast, then travel north through the western part of Guangxi (through Chongzuo, Jingxi, Bama, Jinchengjiang and Yizhou) before turning south to conclude in the region's capital, and regular stage host, Nanning. Similarly, the first four editions of the women's race were hosted in Guilin; the 2024 edition will instead be hosted in Nanning.

In 2026, the women's edition was cancelled due to budget cuts from Gunagxi regional government, although the men's edition remain.

== Winners ==
=== General classification ===
Year	Country	Rider	Team
2017	Belgium	Tim Wellens	Lotto–Soudal
2018	Italy	Gianni Moscon	Team Sky
2019	Spain	Enric Mas	Deceuninck–Quick-Step
2020	No race due to COVID-19 pandemic		
2021	No race due to COVID-19 pandemic		
2022	No race due to COVID-19 pandemic		
2023	Netherlands	Milan Vader	Team Jumbo–Visma
2024	Belgium	Lennert Van Eetvelt	Lotto–Dstny
2025	Great Britain	Paul Double	Team Jayco–AlUla

=== Points classification ===
Year	Country	Rider	Team
2017	Colombia	Fernando Gaviria	Quick-Step Floors
2018	Netherlands	Fabio Jakobsen	Quick-Step Floors
2019	Germany	Pascal Ackermann	Bora–Hansgrohe
2020	No race due to COVID-19 pandemic		
2021	No race due to COVID-19 pandemic		
2022	No race due to COVID-19 pandemic		
2023	Belgium	Dries De Bondt	Alpecin–Deceuninck
2024	Great Britain	Ethan Vernon	Israel–Premier Tech
2025	France	Paul Magnier	Soudal–Quick-Step

=== Mountains classification ===
Year	Country	Rider	Team
2017	Italy	Daniel Oss	BMC Racing Team
2018	Switzerland	Silvan Dillier	AG2R La Mondiale
2019	Poland	Tomasz Marczyński	Lotto–Soudal
2020	No race due to COVID-19 pandemic		
2021	No race due to COVID-19 pandemic		
2022	No race due to COVID-19 pandemic		
2023	Denmark	Frederik Wandahl	Bora–Hansgrohe
2024	Netherlands	Pepijn Reinderink	Soudal–Quick-Step
2025	France	Simon Guglielmi	Arkéa–B&B Hotels

=== Youth classification ===
Year	Country	Rider	Team
2017	France	Julian Alaphilippe	Quick-Step Floors
2018	Italy	Gianni Moscon	Team Sky
2019	Spain	Enric Mas	Deceuninck–Quick-Step
2020	No race due to COVID-19 pandemic		
2021	No race due to COVID-19 pandemic		
2022	No race due to COVID-19 pandemic		
2023	Great Britain	Ethan Hayter	INEOS Grenadiers
2024	Belgium	Lennert Van Eetvelt	Lotto–Dstny
2025	Norway	Jørgen Nordhagen	Visma–Lease a Bike

=== Teams classification ===
Year	Team
2017	BMC Racing Team
2018	Astana
2019	Lotto–Soudal
2020	No race due to COVID-19 pandemic
2021	No race due to COVID-19 pandemic
2022	No race due to COVID-19 pandemic
2023	Cofidis
2024	UAE Team Emirates
2025	Visma–Lease a Bike

== Tour of Guangxi Women ==
First held in 2017 as the Tour of Guangxi Women's Elite World Challenge, the women's race joined the UCI Women's World Tour in 2018.

Year	Country	Rider	Team
2017	Italy	Maria Vittoria Sperotto	Bepink–Cogeas
2018	Cuba	Arlenis Sierra	Astana Women's Team
2019	Australia	Chloe Hosking	Alé–Cipollini
2020	No race due to COVID-19 pandemic		
2021	No race due to COVID-19 pandemic		
2022	No race due to COVID-19 pandemic		
2023	Poland	Daria Pikulik	Human Powered Health
2024	Spain	Sandra Alonso	Ceratizit–WNT Pro Cycling
2025	Great Britain	Anna Henderson	Lidl–Trek

The 2019 edition of the Tour of Guangxi Women's WorldTour took place on 22 October 2019 covered 145 km around Guilin.
