= 2024 UAE Tour =

Emirati cycling race

2024 UCI World Tour, race 3 of 35

Race details
- Dates: 19–25 February 2024
- Stages: 7
- Distance: 985.1 km (612.1 mi)
- Winning time: 22h 31' 18"

Results
Jersey awarded to the overall winner	Winner	Lennert Van Eetvelt (BEL)	(Lotto–Dstny)
	Second	Ben O'Connor (AUS)	(Decathlon–AG2R La Mondiale)
	Third	Pello Bilbao (ESP)	(Team Bahrain Victorious)
Jersey awarded to the points classification winner	Points	Tim Merlier (BEL)	(Soudal–Quick-Step)
Jersey awarded to the youth classification winner	Youth	Lennert Van Eetvelt (BEL)	(Lotto–Dstny)
Jersey awarded to the sprints classification winner	Sprints	Mark Stewart (GBR)	(Team Corratec–Vini Fantini)
	Team	(United States) Lidl–Trek	

The 2024 UAE Tour was a road cycling stage race that took place between 19 and 25 February in the United Arab Emirates. It was the sixth edition of the UAE Tour, and the third race of the 2024 UCI World Tour. The race was won by Belgian rider Lennert Van Eetvelt of Lotto-Dstny with a margin of victory of two seconds, after a late attack on the final mountain stage.

== Teams ==
Sixteen of eighteen UCI WorldTeams, and four UCI ProTeams participate in the race.

UCI WorldTeams

- Alpecin–Deceuninck
- Arkéa–B&B Hotels
- Astana Qazaqstan Team
- Bora–Hansgrohe
- Cofidis
- Decathlon–AG2R La Mondiale
- EF Education–EasyPost
- Groupama–FDJ
- Ineos Grenadiers
- Intermarché–Wanty
- Lidl–Trek
- Movistar Team
- Soudal–Quick-Step
- Team Bahrain Victorious
- Team dsm–firmenich PostNL
- Team Jayco–AlUla
- UAE Team Emirates
- Visma–Lease a Bike

UCI ProTeams

- Israel–Premier Tech
- Lotto–Dstny
- Team Corratec–Vini Fantini
- Tudor Pro Cycling Team

== Route ==
Stage characteristics and winners
Stage	Date	Course	Distance	Type	Stage winner
1	19 February	Al Dhafra Walk to Liwa Palace	143 km (89 mi)	Flat stage	Tim Merlier (BEL)
2	20 February	Hudayriat Island to Hudayriat Island	12.1 km (7.5 mi)	Individual time trial	Brandon McNulty (USA)
3	21 February	Al Marjan Island to Jebel Jais	176 km (109 mi)	Mountain stage	Ben O'Connor (AUS)
4	22 February	Dubai Police Officer's Club to Dubai Harbour	173 km (107 mi)	Flat stage	Tim Merlier (BEL)
5	23 February	Al Aqah to Umm Al Quwain	182 km (113 mi)	Flat stage	Olav Kooij (NED)
6	24 February	Louvre Abu Dhabi to Abu Dhabi Breakwater	138 km (86 mi)	Flat stage	Tim Merlier (BEL)
7	25 February	Al Ain to Jebel Hafeet	161 km (100 mi)	Mountain stage	Lennert Van Eetvelt (BEL)
Total			985.1 km (612.1 mi)		

== Stages ==
=== Stage 1 ===
19 February 2024 — Al Dhafra Walk to Liwa Palace, 143 km (89 mi)

Stage 1 Result
Rank	Rider	Team	Time
1	Tim Merlier (BEL)	Soudal–Quick-Step	3h 09' 55"
2	Arvid De Kleijn (NED)	Tudor Pro Cycling Team	+ 0"
3	Jakub Mareczko (ITA)	Team Corratec–Vini Fantini	+ 0"
4	Fabio Jakobsen (NED)	Team dsm–firmenich PostNL	+ 0"
5	Sam Welsford (AUS)	Bora–Hansgrohe	+ 0"
6	Fernando Gaviria (COL)	Movistar Team	+ 0"
7	Juan Sebastián Molano (COL)	UAE Team Emirates	+ 0"
8	Simone Consonni (ITA)	Lidl–Trek	+ 0"
9	Phil Bauhaus (GER)	Team Bahrain Victorious	+ 0"
10	Jarne Van de Paar (BEL)	Lotto–Dstny	+ 0"

General classification after Stage 1
Rank	Rider	Team	Time
1	Tim Merlier (BEL)	Soudal–Quick-Step	3h 09' 45"
2	Arvid De Kleijn (NED)	Tudor Pro Cycling Team	+ 4"
3	Mark Stewart (GBR)	Team Corratec–Vini Fantini	+ 4"
4	Jakub Mareczko (ITA)	Team Corratec–Vini Fantini	+ 6"
5	Marco Murgano (ITA)	Team Corratec–Vini Fantini	+ 6"
6	Pello Bilbao (ESP)	Team Bahrain Victorious	+ 9"
7	Loe van Belle (NED)	Visma–Lease a Bike	+ 9"
8	Fabio Jakobsen (NED)	Team dsm–firmenich PostNL	+ 10"
9	Sam Welsford (AUS)	Bora–Hansgrohe	+ 10"
10	Fernando Gaviria (COL)	Movistar Team	+ 10"

=== Stage 2 ===
20 February 2024 – Hudayriat Island to Hudayriat Island, 12.1 km (7.5 mi) (ITT)

Stage 2 Result
Rank	Rider	Team	Time
1	Brandon McNulty (USA)	UAE Team Emirates	13' 27"
2	Jay Vine (AUS)	UAE Team Emirates	+ 2"
3	Mikkel Bjerg (DEN)	UAE Team Emirates	+ 4"
4	Tobias Foss (NOR)	Ineos Grenadiers	+ 14"
5	Rainer Kepplinger (AUT)	Team Bahrain Victorious	+ 16"
6	Ilan Van Wilder (BEL)	Soudal–Quick-Step	+ 17"
7	Johan Price-Pejtersen (DEN)	Team Bahrain Victorious	+ 19"
8	Pello Bilbao (ESP)	Team Bahrain Victorious	+ 19"
9	Bruno Armirail (FRA)	Decathlon–AG2R La Mondiale	+ 20"
10	Iván Romeo (ESP)	Movistar Team	+ 21"

General classification after Stage 2
Rank	Rider	Team	Time
1	Brandon McNulty (USA)	UAE Team Emirates	3h 23' 22"
2	Jay Vine (AUS)	UAE Team Emirates	+ 2"
3	Mikkel Bjerg (DEN)	UAE Team Emirates	+ 4"
4	Tobias Foss (NOR)	Ineos Grenadiers	+ 14"
5	Rainer Kepplinger (AUT)	Team Bahrain Victorious	+ 16"
6	Ilan Van Wilder (BEL)	Soudal–Quick-Step	+ 17"
7	Pello Bilbao (ESP)	Team Bahrain Victorious	+ 18"
8	Johan Price-Pejtersen (DEN)	Team Bahrain Victorious	+ 19"
9	Bruno Armirail (FRA)	Decathlon–AG2R La Mondiale	+ 20"
10	Iván Romeo (ESP)	Movistar Team	+ 21"

=== Stage 3 ===
21 February 2024 – Al Marjan Island to Jebel Jais, 176 km (109 mi)

Stage 3 Result
Rank	Rider	Team	Time
1	Ben O'Connor (AUS)	Decathlon–AG2R La Mondiale	4h 16' 21"
2	Jay Vine (AUS)	UAE Team Emirates	+ 5"
3	Lennert Van Eetvelt (BEL)	Lotto–Dstny	+ 5"
4	Max Poole (GBR)	Team dsm–firmenich PostNL	+ 5"
5	Ilan Van Wilder (BEL)	Soudal–Quick-Step	+ 5"
6	Attila Valter (HUN)	Visma–Lease a Bike	+ 5"
7	Matthew Riccitello (USA)	Israel–Premier Tech	+ 5"
8	Pello Bilbao (ESP)	Team Bahrain Victorious	+ 5"
9	Einer Rubio (COL)	Movistar Team	+ 5"
10	Simon Carr (GBR)	EF Education–EasyPost	+ 5"

General classification after Stage 3
Rank	Rider	Team	Time
1	Jay Vine (AUS)	UAE Team Emirates	7h 39' 44"
2	Ben O'Connor (AUS)	Decathlon–AG2R La Mondiale	+ 11"
3	Brandon McNulty (USA)	UAE Team Emirates	+ 13"
4	Ilan Van Wilder (BEL)	Soudal–Quick-Step	+ 21"
5	Pello Bilbao (ESP)	Team Bahrain Victorious	+ 22"
6	Max Poole (GBR)	Team dsm–firmenich PostNL	+ 31"
7	Tobias Foss (NOR)	Ineos Grenadiers	+ 33"
8	Simon Carr (GBR)	EF Education–EasyPost	+ 36"
9	Mikkel Bjerg (DEN)	UAE Team Emirates	+ 37"
10	Attila Valter (HUN)	Visma–Lease a Bike	+ 39"

=== Stage 4 ===
22 February 2024 – Dubai Police Officer's Club to Dubai Harbour, 173 km (107 mi)

Stage 4 Result
Rank	Rider	Team	Time
1	Tim Merlier (BEL)	Soudal–Quick-Step	4h 01' 47"
2	Arvid de Kleijn (NED)	Tudor Pro Cycling Team	+ 0"
3	Olav Kooij (NED)	Visma–Lease a Bike	+ 0"
4	Stanisław Aniołkowski (POL)	Cofidis	+ 0"
5	Jakub Mareczko (ITA)	Team Corratec–Vini Fantini	+ 0"
6	Fabio Jakobsen (NED)	Team dsm–firmenich PostNL	+ 0"
7	Jarne Van de Paar (BEL)	Lotto–Dstny	+ 0"
8	Phil Bauhaus (GER)	Team Bahrain Victorious	+ 0"
9	Fernando Gaviria (COL)	Movistar Team	+ 0"
10	Oded Kogut (ISR)	Israel–Premier Tech	+ 0"

General classification after Stage 4
Rank	Rider	Team	Time
1	Jay Vine (AUS)	UAE Team Emirates	11h 41' 31"
2	Ben O'Connor (AUS)	Decathlon–AG2R La Mondiale	+ 11"
3	Brandon McNulty (USA)	UAE Team Emirates	+ 13"
4	Ilan Van Wilder (BEL)	Soudal–Quick-Step	+ 21"
5	Pello Bilbao (ESP)	Team Bahrain Victorious	+ 22"
6	Max Poole (GBR)	Team dsm–firmenich PostNL	+ 31"
7	Tobias Foss (NOR)	Ineos Grenadiers	+ 33"
8	Simon Carr (GBR)	EF Education–EasyPost	+ 36"
9	Mikkel Bjerg (DEN)	UAE Team Emirates	+ 37"
10	Attila Valter (HUN)	Visma–Lease a Bike	+ 39"

=== Stage 5 ===
23 February 2024 – Al Aqah to Umm Al Quwain, 182 km (113 mi)

Stage 5 Result
Rank	Rider	Team	Time
1	Olav Kooij (NED)	Visma–Lease a Bike	4h 08' 38"
2	Tim Merlier (BEL)	Soudal–Quick-Step	+ 0"
3	Sam Welsford (AUS)	Bora–Hansgrohe	+ 0"
4	Simone Consonni (ITA)	Lidl–Trek	+ 0"
5	Milan Fretin (BEL)	Cofidis	+ 0"
6	Phil Bauhaus (GER)	Team Bahrain Victorious	+ 0"
7	Dylan Groenewegen (NED)	Team Jayco–AlUla	+ 0"
8	Tim van Dijke (NED)	Visma–Lease a Bike	+ 0"
9	Kaden Groves (AUS)	Alpecin–Deceuninck	+ 0"
10	Fabio Jakobsen (NED)	Team dsm–firmenich PostNL	+ 0"

General classification after Stage 5
Rank	Rider	Team	Time
1	Jay Vine (AUS)	UAE Team Emirates	15h 50' 09"
2	Ben O'Connor (AUS)	Decathlon–AG2R La Mondiale	+ 11"
3	Brandon McNulty (USA)	UAE Team Emirates	+ 13"
4	Ilan Van Wilder (BEL)	Soudal–Quick-Step	+ 21"
5	Pello Bilbao (ESP)	Team Bahrain Victorious	+ 22"
6	Max Poole (GBR)	Team dsm–firmenich PostNL	+ 31"
7	Tobias Foss (NOR)	Ineos Grenadiers	+ 33"
8	Simon Carr (GBR)	EF Education–EasyPost	+ 36"
9	Lennert Van Eetvelt (BEL)	Lotto–Dstny	+ 37"
10	Mikkel Bjerg (DEN)	UAE Team Emirates	+ 37"

=== Stage 6 ===
24 February 2024 – Louvre Abu Dhabi to Abu Dhabi Breakwater, 138 km (86 mi)

Stage 6 Result
Rank	Rider	Team	Time
1	Tim Merlier (BEL)	Soudal–Quick-Step	3h 02' 14"
2	Arvid de Kleijn (NED)	Tudor Pro Cycling Team	+ 0"
3	Phil Bauhaus (GER)	Team Bahrain Victorious	+ 0"
4	Milan Fretin (BEL)	Cofidis	+ 0"
5	Gleb Syritsa	Astana Qazaqstan Team	+ 0"
6	Dylan Groenewegen (NED)	Team Jayco–AlUla	+ 0"
7	Jarne Van de Paar (BEL)	Lotto–Dstny	+ 0"
8	Fernando Gaviria (COL)	Movistar Team	+ 0"
9	Juan Sebastián Molano (COL)	UAE Team Emirates	+ 0"
10	Simone Consonni (ITA)	Lidl–Trek	+ 0"

General classification after Stage 6
Rank	Rider	Team	Time
1	Jay Vine (AUS)	UAE Team Emirates	18h 52' 23"
2	Ben O'Connor (AUS)	Decathlon–AG2R La Mondiale	+ 11"
3	Brandon McNulty (USA)	UAE Team Emirates	+ 13"
4	Ilan Van Wilder (BEL)	Soudal–Quick-Step	+ 21"
5	Pello Bilbao (ESP)	Team Bahrain Victorious	+ 22"
6	Max Poole (GBR)	Team dsm–firmenich PostNL	+ 31"
7	Tobias Foss (NOR)	Ineos Grenadiers	+ 33"
8	Simon Carr (GBR)	EF Education–EasyPost	+ 36"
9	Lennert Van Eetvelt (BEL)	Lotto–Dstny	+ 37"
10	Mikkel Bjerg (DEN)	UAE Team Emirates	+ 37"

=== Stage 7 ===
25 February 2024 – Al Ain to Jebel Hafeet, 161 km (100 mi)

Stage 7 Result
Rank	Rider	Team	Time
1	Lennert Van Eetvelt (BEL)	Lotto–Dstny	3h 38' 28"
2	Pello Bilbao (ESP)	Team Bahrain Victorious	+ 22"
3	Ben O'Connor (AUS)	Decathlon–AG2R La Mondiale	+ 22"
4	Michael Storer (AUS)	Tudor Pro Cycling Team	+ 22"
5	Attila Valter (HUN)	Visma–Lease a Bike	+ 22"
6	Carlos Verona (ESP)	Lidl–Trek	+ 22"
7	Ilan Van Wilder (BEL)	Soudal–Quick-Step	+ 27"
8	Brandon Rivera (COL)	Ineos Grenadiers	+ 38"
9	Einer Rubio (COL)	Movistar Team	+ 38"
10	Bart Lemmen (NED)	Visma–Lease a Bike	+ 47"

General classification after Stage 7
Rank	Rider	Team	Time
1	Lennert Van Eetvelt (BEL)	Lotto–Dstny	22h 31' 18"
2	Ben O'Connor (AUS)	Decathlon–AG2R La Mondiale	+ 2"
3	Pello Bilbao (ESP)	Team Bahrain Victorious	+ 11"
4	Ilan Van Wilder (BEL)	Soudal–Quick-Step	+ 21"
5	Attila Valter (HUN)	Visma–Lease a Bike	+ 34"
6	Michael Storer (AUS)	Tudor Pro Cycling Team	+ 36"
7	Max Poole (GBR)	Team dsm–firmenich PostNL	+ 55"
8	Brandon Rivera (COL)	Ineos Grenadiers	+ 1' 00"
9	Carlos Verona (ESP)	Lidl–Trek	+ 1' 09"
10	Bart Lemmen (NED)	Visma–Lease a Bike	+ 1' 13"

== Classification leadership table ==
Classification leadership by stage
Stage	Winner	General classification	Points classification	Sprints classification	Young rider classification	Team classification
1	Tim Merlier	Tim Merlier	Tim Merlier	Mark Stewart	Loe van Belle	Team dsm–firmenich PostNL
2	Brandon McNulty	Brandon McNulty	Brandon McNulty	Mark Stewart	Ilan Van Wilder	UAE Team Emirates
3	Ben O'Connor	Jay Vine	Mark Stewart	Mark Stewart	Ilan Van Wilder	UAE Team Emirates
4	Tim Merlier	Jay Vine	Mark Stewart	Mark Stewart	Ilan Van Wilder	UAE Team Emirates
5	Olav Kooij	Jay Vine	Tim Merlier	Mark Stewart	Ilan Van Wilder	UAE Team Emirates
6	Tim Merlier	Jay Vine	Tim Merlier	Mark Stewart	Ilan Van Wilder	UAE Team Emirates
7	Lennert Van Eetvelt	Lennert Van Eetvelt	Tim Merlier	Mark Stewart	Lennert Van Eetvelt	Lidl–Trek
Final		Lennert Van Eetvelt	Tim Merlier	Mark Stewart	Lennert Van Eetvelt	Lidl–Trek

== Classification standings ==
Legend
Denotes the winner of the general classification	Denotes the winner of the sprints classification
Denotes the winner of the points classification	Denotes the winner of the young rider classification

=== General classification ===
Final general classification (1–10)
Rank	Rider	Team	Time
1	Lennert Van Eetvelt (BEL)	Lotto–Dstny	22h 31' 18"
2	Ben O'Connor (AUS)	Decathlon–AG2R La Mondiale	+ 2"
3	Pello Bilbao (ESP)	Team Bahrain Victorious	+ 11"
4	Ilan Van Wilder (BEL)	Soudal–Quick-Step	+ 21"
5	Attila Valter (HUN)	Visma–Lease a Bike	+ 34"
6	Michael Storer (AUS)	Tudor Pro Cycling Team	+ 36"
7	Max Poole (GBR)	Team dsm–firmenich PostNL	+ 55"
8	Brandon Rivera (COL)	Ineos Grenadiers	+ 1' 00"
9	Carlos Verona (ESP)	Lidl–Trek	+ 1' 09"
10	Bart Lemmen (NED)	Visma–Lease a Bike	+ 1' 19"

=== Points classification ===
Final points classification (1–10)
Rank	Rider	Team	Points
1	Tim Merlier (BEL)	Soudal–Quick-Step	76
2	Mark Stewart (GBR)	Team Corratec–Vini Fantini	56
3	Lennert Van Eetvelt (BEL)	Lotto–Dstny	48
4	Arvid de Kleijn (NED)	Tudor Pro Cycling Team	48
5	Ben O'Connor (AUS)	Decathlon–AG2R La Mondiale	32
6	Olav Kooij (NED)	Visma–Lease a Bike	32
7	Jay Vine (AUS)	UAE Team Emirates	32
8	Pello Bilbao (ESP)	Team Bahrain Victorious	25
9	Phil Bauhaus (GER)	Team Bahrain Victorious	22
10	Brandon McNulty (USA)	UAE Team Emirates	21

=== Sprints classification ===
Final sprints classification (1–10)
Rank	Rider	Team	Points
1	Mark Stewart (GBR)	Team Corratec–Vini Fantini	56
2	Marco Murgano (ITA)	Team Corratec–Vini Fantini	20
3	Jonas Rickaert (BEL)	Alpecin–Deceuninck	18
4	Harm Vanhoucke (BEL)	Lotto–Dstny	18
5	Lennert Van Eetvelt (BEL)	Lotto–Dstny	16
6	Juan Pedro López (ESP)	Lidl–Trek	16
7	Silvan Dillier (SUI)	Alpecin–Deceuninck	11
8	Jacopo Mosca (ITA)	Lidl–Trek	8
9	Juan Sebastián Molano (COL)	UAE Team Emirates	8
10	Cameron Scott (AUS)	Team Bahrain Victorious	6

=== Young rider classification ===
Final young rider classification (1–10)
Rank	Rider	Team	Time
1	Lennert Van Eetvelt (BEL)	Lotto–Dstny	22h 31' 18"
2	Ilan Van Wilder (BEL)	Soudal–Quick-Step	+ 21"
3	Max Poole (GBR)	Team dsm–firmenich PostNL	+ 55"
4	Matthew Riccitello (USA)	Israel–Premier Tech	+ 1' 27"
5	Harold Martín López (ECU)	Astana Qazaqstan Team	+ 1' 48"
6	Mauri Vansevenant (BEL)	Soudal–Quick-Step	+ 2' 12"
7	Natnael Tesfatsion (ERI)	Lidl–Trek	+ 3' 34"
8	Jesús David Peña (COL)	Team Jayco–AlUla	+ 4' 02"
9	Iván Romeo (ESP)	Movistar Team	+ 4' 34"
10	Kevin Colleoni (ITA)	Intermarché–Wanty	+ 10' 23"

=== Teams classification ===
Final team classification (1–10)
Rank	Team	Time
1	(United States) Lidl–Trek	67h 38' 53"
2	(Belgium) Soudal–Quick-Step	+ 2' 50"
3	Team Bahrain Victorious	+ 5' 26"
4	(United Kingdom) Ineos Grenadiers	+ 6' 53"
5	(Spain) Movistar Team	+ 7' 40"
6	(Netherlands) Visma–Lease a Bike	+ 11' 43"
7	(France) Decathlon–AG2R La Mondiale	+ 14' 22"
8	(Germany) Bora–Hansgrohe	+ 14' 51"
9	Israel–Premier Tech	+ 20' 00"
10	(United Arab Emirates) UAE Team Emirates	+ 20' 30"
