= 2018 Critérium du Dauphiné =

Cycling race

2018 UCI World Tour, race 23 of 37
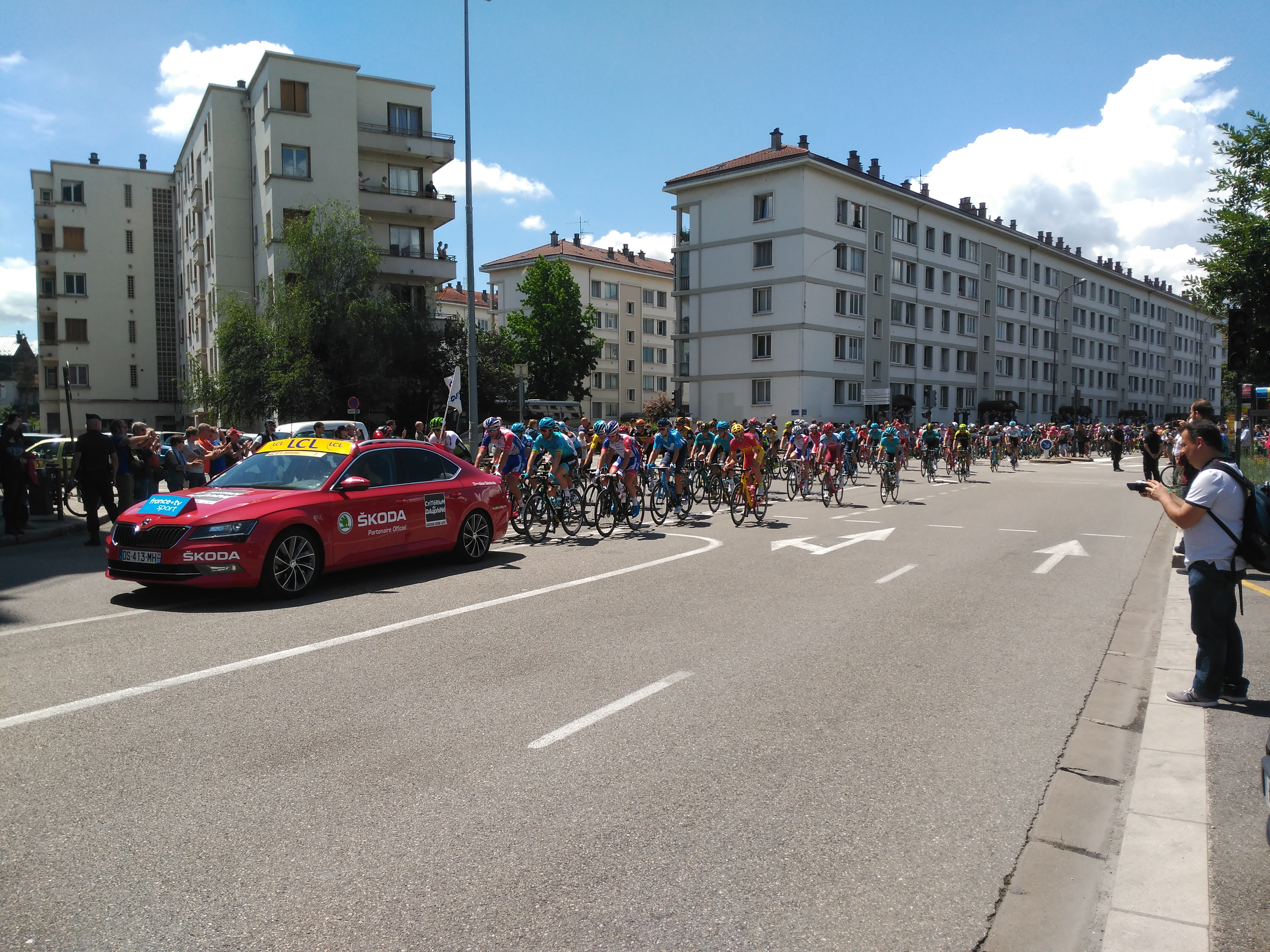
- The start of Stage 5 of the 2018 Critérium du Dauphiné, in Grenoble

Race details
- Dates: 3–10 June 2018
- Stages: 7 + Prologue
- Distance: 951.6 km (591.3 mi)

Results
Jersey awarded to the overall winner	Winner	Geraint Thomas (GBR)	(Team Sky)
	Second	Adam Yates (GBR)	(Mitchelton–Scott)
	Third	Romain Bardet (FRA)	(AG2R La Mondiale)
Jersey awarded to the points classification winner	Points	Daryl Impey (RSA)	(Mitchelton–Scott)
Jersey awarded to the mountains classification winner	Mountains	Dario Cataldo (ITA)	(Astana)
Jersey awarded to the young rider classification winner	Young rider	Pierre Latour (FRA)	(AG2R La Mondiale)
	Team	Team Sky	

The 2018 Critérium du Dauphiné was a road cycling stage race that took place between 3 and 10 June 2018 in France. It was the 70th edition of the Critérium du Dauphiné and the twenty-third event of the 2018 UCI World Tour.

The race was won by a British rider from Team Sky, as Geraint Thomas won his first Dauphiné GC.

== Teams ==
As the Critérium du Dauphiné was a UCI World Tour event, all eighteen UCI WorldTeams were invited automatically and obliged to enter a team in the race. Four UCI Professional Continental teams competed, completing the 22-team peloton.

UCI WorldTeams

- AG2R La Mondiale
- Astana
- Bahrain–Merida
- BMC Racing Team
- Bora–Hansgrohe
- EF Education First–Drapac p/b Cannondale
- Team Dimension Data
- Team Katusha–Alpecin
- LottoNL–Jumbo
- Lotto–Soudal
- Movistar Team
- Mitchelton–Scott
- Quick-Step Floors
- Team Sky
- Team Sunweb
- Trek–Segafredo
- UAE Team Emirates
- Groupama–FDJ

UCI Professional Continental teams

- Cofidis
- Fortuneo–Samsic
- Vital Concept
- Wanty–Groupe Gobert

== Route ==
Stage characteristics and winners
Stage	Date	Course	Distance	Type	Winner
P	3 June	Valence to Valence	6.6 km (4.1 mi)	Individual time trial	Michał Kwiatkowski (POL)
1	4 June	Valence to Saint-Just-Saint-Rambert	179 km (111.2 mi)	Hilly stage	Daryl Impey (RSA)
2	5 June	Montbrison to Belleville	181 km (112.5 mi)	Hilly stage	Pascal Ackermann (GER)
3	6 June	Pont-de-Vaux to Louhans-Châteaurenaud	35 km (21.7 mi)	Team time trial	Team Sky
4	7 June	Chazey-sur-Ain to Lans-en-Vercors	181 km (112.5 mi)	Mountain stage	Julian Alaphilippe (FRA)
5	8 June	Grenoble to Valmorel	130 km (80.8 mi)	Mountain stage	Dan Martin (IRL)
6	9 June	Frontenex to La Rosière	110 km (68.4 mi)	Mountain stage	Pello Bilbao (ESP)
7	10 June	Moûtiers to Saint-Gervais	136 km (84.5 mi)	Mountain stage	Adam Yates (GBR)

== Stages ==
=== Prologue ===
3 June 2018 — Valence, 6.6 km (4.1 mi)

Prologue result and general classification
Rank	Rider	Team	Time
1	Michał Kwiatkowski (POL)	Team Sky	7' 25"
2	Jos van Emden (NED)	LottoNL–Jumbo	+ 1"
3	Gianni Moscon (ITA)	Team Sky	+ 3"
4	Victor Campenaerts (BEL)	Lotto–Soudal	+ 5"
5	Patrick Bevin (NZL)	BMC Racing Team	+ 5"
6	Matthias Brändle (AUT)	Trek–Segafredo	+ 6"
7	Bob Jungels (LUX)	Quick-Step Floors	+ 7"
8	Jens Keukeleire (BEL)	Lotto–Soudal	+ 9"
9	Jonathan Castroviejo (ESP)	Team Sky	+ 9"
10	Brent Bookwalter (USA)	BMC Racing Team	+ 11"

=== Stage 1 ===
4 June 2018 — Valence to Saint-Just-Saint-Rambert, 179 km (111 mi)

Stage 1 result
Rank	Rider	Team	Time
1	Daryl Impey (RSA)	Mitchelton–Scott	4h 24' 26"
2	Julian Alaphilippe (FRA)	Quick-Step Floors	+ 0"
3	Pascal Ackermann (GER)	Bora–Hansgrohe	+ 0"
4	Tiesj Benoot (BEL)	Lotto–Soudal	+ 0"
5	Michał Kwiatkowski (POL)	Team Sky	+ 0"
6	Jesus Herrada (ESP)	Cofidis	+ 0"
7	Damiano Caruso (ITA)	BMC Racing Team	+ 0"
8	Xandro Meurisse (BEL)	Wanty–Groupe Gobert	+ 0"
9	Mike Teunissen (NED)	Team Sunweb	+ 0"
10	Jaime Roson (ESP)	Movistar Team	+ 0"

General classification after stage 1
Rank	Rider	Team	Time
1	Michał Kwiatkowski (POL)	Team Sky	4h 31' 51"
2	Daryl Impey (RSA)	Mitchelton–Scott	+ 2"
3	Gianni Moscon (ITA)	Team Sky	+ 3"
4	Bob Jungels (LUX)	Quick-Step Floors	+ 7"
5	Julian Alaphilippe (FRA)	Quick-Step Floors	+ 8"
6	Jens Keukeleire (BEL)	Lotto–Soudal	+ 9"
7	Jonathan Castroviejo (ESP)	Team Sky	+ 9"
8	Brent Bookwalter (USA)	BMC Racing Team	+ 11"
9	Mike Teunissen (NED)	Team Sunweb	+ 13"
10	Damiano Caruso (ITA)	BMC Racing Team	+ 15"

=== Stage 2 ===
5 June 2018 — Montbrison to Belleville, 181 km (112 mi)

Stage 2 result
Rank	Rider	Team	Time
1	Pascal Ackermann (GER)	Bora–Hansgrohe	4h 19' 57"
2	Edvald Boasson Hagen (NOR)	Team Dimension Data	+ 0"
3	Daryl Impey (RSA)	Mitchelton–Scott	+ 0"
4	Oliver Naesen (BEL)	AG2R La Mondiale	+ 0"
5	Jens Keukeleire (BEL)	Lotto–Soudal	+ 0"
6	Julien Simon (FRA)	Cofidis	+ 0"
7	Dion Smith (NZL)	Wanty–Groupe Gobert	+ 0"
8	Patrick Bevin (NZL)	BMC Racing Team	+ 0"
9	Toms Skujiņš (LAT)	Trek–Segafredo	+ 0"
10	Romain Hardy (FRA)	Fortuneo–Samsic	+ 0"

General classification after stage 2
Rank	Rider	Team	Time
1	Daryl Impey (RSA)	Mitchelton–Scott	8h 51' 46"
2	Michał Kwiatkowski (POL)	Team Sky	+ 2"
3	Gianni Moscon (ITA)	Team Sky	+ 5"
4	Bob Jungels (LUX)	Quick-Step Floors	+ 9"
5	Julian Alaphilippe (FRA)	Quick-Step Floors	+ 10"
6	Jens Keukeleire (BEL)	Lotto–Soudal	+ 11"
7	Jonathan Castroviejo (ESP)	Team Sky	+ 11"
8	Brent Bookwalter (USA)	BMC Racing Team	+ 13"
9	Edvald Boasson Hagen (NOR)	Team Dimension Data	+ 14"
10	Damiano Caruso (ITA)	BMC Racing Team	+ 17"

=== Stage 3 ===
6 June 2018 — Pont-de-Vaux to Louhans-Châteaurenaud, 35 km (22 mi) (TTT)

Stage 3 result
Rank	Team	Time
1	Team Sky	36' 33"
2	BMC Racing Team	+ 37"
3	Lotto–Soudal	+ 52"
4	Mitchelton–Scott	+ 56"
5	Quick-Step Floors	+ 1' 01"
6	Trek–Segafredo	+ 1' 26"
7	AG2R La Mondiale	+ 1' 29"
8	Movistar Team	+ 1' 31"
9	LottoNL–Jumbo	+ 1' 32"
10	Groupama–FDJ	+ 1' 33"

General classification after stage 3
Rank	Rider	Team	Time
1	Michał Kwiatkowski (POL)	Team Sky	9h 28' 21"
2	Gianni Moscon (ITA)	Team Sky	+ 3"
3	Jonathan Castroviejo (ESP)	Team Sky	+ 9"
4	Geraint Thomas (GBR)	Team Sky	+ 21"
5	Brent Bookwalter (USA)	BMC Racing Team	+ 48"
6	Damiano Caruso (ITA)	BMC Racing Team	+ 52"
7	Joey Rosskopf (USA)	BMC Racing Team	+ 53"
8	Daryl Impey (RSA)	Mitchelton–Scott	+ 54"
9	Jens Keukeleire (BEL)	Lotto–Soudal	+ 1' 01"
10	Bob Jungels (LUX)	Quick-Step Floors	+ 1' 08"

=== Stage 4 ===
7 June 2018 — Chazey-sur-Ain to Lans-en-Vercors, 181 km (112 mi)

Stage 4 result
Rank	Rider	Team	Time
1	Julian Alaphilippe (FRA)	Quick-Step Floors	4h 26' 58"
2	Daniel Martin (IRL)	UAE Team Emirates	+ 0"
3	Geraint Thomas (GBR)	Team Sky	+ 0"
4	Romain Bardet (FRA)	AG2R La Mondiale	+ 0"
5	Pierre Latour (FRA)	AG2R La Mondiale	+ 5"
6	Adam Yates (GBR)	Mitchelton–Scott	+ 5"
7	Emanuel Buchmann (GER)	Bora–Hansgrohe	+ 5"
8	Guillaume Martin (FRA)	Wanty–Groupe Gobert	+ 8"
9	Gianni Moscon (ITA)	Team Sky	+ 8"
10	Tiesj Benoot (BEL)	Lotto–Soudal	+ 8"

General classification after stage 4
Rank	Rider	Team	Time
1	Gianni Moscon (ITA)	Team Sky	13h 55' 30"
2	Michał Kwiatkowski (POL)	Team Sky	+ 6"
3	Geraint Thomas (GBR)	Team Sky	+ 6"
4	Julian Alaphilippe (FRA)	Quick-Step Floors	+ 48"
5	Damiano Caruso (ITA)	BMC Racing Team	+ 49"
6	Bob Jungels (LUX)	Quick-Step Floors	+ 1' 05"
7	Adam Yates (GBR)	Mitchelton–Scott	+ 1' 11"
8	Tiesj Benoot (BEL)	Lotto–Soudal	+ 1' 13"
9	Romain Bardet (FRA)	AG2R La Mondiale	+ 1' 41"
10	Marc Soler (ESP)	Movistar Team	+ 1' 48"

=== Stage 5 ===
8 June 2018 — Grenoble to Valmorel, 130 km (81 mi)

Stage 5 result
Rank	Rider	Team	Time
1	Daniel Martin (IRL)	UAE Team Emirates	3h 21' 19"
2	Geraint Thomas (GBR)	Team Sky	+ 4"
3	Adam Yates (GBR)	Mitchelton–Scott	+ 15"
4	Emanuel Buchmann (GER)	Bora–Hansgrohe	+ 16"
5	Daniel Navarro (ESP)	Cofidis	+ 16"
6	Romain Bardet (FRA)	AG2R La Mondiale	+ 16"
7	Damiano Caruso (ITA)	BMC Racing Team	+ 24"
8	Ilnur Zakarin (RUS)	Team Katusha–Alpecin	+ 24"
9	Guillaume Martin (FRA)	Wanty–Groupe Gobert	+ 26"
10	Antwan Tolhoek (NED)	LottoNL–Jumbo	+ 26"

General classification after stage 5
Rank	Rider	Team	Time
1	Geraint Thomas (GBR)	Team Sky	17h 16' 53"
2	Damiano Caruso (ITA)	BMC Racing Team	+ 1' 09"
3	Gianni Moscon (ITA)	Team Sky	+ 1' 09"
4	Julian Alaphilippe (FRA)	Quick-Step Floors	+ 1' 10"
5	Michał Kwiatkowski (POL)	Team Sky	+ 1' 15"
6	Adam Yates (GBR)	Mitchelton–Scott	+ 1' 18"
7	Romain Bardet (FRA)	AG2R La Mondiale	+ 1' 53"
8	Bob Jungels (LUX)	Quick-Step Floors	+ 2' 03"
9	Marc Soler (ESP)	Movistar Team	+ 2' 10"
10	Emanuel Buchmann (GER)	Bora–Hansgrohe	+ 2' 23"

=== Stage 6 ===
9 June 2018 — Frontenex to La Rosière, 110 km (68 mi)

Stage 6 result
Rank	Rider	Team	Time
1	Pello Bilbao (ESP)	Astana	3h 34' 11"
2	Geraint Thomas (GBR)	Team Sky	+ 21"
3	Daniel Martin (IRL)	UAE Team Emirates	+ 23"
4	Romain Bardet (FRA)	AG2R La Mondiale	+ 23"
5	Adam Yates (GBR)	Mitchelton–Scott	+ 26"
6	Emanuel Buchmann (GER)	Bora–Hansgrohe	+ 1' 02"
7	Ilnur Zakarin (RUS)	Team Katusha–Alpecin	+ 1' 20"
8	Pierre Latour (FRA)	AG2R La Mondiale	+ 1' 40"
9	Tao Geoghegan Hart (GBR)	Team Sky	+ 1' 45"
10	Valerio Conti (ITA)	UAE Team Emirates	+ 1' 45"

General classification after stage 6
Rank	Rider	Team	Time
1	Geraint Thomas (GBR)	Team Sky	20h 51' 19"
2	Adam Yates (GBR)	Mitchelton–Scott	+ 1' 29"
3	Romain Bardet (FRA)	AG2R La Mondiale	+ 2' 01"
4	Daniel Martin (IRL)	UAE Team Emirates	+ 2' 30"
5	Damiano Caruso (ITA)	BMC Racing Team	+ 2' 39"
6	Emanuel Buchmann (GER)	Bora–Hansgrohe	+ 3' 10"
7	Ilnur Zakarin (RUS)	Team Katusha–Alpecin	+ 3' 29"
8	Marc Soler (ESP)	Movistar Team	+ 3' 40"
9	Pierre Latour (FRA)	AG2R La Mondiale	+ 3' 49"
10	Pierre Rolland (FRA)	EF Education First–Drapac	+ 4' 00"

=== Stage 7 ===
10 June 2018 — Moûtiers to Saint-Gervais, 136 km (85 mi)

Stage 7 result
Rank	Rider	Team	Time
1	Adam Yates (GBR)	Mitchelton–Scott	3h 51' 34"
2	Daniel Navarro (ESP)	Cofidis	+ 4"
3	Romain Bardet (FRA)	AG2R La Mondiale	+ 9"
4	Emanuel Buchmann (GER)	Bora–Hansgrohe	+ 14"
5	Geraint Thomas (GBR)	Team Sky	+ 19"
6	Daniel Martin (IRL)	UAE Team Emirates	+ 24"
7	Damiano Caruso (ITA)	BMC Racing Team	+ 24"
8	Guillaume Martin (FRA)	Wanty–Groupe Gobert	+ 28"
9	Pierre Latour (FRA)	AG2R La Mondiale	+ 35"
10	Pierre Rolland (FRA)	EF Education First–Drapac	+ 41"

Final general classification
Rank	Rider	Team	Time
1	Geraint Thomas (GBR)	Team Sky	24h 43' 12"
2	Adam Yates (GBR)	Mitchelton–Scott	+ 1' 00"
3	Romain Bardet (FRA)	AG2R La Mondiale	+ 1' 47"
4	Daniel Martin (IRL)	UAE Team Emirates	+ 2' 35"
5	Damiano Caruso (ITA)	BMC Racing Team	+ 2' 44"
6	Emanuel Buchmann (GER)	Bora–Hansgrohe	+ 3' 05"
7	Pierre Latour (FRA)	AG2R La Mondiale	+ 4' 05"
8	Pierre Rolland (FRA)	EF Education First–Drapac	+ 4' 22"
9	Daniel Navarro (ESP)	Cofidis	+ 4' 31"
10	Ilnur Zakarin (RUS)	Team Katusha–Alpecin	+ 4' 45"

== Classification leadership table ==
In the Critérium du Dauphiné, four different jerseys were awarded. The most important was the general classification, which was calculated by adding each cyclist's finishing times on each stage. Time bonuses were awarded to the first three finishers on all stages except for the individual time trial: the stage winner won a ten-second bonus, with six and four seconds for the second and third riders respectively. The rider with the least accumulated time is the race leader, identified by a yellow jersey with a blue bar; the winner of this classification was considered the winner of the race.

Points for the points classification
Position	1	2	3	4	5	6	7	8	9	10
Stages 1–3 & 5	25	22	20	18	16	14	12	10	8	6
Stages 4, 6–8	15	12	10	8	6	5	4	3	2	1

Additionally, there was a points classification, which awarded a green jersey. In the classification, cyclists received points for finishing in the top 10 in a stage. More points were awarded on the flatter stages in the opening half of the race.

Points for the mountains classification
Position	1	2	3	4	5	6	7	8	9	10
Points for Hors-category	15	12	10	8	6	5	4	3	2	1
Points for Category 1	10	8	6	4	2	1	0			
Points for Category 2	5	3	2	1	0					
Points for Category 3	2	1	0							
Points for Category 4	1	0								

There was also a mountains classification, the leadership of which was marked by a blue jersey with white polka dots. In the mountains classification, points towards the classification were won by reaching the top of a climb before other cyclists. Each climb was categorised as either hors, first, second, third, or fourth-category, with more points available for the higher-categorised climbs. Hors-category climbs awarded the most points; the first ten riders were able to accrue points, compared with the first six on first-category climbs, the first four on second-category, the first two on third-category and only the first for fourth-category.

The fourth jersey represented the young rider classification, marked by a white jersey. This was decided the same way as the general classification, but only riders born on or after 1 January 1993 were eligible to be ranked in the classification. There was also a team classification, in which the times of the best three cyclists per team on each stage were added together; the leading team at the end of the race was the team with the lowest total time.

Classification leadership by stage
Stage	Winner	General classification	Points classification	Mountains classification	Young rider classification	Team classification
P	Michał Kwiatkowski	Michał Kwiatkowski	Michał Kwiatkowski	not awarded	Gianni Moscon	Team Sky
1	Daryl Impey	Michał Kwiatkowski	Michał Kwiatkowski	Brice Feillu	Gianni Moscon	Team Sky
2	Pascal Ackermann	Daryl Impey	Daryl Impey	Brice Feillu	Gianni Moscon	Team Sky
3	Team Sky	Michał Kwiatkowski	Daryl Impey	Brice Feillu	Gianni Moscon	Team Sky
4	Julian Alaphilippe	Gianni Moscon	Daryl Impey	Dario Cataldo	Gianni Moscon	Team Sky
5	Dan Martin	Geraint Thomas	Daryl Impey	Dario Cataldo	Gianni Moscon	Team Sky
6	Pello Bilbao	Geraint Thomas	Daryl Impey	Dario Cataldo	Marc Soler	Team Sky
7	Adam Yates	Geraint Thomas	Daryl Impey	Dario Cataldo	Pierre Latour	Team Sky
Final		Geraint Thomas	Daryl Impey	Dario Cataldo	Pierre Latour	Team Sky
