= Montbrison =

Montbrison may refer to:

- Arrondissement of Montbrison, Loire département, France
- Canton of Montbrison, Loire département, France
- Montbrison, Loire, a commune in the Arrondissement
- Montbrison-sur-Lez, a commune in the Drôme département, France
