= Valmorel =

Ski resort in Tarentaise Valley, Savoie, France

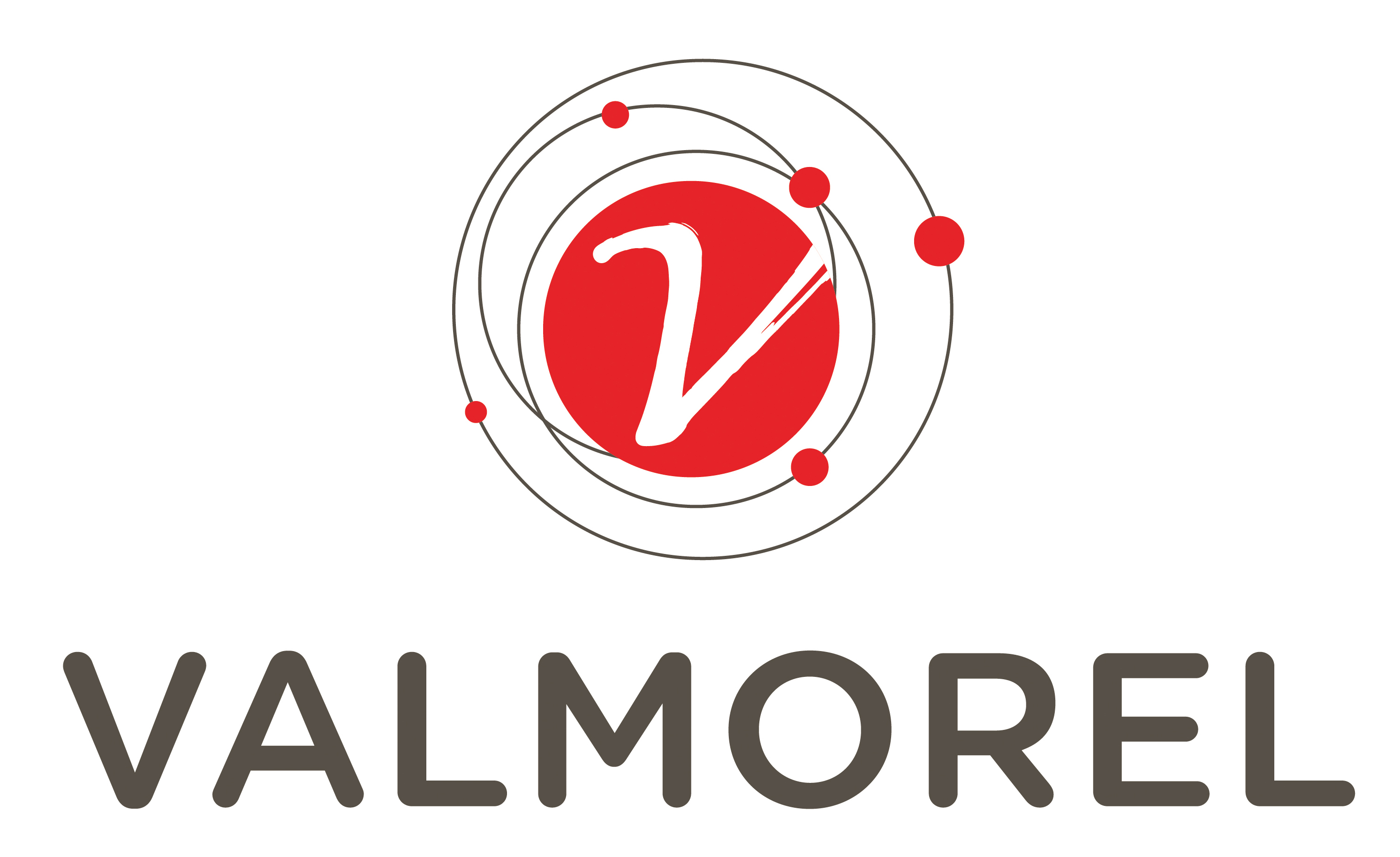

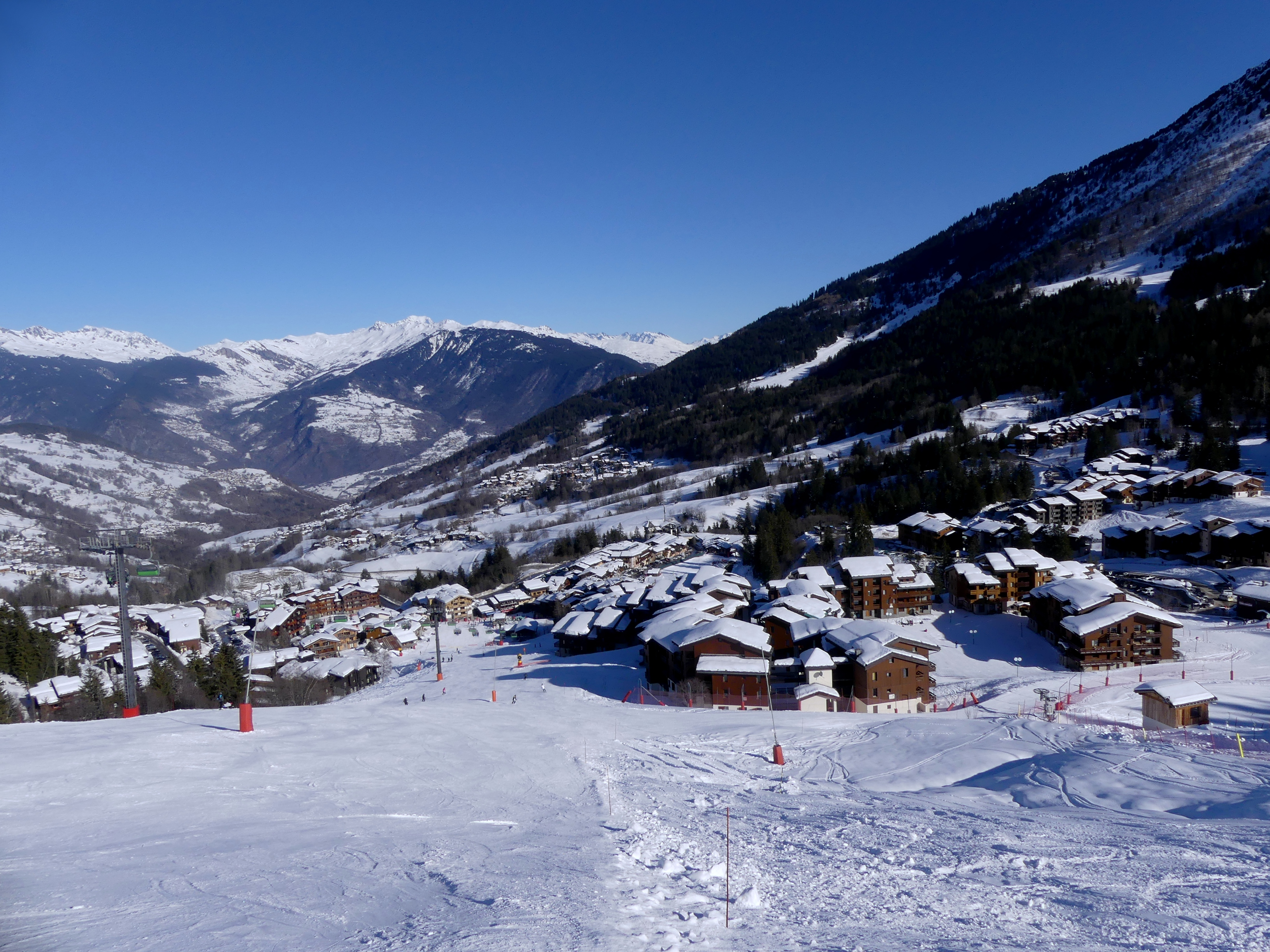

- Location within Alps
- Nearest city: Albertville
- Coordinates: 45°26′03″N 6°26′32″E
- Top elevation: 2,550 m (8,370 ft)
- Base elevation: 1,200 m (3,900 ft)
- Skiable area: 65 km of runs
- Trails: 47; 10 (21%) beginner 25 (54%) easy 8 (17%) intermediate 4 (8%) difficult
- Lift system: 30 (1 cable car, 2 gondolas, 8 chair lifts, 11 drag lifts)
- Snowmaking: about 200 cannons
- Website: Website

Valmorel (French pronunciation: [valmɔʁɛl]) is a ski resort in the Tarentaise Valley, located in the communes of Les Avanchers-Valmorel and La Léchère, in the Savoie department in the Auvergne-Rhône-Alpes region.

The station was opened in 1976. The domain is connected to the Mauriennaise station at Saint-François-Longchamp and forms the area known as Grand-Domaine.

== Resort name ==
Valmorel is named from the valley of the River Morel, a tributary of the River Isère.

== Resort Access ==
The route to Valmorel passes Albertville on the N90 until the Aigueblanche / La Lèchère / Doucy Tarentaise / Valmorel exit ramp. From there one route goes to Le Bois and continues directly to Val Morel. The other route goes through Doucy Tarentaise and then the hamlets of Raclaz, Villaret and Meiller. The second route passes the small resort of Doucy-Combelouvière which is linked to Valmorel by ski slopes.

== Sports ==
=== Cycling ===
The climb to Valmorel, over 12.7 km (7.9 mi) at a 7% gradient from Aigueblanche, completed the fifth stage of the 2013 Critérium du Dauphiné. The climb was classified as hors catégorie. The stage victory went to Christopher Froome, who beat Alberto Contador and Matthew Busche.

The 2018 Critérium du Dauphiné also had a Stage 5 finish at Valmorel. Dan Martin won this stage ahead of Geraint Thomas, with Thomas taking the yellow jersey.
