= Lennert Van Eetvelt =

Belgian cyclist

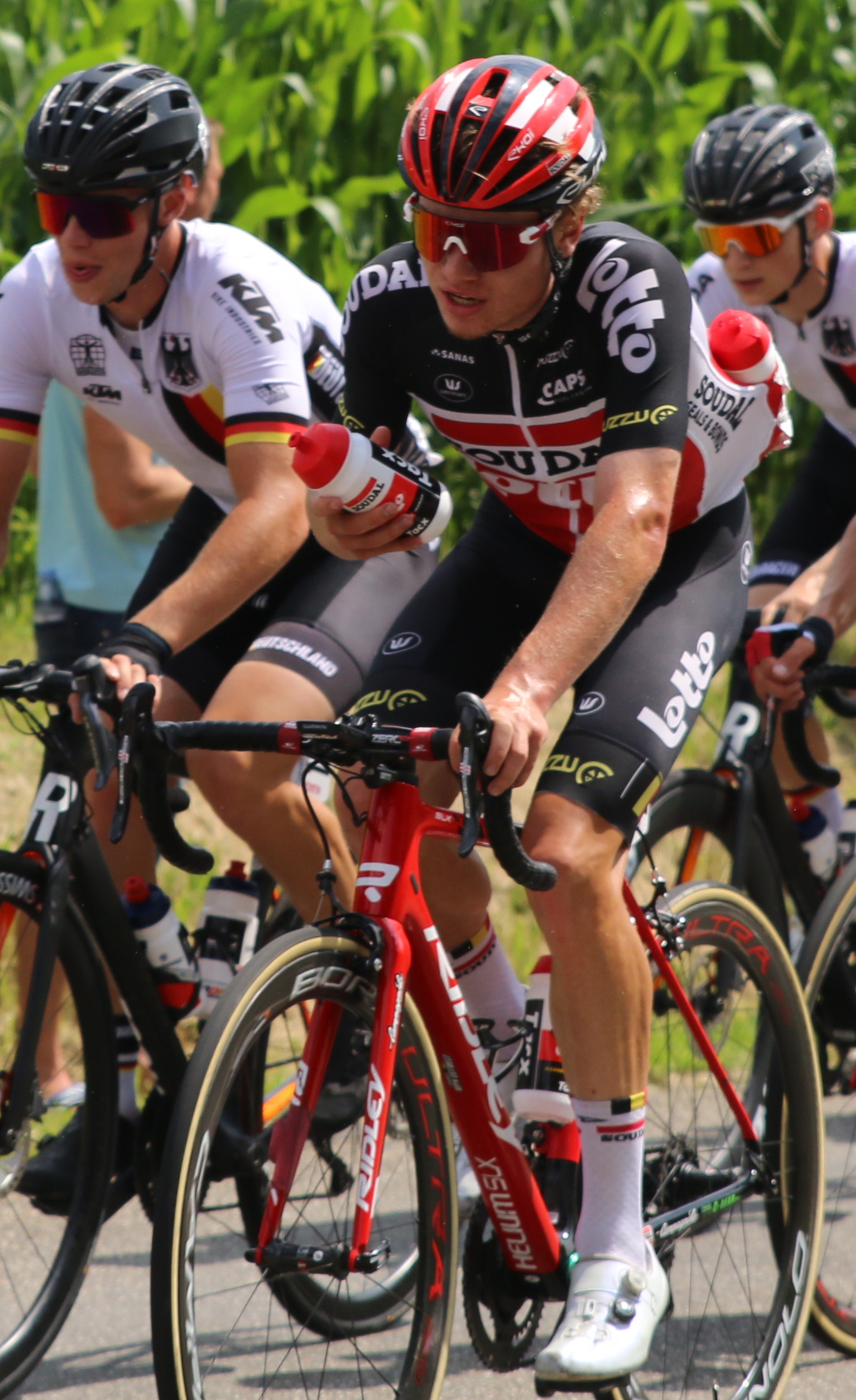
- Van Eetvelt at the 2021 Tour Alsace

Personal information
- Born: 17 July 2001 (age 25) Tienen, Belgium
- Height: 1.75 m (5 ft 9 in)
- Weight: 63 kg (139 lb)

Cycling career
- Sport: Cycling
- Current team: Lotto–Intermarché
- Discipline: Road
- Role: Rider
- Rider type: Climber

Amateur teams
- 2018: Wim Ruelens Olympia Tienen
- 2019: Brain² Olympia Tienen
- 2020–2022: Lotto–Soudal U23

Professional team
- 2023–: Lotto–Dstny

Major wins
- Stage races Tour of Guangxi (2024) UAE Tour (2024)

Lennert Van Eetvelt (born 17 July 2001) is a Belgian cyclist, who currently rides for UCI WorldTeam Lotto–Intermarché.

== Career ==
=== Early years ===
Van Eetvelt started cycling when he was 8 or 9 years old. As a junior rider, he finished third in the Aubel–Thimister–Stavelot and eighth in the Course de la Paix Juniors, before being recruited by Lotto–Soudal U23, the development program for UCI ProTeam Lotto–Soudal, in 2020. The following year, he was crowned the Belgian under-23 time trial champion. In 2022, he showed strength in stage races, winning the Course de la Paix U23 – Grand Prix Jeseníky and finishing runner-up in the Giro Ciclistico d'Italia and the Tour Alsace. In April, he also finished second to Romain Grégoire in the single-day Liège–Bastogne–Liège Espoirs.

=== Lotto–Dstny (2023–2026) ===
Van Eetvelt stepped up to Lotto–Dstny in 2023. In his first week racing as a professional, Van Eetvelt took two podium finishes in the Challenge Mallorca, finishing second in the Trofeo Serra de Tramuntana and third in the Trofeo Andratx–Mirador D'es Colomer. In March, he took part in his first UCI World Tour level event, finishing 15th overall in the Volta a Catalunya. In April, he competed in the La Flèche Wallonne, finishing 22nd. He then won the Alpes Isère Tour in May while riding down a level with the development squad, taking solo victories on the last two stages. He took his first pro level win on stage two of the Sibiu Cycling Tour in July. He entered his first Grand Tour: the Vuelta a España in August. On stage 14, he placed third, having been part of the breakaway, followed by a 4th place on the penultimate stage, again being part of the breakaway.

On January 26, 2024, he won the Trofeo Serra de Tramuntana, part of the Challenge Mallorca, beating Aleksandr Vlasov and Brandon McNulty in a three-way sprint. On February 25, he won the final stage solo at the top of Jebel Hafeet and took the general classification of the UAE Tour, his first victory in a UCI World Tour race.

== Major results ==
2019
3rd Overall Aubel–Thimister–Stavelot

1st Mountains classification

5th Overall Tour du Pays de Vaud
8th Overall Course de la Paix Juniors
2021
National Under-23 Road Championships

1st Time trial
3rd Road race

UEC European Under-23 Road Championships

5th Road race
9th Time trial

5th Liège–Bastogne–Liège Espoirs
8th Overall Tour Alsace
2022
1st Overall Course de la Paix U23 – Grand Prix Jeseníky

1st Stage 2

2nd Overall Giro Ciclistico d'Italia

1st Stage 6

2nd Overall Tour Alsace
2nd Liège–Bastogne–Liège Espoirs
2nd Flèche Ardennaise
3rd Time trial, National Under-23 Road Championships
6th Overall Tour de Normandie
2023 (1 pro win)
1st Overall Alpes Isère Tour

1st Points classification
1st Young rider classification
1st Stages 4 & 5

2nd Overall Sibiu Cycling Tour

1st Young rider classification
1st Stage 2

2nd Trofeo Serra de Tramuntana
3rd Mercan'Tour Classic
3rd Trofeo Andratx–Mirador D'es Colomer
2024 (5)
1st Overall Tour of Guangxi

1st Young rider classification
1st Stage 5

1st Overall UAE Tour

1st Young rider classification
1st Stage 7

1st Trofeo Serra de Tramuntana
3rd Clásica de San Sebastián
4th Overall Sibiu Cycling Tour
7th Giro di Lombardia
8th Trofeo Pollença–Port d'Andratx
2025
8th Overall Volta a Catalunya
9th Strade Bianche
2026 (3)
1st Overall Okolo Slovenska

1st Stages 3 & 5

2nd Overall Arctic Race of Norway
6th Overall UAE Tour
7th GP Miguel Induráin
10th Grand Prix Cycliste de Montréal

=== Grand Tour general classification results timeline ===
Grand Tour	2023	2024	2025	2026
Giro d'Italia	—	—	—	DNF
Tour de France	—	—	DNF	
Vuelta a España	32	DNF	—	

Legend
—	Did not compete
DNF	Did not finish
