= 2017 Tour of Guangxi =

2017 UCI World Tour

Race details
- Dates: 19–24 October 2017
- Stages: 6
- Distance: 921.2 km (572.4 mi)
- Winning time: 20h 59' 49"

Results
	Winner	Tim Wellens (BEL)
	Second	Bauke Mollema (NED)
	Third	Nicolas Roche (IRL)
	Points	Fernando Gaviria (COL)
	Mountains	Daniel Oss (ITA)
	Youth	Julian Alaphilippe (FRA)
	Team	BMC Racing Team

The 2017 Tour of Guangxi was a road cycling stage race that took place in China between 19 and 24 October 2017. It was the 1st edition of the Tour of Guangxi and was part of the 2017 UCI World Tour as a 2.UWT event. The race was won by Belgian cyclist Tim Wellens of Lotto–Soudal.

The points classification was won by Fernando Gaviria of Quick-Step Floors.

The mountains classification was won by Daniel Oss of BMC Racing Team.

The youth classification was won by Julian Alaphilippe of Quick-Step Floors.

== Teams ==
Eighteen teams of up to seven riders started the race:

UCI WorldTeams

- Astana
- BMC Racing Team
- Cannondale–Drapac
- Lotto–Soudal
- Orica–Scott
- Team Katusha–Alpecin
- Team Sky
- Trek–Segafredo
- Bahrain–Merida
- Bora–Hansgrohe
- Team Dimension Data
- Movistar Team
- Quick-Step Floors
- LottoNL–Jumbo
- Team Sunweb
- UAE Team Emirates

UCI Professional Continental teams

- Caja Rural–Seguros RGA
- Nippo–Vini Fantini

== Route ==
Stage characteristics and winners
Stage	Date	Course	Distance	Type	Stage winner
1	19 October	Beihai to Beihai	107.4 km (66.7 mi)	Flat stage	Fernando Gaviria (COL)
2	20 October	Qinzhou to Nanning	156.7 km (97.4 mi)	Flat stage	Fernando Gaviria (COL)
3	21 October	Nanning to Nanning	125.4 km (77.9 mi)	Flat stage	Fernando Gaviria (COL)
4	22 October	Nanning to Mashan County	151 km (94 mi)	Medium mountain stage	Tim Wellens (BEL)
5	23 October	Liuzhou to Guilin	212.2 km (131.9 mi)	Medium mountain stage	Dylan Groenewegen (NED)
6	24 October	Guilin to Guilin	168.1 km (104.5 mi)	Medium mountain stage	Fernando Gaviria (COL)

== Result ==
Final general classification

Rank	Rider	Team	Time
1	Tim Wellens (BEL)	Lotto–Soudal	20h 59' 49"
2	Bauke Mollema (NED)	Trek–Segafredo	+ 6"
3	Nicolas Roche (IRL)	BMC Racing Team	+ 11"
4	Julian Alaphilippe (FRA)	Quick-Step Floors	+ 15"
5	Ben Hermans (BEL)	BMC Racing Team	+ 18"
6	Matej Mohorič (SLO)	UAE Team Emirates	+ 24"
7	Wout Poels (NED)	Team Sky	s.t.
8	Silvan Dillier (SUI)	BMC Racing Team	+ 29"
9	Rein Taaramäe (EST)	Team Katusha–Alpecin	s.t.
10	Mekseb Debesay (ERI)	Team Dimension Data	+ 31"
