= Snoopy Island =

Island in the United Arab Emirates

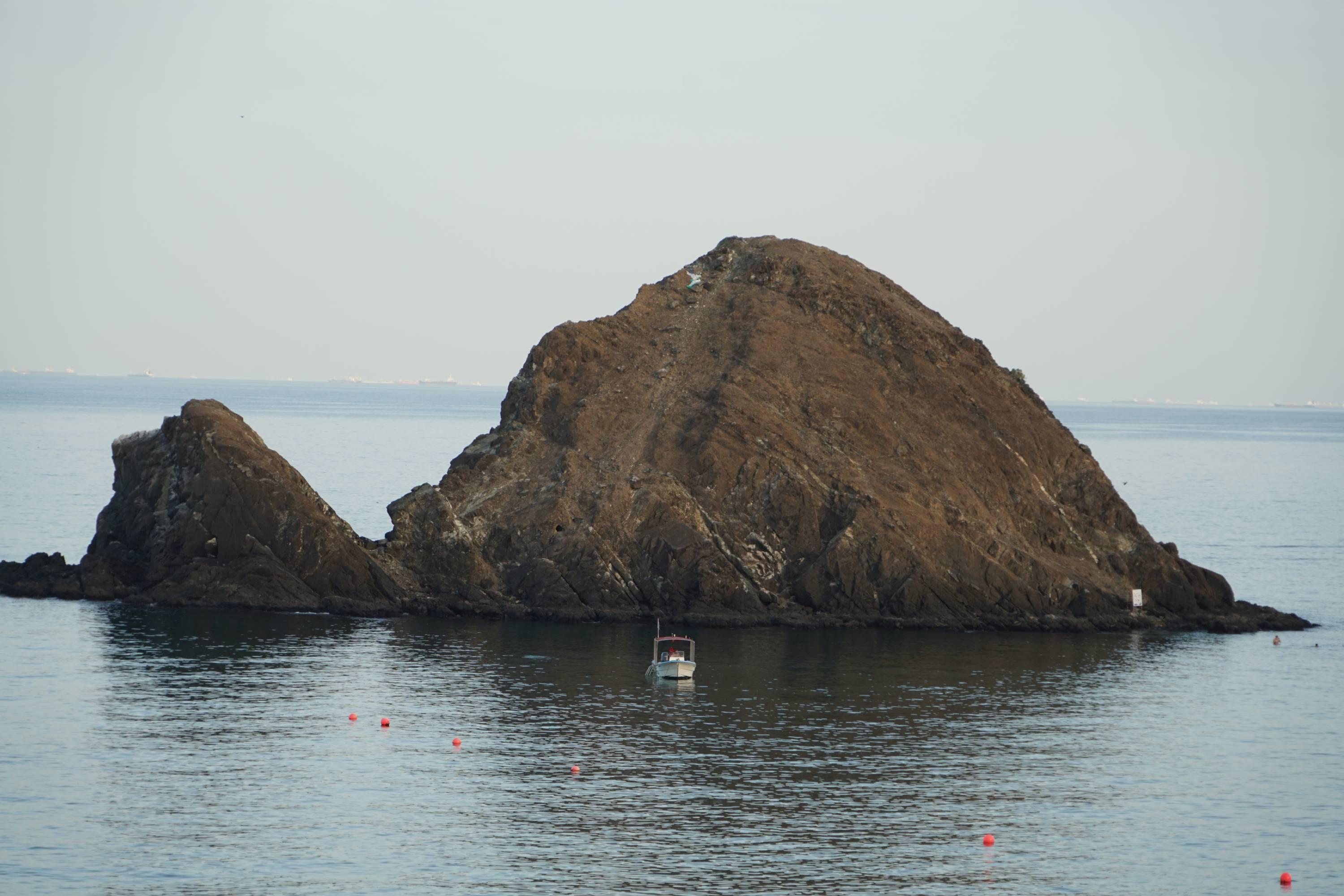
- Snoopy Island

- Location within United Arab Emirates

Geography
- Location: Gulf of Oman
- Coordinates: 25°29′32″N 56°21′51″E
- Area: 0.7 ha (1.7 acres)
- Length: 100 m (300 ft)
- Width: 70 m (230 ft)
- Highest elevation: 19 m (62 ft)

Administration
- United Arab Emirates

Snoopy Island (Arabic: جزيرة سنوبي), also known as Al Aqah Island (Arabic: جزيرة العقّة), is a small rock island off the coastal town of Al Aqah in the northern coast of the Emirate of Fujairah, United Arab Emirates. The island is located on the Gulf of Oman.

The island is a popular tourist destination for scuba diving, snorkeling, and kayaking due to the surrounding coral reef and clear waters.

== Etymology ==
The island name is in reference to the island's rocks resemblance to the comic strip character Snoopy lying on his back. The Arabic name is derived from the surrounding town of Al Aqah (Arabic: جزيرة الغبّة, romanized: Jazirat al-'Aqqa). GeoNames has the name Jazīrat al Ghubbah. On the nautical chart there is the entry Jaz al Ghubbah.

== Gallery ==
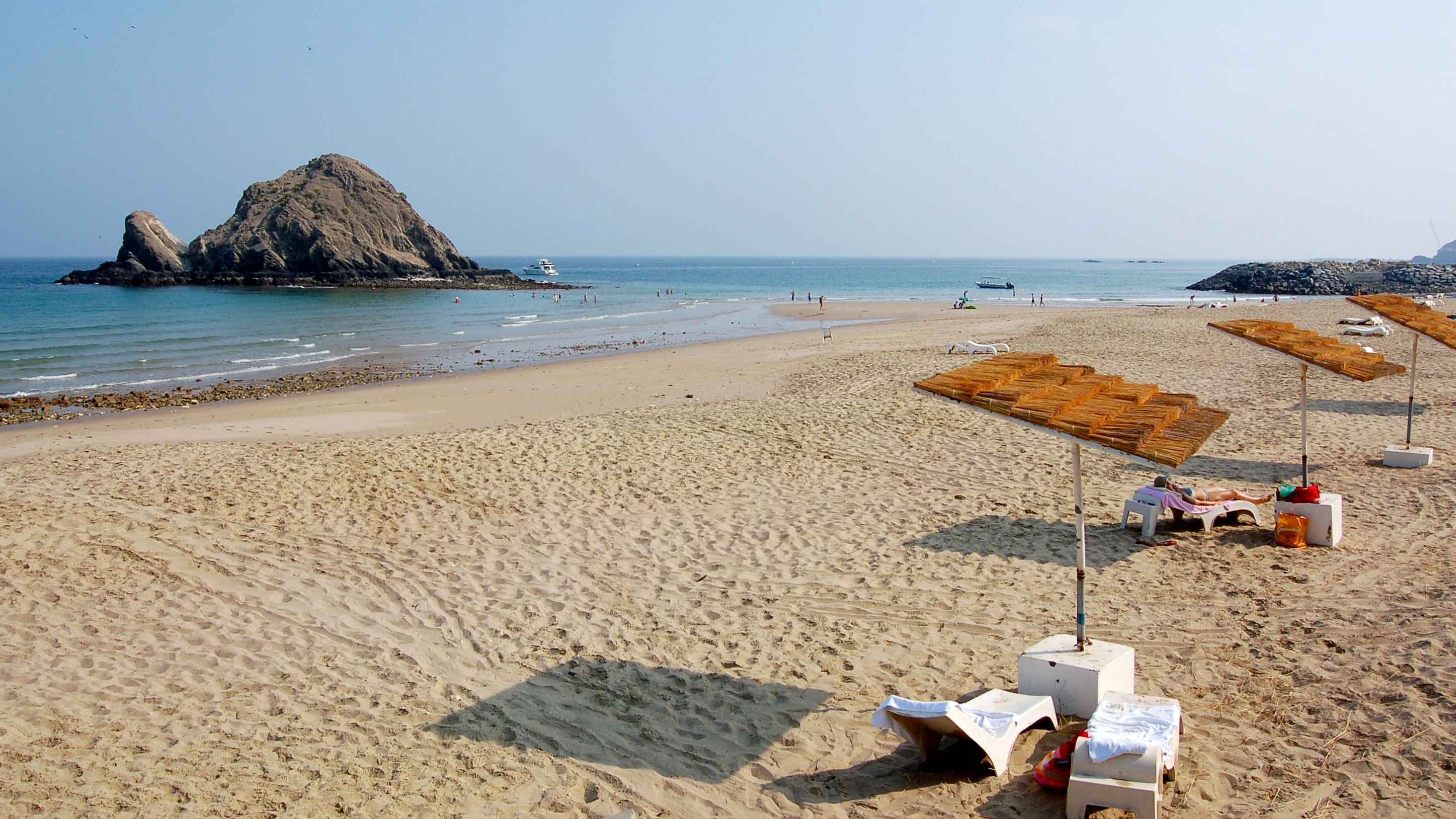
Snoopy Island seen from Al Aqah Beach

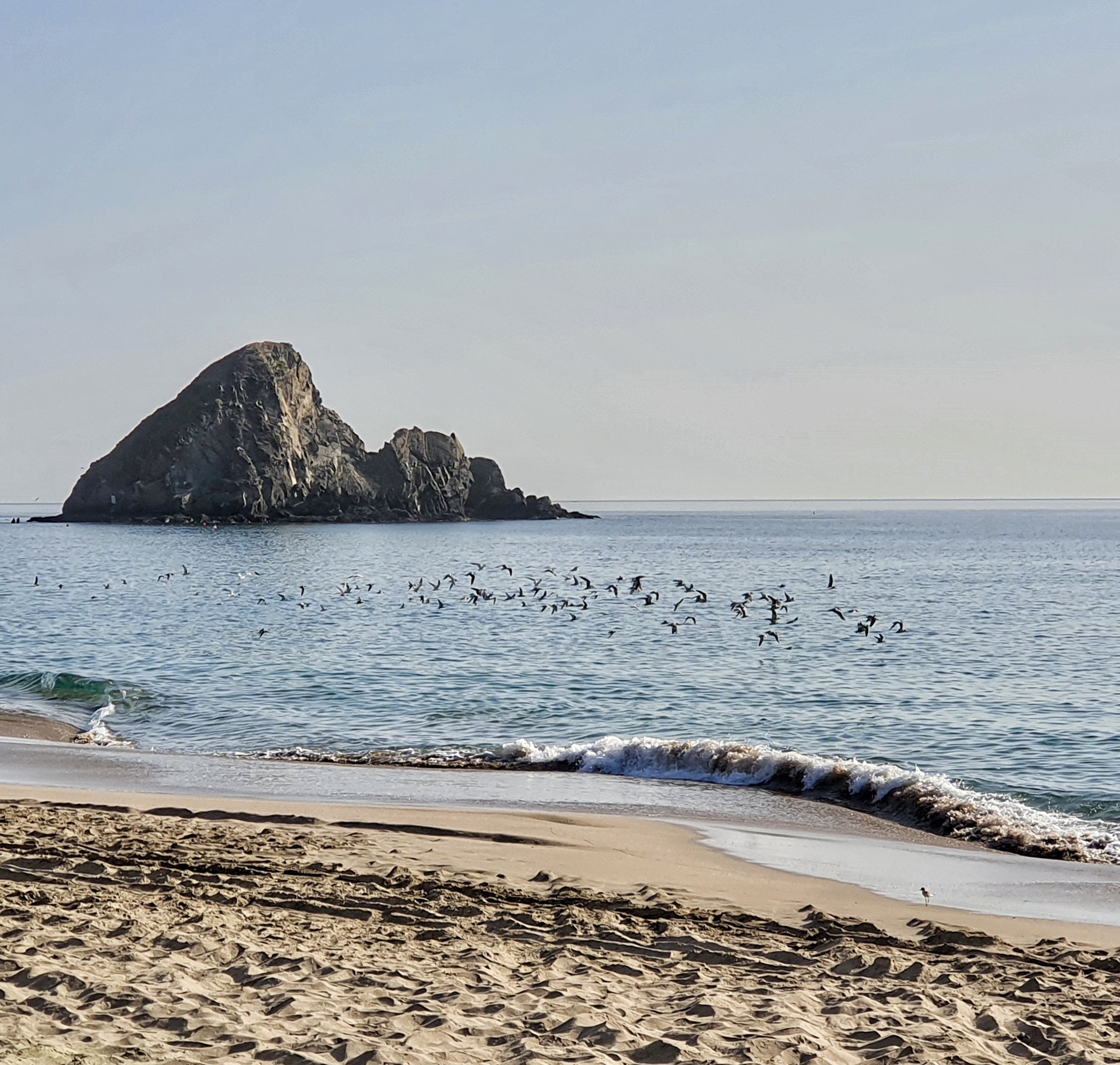
Wildlife around the island
