= 2018 Tour of Guangxi =

Cycling race

2018 UCI World Tour, race 37 of 37

Race details
- Dates: 16–21 October 2018
- Stages: 6
- Distance: 911.4 km (566.3 mi)
- Winning time: 20h 39' 56"

Results
Jersey awarded to the overall winner	Winner	Gianni Moscon (ITA)	(Team Sky)
	Second	Felix Großschartner (AUT)	(Bora–Hansgrohe)
	Third	Sergey Chernetskiy (RUS)	(Astana)

The 2018 Tour of Guangxi was a road cycling stage race that took place between 16 and 21 October 2018 in China. It was the 2nd edition of the Tour of Guangxi and the thirty-seventh event of the 2018 UCI World Tour. It was won by Gianni Moscon of Team Sky.

== Teams ==
Eighteen teams of up to seven riders started the race:

UCI WorldTeams

- AG2R La Mondiale
- BMC Racing Team
- EF Education First–Drapac p/b Cannondale
- LottoNL–Jumbo
- Movistar Team
- Team Sunweb
- Astana
- Bora–Hansgrohe
- Lotto–Soudal
- Quick-Step Floors
- Trek–Segafredo
- Bahrain–Merida
- Team Dimension Data
- Team Katusha–Alpecin
- Mitchelton–Scott
- Team Sky
- UAE Team Emirates
- Groupama–FDJ

== Route ==
Stage characteristics and winners
Stage	Date	Course	Distance	Type	Stage winner
1	16 October	Beihai to Beihai	107.4 km (66.7 mi)	Flat stage	Dylan Groenewegen (NED)
2	17 October	Beihai to Qinzhou	145.2 km (90.2 mi)	Flat stage	Pascal Ackermann (GER)
3	18 October	Nanning to Nanning	125.4 km (77.9 mi)	Flat stage	Fabio Jakobsen (NED)
4	19 October	Nanning to Mashan County	152.2 km (94.6 mi)	Medium mountain stage	Gianni Moscon (ITA)
5	20 October	Liuzhou to Guilin	212.2 km (131.9 mi)	Medium mountain stage	Matteo Trentin (ITA)
6	21 October	Guilin to Guilin	169 km (105 mi)	Medium mountain stage	Fabio Jakobsen (NED)

== General classification ==
Final general classification

Rank	Rider	Team	Time
1	Gianni Moscon (ITA)	Team Sky	20h 39' 56"
2	Felix Großschartner (AUT)	Bora–Hansgrohe	+ 9"
3	Sergey Chernetskiy (RUS)	Astana	+ 14"
4	Rémi Cavagna (FRA)	Quick-Step Floors	+ 17"
5	Carlos Verona (ESP)	Mitchelton–Scott	+ 21"
6	Rigoberto Urán (COL)	EF Education First–Drapac p/b Cannondale	s.t.
7	Rubén Fernández (ESP)	Movistar Team	+ 25"
8	Luis León Sánchez (ESP)	Astana	s.t.
9	Dries Devenyns (BEL)	Quick-Step Floors	+ 27"
10	Natnael Berhane (ERI)	Team Dimension Data	+ 28"
