= Gianni Moscon =

Italian cyclist

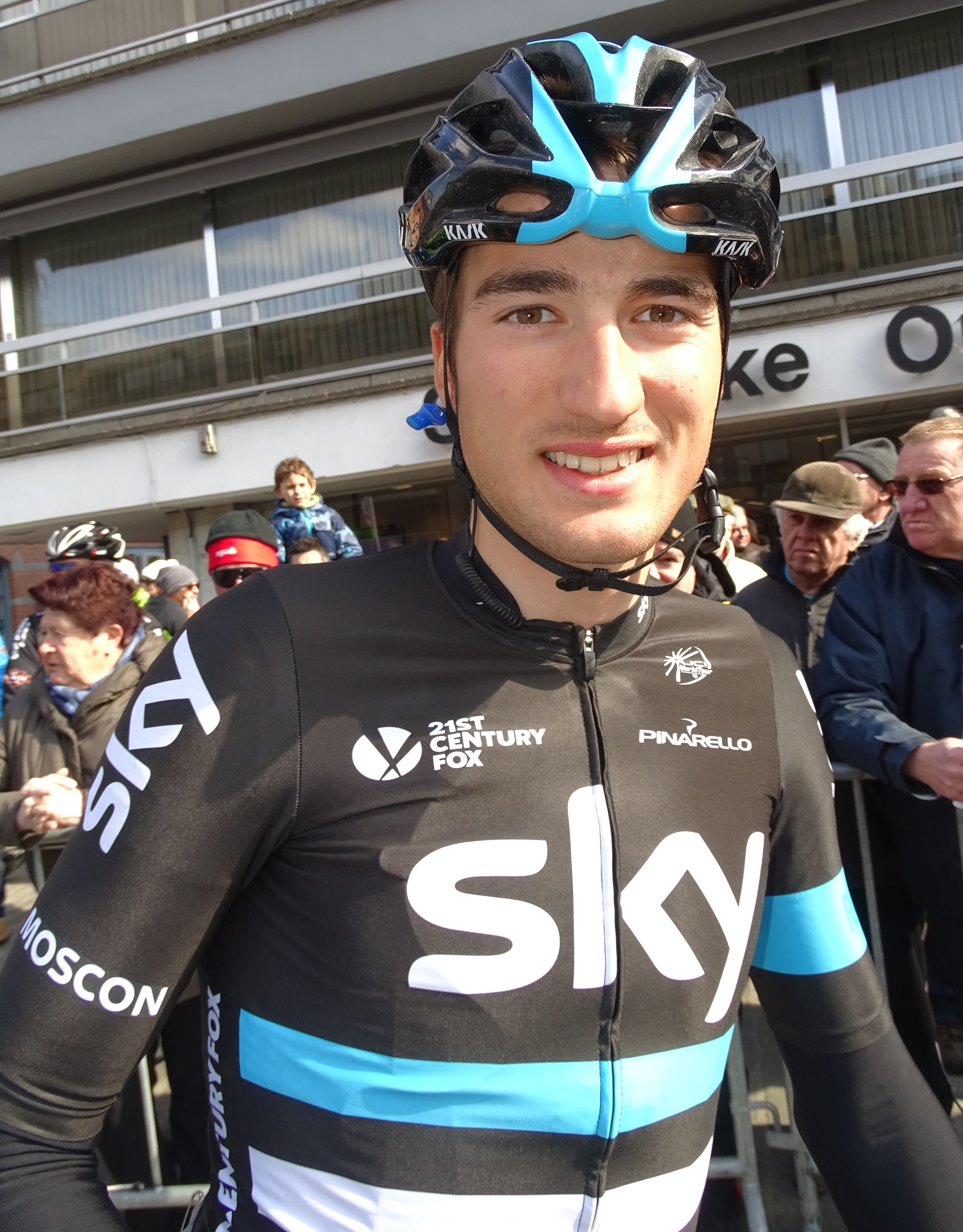
- Moscon at the 2016 Nokere Koerse

Personal information
- Nickname: Il Trattore (The Tractor)
- Born: 20 April 1994 (age 32) Trento, Italy
- Height: 1.82 m (6 ft 0 in)
- Weight: 69 kg (152 lb)

Cycling career
- Sport: Cycling
- Current team: Red Bull–Bora–Hansgrohe
- Discipline: Road
- Role: Rider
- Rider type: Rouleur; Classics specialist

Amateur team
- 2013–2015: Zalf–Euromobil–Désirée–Fior

Professional teams
- 2016–2021: Team Sky
- 2022–2023: Astana Qazaqstan Team
- 2024: Soudal–Quick-Step
- 2025–: Red Bull–Bora–Hansgrohe

Major wins
- Stage races Arctic Race of Norway (2016) Tour of Guangxi (2018) Single-day races and Classics National Time Trial Championships (2017, 2018)

Gianni Moscon (born 20 April 1994) is an Italian professional cyclist who rides for UCI WorldTeam Red Bull–Bora–Hansgrohe. He competed at the 2020 Summer Olympics in the road race.

== Early life and career ==
Moscon grew up in the apple farms north of Trento in Trentino in the north of Italy. This led to him being given the nickname "Il Trattore", which translates to "The Tractor".

== Professional career ==
=== Team Sky (2016–2021) ===
In September 2015, it was announced that he had signed a professional contract with Team Sky for the 2016 season. This followed a recommendation from Fausto Pinarello, of the company who manufacture the team's bicycles, who had seen Moscon winning amateur races and spoke about him to Sky sport director Dario Cioni.

Moscon recorded his first professional victory at the Arctic Race of Norway when he won the queen stage. He later went on to win the general classification, as well as the youth classification. He was named in the startlist for the 2017 Vuelta a España. In July 2018, he was named in the start list for the 2018 Tour de France.

== Controversy ==
=== Racism and suspension ===
During the 2017 Tour de Romandie, Moscon racially abused French cyclist Kévin Reza. He was suspended from racing with Team Sky for six weeks. The team indicated that any further behavioural incidents would result in Moscon's contract being terminated.

Moscon was also accused of purposefully crashing FDJ rider Sébastien Reichenbach during the 2017 Tre Valli Varesine, though the investigation was dropped on the incident due to a lack of evidence, as the crash was not captured on television cameras.

=== 2017 World Championships ===
Moscon was disqualified from the 2017 UCI World Championships Road Race after being towed back to the peloton by the Italian team car following a crash on the penultimate lap. Moscon ultimately bridged to a breakaway with French rider Julian Alaphilippe in the final five kilometers of the race before finishing 29th. Following the race, Moscon was disqualified by race commissaires.

=== 2018 Tour de France incident ===
Moscon was disqualified from the 2018 Tour de France after punching Élie Gesbert of Fortuneo–Samsic during stage 15.

=== 2020 Kuurne–Brussels–Kuurne ===
Moscon was disqualified from the 2020 Kuurne–Brussels–Kuurne after he was caught on camera throwing a bike at another rider after a massive crash in the peloton. Upon finding out he was disqualified, he proceeded to remove his race numbers on camera for which he was fined CHF 500. Rider Jens Debusschere, at whom Moscon had thrown the bike, suffered a cut to his hand and wrist and commented at the finish line: "It’s a series of incidents and it's always the same guy. [...] It’s not only this incident, there’s many more incidents. If you ask around in the peloton about how their relation is with him, then ninety per cent will react negatively."

== Major results ==
2012
4th Overall Giro della Lunigiana
2014
1st Piccolo Giro di Lombardia
2nd GP Capodarco
5th Gran Premio di Poggiana
6th Giro del Belvedere
8th Coppa della Pace
9th Gran Premio Palio del Recioto
10th Trofeo Alcide Degasperi
2015
1st Road race, National Under-23 Road Championships
1st Gran Premio San Giuseppe
1st Trofeo Città di San Vendemiano
1st Coppa dei Laghi-Trofeo Almar
2nd Ronde van Vlaanderen U23
4th Road race, UCI Under-23 Road World Championships
4th Trofeo Banca Popolare di Vicenza
5th Overall Course de la Paix U23
2016 (2 pro wins)
1st Overall Arctic Race of Norway

1st Young rider classification
1st Stage 3

3rd Overall Settimana Internazionale di Coppi e Bartali
National Road Championships

4th Time trial
5th Road race

5th Overall Tour du Poitou-Charentes
6th Grand Prix Cycliste de Montréal
7th Overall Tour de Yorkshire
8th Nokere Koerse
2017 (1)
National Road Championships

1st Time trial
5th Road race

UCI Road World Championships

3rd Team time trial
6th Time trial

3rd Giro di Lombardia
5th Paris–Roubaix
5th Giro dell'Emilia
7th Overall Route du Sud
7th Tre Valli Varesine
2018 (5)
1st Time trial, National Road Championships
1st Overall Tour of Guangxi

1st Young rider classification
1st Stage 4

1st Coppa Ugo Agostoni
1st Giro della Toscana
1st Stage 3 (TTT) Critérium du Dauphiné
2nd Trofeo Serra de Tramuntana
3rd Coppa Sabatini
5th Road race, UCI Road World Championships
8th E3 Harelbeke
8th Trofeo Lloseta–Andratx
2019
4th Road race, UCI Road World Championships
5th Time trial, National Road Championships
6th Overall Tour of Britain
2021 (3)
1st Gran Premio di Lugano
Tour of the Alps

1st Stages 1 & 3

4th Road race, National Road Championships
4th Paris–Roubaix
7th Coppa Sabatini
8th Giro della Toscana
9th Clásica de San Sebastián
2026
1st (TTT) Trofeo Ses Salines

=== Grand Tour general classification results timeline ===
Grand Tour	2017	2018	2019	2020	2021	2022	2023
Giro d'Italia	—	—	—	—	24	—	107
Tour de France	—	DSQ	84	—	—	DNF	135
Vuelta a España	27	—	—	—	—	—	—

=== Classics results timeline ===
Monument	2016	2017	2018	2019	2020	2021	2022	2023
Milan–San Remo	—	49	29	—	33	—	101	—
Tour of Flanders	77	15	21	42	—	—	DNF	—
Paris–Roubaix	38	5	41	84	NH	4	—	36
Liège–Bastogne–Liège	—	78	—	—	—	—	—	—
Giro di Lombardia	—	3	DNF	19	57	DNF	—	

Legend
—	Did not compete
DNF	Did not finish
DSQ	Disqualified
NH	Not held
