= 2024 Tour of Guangxi =

2024 UCI World Tour, race 35 of 35

Race details
- Dates: 15–20 October 2024
- Stages: 6
- Distance: 1,021.8 km (634.9 mi)
- Winning time: 22h 21' 45"

Results
Jersey awarded to the overall winner	Winner	Lennert Van Eetvelt (BEL)	(Lotto–Dstny)
	Second	Oscar Onley (GBR)	(Team dsm–firmenich PostNL)
	Third	Alex Baudin (FRA)	(Decathlon–AG2R La Mondiale)
Jersey awarded to the points classification winner	Points	Ethan Vernon (GBR)	(Israel–Premier Tech)
Jersey awarded to the mountains classification winner	Mountains	Pepijn Reinderink (NED)	(Soudal–Quick-Step)
Jersey awarded to the young rider classification winner	Young rider	Lennert Van Eetvelt (BEL)	(Lotto–Dstny)
	Team	(United Arab Emirates) UAE Team Emirates	

The 2024 Gree-Tour of Guangxi was a road cycling stage race that took place between 15 and 20 October 2024 in the Chinese province of Guangxi. It was the 5th edition of the Tour of Guangxi and the thirty-fifth and final event of the 2024 UCI World Tour.

== Teams ==
Nineteen teams, consisting of sixteen of the eighteen UCI WorldTour teams, two UCI Professional Continental teams and the Chinese national team, participated in the race.

UCI WorldTeams

- Arkéa–B&B Hotels
- Astana Qazaqstan Team
- Cofidis
- Decathlon–AG2R La Mondiale
- EF Education–EasyPost
- INEOS Grenadiers
- Intermarché–Wanty
- Lidl–Trek
- Movistar Team
- Red Bull–Bora–Hansgrohe
- Soudal–Quick-Step
- Team Bahrain Victorious
- Team dsm–firmenich PostNL
- Team Jayco–AlUla
- UAE Team Emirates
- Visma–Lease a Bike

UCI ProTeams

- Israel–Premier Tech
- Lotto–Dstny

National teams

- China

== Route ==
Stage characteristics and winners
Stage	Date	Course	Distance	Type	Stage winner
1	15 October	Fangchenggang to Fangchenggang	149.4 km (92.8 mi)	Flat stage	Lionel Taminiaux (BEL)
2	16 October	Chongzuo to Jingxi	181.5 km (112.8 mi)	Hilly stage	Warre Vangheluwe (BEL)
3	17 October	Jingxi to Bama	214 km (133.0 mi)	Hilly stage	Ethan Vernon (GBR)
4	18 October	Bama to Jinchengjiang	176.8 km (109.9 mi)	Hilly stage	Ethan Vernon (GBR)
5	19 October	Yizhou to Nongla	165.8 km (103.0 mi)	Medium mountain stage	Lennert Van Eetvelt (BEL)
6	20 October	Nanning to Nanning	134.3 km (83.5 mi)	Hilly stage	Matevž Govekar (SLO)
Total			1,021.8 km (634.9 mi)		

== Stages ==
=== Stage 1 ===
15 October 2024 — Fangchenggang to Fangchenggang, 149.4 km (92.8 mi)

Stage 1 result
Rank	Rider	Team	Time
1	Lionel Taminiaux (BEL)	Lotto–Dstny	3h 17' 58"
2	Gijs Van Hoecke (BEL)	Intermarché–Wanty	+ 0"
3	Juan Sebastián Molano (COL)	UAE Team Emirates	+ 0"
4	Ethan Vernon (GBR)	Israel–Premier Tech	+ 0"
5	Max Kanter (GER)	Astana Qazaqstan Team	+ 0"
6	Blake Quick (AUS)	Team Jayco–AlUla	+ 0"
7	Dušan Rajović (SRB)	Team Bahrain Victorious	+ 0"
8	Milan Fretin (BEL)	Cofidis	+ 0"
9	Riley Pickrell (CAN)	Israel–Premier Tech	+ 0"
10	Luke Lamperti (USA)	Soudal–Quick-Step	+ 0"

General classification after Stage 1
Rank	Rider	Team	Time
1	Lionel Taminiaux (BEL)	Lotto–Dstny	3h 17' 48"
2	Gijs Van Hoecke (BEL)	Intermarché–Wanty	+ 4"
3	Stan Dewulf (BEL)	Decathlon–AG2R La Mondiale	+ 5"
4	Rune Herregodts (BEL)	Intermarché–Wanty	+ 5"
5	Juan Sebastián Molano (COL)	UAE Team Emirates	+ 6"
6	Jhonatan Narváez (ECU)	INEOS Grenadiers	+ 9"
7	Robert Stannard (AUS)	Team Bahrain Victorious	+ 9"
8	Ethan Vernon (GBR)	Israel–Premier Tech	+ 10"
9	Max Kanter (GER)	Astana Qazaqstan Team	+ 10"
10	Blake Quick (AUS)	Team Jayco–AlUla	+ 10"

=== Stage 2 ===
16 October 2024 — Chongzuo to Jingxi, 181.5 km (112.8 mi)

Stage 2 result
Rank	Rider	Team	Time
1	Warre Vangheluwe (BEL)	Soudal–Quick-Step	3h 49' 29"
2	Max Kanter (GER)	Astana Qazaqstan Team	+ 0"
3	Jake Stewart (GBR)	Israel–Premier Tech	+ 0"
4	Alberto Bruttomesso (ITA)	Team Bahrain Victorious	+ 0"
5	Matevž Govekar (SLO)	Team Bahrain Victorious	+ 0"
6	Davide Cimolai (ITA)	Movistar Team	+ 0"
7	Ethan Vernon (GBR)	Israel–Premier Tech	+ 0"
8	Juan Sebastián Molano (COL)	UAE Team Emirates	+ 0"
9	Gijs Van Hoecke (BEL)	Intermarché–Wanty	+ 0"
10	Natnael Tesfatsion (ERI)	Lidl–Trek	+ 0"

General classification after Stage 1
Rank	Rider	Team	Time
1	Max Kanter (GER)	Astana Qazaqstan Team	7h 07' 21"
2	Gijs Van Hoecke (BEL)	Intermarché–Wanty	+ 0"
3	Stan Dewulf (BEL)	Decathlon–AG2R La Mondiale	+ 1"
4	Filip Maciejuk (POL)	Red Bull–Bora–Hansgrohe	+ 1"
5	Dries De Bondt (BEL)	Decathlon–AG2R La Mondiale	+ 1"
6	Rune Herregodts (BEL)	Intermarché–Wanty	+ 1"
7	Juan Sebastián Molano (COL)	UAE Team Emirates	+ 2"
8	Jake Stewart (GBR)	Israel–Premier Tech	+ 2"
9	Robert Stannard (AUS)	Team Bahrain Victorious	+ 5"
10	Martin Svrček (SVK)	Soudal–Quick-Step	+ 5"

=== Stage 3 ===
17 October 2024 — Jingxi to Bama, 214 km (133.0 mi)

Stage 3 result
Rank	Rider	Team	Time
1	Ethan Vernon (GBR)	Israel–Premier Tech	4h 44' 04"
2	Juan Sebastián Molano (COL)	UAE Team Emirates	+ 0"
3	Riley Pickrell (CAN)	Israel–Premier Tech	+ 0"
4	Milan Fretin (BEL)	Cofidis	+ 0"
5	Marijn van den Berg (NED)	EF Education–EasyPost	+ 0"
6	Luke Lamperti (USA)	Soudal–Quick-Step	+ 0"
7	Gijs Van Hoecke (BEL)	Intermarché–Wanty	+ 0"
8	Max Kanter (GER)	Astana Qazaqstan Team	+ 0"
9	Davide Cimolai (ITA)	Movistar Team	+ 0"
10	Iván García Cortina (ESP)	Movistar Team	+ 0"

General classification after Stage 3
Rank	Rider	Team	Time
1	Ethan Vernon (GBR)	Israel–Premier Tech	11h 51' 21"
2	Juan Sebastián Molano (COL)	UAE Team Emirates	+ 0"
3	Dries De Bondt (BEL)	Decathlon–AG2R La Mondiale	+ 2"
4	Max Kanter (GER)	Astana Qazaqstan Team	+ 4"
5	Gijs Van Hoecke (BEL)	Intermarché–Wanty	+ 4"
6	Stan Dewulf (BEL)	Decathlon–AG2R La Mondiale	+ 5"
7	Filip Maciejuk (POL)	Red Bull–Bora–Hansgrohe	+ 5"
8	Rune Herregodts (BEL)	Intermarché–Wanty	+ 5"
9	Jake Stewart (GBR)	Israel–Premier Tech	+ 6"
10	Robert Stannard (AUS)	Team Bahrain Victorious	+ 8"

=== Stage 4 ===
18 October 2024 — Bama to Jinchengjiang, 176.8 km (109.9 mi)

Stage 4 result
Rank	Rider	Team	Time
1	Ethan Vernon (GBR)	Israel–Premier Tech	4h 02' 11"
2	Max Kanter (GER)	Astana Qazaqstan Team	+ 0"
3	Alberto Bruttomesso (ITA)	Team Bahrain Victorious	+ 0"
4	Lionel Taminiaux (BEL)	Lotto–Dstny	+ 0"
5	Mick van Dijke (NED)	Visma–Lease a Bike	+ 0"
6	Davide Cimolai (ITA)	Movistar Team	+ 0"
7	Riley Pickrell (CAN)	Israel–Premier Tech	+ 0"
8	Niklas Märkl (GER)	Team dsm–firmenich PostNL	+ 0"
9	Matevž Govekar (SLO)	Team Bahrain Victorious	+ 0"
10	Gijs Van Hoecke (BEL)	Intermarché–Wanty	+ 0"

General classification after Stage 4
Rank	Rider	Team	Time
1	Max Kanter (GER)	Astana Qazaqstan Team	15h 53' 30"
2	Stan Dewulf (BEL)	Decathlon–AG2R La Mondiale	+ 1"
3	Juan Sebastián Molano (COL)	UAE Team Emirates	+ 2"
4	Dries De Bondt (BEL)	Decathlon–AG2R La Mondiale	+ 4"
5	Gijs Van Hoecke (BEL)	Intermarché–Wanty	+ 6"
6	Filip Maciejuk (POL)	Red Bull–Bora–Hansgrohe	+ 7"
7	Rune Herregodts (BEL)	Intermarché–Wanty	+ 7"
8	Jake Stewart (GBR)	Israel–Premier Tech	+ 8"
9	Alberto Bruttomesso (ITA)	Team Bahrain Victorious	+ 8"
10	Robert Stannard (AUS)	Team Bahrain Victorious	+ 10"

=== Stage 5 ===
19 October 2024 — Yizhou to Nongla, 165.8 km (103.0 mi)

Stage 5 result
Rank	Rider	Team	Time
1	Lennert Van Eetvelt (BEL)	Lotto–Dstny	3h 36' 18"
2	Oscar Onley (GBR)	Team dsm–firmenich PostNL	+ 2"
3	Alex Baudin (FRA)	Decathlon–AG2R La Mondiale	+ 9"
4	Victor Lafay (FRA)	Decathlon–AG2R La Mondiale	+ 9"
5	Pavel Sivakov (FRA)	UAE Team Emirates	+ 11"
6	Giovanni Aleotti (ITA)	Red Bull–Bora–Hansgrohe	+ 15"
7	Lorenzo Fortunato (ITA)	Astana Qazaqstan Team	+ 23"
8	Ewen Costiou (FRA)	Arkéa–B&B Hotels	+ 25"
9	Welay Berhe (ETH)	Team Jayco–AlUla	+ 26"
10	Felix Großschartner (AUT)	UAE Team Emirates	+ 26"

General classification after Stage 5
Rank	Rider	Team	Time
1	Lennert Van Eetvelt (BEL)	Lotto–Dstny	19h 29' 50"
2	Oscar Onley (GBR)	Team dsm–firmenich PostNL	+ 5"
3	Alex Baudin (FRA)	Decathlon–AG2R La Mondiale	+ 15"
4	Victor Lafay (FRA)	Decathlon–AG2R La Mondiale	+ 19"
5	Pavel Sivakov (FRA)	UAE Team Emirates	+ 21"
6	Giovanni Aleotti (ITA)	Red Bull–Bora–Hansgrohe	+ 25"
7	Lorenzo Fortunato (ITA)	Astana Qazaqstan Team	+ 33"
8	Ewen Costiou (FRA)	Arkéa–B&B Hotels	+ 35"
9	Quinn Simmons (USA)	Lidl–Trek	+ 36"
10	Felix Großschartner (AUT)	UAE Team Emirates	+ 36"

=== Stage 6 ===
20 October 2024 — Nanning to Nanning, 134.3 km (83.5 mi)

Stage 6 result
Rank	Rider	Team	Time
1	Matevž Govekar (SLO)	Team Bahrain Victorious	2h 51' 55"
2	Marijn van den Berg (NED)	EF Education–EasyPost	+ 0"
3	Robert Stannard (AUS)	Team Bahrain Victorious	+ 0"
4	Joseph Blackmore (GBR)	Israel–Premier Tech	+ 0"
5	Matis Louvel (FRA)	Arkéa–B&B Hotels	+ 0"
6	Stan Dewulf (BEL)	Decathlon–AG2R La Mondiale	+ 0"
7	Natnael Tesfatsion (ERI)	Lidl–Trek	+ 0"
8	Martin Svrček (SVK)	Soudal–Quick-Step	+ 0"
9	Alex Baudin (FRA)	Decathlon–AG2R La Mondiale	+ 0"
10	Rune Herregodts (BEL)	Intermarché–Wanty	+ 0"

General classification after Stage 6
Rank	Rider	Team	Time
1	Lennert Van Eetvelt (BEL)	Lotto–Dstny	22h 21' 45"
2	Oscar Onley (GBR)	Team dsm–firmenich PostNL	+ 5"
3	Alex Baudin (FRA)	Decathlon–AG2R La Mondiale	+ 15"
4	Victor Lafay (FRA)	Decathlon–AG2R La Mondiale	+ 19"
5	Pavel Sivakov (FRA)	UAE Team Emirates	+ 21"
6	Giovanni Aleotti (ITA)	Red Bull–Bora–Hansgrohe	+ 25"
7	Tim Wellens (BEL)	UAE Team Emirates	+ 31"
8	Lorenzo Fortunato (ITA)	Astana Qazaqstan Team	+ 33"
9	Ewen Costiou (FRA)	Arkéa–B&B Hotels	+ 35"
10	Quinn Simmons (USA)	Lidl–Trek	+ 36"

== Classification leadership ==
Classification leadership by stage
Stage	Winner	General classification	Points classification	Mountains classification	Young rider classification	Team classification
1	Lionel Taminiaux	Lionel Taminiaux	Lionel Taminiaux	not awarded	Ethan Vernon	Israel–Premier Tech
2	Warre Vangheluwe	Max Kanter	Max Kanter	Dries De Bondt	Filip Maciejuk	Israel–Premier Tech
3	Ethan Vernon	Ethan Vernon	Ethan Vernon	Dries De Bondt	Ethan Vernon	Israel–Premier Tech
4	Ethan Vernon	Max Kanter	Ethan Vernon	Pepijn Reinderink	Filip Maciejuk	Israel–Premier Tech
5	Lennert Van Eetvelt	Lennert Van Eetvelt	Ethan Vernon	Pepijn Reinderink	Lennert Van Eetvelt	UAE Team Emirates
6	Matevž Govekar	Lennert Van Eetvelt	Ethan Vernon	Pepijn Reinderink	Lennert Van Eetvelt	UAE Team Emirates
Final		Lennert Van Eetvelt	Ethan Vernon	Pepijn Reinderink	Lennert Van Eetvelt	UAE Team Emirates

== Classification standings ==
Legend
General classification	Denotes the leader of the general classification	Mountain classification	Denotes the leader of the mountains classification
Points classification	Denotes the leader of the points classification	Young rider classification	Denotes the leader of the Young rider classification

=== General classification ===
Final general classification (1–10)
Rank	Rider	Team	Time
1	Lennert van Eetvelt (BEL)	Lotto–Dstny	22h 21' 45"
2	Oscar Onley (GBR)	Team dsm–firmenich PostNL	+ 5"
3	Alex Baudin (FRA)	Decathlon–AG2R La Mondiale	+ 15"
4	Victor Lafay (FRA)	Decathlon–AG2R La Mondiale	+ 19"
5	Pavel Sivakov (FRA)	UAE Team Emirates	+ 21"
6	Giovanni Aleotti (ITA)	Red Bull–Bora–Hansgrohe	+ 25"
7	Tim Wellens (BEL)	UAE Team Emirates	+ 31"
8	Lorenzo Fortunato (ITA)	Astana Qazaqstan Team	+ 33"
9	Ewen Costiou (FRA)	Arkéa–B&B Hotels	+ 35"
10	Quinn Simmons (USA)	Lidl–Trek	+ 36"

=== Points classification ===
Final points classification (1–10)
Rank	Rider	Team	Points
1	Ethan Vernon (GBR)	Israel–Premier Tech	38
2	Stan Dewulf (BEL)	Decathlon–AG2R La Mondiale	37
3	Max Kanter (GER)	Astana Qazaqstan Team	29
4	Warre Vangheluwe (BEL)	Soudal–Quick-Step	27
5	Matevž Govekar (SLO)	Team Bahrain Victorious	23
6	Lionel Taminiaux (BEL)	Lotto–Dstny	22
7	Juan Sebastián Molano (COL)	UAE Team Emirates	21
8	Gijs Van Hoecke (BEL)	Intermarché–Wanty	17
9	Dries De Bondt (BEL)	Decathlon–AG2R La Mondiale	16
10	Marijn van den Berg (NED)	EF Education–EasyPost	16

=== Mountains classification ===
Final mountains classification (1–10)
Rank	Rider	Team	Points
1	Pepijn Reinderink (NED)	Soudal–Quick-Step	28
2	Tim Wellens (BEL)	UAE Team Emirates	22
3	Stan Dewulf (BEL)	Decathlon–AG2R La Mondiale	17
4	Victor Lafay (FRA)	Decathlon–AG2R La Mondiale	16
5	Dries De Bondt (BEL)	Decathlon–AG2R La Mondiale	14
6	Pavel Sivakov (FRA)	UAE Team Emirates	12
7	Lennert van Eetvelt (BEL)	Lotto–Dstny	10
8	Sylvain Moniquet (BEL)	Lotto–Dstny	10
9	Rémi Cavagna (FRA)	Movistar Team	8
10	Thomas Champion (FRA)	Cofidis	5

=== Young rider classification ===
Final young rider classification (1–10)
Rank	Rider	Team	Time
1	Lennert van Eetvelt (BEL)	Lotto–Dstny	22h 21' 45"
2	Oscar Onley (GBR)	Team dsm–firmenich PostNL	+ 5"
3	Alex Baudin (FRA)	Decathlon–AG2R La Mondiale	+ 15"
4	Giovanni Aleotti (ITA)	Red Bull–Bora–Hansgrohe	+ 25"
5	Ewen Costiou (FRA)	Arkéa–B&B Hotels	+ 35"
6	Quinn Simmons (USA)	Lidl–Trek	+ 36"
7	Welay Berhe (ETH)	Team Jayco–AlUla	+ 36"
8	Alexander Hajek (AUT)	Red Bull–Bora–Hansgrohe	+ 43"
9	Johannes Staune-Mittet (NOR)	Visma–Lease a Bike	+ 43"
10	Max Poole (GBR)	Team dsm–firmenich PostNL	+ 1' 02"

=== Team classification ===
Final team classification (1–10)
Rank	Team	Time
1	(United Arab Emirates) UAE Team Emirates	67h 06' 48"
2	(France) Decathlon–AG2R La Mondiale	+ 42"
3	(Germany) Red Bull–Bora–Hansgrohe	+ 1' 06"
4	(United States) Lidl–Trek	+ 1' 24"
5	(France) Arkéa–B&B Hotels	+ 2' 24"
6	(Belgium) Lotto–Dstny	+ 3' 03"
7	(Belgium) Intermarché–Wanty	+ 4' 03"
8	(Netherlands) Visma–Lease a Bike	+ 4' 11"
9	(United States) EF Education–EasyPost	+ 4' 17"
10	(Belgium) Soudal–Quick-Step	+ 4' 18"
