= Al Aqah =

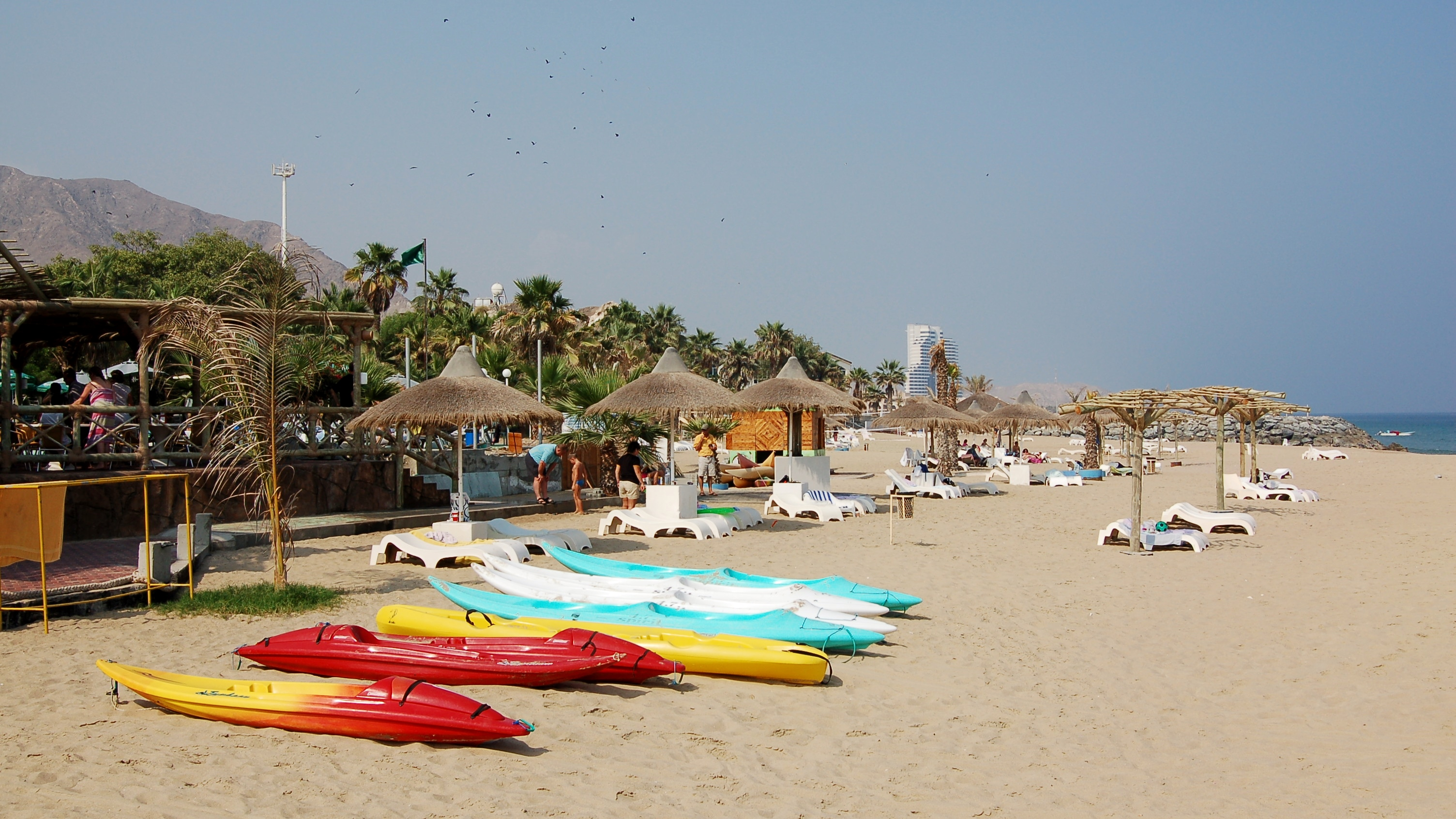

- Location within United Arab Emirates
- Coordinates: 25.4940°N 56.3572°E
- Country: United Arab Emirates
- Emirate: (Emirate of Fujairah) Fujairah

Al Aqah (Arabic: العقة) is a coastal town located in the Emirate of Fujairah, United Arab Emirates. The area is located 50 km (31 mi) north of the city of Fujairah and directly overlooks the Gulf of Oman.

Al Aqah is a popular tourist destination due to the presence of Al Aqah Marine Reserve, Al Aqah beach, and marine activities near Snoopy Island.

Lying about 200 m (660 ft) off Al Aqah's Sandy Beach, Snoopy Island is a rocky islet that serves as a popular shore-diving and snorkelling site, with a maximum depth of around 7 m (23 ft). Its surrounding waters host marine life such as trumpetfish, parrotfish, redtoothed triggerfish and turtles.
