= Daniel Oss =

Italian racing cyclist

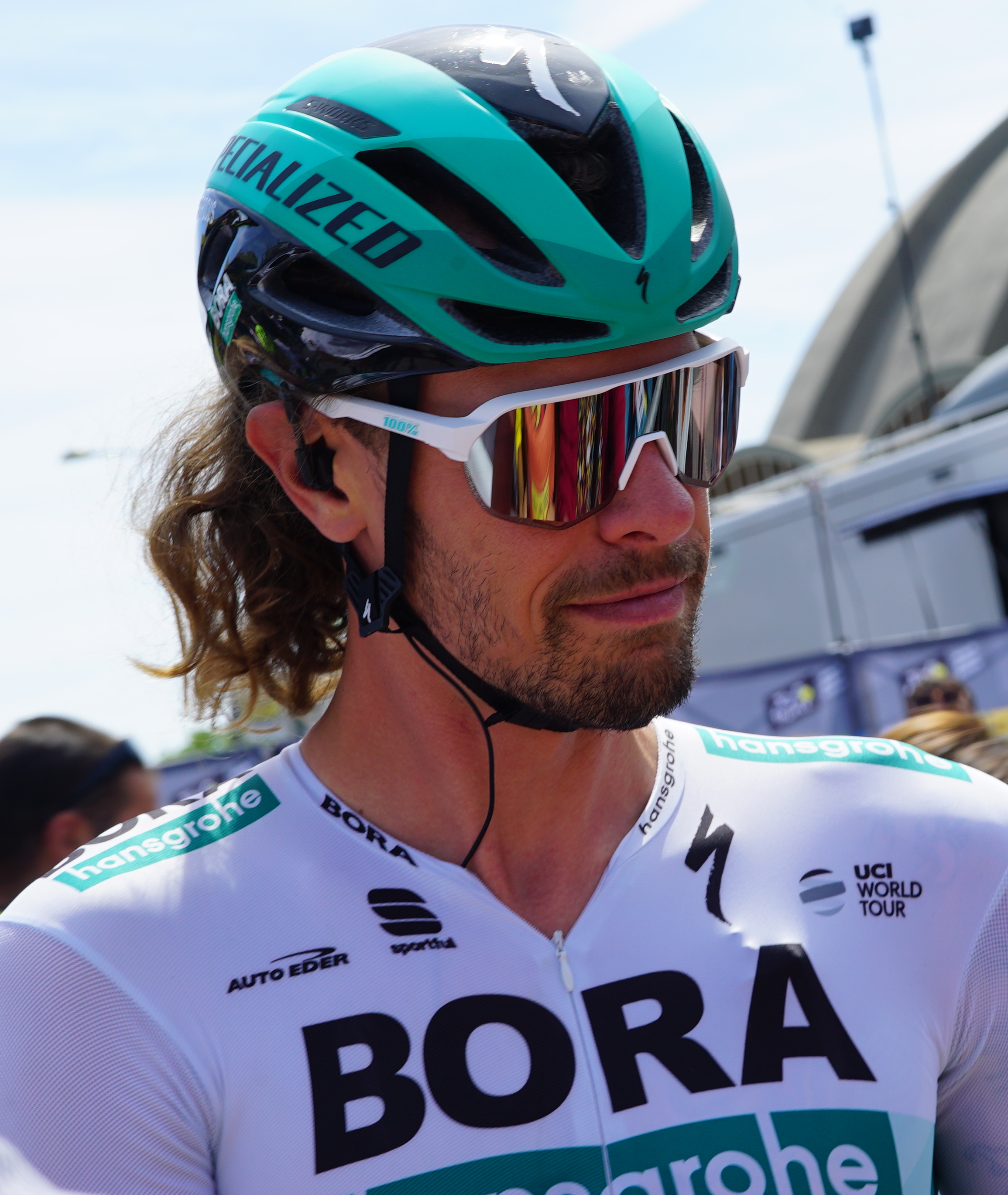
- Oss in 2019

Personal information
- Full name: Daniel Oss
- Born: 13 January 1987 (age 39) Trento, Italy
- Height: 1.90 m (6 ft 3 in)
- Weight: 75 kg (165 lb; 11 st 11 lb)

Cycling career
- Sport: Cycling
- Current team: Specialized Gravel
- Disciplines: Road (former); Track (former); Gravel
- Role: Rider
- Rider type: Classics specialist; Domestique

Amateur teams
- 2007–2008: Zalf–Désirée–Fior
- 2024–: Specialized Gravel

Professional teams
- 2009–2012: Liquigas
- 2013–2017: BMC Racing Team
- 2018–2021: Bora–Hansgrohe
- 2022–2023: Team TotalEnergies

Major wins
- Grand Tours Tour de France 1 TTT stage (2015) Vuelta a España 1 TTT stage (2017)
Medal record
Men's road bicycle racing
Representing BMC Racing Team
World Championships
Gold medal – first place	2014 Ponferrada	Team time trial
Gold medal – first place	2015 Richmond	Team time trial
Silver medal – second place	2016 Doha	Team time trial
Silver medal – second place	2017 Bergen	Team time trial
Men's gravel cycling
Representing Italy
World Championships
Silver medal – second place	2022 Veneto	Elite

Daniel Oss (born 13 January 1987) is an Italian cyclist, who competes in gravel cycling for the Specialized Gravel team.

Between 2009 and 2023, Oss competed professionally in road bicycle racing, with Liquigas–Cannondale, the BMC Racing Team, Bora–Hansgrohe and Team TotalEnergies. He took two individual victories in his road racing career – the 2010 Giro del Veneto and a stage at the 2011 USA Pro Cycling Challenge – and also formed part of winning teams on team time trial stages at the 2015 Tour de France and the 2017 Vuelta a España, as well as winning gold medals in the equivalent event at the UCI Road World Championships in 2014 and 2015.

== Career ==
=== Junior and amateur career (2004–2008) ===
In 2004, the first results on the track and road for Trento-born Oss were outstanding: he excelled in the National Student Track Championships in Pordenone, collecting three podiums in the pursuit, and in the same year, he gained third place in the Madison at the European Student Championships in Fiorenzuola d'Arda.

After a year in the dark, Oss returned to the limelight in 2006 winning five races including events at Ponton, Isola Vicentina, Pessina Cremonese and Bibano di Godega. In 2007, he won two smaller competitions while in 2008, besides three other competitions, he also participated in the World Championships in Varese, coming home in eighth place in the under-23 road race, five seconds behind the winner Fabio Duarte.

=== Liquigas (2009–2012) ===
In 2009, Oss turned professional, joining the Liquigas team; he entered the top 10 for the first time in a professional race during the Tour of Catalunya, it was in the prologue, in which he finished ninth place, four seconds detached from the winner Thor Hushovd. During the same year, he participated in the National Track Championships and came first in the team pursuit along with companions Jacopo Guarnieri, Elia Viviani and Davide Cimolai. Towards the end of the season, he was able to finish in the top five of a number of professional races: two fourth places in stages of the Tour of Missouri, and fifth in the Gran Premio Industria e Commercio di Prato.

In 2010, Oss came fifth in Gent–Wevelgem, and fourth in one of the stages of the Three Days of De Panne. He was also involved in his first ever Grand Tour when he came 124th in the Tour de France, he also won the combativity award on Stage 18, for his involvement in the breakaway. The following year, he played a key role as a lead out man for sprinter and teammate Elia Viviani in the inaugural USA Pro Cycling Challenge. It was Oss's lead-outs that secured Viviani two stage victories and the green jersey for the points classification. On Stage 6 into Denver, Viviani rewarded Oss's hard work by allowing him to win the sprint finish. In his final season with Liquigas–Cannondale, he finished third at the Gran Premio Industria e Commercio Artigianato Carnaghese, and ninth at Milan–San Remo.

=== Post-Liquigas (2013–2023) ===
Oss left Liquigas–Cannondale at the end of the 2012 season, and joined the BMC Racing Team for the 2013 season. During his five years with the team, Oss won four medals at the UCI Road World Championships in the team time trial, including gold medals in 2014 and 2015. He also won seven team time trials at stage races, including at Grand Tour level – at the 2015 Tour de France and the 2017 Vuelta a España. Individually, Oss won the mountains classification at the 2015 Tour of California and the 2017 Tour of Guangxi, and finished third at the 2013 E3 Harelbeke.

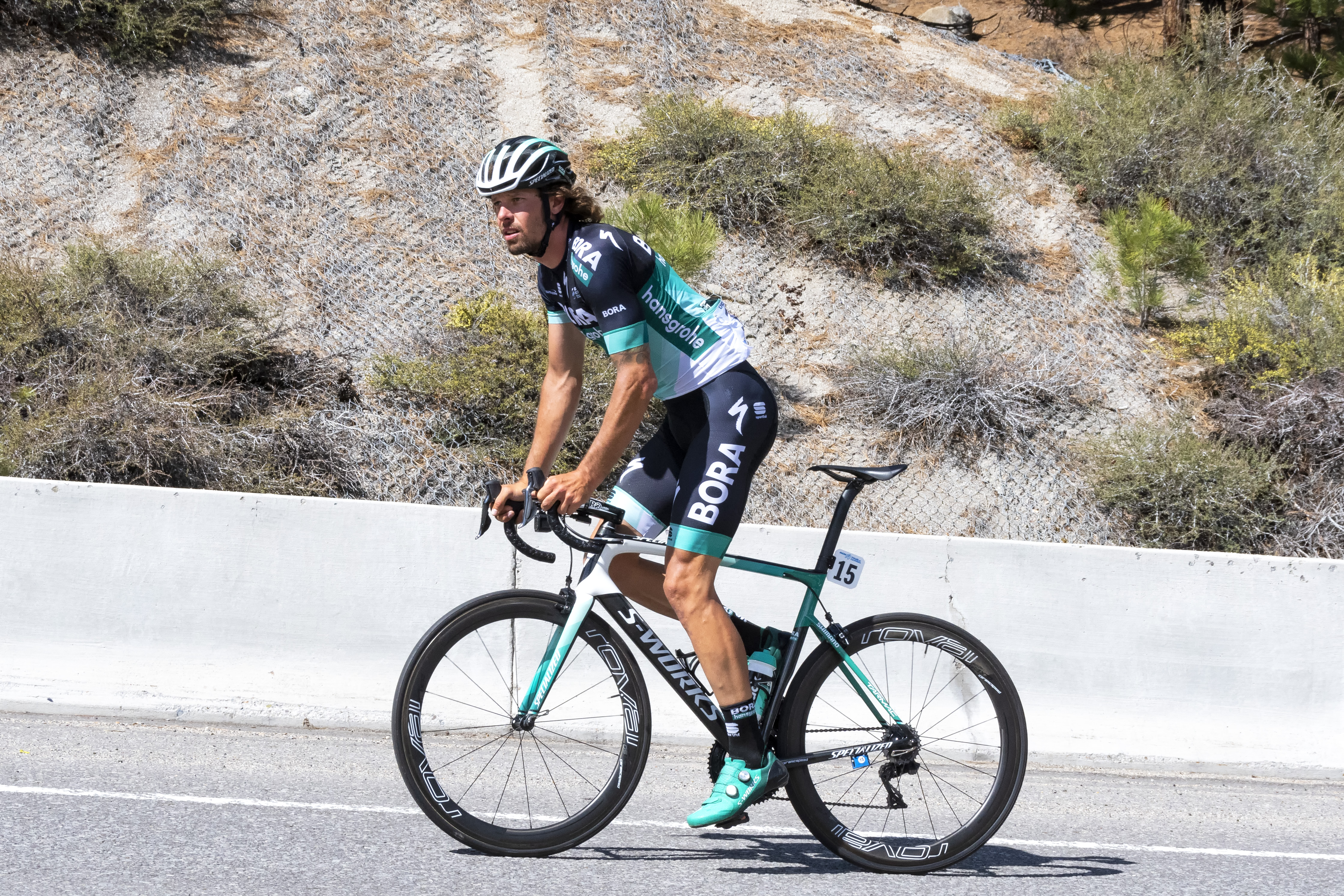
Oss at the 2018 Tour of California, during his first season with Bora–Hansgrohe

He moved to Bora–Hansgrohe for 2018, spending four years with the team – primarily being utilised as a domestique for Peter Sagan. Oss and Sagan both moved to Team TotalEnergies in 2022, with Oss winning a silver medal in the inaugural UCI Gravel World Championships held in Italy, having spent 150 kilometres (93 miles) in an attacking move with the eventual winner, Gianni Vermeersch.

=== Move to gravel racing ===
In November 2023, Oss shifted his focus to gravel cycling with the Specialized Gravel team.

== Major results ==
2004
1st Individual pursuit, National Junior Track Championships
2nd Time trial, National Junior Road Championships
2006
1st Individual pursuit, National Track Championships
2007
1st Circuito di Bibano
2008
2nd Gran Premio di Poggiana
2nd GP Industria del Cuoio e delle Pelli
3rd Time trial, National Under-23 Road Championships
6th Trofeo Alcide Degasperi
8th Road race, UCI Under-23 Road World Championships
8th Trofeo Zsšdi
8th Giro del Belvedere
10th Trofeo Franco Balestra
2009
1st Individual pursuit, National Track Championships
5th Gran Premio Industria e Commercio di Prato
2010 (1 pro win)
1st Giro del Veneto
5th Gent–Wevelgem
6th Overall Giro della Provincia di Reggio Calabria

1st Yong rider classification

10th Overall Tour of Oman
2011 (1)
1st Stage 6 USA Pro Cycling Challenge
3rd Overall Giro della Provincia di Reggio Calabria

1st Young rider classification

6th Coppa Agostoni
2012
3rd Gran Premio Industria e Commercio Artigianato Carnaghese
9th Milan–San Remo
2013
3rd E3 Harelbeke
4th Overall Tour de Wallonie
2014
1st Team time trial, UCI Road World Championships
1st Stage 1 (TTT) Giro del Trentino
2015
1st Team time trial, UCI Road World Championships
1st Stage 9 (TTT) Tour de France
1st Stage 3 (TTT) Critérium du Dauphiné
1st Mountains classification, Tour of California
8th Gent–Wevelgem
10th E3 Harelbeke
2016
1st Stage 1 (TTT) Tirreno–Adriatico
1st Stage 5 (TTT) Eneco Tour
2nd Team time trial, UCI Road World Championships
10th E3 Harelbeke
2017
Vuelta a España

1st Stage 1 (TTT)
Held after Stages 1–2

1st Stage 1 (TTT) Tirreno–Adriatico
1st Mountains classification, Tour of Guangxi
2nd Team time trial, UCI Road World Championships
2018
5th Road race, National Road Championships
2020
Combativity award Stage 7 Tour de France
2022
2nd UCI Gravel World Championships
6th Overall Saudi Tour
2023
Combativity award Stage 11 Tour de France

=== Grand Tour general classification results timeline ===
Grand Tour	2010	2011	2012	2013	2014	2015	2016	2017	2018	2019	2020	2021	2022	2023
Giro d'Italia	—	—	—	140	103	—	111	—	—	—	—	112	—	—
Tour de France	124	100	105	—	69	97	—	—	112	89	105	115	DNF	88
Vuelta a España	—	—	—	—	—	—	—	DNF	—	—	—	—	—	—

Legend
—	Did not compete
DNF	Did not finish
