= Montbrison-sur-Lez =

- Commune
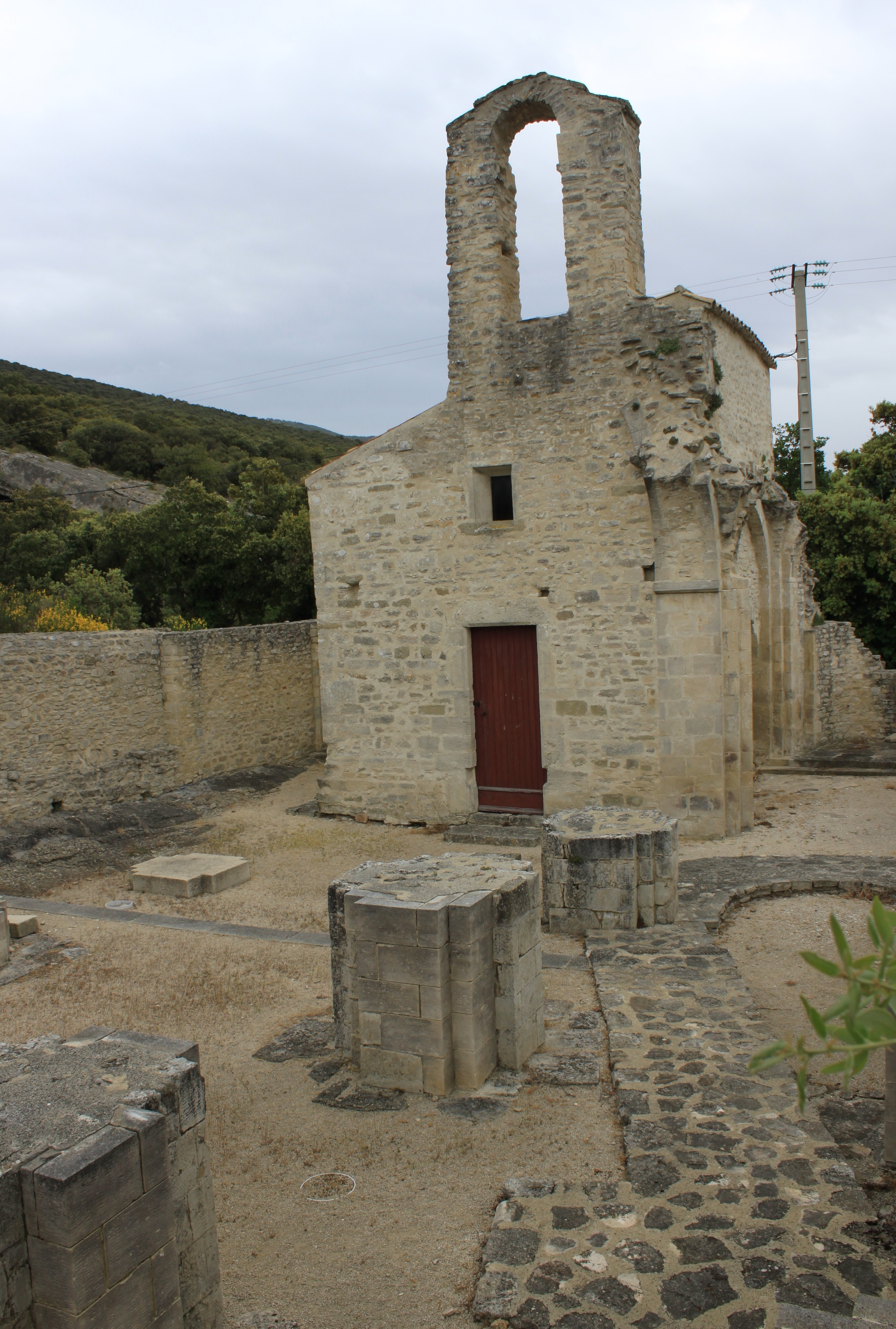
- The priory of Montbrison-sur-Lez
- Location of Montbrison-sur-Lez
- Location within France Location within Auvergne-Rhône-Alpes
- Coordinates: 44°26′16″N 5°01′13″E
- Country: France
- Region: Auvergne-Rhône-Alpes
- Department: Drôme
- Arrondissement: Nyons
- Canton: Grignan

Government
  - Mayor (2020–2026): Patrice Mery
- Area^{1}: 12.83 km^{2} (4.95 sq mi)
- Highest elevation: 744 m (2,441 ft)
- Lowest elevation: 249 m (817 ft)
- Population (2023): 267
  - Density: 20.8/km^{2} (53.9/sq mi)
- Time zone: UTC+01:00 (CET)
  - Summer (DST): UTC+02:00 (CEST)
- INSEE/Postal code: 26192 /26770
- ^{1} French Land Register data, which excludes lakes, ponds, glaciers > 1 km^{2} (0.386 sq mi or 247 acres) and river estuaries.

Montbrison-sur-Lez is a commune in the Drôme department in southeastern France.

== Population ==
Historical population
Year	Pop.	±% p.a.
1968	208	—
1975	198	−0.70%
1982	258	+3.85%
1990	266	+0.38%
1999	312	+1.79%
2007	310	−0.08%
2012	304	−0.39%
2017	281	−1.56%
2023	267	−0.85%
Source: INSEE

== See also ==
- Communes of the Drôme department
