= 2016 ONE Pro Cycling season =

ONE Pro Cycling
- 2016 season
- UCI code: ONE
- Status: UCI Professional Continental
- Manager: Becky Frewing
- Based: United Kingdom
- Bicycles: Factor Bikes

Season victories
- One-day races: 3
- Stage race overall: 1
- Stage race stages: 9

The 2016 season for the ONE Pro Cycling cycling team began in January at the New Zealand Cycle Classic. ONE Pro is a British-registered UCI Professional Continental cycling team that participated in road bicycle racing events on the UCI Continental Circuits and when selected as a wildcard to UCI WorldTour events.

== Team roster ==
As of 1 January 2016.

Rider	Date of birth
Yanto Barker (GBR)	6 January 1980 (aged 35)
Tom Baylis (GBR)	3 January 1996 (aged 19)
Marcin Białobłocki (POL)	2 September 1983 (aged 32)
Karol Domagalski (POL)	9 August 1989 (aged 26)
John Ebsen (DEN)	15 November 1988 (aged 27)
Matthew Goss (AUS)	5 November 1986 (aged 29)
Richard Handley (GBR)	1 September 1990 (aged 25)
George Harper (GBR)	10 July 1992 (aged 23)
Kristian House (GBR)	6 October 1979 (aged 36)
Joshua Hunt (GBR)	3 April 1991 (aged 24)

Rider	Date of birth
Sebastian Lander (DEN)	11 March 1991 (aged 24)
Hayden McCormick (NZL)	1 January 1994 (aged 22)
Martin Mortensen (DEN)	5 November 1984 (aged 31)
Chris Opie (GBR)	22 July 1987 (aged 28)
James Oram (NZL)	17 June 1993 (aged 22)
Glenn O'Shea (AUS)	14 June 1989 (aged 26)
Dion Smith (NZL)	3 March 1993 (aged 22)
Steele Von Hoff (AUS)	31 December 1987 (aged 28)
Peter Williams (GBR)	13 December 1986 (aged 29)
Samuel Williams (GBR)	18 March 1994 (aged 21)

Riders who joined the team for the 2016 season

Rider	2015 team
Karol Domagalski	Team Raleigh
John Ebsen	Androni Giocattoli–Sidermec
Matthew Goss	MTN–Qhubeka
Richard Handley	JLT–Condor
Kristian House	JLT–Condor
Sebastian Lander	Team TreFor–Blue Water
Hayden McCormick	neo-pro (Lotto–Belisol U23)
Martin Mortensen	Cult Energy Pro Cycling
James Oram	Axeon Cycling Team
Glenn O'Shea	Team Budget Forklifts
Dion Smith	Hincapie Racing Team
Steele Von Hoff	NFTO

Riders who left the team during or after the 2015 season

Rider	2016 team
George Atkins	JLT–Condor
Jonathan Bellis	Retired
Dexter Gardias	Pedal Heaven
Marc Hester	Sorø BC
Jon Mould	JLT–Condor

== Season victories ==
Date	Race	Competition	Rider	Country	Location
22 January	New Zealand Cycle Classic, Stage 3	UCI Oceania Tour	Kristian House (GBR)	New Zealand	Carterton
20 February	The REV Classic	UCI Oceania Tour	Dion Smith (NZL)	New Zealand	Cambridge
17 April	Tro-Bro Léon	UCI Europe Tour	Martin Mortensen (DEN)	France	Lannilis
18 May	Tour of Norway, Stage 1	UCI Europe Tour	Steele Von Hoff (AUS)	Norway	Langesund
6 June	Tour de Korea, Stage 2	UCI Asia Tour	Chris Opie (GBR)	South Korea	Gunsan
7 June	Tour de Korea, Stage 3	UCI Asia Tour	Karol Domagalski (POL)	South Korea	Daejeon
9 June	Tour de Korea, Stage 5	UCI Asia Tour	Karol Domagalski (POL)	South Korea	Asan
11 June	Tour de Korea, Stage 7	UCI Asia Tour	Kristian House (GBR)	South Korea	Seoul
19 June	Beaumont Trophy	UCI Europe Tour	Dion Smith (NZL)	United Kingdom	Stamfordham
7 July	Sibiu Cycling Tour, Stage 1	UCI Europe Tour	Steele Von Hoff (AUS)	Romania	Sibiu
27 August	Ronde van Midden-Nederland, Stage 1	UCI Europe Tour	Team Time Trial (Note: The winning riders were Tom Baylis, Dion Smith, Chris Opie, Karol Domagalski, Marcin Białobłocki, Peter Williams, Glenn O'Shea and Hayden McCormick)	Netherlands	Leersum
28 August	Ronde van Midden-Nederland, Stage 2	UCI Europe Tour	Chris Opie (GBR)	Netherlands	Utrecht
28 August	Ronde van Midden-Nederland, Overall	UCI Europe Tour	Chris Opie (GBR)	Netherlands	
28 August	Ronde van Midden-Nederland, Teams classification	UCI Europe Tour	(Note: The riders on the squad were Tom Baylis, Marcin Białobłocki, Karol Domagalski, Hayden McCormick, Chris Opie, Glenn O'Shea, Dion Smith, and Peter Williams)	Netherlands	
23 October	Abu Dhabi Tour, Teams classification	UCI Asia Tour	(Note: The riders on the squad were Karol Domagalski, Kristian House, Hayden McCormick, Dion Smith, Steele Von Hoff, and Samuel Williams)	United Arab Emirates	
