= 2016 Tour de Yorkshire =

2nd men's Tour de Yorkshire

2016 UCI Europe Tour

Race details
- Dates: 29 April 2016–1 May 2016
- Stages: 3

Results
Jersey awarded to the overall winner	Winner	Thomas Voeckler (FRA)	(Direct Énergie)
	Second	Nicolas Roche (IRL)	(Team Sky)
	Third	Anthony Turgis (FRA)	(Cofidis)
Jersey awarded to the points classification winner	Points	Dylan Groenewegen (NED)	(LottoNL–Jumbo)
Jersey awarded to the mountains classification winner	Mountains	Nathan Haas (AUS)	(Team Dimension Data)

The 2016 Tour de Yorkshire was a three-day cycling stage race took place in Yorkshire from the 29 April to the 1 May 2016, It was the second edition of the Tour de Yorkshire and was organised by Welcome to Yorkshire and the Amaury Sport Organisation. The Route was Beverley–Settle, Otley–Doncaster, and Middlesbrough–Scarborough. There was also a women's race on 30 April. The organisers had applied to British Cycling to increase the race to four days for 2016 but this application was rejected.

== Teams ==
18 teams were selected to take part in Tour de Yorkshire. Seven of these were UCI WorldTeams; five were UCI Professional Continental teams; five were UCI Continental teams and one was the Great Britain national team. Teams could enter between five and eight riders.

UCI WorldTeams

- BMC Racing Team
- Team Dimension Data
- Team Katusha
- Team Giant–Alpecin
- LottoNL–Jumbo
- Team Sky
- Orica–GreenEDGE

UCI Professional Continental teams

- Cofidis
- Direct Énergie
- ONE Pro Cycling
- Roompot–Oranje Peloton
- Topsport Vlaanderen–Baloise

UCI Continental teams

- JLT–Condor
- NFTO
- Madison Genesis
- Team Raleigh–GAC
- WIGGINS

National teams

- Great Britain

== Race route ==
On 9 October 2015, the start and finish locations for the event were released, these were Beverley, Doncaster, Middlesbrough, Otley, Scarborough, and Settle.

The stage routes were released on 9 December 2015.

Stage characteristics and winners
Stage	Date	Start	Finish	Length	Type	Winner
1	29 April	Beverley	Settle	184 km (114.3 miles)	Intermediate stage	Dylan Groenewegen (NED)
2	30 April	Otley	Doncaster	135.5 km (84.2 miles)	Flat stage	Danny van Poppel (NED)
3	1 May	Middlesbrough	Scarborough	198 km (123.0 miles)	Hilly stage	Thomas Voeckler (FRA)

== Stages ==
=== Stage 1 ===
29 April — Beverley to Settle, 184 km (114 mi)

Result of stage 1
Rank	Rider	Team	Time
1	Dylan Groenewegen (NED)	LottoNL–Jumbo	5h 09' 11"
2	Caleb Ewan (AUS)	Orica–GreenEDGE	+ 0"
3	Nikias Arndt (GER)	Team Giant–Alpecin	+ 0"
4	Thomas Boudat (FRA)	Direct Énergie	+ 0"
5	Danny van Poppel (NED)	Team Sky	+ 0"
6	Floris Gerts (NED)	BMC Racing Team	+ 0"
7	Christopher Lawless (GBR)	JLT–Condor	+ 0"
8	Karol Domagalski (POL)	ONE Pro Cycling	+ 0"
9	Dion Smith (NZL)	ONE Pro Cycling	+ 0"
10	Bert Van Lerberghe (BEL)	Topsport Vlaanderen–Baloise	+ 0"

General classification after stage 1
Rank	Rider	Team	Time
1	Dylan Groenewegen (NED)	LottoNL–Jumbo	5h 09' 11"
2	Caleb Ewan (AUS)	Orica–GreenEDGE	+ 4"
3	Nikias Arndt (GER)	Team Giant–Alpecin	+ 6"
4	Anthony Turgis (FRA)	Cofidis	+ 7"
5	Thomas Voeckler (FRA)	Direct Énergie	+ 8"
6	Serge Pauwels (BEL)	Team Dimension Data	+ 9"
7	Thomas Boudat (FRA)	Direct Énergie	+ 10"
8	Danny van Poppel (NED)	Team Sky	+ 10"
9	Floris Gerts (NED)	BMC Racing Team	+ 10"
10	Christopher Lawless (GBR)	JLT–Condor	+ 10"

=== Stage 2 ===
30 April — Otley to Doncaster 135.5 km (84.2 mi)

Result of stage 2
Rank	Rider	Team	Time
1	Danny van Poppel (NED)	Team Sky	3h 04' 20"
2	Dylan Groenewegen (NED)	LottoNL–Jumbo	+ 0"
3	Nikias Arndt (GER)	Team Giant–Alpecin	+ 0"
4	Chris Opie (GBR)	ONE Pro Cycling	+ 0"
5	Loïc Chetout (FRA)	Cofidis	+ 0"
6	Albert Torres (ESP)	Team Raleigh–GAC	+ 0"
7	Rick Zabel (GER)	BMC Racing Team	+ 0"
8	Christopher Lawless (GBR)	JLT–Condor	+ 0"
9	Russell Downing (GBR)	JLT–Condor	+ 0"
10	Magnus Cort (DEN)	Orica–GreenEDGE	+ 0"

General classification after stage 2
Rank	Rider	Team	Time
1	Dylan Groenewegen (NED)	LottoNL–Jumbo	8h 13' 15"
2	Danny van Poppel (NED)	Team Sky	+ 6"
3	Nikias Arndt (GER)	Team Giant–Alpecin	+ 8"
4	Caleb Ewan (AUS)	Orica–GreenEDGE	+ 10"
5	Stijn Steels (BEL)	Topsport Vlaanderen–Baloise	+ 10"
6	Gruffudd Lewis (GBR)	Madison Genesis	+ 12"
7	Anthony Turgis (FRA)	Cofidis	+ 13"
8	Thomas Voeckler (FRA)	Direct Énergie	+ 14"
9	Serge Pauwels (BEL)	Team Dimension Data	+ 15"
10	Richard Handley (GBR)	ONE Pro Cycling	+ 15"

=== Stage 3 ===
1 May — Middlesbrough to Scarborough 198 km (123 mi)

Result of stage 3
Rank	Rider	Team	Time
1	Thomas Voeckler (FRA)	Direct Énergie	4h 51' 57"
2	Nicolas Roche (IRL)	Team Sky	+ 0"
3	Adam Yates (GBR)	Orica–GreenEDGE	+ 9"
4	Anthony Turgis (FRA)	Cofidis	+ 9"
5	Steven Kruijswijk (NED)	LottoNL–Jumbo	+ 9"
6	Lars Petter Nordhaug (NOR)	Team Sky	+ 41"
7	Gianni Moscon (ITA)	Team Sky	+ 41"
8	Christopher Juul-Jensen (DEN)	Orica–GreenEDGE	+ 1' 09"
9	Ben Hermans (BEL)	BMC Racing Team	+ 1' 09"
10	Nikias Arndt (GER)	Team Giant–Alpecin	+ 1' 09"

Final general classification
Rank	Rider	Team	Time
1	Thomas Voeckler (FRA)	Direct Énergie	13h 05' 16"
2	Nicolas Roche (IRL)	Team Sky	+ 6"
3	Anthony Turgis (FRA)	Cofidis	+ 16"
4	Adam Yates (GBR)	Orica–GreenEDGE	+ 17"
5	Steven Kruijswijk (NED)	LottoNL–Jumbo	+ 21"
6	Lars Petter Nordhaug (NOR)	Team Sky	+ 41"
7	Gianni Moscon (ITA)	Team Sky	+ 52"
8	Nikias Arndt (GER)	Team Giant–Alpecin	+ 1' 13"
9	Serge Pauwels (BEL)	Team Dimension Data	+ 1' 20"
10	Dion Smith (NZL)	ONE Pro Cycling	+ 1' 21"

== Classifications ==
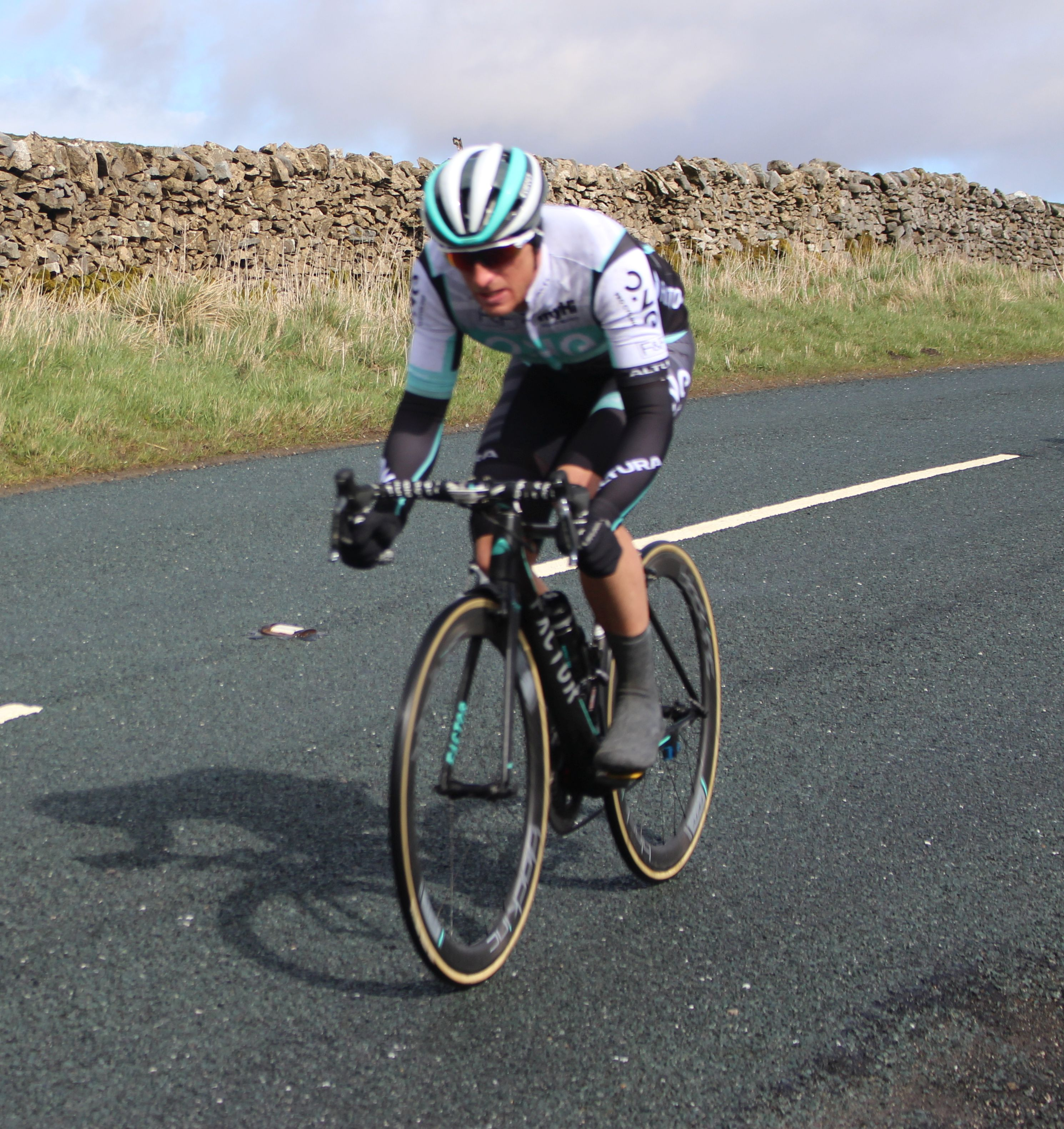
Peter Williams holder of the pink and grey jerseys after stage 1, leading the peloton near Grimwith Reservoir during stage 1

The race included three classifications the most important the general classification. This was calculated by adding up each cyclist's finishing times on each stage. Bonus seconds were awarded for top-three placings in each stage (10 seconds for the first rider, 6 seconds for the second, 4 seconds for the third) and for placings in intermediate sprints (3 seconds for the first rider, 2 seconds for the second, 1 second for the third). The rider with the lowest cumulative time after taking bonus seconds into account was the leader of the classification and was awarded a blue and yellow jersey. (Blue and yellow are colours traditionally associated with Yorkshire.) The winner of the general classification was considered the winner of the race.

The second classification was points classification. On each stage of the race, points were awarded to the top 10 riders. The winner won 15 points, with 12 for the second-placed rider, 9 for the third-placed rider, 7 for the sixth-placed rider and then one point fewer for each place down to tenth place. Points were also awarded to the top three riders at intermediate sprints, with five points for the winner of the sprint, three points for the rider in second place, and one point for the rider in third place. The rider with the most points was the leader of the classification and was awarded a green jersey.

There was also a mountains classification. Over the three stages, there were 13 categorised climbs. On each of these climbs, the first four riders to the summit were awarded points, with 5 for the first rider, 3 for the second, 2 for the third and 1 for the fourth. The rider with the most accumulated points was the leader of the classification and was awarded a dark pink jersey.

Another jersey was awarded at the end of each stage. This was a combativity prize and was to be awarded to the rider who "made the greatest effort and [...] demonstrated the best qualities in terms of sportsmanship". A jury selected a list of riders to be eligible for the prize; the winner of the prize was then decided by a vote on Twitter. The rider was awarded a grey jersey.

Stage	Winner	General classification	Points classification	Mountains classification	Combativity prize
1	Dylan Groenewegen	Dylan Groenewegen	Dylan Groenewegen	Peter Williams	Peter Williams
2	Danny van Poppel	Dylan Groenewegen	Dylan Groenewegen	Richard Handley	Nicolas Edet
3	Thomas Voeckler	Thomas Voeckler	Dylan Groenewegen	Nathan Haas	Peter Kennaugh
Final		Thomas Voeckler	Dylan Groenewegen	Nathan Haas	not awarded
