= 2016 Dubai Tour =

UCI Asia Tour

Race details
- Dates: 3–6 February 2016
- Stages: 4
- Distance: 671 km (416.9 mi)
- Winning time: 14h 46' 54"

Results
Jersey awarded to the overall winner	Winner	Marcel Kittel (GER)	(Etixx–Quick-Step)
	Second	Giacomo Nizzolo (ITA)	(Trek–Segafredo)
	Third	Juan José Lobato (ESP)	(Movistar Team)
Jersey awarded to the points classification winner	Points	Marcel Kittel (GER)	(Etixx–Quick-Step)
Jersey awarded to the youth classification winner	Youth	Soufiane Haddi (MAR)	(Skydive Dubai–Al Ahli)
Jersey awarded to the sprints classification winner	Sprints	Marcin Białobłocki (POL)	(ONE Pro Cycling)

The 2016 Dubai Tour was a road cycling stage race that took place in Dubai between 3 and 6 February 2016. It was the third edition of the Dubai Tour and was rated as a 2.HC event as part of the 2016 UCI Asia Tour.

The race was made up of four stages. Three of these were suited for sprinters, with the third stage ending with an uphill finish to the Hatta Dam. The defending champion was Mark Cavendish, who won the 2015 Dubai Tour for Etixx–Quick-Step but was riding for his new team, Team Dimension Data.

Marcel Kittel (Etixx–Quick-Step) won the first stage to take the lead of the race. Elia Viviani (Team Sky) won the second stage and took over the race lead. The Hatta Dam stage was won by Juan José Lobato (Movistar Team), with Giacomo Nizzolo (Trek–Segafredo taking the overall lead of the race. Kittel won the final stage and, with the help of bonus seconds, took the overall victory. Nizzolo was second, with Lobato third.

== Teams ==
Sixteen teams were invited to take part in the race. Ten of these were UCI WorldTeams; there were also three UCI Professional Continental teams and three UCI Continental teams. There were a maximum of eight riders per team; since not every team brought their full quota of riders, 123 riders were entered in the startlist.

UCI WorldTeams

- Team Dimension Data
- Astana
- BMC Racing Team
- Etixx–Quick-Step
- Lampre–Merida
- Movistar Team
- Team Giant–Alpecin
- Team Sky
- Tinkoff
- Trek–Segafredo

UCI Professional Continental teams

- CCC–Sprandi–Polkowice
- ONE Pro Cycling
- Team Novo Nordisk

UCI Continental teams

- WIGGINS
- Skydive Dubai–Al Ahli
- Al Nasr Pro Cycling Team–Dubai

== Stages ==
Stage schedule
Stage	Date	Route	Distance	Type	Winner
1	3 February	Dubai–Fujairah	179 km (111 mi)	Flat stage	Marcel Kittel (GER)
2	4 February	Dubai–Palm Jumeirah	188 km (117 mi)	Flat stage	Elia Viviani (ITA)
3	5 February	Dubai–Hatta Dam	172 km (107 mi)	Hilly stage	Juan Jose Lobato (SPA)
4	6 February	Dubai–Burj Khalifa	132 km (82 mi)	Flat stage	Marcel Kittel (GER)

=== Stage 1 ===
3 February 2016 – Dubai–Fujairah, 179 km (111 mi)

Result of Stage 1
Rank	Rider	Team	Time
1	Marcel Kittel (GER)	Etixx–Quick-Step	3h 35' 21"
2	Mark Cavendish (GBR)	Team Dimension Data	+ 0"
3	Giacomo Nizzolo (ITA)	Trek–Segafredo	+ 0"
4	Sacha Modolo (ITA)	Lampre–Merida	+ 0"
5	Andrea Palini (ITA)	Skydive Dubai–Al Ahli	+ 0"
6	Andrea Guardini (ITA)	Astana	+ 0"
7	Chris Opie (GBR)	ONE Pro Cycling	+ 0"
8	Elia Viviani (ITA)	Team Sky	+ 0"
9	Michael Kolář (SVK)	Tinkoff	+ 0"
10	Tomas Vaitkus (LTU)	Al Nasr Pro Cycling Team–Dubai	+ 0"

General classification after Stage 1
Rank	Rider	Team	Time
1	Marcel Kittel (GER)	Etixx–Quick-Step	3h 35' 11"
2	Mark Cavendish (GBR)	Team Dimension Data	+ 4"
3	Giacomo Nizzolo (ITA)	Trek–Segafredo	+ 6"
4	Sacha Modolo (ITA)	Lampre–Merida	+ 10"
5	Andrea Palini (ITA)	Skydive Dubai–Al Ahli	+ 10"
6	Andrea Guardini (ITA)	Astana	+ 10"
7	Chris Opie (GBR)	ONE Pro Cycling	+ 10"
8	Elia Viviani (ITA)	Team Sky	+ 10"
9	Michael Kolář (SVK)	Tinkoff	+ 10"
10	Tomas Vaitkus (LTU)	Al Nasr Pro Cycling Team–Dubai	+ 10"

=== Stage 2 ===
4 February – Dubai–Palm Jumeirah (188 km (117 mi))

Result of Stage 2
Rank	Rider	Team	Time
1	Elia Viviani (ITA)	Team Sky	4h 07' 39"
2	Sacha Modolo (ITA)	Lampre–Merida	+ 0"
3	Giacomo Nizzolo (ITA)	Trek–Segafredo	+ 0"
4	Andrea Guardini (ITA)	Astana	+ 0"
5	Tomas Vaitkus (LIT)	Al Nasr Pro Cycling Team–Dubai	+ 0"
6	Ben Swift (GBR)	Team Sky	+ 0"
7	Michael Kolář (SVK)	Tinkoff	+ 0"
8	Grzegorz Stępniak (POL)	CCC–Sprandi–Polkowice	+ 0"
9	Chris Opie (GBR)	ONE Pro Cycling	+ 0"
10	Mark Cavendish (GBR)	Team Dimension Data	+ 0"

General classification after Stage 2
Rank	Rider	Team	Time
1	Elia Viviani (ITA)	Team Sky	7h 42' 50"
2	Marcel Kittel (GER)	Etixx–Quick-Step	+ 0"
3	Giacomo Nizzolo (ITA)	Trek–Segafredo	+ 2"
4	Sacha Modolo (ITA)	Lampre–Merida	+ 4"
5	Mark Cavendish (GBR)	Team Dimension Data	+ 4"
6	Soufiane Haddi (MAR)	Skydive Dubai–Al Ahli	+ 9"
7	Andrea Guardini (ITA)	Astana	+ 10"
8	Tomas Vaitkus (LIT)	Al Nasr Pro Cycling Team–Dubai	+ 10"
9	Michael Kolář (SVK)	Tinkoff	+ 10"
10	Chris Opie (GBR)	ONE Pro Cycling	+ 10"

=== Stage 3 ===
5 February – Dubai–Hatta Dam, 172 km (107 mi)

Result of Stage 3
Rank	Rider	Team	Time
1	Juan José Lobato (ESP)	Movistar Team	4h 13' 23"
2	Giacomo Nizzolo (ITA)	Trek–Segafredo	+ 2"
3	Silvan Dillier (SUI)	BMC Racing Team	+ 4"
4	Fabian Cancellara (SUI)	Trek–Segafredo	+ 4"
5	Philippe Gilbert (BEL)	BMC Racing Team	+ 4"
6	Marcel Kittel (GER)	Etixx–Quick-Step	+ 4"
7	Gorka Izagirre (ESP)	Movistar Team	+ 7"
8	Daniele Bennati (ITA)	Tinkoff	+ 7"
9	Davide Rebellin (ITA)	CCC–Sprandi–Polkowice	+ 7"
10	Matteo Trentin (ITA)	Etixx–Quick-Step	+ 11"

General classification after Stage 3
Rank	Rider	Team	Time
1	Giacomo Nizzolo (ITA)	Trek–Segafredo	11h 56' 11"
2	Juan José Lobato (ESP)	Movistar Team	+ 2"
3	Marcel Kittel (GER)	Etixx–Quick-Step	+ 6"
4	Silvan Dillier (SUI)	BMC Racing Team	+ 12"
5	Gorka Izagirre (ESP)	Movistar Team	+ 19"
6	Philippe Gilbert (BEL)	BMC Racing Team	+ 21"
7	Fabian Cancellara (SUI)	Trek–Segafredo	+ 21"
8	Daniele Bennati (ITA)	Tinkoff	+ 24"
9	Davide Rebellin (ITA)	CCC–Sprandi–Polkowice	+ 24"
10	Soufiane Haddi (MAR)	Skydive Dubai–Al Ahli	+ 25"

=== Stage 4 ===
6 February – Dubai–Burj Khalifa, 132 km (82 mi)

Result of Stage 4
Rank	Rider	Team	Time
1	Marcel Kittel (GER)	Etixx–Quick-Step	2h 50' 47"
2	Elia Viviani (ITA)	Team Sky	+ 0"
3	Mark Cavendish (GBR)	Team Dimension Data	+ 0"
4	Andrea Palini (ITA)	Skydive Dubai–Al Ahli	+ 0"
5	Sacha Modolo (ITA)	Lampre–Merida	+ 0"
6	Giacomo Nizzolo (ITA)	Trek–Segafredo	+ 0"
7	Fabio Sabatini (ITA)	Etixx–Quick-Step	+ 0"
8	Jasper Stuyven (BEL)	Trek–Segafredo	+ 0"
9	Erik Baška (SVK)	Tinkoff	+ 0"
10	Yanto Barker (GBR)	ONE Pro Cycling	+ 0"

Result of General Classification
Rank	Rider	Team	Time
1	Marcel Kittel (GER)	Etixx–Quick-Step	14h 46' 54"
2	Giacomo Nizzolo (ITA)	Trek–Segafredo	+ 4"
3	Juan José Lobato (ESP)	Movistar Team	+ 6"
4	Silvan Dillier (SUI)	BMC Racing Team	+ 16"
5	Gorka Izagirre (ESP)	Movistar Team	+ 23"
6	Philippe Gilbert (BEL)	BMC Racing Team	+ 25"
7	Fabian Cancellara (SUI)	Trek–Segafredo	+ 25"
8	Daniele Bennati (ITA)	Tinkoff	+ 28"
9	Davide Rebellin (ITA)	CCC–Sprandi–Polkowice	+ 28"
10	Soufiane Haddi (MAR)	Skydive Dubai–Al Ahli	+ 29"

== Classification leadership table ==
Stage	Winner	General classification	Points classification	Sprint classification	Young rider classification
1	Marcel Kittel	Marcel Kittel	Marcel Kittel	Soufiane Haddi	Soufiane Haddi
2	Elia Viviani	Elia Viviani	Elia Viviani	Marcin Białobłocki	Soufiane Haddi
3	Juan José Lobato	Giacomo Nizzolo	Giacomo Nizzolo	Marcin Białobłocki	Soufiane Haddi
4	Marcel Kittel	Marcel Kittel	Marcel Kittel	Marcin Białobłocki	Soufiane Haddi
Final		Marcel Kittel	Marcel Kittel	Marcin Białobłocki	Soufiane Haddi
