= 2015 Tour of Britain =

2015 UCI Europe Tour
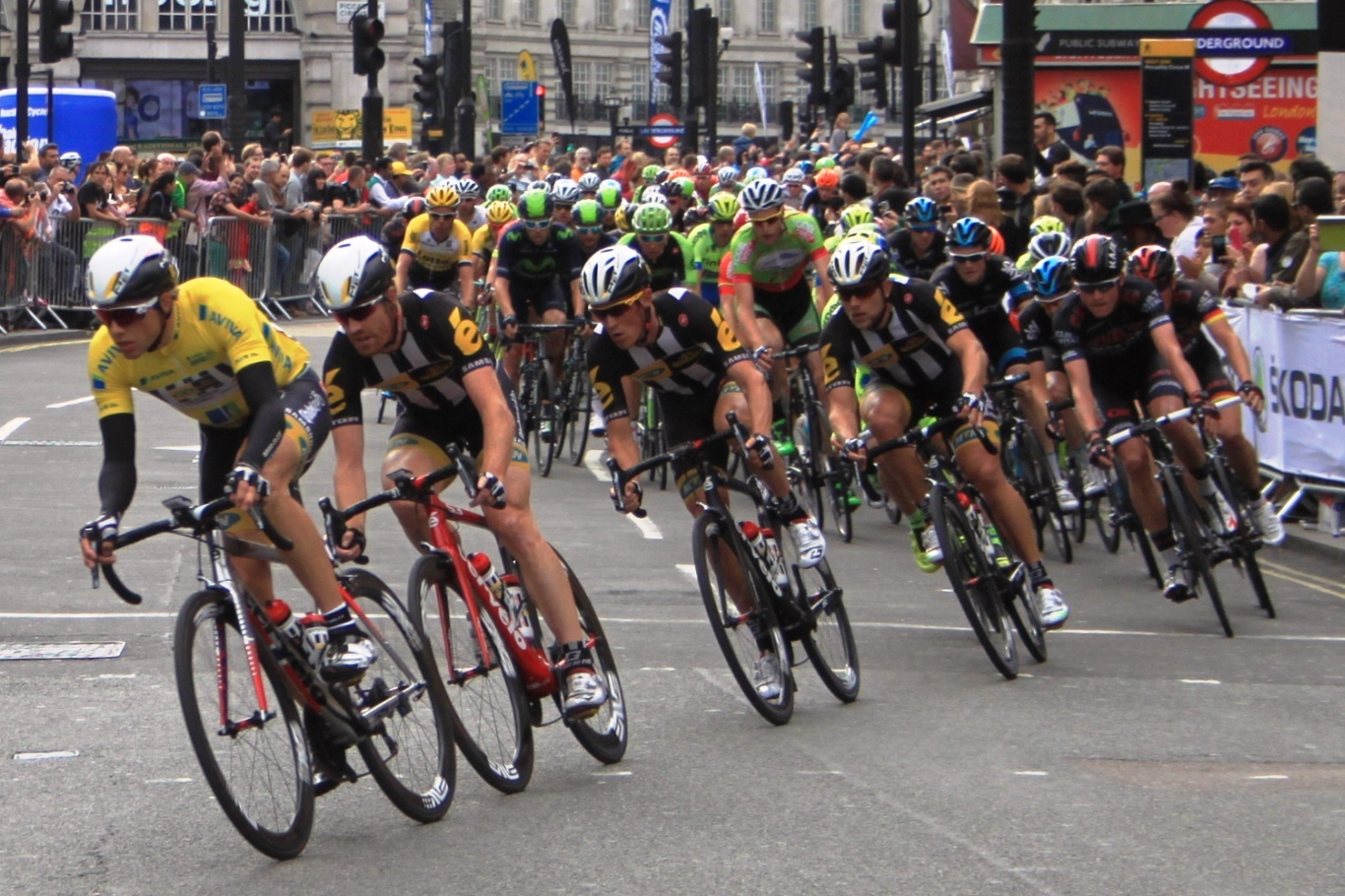
- Edvald Boasson Hagen in the final stage with his MTN-Qhubeka team

Race details
- Dates: 6–13 September 2015
- Stages: 8
- Distance: 1,451 km (901.6 mi)
- Winning time: 34h 52' 52"

Results
Jersey awarded to the overall winner	Winner	Edvald Boasson Hagen (NOR)	(MTN–Qhubeka)
	Second	Wout Poels (NED)	(Team Sky)
	Third	Owain Doull (GBR)	(WIGGINS)
Jersey awarded to the points classification winner	Points	Owain Doull (GBR)	(WIGGINS)
Jersey awarded to the mountains classification winner	Mountains	Peter Williams (GBR)	(ONE Pro Cycling)
Jersey awarded to the sprints classification winner	Sprints	Peter Williams (GBR)	(ONE Pro Cycling)
	Team	Cannondale–Garmin	

The 2015 Aviva Tour of Britain was an eight-stage men's professional road cycling race. It was the twelfth running of the 2004 incarnation of the Tour of Britain and the 76th British tour in total. The race started on 6 September in Beaumaris and finished on 13 September in London. The race was part of the 2015 UCI Europe Tour.

== Teams ==
The twenty teams invited to participate in the Tour of Britain are:

UCI ProTeams
- BMC Racing Team
- Cannondale–Garmin
- Etixx–Quick-Step
- IAM Cycling
- LottoNL–Jumbo
- Lotto–Soudal
- Movistar Team
- Team Sky
- Tinkoff–Saxo
UCI Professional Continental Teams
- Cult Energy Pro Cycling
- MTN–Qhubeka
- Team Novo Nordisk
UCI Continental Teams
- An Post–Chain Reaction
- JLT–Condor
- Madison Genesis
- NFTO
- ONE Pro Cycling
- Team Raleigh
- WIGGINS
National Teams
- Great Britain

== Stages ==
List of stages
Stage	Date	Course	Distance	Type	Winner	Ref
1	6 September	Beaumaris – Wrexham	177 km (110 mi)	Hilly stage	Elia Viviani (ITA)	
2	7 September	Clitheroe – Colne	162 km (101 mi)	Hilly stage	Petr Vakoč (CZE)	
3	8 September	Cockermouth – Floors Castle	216 km (134 mi)	Flat stage	Elia Viviani (ITA)	
4	9 September	Edinburgh – Blyth	218 km (135 mi)	Flat stage	Fernando Gaviria (COL)	
5	10 September	Prudhoe – Hartside Fell, Cumbria	171 km (106 mi)	Medium-mountain stage	Wout Poels (NED)	
6	11 September	Stoke-on-Trent – Nottingham	189 km (117 mi)	Hilly stage	Matteo Trentin (ITA)	
7	12 September	Fakenham – Ipswich	225 km (140 mi)	Flat stage	André Greipel (GER)	
8	13 September	London	93 km (58 mi)	Flat stage	Elia Viviani (ITA)	

=== Stage 1 ===
6 September 2015 — Beaumaris to Wrexham, 177 kilometres (110 mi)

Stage 1 Result

	Rider	Team	Time
1	Elia Viviani (ITA)	Team Sky	4h 26' 29"
2	Mark Cavendish (GBR)	Etixx–Quick-Step	s.t.
3	André Greipel (GER)	Lotto–Soudal	s.t.
4	Owain Doull (GBR)	WIGGINS	s.t.
5	Juan José Lobato (ESP)	Movistar Team	s.t.
6	Pim Ligthart (NED)	Lotto–Soudal	s.t.
7	Mark Renshaw (AUS)	Etixx–Quick-Step	s.t.
8	Tyler Farrar (USA)	MTN–Qhubeka	s.t.
9	Alberto Bettiol (ITA)	Cannondale–Garmin	s.t.
10	Graham Briggs (GBR)	JLT–Condor	s.t.

General Classification after Stage 1

	Rider	Team	Time
1	Elia Viviani (ITA)	Team Sky	4h 26' 19"
2	Mark Cavendish (GBR)	Etixx–Quick-Step	+ 4"
3	André Greipel (GER)	Lotto–Soudal	+ 6"
4	Owain Doull (GBR)	WIGGINS	+ 10"
5	Juan José Lobato (ESP)	Movistar Team	+ 10"
6	Pim Ligthart (NED)	Lotto–Soudal	+ 10"
7	Mark Renshaw (AUS)	Etixx–Quick-Step	+ 10"
8	Tyler Farrar (USA)	MTN–Qhubeka	+ 10"
9	Alberto Bettiol (ITA)	Cannondale–Garmin	+ 10"
10	Graham Briggs (GBR)	JLT–Condor	+ 10"

=== Stage 2 ===
7 September 2015 — Clitheroe to Colne, 162 kilometres (101 mi)

Stage 2 Result

	Rider	Team	Time
1	Petr Vakoč (CZE)	Etixx–Quick-Step	4h 02' 22"
2	Juan José Lobato (ESP)	Movistar Team	+ 7"
3	Edvald Boasson Hagen (NOR)	MTN–Qhubeka	+ 9"
4	Rasmus Guldhammer (DEN)	Cult Energy Pro Cycling	+ 9"
5	Matteo Trentin (ITA)	Etixx–Quick-Step	+ 9"
6	Owain Doull (GBR)	WIGGINS	+ 9"
7	Jens Debusschere (BEL)	Lotto–Soudal	+ 9"
8	Dylan Teuns (BEL)	BMC Racing Team	+ 9"
9	Gorka Izagirre (ESP)	Movistar Team	+ 9"
10	Javier Mejías (ESP)	Team Novo Nordisk	+ 9"

General Classification after Stage 2

	Rider	Team	Time
1	Petr Vakoč (CZE)	Etixx–Quick-Step	8h 28' 41"
2	Juan José Lobato (ESP)	Movistar Team	+ 11"
3	Edvald Boasson Hagen (NOR)	MTN–Qhubeka	+ 15"
4	Floris Gerts (NED)	BMC Racing Team	+ 17"
5	Wout Poels (NED)	Team Sky	+ 18"
6	Dylan van Baarle (NED)	Cannondale–Garmin	+ 18"
7	Owain Doull (GBR)	WIGGINS	+ 19"
8	Graham Briggs (GBR)	JLT–Condor	+ 19"
9	Rasmus Guldhammer (DEN)	Cult Energy Pro Cycling	+ 19"
10	Serge Pauwels (BEL)	MTN–Qhubeka	+ 25"

=== Stage 3 ===
8 September 2015 — Cockermouth to Floors Castle, 216 kilometres (134 mi)

Stage 3 Result

	Rider	Team	Time
1	Elia Viviani (ITA)	Team Sky	5h 08' 18"
2	Juan José Lobato (ESP)	Movistar Team	s.t.
3	Matteo Trentin (ITA)	Etixx–Quick-Step	s.t.
4	Sondre Holst Enger (NOR)	IAM Cycling	s.t.
5	Jens Debusschere (BEL)	Lotto–Soudal	s.t.
6	Owain Doull (GBR)	WIGGINS	s.t.
7	Alberto Bettiol (ITA)	Cannondale–Garmin	s.t.
8	Graham Briggs (GBR)	JLT–Condor	s.t.
9	Alex Peters (GBR)	Great Britain	s.t.
10	Wout Poels (NED)	Team Sky	s.t.

General Classification after Stage 3

	Rider	Team	Time
1	Juan José Lobato (ESP)	Movistar Team	13h 37' 04"
2	Edvald Boasson Hagen (NOR)	MTN–Qhubeka	+ 10"
3	Floris Gerts (NED)	BMC Racing Team	+ 12"
4	Wout Poels (NED)	Team Sky	+ 13"
5	Dylan van Baarle (NED)	Cannondale–Garmin	+ 13"
6	Owain Doull (GBR)	WIGGINS	+ 14"
7	Graham Briggs (GBR)	JLT–Condor	+ 14"
8	Rasmus Guldhammer (DEN)	Cult Energy Pro Cycling	+ 14"
9	Matteo Trentin (ITA)	Etixx–Quick-Step	+ 18"
10	Serge Pauwels (BEL)	MTN–Qhubeka	+ 20"

=== Stage 4 ===
9 September 2015 — Edinburgh to Blyth, 135 kilometres (84 mi)

Stage 4 Result

	Rider	Team	Time
1	Fernando Gaviria (COL)	Etixx–Quick-Step	5h 13' 08"
2	André Greipel (GER)	Lotto–Soudal	s.t.
3	Edvald Boasson Hagen (NOR)	MTN–Qhubeka	s.t.
4	Owain Doull (GBR)	WIGGINS	s.t.
5	Jens Debusschere (BEL)	Lotto–Soudal	s.t.
6	Jonas Vangenechten (BEL)	IAM Cycling	s.t.
7	Elia Viviani (ITA)	Team Sky	s.t.
8	Gerald Ciolek (GER)	MTN–Qhubeka	s.t.
9	Floris Gerts (NED)	BMC Racing Team	s.t.
10	Graham Briggs (GBR)	JLT–Condor	s.t.

General Classification after Stage 4

	Rider	Team	Time
1	Juan José Lobato (ESP)	Movistar Team	18h 50' 12"
2	Edvald Boasson Hagen (NOR)	MTN–Qhubeka	+ 6"
3	Floris Gerts (NED)	BMC Racing Team	+ 12"
4	Wout Poels (NED)	Team Sky	+ 13"
5	Dylan van Baarle (NED)	Cannondale–Garmin	+ 13"
6	Owain Doull (GBR)	WIGGINS	+ 14"
7	Graham Briggs (GBR)	JLT–Condor	+ 14"
8	Rasmus Guldhammer (DEN)	Cult Energy Pro Cycling	+ 14"
9	Matteo Trentin (ITA)	Etixx–Quick-Step	+ 18"
10	Serge Pauwels (BEL)	MTN–Qhubeka	+ 20"

=== Stage 5 ===
10 September 2015 — Prudhoe to Hartside Fell, Cumbria, 171 kilometres (106 mi)

Stage 5 Result

	Rider	Team	Time
1	Wout Poels (NED)	Team Sky	4h 12' 22"
2	Edvald Boasson Hagen (NOR)	MTN–Qhubeka	+ 2"
3	Beñat Intxausti (ESP)	Movistar Team	+ 17"
4	Zdeněk Štybar (CZE)	Etixx–Quick-Step	+ 18"
5	Rasmus Guldhammer (DEN)	Cult Energy Pro Cycling	+ 18"
6	Steven Kruijswijk (NED)	LottoNL–Jumbo	+ 18"
7	Xandro Meurisse (BEL)	An Post–Chain Reaction	+ 18"
8	Chris Anker Sørensen (DEN)	Tinkoff–Saxo	+ 18"
9	Rubén Fernández (ESP)	Movistar Team	+ 18"
10	Dylan Teuns (BEL)	BMC Racing Team	+ 18"

General Classification after Stage 5

	Rider	Team	Time
1	Edvald Boasson Hagen (NOR)	MTN–Qhubeka	23h 02' 36"
2	Wout Poels (NED)	Team Sky	+ 1"
3	Rasmus Guldhammer (DEN)	Cult Energy Pro Cycling	+ 30"
4	Beñat Intxausti (ESP)	Movistar Team	+ 33"
5	Owain Doull (GBR)	WIGGINS	+ 37"
6	Dylan Teuns (BEL)	BMC Racing Team	+ 38"
7	Zdeněk Štybar (CZE)	Etixx–Quick-Step	+ 38"
8	Rubén Fernández (ESP)	Movistar Team	+ 38"
9	Steven Kruijswijk (NED)	LottoNL–Jumbo	+ 38"
10	Chris Anker Sørensen (DEN)	Tinkoff–Saxo	+ 38"

=== Stage 6 ===
11 September 2015 — Stoke-on-Trent to Nottingham, 189 kilometres (117 mi)

Stage 6 Result

	Rider	Team	Time
1	Matteo Trentin (ITA)	Etixx–Quick-Step	4h 45' 27"
2	Edvald Boasson Hagen (NOR)	MTN–Qhubeka	s.t.
3	Owain Doull (GBR)	WIGGINS	+ 4"
4	Zdeněk Štybar (CZE)	Etixx–Quick-Step	+ 4"
5	Jens Debusschere (BEL)	Lotto–Soudal	+ 4"
6	Alberto Bettiol (ITA)	Cannondale–Garmin	+ 4"
7	Alex Peters (GBR)	Great Britain	+ 4"
8	Dylan Teuns (BEL)	BMC Racing Team	+ 4"
9	Xandro Meurisse (BEL)	An Post–Chain Reaction	+ 4"
10	Wout Poels (NED)	Team Sky	+ 4"

General Classification after Stage 6

	Rider	Team	Time
1	Edvald Boasson Hagen (NOR)	MTN–Qhubeka	27h 47' 54"
2	Wout Poels (NED)	Team Sky	+ 13"
3	Rasmus Guldhammer (DEN)	Cult Energy Pro Cycling	+ 43"
4	Owain Doull (GBR)	WIGGINS	+ 44"
5	Dylan Teuns (BEL)	BMC Racing Team	+ 51"
6	Zdeněk Štybar (CZE)	Etixx–Quick-Step	+ 51"
7	Rubén Fernández (ESP)	Movistar Team	+ 51"
8	Steven Kruijswijk (NED)	LottoNL–Jumbo	+ 51"
9	Xandro Meurisse (BEL)	An Post–Chain Reaction	+ 51"
10	Chris Anker Sørensen (DEN)	Tinkoff–Saxo	+ 51"

=== Stage 7 ===
12 September 2015 — Fakenham to Ipswich, 227 kilometres (141 mi)

Stage 7 Result

	Rider	Team	Time
1	André Greipel (GER)	Lotto–Soudal	5h 14' 42"
2	Elia Viviani (ITA)	Team Sky	s.t.
3	Sondre Holst Enger (NOR)	IAM Cycling	s.t.
4	Mark Renshaw (AUS)	Etixx–Quick-Step	s.t.
5	Edvald Boasson Hagen (NOR)	MTN–Qhubeka	s.t.
6	Owain Doull (GBR)	WIGGINS	s.t.
7	Rasmus Guldhammer (DEN)	Cult Energy Pro Cycling	s.t.
8	Jonas Vangenechten (BEL)	IAM Cycling	s.t.
9	Dylan van Baarle (NED)	Cannondale–Garmin	s.t.
10	Jens Debusschere (BEL)	Lotto–Soudal	s.t.

General Classification after Stage 7

	Rider	Team	Time
1	Edvald Boasson Hagen (NOR)	MTN–Qhubeka	33h 02' 36"
2	Wout Poels (NED)	Team Sky	+ 13"
3	Rasmus Guldhammer (DEN)	Cult Energy Pro Cycling	+ 43"
4	Owain Doull (GBR)	WIGGINS	+ 44"
5	Zdeněk Štybar (CZE)	Etixx–Quick-Step	+ 51"
6	Rubén Fernández (ESP)	Movistar Team	+ 51"
7	Steven Kruijswijk (NED)	LottoNL–Jumbo	+ 51"
8	Dylan van Baarle (NED)	Cannondale–Garmin	+ 59"
9	Chris Anker Sørensen (DEN)	Tinkoff–Saxo	+ 59"
10	Xandro Meurisse (BEL)	An Post–Chain Reaction	+ 1' 02"

=== Stage 8 ===
13 September 2015 — London, 93 kilometres (58 mi)

Stage 8 Result

	Rider	Team	Time
1	Elia Viviani (ITA)	Team Sky	1h 50' 16"
2	Juan José Lobato (ESP)	Movistar Team	s.t.
3	Matteo Trentin (ITA)	Etixx–Quick-Step	s.t.
4	Edvald Boasson Hagen (NOR)	MTN–Qhubeka	s.t.
5	Jens Debusschere (BEL)	Lotto–Soudal	s.t.
6	Sondre Holst Enger (NOR)	IAM Cycling	s.t.
7	Mark Renshaw (AUS)	Etixx–Quick-Step	s.t.
8	Graham Briggs (GBR)	JLT–Condor	s.t.
9	Ruben Zepuntke (GER)	Cannondale–Garmin	s.t.
10	Owain Doull (GBR)	WIGGINS	s.t.

General Classification after Stage 8

	Rider	Team	Time
1	Edvald Boasson Hagen (NOR)	MTN–Qhubeka	34h 52' 52"
2	Wout Poels (NED)	Team Sky	+ 13"
3	Owain Doull (GBR)	WIGGINS	+ 42"
4	Rasmus Guldhammer (DEN)	Cult Energy Pro Cycling	+ 43"
5	Zdeněk Štybar (CZE)	Etixx–Quick-Step	+ 51"
6	Rubén Fernández (ESP)	Movistar Team	+ 51"
7	Steven Kruijswijk (NED)	LottoNL–Jumbo	+ 51"
8	Dylan van Baarle (NED)	Cannondale–Garmin	+ 53"
9	Chris Anker Sørensen (DEN)	Tinkoff–Saxo	+ 59"
10	Xandro Meurisse (BEL)	An Post–Chain Reaction	+ 1' 02"

== Classification leadership ==
Stage	Winner	General classification	Sprint Classification	Mountains Classification	Points Classification	Team Classification
1	Elia Viviani	Elia Viviani	Conor Dunne	Kristian House	Elia Viviani	Team Sky
2	Petr Vakoč	Petr Vakoč	Peter Williams	Tom Stewart	Juan José Lobato	Etixx–Quick-Step
3	Elia Viviani	Juan José Lobato	Peter Williams	Tom Stewart	Juan José Lobato	Etixx–Quick-Step
4	Fernando Gaviria	Juan José Lobato	Peter Williams	Tom Stewart	Owain Doull	Etixx–Quick-Step
5	Wout Poels	Edvald Boasson Hagen	Peter Williams	Peter Williams	Owain Doull	Movistar Team
6	Matteo Trentin	Edvald Boasson Hagen	Peter Williams	Peter Williams	Owain Doull	Cannondale–Garmin
7	André Greipel	Edvald Boasson Hagen	Peter Williams	Peter Williams	Owain Doull	Cannondale–Garmin
8	Elia Viviani	Edvald Boasson Hagen	Peter Williams	Peter Williams	Owain Doull	Cannondale–Garmin
Final		Edvald Boasson Hagen	Peter Williams	Peter Williams	Owain Doull	Cannondale–Garmin

== Standings ==
Legend
Yellow jersey	Denotes the leader of the General classification	Blue jersey	Denotes the leader of the Points classification
White jersey	Denotes the leader of the Mountains classification	Green jersey	Denotes the leader of the Sprints classification

=== General classification ===
	Rider	Team	Time
1	Edvald Boasson Hagen (NOR)	MTN–Qhubeka	34h 52' 52"
2	Wout Poels (NED)	Team Sky	+ 13"
3	Owain Doull (GBR)	WIGGINS	+ 42"
4	Rasmus Guldhammer (DEN)	Cult Energy Pro Cycling	+ 43"
5	Zdeněk Štybar (CZE)	Etixx–Quick-Step	+ 51"
6	Rubén Fernández (ESP)	Movistar Team	+ 51"
7	Steven Kruijswijk (NED)	LottoNL–Jumbo	+ 51"
8	Dylan van Baarle (NED)	Cannondale–Garmin	+ 53"
9	Chris Anker Sørensen (DEN)	Tinkoff–Saxo	+ 59"
10	Xandro Meurisse (BEL)	An Post–Chain Reaction	+ 1' 02"

=== Points classification ===
	Rider	Team	Points
1	Owain Doull (GBR)	WIGGINS	78
2	Edvald Boasson Hagen (NOR)	MTN–Qhubeka	77
3	Jens Debusschere (BEL)	Lotto–Soudal	59
4	Elia Viviani (ITA)	Team Sky	53
5	Matteo Trentin (ITA)	Etixx–Quick-Step	52
6	Juan José Lobato (ESP)	Movistar Team	43
7	Rasmus Guldhammer (DEN)	Cult Energy Pro Cycling	40
8	Zdeněk Štybar (CZE)	Etixx–Quick-Step	32
9	Wout Poels (NED)	Team Sky	31
10	Alberto Bettiol (ITA)	Cannondale–Garmin	31

=== Mountains classification ===
	Rider	Team	Points
1	Peter Williams (GBR)	ONE Pro Cycling	36
2	Tom Stewart (GBR)	Madison Genesis	34
3	Mark McNally (GBR)	Madison Genesis	29
4	Ian Bibby (GBR)	NFTO	28
5	Conor Dunne (IRL)	An Post–Chain Reaction	26
6	Wout Poels (NED)	Team Sky	21
7	Kristian House (GBR)	JLT–Condor	20
8	Tyler Farrar (USA)	MTN–Qhubeka	18
9	Danilo Wyss (SUI)	BMC Racing Team	15
10	Steven Kruijswijk (NED)	LottoNL–Jumbo	14

=== Sprints classification ===
	Rider	Team	Points
1	Peter Williams (GBR)	ONE Pro Cycling	18
2	Conor Dunne (IRL)	An Post–Chain Reaction	11
3	Danilo Wyss (SUI)	BMC Racing Team	10
4	Pim Ligthart (NED)	Lotto–Soudal	8
5	Alex Dowsett (GBR)	Movistar Team	8
6	Dylan van Baarle (NED)	Cannondale–Garmin	7
7	Graham Briggs (GBR)	JLT–Condor	7
8	Matteo Trentin (ITA)	Etixx–Quick-Step	6
9	Russell Downing (GBR)	Cult Energy Pro Cycling	6
10	Marcin Białobłocki (POL)	ONE Pro Cycling	4

=== Team classification ===
	Team	Time
1	Cannondale–Garmin	104h 42' 38"
2	Team Sky	+ 5' 35"
3	Tinkoff–Saxo	+ 5' 35"
4	Movistar Team	+ 44' 37"
5	LottoNL–Jumbo	+ 47' 35"
6	IAM Cycling	+ 52' 46"
7	Great Britain	+ 55' 01"
8	Etixx–Quick-Step	+ 1h 01' 51"
9	Cult Energy Pro Cycling	+ 1h 09' 40"
10	Lotto–Soudal	+ 1h 43' 55"
