= 2016 Abu Dhabi Tour =

2016 UCI Asia Tour

Race details
- Dates: 20–23 October 2016
- Stages: 4
- Distance: 555 km (344.9 mi)
- Winning time: 12h 27' 34"

Results
	Winner	Tanel Kangert (EST)
	Second	Nicolas Roche (IRL)
	Third	Diego Ulissi (ITA)
	Points	Mark Cavendish (GBR)
	Youth	Julien Bernard (FRA)
	Sprints	Jens Keukeleire (BEL)
	Team	ONE Pro Cycling

The second edition of the Abu Dhabi Tour took place from 20 to 23 October 2016. It was part of the 2016 UCI Asia Tour, ranked as a 2.HC category event.

== Teams ==
Eighteen teams entered the race. Each team had a maximum of six riders.

UCI WorldTeams

- Astana
- BMC Racing Team
- Team Dimension Data
- Team Giant–Alpecin
- Lampre–Merida
- Lotto–Soudal
- Movistar Team
- Team Sky
- Tinkoff
- Trek–Segafredo
- Orica–BikeExchange

UCI Professional Continental teams

- CCC–Sprandi–Polkowice
- ONE Pro Cycling
- Gazprom–RusVelo
- Wilier Triestina–Southeast

UCI Continental teams

- Minsk Cycling Club
- WIGGINS
- Al Nasr Pro Cycling Team–Dubai

== Route ==
The race consisted of four stages in the United Arab Emirates.

Stage characteristics and winners
Stage	Date	Course	Distance	Type	Stage winner
1	20 October	Madinat Zayed to Madinat Zayed	147 km (91 mi)	Flat stage	Giacomo Nizzolo (ITA)
2	21 October	Abu Dhabi to Abu Dhabi	115 km (71 mi)	Flat stage	Mark Cavendish (GBR)
3	22 October	Al Ain to Jebel Hafeet	150 km (93 mi)	Medium mountain stage	Tanel Kangert (EST)
4	23 October	Yas Marina Circuit to Yas Marina Circuit	143 km (89 mi)	Flat stage	Mark Cavendish (GBR)

== Stages ==
=== Stage 1 ===
Stage 1 result

Rank	Rider	Team	Time
1	Giacomo Nizzolo (ITA)	Trek–Segafredo	3h 15' 59"
2	John Degenkolb (GER)	Team Giant–Alpecin	s.t.
3	Mark Cavendish (GBR)	Team Dimension Data	s.t.
4	Magnus Cort (DEN)	Orica–BikeExchange	s.t.
5	Christopher Latham (GBR)	WIGGINS	s.t.
6	Michael Kolář (SVK)	Tinkoff	s.t.
7	Roman Maikin (RUS)	Gazprom–RusVelo	s.t.
8	Marco Coledan (ITA)	Trek–Segafredo	s.t.
9	Jempy Drucker (LUX)	BMC Racing Team	s.t.
10	Ramon Sinkeldam (NED)	Team Giant–Alpecin	s.t.

General classification after Stage 1

Rank	Rider	Team	Time
1	Giacomo Nizzolo (ITA)	Trek–Segafredo	3h 15' 49"
2	John Degenkolb (GER)	Team Giant–Alpecin	+ 4"
3	Mark Cavendish (GBR)	Team Dimension Data	+ 6"
4	Jens Keukeleire (BEL)	Orica–BikeExchange	+ 7"
5	Dion Smith (NZL)	ONE Pro Cycling	+ 9"
6	Magnus Cort (DEN)	Orica–BikeExchange	+ 10"
7	Christopher Latham (GBR)	WIGGINS	s.t.
8	Michael Kolář (SVK)	Tinkoff	s.t.
9	Roman Maikin (RUS)	Gazprom–RusVelo	s.t.
10	Marco Coledan (ITA)	Trek–Segafredo	s.t.

=== Stage 2 ===
Stage 2 result

Rank	Rider	Team	Time
1	Mark Cavendish (GBR)	Team Dimension Data	2h 32' 21"
2	Elia Viviani (ITA)	Team Sky	s.t.
3	Andrea Guardini (ITA)	Astana	s.t.
4	Jakub Mareczko (ITA)	Wilier Triestina–Southeast	s.t.
5	Jempy Drucker (LUX)	BMC Racing Team	s.t.
6	Giacomo Nizzolo (ITA)	Trek–Segafredo	s.t.
7	Christopher Latham (GBR)	WIGGINS	s.t.
8	Michael Kolář (SVK)	Tinkoff	s.t.
9	Steele Von Hoff (AUS)	ONE Pro Cycling	s.t.
10	Magnus Cort (DEN)	Orica–BikeExchange	s.t.

General classification after Stage 2

Rank	Rider	Team	Time
1	Mark Cavendish (GBR)	Team Dimension Data	5h 48' 06"
2	Giacomo Nizzolo (ITA)	Trek–Segafredo	+ 4"
3	Jens Keukeleire (BEL)	Orica–BikeExchange	+ 5"
4	Elia Viviani (ITA)	Team Sky	+ 8"
5	John Degenkolb (GER)	Team Giant–Alpecin	s.t.
6	Andrea Guardini (ITA)	Astana	+ 10"
7	Dion Smith (NZL)	ONE Pro Cycling	s.t.
8	Christopher Latham (GBR)	WIGGINS	+ 14"
9	Jempy Drucker (LUX)	BMC Racing Team	s.t.
10	Michael Kolář (SVK)	Tinkoff	s.t.

=== Stage 3 ===
Stage 3 result

Rank	Rider	Team	Time
1	Tanel Kangert (EST)	Astana	3h 31' 31"
2	Nicolas Roche (IRL)	Team Sky	+ 17"
3	Mekseb Debesay (ERI)	Team Dimension Data	+ 33"
4	Diego Ulissi (ITA)	Lampre–Merida	s.t.
5	Alberto Contador (ESP)	Tinkoff	+ 50"
6	Vincenzo Nibali (ITA)	Astana	s.t.
7	Julien Bernard (FRA)	Trek–Segafredo	+ 52"
8	Ben Hermans (BEL)	BMC Racing Team	+ 1' 19"
9	Martijn Tusveld (NED)	Rabobank Development Team	+ 1' 28"
10	Jesper Hansen (DEN)	Tinkoff	s.t.

General classification after Stage 3

Rank	Rider	Team	Time
1	Tanel Kangert (EST)	Astana	9h 19' 44"
2	Nicolas Roche (IRL)	Team Sky	+ 21"
3	Diego Ulissi (ITA)	Lampre–Merida	+ 43"
4	Vincenzo Nibali (ITA)	Astana	+ 1' 00"
5	Alberto Contador (ESP)	Tinkoff	s.t.
6	Julien Bernard (FRA)	Trek–Segafredo	+ 1' 02"
7	Ben Hermans (BEL)	BMC Racing Team	+ 1' 29"
8	Martijn Tusveld (NED)	Rabobank Development Team	+ 1' 38"
9	Winner Anacona (COL)	Movistar Team	s.t.
10	Jesper Hansen (DEN)	Tinkoff	s.t.

=== Stage 4 ===
Stage 4 result

Rank	Rider	Team	Time
1	Mark Cavendish (GBR)	Team Dimension Data	3h 07' 44"
2	Giacomo Nizzolo (ITA)	Trek–Segafredo	s.t.
3	Elia Viviani (ITA)	Team Sky	s.t.
4	Magnus Cort (DEN)	Orica–BikeExchange	s.t.
5	Jempy Drucker (LUX)	BMC Racing Team	s.t.
6	Ramon Sinkeldam (NED)	Team Giant–Alpecin	s.t.
7	Michael Matthews (AUS)	Orica–BikeExchange	s.t.
8	Sacha Modolo (ITA)	Lampre–Merida	s.t.
9	Mark Renshaw (AUS)	Team Dimension Data	s.t.
10	Michael Kolář (SVK)	Tinkoff	s.t.

== Result ==
Final general classification

Rank	Rider	Team	Time
1	Tanel Kangert (EST)	Astana	12h 27' 34"
2	Nicolas Roche (IRL)	Team Sky	+ 21"
3	Diego Ulissi (ITA)	Lampre–Merida	+ 43"
4	Vincenzo Nibali (ITA)	Astana	+ 1' 00"
5	Alberto Contador (ESP)	Tinkoff	s.t.
6	Julien Bernard (FRA)	Trek–Segafredo	+ 1' 02"
7	Ben Hermans (BEL)	BMC Racing Team	+ 1' 29"
8	Martijn Tusveld (NED)	Rabobank Development Team	+ 1' 38"
9	Winner Anacona (COL)	Movistar Team	s.t.
10	Jesper Hansen (DEN)	Tinkoff	s.t.
