= Samuel Williams =

Samuel Williams may refer to:

== Politics ==
- Samuel Crowdson Williams (1812–1862), American politician, businessman, and soldier in Virginia
- Samuel L. Williams (1933–1994), president of the Los Angeles Board of Police Commissioners
- Samuel May Williams (1795–1858), American businessman and politician
- Samuel Walker Williams (1848–1921), Virginia attorney general, politician and judge
- Samuel Williams (American politician) (1851–1913), American politician
- Samuel Williams (Australian politician) (1878–1962), New South Wales politician
- Samuel Williams (British politician) (1842–1926), British politician
- Samuel Williams (Georgia politician)

== Religion ==
- Samuel Williams (minister) (1743–1817), American minister and educator
- Samuel Williams (missionary) (1822–1907), New Zealand missionary, farmer, educationalist, and pastoralist
- Samuel Wells Williams (1812–1884), linguist, missionary and sinologist from the United States
- Samuel Woodrow Williams (1912–1970), African American Baptist minister, professor and civil rights activist

== Other ==
- Samuel Williams (American author) (died 1881), American newspaper editor and author
- Samuel Williams (cyclist) (born 1994), English racing cyclist
- Samuel Williams (engraver) (1788–1853), English artist
- Samuel Williams (rugby union), English rugby union player
- Samuel Cole Williams (1864–1947), Tennessee jurist, historian, educator, and businessman
- Samuel Tankersley Williams (1896–1984), United States Army Lieutenant General
- Samuel "Savoirfaire" Williams, American jazz violinist
- Samuel Laing Williams (1857–1921), first African American to graduate from the law school of the George Washington University
- Samuel Williams (1852–?), American slave narrative author with the pen name Sam Aleckson

== See also ==
- Sam Williams (disambiguation)
