= Martijn Tusveld =

Dutch cyclist (born 1993)

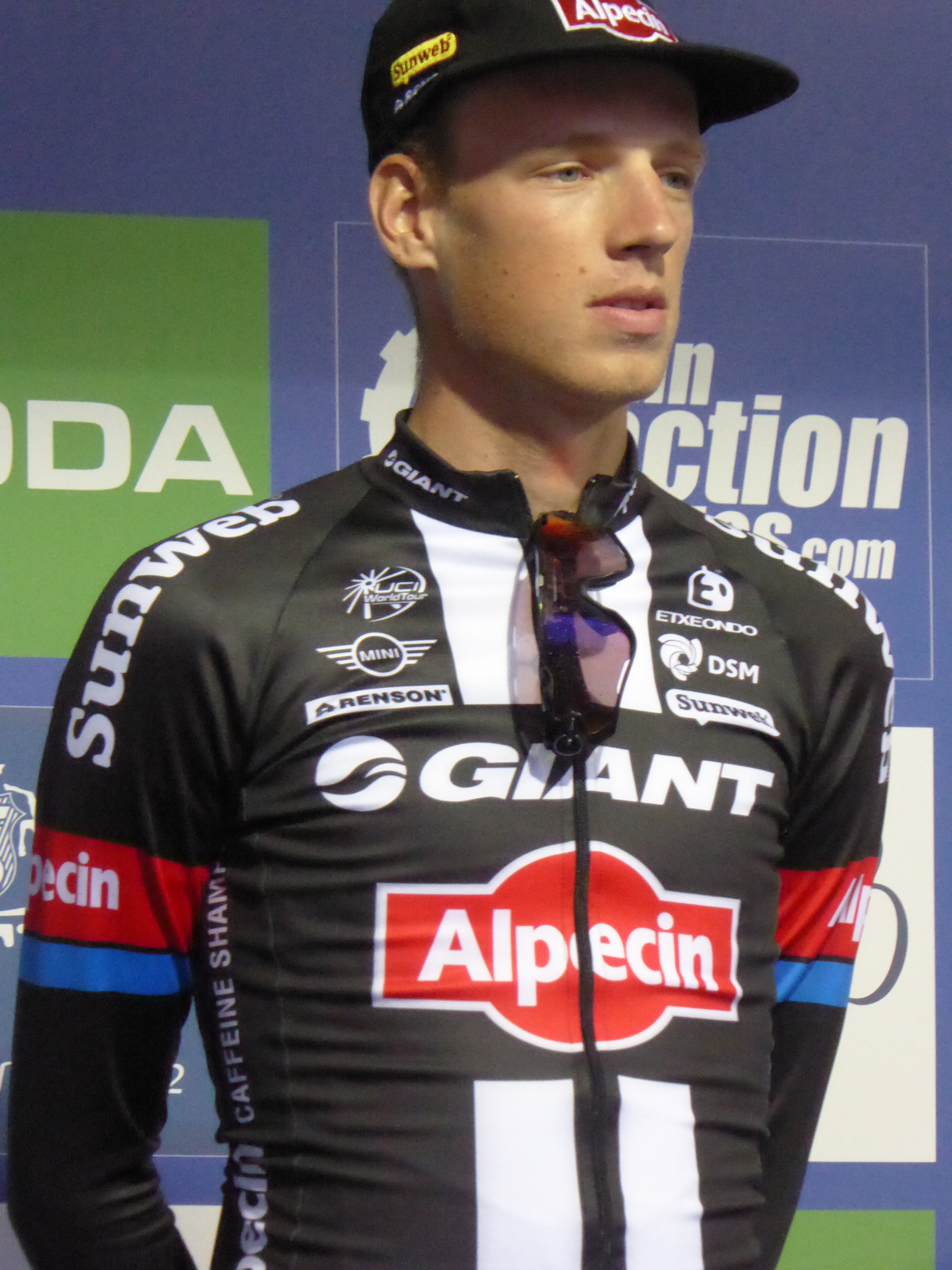
- Tusveld at the 2016 Tour of Britain.

Personal information
- Born: 9 September 1993 (age 33) Utrecht, Netherlands
- Height: 1.87 m (6 ft 2 in)
- Weight: 70 kg (154 lb)

Cycling career
- Sport: Cycling
- Discipline: Road
- Role: Rider
- Rider type: Climber

Professional teams
- 2012–2016: Rabobank Continental Team
- 2014: → Belkin Pro Cycling (stagiaire)
- 2016: → Team Giant–Alpecin (stagiaire)
- 2017: Roompot–Nederlandse Loterij
- 2018–2024: Team Sunweb

Martijn Tusveld (born 9 September 1993) is a Dutch racing cyclist, who last rode for UCI WorldTeam Team dsm–firmenich PostNL. He rode at the 2014 UCI Road World Championships. In August 2018, he was named in the startlist for the Vuelta a España. In October 2020, he was named in the startlist for the 2020 Giro d'Italia.

== Major results ==
2012
10th Overall Tour of China I
2013
1st Young rider classification Rhône-Alpes Isère Tour
3rd Time trial, National Under-23 Road Championships
4th Liège–Bastogne–Liège U23
2014
2nd Paris–Tours Espoirs
2015
2nd Time trial, National Under-23 Road Championships
2nd Paris–Tours Espoirs
3rd Piccolo Giro di Lombardia
8th Overall Olympia's Tour
9th Trofej Umag
9th Liège–Bastogne–Liège U23
10th Overall Le Triptyque des Monts et Châteaux
2016
1st Mountains classification Ronde van Midden-Nederland
2nd Overall Istrian Spring Trophy

1st Stage 2

4th Overall Tour de Normandie

1st Young rider classification

8th Overall Abu Dhabi Tour
2017
10th Overall Tour of Austria
10th Overall Circuit de la Sarthe
2019
10th Overall Tour of Guangxi
2021
1st Mountains classification Tour des Alpes-Maritimes et du Var

=== Grand Tour general classification results timeline ===
Grand Tour	2018	2019	2020	2021	2022	2023
Giro d'Italia	—	—	26	—	43	DNF
Tour de France	—	—	—	—	64	
Vuelta a España	80	26	—	34	—	

Legend
—	Did not compete
DNF	Did not finish
IP	In progress
