= 2020 Coppa Sabatini =

- 2020 UCI ProSeries

Race details
- Dates: 17 September 2020
- Stages: 1
- Distance: 210.1 km (130.6 mi)
- Winning time: 4h 58' 58"

Results
	Winner	Dion Smith (NZL)	(Mitchelton–Scott)
	Second	Andrea Pasqualon (ITA)	(Circus–Wanty Gobert)
	Third	Aleksandr Riabushenko (BLR)	(UAE Team Emirates)

The 2020 Coppa Sabatini (also known as the Gran Premio città di Peccioli) was the 68th edition of the Coppa Sabatini road cycling one day race, which was held on 17 September 2020 as part of the 2020 UCI ProSeries calendar.

== Teams ==
Eight of the 18 UCI WorldTeams, nine UCI ProTeams, three UCI Continental teams and the Italian national team made up the 21 teams that participated in the race. In total 144 riders started the race, of which 96 finished.

UCI WorldTeams

- Bahrain–McLaren
- Ineos Grenadiers
- Israel Start-Up Nation
- Lotto–Soudal
- Mitchelton–Scott
- Movistar Team
- NTT Pro Cycling
- UAE Team Emirates

UCI ProTeams

- Arkéa–Samsic
- Androni Giocattoli–Sidermec
- Bardiani–CSF–Faizanè
- Circus–Wanty Gobert
- Caja Rural–Seguros RGA
- Euskaltel–Euskadi
- Gazprom–RusVelo
- Nippo–Delko–One Provence
- Vini Zabù–Brado–KTM

UCI Continental Teams

- Colombia Tierra de Atletas–GW Bicicletas
- D'Amico–UM Tools
- Sangemini–Trevigiani–MG.K Vis

National team

- Italy

== Result ==
Result
Rank	Rider	Team	Time
1	Dion Smith (NZL)	Mitchelton–Scott	4h 58' 58"
2	Andrea Pasqualon (ITA)	Circus–Wanty Gobert	+ 0"
3	Aleksandr Riabushenko (BLR)	UAE Team Emirates	+ 0"
4	Jacopo Mosca (ITA)	Italy	+ 0"
5	Mads Würtz Schmidt (DEN)	Israel Start-Up Nation	+ 0"
6	Nicola Conci (ITA)	Italy	+ 0"
7	Enrico Battaglin (ITA)	Bahrain–McLaren	+ 0"
8	Alessandro Covi (ITA)	UAE Team Emirates	+ 0"
9	Ethan Hayter (GBR)	Ineos Grenadiers	+ 0"
10	Carlos Barbero (ESP)	NTT Pro Cycling	+ 0"
