= 2021 Tour des Alpes-Maritimes et du Var =

2021 UCI Europe Tour

Race details
- Dates: 19–21 February 2021
- Stages: 3
- Distance: 498.5 km (309.8 mi)
- Winning time: 12h 51' 00"

Results
Jersey awarded to the overall winner	Winner	Gianluca Brambilla (ITA)	(Trek–Segafredo)
	Second	Michael Woods (CAN)	(Israel Start-Up Nation)
	Third	Bauke Mollema (NED)	(Trek–Segafredo)
Jersey awarded to the points classification winner	Points	Bauke Mollema (NED)	(Trek–Segafredo)
Jersey awarded to the mountains classification winner	Mountains	Martijn Tusveld (NED)	(Team DSM)
Jersey awarded to the youth classification winner	Youth	David Gaudu (FRA)	(Groupama–FDJ)
	Team	Groupama–FDJ	

The 2021 Tour des Alpes-Maritimes et du Var was a road cycling stage race that took place between 19 and 21 February 2021 in the French departments of Alpes-Maritimes and Var. The race was rated as a 2.1 event as part of the 2021 UCI Europe Tour and was the 53rd edition of the Tour des Alpes-Maritimes et du Var cycling race.

Italian rider Gianluca Brambilla of Trek–Segafredo won the race, with Canadian rider Michael Woods of Israel Start-Up Nation in second and Brambilla's Dutch teammate Bauke Mollema in third. Mollema won the first stage, beating a reduced peloton in a sprint up the third ascent of the Col de Gourdon and taking the first leader's jersey. Woods, who had finished fourth on the first stage only one second behind Mollema, won on the short but steep final climb in Fayence on stage two with enough of a margin over Mollema, who had finished second, to take over the leader's jersey. Heading into the final stage, Brambilla had managed to keep pace with the race leaders; despite being in 17th place, he was only 13 seconds behind Woods. Brambilla was a part of the third stage's main breakaway group of 16 riders, but as the group began to disintegrate on the last categorized climb, the Col de la Madone, he attacked, with only Valentin Madouas able to follow. With around 11 kilometers left, he attacked again, and this time Madouas was unable to keep up. Brambilla pushed on over the last climb, the uncategorized Col de Nice, and managed to hold on for the stage win. Despite Woods' best efforts to maintain his lead, he and Mollema finished in a group 18 seconds behind Brambilla, giving the Italian the overall win.

== Teams ==
Eleven of the nineteen UCI WorldTeams, eight UCI ProTeams, and three UCI Continental teams made up the twenty-two teams that participated in the race. Each team could enter a roster of up to seven riders, but the only teams not to enter the maximum allowed roster were Alpecin–Fenix, Arkéa–Samsic, St. Michel–Auber93, and Xelliss–Roubaix–Lille Métropole; each of these teams entered six riders. From a total of 150 riders, 117 finished the race.

UCI WorldTeams

- AG2R Citroën Team
- Astana–Premier Tech
- Cofidis
- EF Education–Nippo
- Groupama–FDJ
- Ineos Grenadiers
- Israel Start-Up Nation
- Team DSM
- Team Qhubeka Assos
- Trek–Segafredo
- UAE Team Emirates

UCI ProTeams

- Alpecin–Fenix
- Arkéa–Samsic
- B&B Hotels p/b KTM
- Bingoal WB
- Burgos BH
- Delko
- Equipo Kern Pharma
- Total Direct Énergie

UCI Continental Teams

- St. Michel–Auber93
- Swiss Racing Academy
- Xelliss–Roubaix–Lille Métropole

== Route ==
Stage characteristics and winners
Stage	Date	Course	Distance	Type	Stage winner
1	19 February	Biot to Gourdon	186.8 km (116.1 mi)	Mountain stage	Bauke Mollema (NED)
2	20 February	Fayence to Fayence	175.7 km (109.2 mi)	Hilly stage	Michael Woods (CAN)
3	21 February	Blausasc to Blausasc	136 km (85 mi)	Mountain stage	Gianluca Brambilla (ITA)
Total		498.5 km (309.8 mi)			

== Stages ==
=== Stage 1 ===
19 February 2021 – Biot to Gourdon, 186.8 km (116.1 mi)

Stage 1 Result
Rank	Rider	Team	Time
1	Bauke Mollema (NED)	Trek–Segafredo	4h 50' 20"
2	Greg Van Avermaet (BEL)	AG2R Citroën Team	+ 1"
3	Valentin Madouas (FRA)	Groupama–FDJ	+ 1"
4	Michael Woods (CAN)	Israel Start-Up Nation	+ 1"
5	Giulio Ciccone (ITA)	Trek–Segafredo	+ 1"
6	Dorian Godon (FRA)	AG2R Citroën Team	+ 1"
7	Rudy Molard (FRA)	Groupama–FDJ	+ 1"
8	Jesús Herrada (ESP)	Cofidis	+ 1"
9	Thibaut Pinot (FRA)	Groupama–FDJ	+ 1"
10	David Gaudu (FRA)	Groupama–FDJ	+ 1"

General classification after Stage 1
Rank	Rider	Team	Time
1	Bauke Mollema (NED)	Trek–Segafredo	4h 50' 20"
2	Greg Van Avermaet (BEL)	AG2R Citroën Team	+ 1"
3	Valentin Madouas (FRA)	Groupama–FDJ	+ 1"
4	Michael Woods (CAN)	Israel Start-Up Nation	+ 1"
5	Giulio Ciccone (ITA)	Trek–Segafredo	+ 1"
6	Dorian Godon (FRA)	AG2R Citroën Team	+ 1"
7	Rudy Molard (FRA)	Groupama–FDJ	+ 1"
8	Jesús Herrada (ESP)	Cofidis	+ 1"
9	Thibaut Pinot (FRA)	Groupama–FDJ	+ 1"
10	David Gaudu (FRA)	Groupama–FDJ	+ 1"

=== Stage 2 ===
20 February 2021 – Fayence to Fayence, 175.7 km (109.2 mi)

Stage 2 Result
Rank	Rider	Team	Time
1	Michael Woods (CAN)	Israel Start-Up Nation	4h 16' 54"
2	Bauke Mollema (NED)	Trek–Segafredo	+ 2"
3	Jhonatan Narváez (ECU)	Ineos Grenadiers	+ 4"
4	David Gaudu (FRA)	Groupama–FDJ	+ 7"
5	Alexis Vuillermoz (FRA)	Total Direct Énergie	+ 10"
6	Rudy Molard (FRA)	Groupama–FDJ	+ 10"
7	Ben O'Connor (AUS)	AG2R Citroën Team	+ 11"
8	Jesús Herrada (ESP)	Cofidis	+ 13"
9	Arjen Livyns (BEL)	Bingoal WB	+ 13"
10	Pavel Sivakov (RUS)	Ineos Grenadiers	+ 13"

General classification after Stage 2
Rank	Rider	Team	Time
1	Michael Woods (CAN)	Israel Start-Up Nation	9h 07' 15"
2	Bauke Mollema (NED)	Trek–Segafredo	+ 1"
3	David Gaudu (FRA)	Groupama–FDJ	+ 7"
4	Rudy Molard (FRA)	Groupama–FDJ	+ 10"
5	Ben O'Connor (AUS)	AG2R Citroën Team	+ 11"
6	Jesús Herrada (ESP)	Cofidis	+ 13"
7	Giulio Ciccone (ITA)	Trek–Segafredo	+ 13"
8	Valentin Madouas (FRA)	Groupama–FDJ	+ 13"
9	Arjen Livyns (BEL)	Bingoal WB	+ 13"
10	Nairo Quintana (COL)	Arkéa–Samsic	+ 13"

=== Stage 3 ===
21 February 2021 – Blausasc to Blausasc, 136 km (85 mi)

Stage 3 Result
Rank	Rider	Team	Time
1	Gianluca Brambilla (ITA)	Trek–Segafredo	3h 43' 32"
2	Tao Geoghegan Hart (GBR)	Ineos Grenadiers	+ 13"
3	Ben O'Connor (AUS)	AG2R Citroën Team	+ 13"
4	Rudy Molard (FRA)	Groupama–FDJ	+ 13"
5	Valentin Madouas (FRA)	Groupama–FDJ	+ 13"
6	Jakob Fuglsang (DEN)	Astana–Premier Tech	+ 18"
7	David Gaudu (FRA)	Groupama–FDJ	+ 18"
8	Bauke Mollema (NED)	Trek–Segafredo	+ 18"
9	Nairo Quintana (COL)	Arkéa–Samsic	+ 18"
10	Michael Woods (CAN)	Israel Start-Up Nation	+ 18"

General classification after Stage 3
Rank	Rider	Team	Time
1	Gianluca Brambilla (ITA)	Trek–Segafredo	12h 51' 00"
2	Michael Woods (CAN)	Israel Start-Up Nation	+ 5"
3	Bauke Mollema (NED)	Trek–Segafredo	+ 6"
4	Rudy Molard (FRA)	Groupama–FDJ	+ 10"
5	Ben O'Connor (AUS)	AG2R Citroën Team	+ 11"
6	David Gaudu (FRA)	Groupama–FDJ	+ 12"
7	Valentin Madouas (FRA)	Groupama–FDJ	+ 13"
8	Jakob Fuglsang (DEN)	Astana–Premier Tech	+ 18"
9	Nairo Quintana (COL)	Arkéa–Samsic	+ 18"
10	Tao Geoghegan Hart (GBR)	Ineos Grenadiers	+ 26"

== Classification leadership table ==
Classification leadership by stage
Stage	Winner	General classification	Points classification	Mountains classification	Young rider classification	Team classification	Combativity award
1	Bauke Mollema	Bauke Mollema	Bauke Mollema	Krists Neilands	Valentin Madouas	Trek–Segafredo	Otto Vergaerde
2	Michael Woods	Michael Woods	Bauke Mollema	Biniam Girmay	David Gaudu	Trek–Segafredo	Hugo Houle
3	Gianluca Brambilla	Gianluca Brambilla	Bauke Mollema	Martijn Tusveld	David Gaudu	Groupama–FDJ	Rudy Molard
Final		Gianluca Brambilla	Bauke Mollema	Martijn Tusveld	David Gaudu	Groupama–FDJ	Not awarded

== Final classification standings ==
Legend
Denotes the winner of the general classification	Denotes the winner of the young rider classification
Denotes the winner of the points classification	Denotes the winner of the team classification
Denotes the winner of the mountains classification	

=== General classification ===
Final general classification (1–10)
Rank	Rider	Team	Time
1	Gianluca Brambilla (ITA)	Trek–Segafredo	12h 51' 00"
2	Michael Woods (CAN)	Israel Start-Up Nation	+ 5"
3	Bauke Mollema (NED)	Trek–Segafredo	+ 6"
4	Rudy Molard (FRA)	Groupama–FDJ	+ 10"
5	Ben O'Connor (AUS)	AG2R Citroën Team	+ 11"
6	David Gaudu (FRA)	Groupama–FDJ	+ 12"
7	Valentin Madouas (FRA)	Groupama–FDJ	+ 13"
8	Jakob Fuglsang (DEN)	Astana–Premier Tech	+ 18"
9	Nairo Quintana (COL)	Arkéa–Samsic	+ 18"
10	Tao Geoghegan Hart (GBR)	Ineos Grenadiers	+ 26"

=== Points classification ===
Final points classification (1–10)
Rank	Rider	Team	Points
1	Bauke Mollema (NED)	Trek–Segafredo	53
2	Michael Woods (CAN)	Israel Start-Up Nation	45
3	Rudy Molard (FRA)	Groupama–FDJ	33
4	David Gaudu (FRA)	Groupama–FDJ	29
5	Valentin Madouas (FRA)	Groupama–FDJ	28
6	Gianluca Brambilla (ITA)	Trek–Segafredo	25
7	Ben O'Connor (AUS)	AG2R Citroën Team	25
8	Tao Geoghegan Hart (GBR)	Ineos Grenadiers	20
9	Greg Van Avermaet (BEL)	AG2R Citroën Team	20
10	Jesús Herrada (ESP)	Cofidis	16

=== Mountains classification ===
Final mountains classification (1–10)
Rank	Rider	Team	Points
1	Martijn Tusveld (NED)	Team DSM	25
2	Valentin Madouas (FRA)	Groupama–FDJ	22
3	Rudy Molard (FRA)	Groupama–FDJ	20
4	Biniam Girmay (ERI)	Delko	16
5	Gianluca Brambilla (ITA)	Trek–Segafredo	15
6	David de la Cruz (ESP)	UAE Team Emirates	15
7	Andrea Mifsud (FRA)	Swiss Racing Academy	14
8	Krists Neilands (LAT)	Israel Start-Up Nation	10
9	Bruno Armirail (FRA)	Groupama–FDJ	10
10	Tao Geoghegan Hart (GBR)	Ineos Grenadiers	8

=== Young rider classification ===
Final young rider classification (1–10)
Rank	Rider	Team	Time
1	David Gaudu (FRA)	Groupama–FDJ	12h 51' 12"
2	Valentin Madouas (FRA)	Groupama–FDJ	+ 1"
3	Clément Champoussin (FRA)	AG2R Citroën Team	+ 1' 26"
4	Michael Storer (AUS)	Team DSM	+ 3' 30"
5	Pavel Sivakov (RUS)	Ineos Grenadiers	+ 3' 41"
6	Ben Tulett (GBR)	Alpecin–Fenix	+ 3' 41"
7	Harold Tejada (COL)	Astana–Premier Tech	+ 3' 41"
8	Simon Carr (GBR)	EF Education–Nippo	+ 3' 54"
9	Laurens Huys (BEL)	Bingoal WB	+ 10' 34"
10	Dorian Godon (FRA)	AG2R Citroën Team	+ 11' 24"

=== Team classification ===
Final team classification (1–10)
Rank	Team	Time
1	Groupama–FDJ	38h 33' 35"
2	Astana–Premier Tech	+ 5' 34"
3	Ineos Grenadiers	+ 7' 28"
4	Trek–Segafredo	+ 7' 50"
5	AG2R Citroën Team	+ 11' 48"
6	Israel Start-Up Nation	+ 17' 32"
7	Alpecin–Fenix	+ 22' 45"
8	Team Qhubeka Assos	+ 24' 30"
9	Total Direct Énergie	+ 26' 09"
10	Cofidis	+ 26' 50"
