= Tom Baylis =

English cyclist

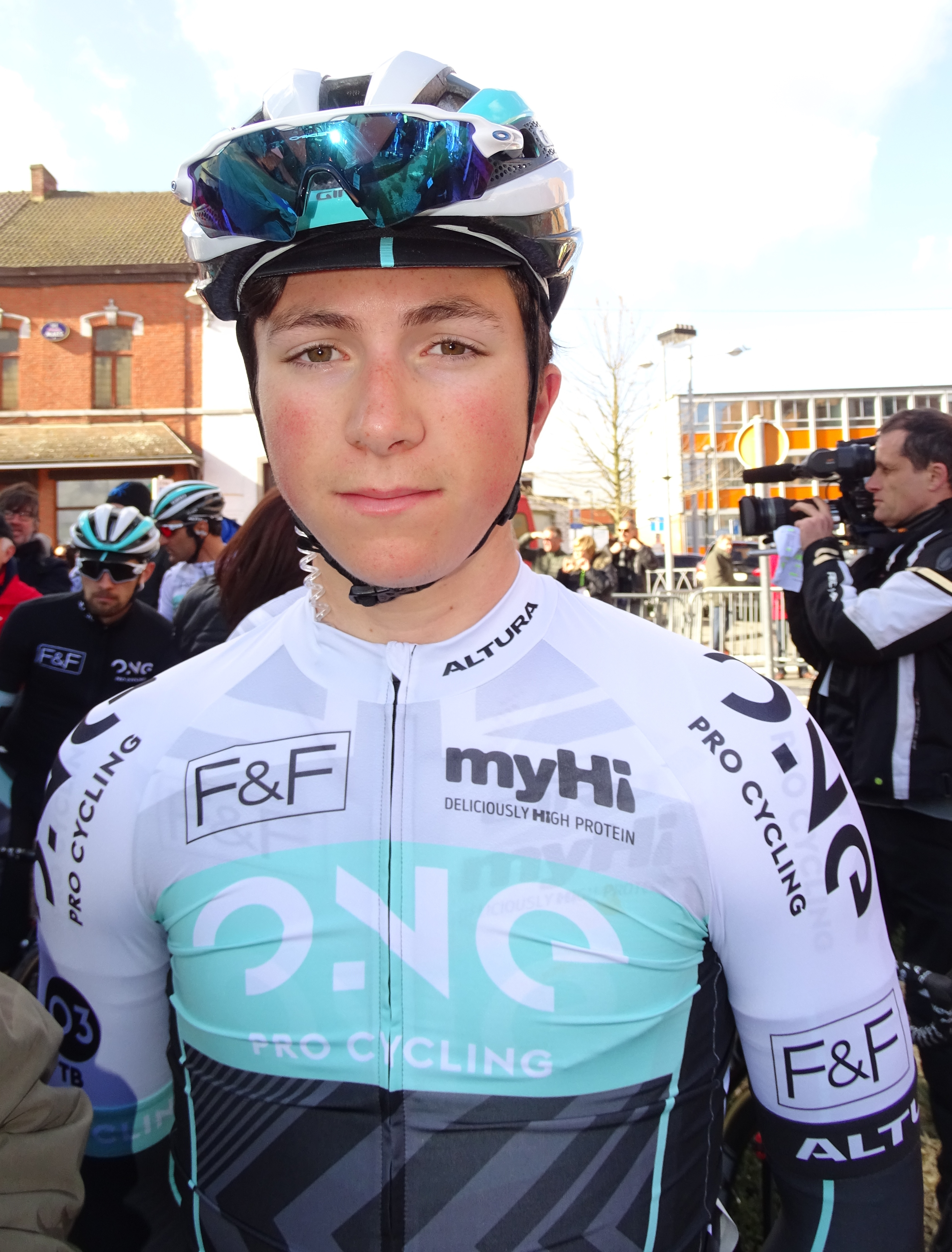

Personal information
- Nickname: Goose
- Born: 3 January 1996 (age 30) Misterton, England
- Height: 190 cm (6 ft 3 in)

Cycling career
- Sport: Cycling
- Current team: Retired
- Discipline: Road
- Role: Rider
- Rider type: Time trialist

Professional team
- 2015–2018: ONE Pro Cycling

Tom Baylis (born 3 January 1996 in Misterton) is an English former racing cyclist who competed for ONE Pro Cycling from 2015 until 2018.

== Major results ==
2015
4th Time trial, National Under–23 Road Championships
2016
1st Stage 1 (TTT) Ronde van Midden-Nederland
5th Time trial, National Under–23 Road Championships
2017
2nd Time trial, National Under–23 Road Championships
3rd Overall Ronde van Midden-Nederland

1st Stage 1 (TTT)

2018
2nd Trofej Umag
