= Sam Williams =

Sam Williams may refer to:

== Sports ==
=== American football ===
- Sam Williams (defensive back) (born 1952), American football player
- Sam Williams (defensive lineman) (1931–2013), American professional football player of the 1960s
- Sam Williams (linebacker) (born 1980), American football linebacker
- Sam Williams (defensive end, born 1999), American football player

=== Basketball ===
- Sam Williams (basketball, born 1924) (1924–2012), American college basketball coach
- Sam Williams (basketball, born 1945), American basketball player for the Milwaukee Bucks
- Sam Williams (basketball, born 1959), American basketball player for the Golden State Warriors and Philadelphia 76ers

=== Other sports ===
- Sam Williams (soccer) (born 2005), American soccer player
- Sam Williams (rugby league) (born 1991), Australian rugby league footballer
- Sam Williams (footballer) (born 1987), English Association footballer
- Sam Williams (baseball) (1922–2007), American Negro leagues baseball player
- Sam Williams (rugby union) (1862–?), rugby union footballer

== Other ==
- Sam Williams (journalist) (born 1969), American journalist
- Sam B. Williams (1921–2009), American inventor
- Big Sam (musician) (Sam Williams), trombonist and band leader from New Orleans
- Sam Williams (singer) (born 1997), American singer-songwriter

== See also ==
- Samuel Williams (disambiguation)
- Sammie Williams, American trombonist and bandleader known as Big Sam (musician)
- Sammy Williams (1948–2018), American actor
- Sammy Williams (American football) (born 1974), American football offensive lineman
