= Peter Williams (cyclist) =

British cyclist (born 1986)

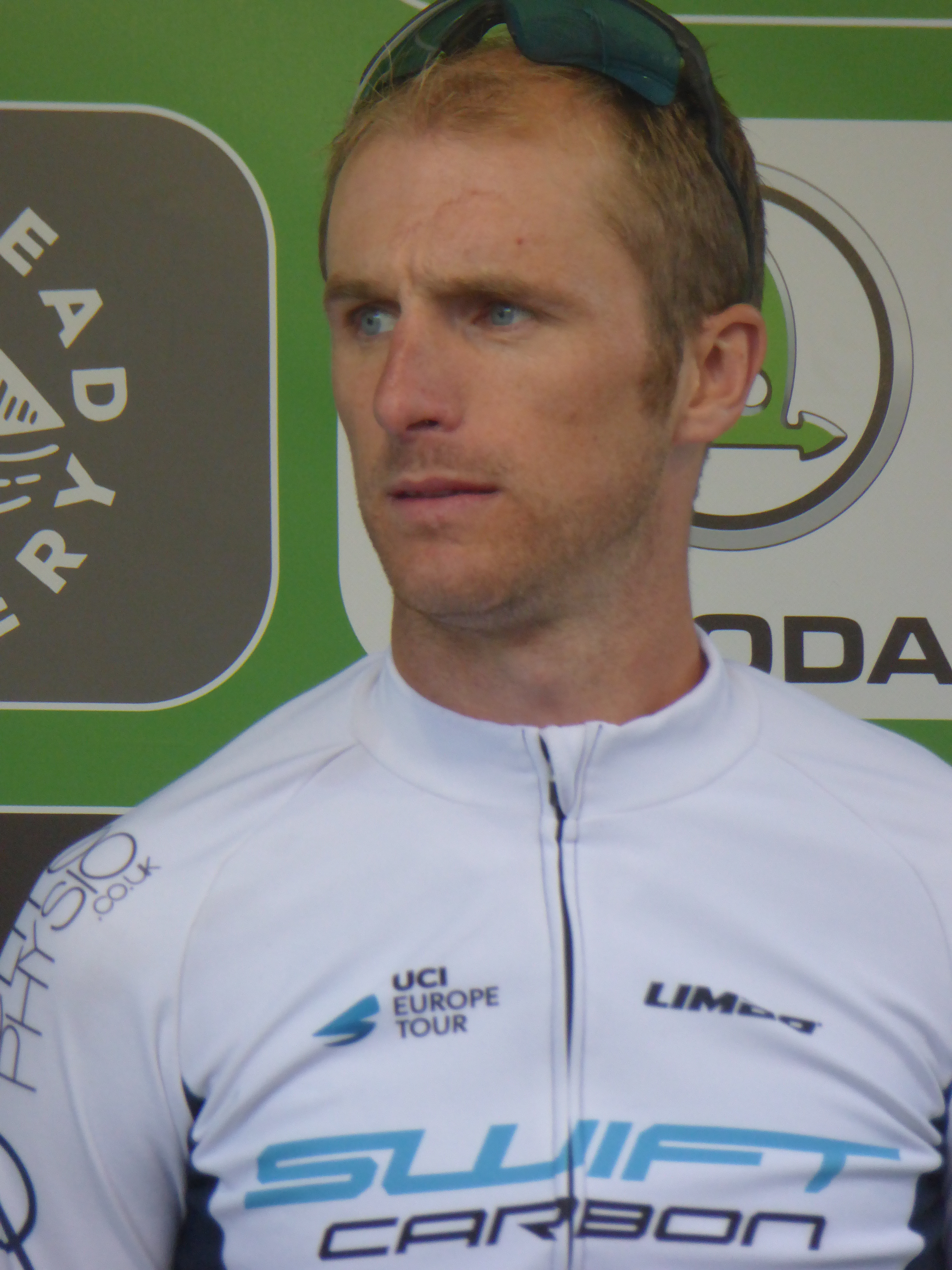
- Williams at the 2019 Tour of Britain

Personal information
- Full name: Peter Scott Williams
- Born: 13 December 1986 (age 39) Southport, Merseyside, England
- Height: 1.75 m (5 ft 9 in)

Cycling career
- Sport: Cycling
- Current team: Retired
- Discipline: Road
- Role: Rider

Amateur team
- 2014: Haribo–Beacon Cycling Team

Professional teams
- 2008–2012: Pinarello Racing Team
- 2013: Team IG–Sigma Sport
- 2015–2018: ONE Pro Cycling
- 2019–2021: SwiftCarbon Pro Cycling

Peter Scott Williams (born 13 December 1986) is a British former racing cyclist, who competed between 2008 and 2021 for British UCI Continental teams Node 4–Giordana Racing, Team IG–Sigma Sport, ONE Pro Cycling and SwiftCarbon Pro Cycling. He won the sprints classification at the Tour of Britain in 2012 and 2015, and also won the mountains classification at the race in 2015.

== Major results ==
2004
Junior Tour of Wales

1st Points classification
1st Mountains classification

2nd Time trial, National Junior Road Championships
2008
2nd Shay Elliott Memorial Race
2nd Beaumont Trophy
2009
1st Overall Tobago International
3rd Overall Girvan Three Day
2010
2nd Overall FBD Insurance Rás
2nd Clayton Velo Spring Classic
3rd Beaumont Trophy
2011
1st Overall Tour of Ulster

1st Stage 2

5th Overall An Post Rás
2012
1st Sprints classification, Tour of Britain
5th Beaumont Trophy
6th Rutland–Melton CiCLE Classic
7th Grand Prix des Marbriers
2013
8th Rutland–Melton CiCLE Classic
2014
8th Overall An Post Rás
2015
1st Clayton Velo Spring Classic
1st Eddie Soens Memorial Handicap
1st Huddersfield Criterium
Tour of Britain

1st Mountains classification
1st Sprints classification

3rd Overall Bałtyk–Karkonosze Tour

1st Stage 1

3rd Ryedale Grand Prix
10th Beaumont Trophy
2016
2nd Tro-Bro Léon
3rd Overall Ronde van Midden-Nederland

1st Stage 1 (TTT)

4th Time trial, National Road Championships
4th Beaumont Trophy
2017
1st Beaumont Trophy
1st Stage 1 (TTT) Ronde van Midden-Nederland
2018
6th Rutland–Melton CiCLE Classic
