= Dion Smith =

New Zealand bicycle racer (born 1993)

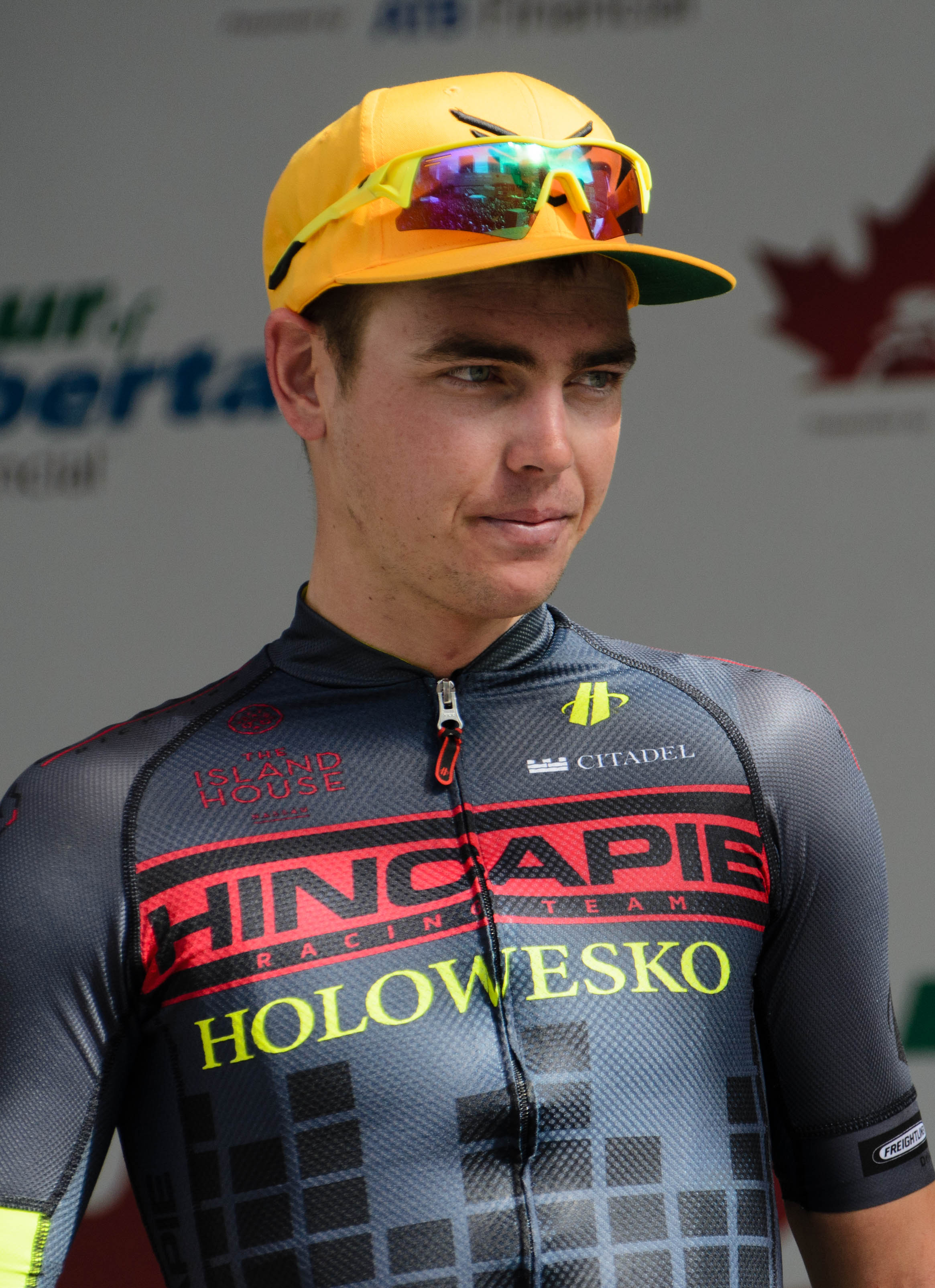
- Smith in 2015

Personal information
- Born: 3 March 1993 (age 33) Taupaki, New Zealand
- Height: 1.79 m (5 ft 10 in)
- Weight: 67 kg (148 lb)

Cycling career
- Sport: Cycling
- Current team: NSN Cycling Team
- Discipline: Road
- Role: Rider
- Rider type: Puncheur

Amateur teams
- 2012: PureBlack Racing
- 2013: Predator Carbon Repair

Professional teams
- 2013: Champion System (stagiaire)
- 2014–2015: Hincapie Sportswear Development Team
- 2016: ONE Pro Cycling
- 2017–2018: Wanty–Groupe Gobert
- 2019–2022: Mitchelton–Scott
- 2023–2025: Intermarché–Circus–Wanty
- 2026-: NSN Cycling Team

Major wins
- One-day races and Classics Coppa Sabatini (2020)

Dion Allan Smith (born 3 March 1993) is a New Zealand cyclist, who currently rides for UCI WorldTeam NSN Cycling Team.

== Career ==
Smith was born in Taupaki in Rodney District. He attended Massey High School.

In September 2015 it was announced that he would join ONE Pro Cycling for the 2016 season. In June 2017, he was named in the startlist for the 2017 Tour de France. In stage six of the race, he was part of the sprint for the finish line and given the same time as the winner, Marcel Kittel. In August 2019, he was named in the startlist for the 2019 Vuelta a España.

In September 2022 it was announced that Smith would join team Intermarché–Circus–Wanty for the 2023 and 2024 season.

== Major results ==
2011
2nd Overall Tour de l'Abitibi
2013
1st Stage 4 McLane Pacific Classic
4th Tour de Delta
6th Philadelphia International Cycling Classic
2014
1st Stage 1 Redlands Bicycle Classic
National Under-23 Road Championships

2nd Road race
3rd Time trial

3rd Philadelphia International Cycling Classic
7th Overall Tour de Beauce
2015
1st Overall Cascade Cycling Classic
2nd Road race, National Under-23 Road Championships
2nd Winston-Salem Cycling Classic Criterium
3rd Overall New Zealand Cycle Classic

1st Young rider classification

3rd Overall Tour de Beauce

1st Points classification
1st Young rider classification

4th Overall Joe Martin Stage Race

1st Young rider classification

5th Overall Tour of Alberta
2016
1st The REV Classic
1st Beaumont Trophy
2nd Road race, National Road Championships
5th Overall Four Days of Dunkirk
5th Overall Ronde van Midden-Nederland

1st Stage 1 (TTT)

5th Grote Prijs Jef Scherens
5th Münsterland Giro
10th Overall Herald Sun Tour
10th Overall Tour de Yorkshire
10th Cadel Evans Great Ocean Road Race
2017
3rd Road race, National Road Championships
2018
2nd Paris–Chauny
3rd Overall Tour of Belgium
8th Coppa Sabatini
Tour de France

Held after Stages 2–4

2019
3rd Japan Cup
2020 (1 pro win)
1st Coppa Sabatini
6th Milan–San Remo
9th Milano–Torino
2021
7th Gran Premio di Lugano
2022
2nd Per sempre Alfredo
2nd Prueba Villafranca de Ordizia
2023
7th Cadel Evans Great Ocean Road Race
2025 (1)
1st Volta NXT Classic

=== Grand Tour general classification results timeline ===
Grand Tour	2017	2018	2019	2020	2021	2022	2023	2024	2025
Giro d'Italia	—	—	—	—	—	—	—	89	DNF
Tour de France	124	97	—	—	—	—	111	—	—
Vuelta a España	—	—	83	74	—	—	—	—	123

Legend
—	Did not compete
DNF	Did not finish
