= Karol Domagalski =

Polish cyclist

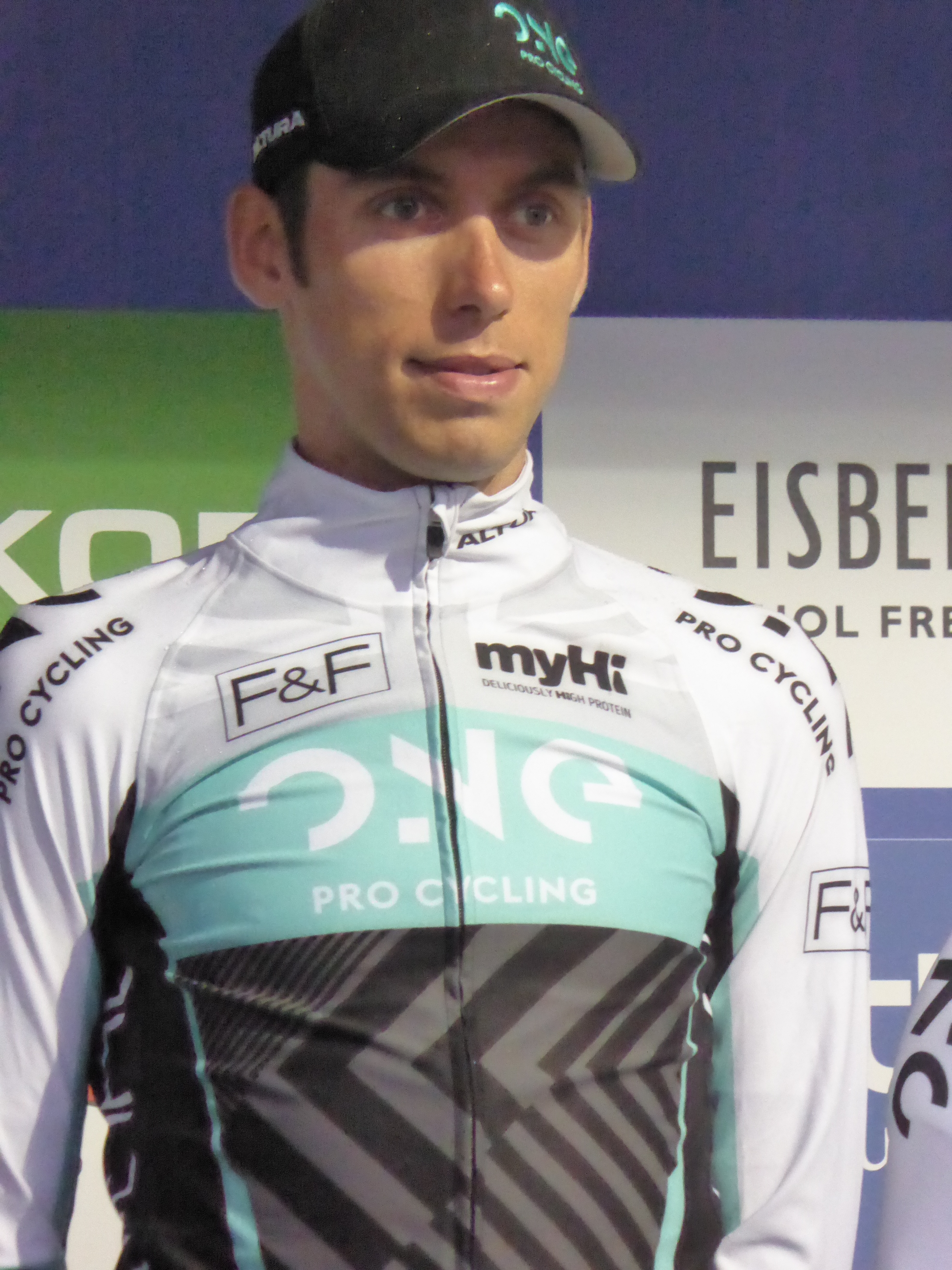
- Domagalski at the 2016 Tour of Britain

Personal information
- Full name: Karol Andrzej Domagalski
- Born: 8 September 1989 (age 37) Skała, Poland
- Height: 1.92 m (6 ft 4 in)
- Weight: 77 kg (170 lb)

Cycling career
- Sport: Cycling
- Current team: Retired
- Discipline: Road
- Role: Rider

Amateur teams
- 2009–2010: Azysa–Conor WRC
- 2011: Caja Rural amateur

Professional teams
- 2012–2014: Caja Rural
- 2015: Team Raleigh
- 2016–2018: ONE Pro Cycling
- 2019–2021: Hurom BDC Development

Karol Andrzej Domagalski (born 8 September 1989) is a Polish former racing cyclist, who rode professionally between 2012 and 2021 for the Caja Rural–Seguros RGA, Team Raleigh, ONE Pro Cycling, and HRE Mazowsze Serce Polski teams. With Caja Rural–Seguros RGA, Domagalski competed at the 2014 Vuelta a España and 2014 Giro di Lombardia.

== Major results ==
2010
7th Overall Vuelta Ciclista a León
8th Overall Cinturó de l'Empordà
2011
3rd Road race, National Under-23 Road Championships
2013
6th Overall Tour of Małopolska
2015
5th Beaumont Trophy
2016
Tour de Korea

1st Stages 3 & 5

2nd Overall Ronde van Midden-Nederland

1st Stage 1 (TTT)

4th Time trial, National Road Championships
6th Velothon Wales
7th Prueba Villafranca de Ordizia
9th Klasika Primavera
2017
1st Grand Prix des Marbriers
1st Stage 1 (TTT) Ronde van Midden-Nederland
2nd Velothon Wales
3rd Overall Szlakiem Walk Majora Hubala
5th Time trial, National Road Championships
2018
2nd Rutland–Melton CiCLE Classic
5th Overall Circuit des Ardennes
5th Overall Tour of Małopolska
2019
7th Overall Szlakiem Walk Majora Hubala
