= 2016 Tro-Bro Léon =

Race details
- Dates: 17 April 2016
- Stages: 1
- Distance: 203.3 km (126.3 mi)
- Winning time: 4h 50' 36"

Results
	Winner	Martin Mortensen (DEN)
	Second	Peter Williams (GBR)
	Third	Florian Vachon (FRA)

The 2016 Tro-Bro Léon was the 33rd edition of the Tro-Bro Léon cycle race and was held on 17 April 2016. The race was won by Martin Mortensen.

== General classification ==
Final general classification

Rank	Rider	Time
1	Martin Mortensen (DEN)	4h 50' 36"
2	Peter Williams (GBR)	+ 0"
3	Florian Vachon (FRA)	+ 0"
4	Laurent Pichon (FRA)	+ 0"
5	Johan Le Bon (FRA)	+ 0"
6	Yohann Gène (FRA)	+ 4"
7	Baptiste Planckaert (BEL)	+ 17"
8	Dimitri Claeys (BEL)	+ 17"
9	Mihkel Räim (EST)	+ 17"
10	Sébastien Minard (NED)	+ 20"
