= Samuel Williams (cyclist) =

English cyclist (born 1994)

Sam Williams
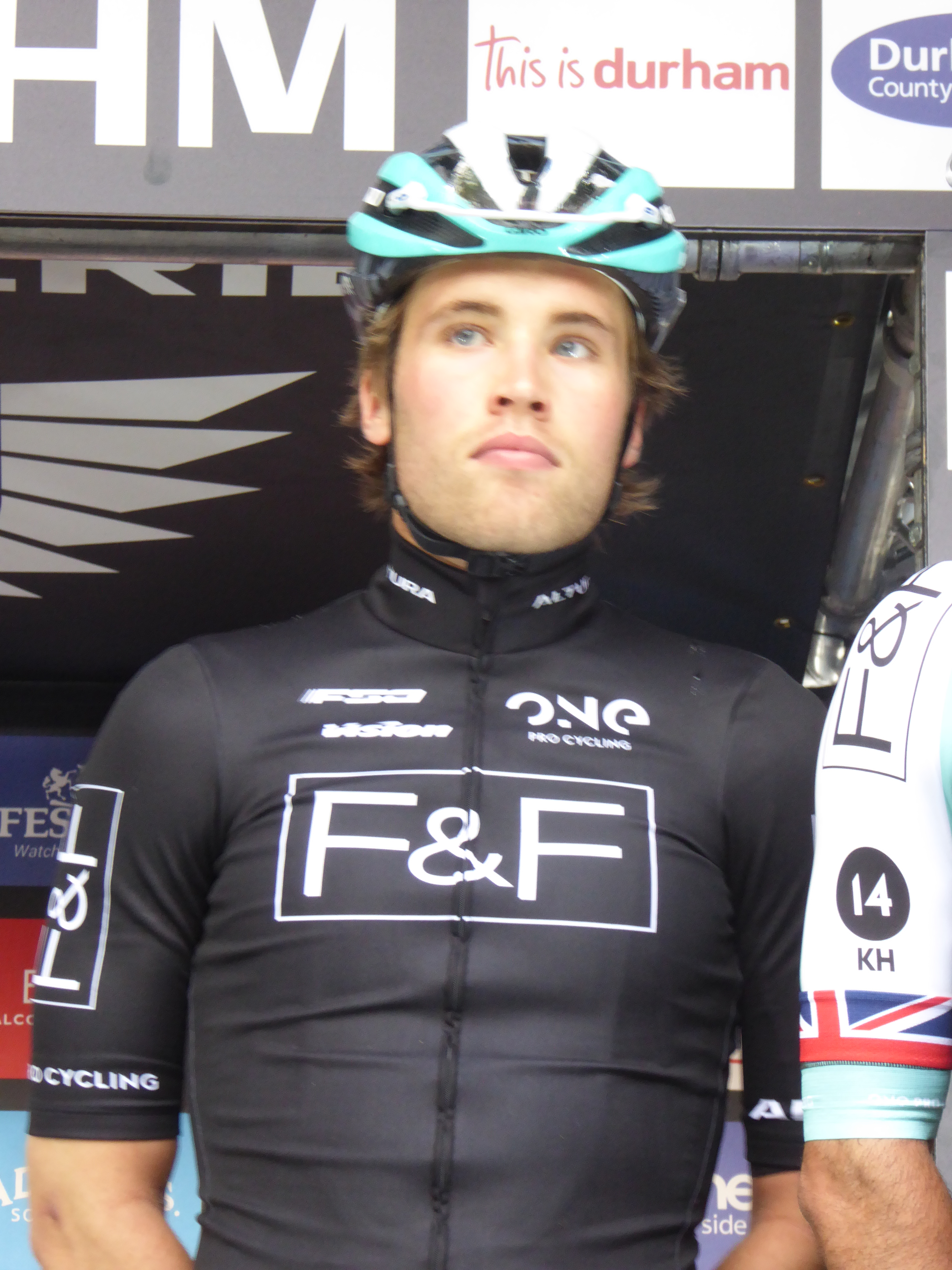
- Williams in 2017.

Personal information
- Full name: Samuel Williams
- Born: 18 March 1994 (age 32) Worcester, England

Cycling career
- Sport: Cycling
- Current team: Saint Piran
- Discipline: Road
- Role: Rider

Amateur team
- 2018–: Saint Piran

Professional teams
- 2014: NFTO
- 2015–2017: ONE Pro Cycling

Samuel Williams (born 18 March 1994 in Worcester) is an English racing cyclist, riding for Saint Piran.
