= Steele Von Hoff =

Australian racing cyclist (born 1987)

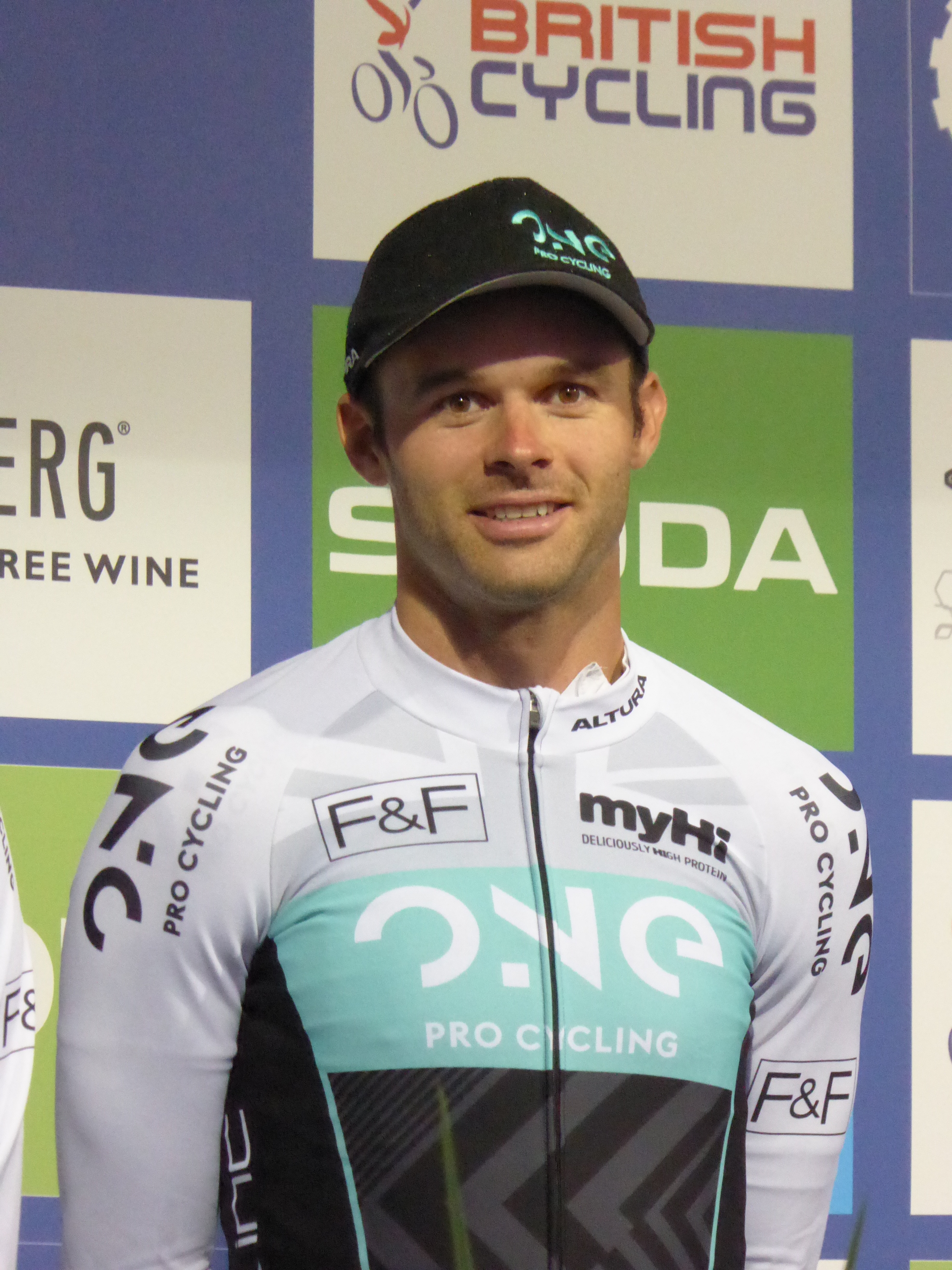
- Von Hoff in 2016

Personal information
- Full name: Steele Von Hoff
- Nickname: Stainless
- Born: 31 December 1987 (age 38) Mornington, Victoria, Australia
- Height: 1.80 m (5 ft 11 in)
- Weight: 70 kg (154 lb)

Cycling career
- Sport: Cycling
- Discipline: Road
- Role: Rider
- Rider type: Sprinter

Amateur teams
- 2009–2010: Torq Performance Nutrition
- 2011: Genesys Wealth Advisers
- 2012: Chipotle–First Solar Development Team
- 2012: Garmin–Sharp (stagiaire)
- 2019: Team Relentless
- 2020–2021: InForm TM Insight MAKE

Professional teams
- 2013–2014: Garmin–Sharp
- 2015: NFTO
- 2016–2017: ONE Pro Cycling
- 2018: Bennelong SwissWellness Cycling Team

Major wins
- National Criterium Championships (2014, 2015)
Medal record
Men's road cycling
Representing Australia
Commonwealth Games
Gold medal – first place	2018 Gold Coast	Road race

Steele Von Hoff (born 31 December 1987) is an Australian road racing cyclist, who most recently rode for Australian amateur team InForm TMX MAKE. In 2018, Von Hoff won the gold medal in the road race at the Commonwealth Games.

== Career ==
In 2011, Von Hoff and Genesys Wealth Advisers teammate Nathan Haas dominated Australia's domestic National Road Series. The two riders entered the 2011 Herald Sun Tour, a race featuring numerous UCI ProTeams. Von Hoff progressed from third on stage two to second on stage three; Haas won the general classification.

In January 2012, Von Hoff joined the Chipotle–First Solar Development Team, an American cycling squad, which competes in the UCI Continental Circuits. On 1 August 2012, while competing with the Chipotle–First Solar Development Team, Von Hoff was promoted to stagiaire in UCI ProTeam Garmin–Sharp; he was subsequently reunited with Haas. On 24 August 2012, Von Hoff finished third on the third stage of the Danmark Rundt, a 2.HC event forming part of the UCI Europe Tour.

Von Hoff joined Garmin–Sharp on a full-time basis for the 2013 and 2014 seasons. On 10 January 2014, Von Hoff won the National Criterium Championships. In December 2014 Von Hoff was announced as a member of NFTO's roster for the 2015 season. At the 2015 Tour Down Under, Von Hoff competed as part of the UniSA-Australia team. During the fourth stage of the 2015 Tour Down Under, Von Hoff won the stage. In the autumn of 2015 ONE Pro Cycling announced that Von Hoff would ride for them in 2016.

He won gold at the 2018 Commonwealth Games road race.

== Personal life ==
Born in Mornington, Victoria, Von Hoff currently resides in Moorooduc, Victoria, Australia.

== Major results ==
2011
3rd Road race, Oceania Road Cycling Championships
7th Overall Tour of Wellington
2012
Tour de Guadeloupe

1st Stages 2 & 9

1st Stage 5 Tour du Loir-et-Cher
1st Stage 6 Olympia's Tour
2nd Kattekoers
3rd Criterium, National Road Championships
5th Down Under Classic
6th Overall World Ports Classic
10th Japan Cup
2013
National Road Championships

2nd Criterium
3rd Road race

7th Down Under Classic
2014
1st Criterium, National Road Championships
2015
1st Criterium, National Road Championships
1st Rutland–Melton CiCLE Classic
1st Jock Wadley Memorial Road Race
1st Stage 4 Tour Down Under
3rd London Nocturne
5th Overall Bay Classic Series
2016
1st Stage 1 Tour of Norway
1st Stage 1 Sibiu Cycling Tour
5th Omloop Mandel-Leie-Schelde
8th Grote Prijs Stad Zottegem
9th London–Surrey Classic
10th Rund um Köln
2017
2nd Overall Ronde van Midden-Nederland

1st Stage 1 (TTT)

8th Rutland–Melton International CiCLE Classic
2018
1st Road race, Commonwealth Games
1st Points classification Herald Sun Tour
7th Cadel Evans Great Ocean Road Race
