= Juan José Lobato =

Spanish road cyclist

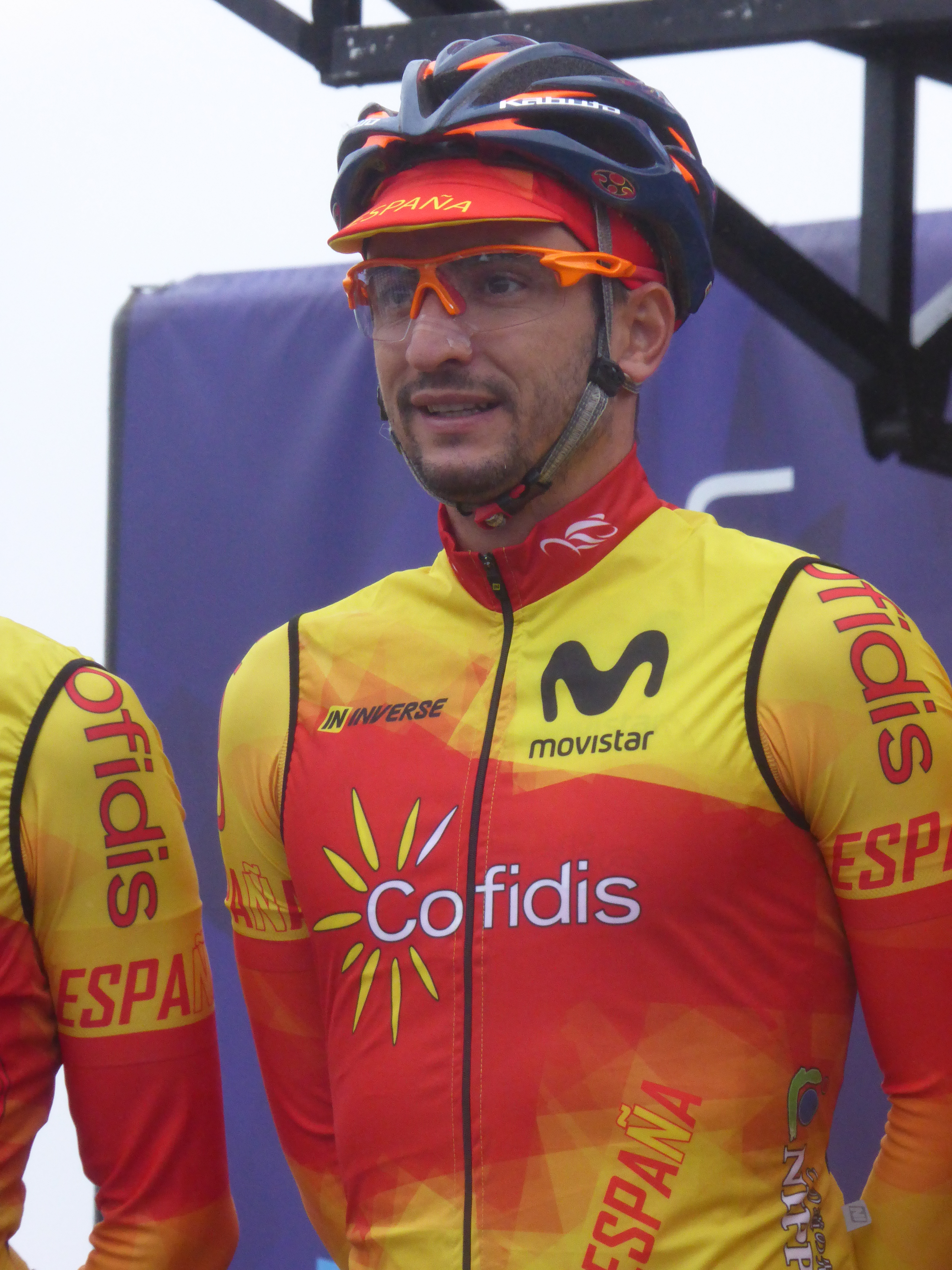
- Lobato at the 2018 European Road Cycling Championships

Personal information
- Full name: Juan José Lobato del Valle
- Nickname: Juanjo
- Born: 30 December 1988 (age 37) Trebujena, Andalusia, Spain
- Height: 1.73 m (5 ft 8 in)
- Weight: 64 kg (141 lb)

Cycling career
- Sport: Cycling
- Current team: Retired
- Discipline: Road
- Role: Rider
- Rider type: Sprinter

Amateur teams
- 2006: Huevar–Aljarafe
- 2007: Würth
- 2008: Cantabria Infinita
- 2009: Cueva El Soplao
- 2010: Andalucía–Cajasur amateur
- 2010: Andalucía–Cajasur (stagiaire)

Professional teams
- 2011–2012: Andalucía–Caja Granada
- 2013: Euskaltel–Euskadi
- 2014–2016: Movistar Team
- 2017: LottoNL–Jumbo
- 2018–2019: Nippo–Vini Fantini–Europa Ovini
- 2020–2023: Fundación–Orbea

Juan José Lobato del Valle (born 30 December 1988) is a Spanish former professional road racing cyclist, who competed as a professional from 2011 to 2023. During his professional career, Lobato took fifteen victories – including two victories at the Circuito de Getxo in 2011 and 2013, a stage win at the 2015 Tour Down Under and the overall victory at the 2016 Vuelta a la Comunidad de Madrid.

== Career ==
Lobato joined the Movistar Team for the 2014 season, after his previous team – Euskaltel–Euskadi – folded at the end of the 2013 season. He then went on to sign a 2-year contract with LottoNL–Jumbo starting 2017. In December 2017, Lobato's contract was terminated, for possession of sleeping pills during a pre-season training camp – violating the team's internal rules.

He joined Nippo–Vini Fantini–Europa Ovini during the 2018 season, remaining until the end of 2019, before joining Fundación–Orbea for the 2020 season.

== Major results ==
2006
1st Road race, National Junior Road Championships
2010
9th Road race, UCI Under-23 Road World Championships
2011
1st Circuito de Getxo
7th Trofeo Mallorca
10th Clásica de Almería
2012
Vuelta Ciclista de Chile

1st Stages 2 & 10

1st Stage 5 Tour of Qinghai Lake
2013
1st Circuito de Getxo
1st Stage 2 Vuelta a Castilla y León
4th Clásica de Almería
6th Vuelta a La Rioja
2014
1st Stage 1 Vuelta a Burgos
2nd Overall Tour de Wallonie

1st Stage 3

2nd Clásica de Almería
4th Gran Premio Nobili Rubinetterie
4th Milan–San Remo
8th Vattenfall Cyclassics
2015
Vuelta a Andalucía

1st Stages 2 & 5

1st Stage 2 Tour Down Under
2nd Down Under Classic
2nd Circuito de Getxo
2nd Clásica de Almería
3rd Overall Dubai Tour
4th Gran Premio Nobili Rubinetterie
2016
1st Overall Vuelta a la Comunidad de Madrid

1st Points classification
1st Stage 1

3rd Overall Dubai Tour

1st Stage 3

3rd Overall Circuit de la Sarthe

1st Stage 4

4th Gran Piemonte
2017
1st Stage 1 Tour de l'Ain
6th Eschborn–Frankfurt – Rund um den Finanzplatz
2018
1st Coppa Sabatini
4th Coppa Bernocchi
4th Gran Premio Bruno Beghelli
5th Brussels Cycling Classic
10th Eschborn–Frankfurt
2019
6th Overall Tour de Korea
10th Overall Tour de Hokkaido

1st Points classification

2020
7th Trofeo Playa de Palma
9th Clásica de Almería
2021
1st Stage 1 Volta ao Alentejo
7th Trofeo Calvià
10th Clàssica Comunitat Valenciana 1969
2022
1st Stage 5 Volta ao Alentejo

=== Grand Tour general classification results timeline ===
Grand Tour	2011	2012	2013	2014	2015	2016	2017	2018	2019	2020	2021
Giro d'Italia	—	—	—	—	DNF	—	—	—	134	—	—
Tour de France	—	—	165	—	—	—	—	—	—	—	—
Vuelta a España	DNF	174	—	—	—	—	112	—	—	—	136
