= Chris Opie =

British cyclist (born 1987)

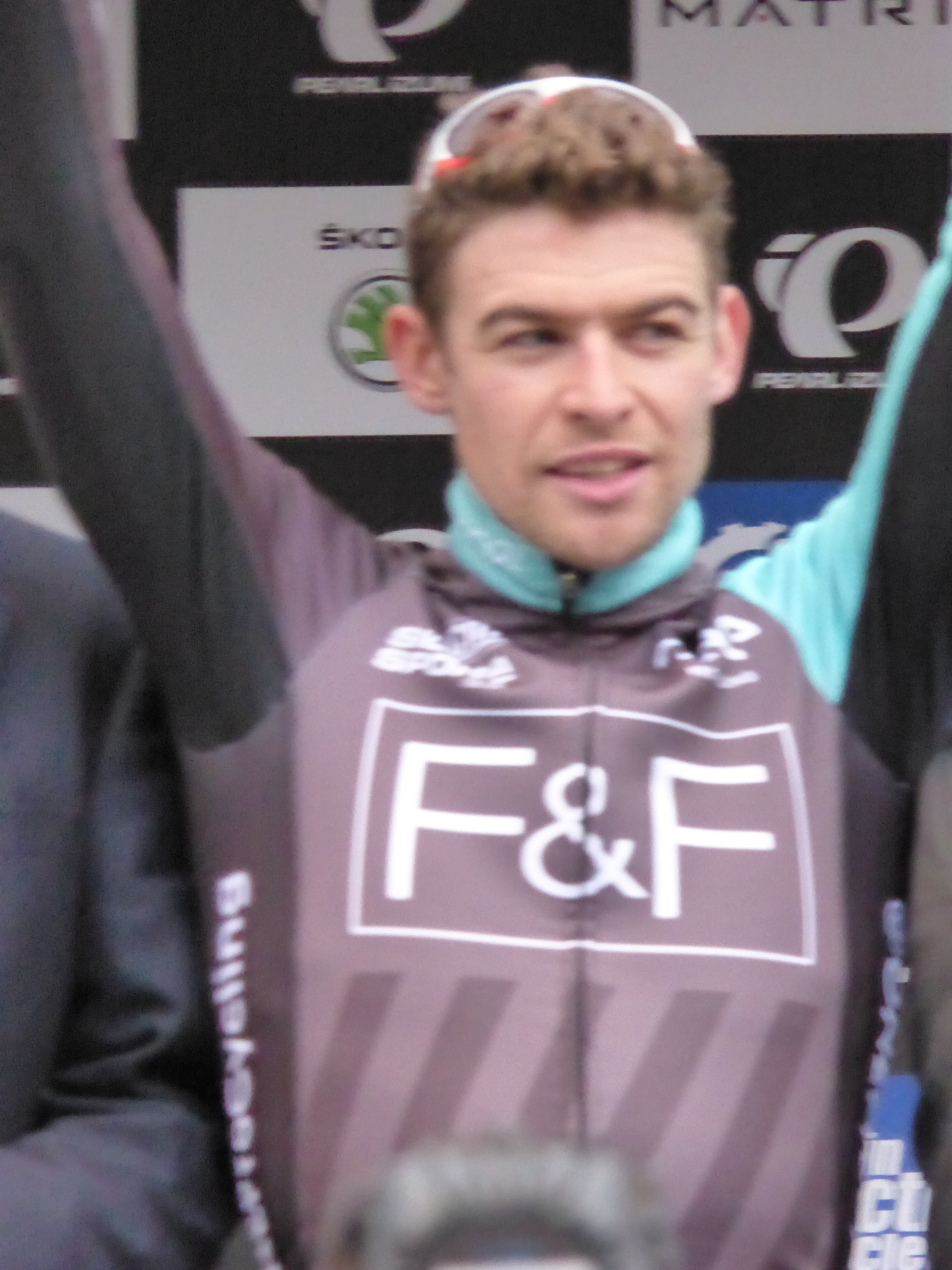
- Opie in 2015

Personal information
- Full name: Christopher Ryan Opie
- Born: 22 July 1987 (age 39) Truro, Cornwall, England
- Height: 1.78 m (5 ft 10 in)
- Weight: 73 kg (161 lb)

Cycling career
- Sport: Cycling
- Current team: Saint Piran
- Discipline: Road
- Role: Rider
- Rider type: Sprinter

Amateur teams
- 1998–2005: www.cyclelogic.co.uk
- 2006: UC Aubenas
- 2007: One and All Cycling
- 2010–2011: Pendragon–Le Col–Colnago
- 2020: Saint Piran

Professional teams
- 2012–2013: Team UK Youth
- 2014: Rapha Condor–JLT
- 2015–2016: ONE Pro Cycling
- 2017–2018: Bike Channel–Canyon
- 2021–: Saint Piran

Christopher Ryan Opie (born 22 July 1987) is a British cyclist and was formerly a presenter at the Global Cycling Network.

== Career ==
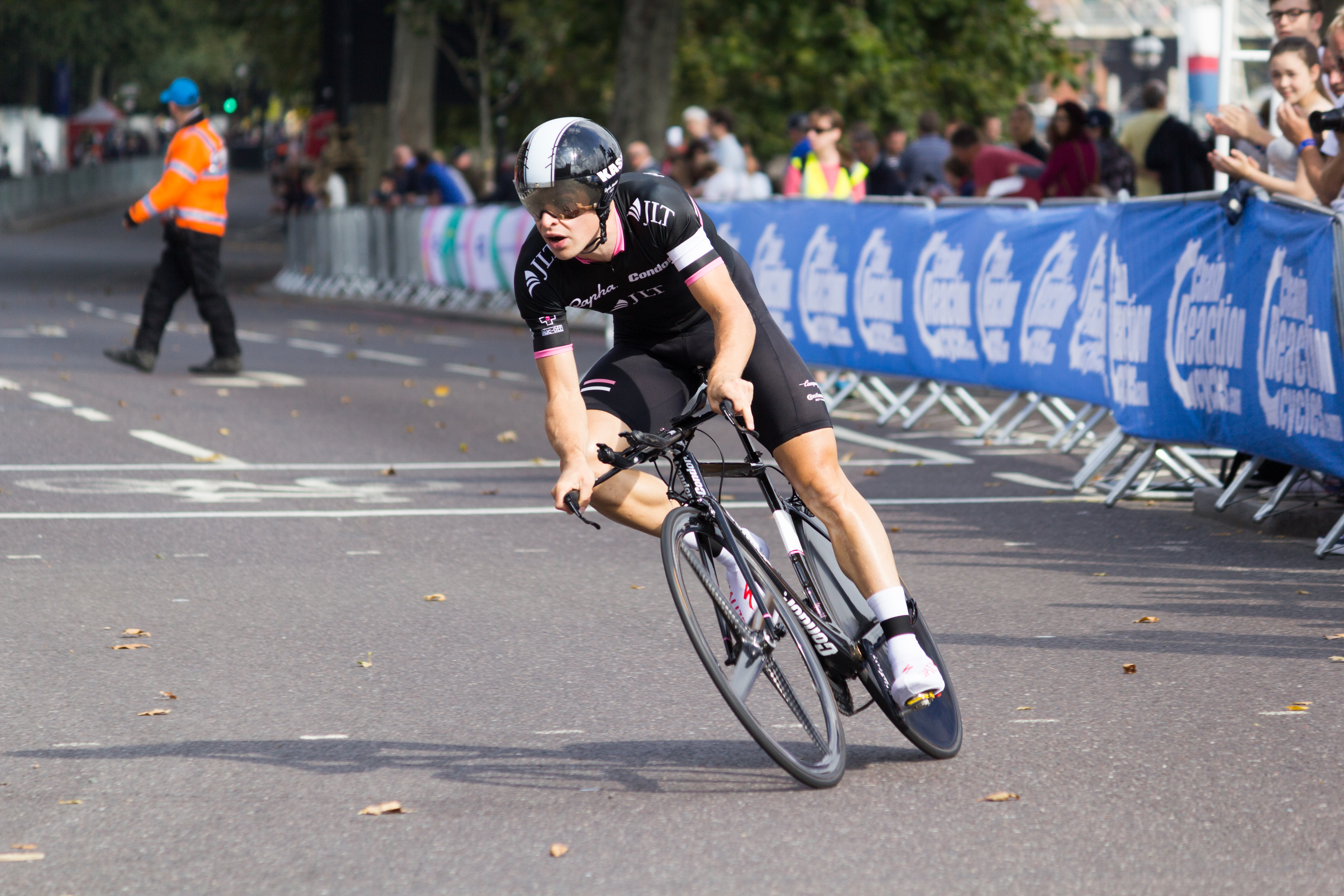
Opie at the 2014 Tour of Britain.

Born in Truro, Cornwall, Opie grew up on a small beef and dairy farm. He attended Kea Primary and Penair Secondary Schools in Truro. He began cycling competitively at the age of 10 and progressed to lead the British National Junior RR Series in 2005.

In 2006, Opie raced in France for UC Aubenas and he battled with a slight eating disorder and, in 2007, with Glandular Fever, but returned to racing in 2008, when he was based in the Netherlands and Belgium. He returned from the Netherlands to ride for Pendragon Sports/Le Col/Colnago in 2010, and when the team wound up at the end of the 2011 season he was signed by Nigel Mansell's Team UK Youth.

After Mansell decided to end his financial support of Team UK Youth, Opie signed for Rapha Condor–JLT for the 2014 season. After one season with the team he was announced as part of the inaugural squad for the ONE Pro Cycling team for the 2015 season. Opie announced his retirement from competition in May 2018 immediately before his final race, the last round of that year's Tour Series in Salisbury. Opie's retirement was a financial decision, following the bankruptcy of one of the team sponsors which led to a halving of riders' salaries.

In January 2019, Opie joined Global Cycling Network as a presenter. However the transition away from racing was not without difficulty and as Opie described himself, led to a minor breakdown suffering from post-traumatic stress disorder (PTSD). Opie decided to make a return to racing in 2020, with the Saint Piran team, despite there being no races held during the period of the COVID-19 pandemic.

== Personal life ==
Opie and his wife Meike have two children together. He is the brother-in-law of Dutch former racing cyclist Remco van der Ven.

== Major results ==
2010
1st GP Al Fatah
Tour of Libya

1st Stages 4 & 5

2012
6th Ster van Zwolle
2013
Tour Series

1st Round 8 – Canary Wharf & Round 10 – Aylsham

2nd Overall Tour of the Reservoir

1st Stage 1

2014
2nd National Circuit Race Championships
2nd Circuit of the Fens
2nd Ipswich and Coastal Grand Prix
3rd Otley Grand Prix
3rd Wales Open Criterium
4th Eddie Soens Memorial
4th Grand Prix des Marbriers
5th Colne Grand Prix
2015
1st Stockton Grand Prix
2nd Perfs Pedal Race
2nd Rutland–Melton International CiCLE Classic
3rd Overall Totnes-Vire Stage Race

1st Stage 2

3rd Chepstow Grand Prix
7th Overall Ronde van Midden-Nederland
2016
1st Overall Ronde van Midden-Nederland

1st Stages 1 (TTT) & 2

1st Stage 2 Tour de Korea
2nd Arnhem–Veenendaal Classic
8th Grand Prix de Denain
2017
7th Ronde van Drenthe
2018
8th PWZ Zuidenveld Tour
