= ONE Pro Cycling =

British cycling team

Team information
- UCI code: ONE
- Registered: United Kingdom
- Founded: 2015
- Disbanded: 2018
- Discipline: Road
- Status: UCI Continental (2015); UCI Professional Continental (2016); UCI Continental (2017–2018)
- Bicycles: Cervélo (2015); Factor Bikes (2016); Boardman Bikes (2017); Storck (2018)
- Website: Team home page

Key personnel
- General manager: Matt Prior
- Team managers: James McCallum; Steve Benton; Rebecca Frewing

Team name history
- 2015–2018: ONE Pro Cycling
ONE Pro Cycling jersey
Jersey

ONE Pro Cycling (UCI team code: ONE) was a British UCI Continental men's cycling team. Their first season was 2015, and they became a Professional Continental team in 2016. Due to funding issues, they reverted to Continental level in 2017.

== History ==
ONE Pro Cycling was owned by retired professional cricketer Matt Prior and businessman Simon Chappell. The team officially launched on 17 February 2015, although started racing the week prior, at the opening race of the UK domestic road race season Prior stated that the team's aim was to join the UCI World Tour within five years. In November 2015 it was confirmed that the team had been granted a UCI Professional Continental licence for the 2016 season. They returned to UCI Continental level for the 2017 season, in part because bike sponsor Factor withdrew their support from the team in favour of supplying bicycles to AG2R La Mondiale. In September 2018 the team announced that they would disband their men's squad at the end of the season in favour of entering the women's peloton the following year. One month later in October 2018 the team announced that they had scrapped plans to launch a women's team for the 2019 season, citing lack of sufficient sponsorship.

== Major wins ==
2015
Perf's Pedal Race, Yanto Barker
Clayton Spring Classic, Peter Williams
Primavera Road Race, Marcin Białobłocki
Severn Bridge Road Race, George Harper
Eddie Soens Memorial Road Race, Peter Williams
Betty Pharoah Memorial Road Race, Marcin Białobłocki
Stage 1 Bałtyk–Karkonosze Tour, Peter Williams
Poland National Time Trial Championships, Marcin Białobłocki
2016
New Zealand National Time Trial Championships, Hayden McCormick
Stage 3 New Zealand Cycle Classic, Kristian House
The REV Classic, Dion Smith
Tro-Bro Léon, Martin Mortensen
Stage 1 Tour of Norway, Steele Von Hoff
Stage 2 Tour de Korea, Chris Opie
Stages 3 & 5 Tour de Korea, Karol Domagalski
Stage 7 Tour de Korea, Kristian House
Beaumont Trophy, Dion Smith
Stage 1 Sibiu Cycling Tour, Steele Von Hoff
2017
Stage 5 Szlakiem Walk Majora Hubala, Tom Stewart
Beaumont Trophy, Peter Williams
Stage 2 Kreiz Breizh Elites, James Oram
Grand Prix des Marbriers, Karol Domagalski
Overall Ronde van Midden-Nederland, Kamil Gradek

Stage 1, Team time trial

2018
Overall New Zealand Cycle Classic, Hayden McCormick
Poreč Trophy, Emīls Liepiņš
Stage 3 Istrian Spring Trophy, Emīls Liepiņš
Heistse Pijl, Emīls Liepiņš

== National champions ==
2015
Poland National Time Trial, Marcin Bialoblocki
2016
New Zealand National Time Trial, Hayden Mccormick

== Team roster ==
Rider	Date of birth
Tom Baylis (GBR)	3 January 1996 (age 30)
Karol Domagalski (POL)	9 August 1989 (age 37)
Jake Kelly (GBR)	17 January 1995 (age 31)
Christopher Latham (GBR)	6 February 1994 (age 32)
Emils Liepins (LAT)	29 October 1992 (age 34)

Rider	Date of birth
Hayden McCormick (NZL)	1 January 1994 (age 32)
James Oram (NZL)	17 June 1993 (age 33)
Jacob Scott (GBR)	14 June 1995 (age 31)
Szymon Tracz (POL)	16 October 1998 (age 28)
Peter Williams (GBR)	13 December 1986 (age 39)
