= Ronde van Midden-Nederland =

Dutch one-day road cycling race

Race details
- Date: August
- Region: Netherlands
- English name: Tour of the Central Netherlands
- Local name: Ronde van Midden-Nederland
- Discipline: Road race
- Competition: UCI Europe Tour
- Type: Stage race
- Web site: rondevanmiddennederland.nl

History
- First edition: 1948
- Editions: 60 (as of 2017)
- First winner: Gerrit Voorting (NED)
- Most wins: Wim Stroetinga (NED) (3 wins)
- Most recent: Kamil Gradek (POL)

The Ronde van Midden-Nederland is a road bicycle race held annually in Netherlands. It was organized as a 1.2 event on the UCI Europe Tour from 2005 to 2013, and as a 2.2 since 2015.

== Winners ==
Year	Country	Rider	Team
1948	Netherlands	Gerrit Voorting	
1949	Belgium	Lode Wouters	
1950	Netherlands	Hein van Breenen	
1951	Netherlands	Hein van Breenen	
1952	Netherlands	Adrie Voorting	
1953	Belgium	Rik Van Looy	Gitane–Hutchinson
1954	Netherlands	Krijn Post	
1955	Netherlands	Piet Steenvoorden	
1956	Netherlands	Piet de Jongh	
1957	Netherlands	Gijs Pauw	
1958	Netherlands	René Lotz	
1959	No race		
1960	Netherlands	Jan Janssen	
1961	Netherlands	Henk Nijdam	
1962– 1965	No race		
1966	Netherlands	Leen de Groot	
1967	No race		
1968	Netherlands	Daan Holst	
1969	Netherlands	Henk Benjamins	Netherlands national team
1970	Netherlands	Ger Harings	Caballero–Laurens
1971	Netherlands	Jan Hordijk	
1972	Netherlands	Aad van den Hoek	
1973	Netherlands	Jan Raas	
1974	Netherlands	Jan van Houwelingen	
1975	Netherlands	Michel Jacobs	
1976	Netherlands	Hans Koot	
1977	Netherlands	Piet van Leeuwen	
1978	Netherlands	Frits Pirard	Miko-Mercier-Hutchinson
1979	Netherlands	Jos Lammertink	
1980	Netherlands	Jacques Hanegraaf	
1981	Netherlands	Piet Kuys	
1982	Netherlands	Joop Ribbers	
1983	Netherlands	Jack van der Toorn	
1984	Netherlands	Nico van de Klundert	
1985	Netherlands	Piet Pompstra	
1986	Netherlands	John van den Akker	
1987	Netherlands	Johnny Broers	
1988	Netherlands	Louis de Koning	Panasonic-Isostar-Colnago-Agu
1989	Netherlands	Mario Gutte	
1990	Netherlands	Rober van de Vin	
1991	Netherlands	Godert de Leeuw	
1992	Netherlands	Jan de Leeuw	
1993	Netherlands	Godert de Leeuw	
1994	Lithuania	Jonas Romanovas	
1995	No race		
1996	Netherlands	Robert van der Donk	
1997	Netherlands	Erik Bos	
1998	No race due to storm		
1999	Netherlands	Peter Voshol	
2000	Netherlands	Albert Schurer	
2001	No race due to storm		
2002	Netherlands	Sander Lormans	
2003	Netherlands	Marvin van der Pluijm	Apac–Eemland Cycling Team
2004	Netherlands	Angelo van Melis	Van Vliet–EBH Advocaten
2005	Netherlands	Wim Stroetinga	Team Löwik Meubelen–Van Losser
2006	Netherlands	Niki Terpstra	Ubbink-Syntec
2007	Netherlands	Marco Bos	Cycling Team Jo Piels
2008	Netherlands	Jan Bos	Cycling Team Jo Piels
2009	Netherlands	Jeroen Boelen	Van Hemert Groep-DJR
2010	Netherlands	Wesley Kreder	Rabobank Continental Team
2011	Netherlands	Wim Stroetinga	Ubbink–Koga
2012	Netherlands	Ivar Slik	Rabobank Continental Team
2013	Germany	Sebastian Forke	Team NSP–Ghost
2014	Netherlands	Wim Stroetinga	Koga Cycling Team
2015	Belgium	Olivier Pardini	Verandas Willems
2016	Great Britain	Chris Opie	ONE Pro Cycling
2017	Poland	Kamil Gradek	ONE Pro Cycling
2018	Denmark	Casper von Folsach	Team ColoQuick
