= 2020 Lotto–Soudal season =

Lotto-Soudal
- 2020 season
- UCI code: LTS
- Status: UCI WorldTeam
- Manager: Marc Sergeant
- Main sponsor(s): Soudal
- Based: Belgium
- Bicycles: Ridley
- Groupset: Campagnolo

Season victories
- One-day races: 1
- Stage race stages: 11
- Most wins: Caleb Ewan (8)
- Best ranked rider: Caleb Ewan
- Jersey

The 2020 season for the Lotto–Soudal cycling team began in January at the Tour Down Under.

== Team roster ==
As of 1 January 2020.

Rider	Date of birth
Sander Armée (BEL)	10 December 1985 (aged 34)
Steff Cras (BEL)	13 February 1996 (aged 23)
Jasper De Buyst (BEL)	24 November 1993 (aged 26)
Thomas De Gendt (BEL)	6 November 1986 (aged 33)
John Degenkolb (GER)	7 January 1989 (aged 30)
Stan Dewulf (BEL)	20 December 1997 (aged 22)
Jonathan Dibben (GBR)	12 February 1994 (aged 25)
Caleb Ewan (AUS)	11 July 1994 (aged 25)
Frederik Frison (BEL)	28 July 1992 (aged 27)
Philippe Gilbert (BEL)	5 July 1982 (aged 37)
Kobe Goossens (BEL)	29 April 1996 (aged 23)
Carl Fredrik Hagen (NOR)	26 September 1991 (aged 28)
Adam Hansen (AUS)	11 May 1981 (aged 38)
Matthew Holmes (GBR)	8 December 1993 (aged 26)

Rider	Date of birth
Rasmus Byriel Iversen (DEN)	16 September 1997 (aged 22)
Roger Kluge (GER)	5 February 1986 (aged 33)
Nikolas Maes (BEL)	9 April 1986 (aged 33)
Tomasz Marczyński (POL)	6 March 1984 (aged 35)
Rémy Mertz (BEL)	17 July 1995 (aged 24)
Stefano Oldani (ITA)	10 January 1998 (aged 21)
Gerben Thijssen (BEL)	21 June 1998 (aged 21)
Tosh Van der Sande (BEL)	28 November 1990 (aged 29)
Brian van Goethem (NED)	16 April 1991 (aged 28)
Brent Van Moer (BEL)	12 January 1998 (aged 21)
Harm Vanhoucke (BEL)	17 June 1997 (aged 22)
Florian Vermeersch (BEL)	12 April 1999 (aged 20)
Jelle Wallays (BEL)	11 May 1989 (aged 30)
Tim Wellens (BEL)	10 May 1991 (aged 28)

Riders who joined the team for the 2020 season

Rider	2019 team
Steff Cras	Team Katusha–Alpecin
John Degenkolb	Trek–Segafredo
Jonathan Dibben	Madison Genesis
Philippe Gilbert	Deceuninck–Quick-Step
Kobe Goossens	neo-pro (Lotto–Soudal U23)
Matthew Holmes	Madison Genesis
Stefano Oldani	neo-pro (Kometa Cycling Team)
Gerben Thijssen	neo-pro (Lotto–Soudal U23)
Brent Van Moer	neo-pro (Lotto–Soudal U23)
Florian Vermeersch	neo-pro (Lotto–Soudal U23)

Riders who left the team during or after the 2019 season

Rider	2020 team
Tiesj Benoot	Team Sunweb
Adam Blythe	Retired
Victor Campenaerts	NTT Pro Cycling
Jens Keukeleire	EF Pro Cycling
Bjorg Lambrecht	Deceased
Maxime Monfort	Retired
Lawrence Naesen	AG2R La Mondiale
Jelle Vanendert	Bingoal–Wallonie Bruxelles
Enzo Wouters	Tarteletto–Isorex

== Season victories ==
Date	Race	Competition	Rider	Country	Location
21 January	Tour Down Under, Stage 2	UCI World Tour	Caleb Ewan (AUS)	Australia	Stirling
23 January	Tour Down Under, Stage 4	UCI World Tour	Caleb Ewan (AUS)	Australia	Murray Bridge
25 January	Tour Down Under, Stage 6	UCI World Tour	Matthew Holmes (GBR)	Australia	Willunga Hill
24 February	UAE Tour, Stage 2	UCI World Tour	Caleb Ewan (AUS)	United Arab Emirates	Hatta Dam
27 February	UAE Tour, Points classification	UCI World Tour	Caleb Ewan (AUS)	United Arab Emirates	
16 August	Tour de Wallonie, Stage 1	UCI Europe Tour; UCI ProSeries	Caleb Ewan (AUS)	Belgium	Templeuve
29 August	Tour Poitou-Charentes en Nouvelle-Aquitaine, Stage 3a	UCI Europe Tour	Sander Armée (BEL)	France	Jaunay-Marigny
30 August	Tour Poitou-Charentes en Nouvelle-Aquitaine, Mountains classification	UCI Europe Tour	Harm Vanhoucke (BEL)	France	
31 August	Tour de France, Stage 3	UCI World Tour	Caleb Ewan (AUS)	France	Sisteron
9 September	Tour de France, Stage 11	UCI World Tour	Caleb Ewan (AUS)	France	Poitiers
17 September	Tour de Luxembourg, Stage 3	UCI Europe Tour; UCI ProSeries	John Degenkolb (GER)	Luxembourg	Schifflange
14 October	Scheldeprijs	UCI Europe Tour; UCI ProSeries	Caleb Ewan (AUS)	Belgium	Schoten
24 October	Vuelta a España, Stage 5	UCI World Tour	Tim Wellens (BEL)	Spain	Sabiñánigo
4 November	Vuelta a España, Stage 14	UCI World Tour	Tim Wellens (BEL)	Spain	Ourense

== National, Continental and World champions ==
Date	Discipline	Jersey	Rider	Country	Location
