= 2019 Tour de Yorkshire =

5th men's Tour de Yorkshire

2019 UCI Europe Tour
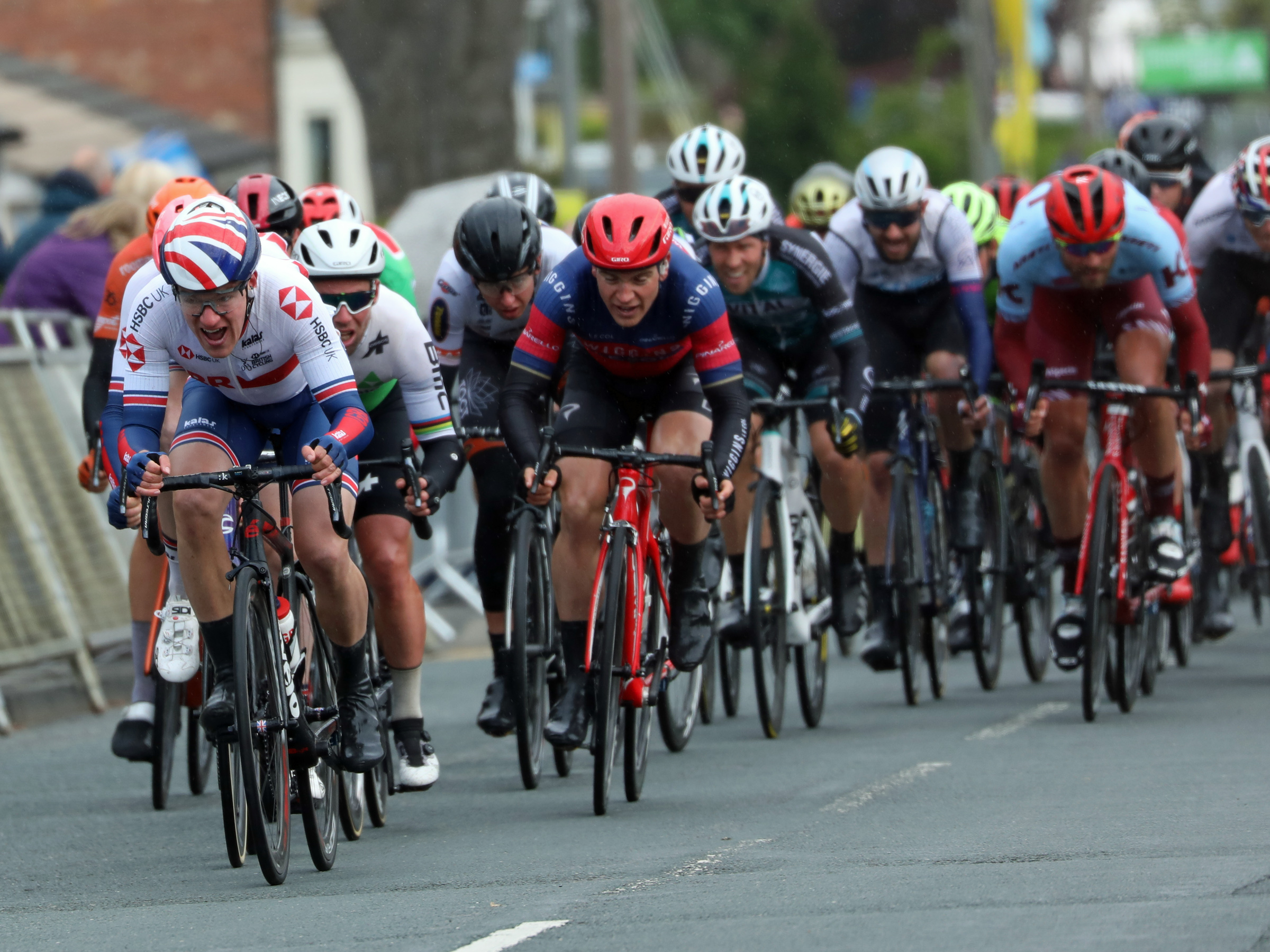
- The sprint to the finish line at Bedale (stage 2)

Race details
- Dates: 2–5 May 2019
- Stages: 4
- Distance: 638 km (396 mi)

Results
Jersey awarded to the overall winner	Winner	Chris Lawless (GBR)	(Team INEOS)
	Second	Greg Van Avermaet (BEL)	(CCC Team)
	Third	Eddie Dunbar (IRL)	(Team INEOS)
Jersey awarded to the points classification winner	Points	Chris Lawless (GBR)	(Team INEOS)
Jersey awarded to the mountains classification winner	Mountains	Arnaud Courteille (FRA)	(Vital Concept–B&B Hotels)
	Team	Team INEOS	

The 2019 Tour de Yorkshire was a four-day cycling stage race held in Yorkshire over 2–5 May 2019. It was the fifth edition of the Tour de Yorkshire, organised by Welcome to Yorkshire and the Amaury Sport Organisation. The race was rated as a 2.HC event as part of the UCI Europe Tour.

The race started in Doncaster on 2 May and finished in Leeds on 5 May. It was broadcast on ITV. This was the last race to be held prior to its cancellation in March 2020 due to the COVID-19 pandemic.

== Route ==
In December 2018, the stages were announced, coupled with names, and the final stage of Halifax to Leeds being named The Yorkshire Classic. The Halifax to Leeds race was also the final stage in the 2018 Tour de Yorkshire and at the launch event, Sir Gary Verity revealed that this stage would be repeated as the final stage in each future iteration of the TdY, with a minor tweak or two.

Stage characteristics
Stage	Date	Start	Finish	Length	Name	Type	Winner
1	2 May	Doncaster	Selby	189 km (117.4 miles)	The Heritage Stage	Flat stage	Jesper Asselman (NED)
2	3 May	Barnsley	Bedale	132 km (82 miles)	The World Stage	Hilly stage	Rick Zabel (GER)
3	4 May	Bridlington	Scarborough	135 km (84 miles)	The Yorkshire Coast	Hilly stage	Alexander Kamp (DEN)
4	5 May	Halifax	Leeds	182 km (113.1 miles)	The Yorkshire Classic	Hilly stage	Greg Van Avermaet (BEL)

This will result in a course totalling 638 kilometres (396 mi) over four days. The course will also see the riders climb a cumulative 3,200 metres (10,500 ft) over the four days, and for the first time, the women's race will be run on the Friday and Saturday (the 3 and 4 of May) using exactly the same routes as the men's race (stages 2 and 3).

== Teams ==
Nineteen teams were announced as partaking in the event. These were:

UCI WorldTeams

- CCC Team
- Team Katusha–Alpecin
- Team Dimension Data
- Team INEOS

UCI Professional Continental teams

- Cofidis
- Euskadi–Murias
- Hagens Berman Axeon
- Rally UHC Cycling
- Riwal Readynez
- Roompot–Charles
- Vital Concept–B&B Hotels
- Total Direct Énergie

UCI Continental teams

- Canyon dhb p/b Bloor Homes
- Madison Genesis
- Team Wiggins Le Col
- Ribble Pro Cycling
- Swift Carbon Pro Cycling
- Vitus Pro Cycling Team

National teams

- Great Britain

In May 2019, Team Sky was renamed Team Ineos to reflect the change of sponsorship. This led to several representatives of Doncaster Council stating that they will boycott the TdY when it goes through Doncaster as a protest at Ineos and its fracking programme which has a drilling site at Misson, just outside the Doncaster Council area. Councillor Dave Shaw accused the team of "rank hypocrisy" after riding with messages highlighting ocean pollution and that they were now accepting money "from one of the largest sources of that pollution."

An Ineos spokesperson refuted that and stated that "Ineos operate to the highest safety and environmental standards." Despite this, many protestors were present at the start of the stages. Friends of the Earth posted an open letter to David Brailsford, the team principal at Team Ineos, accusing Ineos of using the sport as a greenwashing exercise. Brailsford said that the protestors were perfectly entitled to their opinion but also noted that the numbers at stage one were far less than the 15,000 that the anti-fracking community had anticipated. One of Team Ineos' riders, Chris Froome also mentioned that other cycling teams had sponsors from the petrochemical industry. Froome said at the team launch on 1 May 2019;

If you're going to ask so much from certain sports people and not others, especially when there are other energy companies within the peloton and not a word was said to those riders, then I don't think it is fair.

Stephen Park, performance director at British Cycling, also weighed in to the controversy, stating his thoughts on the team takeover;

One option would obviously have been to wrap up the team altogether; so maintaining a pro-level team in the UK with a UK owner and hopefully retaining a national basis of Great Britain in terms of riders they support, providing opportunity and inspiration and a home team to get behind, well that seems the best option.

Protesters at Bridlington stated that Ineos were "disgusting" for using the event to promote their brand. One of those protesting said

We are very much in favour of cycling and the Tour de Yorkshire, but are against Ineos and its brainwashing. The company wants to frack, and I think it's disgusting they are using the Tour de Yorkshire and cycling to promote its brand.

== Stages ==
=== Stage 1 ===
2 May 2019 — Doncaster to Selby, 189 km (117.4 miles)

Result of Stage 1
Rank	Rider	Team	Time
1	Jesper Asselman (NED)	Roompot–Charles	4h 05' 45"
2	Filippo Fortin (ITA)	Cofidis	+ 0"
3	Jonas Van Genechten (BEL)	Vital Concept–B&B Hotels	+ 0"
4	Boy van Poppel (NED)	Roompot–Charles	+ 0"
5	Gabriel Cullaigh (GBR)	Team Wiggins Le Col	+ 0"
6	Ethan Hayter (GBR)	Great Britain	+ 0"
7	Cyril Barthe (FRA)	Euskadi–Murias	+ 0"
8	Mark Cavendish (GBR)	Team Dimension Data	+ 0"
9	Chris Lawless (GBR)	Team INEOS	+ 0"
10	Rick Zabel (GER)	Team Katusha–Alpecin	+ 0"

General classification after Stage 1
Rank	Rider	Team	Time
1	Jesper Asselman (NED)	Roompot–Charles	4h 05' 45"
2	Filippo Fortin (ITA)	Cofidis	+ 5"
3	Jacob Hennessy (GBR)	Canyon dhb p/b Bloor Homes	+ 5"
4	Jonas Van Genechten (BEL)	Vital Concept–B&B Hotels	+ 7"
5	Kevin Vermaerke (USA)	Hagens Berman Axeon	+ 7"
6	Daniel Bigham (GBR)	Ribble Pro Cycling	+ 10"
7	Boy van Poppel (NED)	Roompot–Charles	+ 11"
8	Gabriel Cullaigh (GBR)	Team Wiggins Le Col	+ 11"
9	Ethan Hayter (GBR)	Great Britain	+ 11"
10	Cyril Barthe (FRA)	Euskadi–Murias	+ 11"

=== Stage 2 ===
3 May 2019 — Barnsley to Bedale, 132 km (82.0 miles)

Result of Stage 2
Rank	Rider	Team	Time
1	Rick Zabel (GER)	Team Katusha–Alpecin	3h 09' 16"
2	Boy van Poppel (NED)	Roompot–Charles	+ 0"
3	Chris Lawless (GBR)	Team INEOS	+ 0"
4	Andrew Tennant (GBR)	Canyon dhb p/b Bloor Homes	+ 0"
5	Daniel McLay (GBR)	Great Britain	+ 0"
6	Andreas Stokbro (DEN)	Riwal Readynez	+ 0"
7	Jonas Van Genechten (BEL)	Vital Concept–B&B Hotels	+ 0"
8	Michael Rice (AUS)	Hagens Berman Axeon	+ 0"
9	Cyril Barthe (FRA)	Euskadi–Murias	+ 0"
10	Connor Swift (GBR)	Madison Genesis	+ 0"

General classification after Stage 2
Rank	Rider	Team	Time
1	Jesper Asselman (NED)	Roompot–Charles	7h 14' 50"
2	Rick Zabel (GER)	Team Katusha–Alpecin	+ 1"
3	Boy van Poppel (NED)	Roompot–Charles	+ 5"
4	Filippo Fortin (ITA)	Cofidis	+ 5"
5	Jacob Hennessy (GBR)	Canyon dhb p/b Bloor Homes	+ 5"
6	Jonas Van Genechten (BEL)	Vital Concept–B&B Hotels	+ 7"
7	Chris Lawless (GBR)	Team INEOS	+ 7"
8	Kevin Vermaerke (USA)	Hagens Berman Axeon	+ 7"
9	Thomas Stewart (GBR)	Canyon dhb p/b Bloor Homes	+ 7"
10	Cyril Barthe (FRA)	Euskadi–Murias	+ 11"

=== Stage 3 ===
4 May 2019 — Bridlington to Scarborough, 135 km (83.9 miles)

Result of Stage 3
Rank	Rider	Team	Time
1	Alexander Kamp (DEN)	Riwal Readynez	3h 23' 24"
2	Chris Lawless (GBR)	Team INEOS	+ 0"
3	Greg Van Avermaet (BEL)	CCC Team	+ 0"
4	Rasmus Tiller (NOR)	Team Dimension Data	+ 0"
5	Scott Thwaites (GBR)	Vitus Pro Cycling Team	+ 0"
6	Owain Doull (GBR)	Team INEOS	+ 0"
7	Matthew Holmes (GBR)	Madison Genesis	+ 0"
8	Andreas Stokbro (DEN)	Riwal Readynez	+ 0"
9	Nick van der Lijke (NED)	Roompot–Charles	+ 0"
10	Jenthe Biermans (BEL)	Team Katusha–Alpecin	+ 0"

General classification after Stage 3
Rank	Rider	Team	Time
1	Chris Lawless (GBR)	Team INEOS	10h 38' 15"
2	Alexander Kamp (DEN)	Riwal Readynez	+ 0"
3	Greg Van Avermaet (BEL)	CCC Team	+ 6"
4	Andreas Stokbro (DEN)	Riwal Readynez	+ 10"
5	Scott Thwaites (GBR)	Vitus Pro Cycling Team	+ 10"
6	Nick van der Lijke (NED)	Roompot–Charles	+ 10"
7	Owain Doull (GBR)	Team INEOS	+ 10"
8	Eddie Dunbar (IRL)	Team INEOS	+ 10"
9	Jenthe Biermans (BEL)	Team Katusha–Alpecin	+ 10"
10	James Shaw (GBR)	Swift Carbon Pro Cycling	+ 10"

=== Stage 4 ===
5 May 2019 — Halifax to Leeds, 182 km (113.1 miles)

Result of Stage 4
Rank	Rider	Team	Time
1	Greg Van Avermaet (BEL)	CCC Team	4h 40' 03"
2	Chris Lawless (GBR)	Team INEOS	+ 0"
3	Eddie Dunbar (IRL)	Team INEOS	+ 2"
4	Tom-Jelte Slagter (NED)	Team Dimension Data	+ 9"
5	James Shaw (GBR)	Swift Carbon Pro Cycling	+ 9"
6	Matthew Holmes (GBR)	Madison Genesis	+ 9"
7	Alexander Kamp (DEN)	Riwal Readynez	+ 9"
8	Gabriel Cullaigh (GBR)	Team Wiggins Le Col	+ 9"
9	Jenthe Biermans (BEL)	Team Katusha–Alpecin	+ 9"
10	Scott Thwaites (GBR)	Vitus Pro Cycling Team	+ 9"

Final general classification
Rank	Rider	Team	Time
1	Chris Lawless (GBR)	Team INEOS	15h 18' 12"
2	Greg Van Avermaet (BEL)	CCC Team	+ 2"
3	Eddie Dunbar (IRL)	Team INEOS	+ 11"
4	Alexander Kamp (DEN)	Riwal Readynez	+ 15"
5	James Shaw (GBR)	Swift Carbon Pro Cycling	+ 25"
6	Matthew Holmes (GBR)	Madison Genesis	+ 25"
7	Tom-Jelte Slagter (NED)	Team Dimension Data	+ 25"
8	Scott Thwaites (GBR)	Vitus Pro Cycling Team	+ 28"
9	Connor Swift (GBR)	Madison Genesis	+ 28"
10	Nick van der Lijke (NED)	Roompot–Charles	+ 28"

== Classification leadership table ==
In the Tour de Yorkshire, four different jerseys were awarded. The general classification was calculated by adding each cyclist's finishing times on each stage. Time bonuses were awarded to the first three finishers on all stages: the stage winner won a ten-second bonus, with six and four seconds for the second and third riders respectively. Bonus seconds were also awarded to the first three riders at intermediate sprints; three seconds for the winner of the sprint, two seconds for the rider in second and one second for the rider in third. The leader of the general classification received a light blue and yellow jersey. This classification was considered the most important of the Tour de Yorkshire, and the winner of the classification was considered the winner of the race.

Points for the points classification
Position	1	2	3	4	5	6	7	8	9	10
Points awarded	15	12	9	7	6	5	4	3	2	1

The second classification was the points classification. Riders were awarded points for finishing in the top ten in a stage. Unlike in the points classification in the Tour de France, the winners of all stages were awarded the same number of points. Points were also won in intermediate sprints; five points for crossing the sprint line first, three points for second place and one for third. The leader of the points classification was awarded a green jersey.

Points for the mountains classification
Position	1	2	3
Points awarded	4	2	1

There was also a mountains classification, for which points were awarded for reaching the top of a climb before other riders. Each climb was categorised the same, with four points awarded to the first rider over the top of each climb. Two points were awarded for the second-placed rider, with one point for third place. The leadership of the mountains classification was marked by a pink jersey.

Another jersey was awarded at the end of each stage. This was a combativity prize and was awarded to the rider who "made the greatest effort and [...] demonstrated the best qualities in terms of sportsmanship". A jury selected a list of riders to be eligible for the prize; the winner of the prize was then decided by a vote on Twitter. The rider was awarded a grey jersey. There was also a classification for teams, in which the times of the best three cyclists in a team on each stage were added together; the leading team at the end of the race was the team with the lowest cumulative time.

Stage	Winner	General classification	Points classification	Mountains classification	Combativity prize	Teams classification
1	Jesper Asselman	Jesper Asselman	Jesper Asselman	Jacob Hennessy	Daniel Bigham	Roompot–Charles
2	Rick Zabel	Jesper Asselman	Boy van Poppel	Jacob Hennessy	Jake Scott	Great Britain
3	Alexander Kamp	Chris Lawless	Chris Lawless	Robert Scott	John Archibald	Team INEOS
4	Greg Van Avermaet	Chris Lawless	Chris Lawless	Arnaud Courteille	Lucas Eriksson	Team INEOS
Final		Chris Lawless	Chris Lawless	Arnaud Courteille	Not Awarded	Team INEOS
