= 2018 Tour de Yorkshire =

4th men's Tour de Yorkshire

2018 UCI Europe Tour
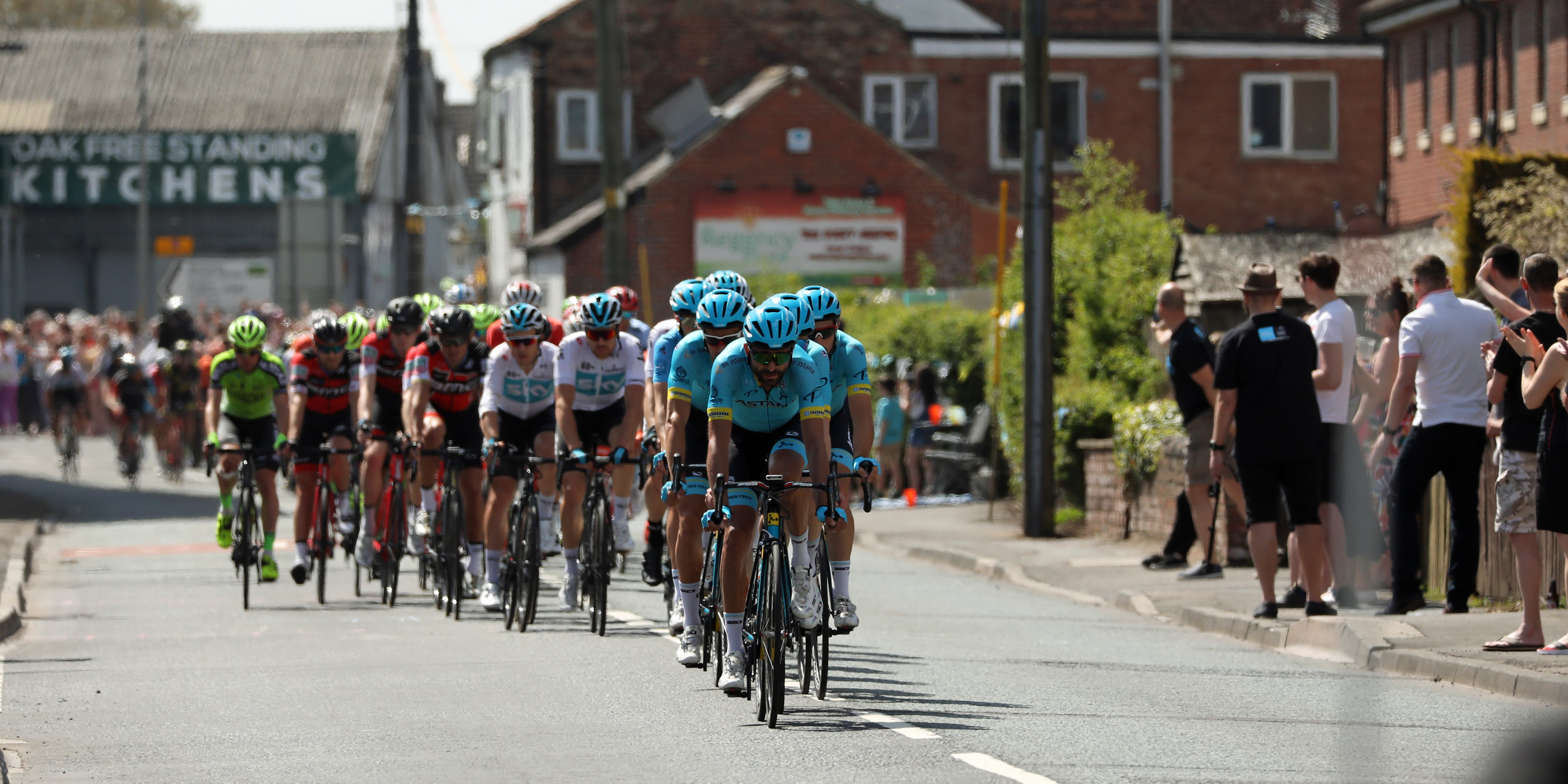
- The Peloton on stage 3 through Leeming Bar

Race details
- Dates: 3–6 May 2018
- Stages: 4
- Distance: 705 km (438.1 mi)
- Winning time: 16h 38' 00"

Results
Jersey awarded to the overall winner	Winner	Greg Van Avermaet (BEL)	(BMC Racing Team)
	Second	Eduard Prades (ESP)	(Euskadi Basque Country–Murias)
	Third	Serge Pauwels (BEL)	(Team Dimension Data)
Jersey awarded to the points classification winner	Points	Greg Van Avermaet (BEL)	(BMC Racing Team)
Jersey awarded to the mountains classification winner	Mountains	Stéphane Rossetto (FRA)	(Cofidis)
	Team	BMC Racing Team	

The 2018 Tour de Yorkshire was a four-day cycling stage race held in Yorkshire over 3–6 May 2018. It was the fourth edition of the Tour de Yorkshire, organised by Welcome to Yorkshire and the Amaury Sport Organisation. The 2018 TDY differed from its predecessor in that the event was extended to four days from three, with the women's event being extended to two days over the 3 and 4 May 2018.

== Route ==
The Tour was extended in September 2017 to allow for greater creativity in the route planning. Additionally, the British Cycling chief executive Julie Harrington said: "[This] will give even more people a chance to see our great sport at close quarters."

In December 2017, the start and finish locations were announced as Beverley and Doncaster, Barnsley and Ilkley, Richmond and Scarborough, and Halifax and Leeds.

Stage characteristics and winners
Stage	Date	Start	Finish	Length	Type	Winner
1	3 May	Beverley	Doncaster	182 km (113.1 miles)	Flat stage	Harry Tanfield (GBR)
2	4 May	Barnsley	Ilkley	149 km (92.6 miles)	Hilly stage	Magnus Cort Nielsen (DEN)
3	5 May	Richmond	Scarborough	184 km (114.3 miles)	Hilly stage	Max Walscheid (GER)
4	6 May	Halifax	Leeds	189.5 km (117.7 miles)	Hilly stage	Stéphane Rossetto (FRA)

== Teams ==
Twenty teams were announced as partaking in the event. These were:

- Aqua Blue Sport (Ireland)
- Astana Pro Team (Kazakhstan)
- BMC Racing Team (United States)
- Canyon Eisberg (Great Britain)
- Cofidis, Solutions Credits (France)
- Team Dimension Data (South Africa)
- Direct Énergie (France)
- Euskadi Basque Country–Murias (Spain)
- Great Britain Cycling Team (Great Britain)
- Holdsworth Pro Racing (Great Britain)
- JLT-Condor (Great Britain)
- Madison Genesis (Great Britain)
- ONE Pro Cycling (Great Britain)
- Rally Cycling (United States)
- Roompot – Nederlandse Loterij (Netherlands)
- Team Katusha–Alpecin (Switzerland)
- Team Sky (Great Britain)
- Team Sunweb (Germany)
- Vital Concept (France)
- Vitus Pro Cycling (Great Britain)

== Stages ==
=== Stage 1 ===
3 May 2018 — Beverley to Doncaster, 182 km (113.1 miles)

Stage 1 result

Rank	Rider	Team	Time
1	Harry Tanfield (GBR)	Canyon Eisberg	4h 08' 12"
2	Alistair Slater (GBR)	JLT–Condor	+ 0"
3	Michael Cuming (GBR)	Madison Genesis	+ 0"
4	Emerson Oronte (USA)	Rally Cycling	+ 0"
5	Tom Baylis (GBR)	ONE Pro Cycling	+ 0"
6	Max Walscheid (GER)	Team Sunweb	+ 5"
7	Bryan Coquard (FRA)	Vital Concept	+ 5"
8	Emīls Liepiņš (LAT)	ONE Pro Cycling	+ 5"
9	Colin Joyce (USA)	Rally Cycling	+ 5"
10	Riccardo Minali (ITA)	Astana	+ 5"

General classification after stage 1

Rank	Rider	Team	Time
1	Harry Tanfield (GBR)	Canyon Eisberg	4h 07' 58"
2	Alistair Slater (GBR)	JLT–Condor	+ 3"
3	Michael Cuming (GBR)	Madison Genesis	+ 10"
4	Emerson Oronte (USA)	Rally Cycling	+ 14"
5	Tom Baylis (GBR)	ONE Pro Cycling	+ 14"
6	Axel Journiaux (FRA)	Direct Énergie	+ 16"
7	Max Walscheid (GER)	Team Sunweb	+ 19"
8	Bryan Coquard (FRA)	Vital Concept	+ 19"
9	Emīls Liepiņš (LAT)	ONE Pro Cycling	+ 19"
10	Colin Joyce (USA)	Rally Cycling	+ 19"

=== Stage 2 ===
4 May 2018 — Barnsley to Ilkley, 149 km (92.6 miles)

Stage 2 result

Rank	Rider	Team	Time
1	Magnus Cort Nielsen (DEN)	Astana	3h 25' 34"
2	Greg Van Avermaet (BEL)	BMC Racing Team	+ 0"
3	Eduard Prades (ESP)	Euskadi–Murias	+ 0"
4	Serge Pauwels (BEL)	Team Dimension Data	+ 0"
5	Jonathan Hivert (FRA)	Direct Énergie	+ 5"
6	Robert Kišerlovski (CRO)	Team Katusha–Alpecin	+ 5"
7	Michael Storer (AUS)	Team Sunweb	+ 5"
8	Colin Joyce (USA)	Rally Cycling	+ 5"
9	Steff Cras (BEL)	Team Katusha–Alpecin	+ 11"
10	Brent Bookwalter (USA)	BMC Racing Team	+ 11"

General classification after stage 2

Rank	Rider	Team	Time
1	Magnus Cort Nielsen (DEN)	Astana	7h 33' 41"
2	Greg Van Avermaet (BEL)	BMC Racing Team	+ 4"
3	Eduard Prades (ESP)	Euskadi–Murias	+ 6"
4	Serge Pauwels (BEL)	Team Dimension Data	+ 10"
5	Colin Joyce (USA)	Rally Cycling	+ 15"
6	Robert Kiserlovski (CRO)	Team Katusha–Alpecin	+ 15"
7	Jonathan Hivert (FRA)	Direct Énergie	+ 15"
8	Michael Storer (AUS)	Team Sunweb	+ 15"
9	Brent Bookwalter (USA)	BMC Racing Team	+ 21"
10	Steff Cras (BEL)	Team Katusha–Alpecin	+ 21"

=== Stage 3 ===
5 May 2018 — Richmond to Scarborough, 184 km (114.3 miles)

Stage 3 result

Rank	Rider	Team	Time
1	Max Walscheid (GER)	Team Sunweb	4h 10' 27"
2	Magnus Cort Nielsen (DEN)	Astana	+ 0"
3	Jon Aberasturi (ESP)	Euskadi–Murias	+ 0"
4	Bryan Coquard (FRA)	Vital Concept	+ 0"
5	Robert-Jon McCarthy (IRL)	JLT–Condor	+ 0"
6	Connor Swift (GBR)	Madison Genesis	+ 0"
7	Mike Teunissen (NED)	Team Sunweb	+ 0"
8	Greg Van Avermaet (BEL)	BMC Racing Team	+ 0"
9	Emīls Liepiņš (LAT)	ONE Pro Cycling	+ 0"
10	Colin Joyce (USA)	Rally Cycling	+ 0"

General classification after stage 3

Rank	Rider	Team	Time
1	Magnus Cort Nielsen (DEN)	Astana	11h 44' 02"
2	Greg Van Avermaet (BEL)	BMC Racing Team	+ 10"
3	Eduard Prades (ESP)	Euskadi–Murias	+ 12"
4	Colin Joyce (USA)	Rally Cycling	+ 21"
5	Robert Kišerlovski (CRO)	Team Katusha–Alpecin	+ 21"
6	Brent Bookwalter (USA)	BMC Racing Team	+ 27"
7	Steff Cras (BEL)	Team Katusha–Alpecin	+ 27"
8	Etienne van Empel (NED)	Roompot–Nederlandse Loterij	+ 29"
9	Ian Bibby (GBR)	JLT–Condor	+ 29"
10	Patrick Bevin (NZL)	BMC Racing Team	+ 39"

=== Stage 4 ===
6 May 2018 — Halifax to Leeds, 189.5 km (117.7 miles)

Stage 4 result

Rank	Rider	Team	Time
1	Stéphane Rossetto (FRA)	Cofidis	4h 53' 22"
2	Greg Van Avermaet (BEL)	BMC Racing Team	+ 34"
3	Ian Bibby (GBR)	JLT–Condor	+ 34"
4	Edward Dunbar (IRL)	Aqua Blue Sport	+ 34"
5	Eduard Prades (ESP)	Euskadi–Murias	+ 34"
6	Anthony Perez (FRA)	Cofidis	+ 34"
7	Jonathan Hivert (FRA)	Direct Énergie	+ 34"
8	Serge Pauwels (BEL)	Team Dimension Data	+ 34"
9	Robert Kišerlovski (CRO)	Team Katusha–Alpecin	+ 34"
10	Michael Storer (AUS)	Team Sunweb	+ 34"

General classification after stage 4

Rank	Rider	Team	Time
1	Greg Van Avermaet (BEL)	BMC Racing Team	16h 38' 00"
2	Eduard Prades (ESP)	Euskadi–Murias	+ 9"
3	Serge Pauwels (BEL)	Team Dimension Data	+ 14"
4	Robert Kišerlovski (CRO)	Team Katusha–Alpecin	+ 19"
5	Michael Storer (AUS)	Team Sunweb	+ 19"
6	Ian Bibby (GBR)	JLT–Condor	+ 23"
7	Anthony Perez (FRA)	Cofidis	+ 25"
8	Edward Dunbar (IRL)	Aqua Blue Sport	+ 27"
9	Patrick Bevin (NZL)	BMC Racing Team	+ 37"
10	Jonathan Hivert (FRA)	Direct Énergie	+ 39"

== Classification leadership table ==
In the Tour de Yorkshire, four different jerseys were awarded. The general classification was calculated by adding each cyclist's finishing times on each stage. Time bonuses were awarded to the first three finishers on all stages: the stage winner won a ten-second bonus, with six and four seconds for the second and third riders respectively. Bonus seconds were also awarded to the first three riders at intermediate sprints; three seconds for the winner of the sprint, two seconds for the rider in second and one second for the rider in third. The leader of the general classification received a light blue and yellow jersey. This classification was considered the most important of the Tour de Yorkshire, and the winner of the classification was considered the winner of the race.

Points for the points classification
Position	1	2	3	4	5	6	7	8	9	10
Points awarded	15	12	9	7	6	5	4	3	2	1

The second classification was the points classification. Riders were awarded points for finishing in the top ten in a stage. Unlike in the points classification in the Tour de France, the winners of all stages were awarded the same number of points. Points were also won in intermediate sprints; five points for crossing the sprint line first, three points for second place and one for third. The leader of the points classification was awarded a green jersey.

Points for the mountains classification
Position	1	2	3
Points awarded	4	2	1

There was also a mountains classification, for which points were awarded for reaching the top of a climb before other riders. Each climb was categorised the same, with four points awarded to the first rider over the top of each climb. Two points were awarded for the second-placed rider, with one point for third place. The leadership of the mountains classification was marked by a pink jersey.

Another jersey was awarded at the end of each stage. This was a combativity prize and was awarded to the rider who "made the greatest effort and [...] demonstrated the best qualities in terms of sportsmanship". A jury selected a list of riders to be eligible for the prize; the winner of the prize was then decided by a vote on Twitter. The rider was awarded a grey jersey. There was also a classification for teams, in which the times of the best three cyclists in a team on each stage were added together; the leading team at the end of the race was the team with the lowest cumulative time.

Stage	Winner	General classification	Points classification	Mountains classification	Combativity prize	Teams classification
1	Harry Tanfield	Harry Tanfield	Harry Tanfield	Mike Cuming	Harry Tanfield	Madison Genesis
2	Magnus Cort	Magnus Cort	Harry Tanfield	Mike Cuming	Tom Baylis	BMC Racing Team
3	Max Walscheid	Magnus Cort	Magnus Cort	Mike Cuming	Peter Williams	BMC Racing Team
4	Stéphane Rossetto	Greg van Avermaet	Greg van Avermaet	Stéphane Rossetto	Stéphane Rossetto	BMC Racing Team
Final		Greg van Avermaet	Greg Van Avermaet	Stéphane Rossetto	Not Awarded	BMC Racing Team
