= 2017 Tour de Yorkshire =

3rd men's Tour de Yorkshire

2017 UCI Europe Tour

Race details
- Dates: 28–30 April 2017
- Stages: 3
- Distance: 491 km (305 mi)
- Winning time: 11h 53' 04"

Results
Jersey awarded to the overall winner	Winner	Serge Pauwels (BEL)	(Team Dimension Data)
	Second	Omar Fraile (ESP)	(Team Dimension Data)
	Third	Jonathan Hivert (FRA)	(Direct Énergie)
Jersey awarded to the points classification winner	Points	Caleb Ewan (AUS)	(Orica–Scott)
Jersey awarded to the mountains classification winner	Mountains	Pieter Weening (NED)	(Roompot–Nederlandse Loterij)
	Team	Team Dimension Data	

The 2017 Tour de Yorkshire was a three-day cycling stage race staged in Yorkshire over 28–30 April 2017. It was the third edition of the Tour de Yorkshire, organised by Welcome to Yorkshire and the Amaury Sport Organisation.

The race was won by Team Dimension Data rider Serge Pauwels of Belgium, after a strong performance from his team on the hilly final stage; Jacques Janse van Rensburg set Pauwels up for an attack on the Wigtwizzle climb and he went clear while Omar Fraile manned the chase group in support. After Pauwels had pulled out a gap, Fraile attacked and joined up with his team captain, setting up a tandem victory salute at the finish at Fox Valley in Stocksbridge, Sheffield. Pauwels won the race by six seconds over Fraile, while Direct Énergie's Jonathan Hivert completed the podium, one second further behind Fraile. The race's other classifications were won by Caleb Ewan (points for Orica–Scott), Pieter Weening (mountains for Roompot–Nederlandse Loterij), and Team Dimension Data (teams classification).

== Route ==
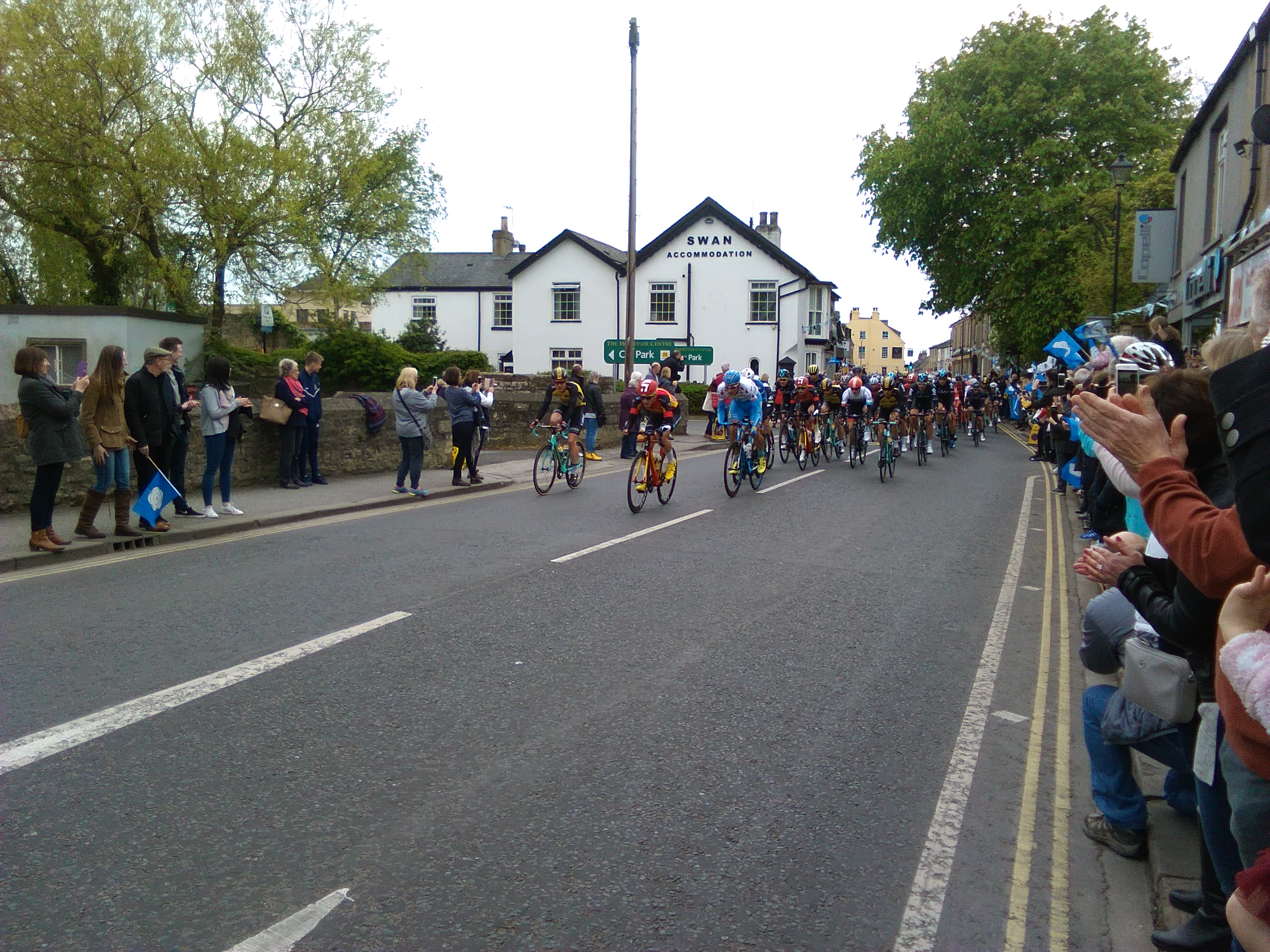
The second day of the 2017 Tour de Yorkshire going through Wetherby, West Yorkshire.

On 25 October 2016, the start and finish locations for the event were released: these were Bridlington, Scarborough, Tadcaster, Harrogate, Bradford and Sheffield.

The stage routes were released on 2 December 2016. The routes were Bridlington to Scarborough, Tadcaster to Harrogate and Bradford to Sheffield. The women's race was to be held on Saturday 29 April, over the Tadcaster to Harrogate route.

Stage characteristics and winners
Stage	Date	Start	Finish	Length	Type	Winner
1	28 April	Bridlington	Scarborough	174 km (108.1 miles)	Hilly stage	Dylan Groenewegen (NED)
2	29 April	Tadcaster	Harrogate	122.5 km (76.1 miles)	Hilly stage	Nacer Bouhanni (FRA)
3	30 April	Bradford	Sheffield	194.5 km (120.9 miles)	Medium-mountain stage	Serge Pauwels (BEL)

== Teams ==
18 teams were selected to take part in Tour de Yorkshire. Seven of these were UCI WorldTeams, with five UCI Professional Continental teams, five UCI Continental teams and a Great Britain national team. Teams could enter between five and eight riders.

UCI WorldTeams

- BMC Racing Team
- Team Dimension Data
- Team Katusha–Alpecin
- LottoNL–Jumbo
- Orica–Scott
- Team Sky
- Team Sunweb

UCI Professional Continental teams

- Aqua Blue Sport
- Cofidis
- Delko–Marseille Provence KTM
- Direct Énergie
- Roompot–Nederlandse Loterij

UCI Continental teams

- Bike Channel–Canyon
- JLT–Condor
- Madison Genesis
- ONE Pro Cycling
- Team Raleigh–GAC

National teams

- Great Britain

== Stages ==
=== Stage 1 ===
28 April 2017 — Bridlington to Scarborough, 174 km (108.1 miles)

Result of Stage 1
Rank	Rider	Team	Time
1	Dylan Groenewegen (NED)	LottoNL–Jumbo	4h 09' 38"
2	Caleb Ewan (AUS)	Orica–Scott	+ 0"
3	Chris Opie (GBR)	Bike Channel–Canyon	+ 0"
4	Nacer Bouhanni (FRA)	Cofidis	+ 0"
5	Steele Von Hoff (AUS)	ONE Pro Cycling	+ 0"
6	Kristian Sbaragli (ITA)	Team Dimension Data	+ 0"
7	André Looij (NED)	Roompot–Nederlandse Loterij	+ 0"
8	Adam Blythe (GBR)	Aqua Blue Sport	+ 0"
9	Baptiste Planckaert (BEL)	Team Katusha–Alpecin	+ 0"
10	Enrique Sanz (ESP)	Team Raleigh–GAC	+ 0"

General classification after Stage 1
Rank	Rider	Team	Time
1	Dylan Groenewegen (NED)	LottoNL–Jumbo	4h 09' 28"
2	Caleb Ewan (AUS)	Orica–Scott	+ 4"
3	Chris Opie (GBR)	Bike Channel–Canyon	+ 6"
4	Ángel Madrazo (ESP)	Delko–Marseille Provence KTM	+ 8"
5	Nacer Bouhanni (FRA)	Cofidis	+ 10"
6	Steele Von Hoff (AUS)	ONE Pro Cycling	+ 10"
7	Kristian Sbaragli (ITA)	Team Dimension Data	+ 10"
8	André Looij (NED)	Roompot–Nederlandse Loterij	+ 10"
9	Adam Blythe (GBR)	Aqua Blue Sport	+ 10"
10	Baptiste Planckaert (BEL)	Team Katusha–Alpecin	+ 10"

=== Stage 2 ===
29 April 2017 — Tadcaster to Harrogate, 122.5 km (76.1 miles)

Result of Stage 2
Rank	Rider	Team	Time
1	Nacer Bouhanni (FRA)	Cofidis	2h 45' 51"
2	Caleb Ewan (AUS)	Orica–Scott	+ 0"
3	Jonathan Hivert (FRA)	Direct Énergie	+ 0"
4	Dylan Groenewegen (NED)	LottoNL–Jumbo	+ 0"
5	Chris Lawless (GBR)	Great Britain (national team)	+ 0"
6	Kristian Sbaragli (ITA)	Team Dimension Data	+ 0"
7	Søren Kragh Andersen (DEN)	Team Sunweb	+ 0"
8	Tony Hurel (FRA)	Direct Énergie	+ 0"
9	Matt Holmes (GBR)	Madison Genesis	+ 0"
10	Adam Blythe (GBR)	Aqua Blue Sport	+ 0"

General classification after Stage 2
Rank	Rider	Team	Time
1	Caleb Ewan (AUS)	Orica–Scott	6h 55' 17"
2	Nacer Bouhanni (FRA)	Cofidis	+ 2"
3	Dylan Groenewegen (NED)	LottoNL–Jumbo	+ 2"
4	Chris Opie (GBR)	Bike Channel–Canyon	+ 8"
5	Jonathan Hivert (FRA)	Direct Énergie	+ 8"
6	Ángel Madrazo (ESP)	Delko–Marseille Provence KTM	+ 10"
7	Kristian Sbaragli (ITA)	Team Dimension Data	+ 12"
8	Steele Von Hoff (AUS)	ONE Pro Cycling	+ 12"
9	Adam Blythe (GBR)	Aqua Blue Sport	+ 12"
10	Søren Kragh Andersen (DEN)	Team Sunweb	+ 12"

=== Stage 3 ===
30 April 2017 — Bradford to Sheffield, 194.5 km (120.9 miles)

Result of Stage 3
Rank	Rider	Team	Time
1	Serge Pauwels (BEL)	Team Dimension Data	4h 57' 47"
2	Omar Fraile (ESP)	Team Dimension Data	+ 0"
3	Jonathan Hivert (FRA)	Direct Énergie	+ 6"
4	Brent Bookwalter (USA)	BMC Racing Team	+ 6"
5	Tao Geoghegan Hart (GBR)	Team Sky	+ 8"
6	Maurits Lammertink (NED)	Team Katusha–Alpecin	+ 8"
7	Matt Holmes (GBR)	Madison Genesis	+ 8"
8	Mark Christian (GBR)	Aqua Blue Sport	+ 8"
9	Lennard Hofstede (NED)	Team Sunweb	+ 8"
10	Joey Rosskopf (USA)	BMC Racing Team	+ 23"

Final general classification
Rank	Rider	Team	Time
1	Serge Pauwels (BEL)	Team Dimension Data	11h 53' 04"
2	Omar Fraile (ESP)	Team Dimension Data	+ 6"
3	Jonathan Hivert (FRA)	Direct Énergie	+ 7"
4	Brent Bookwalter (USA)	BMC Racing Team	+ 18"
5	Matt Holmes (GBR)	Madison Genesis	+ 20"
6	Maurits Lammertink (NED)	Team Katusha–Alpecin	+ 20"
7	Mark Christian (GBR)	Aqua Blue Sport	+ 20"
8	Tao Geoghegan Hart (GBR)	Team Sky	+ 20"
9	Lennard Hofstede (NED)	Team Sunweb	+ 20"
10	Joey Rosskopf (USA)	BMC Racing Team	+ 35"

== Classification leadership table ==
In the 2017 Tour de Yorkshire, four different jerseys were awarded. The general classification was calculated by adding each cyclist's finishing times on each stage. Time bonuses were awarded to the first three finishers on all stages: the stage winner won a ten-second bonus, with six and four seconds for the second and third riders respectively. Bonus seconds were also awarded to the first three riders at intermediate sprints; three seconds for the winner of the sprint, two seconds for the rider in second and one second for the rider in third. The leader of the general classification received a light blue and yellow jersey. This classification was considered the most important of the 2017 Tour de Yorkshire, and the winner of the classification was considered the winner of the race.

Points for the points classification
Position	1	2	3	4	5	6	7	8	9	10
Points awarded	15	12	9	7	6	5	4	3	2	1

The second classification was the points classification. Riders were awarded points for finishing in the top ten in a stage. Unlike in the points classification in the Tour de France, the winners of all stages were awarded the same number of points. Points were also won in intermediate sprints; five points for crossing the sprint line first, three points for second place and one for third. The leader of the points classification was awarded a green jersey.

Points for the mountains classification
Position	1	2	3
Points awarded	4	2	1

There was also a mountains classification, for which points were awarded for reaching the top of a climb before other riders. Each climb was categorised the same, with four points awarded to the first rider over the top of each climb. Two points were awarded for the second-placed rider, with one point for third place. The leadership of the mountains classification was marked by a pink jersey.

Another jersey was awarded at the end of each stage. This was a combativity prize and was awarded to the rider who "made the greatest effort and [...] demonstrated the best qualities in terms of sportsmanship". A jury selected a list of riders to be eligible for the prize; the winner of the prize was then decided by a vote on Twitter. The rider was awarded a grey jersey. There was also a classification for teams, in which the times of the best three cyclists in a team on each stage were added together; the leading team at the end of the race was the team with the lowest cumulative time.

Stage	Winner	General classification	Points classification	Mountains classification	Combativity prize	Teams classification
1	Dylan Groenewegen	Dylan Groenewegen	Dylan Groenewegen	Etienne van Empel	Conor Dunne	LottoNL–Jumbo
2	Nacer Bouhanni	Caleb Ewan	Caleb Ewan	Etienne van Empel	Harry Tanfield	Team Dimension Data
3	Serge Pauwels	Serge Pauwels	Caleb Ewan	Pieter Weening	Dexter Gardias	Team Dimension Data
Final		Serge Pauwels	Caleb Ewan	Pieter Weening	Not awarded	Team Dimension Data
