= Tour de Yorkshire =

Cycling competition held in Yorkshire

Race details
- Date: April/May
- Region: Yorkshire, England, UK
- Discipline: Road
- Competition: UCI Europe Tour
- Type: Stage race
- Organiser: Amaury Sport Organisation / Silicon Dales
- Web site: letour.yorkshire.com

History
- First edition: 2015
- Editions: 5 (as of 2019)
- First winner: Lars Petter Nordhaug (NOR)
- Most wins: No repeat winners
- Most recent: Chris Lawless (GBR)

The Tour de Yorkshire was a road cycling race in the historic county of Yorkshire, England which first took place in May 2015. It was promoted by the Amaury Sport Organisation (ASO) and was rated as a 2.HC event as part of the UCI Europe Tour.

The idea for the race arose as a legacy event following the success of the visit of the 2014 Tour de France to the county. The first two stages of the 2014 Tour, also organised by ASO, from Leeds to Harrogate, and York to Sheffield, were nicknamed Le Tour de Yorkshire. From 2015 to 2017 it was a three-day race but in 2018 it expanded to four days. The race took place in the days before the May Day bank holiday which, in Britain, is on the first Monday in May. The race was to become part of the new UCI ProSeries in 2020 but that was cancelled due to COVID-19. The 2021, 2022 and 2023 tours were also cancelled.

== History ==
=== 2015 ===
Taking place from 1–3 May, the route was Bridlington–Scarborough, Selby–York, and Wakefield–Leeds. The overall winner was Lars Petter Nordhaug of Team Sky. Samuel Sánchez (BMC Racing Team) was second and Thomas Voeckler (Team Europcar) was third. Nordhaug also won the points classification and Team Sky won the teams classification. The mountains classification was won by Nicolas Edet (Cofidis).

=== 2016 ===
This took place from 29 April – 1 May (British Cycling had rejected an application by the organisers Welcome to Yorkshire and ASO to increase the race to four days for 2016), and the route was Beverley–Settle, Otley–Doncaster, and Middlesbrough–Scarborough.

=== 2017 ===
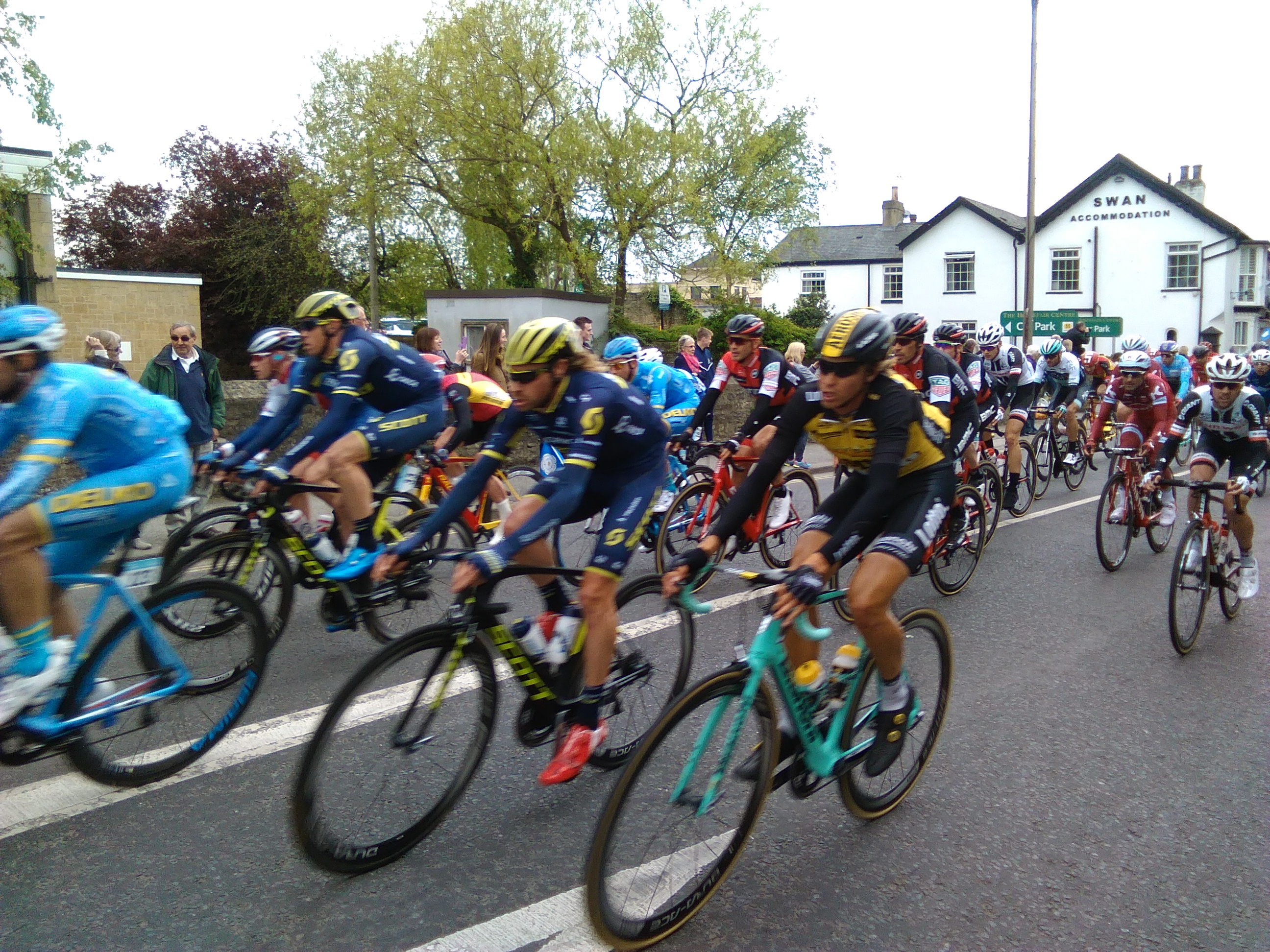
The peloton passes through Wetherby, West Yorkshire on the second day of the 2017 tour.

The 2017 Tour was on 28–30 April, with starting or finishing places of Bradford, Bridlington, Harrogate, Scarborough, Sheffield and Tadcaster. It was later announced the route would be Bridlington–Scarborough, Tadcaster–Harrogate and Bradford–Sheffield with the women's race on the Tadcaster–Harrogate section.

=== 2018 ===
The tour was extended to four days running from Thursday 3 May to Sunday 6 May. On 28 September 2017, the start and finish points of the stages were announced as Barnsley, Beverley, Doncaster, Halifax, Ilkley, Leeds, Richmond, and Scarborough. It was later announced that the stages would be Beverley–Doncaster, Barnsley–Ilkley, Richmond–Scarborough and Halifax–Leeds, the women's race would be on part of the first two stages. It is estimated that this year's event bought in £98 million to the Yorkshire economy.

=== 2019 ===
In October 2018, it was announced that Barnsley, Bedale, Bridlington, Doncaster, Halifax, Leeds, Scarborough and Selby would all be either start or finish points for the stages in the tour of 2019. At the same time, it was revealed that Redcar would be a host town in 2020.

In the same month, the world governing body for the sport (UCI), announced that the tour had been upgraded to HC status, the highest status for a multi-stage race which is not part of the world tour. Sir Gary Verity, the race organiser and chair of Welcome to Yorkshire said

That's a great honour for us to get the upgrade to HC, that's one below world tour status. To have hors categorie for our race, there are not many races in the world that in such a short space of time have gone from not existing to getting HC status. That's almost unprecedented so we're really, really pleased about that.

In December 2018, the stages were announced as running from Thursday 2 May to Sunday 5 May 2019; Doncaster–Selby (stage one; The Heritage Stage), Barnsley–Bedale (stage two; The World Stage), Bridlington–Scarborough (stage three; The Yorkshire Coast) and Halifax–Leeds (stage four; The Yorkshire Classic). The women's stages would be Barnsley–Bedale (stage one) and Bridlington–Scarborough (stage two).

=== 2020 to 2022 ===
The 2020 tour was scheduled to run from 30 April to 3 May with stages from Beverley to Redcar, Skipton to Leyburn, Barnsley to Huddersfield and Halifax to Leeds. The 2020 tour was cancelled in March 2020, due to the coronavirus outbreak in the United Kingdom. The 2021 Tour was cancelled in November 2020 and the 2022 Tour was cancelled in August 2021.

=== Future ===
After Welcome to Yorkshire went into administration, the future of the event was put into question. The rights to the race were bought at auction, as part of a package of assets, by the company Silicon Dales. The Managing Director of Silicon Dales said it was hoped to get the race running again for the 10th anniversary of the 2014 Yorkshire Grand Depart in 2024. Subsequent negotiations between the new owners of Welcome to Yorkshire and ASO to revive the Tour de Yorkshire for 2024 failed, but there are still hopes for a similar event to continue the race's legacy in 2024.

== Impact ==
The Tour de Yorkshire has had a significant benefit to Yorkshire in terms of monetary gain and exposure to the world. In 2015 it generated £50 million for the Yorkshire economy, £60 million in 2016, £64 million in 2017, £98 million in 2018, and £60 million in 2019. It was estimated that the broadcast coverage of the event in 2017 was viewed by 9.7 million people across the world with over 2 million spectators lining the route.

The 2018 Tour attracted crowds of about 2.6 million people, which The Times newspaper estimated to be the largest spectator event in the United Kingdom. The spectators who lined the route spent 54% more on hospitality than on the previous TdY from 2017. Welcome to Yorkshire was reported to be in talks with the organisers of the Vuelta, in the hope to bring that road cycling event to Yorkshire in the future. During its 80-year history, the event has only held a stage outside of Spain three times before.

== Winners ==
Year	Country	Rider	Team
2015	Norway	Lars Petter Nordhaug	Team Sky
2016	France	Thomas Voeckler	Direct Énergie
2017	Belgium	Serge Pauwels	Team Dimension Data
2018	Belgium	Greg Van Avermaet	BMC Racing Team
2019	Great Britain	Chris Lawless	Team Ineos
2020	No race due to the COVID-19 pandemic.		
2021	No race due to the COVID-19 pandemic.		
2022	No race due to financial problems.		

== See also ==
- Welcome to Yorkshire
- 2019 UCI Road World Championships
