= 2018 Clásica de Almería =

2018 UCI Europe Tour

Race details
- Dates: 11 February 2018
- Stages: 1
- Distance: 185.1 km (115.0 mi)
- Winning time: 4h 35' 28"

Results
	Winner	Caleb Ewan (AUS)
	Second	Danny van Poppel (NED)
	Third	Timothy Dupont (BEL)

The 2018 Clásica de Almería was the 33rd edition of the Clásica de Almería road cycling one day race. It was part of UCI Europe Tour in category 1.HC.

== Teams ==
Twenty teams of up to seven riders started the race:

UCI WorldTeams

- Bora–Hansgrohe
- Team Katusha–Alpecin
- Quick-Step Floors
- LottoNL–Jumbo
- Astana
- Mitchelton–Scott
- Movistar Team

UCI Professional Continental teams

- Cofidis
- Gazprom–RusVelo
- Vérandas Willems–Crelan
- CCC–Sprandi–Polkowice
- Direct Énergie
- Rally Cycling
- Sport Vlaanderen–Baloise
- Wanty–Groupe Gobert
- Burgos BH
- Roompot–Nederlandse Loterij
- Caja Rural–Seguros RGA
- Euskadi–Murias

UCI Continental team

- Fundación Euskadi

== Result ==
Final general classification

Rank	Rider	Team	Time
1	Caleb Ewan (AUS)	Mitchelton–Scott	4h 35' 28"
2	Danny van Poppel (NED)	LottoNL–Jumbo	s.t.
3	Timothy Dupont (BEL)	Wanty–Groupe Gobert	s.t.
4	Hugo Hofstetter (FRA)	Cofidis	s.t.
5	Florian Sénéchal (FRA)	Quick-Step Floors	s.t.
6	Marko Kump (SLO)	CCC–Sprandi–Polkowice	s.t.
7	Mads Würtz Schmidt (DEN)	Team Katusha–Alpecin	s.t.
8	Carlos Barbero (ESP)	Movistar Team	s.t.
9	Edward Planckaert (BEL)	Sport Vlaanderen–Baloise	s.t.
10	Jon Aberasturi (ESP)	Euskadi–Murias	s.t.
