= Serge Pauwels =

Belgian racing cyclist

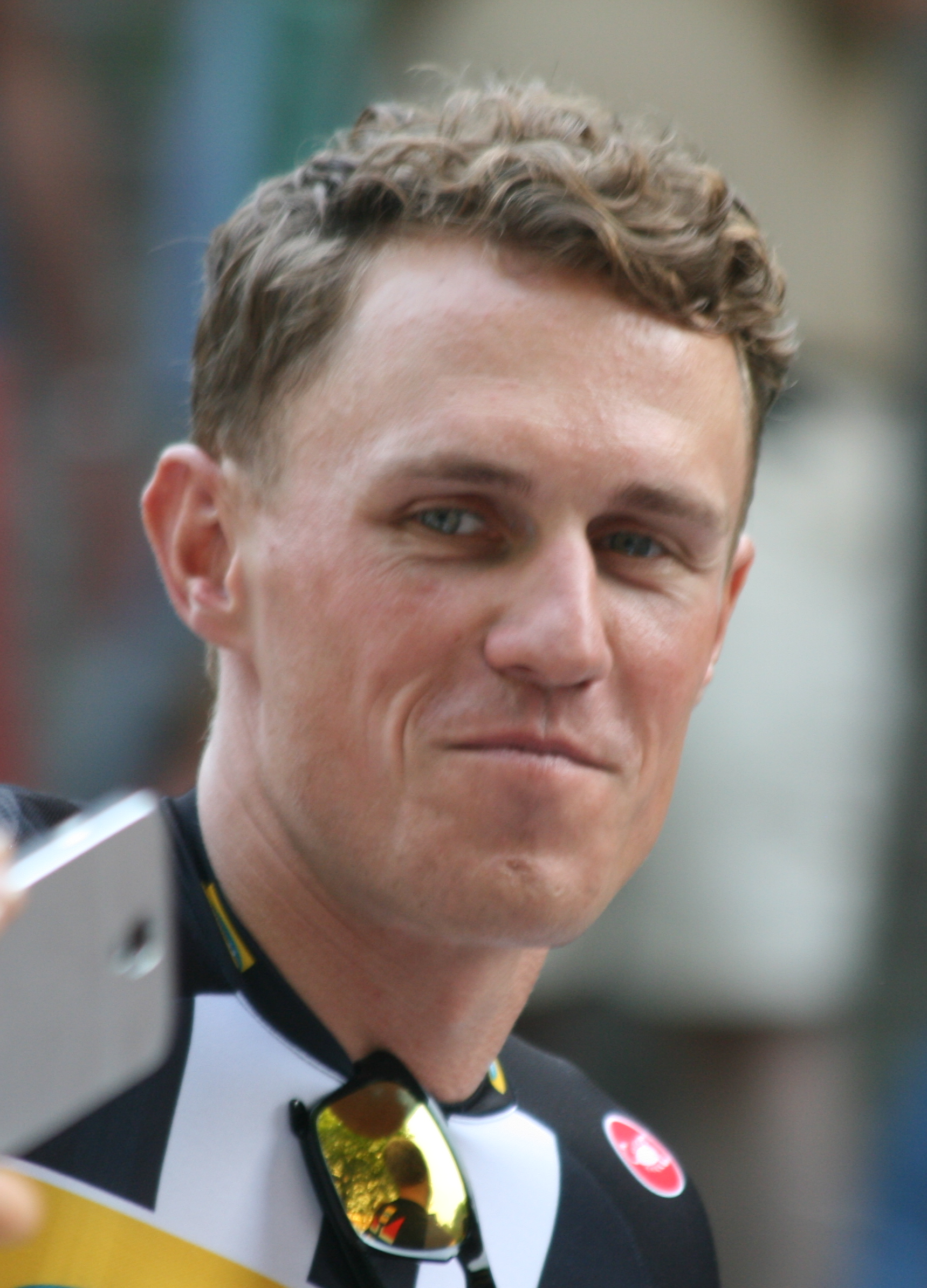
- Serge Pauwels in 2015

Personal information
- Full name: Serge Pauwels
- Nickname: Sergio
- Born: 21 November 1983 (age 42) Lier, Flanders, Belgium
- Height: 1.78 m (5 ft 10 in)
- Weight: 64 kg (141 lb)

Cycling career
- Sport: Cycling
- Current team: Retired
- Discipline: Road
- Role: Rider
- Rider type: Climber

Amateur team
- 2004–2005: Rabobank GS3

Professional teams
- 2006–2008: Chocolade Jacques–Topsport Vlaanderen
- 2009: Cervélo TestTeam
- 2010–2011: Team Sky
- 2012–2014: Omega Pharma–Quick-Step
- 2015–2018: MTN–Qhubeka
- 2019–2020: CCC Team

Major wins
- Stage races Tour de Yorkshire (2017)

Serge Pauwels (born 21 November 1983) is a Belgian former professional road racing cyclist, who rode professionally between 2006 and 2020, for Topsport Vlaanderen, the Cervélo TestTeam, Team Sky, Omega Pharma–Quick-Step, Team Dimension Data and the CCC Team.

== Cycling career ==
Born in Lier, Flanders, Pauwels' career kicked off in 2004 in the youth team of the Netherlands ProTeam Rabobank. He also rode for their Continental team in 2004 and 2005. Pauwels turned professional in 2006 with Chocolade Jacques–Topsport Vlaanderen, with whom he also rode in 2007 and 2008. Pauwels won the overall mountain ranking in the 2007 Tour Down Under and was second in the sixth stage of the 2006 Tour de l'Avenir in France.

After four years riding for Omega Pharma–Quick-Step, Pauwels announced in September 2014 that he would join MTN–Qhubeka from 2015 on a two-year contract.

After four years riding for Team Dimension Data, Pauwels transferred to CCC Team for the 2019 season.

== Major results ==
2003
5th Overall Grand Prix Guillaume Tell
10th Ronde van Vlaanderen U23
2004
9th Overall Tour des Pyrénées
2005
5th Liège–Bastogne–Liège U23
7th Overall Gran Premio Internacional del Oeste RTP
2006
4th Overall Tour de l'Avenir
8th Grand Prix de Wallonie
2007
1st Mountains classification Tour Down Under
2008
8th Overall Tour de Wallonie
9th Internationale Wielertrofee Jong Maar Moedig
2012
9th Overall Tour de l'Ain

1st Stage 2b (TTT)

2015
2nd International Road Cycling Challenge
5th Overall Tour of Turkey
2016
8th Trofeo Serra de Tramuntana
9th Overall Tour de Yorkshire
2017
1st Overall Tour de Yorkshire

1st Stage 3

2018
3rd Overall Tour de Yorkshire
8th Overall Volta ao Algarve

=== Grand Tour general classification results timeline ===
Grand Tour	2009	2010	2011	2012	2013	2014	2015	2016	2017	2018	2019
Giro d'Italia	33	—	—	47	77	31	—	—	—	—	—
Tour de France	—	107	—	—	—	—	13	42	19	DNF	77
/ Vuelta a España	—	—	—	24	31	—	—	—	DNF	—	—

Legend
—	Did not compete
DNF	Did not finish
