= Michael Cuming =

British cyclist

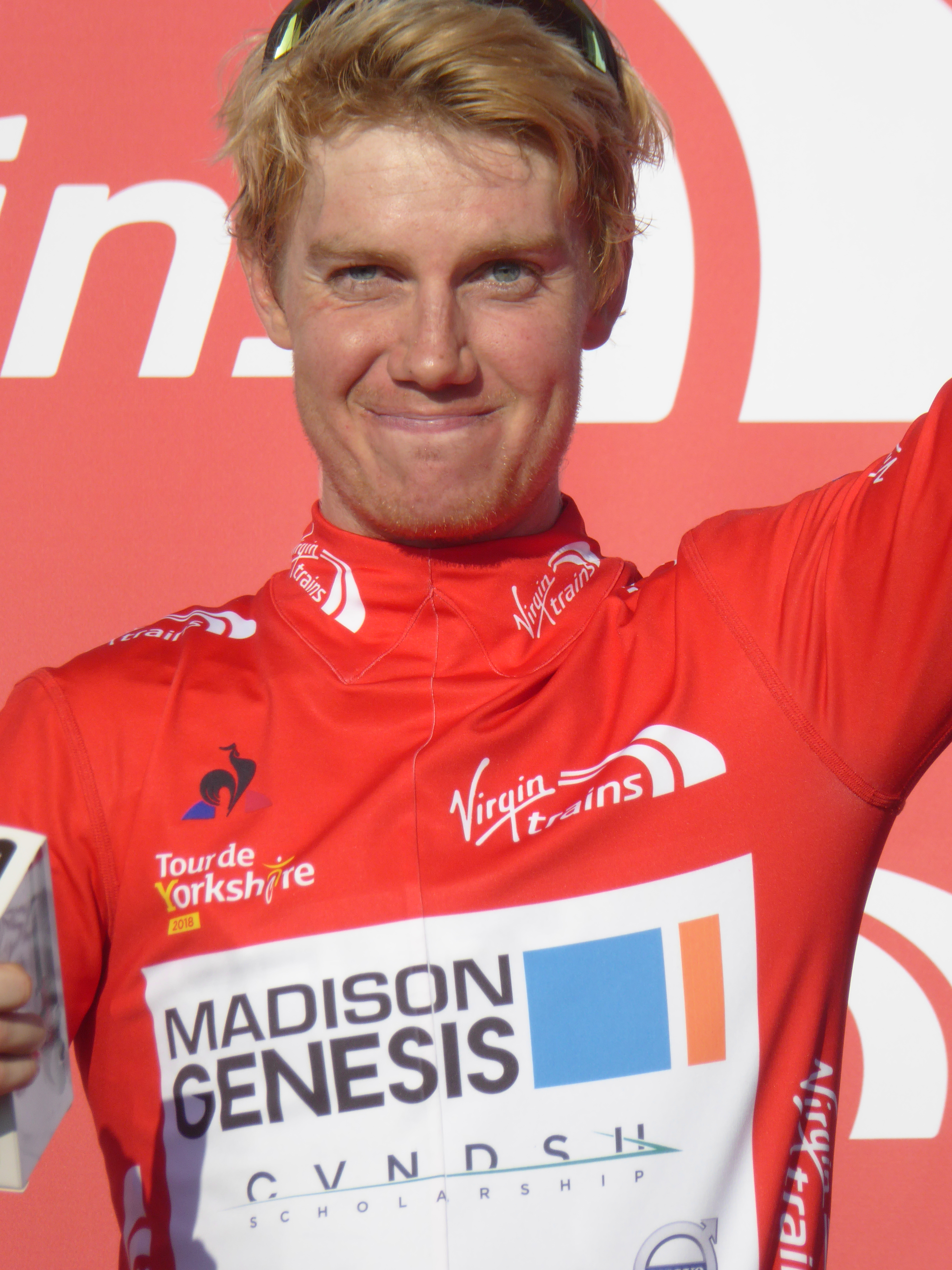
- Cuming at the 2018 Tour de Yorkshire

Personal information
- Full name: Michael Graham Cuming
- Born: 18 December 1990 (age 35) Macclesfield, England

Cycling career
- Sport: Cycling
- Discipline: Road
- Role: Rider

Professional teams
- 2010: Team Raleigh
- 2012–2015: Rapha Condor–Sharp
- 2016–2017: State of Matter MAAP Racing
- 2018–2019: Madison Genesis

Michael Graham Cuming (born 18 December 1990) is an English racing cyclist, who last rode for UCI Continental team Madison Genesis.

== Major results ==
2012
1st Road race, National Under-23 Road Championships
3rd Tobago Cycling Classic
2013
1st Overall Tour de Korea
2014
1st Prologue (TTT) Mzansi Tour
1st Stage 5 Tour de Korea
2016
1st Stage 5 New Zealand Cycle Classic
7th Overall Tour de Kumano
