= 2020 Tour Down Under =

Cycling race

2020 Men's Tour Down Under
2020 UCI World Tour, race 1 of 21

Race details
- Dates: 21–26 January 2020
- Stages: 6
- Distance: 870.2 km (540.7 mi)
- Winning time: 20h 37' 08"

Results
Jersey awarded to the overall winner	Winner	Richie Porte (AUS)	(Trek–Segafredo)
	Second	Diego Ulissi (ITA)	(UAE Team Emirates)
	Third	Simon Geschke (GER)	(CCC Team)
Jersey awarded to the mountains classification winner	Mountains	Joey Rosskopf (USA)	(CCC Team)
Jersey awarded to the young rider classification winner	Young rider	Pavel Sivakov (RUS)	(Team INEOS)
Jersey awarded to the sprints classification winner	Sprints	Jasper Philipsen (BEL)	(UAE Team Emirates)
	Team	Team INEOS	

The 2020 Men's Tour Down Under was a road cycling stage race that took place between 21 and 26 January 2020 in and around Adelaide, South Australia. It was the 22nd edition of the Tour Down Under and the first race of the 2020 UCI World Tour.

The race was won by Australian rider Richie Porte of Trek–Segafredo.

== Teams ==
All nineteen UCI WorldTeams were invited automatically and obliged to enter a team of up to seven riders into the race. Along with an Australian national team, there are twenty teams in the race. Of the 140 riders that started the race, 132 riders finished.

UCI WorldTeams

- AG2R La Mondiale
- Astana
- Bahrain–McLaren
- Bora–Hansgrohe
- CCC Team
- Cofidis
- Deceuninck–Quick-Step
- EF Pro Cycling
- Groupama–FDJ
- Israel Start-Up Nation
- Lotto–Soudal
- Mitchelton–Scott
- Movistar Team
- NTT Pro Cycling
- Team INEOS
- Team Jumbo–Visma
- Team Sunweb
- Trek–Segafredo
- UAE Team Emirates

National Teams

- UniSA–Australia

== Route ==
Stage characteristics and winners
Stage	Date	Route	Distance	Type	Winner
1	21 January	Tanunda to Tanunda	150 km (93.2 mi)	Flat stage	Sam Bennett (IRL)
2	22 January	Woodside to Stirling	135.8 km (84.4 mi)	Flat stage	Caleb Ewan (AUS)
3	23 January	Unley to Paracombe	131 km (81.4 mi)	Hilly stage	Richie Porte (AUS)
4	24 January	Norwood to Murray Bridge	152.8 km (94.9 mi)	Hilly stage	Caleb Ewan (AUS)
5	25 January	Glenelg to Victor Harbor	149.1 km (92.6 mi)	Flat stage	Giacomo Nizzolo (ITA)
6	26 January	McLaren Vale to Willunga Hill	151.5 km (94.1 mi)	Hilly stage	Matthew Holmes (GBR)
Total		870.2 km (540.7 mi)			

== Stages ==
=== Stage 1 ===
21 January 2020 — Tanunda to Tanunda, 150 km (93 mi)

Stage 1 Result
Rank	Rider	Team	Time
1	Sam Bennett (IRL)	Deceuninck–Quick-Step	3h 28' 54"
2	Jasper Philipsen (BEL)	UAE Team Emirates	+ 0"
3	Erik Baška (SVK)	Bora–Hansgrohe	+ 0"
4	Elia Viviani (ITA)	Cofidis	+ 0"
5	André Greipel (GER)	Israel Start-Up Nation	+ 0"
6	Kristoffer Halvorsen (NOR)	EF Pro Cycling	+ 0"
7	Caleb Ewan (AUS)	Lotto–Soudal	+ 0"
8	Marc Sarreau (FRA)	Groupama–FDJ	+ 0"
9	Sam Welsford (AUS)	UniSA–Australia	+ 0"
10	Alberto Dainese (ITA)	Team Sunweb	+ 0"

General classification after Stage 1
Rank	Rider	Team	Time
1	Sam Bennett (IRL)	Deceuninck–Quick-Step	3h 28' 44"
2	Jasper Philipsen (BEL)	UAE Team Emirates	+ 4"
3	Erik Baška (SVK)	Bora–Hansgrohe	+ 6"
4	Daryl Impey (RSA)	Mitchelton–Scott	+ 7"
5	Jarrad Drizners (AUS)	UniSA–Australia	+ 7"
6	Chris Lawless (GBR)	Team INEOS	+ 8"
7	Dylan Sunderland (AUS)	NTT Pro Cycling	+ 8"
8	Nathan Haas (AUS)	Cofidis	+ 9"
9	Michael Storer (AUS)	Team Sunweb	+ 9"
10	Elia Viviani (ITA)	Cofidis	+ 10"

=== Stage 2 ===
22 January 2020 — Woodside to Stirling, 135.8 km (84 mi)

Stage 2 Result
Rank	Rider	Team	Time
1	Caleb Ewan (AUS)	Lotto–Soudal	3h 27' 31"
2	Daryl Impey (RSA)	Mitchelton–Scott	+ 0"
3	Nathan Haas (AUS)	Cofidis	+ 0"
4	Jasper Philipsen (BEL)	UAE Team Emirates	+ 0"
5	Fabio Felline (ITA)	Astana	+ 0"
6	Andrea Vendrame (ITA)	AG2R La Mondiale	+ 0"
7	Timo Roosen (NED)	Team Jumbo–Visma	+ 0"
8	Luis León Sánchez (ESP)	Astana	+ 0"
9	Diego Ulissi (ITA)	UAE Team Emirates	+ 0"
10	George Bennett (NZL)	Team Jumbo–Visma	+ 0"

General classification after Stage 2
Rank	Rider	Team	Time
1	Caleb Ewan (AUS)	Lotto–Soudal	6h 56' 15"
2	Sam Bennett (IRL)	Deceuninck–Quick-Step	+ 0"
3	Daryl Impey (RSA)	Mitchelton–Scott	+ 1"
4	Jasper Philipsen (BEL)	UAE Team Emirates	+ 4"
5	Nathan Haas (AUS)	Cofidis	+ 5"
6	Jarrad Drizners (AUS)	UniSA–Australia	+ 7"
7	Dylan Sunderland (AUS)	NTT Pro Cycling	+ 8"
8	Chris Lawless (GBR)	Team INEOS	+ 8"
9	Jay McCarthy (AUS)	Bora–Hansgrohe	+ 8"
10	George Bennett (NZL)	Team Jumbo–Visma	+ 9"

=== Stage 3 ===
23 January 2020 — Unley to Paracombe, 131 km (81.4 mi)

Stage 3 Result
Rank	Rider	Team	Time
1	Richie Porte (AUS)	Trek–Segafredo	3h 14' 09"
2	Robert Power (AUS)	Team Sunweb	+ 5"
3	Simon Yates (GBR)	Mitchelton–Scott	+ 5"
4	Rohan Dennis (AUS)	Team INEOS	+ 5"
5	Diego Ulissi (ITA)	UAE Team Emirates	+ 5"
6	Daryl Impey (RSA)	Mitchelton–Scott	+ 5"
7	Dylan van Baarle (NED)	Team INEOS	+ 5"
8	Simon Geschke (GER)	CCC Team	+ 5"
9	George Bennett (NZL)	Team Jumbo–Visma	+ 5"
10	Lucas Hamilton (AUS)	Mitchelton–Scott	+ 13"

General classification after Stage 3
Rank	Rider	Team	Time
1	Richie Porte (AUS)	Trek–Segafredo	10h 10' 24"
2	Daryl Impey (RSA)	Mitchelton–Scott	+ 6"
3	Robert Power (AUS)	Team Sunweb	+ 9"
4	Simon Yates (GBR)	Mitchelton–Scott	+ 11"
5	George Bennett (NZL)	Team Jumbo–Visma	+ 14"
6	Diego Ulissi (ITA)	UAE Team Emirates	+ 15"
7	Simon Geschke (GER)	CCC Team	+ 15"
8	Rohan Dennis (AUS)	Team INEOS	+ 15"
9	Dylan van Baarle (NED)	Team INEOS	+ 15"
10	Lucas Hamilton (AUS)	Mitchelton–Scott	+ 23"

=== Stage 4 ===
24 January 2020 — Norwood to Murray Bridge, 152.8 km (94.9 mi)

Stage 4 Result
Rank	Rider	Team	Time
1	Caleb Ewan (AUS)	Lotto–Soudal	3h 29' 08"
2	Sam Bennett (IRL)	Deceuninck–Quick-Step	+ 0"
3	Jasper Philipsen (BEL)	UAE Team Emirates	+ 0"
4	André Greipel (GER)	Israel Start-Up Nation	+ 0"
5	Alberto Dainese (ITA)	Team Sunweb	+ 0"
6	Martin Laas (EST)	Bora–Hansgrohe	+ 0"
7	Giacomo Nizzolo (ITA)	NTT Pro Cycling	+ 0"
8	Erik Baška (SVK)	Bora–Hansgrohe	+ 0"
9	Marc Sarreau (FRA)	Groupama–FDJ	+ 0"
10	Michael Mørkøv (DEN)	Deceuninck–Quick-Step	+ 0"

General classification after Stage 4
Rank	Rider	Team	Time
1	Richie Porte (AUS)	Trek–Segafredo	13h 39' 32"
2	Daryl Impey (RSA)	Mitchelton–Scott	+ 3"
3	Robert Power (AUS)	Team Sunweb	+ 8"
4	Simon Yates (GBR)	Mitchelton–Scott	+ 11"
5	George Bennett (NZL)	Team Jumbo–Visma	+ 14"
6	Diego Ulissi (ITA)	UAE Team Emirates	+ 15"
7	Simon Geschke (GER)	CCC Team	+ 15"
8	Rohan Dennis (AUS)	Team INEOS	+ 15"
9	Dylan van Baarle (NED)	Team INEOS	+ 15"
10	Lucas Hamilton (AUS)	Mitchelton–Scott	+ 23"

=== Stage 5 ===
25 January 2020 — Glenelg to Victor Harbor, 149.1 km (92.6 mi)

Stage 5 Result
Rank	Rider	Team	Time
1	Giacomo Nizzolo (ITA)	NTT Pro Cycling	3h 32' 45"
2	Simone Consonni (ITA)	Cofidis	+ 0"
3	Sam Bennett (IRL)	Deceuninck–Quick-Step	+ 0"
4	Michael Mørkøv (DEN)	Deceuninck–Quick-Step	+ 0"
5	Jasper Philipsen (BEL)	UAE Team Emirates	+ 0"
6	André Greipel (GER)	Israel Start-Up Nation	+ 0"
7	Kristoffer Halvorsen (NOR)	EF Pro Cycling	+ 0"
8	Caleb Ewan (AUS)	Lotto–Soudal	+ 0"
9	Fabio Felline (ITA)	Astana	+ 0"
10	Daryl Impey (RSA)	Mitchelton–Scott	+ 0"

General classification after Stage 5
Rank	Rider	Team	Time
1	Daryl Impey (RSA)	Mitchelton–Scott	17h 12' 15"
2	Richie Porte (AUS)	Trek–Segafredo	+ 2"
3	Robert Power (AUS)	Team Sunweb	+ 9"
4	Simon Yates (GBR)	Mitchelton–Scott	+ 13"
5	George Bennett (NZL)	Team Jumbo–Visma	+ 16"
6	Diego Ulissi (ITA)	UAE Team Emirates	+ 17"
7	Simon Geschke (GER)	CCC Team	+ 17"
8	Rohan Dennis (AUS)	Team INEOS	+ 17"
9	Dylan van Baarle (NED)	Team INEOS	+ 17"
10	Lucas Hamilton (AUS)	Mitchelton–Scott	+ 25"

=== Stage 6 ===
26 January 2020 — McLaren Vale to Willunga Hill, 151.5 km (94.1 mi)

Stage 6 Result
Rank	Rider	Team	Time
1	Matthew Holmes (GBR)	Lotto–Soudal	3h 24' 54"
2	Richie Porte (AUS)	Trek–Segafredo	+ 3"
3	Manuele Boaro (ITA)	Astana	+ 4"
4	Bruno Armirail (FRA)	Groupama–FDJ	+ 7"
5	Michael Storer (AUS)	Team Sunweb	+ 7"
6	Diego Ulissi (ITA)	UAE Team Emirates	+ 7"
7	Simon Geschke (GER)	CCC Team	+ 7"
8	Rohan Dennis (AUS)	Team INEOS	+ 7"
9	Dylan van Baarle (NED)	Team INEOS	+ 7"
10	Simon Yates (GBR)	Mitchelton–Scott	+ 23"

General classification after Stage 6
Rank	Rider	Team	Time
1	Richie Porte (AUS)	Trek–Segafredo	20h 37' 08"
2	Diego Ulissi (ITA)	UAE Team Emirates	+ 25"
3	Simon Geschke (GER)	CCC Team	+ 25"
4	Rohan Dennis (AUS)	Team INEOS	+ 25"
5	Dylan van Baarle (NED)	Team INEOS	+ 25"
6	Daryl Impey (RSA)	Mitchelton–Scott	+ 30"
7	Simon Yates (GBR)	Mitchelton–Scott	+ 37"
8	George Bennett (NZL)	Team Jumbo–Visma	+ 46"
9	Lucas Hamilton (AUS)	Mitchelton–Scott	+ 52"
10	Hermann Pernsteiner (AUT)	Bahrain–McLaren	+ 54"

== Classification leadership table ==
Classification leadership by stage
Stage	Winner	General classification	Mountains classification	Sprints classification	Young rider classification	Most competitive rider(s)	Team classification
1	Sam Bennett	Sam Bennett	Jarrad Drizners	Sam Bennett	Jasper Philipsen	Joey Rosskopf	UAE Team Emirates
2	Caleb Ewan	Caleb Ewan	Joey Rosskopf	Jasper Philipsen	Jasper Philipsen	Laurens De Vreese	UAE Team Emirates
3	Richie Porte	Richie Porte	Joey Rosskopf	Daryl Impey	Pavel Sivakov	Miles Scotson	Mitchelton–Scott
4	Caleb Ewan	Richie Porte	Joey Rosskopf	Jasper Philipsen	Pavel Sivakov	Laurens De Vreese	Mitchelton–Scott
5	Giacomo Nizzolo	Daryl Impey	Joey Rosskopf	Jasper Philipsen	Pavel Sivakov	Mads Pedersen	Mitchelton–Scott
6	Matthew Holmes	Richie Porte	Joey Rosskopf	Jasper Philipsen	Pavel Sivakov	Luke Rowe	Team INEOS
Final		Richie Porte	Joey Rosskopf	Jasper Philipsen	Pavel Sivakov	not awarded	Team INEOS

== Classification standings ==
Legend
Denotes the leader of the general classification	Denotes the leader of the mountains classification
Denotes the leader of the sprints classification	Denotes the leader of the young rider classification

=== General classification ===
Final general classification (1–10)
Rank	Rider	Team	Time
1	Richie Porte (AUS)	Trek–Segafredo	20h 37' 08"
2	Diego Ulissi (ITA)	UAE Team Emirates	+ 25"
3	Simon Geschke (GER)	CCC Team	+ 25"
4	Rohan Dennis (AUS)	Team INEOS	+ 25"
5	Dylan van Baarle (NED)	Team INEOS	+ 25"
6	Daryl Impey (RSA)	Mitchelton–Scott	+ 30"
7	Simon Yates (GBR)	Mitchelton–Scott	+ 37"
8	George Bennett (NZL)	Team Jumbo–Visma	+ 46"
9	Lucas Hamilton (AUS)	Mitchelton–Scott	+ 52"
10	Hermann Pernsteiner (AUT)	Bahrain–McLaren	+ 54"

=== Sprints classification ===
Final sprints classification (1–10)
Rank	Rider	Team	Points
1	Jasper Philipsen (BEL)	UAE Team Emirates	63
2	Daryl Impey (RSA)	Mitchelton–Scott	48
3	Caleb Ewan (AUS)	Lotto–Soudal	47
4	Sam Bennett (IRL)	Deceuninck–Quick-Step	42
5	André Greipel (GER)	Israel Start-Up Nation	38
6	Richie Porte (AUS)	Trek–Segafredo	29
7	Diego Ulissi (ITA)	UAE Team Emirates	28
8	Giacomo Nizzolo (ITA)	NTT Pro Cycling	24
9	Erik Baška (SVK)	Bora–Hansgrohe	21
10	Rohan Dennis (AUS)	Team INEOS	20

=== Mountains classification ===
Final mountains classification (1–10)
Rank	Rider	Team	Points
1	Joey Rosskopf (USA)	CCC Team	51
2	Richie Porte (AUS)	Trek–Segafredo	38
3	Bruno Armirail (FRA)	Groupama–FDJ	18
4	Matthew Holmes (GBR)	Lotto–Soudal	16
5	Manuele Boaro (ITA)	Astana	14
6	Simon Yates (GBR)	Mitchelton–Scott	12
7	Samuel Jenner (AUS)	UniSA–Australia	10
8	Dylan Sunderland (AUS)	NTT Pro Cycling	9
9	Daryl Impey (RSA)	Mitchelton–Scott	8
10	George Bennett (NZL)	Team Jumbo–Visma	8

=== Young rider classification ===
Final young rider classification (1–10)
Rank	Rider	Team	Time
1	Pavel Sivakov (RUS)	Team INEOS	20h 38' 13"
2	Santiago Buitrago (COL)	Bahrain–McLaren	+ 15"
3	Jarrad Drizners (AUS)	UniSA–Australia	+ 31"
4	Florian Stork (GER)	Team Sunweb	+ 34"
5	Michael Storer (AUS)	Team Sunweb	+ 3' 02"
6	Juan Pedro López (ESP)	Trek–Segafredo	+ 5' 51"
7	Samuele Battistella (ITA)	NTT Pro Cycling	+ 6' 21"
8	Juri Hollmann (GER)	Movistar Team	+ 8' 18"
9	João Almeida (POR)	Deceuninck–Quick-Step	+ 9' 41"
10	Jonas Rutsch (GER)	EF Pro Cycling	+ 11' 30"

=== Teams classification ===
Final teams classification (1–10)
Rank	Team	Time
1	Team INEOS	61h 53' 19"
2	Mitchelton–Scott	+ 25"
3	Team Sunweb	+ 1' 19"
4	Astana	+ 1' 30"
5	Bahrain–McLaren	+ 1' 32"
6	UAE Team Emirates	+ 1' 36"
7	Deceuninck–Quick-Step	+ 1' 50"
8	NTT Pro Cycling	+ 2' 52"
9	AG2R La Mondiale	+ 3' 38"
10	CCC Team	+ 5' 11"
