= Scott Thwaites =

British road cyclist

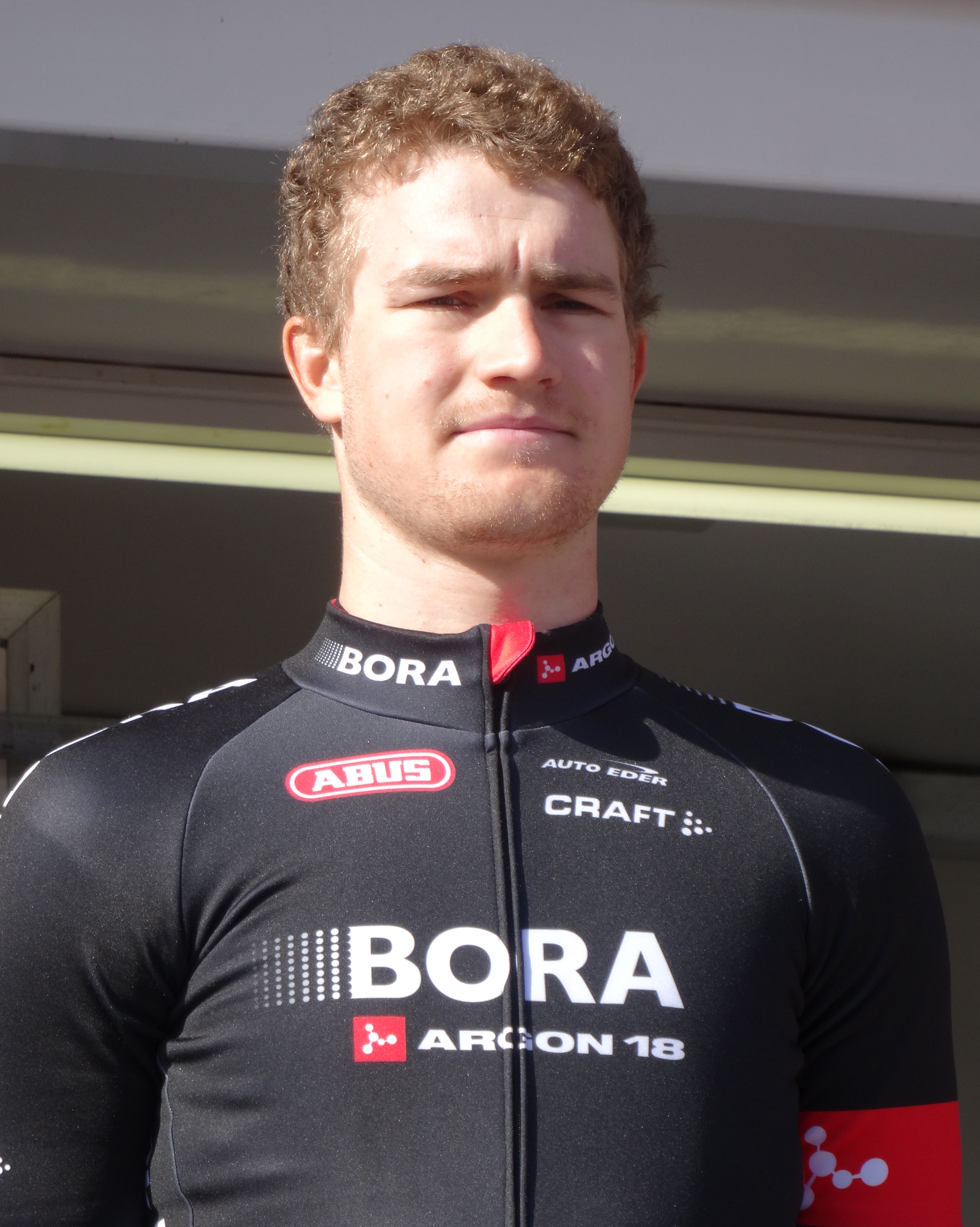
- Thwaites at the 2015 Le Samyn

Personal information
- Full name: Scott Christopher Thwaites
- Born: 12 February 1990 (age 36) Burley in Wharfedale
- Height: 178 cm (5 ft 10 in)
- Weight: 69 kg (152 lb)

Cycling career
- Sport: Cycling
- Current team: Alpecin–Premier Tech
- Disciplines: Road; Cyclo-cross
- Role: Rider
- Rider type: Classics specialist

Professional teams
- 2010–2012: Endura Racing
- 2013–2016: NetApp–Endura
- 2017–2018: Team Dimension Data
- 2019: Vitus Pro Cycling Team p/b Brother UK
- 2020–: Alpecin–Deceuninck
Medal record
Commonwealth Games
Bronze medal – third place	2014 Glasgow	Road race

Scott Christopher Thwaites (born 12 February 1990) is a British cyclist, who currently rides for UCI ProTeam Alpecin–Premier Tech. He represented England in the 2014 Commonwealth Games road race and won the bronze medal.

== Career ==
Thwaites was born in Burley in Wharfedale.

=== NetApp–Endura (2013–16) ===
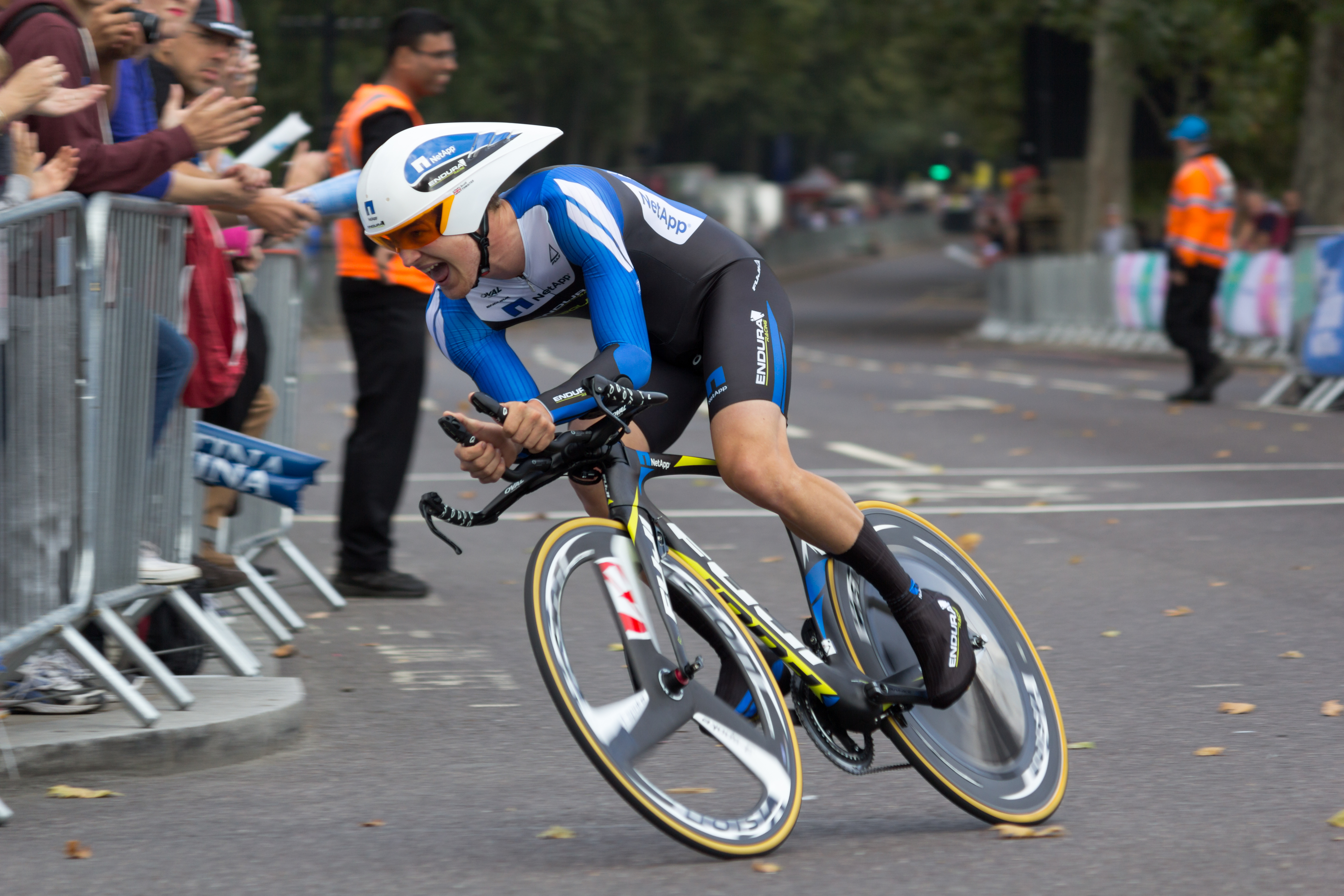
Thwaites at the 2014 Tour of Britain

He was named in the startlist for the 2016 Vuelta a España.

=== Team Dimension Data (2017–18) ===
In September 2016 Team Dimension Data confirmed that Thwaites would join them for 2017. In his first season with the team, he took a top 10 finish in Strade Bianche, and in June 2017, he was named in the startlist for the 2017 Tour de France, completing the race in 107th place. However, his 2018 season was disrupted by sustaining serious injuries in a training crash, and he left the team at the end of the year.

=== Vitus Pro Cycling (2019) ===
Thwaites joined the Vitus Pro Cycling Team p/b Brother UK for 2019. In 2019 he took top ten finishes in the European Games and the Tour de Yorkshire.

=== Alpecin–Fenix ===
In December 2019 it was reported that Thwaites would join Corendon–Circus, later renamed Alpecin–Fenix, on an initial one-year contract for 2020.

== Major results ==
2005
3rd Road race, National Junior Road Championships
2006
2nd Road race, National Junior Road Championships
2007
2nd Road race, National Junior Road Championships
2nd National Junior CX Championships
2009
1st National Under-23 XC MTB Championships
2010
6th Overall Tour of the Reservoir
2011
1st Road race, National Under-23 Road Championships
1st Otley Criterium
1st Lincoln Grand Prix
1st Stoke-on-Trent, Tour Series
2012
1st National Criterium Championships
1st Overall Premier Calendar
1st Overall Tour of the Reservoir
Tour Series

1st Kirkcaldy
1st Oxford

3rd Overall Tour Doon Hame

1st Stage 2

5th Grand Prix de la Ville de Lillers
2013
5th Handzame Classic
7th Le Samyn
8th Philadelphia International Championship
2014
2nd Ronde van Drenthe
3rd Road race, Commonwealth Games
6th Nokere Koerse
2015
3rd Nokere Koerse
5th Road race, National Road Championships
5th Ronde van Drenthe
5th Dwars door Drenthe
2016
2nd Le Samyn
5th Road race, National Road Championships
7th Trofeo Pollenca-Port de Andratx
8th Dwars door Vlaanderen
10th Kuurne–Brussels–Kuurne
2017
10th Strade Bianche
2019
7th Road race, European Games
8th Overall Tour de Yorkshire
10th Rutland–Melton CiCLE Classic

=== Grand Tour general classification results timeline ===
Grand Tour	2016	2017	2018	2019	2020	2021
Giro d'Italia	—	—	—	—	—	—
Tour de France	—	107	—	—	—	—
Vuelta a España	116	—	—	—	—	134

Legend
—	Did not compete
DNF	Did not finish
