= Caleb Ewan =

Australian road and track cyclist

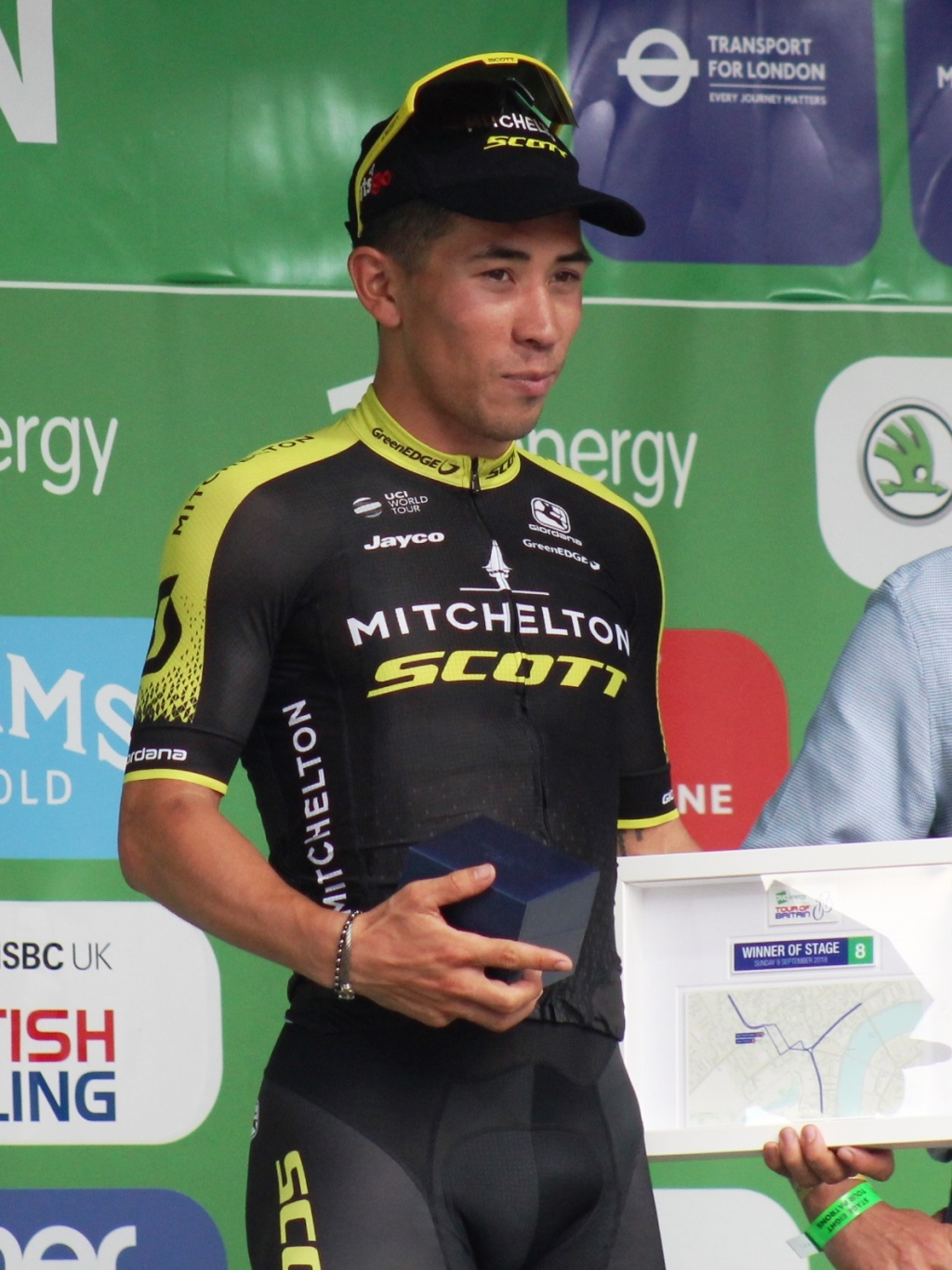
- Ewan at the 2018 Tour of Britain

Personal information
- Full name: Caleb Ewan
- Nickname: The Pocket Rocket
- Born: 11 July 1994 (age 32) Sydney, Australia
- Height: 1.67 m (5 ft 5 1/2 in)
- Weight: 69 kg (152 lb; 10 st 12 lb)

Cycling career
- Sport: Cycling
- Disciplines: Road; Track
- Role: Rider
- Rider type: Sprinter

Amateur teams
- 2013–2014: Jayco–AIS World Tour Academy
- 2014: Orica–GreenEDGE (stagiaire)

Professional teams
- 2014–2018: Orica–GreenEDGE
- 2019–2023: Lotto–Soudal
- 2024: Team Jayco–AlUla
- 2025: INEOS Grenadiers

Major wins
- Grand Tours Tour de France 5 individual stages (2019, 2020) Giro d'Italia 5 individual stages (2017, 2019, 2021) Vuelta a España 1 individual stage (2015) One-day races and Classics EuroEyes Cyclassics (2016) Clásica de Almería (2018) Brussels Cycling Classic (2019) Scheldeprijs (2020) GP de Fourmies (2022)
Medal record
Representing Australia
Men's road bicycle racing
World Championships
| Silver medal – second place | 2012 Valkenburg | Junior road race |
| Silver medal – second place | 2014 Ponferrada | Under-23 road race |

Caleb Ewan (born 11 July 1994) is an Australian former professional road and track cyclist. A sprinter, Ewan has a style similar to that of Mark Cavendish, taking an extremely low position that offers him an aerodynamic advantage.

== Career ==
=== Youth ===
Caleb Ewan was born in New South Wales to a Korean mother and Peruvian father. At the age of eight he started bicycle racing, inspired by his father, who was also a competitive cyclist. He started competitive cycling at the age of ten. In 2010 he became the Junior National Road Race Champion. The next year he won multiple disciplines at the Junior National Track Championships and he became World Champion omnium at the Junior Track World Championships.

=== Professional career ===
In 2013 Ewan started racing for Jayco–AIS World Tour Academy. That year he won the first stage as well as the general classification of the Mitchelton Wines Bay Cycling Classic. He also won the La Côte Picarde installment of the UCI Nations Cup U23, the Gran Premio Palio del Recioto, and stages in the Tour Alsace, Thüringen Rundfahrt der U23 and the Tour de l'Avenir. At the end of the year he finished fourth in the Men's under-23 road race at the 2013 UCI Road World Championships.

Ewan signed pre-contract terms with Orica–GreenEDGE in October 2013, joining the World Tour team as a stagiaire in August 2014 and as a professional in October. At the beginning of August, before joining Orica–GreenEDGE, Ewan took part in the road race at the 2014 Commonwealth Games, competing for Australia. The Australian team tried to control the race for Ewan's sprint, but were unable to do so. After attempting a solo chase of the three leaders, he fell back and was the last man to finish: he finished in 12th place out of 140 who started, over 11 minutes behind the gold medallist Geraint Thomas (Wales).

His first professional wins came in the second and third stages of the 2015 Herald Sun Tour. A month later, in the Tour de Langkawi he then took his second professional win and the lead in general classification. Though he lost the overall lead of the race, Ewan won a second stage (the third victory of his career) and the points classification. He was named in the start list for the 2015 Vuelta a España, where he won stage 5, but he withdrew from the race during stage 10.

In 2016, Ewan participated in the Tour Down Under and won the first stage in a mass sprint. He made it a duo of wins by taking the sixth stage as well. He also was the victor of Stage 2 of the Herald Sun Tour, another race held on Australian soil. He was named in the start list for the 2016 Giro d'Italia. He raced in the 2017 Giro, winning stage seven in a field sprint.

For the 2019 season, Ewan signed with Lotto–Soudal. He started the year at the Tour Down Under, where he headbutted Jasper Philipsen in Stage 5 and was relegated to 83rd place after crossing the finish line first. In July 2019, he participated in the Tour de France, and in Stage 11 he beat Dylan Groenewegen in a tight sprint finish in Toulouse. He won stage 16 in Nîmes, narrowly beating Elia Viviani, as well as the final stage, crossing the line ahead of Groenewegen on the Champs-Élysées.

At the Tour de France, he won two more stages, on days three and eleven. That year, he totaled seven wins. The following season, he won stages three and seven of the Giro d'Italia, tallying six total victories for the year.

In 2022, he again took seven wins, including the Grand Prix de Fourmies one-day race. He was the "lanterne rouge" of the 2022 Tour de France, having finished over 5 hours down on overall winner Jonas Vingegaard. He only won one race in 2023: the Van Merksteijn Fences Classic.

After five seasons with Lotto–Dstny, Ewan left the team due to disagreements with the new team manager Stéphane Heulot. He then joined UCI WorldTeam Team Jayco–AlUla on a two-year contract. His first success with the squad was the opening stage of the 2024 Tour of Oman.

At the beginning of the 2025 season, Ewan sought an early release of his contract. Negotiations with UCI WorldTeam XDS Astana Team collapsed, prompting his move to INEOS Grenadiers.

On 6 May 2025, he announced his retirement from professional cycling.

== Major results ==
=== Road ===
2010
1st Road race, National Junior Championships
2011
3rd Time trial, National Junior Championships
2012
National Junior Championships

1st Time trial
2nd Road race

1st Gent–Menen
1st Stage 4 Regio-Tour Juniors
1st Stage 2b Liège–La Gleize
2nd Road race, UCI World Junior Championships
2nd Trofeo Comune di Vertova
2nd Trofeo Emilio Paganessi
3rd Overall Keizer der Juniores
2013
1st Gran Premio Palio del Recioto
1st La Côte Picarde
Thüringen Rundfahrt der U23

1st Points classification
1st Stages 4 & 7

Tour de l'Avenir

1st Stages 1 & 2

1st Stage 2 Tour Alsace
3rd Gran Premio Industrie del Marmo
4th Road race, UCI World Under-23 Championships
8th Trofeo Piva
2014
1st Road race, National Under-23 Championships
1st Stage 2 Tour de l'Avenir
2nd Road race, UCI World Under-23 Championships
2nd Trofeo Città di San Vendemiano
6th Trofeo Piva
2015 (11 pro wins)
1st Overall Tour de Korea

1st Points classification
1st Young rider classification
1st Stages 2, 3, 5 & 7

1st Vuelta a La Rioja
Tour de Langkawi

1st Points classification
1st Stages 3 & 6

Herald Sun Tour

1st Stages 2 & 3

1st Stage 5 Vuelta a España
2nd Road race, National Championships
2016 (5)
1st EuroEyes Cyclassics
Tour Down Under

1st Stages 1 & 6

1st Stage 8 Tour of Britain
1st Stage 2 Herald Sun Tour
2017 (10)
Tour Down Under

1st Sprints classification
1st Stages 1, 3, 4 & 6

Tour of Britain

1st Stages 1, 3 & 6

1st Points classification, Tour de Yorkshire
1st Stage 7 Giro d'Italia
1st Stage 4 Tour de Pologne
1st Stage 4 Abu Dhabi Tour
10th Milan–San Remo
2018 (3)
1st Clásica de Almería
1st Stage 2 Tour Down Under
1st Stage 8 Tour of Britain
2nd Milan–San Remo
4th Road race, National Championships
2019 (10)
1st Brussels Cycling Classic
Tour de France

1st Stages 11, 16 & 21
Held after Stage 1

Giro d'Italia

1st Stages 8 & 11

Tour of Turkey

1st Stages 4 & 6

1st Stage 4 UAE Tour
1st Stage 4 ZLM Tour
2nd Cadel Evans Great Ocean Road Race
2nd EuroEyes Cyclassics
2020 (7)
1st Scheldeprijs
Tour de France

1st Stages 3 & 11

Tour Down Under

1st Stages 2 & 4

UAE Tour

1st Points classification
1st Stage 2

1st Stage 1 Tour de Wallonie
2nd Milano–Torino
7th Cadel Evans Great Ocean Road Race
2021 (6)
Giro d'Italia

1st Stages 5 & 7
Held after Stage 7

Tour of Belgium

1st Points classification
1st Stages 3 & 4

1st Stage 5 Benelux Tour
1st Stage 7 UAE Tour
2nd Milan–San Remo
2022 (7)
1st Grand Prix de Fourmies
Tour of Turkey

1st Stages 1 & 6

1st Stage 3 Tirreno–Adriatico
1st Stage 1 Tour des Alpes-Maritimes et du Var
1st Stage 1 Saudi Tour
1st Stage 1 Deutschland Tour
2nd Kuurne–Brussels–Kuurne
2nd Elfstedenronde
2nd Kampioenschap van Vlaanderen
2023 (1)
1st Van Merksteijn Fences Classic
2nd Grote Prijs Jean-Pierre Monseré
2nd Ronde van Limburg
2nd Elfstedenronde
6th Cadel Evans Great Ocean Road Race
7th Scheldeprijs
2024 (3)
1st Vuelta a Castilla y León
1st Stage 1 Tour of Oman
1st Stage 2 Vuelta a Burgos
2025 (2)
1st Stage 2 Tour of the Basque Country
1st Stage 1 Settimana Internazionale di Coppi e Bartali

=== Grand Tour general classification results timeline ===
| Grand Tour | 2015 | 2016 | 2017 | 2018 | 2019 | 2020 | 2021 | 2022 | 2023 | 2024 |
|---|---|---|---|---|---|---|---|---|---|---|
| Giro d'Italia | — | DNF | DNF | — | DNF | — | DNF | DNF | — | 120 |
| Tour de France | — | — | — | — | 132 | 144 | DNF | 134 | DNF | — |
| Vuelta a España | DNF | — | — | — | — | — | — | — | — | — |

=== Classic results timeline ===
| Monument | 2016 | 2017 | 2018 | 2019 | 2020 | 2021 | 2022 | 2023 |
|---|---|---|---|---|---|---|---|---|
| Milan–San Remo | — | 10 | 2 | 29 | 113 | 2 | — | 16 |
| Tour of Flanders | — | — | — | — | — | — | — | DNF |
| Paris–Roubaix | Has not contested during his career | | | | | | | |
| Liège–Bastogne–Liège | Has not contested during his career | | | | | | | |
| Giro di Lombardia | Has not contested during his career | | | | | | | |
| Classic | 2016 | 2017 | 2018 | 2019 | 2020 | 2021 | 2022 | 2023 |
| Kuurne–Brussels–Kuurne | 15 | — | — | — | — | — | 2 | — |
| Gent–Wevelgem | — | 101 | — | — | DNF | — | — | 66 |
| Scheldeprijs | — | — | — | — | 1 | — | — | 7 |
| Hamburg Cyclassics | 1 | 34 | — | 2 | Not held | | 88 | — |
| Brussels Cycling Classic | — | — | — | 1 | — | — | — | — |
| Milano–Torino | — | — | — | — | 2 | — | — | — |
| Paris–Tours | 178 | — | — | — | — | — | — | — |

Legend
| — | Did not compete |
| DNF | Did not finish |
| IP | In progress |
| NH | Not held |

==== Critériums ====
2012
2nd Overall Mitchelton Wines Bay Classic

1st Stages 2 & 4

2013
1st Overall Mitchelton Wines Bay Classic

1st Stage 1

2014
3rd Overall Mitchelton Wines Bay Classic

1st Stage 4

3rd Down Under Classic
2015
1st Overall Mitchelton Wines Bay Classic

1st Stages 1, 2 & 3

2nd National Championships
2016
1st National Championships
1st Overall Mitchelton Wines Bay Classic

1st Stages 1, 2 & 4

1st Down Under Classic
2017
1st National Championships
1st Down Under Classic
3rd Overall Mitchelton Wines Bay Classic

1st Stage 3

2018
1st National Championships
3rd Down Under Classic
2019
1st Down Under Classic
2nd Overall Bay Classic Series

1st Stages 2 & 3

2020
1st Down Under Classic
2023
1st Down Under Classic
2024
1st National Championships

=== Track ===
2011
1st Omnium, UCI World Junior Championships
National Junior Championships

1st Omnium
1st Points race
1st Madison
2nd Team pursuit
3rd Scratch

2012
2nd Individual pursuit, Oceania Championships
National Junior Championships

2nd Madison
2nd Points race
3rd Scratch
3rd Team pursuit

2013
2nd Team pursuit, National Championships
