= 2020 Scheldeprijs =

2020 UCI Europe Tour 2020 UCI ProSeries
- Event poster with previous winner Fabio Jakobsen

Race details
- Dates: 14 October 2020
- Stages: 1
- Distance: 174 km (108 mi)
- Winning time: 3h 34' 38"

Results
	Winner	Caleb Ewan (AUS)	(Lotto–Soudal)
	Second	Niccolò Bonifazio (ITA)	(Total Direct Énergie)
	Third	Bryan Coquard (FRA)	(B&B Hotels–Vital Concept)

The 2020 Scheldeprijs was the 108th edition of the Scheldeprijs road cycling one day race. It was originally scheduled to be held on 8 April 2020, but due to the COVID-19 pandemic, it was postponed to 14 October 2020. It was a 1.Pro event on the 2020 UCI Europe Tour and the 2020 UCI ProSeries.

In previous years, the race course has included sections in both Belgium and the Netherlands, and was originally planned to start in the Dutch city of Terneuzen and finish in the Belgian city of Schoten. However, due to a spike in COVID-19 cases in the Netherlands, the race course was altered to 10 laps of a 17.4 km (10.8 mi) course in and around Schoten.

Australian rider Caleb Ewan of Lotto–Soudal won the sprint comfortably by a margin of a few bike lengths ahead of the rest of the field. After the race, the original runner-up, Pascal Ackermann of Bora–Hansgrohe, was relegated because he deviated from his line when he began to launch his sprint. In doing so, Ackermann cut across the front wheel of August Jensen of Riwal Securitas, causing the latter to fall heavily. Several other riders, including Pierre Barbier of Nippo–Delko–One Provence and Iván García of Bahrain–McLaren, also crashed in the chain reaction. As a result of Ackermann's relegation, Niccolò Bonifazio and Bryan Coquard were promoted to second and third place, respectively.

== Teams ==
Fifteen of the nineteen UCI WorldTeams, nine UCI ProTeams, and one UCI Continental team made up the twenty-five teams that participated in the race. Each team was allowed to enter up to seven riders; the only teams not to do so were Circus–Wanty Gobert and INEOS Grenadiers with six each, and Cofidis with five. Of the 170 riders in the race, only 12 did not finish.

UCI WorldTeams

- Astana
- Bahrain–McLaren
- Bora–Hansgrohe
- CCC Team
- Cofidis
- Deceuninck–Quick-Step
- Groupama–FDJ
- INEOS Grenadiers
- Israel Start-Up Nation
- Lotto–Soudal
- Mitchelton–Scott
- NTT Pro Cycling
- Team Sunweb
- Trek–Segafredo
- UAE Team Emirates

UCI ProTeams

- Alpecin–Fenix
- Arkéa–Samsic
- B&B Hotels–Vital Concept
- Bingoal–Wallonie Bruxelles
- Circus–Wanty Gobert
- Nippo–Delko–One Provence
- Riwal Securitas
- Sport Vlaanderen–Baloise
- Total Direct Énergie

UCI Continental Teams

- Tarteletto–Isorex

== Result ==
Result
Rank	Rider	Team	Time
1	Caleb Ewan (AUS)	Lotto–Soudal	3h 34' 38"
2	Niccolò Bonifazio (ITA)	Total Direct Énergie	+ 0"
3	Bryan Coquard (FRA)	B&B Hotels–Vital Concept	+ 0"
4	Tim Merlier (BEL)	Alpecin–Fenix	+ 0"
5	Jasper Philipsen (BEL)	UAE Team Emirates	+ 0"
6	Amaury Capiot (BEL)	Sport Vlaanderen–Baloise	+ 0"
7	Arvid de Kleijn (NED)	Riwal Securitas	+ 0"
8	Sam Bennett (IRL)	Deceuninck–Quick-Step	+ 0"
9	Itamar Einhorn (ISR)	Israel Start-Up Nation	+ 0"
10	Romain Cardis (FRA)	Total Direct Énergie	+ 0"
