= Emerson Oronte =

American cyclist (born 1990)

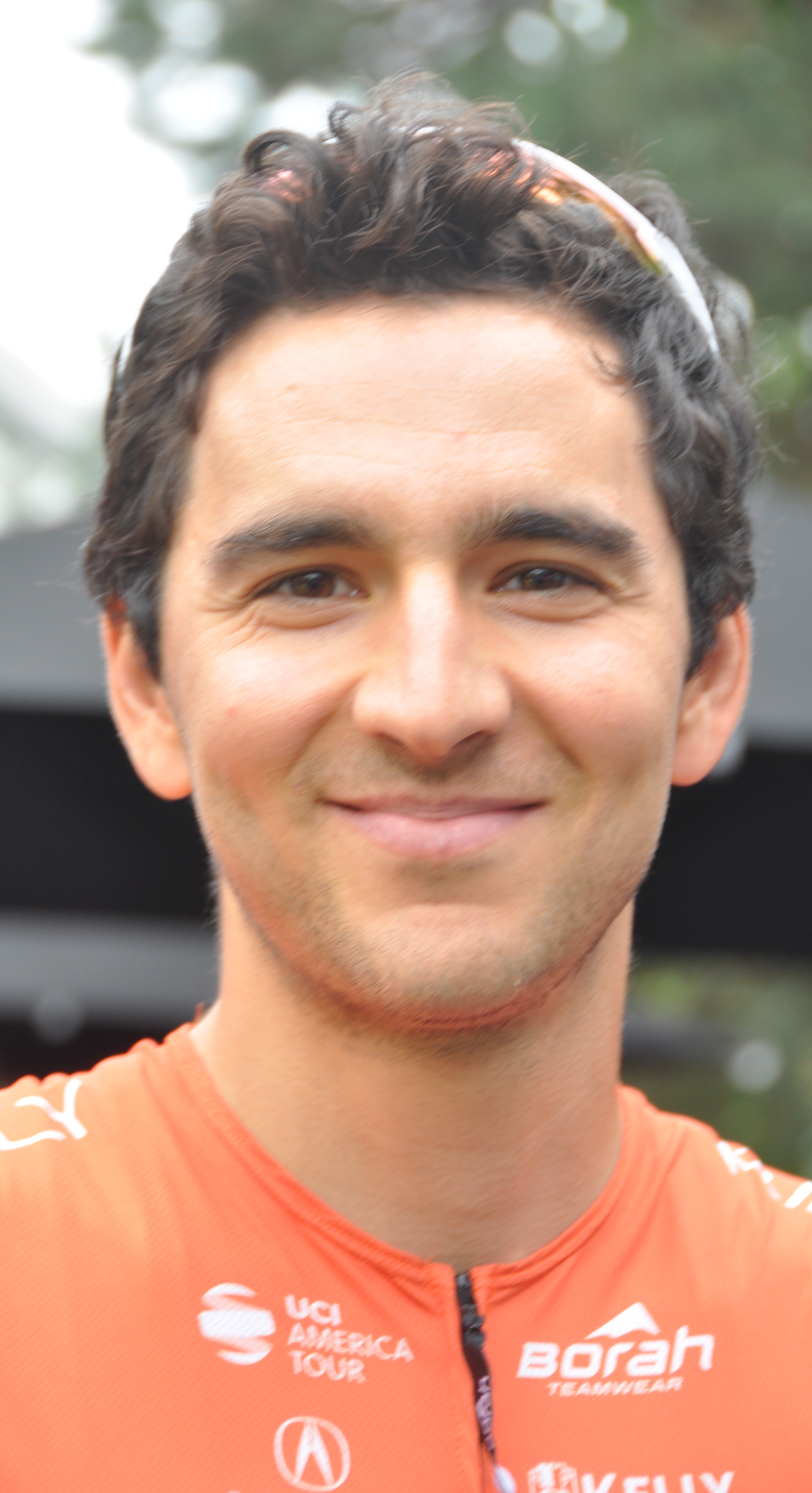
- Oronte at the 2018 Deutschland Tour

Personal information
- Full name: Emerson Oronte
- Born: January 29, 1990 (age 36) Cohasset, Massachusetts
- Height: 5 ft 9 in (1.75 m)
- Weight: 143 lb (65 kg)

Cycling career
- Sport: Cycling
- Current team: Retired
- Discipline: Road
- Role: Rider

Amateur team
- 2014: Horizon Organic–Einstein Bros. Cycling

Professional teams
- 2011–2013: Jelly Belly–Kenda
- 2014: Optum–Kelly Benefit Strategies
- 2015: Team SmartStop
- 2016–2021: Rally Cycling

Emerson Oronte (born January 29, 1990) is an American former cyclist, who competed as a professional from 2011 to 2021.

== Career ==
Oronte turned professional with Jelly Belly–Kenda in 2011. Oronte worked as a domestique while on the team before leaving at the end of the 2013 season. In 2014, Oronte raced with the now defunct Horizon Organic Elite Cycling team. He scored several big results, finishing 4th overall at the Joe Martin Stage Race and going on to win the Amateur Road Nationals later that year. These results scored him a ride with Optum–Kelly Benefit Strategies for the remainder of the season. Going into 2015, Oronte found himself again without a professional contract, despite his results. However, after winning the San Dimas Stage Race that year, finishing 8th overall at the Redlands Bicycle Classic, and finishing 6th on the Gila Monster stage at the Tour of the Gila, Oronte once again proved his mettle and earned a contract with Team SmartStop. Team SmartStop folded at the end of the 2015 season, but Oronte got a contract with Rally Cycling. At Rally, Oronte has proven himself a reliable domestique in the mountains, as well as a good all-round racer when he gets his own chances. Oronte has shown consistency in many types of races all across the globe and continues to be a valuable asset to Rally Cycling.

== Personal life ==
Oronte lives and trains just outside of Boulder, Colorado. He is married to former Division 1 cyclist, Kristen Metherd.

== Major results ==
2015
1st Overall San Dimas Stage Race

1st Stage 1

2nd Mount Evans Hill Climb
10th Overall Tour of the Gila
2017
3rd Overall Redlands Bicycle Classic
9th Winston Salem Cycling Classic
