= Gary Verity =

British businessman

Sir Gary Verity DL
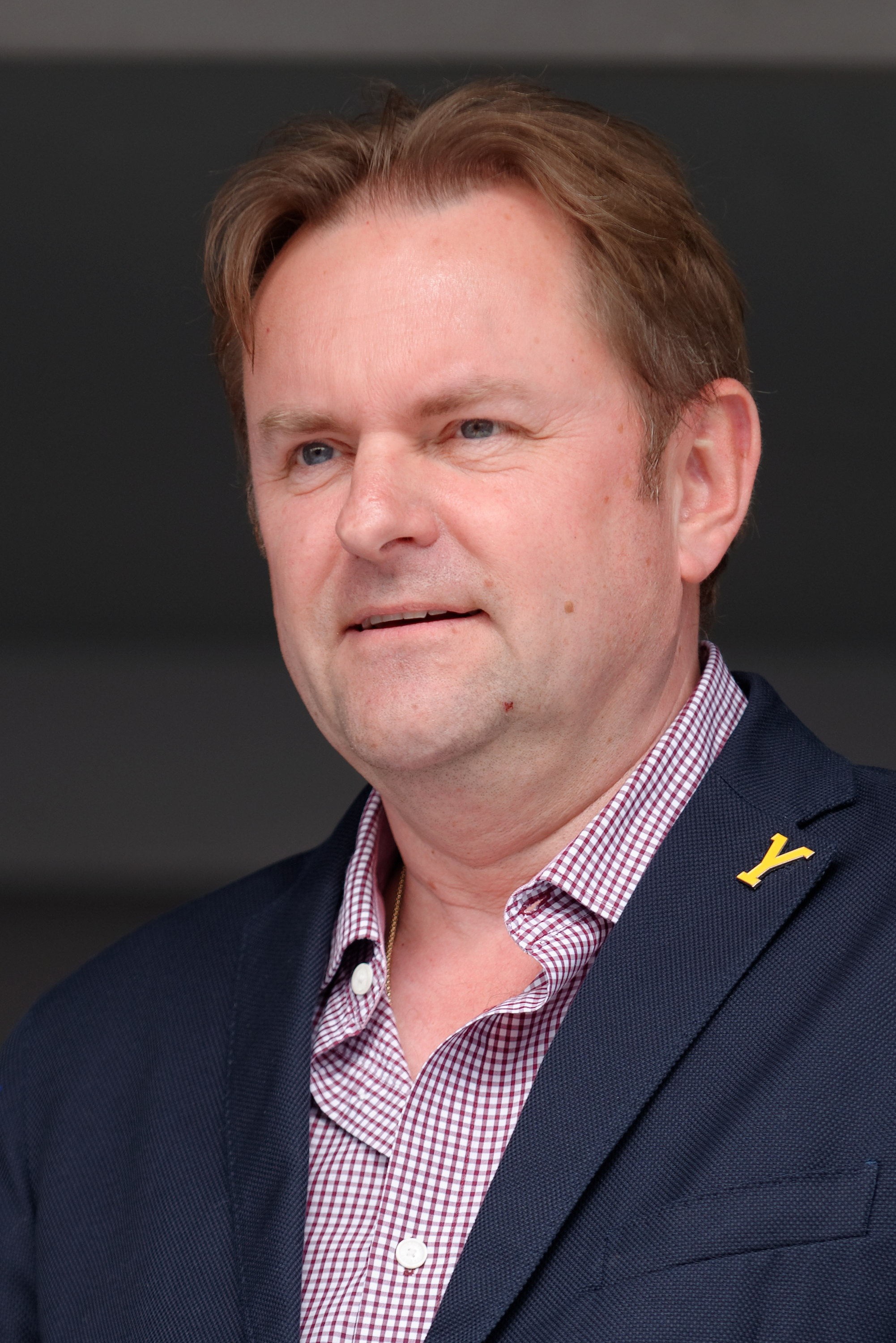
- Verity in 2014

Chief Executive Officer of Welcome to Yorkshire
- In office October 2008 – March 2019

Personal details
- Born: Gary Keith Verity; July 1964 (age 62) Leeds, West Riding of Yorkshire, England
- Awards: Knight Bachelor (2015); National Order of Merit, France (2017)

Sir Gary Keith Verity, DL (born July 1964) is a British businessman and sheep farmer. He was Chief Executive of Welcome to Yorkshire from 2008 until he resigned in March 2019.

== Welcome to Yorkshire ==
From October 2008 to March 2019, Verity was Chief Executive of Welcome to Yorkshire. He led the successful campaign for the Grand Départ of the 2014 Tour de France to be held in Yorkshire.

On 22 March 2019, Verity resigned from his post with Welcome To Yorkshire citing health reasons. He also admitted that he had "made errors of judgement regarding his expenses". He voluntarily offered to repay the incorrectly claimed expenses. He was also accused of unacceptable behaviour and bullying, with the former head of communications Dee Marshall suggesting that he had "really hurt people". Allegations were made concerning his behaviour in 2014 and 2016: he was issued with a final written warning and required to attend "behavioural management counselling".

== Honours ==
In July 2014, Verity was awarded an honorary doctorate by the University of York. In the 2015 Queen's Birthday Honours, it was announced that he had been appointed a Knight Bachelor "for services to Tourism and the Tour De France Grand Depart 2014". In April 2017, he was made a Chevalier (knight) of the National Order of Merit by the President of France in recognition of his role in bringing the Grand Départ of the Tour de France to Yorkshire in 2014 and for creating its spiritual successor, the Tour de Yorkshire.

In May 2018, Verity was made a Deputy Lieutenant (DL) to the Lord Lieutenant of West Yorkshire.

In January 2022, it was reported that the Government’s Forfeiture Committee is considering stripping Verity of his knighthood.

== Personal life ==
Verity was born and raised in Leeds, and attended Leeds Grammar School. An affinity with the Yorkshire Dales led him to buying a sheep farm in Coverdale. He has an 18 year old daughter, Lily (born 2003) with his late wife, Helen.
