= Matthew Holmes (cyclist) =

British cyclist

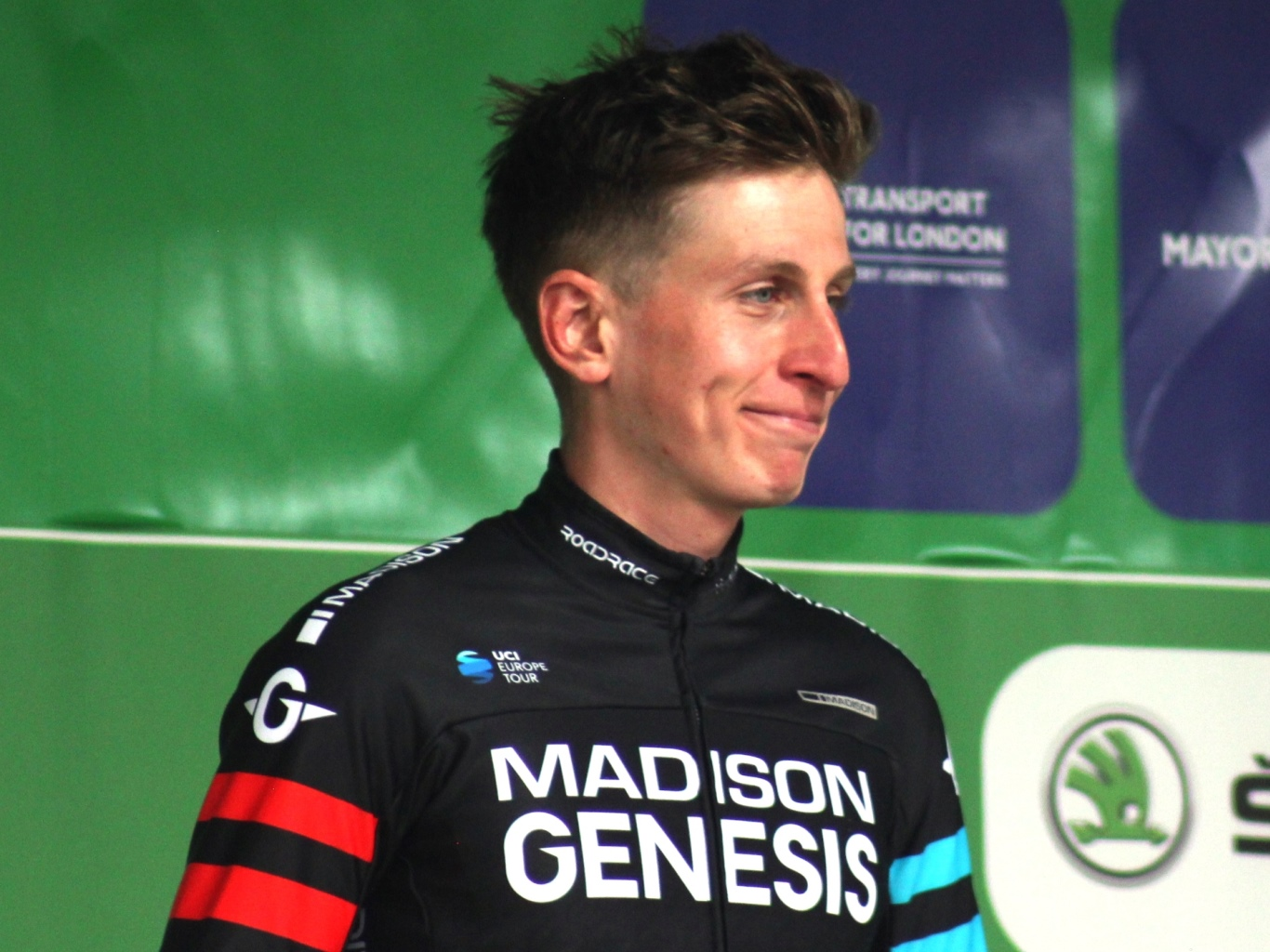
- Holmes at the 2018 Tour of Britain

Personal information
- Full name: Matthew Holmes
- Born: 8 December 1993 (age 32) Wigan, England
- Height: 1.78 m (5 ft 10 in)
- Weight: 67 kg (148 lb)

Cycling career
- Sport: Cycling
- Disciplines: Road; Gravel
- Role: Rider
- Rider type: Puncheur

Professional teams
- 2012–2013: Team Raleigh–GAC
- 2014–2019: Madison Genesis
- 2020–2022: Lotto–Soudal

Matthew Holmes (born 8 December 1993) is a British cyclist, who competed as a professional from 2012 to 2022. He now competes as an unattached rider in national-level and gravel races. In October 2020, he was named in the startlist for the 2020 Giro d'Italia.

== Major results ==
2011
2nd Overall Junior Tour of Wales

1st Mountains classification

2012
2nd Road race, National Under–23 Road Championships
2016
1st Overall Totnes–Vire
7th Overall An Post Ras
9th Beaumont Trophy
2017
3rd Lincoln Grand Prix
5th Overall Tour de Yorkshire
2018
2nd GP Lucien Van Impe
2019
2nd Overall Tour of the Reservoir
4th Tokyo 2020 Test Event
6th Overall Tour de Yorkshire
2020
1st Stage 6 Tour Down Under
2024
1st Lincoln Grand Prix
1st The Gralloch, UCI Gravel World Series
2025
UCI Gravel World Series

1st 114 Gravel Race
2nd The Gralloch

=== Grand Tour general classification results timeline ===
Grand Tour	2020	2021	2022
Giro d'Italia	81	—	116
Tour de France	—	—	—
Vuelta a España	—	DNF	—

Legend
—	Did not compete
DNF	Did not finish
