= Welcome to Yorkshire =

British tourism agency

Welcome to Yorkshire's official logo

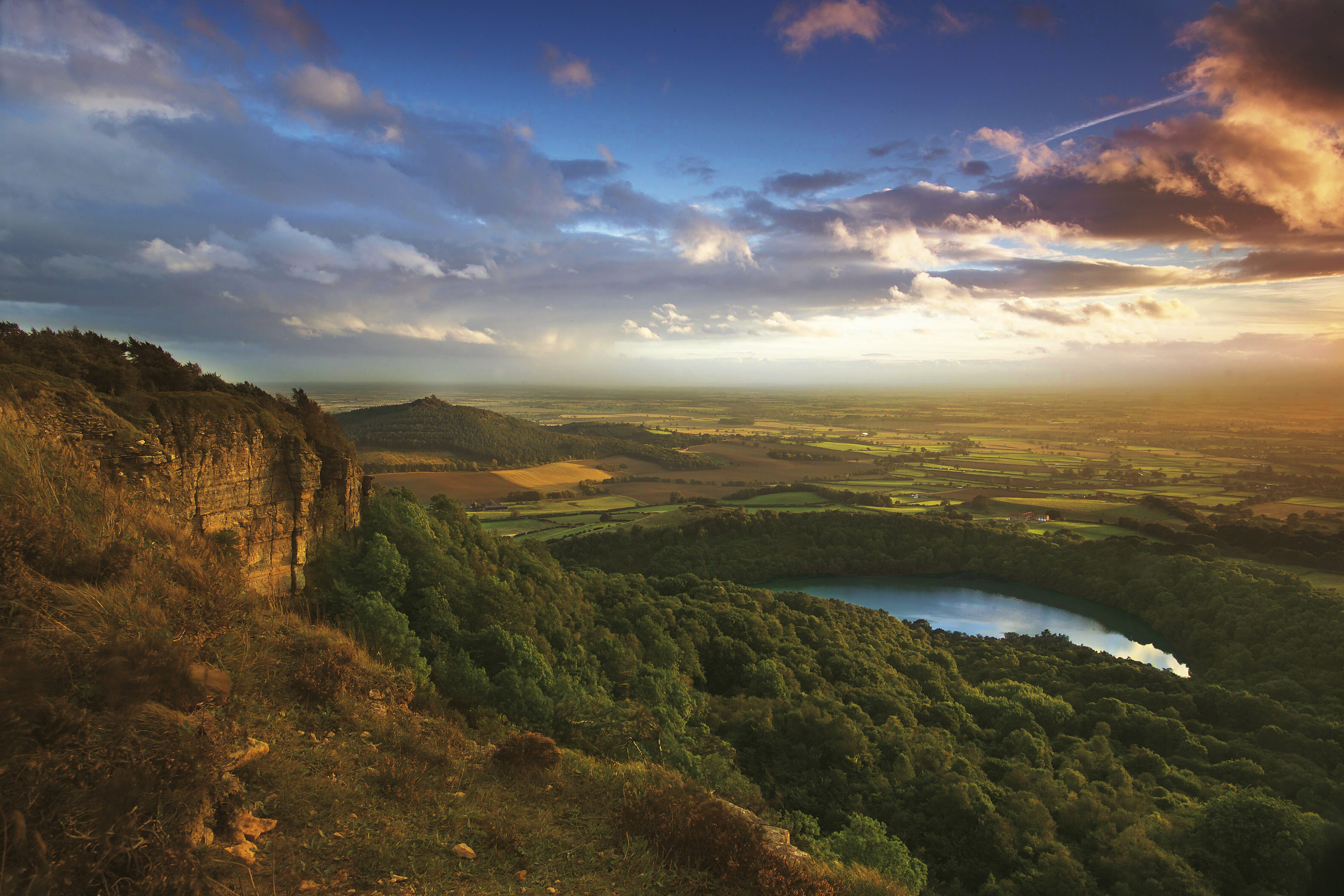
Sutton Bank, North York Moors National Park

Welcome to Yorkshire (WTY) was the official tourism agency for the traditional county of Yorkshire, the largest county in the United Kingdom, promoting Yorkshire tourism both nationally and internationally, until 2022. It was formerly known as the Yorkshire Tourist Board until 2009, but underwent a rebranding, and a move to offices in Leeds, West Yorkshire. The stated aim of the organisation was: 'to grow the county's visitor economy'. The Chief Executive from 2008 until his resignation in March 2019 was Sir Gary Verity. The next Chief Executive, James Mason, was appointed in 2019 having previously worked as chief operating officer of Bradford City Football Club and a journalist for the BBC.

James Mason left Welcome to Yorkshire in 2021 following an investigation, and on 1 March 2022, the business entered administration, before having its assets – including the Welcome to Yorkshire name and trademarks, sold to be run by another organisation in future. The business was carrying significant debts at the time of its demise, largely to a local pension fund.

== Activities ==
Aside from the more traditional forms of tourism marketing usually associated with tourist boards, Welcome to Yorkshire has been involved in cultural partnerships such as the Yorkshire entries to the Chelsea Flower Show, The Railway Children tour, the Hockney tour and the Yorkshire Sculpture Triangle. They are also an official partner of Yorkshire County Cricket Club, sponsoring the team's Twenty20 tour of South Africa in 2012.

Welcome to Yorkshire ran the campaign to host the 2014 Grand Depart of the Tour de France in the county. On 14 December 2012 Yorkshire was confirmed as the starting place for the race.

== Expenses scandal ==
In 2019, it was found that an expenses scandal following the resignation of chief executive Sir Gary Verity led to further costs for the organisation of nearly £500,000 with forensic accounting company BDO unable to determine if £900,000 of expenses were justified due to a lack of clear policies for expenses. Verity repaid over £40,000 and a subsequent police investigation concluded with no action being taken.

== Administration and liquidation ==
After the COVID-19 pandemic, and following the expenses scandal, the Welcome to Yorkshire business endured a period of financial difficulty, before entering administration on 1 March 2022. On 11 April 2022, a deal was concluded to sell the business name, websites, domains and some rights to the Tour de Yorkshire to a business called Silicon Dales Ltd who would continue to run the online operations, and committed publicly to trying to save the Tour de Yorkshire cycling race in future years.

The Welcome to Yorkshire Ltd business was therefore liquidated by administrators, Armstrong Watson. Public records showed that, at the time of its demise, Welcome to Yorkshire Ltd owed a North Yorkshire pension fund over £1.4 million, raising questions from the local media – particularly the Yorkshire Post – over whether the administration should have happened much earlier.
