= List of 2017 UCI WorldTeams and riders =

This page is a list of 2017 UCI WorldTeams and riders. These teams are competing in the 2017 UCI World Tour.

== Teams overview ==
The 18 WorldTeams in 2017 are:

2017 UCI World Teams and equipment
Code	Official Team Name	Country	Groupset	Road Bike(s)	Time Trial Bike	Wheels
ALM	AG2R La Mondiale (2017 season)	France	Shimano	Factor Bikes 02; Factor Bikes ONE; Factor Bikes ONE–S	Factor Bikes Slick	Mavic
AST	Astana (2017 season)	Kazakhstan	Shimano / FSA	Argon 18 Gallium Pro; Argon 18 Nitrogen Pro	E-118 Next	Vision Wheels
TBM	Bahrain–Merida (2017 season)	Bahrain	Shimano	Merida Scultura; Merida Reacto	Merida Warp	Fulcrum
BMC	BMC Racing Team (2017 season)	United States	Shimano	BMC Teammachine SLR01; BMC Timemachine TMR01; BMC Granfondo GF01	BMC TimeMachine TM01	Shimano
BOH	Bora–Hansgrohe (2017 season)	Germany	TBC	Specialized Venge; S-Works Tarmac; Specialized Roubaix	Specialized Shiv	Roval
CDT	Cannondale–Drapac (2017 season)	United States	Shimano	Cannondale SuperSix EVO; Cannondale Synapse	Cannondale Slice	Mavic
DDD	Team Dimension Data (2017 season)	South Africa	Shimano/Rotor	Cervélo S5; Cervélo R5; Cervélo C5	Cervélo P5	Enve
FDJ	FDJ (2017 season)	France	Shimano	Lapierre Xelius SL; Lapierre Aircode SL; Lapierre Pulsium	Lapierre Aerostorm DRS	Shimano
KAT	Team Katusha–Alpecin (2017 season)	Switzerland	SRAM	Canyon Ultimate CF SLX; Canyon Aeroad CF SLX; Canyon Endurance CF SL	Canyon Speedmax CF	Zipp
TLJ	LottoNL–Jumbo (2017 season)	Netherlands	Shimano	Bianchi OltreXR2; Bianchi Specialissima; Bianchi Infinito CV	Bianchi Aquila CV	Shimano
LTS	Lotto–Soudal (2017 season)	Belgium	Campagnolo	Ridley Helium SLX; Ridley Noah SL; Ridley Fenix SL	Ridley Dean Fast	Campagnolo
MOV	Movistar Team (2017 season)	Spain	Campagnolo	Canyon Ultimate CF SLX; Canyon Aeroad CF SLX	Canyon Speedmax CF	Campagnolo
ORS	Orica–Scott (2017 season)	Australia	Shimano	Scott Foil; Scott Addict	Scott Plasma	Shimano
QST	Quick-Step Floors (2017 season)	Belgium	Shimano; FSA	Specialized Venge; S-Works Tarmac; Specialized Roubaix	Specialized Shiv	Roval; HED
SKY	Team Sky (2017 season)	Great Britain	Shimano	Pinarello Dogma F8; Pinarello Dogma K8-S	Pinarello Bolide	Shimano
SUN	Team Sunweb (2017 season)	Germany	Shimano	Giant TCR Advanced SL; Giant Propel Advanced SL; Giant Defy Advanced SL	Giant Trinity	Shimano
TFS	Trek–Segafredo (2017 season)	United States	Shimano	Trek Emonda; Trek Madone; Trek Domane	Trek SpeedConcept	Bontrager
UAD	UAE Team Emirates (2017 season)	United Arab Emirates	Campagnolo	Colnago C60; Colnago Concept; Colnago V1-R	Colnago K-Zero	Campagnolo

== Riders ==
=== AG2R La Mondiale ===
Rider	Date of birth
Gediminas Bagdonas (LTU)	26 December 1985 (aged 31)
Jan Bakelants (BEL)	14 February 1986 (aged 30)
Rudy Barbier (FRA)	18 December 1992 (aged 24)
Romain Bardet (FRA)	9 November 1990 (aged 26)
Julien Bérard (FRA)	2 July 1987 (aged 29)
François Bidard (FRA)	19 March 1992 (aged 24)
Mikaël Cherel (FRA)	17 March 1986 (aged 30)
Clément Chevrier (FRA)	29 June 1992 (aged 24)
Nico Denz (GER)	15 February 1994 (aged 22)
Axel Domont (FRA)	August 7, 1990 (aged 25)
Samuel Dumoulin (FRA)	20 August 1980 (aged 36)
Hubert Dupont (FRA)	13 November 1980 (aged 36)
Sondre Holst Enger (NOR)	17 December 1993 (aged 23)
Mathias Frank (SUI)	9 December 1986 (aged 30)

Rider	Date of birth
Ben Gastauer (LUX)	14 November 1987 (aged 29)
Cyril Gautier (FRA)	26 September 1987 (aged 29)
Alexis Gougeard (FRA)	5 March 1993 (aged 23)
Hugo Houle (CAN)	27 September 1990 (aged 26)
Quentin Jaurégui (FRA)	22 April 1994 (aged 22)
Pierre Latour (FRA)	12 October 1993 (aged 23)
Matteo Montaguti (ITA)	6 January 1984 (aged 32)
Oliver Naesen (BEL)	16 September 1990 (aged 26)
Nans Peters (FRA)	12 March 1994 (aged 22)
Domenico Pozzovivo (ITA)	30 November 1982 (aged 34)
Christophe Riblon (FRA)	17 January 1981 (aged 35)
Stijn Vandenbergh (BEL)	25 April 1984 (aged 32)
Alexis Vuillermoz (FRA)	1 June 1988 (aged 28)

=== Astana ===
Rider	Date of birth
Fabio Aru (ITA)	3 July 1990 (aged 26)
Pello Bilbao (ESP)	25 February 1990 (aged 26)
Zhandos Bizhigitov (KAZ)	10 June 1991 (aged 25)
Matti Breschel (DEN)	31 August 1984 (aged 32)
Dario Cataldo (ITA)	17 March 1985 (aged 31)
Sergey Chernetskiy (RUS)	9 April 1990 (aged 26)
Laurens De Vreese (BEL)	29 September 1988 (aged 28)
Daniil Fominykh (KAZ)	28 August 1991 (aged 25)
Jakob Fuglsang (DEN)	22 March 1985 (aged 31)
Oscar Gatto (ITA)	1 January 1985 (aged 32)
Dmitriy Gruzdev (KAZ)	13 March 1986 (aged 30)
Jesper Hansen (DEN)	23 October 1990 (aged 26)
Andriy Hrivko (UKR)	7 August 1983 (aged 33)
Arman Kamyshev (KAZ)	14 March 1991 (aged 25)
Tanel Kangert (EST)	11 March 1987 (aged 29)

Rider	Date of birth
Truls Engen Korsæth (NOR)	16 September 1993 (aged 23)
Bakhtiyar Kozhatayev (KAZ)	28 March 1992 (aged 24)
Miguel Ángel López (COL)	4 February 1994 (aged 22)
Alexey Lutsenko (KAZ)	7 September 1992 (aged 24)
Riccardo Minali (ITA)	19 April 1995 (aged 21)
Moreno Moser (ITA)	25 December 1990 (aged 26)
Luis León Sánchez (ESP)	24 November 1983 (aged 33)
Michele Scarponi (ITA)	25 September 1979 (aged 37)
Nikita Stalnov (KAZ)	14 September 1991 (aged 25)
Paolo Tiralongo (ITA)	8 July 1977 (aged 39)
Ruslan Tleubayev (KAZ)	7 March 1987 (aged 29)
Michael Valgren (DEN)	7 February 1992 (aged 24)
Artyom Zakharov (KAZ)	27 October 1991 (aged 25)
Andrey Zeits (KAZ)	14 December 1986 (aged 30)

=== Bahrain–Merida ===
Rider	Date of birth
Valerio Agnoli (ITA)	6 January 1985 (aged 31)
Yukiya Arashiro (JPN)	22 September 1984 (aged 32)
Manuele Boaro (ITA)	12 March 1987 (aged 29)
Grega Bole (SLO)	13 August 1985 (aged 31)
Niccolò Bonifazio (ITA)	9 October 1993 (aged 23)
Borut Božič (SLO)	8 August 1980 (aged 36)
Ondřej Cink (CZE)	7 December 1990 (aged 26)
Sonny Colbrelli (ITA)	17 May 1990 (aged 26)
Chun Kai Feng (TWN)	2 November 1988 (aged 28)
Ivan García (ESP)	20 November 1995 (aged 21)
Enrico Gasparotto (ITA)	22 March 1982 (aged 34)
Tsgabu Grmay (ETH)	25 August 1991 (aged 25)
Heinrich Haussler (AUS)	25 February 1984 (aged 32)
Jon Ander Insausti (ESP)	13 December 1992 (aged 24)

Rider	Date of birth
Ion Izagirre (ESP)	4 February 1989 (aged 27)
Javier Moreno (ESP)	18 July 1984 (aged 32)
Ramūnas Navardauskas (LTU)	30 August 1988 (aged 28)
Antonio Nibali (ITA)	23 October 1992 (aged 24)
Vincenzo Nibali (ITA)	14 November 1984 (aged 32)
Domen Novak (SLO)	12 July 1995 (aged 21)
Franco Pellizotti (ITA)	15 January 1978 (aged 38)
David Per (SLO)	13 February 1995 (aged 21)
Luka Pibernik (SLO)	23 October 1993 (aged 23)
Joaquim Rodríguez (ESP)	12 May 1979 (aged 37)
Kanstantsin Sivtsov (BLR)	9 August 1982 (aged 34)
Giovanni Visconti (ITA)	13 January 1983 (aged 33)
Wang Meiyin (CHN)	26 December 1988 (aged 28)

=== BMC Racing Team ===
Rider	Date of birth
Tom Bohli (SUI)	January 17, 1994 (aged 22)
Brent Bookwalter (USA)	February 16, 1984 (aged 32)
Damiano Caruso (ITA)	August 12, 1987 (aged 29)
Alessandro De Marchi (ITA)	May 19, 1986 (aged 30)
Rohan Dennis (AUS)	May 28, 1990 (aged 26)
Silvan Dillier (SUI)	August 3, 1990 (aged 26)
Jempy Drucker (LUX)	September 3, 1986 (aged 30)
Martin Elmiger (SUI)	September 23, 1978 (aged 38)
Kilian Frankiny (SUI)	January 26, 1994 (aged 22)
Floris Gerts (NED)	May 3, 1992 (aged 24)
Ben Hermans (BEL)	June 8, 1986 (aged 30)
Stefan Küng (SUI)	November 16, 1993 (aged 23)
Amaël Moinard (FRA)	February 2, 1982 (aged 34)
Daniel Oss (ITA)	January 13, 1987 (aged 29)

Rider	Date of birth
Richie Porte (AUS)	June 30, 1985 (aged 31)
Manuel Quinziato (ITA)	October 30, 1979 (aged 37)
Nicolas Roche (IRL)	July 3, 1984 (aged 32)
Joey Rosskopf (USA)	September 5, 1989 (aged 27)
Samuel Sánchez (ESP)	February 5, 1978 (aged 38)
Michael Schär (SUI)	September 29, 1986 (aged 30)
Miles Scotson (AUS)	January 18, 1994 (aged 22)
Manuel Senni (ITA)	March 11, 1992 (aged 24)
Dylan Teuns (BEL)	March 1, 1992 (aged 24)
Greg Van Avermaet (BEL)	May 17, 1985 (aged 31)
Tejay van Garderen (USA)	August 12, 1988 (aged 28)
Francisco Ventoso (ESP)	May 6, 1982 (aged 34)
Loïc Vliegen (BEL)	December 20, 1993 (aged 23)
Danilo Wyss (SUI)	August 26, 1985 (aged 31)

=== Bora–Hansgrohe ===
Rider	Date of birth
Pascal Ackermann (GER)	17 January 1994 (aged 22)
Shane Archbold (NZL)	2 February 1989 (aged 27)
Jan Bárta (CZE)	7 December 1984 (aged 32)
Erik Baška (SVK)	12 January 1994 (aged 22)
Cesare Benedetti (ITA)	3 August 1987 (aged 29)
Sam Bennett (IRL)	16 October 1990 (aged 26)
Maciej Bodnar (POL)	7 March 1985 (aged 31)
Emanuel Buchmann (GER)	18 November 1992 (aged 24)
Marcus Burghardt (GER)	30 June 1983 (aged 33)
Silvio Herklotz (GER)	5 June 1994 (aged 22)
Michael Kolář (SVK)	21 November 1992 (aged 24)
Leopold König (CZE)	15 November 1987 (aged 29)
Patrick Konrad (AUT)	13 October 1991 (aged 25)
Rafał Majka (POL)	12 September 1989 (aged 27)

Rider	Date of birth
Jay McCarthy (AUS)	8 September 1992 (aged 24)
José Mendes (POR)	24 April 1985 (aged 31)
Gregor Mühlberger (AUT)	4 April 1994 (aged 22)
Matteo Pelucchi (ITA)	21 January 1989 (aged 27)
Christoph Pfingsten (GER)	20 November 1987 (aged 29)
Paweł Poljański (POL)	6 May 1990 (aged 26)
Lukas Pöstlberger (AUT)	10 January 1992 (aged 24)
Juraj Sagan (SVK)	23 December 1988 (aged 28)
Peter Sagan (SVK)	26 January 1990 (aged 26)
Aleksejs Saramotins (LAT)	8 April 1982 (aged 34)
Andreas Schillinger (GER)	13 July 1983 (aged 33)
Michael Schwarzmann (GER)	7 January 1991 (aged 25)
Rüdiger Selig (GER)	19 February 1989 (aged 27)

=== Cannondale–Drapac ===
Rider	Date of birth
Alberto Bettiol (ITA)	October 23, 1993 (aged 23)
Patrick Bevin (NZL)	May 1, 1991 (aged 25)
Nathan Brown (USA)	July 6, 1991 (aged 25)
Brendan Canty (AUS)	January 17, 1992 (aged 24)
Hugh Carthy (GBR)	July 9, 1994 (aged 22)
Simon Clarke (AUS)	July 18, 1986 (aged 30)
Will Clarke (AUS)	April 11, 1985 (aged 31)
Lawson Craddock (USA)	February 20, 1992 (aged 24)
Joe Dombrowski (USA)	May 12, 1991 (aged 25)
Davide Formolo (ITA)	October 25, 1992 (aged 24)
Alex Howes (USA)	January 1, 1988 (aged 29)
Kristijan Koren (SLO)	November 25, 1986 (aged 30)
Sebastian Langeveld (NED)	January 17, 1985 (aged 31)
Ryan Mullen (IRL)	August 7, 1994 (aged 22)

Rider	Date of birth
Taylor Phinney (USA)	June 27, 1990 (aged 26)
Pierre Rolland (FRA)	October 10, 1986 (aged 30)
Tom Scully (NZL)	January 14, 1990 (aged 26)
Toms Skujiņš (LAT)	June 15, 1991 (aged 25)
Tom-Jelte Slagter (NED)	July 1, 1989 (aged 27)
Andrew Talansky (USA)	November 23, 1988 (aged 28)
Rigoberto Urán (COL)	January 26, 1987 (aged 29)
Tom Van Asbroeck (BEL)	April 19, 1990 (aged 26)
Dylan van Baarle (NED)	May 22, 1993 (aged 23)
Sep Vanmarcke (BEL)	July 27, 1988 (aged 28)
Davide Villella (ITA)	June 27, 1991 (aged 25)
Wouter Wippert (NED)	August 14, 1990 (aged 26)
Michael Woods (CAN)	October 12, 1986 (aged 30)

=== Team Dimension Data ===
Rider	Date of birth
Igor Antón (ESP)	2 March 1983 (aged 33)
Natnael Berhane (ERI)	5 January 1991 (aged 25)
Edvald Boasson Hagen (NOR)	17 May 1987 (aged 29)
Mark Cavendish (GBR)	21 May 1985 (aged 31)
Steve Cummings (GBR)	19 March 1981 (aged 35)
Mekseb Debesay (ERI)	16 June 1991 (aged 25)
Nicolas Dougall (RSA)	21 November 1992 (aged 24)
Bernhard Eisel (AUT)	17 February 1981 (aged 35)
Tyler Farrar (USA)	2 June 1984 (aged 32)
Omar Fraile (ESP)	17 July 1990 (aged 26)
Ryan Gibbons (RSA)	13 August 1994 (aged 22)
Nathan Haas (AUS)	12 March 1989 (aged 27)
Jacques Janse van Rensburg (RSA)	6 September 1987 (aged 29)
Reinardt Janse van Rensburg (RSA)	3 February 1989 (aged 27)

Rider	Date of birth
Ben King (USA)	22 March 1989 (aged 27)
Merhawi Kudus (ERI)	23 January 1994 (aged 22)
Lachlan Morton (AUS)	1 February 1992 (aged 24)
Adrien Niyonshuti (RWA)	2 February 1987 (aged 29)
Ben O'Connor (AUS)	25 November 1995 (aged 21)
Serge Pauwels (BEL)	21 November 1983 (aged 33)
Youcef Reguigui (ALG)	9 January 1990 (aged 26)
Mark Renshaw (AUS)	22 October 1982 (aged 34)
Kristian Sbaragli (ITA)	8 May 1990 (aged 26)
Daniel Teklehaimanot (ERI)	10 November 1988 (aged 28)
Jay Thomson (RSA)	12 April 1986 (aged 30)
Scott Thwaites (GBR)	12 February 1990 (aged 26)
Johann van Zyl (RSA)	2 February 1991 (aged 25)
Jaco Venter (RSA)	13 February 1987 (aged 29)

=== FDJ ===
Rider	Date of birth
William Bonnet (FRA)	25 June 1982 (aged 34)
Davide Cimolai (ITA)	13 August 1989 (aged 27)
Arnaud Courteille (FRA)	13 March 1989 (aged 27)
Mickaël Delage (FRA)	6 August 1985 (aged 31)
Arnaud Démare (FRA)	26 August 1991 (aged 25)
Odd Christian Eiking (NOR)	28 December 1994 (aged 22)
Marc Fournier (FRA)	12 November 1994 (aged 22)
David Gaudu (FRA)	10 October 1996 (aged 20)
Jacopo Guarnieri (ITA)	14 August 1987 (aged 29)
Daniel Hoelgaard (NOR)	1 July 1993 (aged 23)
Ignatas Konovalovas (LTU)	8 December 1985 (aged 31)
Mathieu Ladagnous (FRA)	12 December 1984 (aged 32)
Johan Le Bon (FRA)	3 October 1990 (aged 26)
Olivier Le Gac (FRA)	27 August 1993 (aged 23)
Tobias Ludvigsson (SWE)	22 February 1991 (aged 25)

Rider	Date of birth
Jérémy Maison (FRA)	21 July 1993 (aged 23)
Lorrenzo Manzin (FRA)	26 July 1994 (aged 22)
Rudy Molard (FRA)	17 September 1989 (aged 27)
Steve Morabito (SUI)	30 January 1983 (aged 33)
Cédric Pineau (FRA)	8 May 1985 (aged 31)
Thibaut Pinot (FRA)	29 May 1990 (aged 26)
Sébastien Reichenbach (SUI)	28 May 1989 (aged 27)
Kévin Reza (FRA)	18 May 1988 (aged 28)
Anthony Roux (FRA)	18 April 1987 (aged 29)
Jérémy Roy (FRA)	22 June 1983 (aged 33)
Marc Sarreau (FRA)	10 June 1993 (aged 23)
Benoît Vaugrenard (FRA)	5 January 1982 (aged 34)
Arthur Vichot (FRA)	26 November 1988 (aged 28)
Léo Vincent (FRA)	6 November 1995 (aged 21)

=== Team Katusha–Alpecin ===
Rider	Date of birth
Maxim Belkov (RUS)	9 January 1985 (aged 31)
Jenthe Biermans (BEL)	30 October 1995 (aged 21)
Sven Erik Bystrøm (NOR)	21 January 1992 (aged 24)
José Gonçalves (POR)	13 February 1989 (aged 27)
Marco Haller (AUT)	1 April 1991 (aged 25)
Reto Hollenstein (SUI)	22 August 1985 (aged 31)
Robert Kišerlovski (CRO)	9 August 1986 (aged 30)
Pavel Kochetkov (RUS)	7 March 1986 (aged 30)
Alexander Kristoff (NOR)	5 July 1987 (aged 29)
Vyacheslav Kuznetsov (RUS)	24 June 1989 (aged 27)
Maurits Lammertink (NED)	31 August 1990 (aged 26)
Alberto Losada (ESP)	28 February 1982 (aged 34)
Tiago Machado (POR)	18 October 1985 (aged 31)

Rider	Date of birth
Matvey Mamykin (RUS)	31 October 1994 (aged 22)
Tony Martin (GER)	23 April 1985 (aged 31)
Marco Mathis (GER)	7 April 1994 (aged 22)
Michael Mørkøv (DEN)	30 April 1985 (aged 31)
Baptiste Planckaert (BEL)	28 September 1988 (aged 28)
Nils Politt (GER)	6 March 1994 (aged 22)
Jhonatan Restrepo (COL)	24 November 1994 (aged 22)
Simon Špilak (SLO)	23 June 1986 (aged 30)
Rein Taaramäe (EST)	24 April 1987 (aged 29)
Ángel Vicioso (ESP)	13 April 1977 (aged 39)
Mads Würtz Schmidt (DEN)	31 March 1994 (aged 22)
Rick Zabel (GER)	7 December 1993 (aged 23)
Ilnur Zakarin (RUS)	15 September 1989 (aged 27)

=== LottoNL–Jumbo ===
Rider	Date of birth
Enrico Battaglin (ITA)	17 November 1989 (aged 27)
George Bennett (NZL)	17 November 1990 (aged 26)
Lars Boom (NED)	30 December 1985 (aged 31)
Koen Bouwman (NED)	2 December 1993 (aged 23)
Victor Campenaerts (BEL)	28 October 1991 (aged 25)
Twan Castelijns (NED)	23 January 1989 (aged 27)
Stef Clement (NED)	24 September 1982 (aged 34)
Floris De Tier (BEL)	20 January 1992 (aged 24)
Robert Gesink (NED)	31 May 1986 (aged 30)
Dylan Groenewegen (NED)	21 June 1993 (aged 23)
Amund Grøndahl Jansen (NOR)	11 February 1994 (aged 22)
Martijn Keizer (NED)	25 March 1988 (aged 28)
Steven Kruijswijk (NED)	7 June 1987 (aged 29)
Steven Lammertink (NED)	4 December 1993 (aged 23)
Tom Leezer (NED)	26 December 1985 (aged 31)

Rider	Date of birth
Bert-Jan Lindeman (NED)	16 June 1989 (aged 27)
Juan José Lobato (ESP)	30 December 1988 (aged 28)
Paul Martens (GER)	26 October 1983 (aged 33)
Daan Olivier (NED)	24 November 1992 (aged 24)
Primož Roglič (SLO)	29 October 1989 (aged 27)
Timo Roosen (NED)	11 January 1993 (aged 23)
Bram Tankink (NED)	3 December 1978 (aged 38)
Antwan Tolhoek (NED)	29 April 1994 (aged 22)
Jurgen Van den Broeck (BEL)	1 February 1983 (aged 33)
Jos van Emden (NED)	27 June 1985 (aged 31)
Gijs Van Hoecke (BEL)	12 November 1991 (aged 25)
Alexey Vermeulen (USA)	29 October 1994 (aged 22)
Robert Wagner (GER)	17 April 1983 (aged 33)
Maarten Wynants (BEL)	13 May 1982 (aged 34)

=== Lotto–Soudal ===
Rider	Date of birth
Sander Armée (BEL)	10 December 1985 (aged 31)
Lars Bak (DEN)	16 January 1980 (aged 36)
Tiesj Benoot (BEL)	11 March 1994 (aged 22)
Kris Boeckmans (BEL)	13 February 1987 (aged 29)
Sean De Bie (BEL)	3 October 1991 (aged 25)
Jasper De Buyst (BEL)	24 November 1993 (aged 23)
Bart De Clercq (BEL)	26 August 1986 (aged 30)
Thomas De Gendt (BEL)	6 November 1986 (aged 30)
Jens Debusschere (BEL)	28 August 1989 (aged 27)
Frederik Frison (BEL)	28 July 1992 (aged 24)
Tony Gallopin (FRA)	19 April 1988 (aged 28)
André Greipel (GER)	16 July 1982 (aged 34)
Adam Hansen (AUS)	11 May 1981 (aged 35)
Moreno Hofland (NED)	31 August 1991 (aged 25)

Rider	Date of birth
Nikolas Maes (BEL)	9 April 1986 (aged 30)
Tomasz Marczyński (POL)	6 March 1984 (aged 32)
Rémy Mertz (BEL)	17 July 1995 (aged 21)
Maxime Monfort (BEL)	14 January 1983 (aged 33)
Jürgen Roelandts (BEL)	2 July 1985 (aged 31)
James Shaw (GBR)	13 June 1996 (aged 20)
Marcel Sieberg (GER)	30 April 1982 (aged 34)
Rafael Valls (ESP)	27 June 1987 (aged 29)
Tosh Van der Sande (BEL)	28 November 1990 (aged 26)
Jelle Vanendert (BEL)	19 February 1985 (aged 31)
Louis Vervaeke (BEL)	6 November 1993 (aged 23)
Jelle Wallays (BEL)	11 May 1989 (aged 27)
Tim Wellens (BEL)	10 May 1991 (aged 25)
Enzo Wouters (BEL)	21 March 1996 (aged 20)

=== Movistar Team ===
Rider	Date of birth
Andrey Amador (CRC)	29 August 1986 (aged 30)
Winner Anacona (COL)	11 September 1988 (aged 28)
Jorge Arcas (ESP)	8 July 1992 (aged 24)
Carlos Barbero (ESP)	29 April 1991 (aged 25)
Daniele Bennati (ITA)	24 September 1980 (aged 36)
Carlos Betancur (COL)	13 October 1989 (aged 27)
Nuno Bico (POR)	3 July 1994 (aged 22)
Richard Carapaz (ECU)	29 May 1993 (aged 23)
Héctor Carretero (ESP)	28 May 1995 (aged 21)
Jonathan Castroviejo (ESP)	27 April 1987 (aged 29)
Víctor de la Parte (ESP)	22 June 1986 (aged 30)
Alex Dowsett (GBR)	3 October 1988 (aged 28)
Imanol Erviti (ESP)	15 November 1983 (aged 33)
Rubén Fernández (ESP)	1 March 1991 (aged 25)

Rider	Date of birth
Jesús Herrada (ESP)	26 July 1990 (aged 26)
José Herrada (ESP)	1 October 1985 (aged 31)
Gorka Izagirre (ESP)	7 October 1987 (aged 29)
Adriano Malori (ITA)	28 January 1988 (aged 28)
Daniel Moreno (ESP)	5 September 1981 (aged 35)
Nelson Oliveira (POR)	6 March 1989 (aged 27)
Antonio Pedrero (ESP)	23 October 1991 (aged 25)
Dayer Quintana (COL)	10 August 1992 (aged 24)
Nairo Quintana (COL)	4 February 1990 (aged 26)
José Joaquín Rojas (ESP)	8 June 1985 (aged 31)
Marc Soler (ESP)	22 November 1993 (aged 23)
Rory Sutherland (AUS)	8 February 1982 (aged 34)
Jasha Sütterlin (GER)	4 November 1992 (aged 24)
Alejandro Valverde (ESP)	25 April 1980 (aged 36)

=== Orica–Scott ===
Rider	Date of birth
Michael Albasini (SUI)	20 December 1980 (aged 36)
Sam Bewley (NZL)	22 July 1987 (aged 29)
Esteban Chaves (COL)	17 January 1990 (aged 26)
Cheung King Lok (HKG)	8 February 1991 (aged 25)
Magnus Cort (DEN)	16 January 1993 (aged 23)
Mitchell Docker (AUS)	2 October 1986 (aged 30)
Luke Durbridge (AUS)	9 April 1991 (aged 25)
Alex Edmondson (AUS)	22 December 1993 (aged 23)
Caleb Ewan (AUS)	11 July 1994 (aged 22)
Simon Gerrans (AUS)	16 May 1980 (aged 36)
Jack Haig (AUS)	6 September 1993 (aged 23)
Mathew Hayman (AUS)	20 April 1978 (aged 38)
Michael Hepburn (AUS)	17 August 1991 (aged 25)

Rider	Date of birth
Damien Howson (AUS)	13 August 1992 (aged 24)
Daryl Impey (RSA)	6 December 1984 (aged 32)
Christopher Juul-Jensen (DEN)	6 July 1989 (aged 27)
Jens Keukeleire (BEL)	23 November 1988 (aged 28)
Roger Kluge (GER)	5 February 1986 (aged 30)
Roman Kreuziger (CZE)	6 May 1986 (aged 30)
Luka Mezgec (SLO)	27 June 1988 (aged 28)
Rubén Plaza (ESP)	29 February 1980 (aged 36)
Robert Power (AUS)	11 May 1995 (aged 21)
Svein Tuft (CAN)	19 May 1977 (aged 39)
Carlos Verona (ESP)	4 November 1992 (aged 24)
Adam Yates (GBR)	7 August 1992 (aged 24)
Simon Yates (GBR)	7 August 1992 (aged 24)

=== Quick-Step Floors ===
Rider	Date of birth
Julian Alaphilippe (FRA)	11 June 1992 (aged 24)
Jack Bauer (NZL)	7 April 1985 (aged 31)
Tom Boonen (BEL)	15 October 1980 (aged 36)
Gianluca Brambilla (ITA)	22 August 1987 (aged 29)
Eros Capecchi (ITA)	13 June 1986 (aged 30)
Rémi Cavagna (FRA)	10 August 1995 (aged 21)
David de la Cruz (ESP)	6 May 1989 (aged 27)
Laurens De Plus (BEL)	4 September 1995 (aged 21)
Tim Declercq (BEL)	21 March 1989 (aged 27)
Dries Devenyns (BEL)	22 July 1983 (aged 33)
Fernando Gaviria (COL)	19 August 1994 (aged 22)
Philippe Gilbert (BEL)	5 July 1982 (aged 34)
Bob Jungels (LUX)	22 September 1992 (aged 24)
Iljo Keisse (BEL)	21 December 1982 (aged 34)
Marcel Kittel (GER)	11 May 1988 (aged 28)

Rider	Date of birth
Yves Lampaert (BEL)	10 April 1991 (aged 25)
Dan Martin (IRL)	20 August 1986 (aged 30)
Davide Martinelli (ITA)	31 May 1993 (aged 23)
Enric Mas (ESP)	7 January 1995 (aged 21)
Maximiliano Richeze (ARG)	7 March 1983 (aged 33)
Fabio Sabatini (ITA)	10 February 1985 (aged 31)
Maximilian Schachmann (GER)	9 January 1994 (aged 22)
Pieter Serry (BEL)	21 November 1988 (aged 28)
Zdeněk Štybar (CZE)	11 December 1985 (aged 31)
Niki Terpstra (NED)	18 May 1984 (aged 32)
Matteo Trentin (ITA)	2 August 1989 (aged 27)
Petr Vakoč (CZE)	11 July 1992 (aged 24)
Martin Velits (SVK)	21 February 1985 (aged 31)
Julien Vermote (BEL)	26 July 1989 (aged 27)

=== Team Sky ===
Rider	Date of birth
Ian Boswell (USA)	7 February 1991 (aged 25)
Philip Deignan (IRL)	7 September 1983 (aged 33)
Jonathan Dibben (GBR)	12 February 1994 (aged 22)
Owain Doull (GBR)	2 May 1993 (aged 23)
Kenny Elissonde (FRA)	22 July 1991 (aged 25)
Chris Froome (GBR)	20 May 1985 (aged 31)
Tao Geoghegan Hart (GBR)	30 March 1995 (aged 21)
Michał Gołaś (POL)	29 April 1984 (aged 32)
Sebastián Henao (COL)	5 August 1993 (aged 23)
Sergio Henao (COL)	10 December 1987 (aged 29)
Beñat Intxausti (ESP)	20 March 1986 (aged 30)
Peter Kennaugh (GBR)	15 June 1989 (aged 27)
Vasil Kiryienka (BLR)	28 June 1981 (aged 35)
Christian Knees (GER)	5 March 1981 (aged 35)

Rider	Date of birth
Michał Kwiatkowski (POL)	2 June 1990 (aged 26)
Mikel Landa (ESP)	3 December 1989 (aged 27)
David López (ESP)	13 May 1981 (aged 35)
Gianni Moscon (ITA)	20 April 1994 (aged 22)
Mikel Nieve (ESP)	26 May 1984 (aged 32)
Wout Poels (NED)	1 October 1987 (aged 29)
Salvatore Puccio (ITA)	31 August 1989 (aged 27)
Diego Rosa (ITA)	27 March 1989 (aged 27)
Luke Rowe (GBR)	10 March 1990 (aged 26)
Ian Stannard (GBR)	25 May 1987 (aged 29)
Geraint Thomas (GBR)	25 May 1986 (aged 30)
Danny van Poppel (NED)	26 July 1993 (aged 23)
Elia Viviani (ITA)	7 February 1989 (aged 27)
Łukasz Wiśniowski (POL)	7 December 1991 (aged 25)

=== Team Sunweb ===
Rider	Date of birth
Nikias Arndt (GER)	18 November 1991 (aged 25)
Warren Barguil (FRA)	28 October 1991 (aged 25)
Phil Bauhaus (GER)	8 July 1994 (aged 22)
Roy Curvers (NED)	27 December 1979 (aged 37)
Bert De Backer (BEL)	2 April 1984 (aged 32)
Tom Dumoulin (NED)	11 November 1990 (aged 26)
Johannes Fröhlinger (GER)	9 June 1985 (aged 31)
Simon Geschke (GER)	13 March 1986 (aged 30)
Chad Haga (USA)	26 August 1988 (aged 28)
Chris Hamilton (AUS)	18 May 1995 (aged 21)
Lennard Hofstede (NED)	29 December 1994 (aged 22)
Lennard Kämna (GER)	9 September 1996 (aged 20)
Wilco Kelderman (NED)	25 March 1991 (aged 25)

Rider	Date of birth
Søren Kragh Andersen (DNK)	10 August 1994 (aged 22)
Sindre Lunke (NOR)	17 April 1993 (aged 23)
Michael Matthews (AUS)	26 September 1990 (aged 26)
Sam Oomen (NED)	15 August 1995 (aged 21)
Georg Preidler (AUT)	17 June 1990 (aged 26)
Ramon Sinkeldam (NED)	9 February 1989 (aged 27)
Tom Stamsnijder (NED)	15 May 1985 (aged 31)
Laurens ten Dam (NED)	13 November 1980 (aged 36)
Mike Teunissen (NED)	25 August 1992 (aged 24)
Albert Timmer (NED)	13 June 1985 (aged 31)
Zico Waeytens (BEL)	29 September 1991 (aged 25)
Max Walscheid (GER)	13 June 1993 (aged 23)

=== Trek–Segafredo ===
Rider	Date of birth
Eugenio Alafaci (ITA)	August 9, 1990 (aged 26)
Fumiyuki Beppu (JPN)	April 10, 1983 (aged 33)
Julien Bernard (FRA)	March 17, 1992 (aged 24)
Matthias Brändle (AUT)	December 7, 1989 (aged 27)
André Cardoso (POR)	September 3, 1984 (aged 32)
Marco Coledan (ITA)	August 22, 1988 (aged 28)
Alberto Contador (ESP)	December 6, 1982 (aged 34)
Gregory Daniel (USA)	November 8, 1994 (aged 22)
Koen de Kort (NED)	September 8, 1982 (aged 34)
John Degenkolb (GER)	January 7, 1989 (aged 27)
Laurent Didier (LUX)	July 19, 1984 (aged 32)
Fabio Felline (ITA)	March 29, 1990 (aged 26)
Michael Gogl (AUT)	November 4, 1993 (aged 23)
Ruben Guerreiro (POR)	July 6, 1994 (aged 22)

Rider	Date of birth
Jesús Hernández (ESP)	September 28, 1981 (aged 35)
Markel Irizar (ESP)	February 5, 1980 (aged 36)
Bauke Mollema (NED)	November 26, 1986 (aged 30)
Giacomo Nizzolo (ITA)	January 30, 1989 (aged 27)
Jarlinson Pantano (COL)	November 19, 1988 (aged 28)
Mads Pedersen (DNK)	December 18, 1995 (aged 21)
Grégory Rast (SUI)	January 17, 1980 (aged 36)
Kiel Reijnen (USA)	June 1, 1986 (aged 30)
Peter Stetina (USA)	August 8, 1987 (aged 29)
Jasper Stuyven (BEL)	April 17, 1992 (aged 24)
Edward Theuns (BEL)	April 30, 1991 (aged 25)
Boy van Poppel (NED)	January 18, 1988 (aged 28)
Haimar Zubeldia (ESP)	April 1, 1977 (aged 39)

=== UAE Team Emirates ===
Rider	Date of birth
Anass Aït El Abdia (MAR)	21 March 1993 (age 32)
Darwin Atapuma (COL)	15 January 1988 (aged 28)
Matteo Bono (ITA)	11 November 1983 (aged 33)
Simone Consonni (ITA)	12 September 1994 (aged 22)
Valerio Conti (ITA)	30 March 1993 (aged 23)
Rui Costa (POR)	5 October 1986 (aged 30)
Kristijan Đurasek (CRO)	26 July 1987 (aged 29)
Roberto Ferrari (ITA)	9 March 1983 (aged 33)
Filippo Ganna (ITA)	25 July 1996 (aged 20)
Andrea Guardini (ITA)	12 June 1989 (aged 27)
Marko Kump (SLO)	9 September 1988 (aged 28)
Vegard Stake Laengen (NOR)	7 February 1989 (aged 27)
Marco Marcato (ITA)	11 February 1984 (aged 32)

Rider	Date of birth
Louis Meintjes (RSA)	21 February 1992 (aged 24)
Yousif Mirza (UAE)	8 October 1988 (aged 28)
Sacha Modolo (ITA)	19 June 1987 (aged 29)
Matej Mohorič (SLO)	19 October 1994 (aged 22)
Manuele Mori (ITA)	9 August 1980 (aged 36)
Przemysław Niemiec (POL)	11 April 1980 (aged 36)
Simone Petilli (ITA)	4 May 1993 (aged 23)
Jan Polanc (SLO)	6 May 1992 (aged 24)
Edward Ravasi (ITA)	5 June 1994 (aged 22)
Ben Swift (GBR)	5 November 1987 (aged 29)
Oliviero Troia (ITA)	1 September 1994 (aged 22)
Diego Ulissi (ITA)	15 July 1989 (aged 27)
Federico Zurlo (ITA)	25 February 1994 (aged 22)

== See also ==
- 2017 in men's road cycling
- List of 2017 UCI Professional Continental and Continental teams
- List of 2017 UCI Women's Teams

Preceded by 2016	List of UCI WorldTeams and riders 2017	Succeeded by 2018
