= 2017 Team Sky season =

Team Sky
- 2017 season
- UCI code: SKY
- Status: UCI WorldTeam
- World Tour Rank: 1st (12806 points)
- Manager: Dave Brailsford
- Main sponsor(s): Sky
- Based: National Cycling Centre; Manchester; England
- Bicycles: Pinarello
- Groupset: Shimano

Season victories
- One-day races: 5
- Stage race overall: 6
- Stage race stages: 17
- Grand Tours: 2
- National Championships: 3
- Most wins: Elia Viviani (7 wins)
- Best ranked rider: Chris Froome (2nd)

The 2017 cycling season began in Australia at the Tour Down Under for Team Sky in January.

As a UCI WorldTeam, they were automatically invited and obliged to send a squad to every event in the UCI World Tour.

== Team roster ==
As of 17 March 2017

| Rider | Date of birth |
|---|---|
| Ian Boswell (USA) | 7 February 1991 (aged 26) |
| Philip Deignan (IRL) | 7 September 1983 (aged 33) |
| Jonathan Dibben (GBR) | 12 February 1994 (aged 23) |
| Owain Doull (GBR) | 2 May 1993 (aged 23) |
| Kenny Elissonde (FRA) | 22 July 1991 (aged 25) |
| Chris Froome (GBR) | 20 May 1985 (aged 31) |
| Tao Geoghegan Hart (GBR) | 30 March 1995 (aged 21) |
| Michał Gołaś (POL) | 29 April 1984 (aged 32) |
| Sebastián Henao (COL) | 5 August 1993 (aged 23) |
| Sergio Henao (COL) | 10 December 1987 (aged 29) |
| Beñat Intxausti (ESP) | 20 March 1986 (aged 30) |
| Peter Kennaugh (GBR) | 15 June 1989 (aged 27) |
| Vasil Kiryienka (BLR) | 28 June 1981 (aged 35) |
| Christian Knees (GER) | 5 March 1981 (aged 36) |

| Rider | Date of birth |
|---|---|
| Michał Kwiatkowski (POL) | 2 June 1990 (aged 26) |
| Mikel Landa (ESP) | 3 December 1989 (aged 27) |
| David López (ESP) | 13 May 1981 (aged 35) |
| Gianni Moscon (ITA) | 20 April 1994 (aged 22) |
| Mikel Nieve (ESP) | 26 May 1984 (aged 32) |
| Wout Poels (NED) | 1 October 1987 (aged 29) |
| Salvatore Puccio (ITA) | 31 August 1989 (aged 27) |
| Diego Rosa (ITA) | 27 March 1989 (aged 27) |
| Luke Rowe (GBR) | 10 March 1990 (aged 27) |
| Ian Stannard (GBR) | 25 May 1987 (aged 29) |
| Geraint Thomas (GBR) | 25 May 1986 (aged 30) |
| Danny van Poppel (NED) | 26 July 1993 (aged 23) |
| Elia Viviani (ITA) | 7 February 1989 (aged 28) |
| Łukasz Wiśniowski (POL) | 7 December 1991 (aged 25) |

Riders who joined the team for the 2017 season

| Rider | 2016 team |
|---|---|
| Jonathan Dibben | WIGGINS |
| Owain Doull | WIGGINS |
| Kenny Elissonde | FDJ |
| Tao Geoghegan Hart | Bissell Development Team |
| Diego Rosa | Astana |
| Łukasz Wiśniowski | Etixx–Quick-Step |

Riders who left the team during or after the 2016 season

| Rider | 2017 team |
|---|---|
| Andrew Fenn | Aqua Blue Sport |
| Leopold König | Bora–Hansgrohe |
| Lars Petter Nordhaug | Aqua Blue Sport |
| Alex Peters | SEG Racing |
| Nicolas Roche | BMC Racing Team |
| Ben Swift | UAE Team Emirates |
| Xabier Zandio | Retired |

== Season victories ==
| Date | Race | Competition | Rider | Country | Location |
|---|---|---|---|---|---|
| 1 February | Herald Sun Tour, Prologue | UCI Oceania Tour | Danny van Poppel (NED) | Australia | Melbourne |
| 3 February | Herald Sun Tour, Stage 2 | UCI Oceania Tour | Luke Rowe (GBR) | Australia | Beechworth |
| 5 February | Herald Sun Tour, Stage 4 | UCI Oceania Tour | Ian Stannard (GBR) | Australia | Kinglake |
| 7 February | Herald Sun Tour, Teams classification | UCI Oceania Tour | (Note: The riders on the squad were Chris Froome, Kenny Elissonde, Danny van Poppel, Ian Stannard, Sebastián Henao and Luke Rowe) | Australia | |
| 19 February | Vuelta a Andalucía, Teams classification | UCI Europe Tour | (Note: The riders on the squad were Vasil Kiryienka, Christian Knees, Mikel Landa, David López, Mikel Nieve, Wout Poels and Diego Rosa) | Spain | |
| 4 March | Strade Bianche | UCI World Tour | Michał Kwiatkowski (POL) | Italy | Siena |
| 9 March | Tirreno–Adriatico, Stage 2 | UCI World Tour | Geraint Thomas (GBR) | Italy | Pomarance |
| 12 March | Paris–Nice, Overall | UCI World Tour | Sergio Henao (COL) | France | |
| 18 March | Milan–San Remo | UCI World Tour | Michał Kwiatkowski (POL) | Italy | Sanremo |
| 19 April | Tour of the Alps, Stage 3 | UCI Europe Tour | Geraint Thomas (GBR) | Italy | Villnöß |
| 21 April | Tour of the Alps, Overall | UCI Europe Tour | Geraint Thomas (GBR) | Austria; Italy | |
| 28 April | Tour de Romandie, Stage 3 | UCI World Tour | Elia Viviani (ITA) | Switzerland | Payerne |
| 19 May | Tour of California, Stage 6 | UCI World Tour | Jonathan Dibben (GBR) | United States | Big Bear Lake |
| 20 May | Tour of California, Teams classification | UCI World Tour | (Note: The riders on the squad were Elia Viviani, Ian Boswell, Jonathan Dibben, Owain Doull, Tao Geoghegan Hart, Peter Kennaugh, David López and Danny van Poppel) | United States | |
| 26 May | Giro d'Italia, Stage 19 | UCI World Tour | Mikel Landa (ESP) | Italy | Piancavallo |
| 28 May | Giro d'Italia, Mountains classification | UCI World Tour | Mikel Landa (ESP) | Italy | |
| 4 June | Hammer Series, Overall | UCI Europe Tour | Team race (Note: The riders on the squad were Ian Boswell, Jonathan Dibben, Owain Doull, Tao Geoghegan Hart, Danny van Poppel and Elia Viviani) | Netherlands | |
| 10 June | Critérium du Dauphiné, Stage 7 | UCI World Tour | Peter Kennaugh (GBR) | France | Alpe d'Huez |
| 16 June | Route du Sud, Stage 2 | UCI Europe Tour | Elia Viviani (ITA) | France | Saramon |
| 18 June | Route du Sud, Teams classification | UCI Europe Tour | (Note: The riders on the squad were Geraint Thomas, Wout Poels, Michał Gołaś, Ian Stannard, Gianni Moscon, Kenny Elissonde, Elia Viviani and Sergio Henao) | France | |
| 1 July | Tour de France, Stage 1 | UCI World Tour | Geraint Thomas (GBR) | Germany | Düsseldorf |
| 23 July | Tour de France, Overall | UCI World Tour | Chris Froome (GBR) | France | |
| 23 July | Tour de France, Teams classification | UCI World Tour | (Note: The riders on the squad were Chris Froome, Sergio Henao, Vasil Kiryienka, Christian Knees, Michał Kwiatkowski, Mikel Landa, Mikel Nieve, Luke Rowe and Geraint Thomas) | France | |
| 29 July | Clásica de San Sebastián | UCI World Tour | Michał Kwiatkowski (POL) | Spain | San Sebastián |
| 1 August | Vuelta a Burgos, Stage 1 | UCI Europe Tour | Mikel Landa (ESP) | Spain | Burgos |
| 2 August | Tour de Pologne, Stage 5 | UCI World Tour | Danny van Poppel (NED) | Poland | Rzeszów |
| 3 August | Vuelta a Burgos, Stage 3 | UCI Europe Tour | Mikel Landa (ESP) | Spain | Picón Blanco |
| 4 August | Tour de Pologne, Stage 7 | UCI World Tour | Wout Poels (NED) | Poland | Bukowina Tatrzańska |
| 4 August | Tour de Pologne, Mountains classification | UCI World Tour | Diego Rosa (ITA) | Poland | |
| 5 August | Vuelta a Burgos, Overall | UCI Europe Tour | Mikel Landa (ESP) | Spain | |
| 5 August | Vuelta a Burgos, Points classification | UCI Europe Tour | Mikel Landa (ESP) | Spain | |
| 5 August | Vuelta a Burgos, Mountains classification | UCI Europe Tour | Mikel Landa (ESP) | Spain | |
| 20 August | EuroEyes Cyclassics | UCI World Tour | Elia Viviani (ITA) | Germany | Hamburg |
| 22 August | Tour du Poitou-Charentes, Stage 1 | UCI Europe Tour | Elia Viviani (ITA) | France | Saintes |
| 24 August | Tour du Poitou-Charentes, Stage 3 | UCI Europe Tour | Elia Viviani (ITA) | France | Neuville-de-Poitou |
| 25 August | Tour du Poitou-Charentes, Points classification | UCI Europe Tour | Elia Viviani (ITA) | France | |
| 27 August | GP Ouest-France | UCI World Tour | Elia Viviani (ITA) | France | Plouay |
| 27 August | Vuelta a España, Stage 9 | UCI World Tour | Chris Froome (GBR) | Spain | Cumbre del Sol |
| 4 September | Tour of Britain, Stage 2 | UCI Europe Tour | Elia Viviani (ITA) | United Kingdom | Blyth |
| 5 September | Vuelta a España, Stage 16 | UCI World Tour | Chris Froome (GBR) | Spain | Logroño |
| 10 September | Vuelta a España, Overall | UCI World Tour | Chris Froome (GBR) | Spain | |
| 10 September | Vuelta a España, Points classification | UCI World Tour | Chris Froome (GBR) | Spain | |
| 10 September | Vuelta a España, Combination classification | UCI World Tour | Chris Froome (GBR) | Spain | |
| 24 October | UCI World Tour, Teams classification | UCI World Tour | (Note: This award is calculated by adding the points earned by a team's riders in the individual standings.) | | |

== National, Continental and World champions 2017 ==
| Date | Discipline | Jersey | Rider | Country | Location |
|---|---|---|---|---|---|
| 26 February | Colombian National Road Race Championships | | Sergio Henao (COL) | Colombia | Bogotá |
| 21 June | Polish National Time Trial Champion | | Michał Kwiatkowski (POL) | Poland | Krokowa |
| 23 June | Italian National Time Trial Champion | | Gianni Moscon (ITA) | Italy | Volpiano |
