= 2017 Orica–Scott (men's team) season =

Orica–Scott
- 2017 season
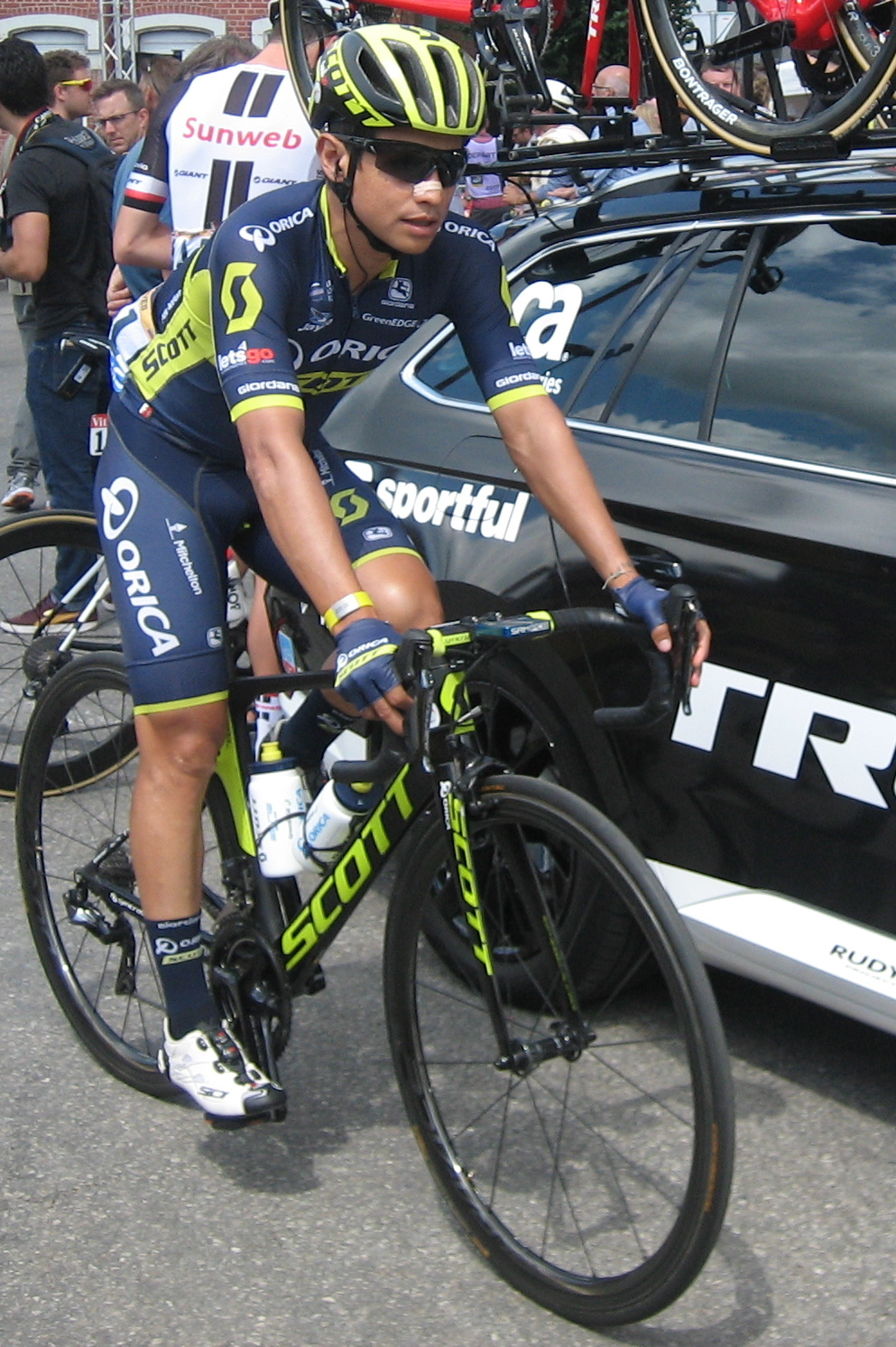
- Esteban Chaves on 2017 Tour de France
- UCI code: ORS
- Status: UCI WorldTeam
- Manager: Shayne Bannan
- Main sponsor(s): Orica, Scott
- Based: Australia
- Bicycles: Scott
- Groupset: Shimano

Season victories
- One-day races: 4
- Stage race overall: 1
- Stage race stages: 17
- National Championships: 3

The 2017 season for the Orica–Scott cycling team began in January at the Tour Down Under. As a UCI WorldTeam, they were automatically invited and obligated to send a squad to every event in the UCI World Tour.

== Team roster ==
As of 1 January 2017.

Rider	Date of birth
Michael Albasini (SUI)	20 December 1980 (aged 36)
Sam Bewley (NZL)	22 July 1987 (aged 29)
Esteban Chaves (COL)	17 January 1990 (aged 26)
Cheung King Lok (HKG)	8 February 1991 (aged 25)
Magnus Cort (DEN)	16 January 1993 (aged 23)
Mitchell Docker (AUS)	2 October 1986 (aged 30)
Luke Durbridge (AUS)	9 April 1991 (aged 25)
Alex Edmondson (AUS)	22 December 1993 (aged 23)
Caleb Ewan (AUS)	11 July 1994 (aged 22)
Simon Gerrans (AUS)	16 May 1980 (aged 36)
Jack Haig (AUS)	6 September 1993 (aged 23)
Mathew Hayman (AUS)	20 April 1978 (aged 38)
Michael Hepburn (AUS)	17 August 1991 (aged 25)

Rider	Date of birth
Damien Howson (AUS)	13 August 1992 (aged 24)
Daryl Impey (RSA)	6 December 1984 (aged 32)
Christopher Juul-Jensen (DEN)	6 July 1989 (aged 27)
Jens Keukeleire (BEL)	23 November 1988 (aged 28)
Roger Kluge (GER)	5 February 1986 (aged 30)
Roman Kreuziger (CZE)	6 May 1986 (aged 30)
Luka Mezgec (SLO)	27 June 1988 (aged 28)
Rubén Plaza (ESP)	29 February 1980 (aged 36)
Robert Power (AUS)	11 May 1995 (aged 21)
Svein Tuft (CAN)	19 May 1977 (aged 39)
Carlos Verona (ESP)	4 November 1992 (aged 24)
Adam Yates (GBR)	7 August 1992 (aged 24)
Simon Yates (GBR)	7 August 1992 (aged 24)

Riders who joined the team for the 2017 season

Rider	2016 team
Roger Kluge	IAM Cycling
Roman Kreuziger	Tinkoff

Riders who left the team during or after the 2016 season

Rider	2017 team
Michael Matthews	Team Sunweb
Christian Meier	Retired
Amets Txurruka	

== Season victories ==
Date	Race	Competition	Rider	Country	Location
17 January	Tour Down Under, Stage 1	UCI World Tour	Caleb Ewan (AUS)	Australia	Lyndoch
19 January	Tour Down Under, Stage 3	UCI World Tour	Caleb Ewan (AUS)	Australia	Victor Harbor
20 January	Tour Down Under, Stage 4	UCI World Tour	Caleb Ewan (AUS)	Australia	Campbelltown
22 January	Tour Down Under, Stage 6	UCI World Tour	Caleb Ewan (AUS)	Australia	Adelaide
22 January	Tour Down Under, Sprints classification	UCI World Tour	Caleb Ewan (AUS)	Australia	
2 February	Herald Sun Tour, Stage 2	UCI Oceania Tour	Damien Howson (AUS)	Australia	Falls Creek
3 February	Volta a la Comunitat Valenciana, Stage 3	UCI Europe Tour	Magnus Cort (DEN)	Spain	Riba-roja de Túria
5 February	Herald Sun Tour, Overall	UCI Oceania Tour	Damien Howson (AUS)	Australia	
12 February	Clásica de Almería	UCI Europe Tour	Magnus Cort (DEN)	Spain	Almería
26 February	Abu Dhabi Tour, Stage 4	UCI Asia Tour	Caleb Ewan (AUS)	United Arab Emirates	Yas Marina Circuit
5 March	GP Industria & Artigianato di Larciano	UCI Europe Tour	Adam Yates (GBR)	Italy	Larciano
10 March	Paris–Nice, Stage 6	UCI World Tour	Simon Yates (GBR)	France	Fayence
25 March	Volta a Catalunya, Stage 6	UCI World Tour	Daryl Impey (RSA)	Spain	Reus
30 March	Three Days of De Panne, Stage 3b	UCI Europe Tour	Luke Durbridge (AUS)	Belgium	De Panne
1 April	GP Miguel Indurain	UCI Europe Tour	Simon Yates (GBR)	Spain	Estella-Lizarra
4 April	Tour of the Basque Country, Stage 2	UCI World Tour	Michael Albasini (SUI)	Spain	Elciego
26 April	Tour de Romandie, Stage 1	UCI World Tour	Michael Albasini (SUI)	Switzerland	Champéry
29 April	Tour de Romandie, Stage 4	UCI World Tour	Simon Yates (GBR)	Switzerland	Leysin
30 April	Tour de Yorkshire, Points classification	UCI Europe Tour	Caleb Ewan (AUS)	United Kingdom	
12 May	Giro d'Italia, Stage 7	UCI World Tour	Caleb Ewan (AUS)	Italy	Alberobello
16 June	Tour of Slovenia, Stage 2	UCI Europe Tour	Luka Mezgec (SLO)	Slovenia	Ljubljana
23 July	Tour de France, Young rider classification	UCI World Tour	Simon Yates (GBR)	France	
1 August	Tour de Pologne, Stage 4	UCI World Tour	Caleb Ewan (AUS)	Poland	Zabrze
3 August	Tour de Pologne, Stage 6	UCI World Tour	Jack Haig (AUS)	Poland	Zakopane
18 August	Arnhem–Veenendaal Classic	UCI Europe Tour	Luka Mezgec (SLO)	Netherlands	Veenendaal

== National, Continental and World champions 2017 ==
Date	Discipline	Jersey	Rider	Country	Location
4 January	Australian National Criterium Championships		Caleb Ewan (AUS)	Australia	Ballarat
9 February	South African National Time Trial Champion		Daryl Impey (RSA)	South Africa	Wellington
25 June	Slovenian National Road Race Champion		Luka Mezgec (SLO)	Slovenia	Kranj
27 June	Canadian National Time Trial Champion		Svein Tuft (CAN)	Canada	Parc de la Gatineau
