= 2017 UCI Oceania Tour =

- Thirteenth edition of the UCI Oceania Tour

Details
- Dates: 22 January 2017–4 March 2017
- Location: Oceania
- Races: 6

The 2017 UCI Oceania Tour is the 13th season of the UCI Oceania Tour. The season began on 22 January 2017 with the New Zealand Cycle Classic and finished on 4 March 2017 with the Continental Championships.

The points leader, based on the cumulative results of previous races, wears the UCI Oceania Tour cycling jersey. Sean Lake from Australia is the defending 2016 UCI Oceania Tour champion.

Throughout the season, points are awarded to the top finishers of stages within stage races and the final general classification standings of each of the stages races and one-day events. The quality and complexity of a race also determines how many points are awarded to the top finishers, the higher the UCI rating of a race, the more points are awarded. The UCI ratings from highest to lowest are as follows:

- Multi-day events: 2.HC, 2.1 and 2.2
- One-day events: 1.HC, 1.1 and 1.2

== Events ==
Date	Race Name	Location	UCI Rating	Winner	Team
22–26 January	New Zealand Cycle Classic	New Zealand	2.2	Joseph Cooper (NZL)	IsoWhey Sports SwissWellness
1–5 February	Herald Sun Tour	Australia	2.1	Damien Howson (AUS)	Orica–Scott
9 March	Oceanian Cycling Championships – Time Trial	Australia	CC	Sean Lake (AUS)	IsoWhey Sports SwissWellness
9 March	Oceanian Cycling Championships – Time Trial U23	Australia	CC	Liam Magennis (AUS)	New South Wales Institute of Sport
11 March	Oceanian Cycling Championships – Road Race	Australia	CC	Sean Lake (AUS)	IsoWhey Sports SwissWellness
11 March	Oceanian Cycling Championships – Road Race U23	Australia	CC	Lucas Hamilton (AUS)	Mitchelton Scott
