= 2017 Bora–Hansgrohe season =

Bora–Hansgrohe
- 2017 season
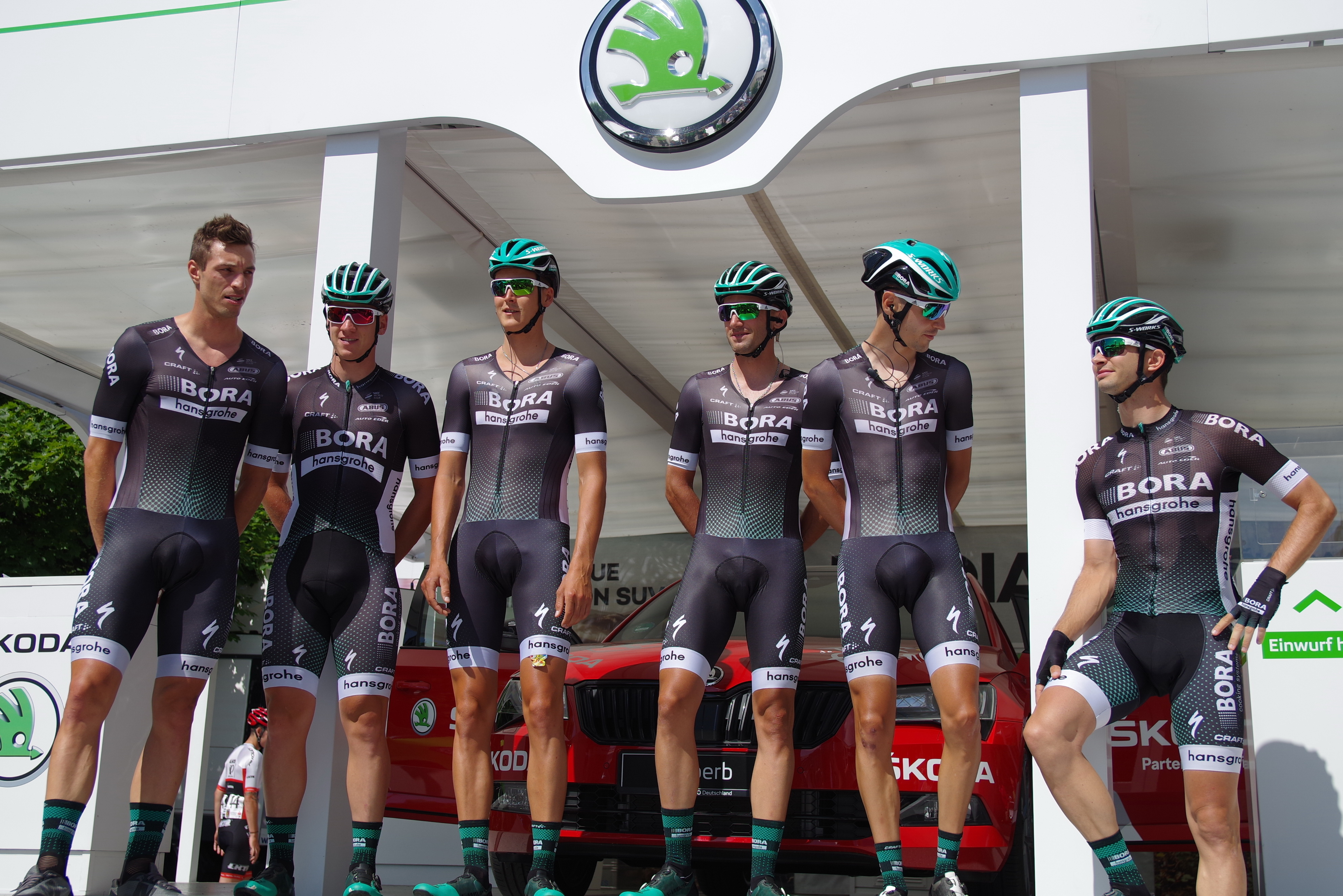
- UCI code: BOH
- Status: UCI WorldTeam
- Manager: Ralph Denk
- Main sponsor(s): BORA & Hansgrohe
- Based: Germany
- Bicycles: Specialized

Season victories
- One-day races: 4
- Stage race overall: 1
- Stage race stages: 23
- World Championships: 1
- National Championships: 5
- Most wins: Peter Sagan (12 wins)
- Best ranked rider: Peter Sagan
- Jersey

The 2017 season for the Bora–Hansgrohe cycling team began in January.

== 2017 roster ==
Rider	Date of birth
Pascal Ackermann (GER)	17 January 1994 (aged 22)
Shane Archbold (NZL)	2 February 1989 (aged 27)
Jan Bárta (CZE)	7 December 1984 (aged 32)
Erik Baška (SVK)	12 January 1994 (aged 22)
Cesare Benedetti (ITA)	3 August 1987 (aged 29)
Sam Bennett (IRL)	16 October 1990 (aged 26)
Maciej Bodnar (POL)	7 March 1985 (aged 31)
Emanuel Buchmann (GER)	18 November 1992 (aged 24)
Marcus Burghardt (GER)	30 June 1983 (aged 33)
Silvio Herklotz (GER)	5 June 1994 (aged 22)
Michael Kolář (SVK)	21 November 1992 (aged 24)
Leopold König (CZE)	15 November 1987 (aged 29)
Patrick Konrad (AUT)	13 October 1991 (aged 25)
Rafał Majka (POL)	12 September 1989 (aged 27)

Rider	Date of birth
Jay McCarthy (AUS)	8 September 1992 (aged 24)
José Mendes (POR)	24 April 1985 (aged 31)
Gregor Mühlberger (AUT)	4 April 1994 (aged 22)
Matteo Pelucchi (ITA)	21 January 1989 (aged 27)
Christoph Pfingsten (GER)	20 November 1987 (aged 29)
Paweł Poljański (POL)	6 May 1990 (aged 26)
Lukas Pöstlberger (AUT)	10 January 1992 (aged 24)
Juraj Sagan (SVK)	23 December 1988 (aged 28)
Peter Sagan (SVK)	26 January 1990 (aged 26)
Aleksejs Saramotins (LAT)	8 April 1982 (aged 34)
Andreas Schillinger (GER)	13 July 1983 (aged 33)
Michael Schwarzmann (GER)	7 January 1991 (aged 25)
Rüdiger Selig (GER)	19 February 1989 (aged 27)

Riders who joined the team for the 2017 season

Rider	2016 team
Pascal Ackermann	Rad-Net Rose Team
Erik Baška	Tinkoff
Maciej Bodnar	Tinkoff
Marcus Burghardt	BMC Racing Team
Michael Kolář	Tinkoff
Leopold König	Team Sky
Rafał Majka	Tinkoff
Jay McCarthy	Tinkoff
Matteo Pelucchi	IAM Cycling
Paweł Poljański	Tinkoff
Juraj Sagan	Tinkoff
Peter Sagan	Tinkoff
Aleksejs Saramotins	IAM Cycling

Riders who left the team during or after the 2016 season

Rider	2017 team
Phil Bauhaus	Team Sunweb
Zak Dempster	Israel Cycling Academy
Bartosz Huzarski	Retired
Ralf Matzka	Retired
Dominik Nerz	Retired
Scott Thwaites	Team Dimension Data
Paul Voss	Retired

== Season victories ==
Date	Race	Competition	Rider	Country	Location
26 February	Kuurne–Brussels–Kuurne	UCI Europe Tour	Peter Sagan (SVK)	Belgium	Kuurne
7 March	Paris–Nice, Stage 3	UCI World Tour	Sam Bennett (IRL)	France	Chalon-sur-Saône
10 March	Tirreno–Adriatico, Stage 3	UCI World Tour	Peter Sagan (SVK)	Italy	Montalto di Castro
12 March	Tirreno–Adriatico, Stage 5	UCI World Tour	Peter Sagan (SVK)	Italy	Fermo
14 March	Tirreno–Adriatico, Points classification	UCI World Tour	Peter Sagan (SVK)	Italy	
21 April	Tour of the Alps, Sprints classification	UCI Europe Tour	Pascal Ackermann (GER)	Austria; Italy	
5 May	Giro d'Italia, Stage 1	UCI World Tour	Lukas Pöstlberger (AUT)	Italy	Olbia
15 May	Tour of California, Stage 2	UCI World Tour	Rafał Majka (POL)	United States	San Jose
16 May	Tour of California, Stage 3	UCI World Tour	Peter Sagan (SVK)	United States	Morro Bay
20 May	Tour of California, Points classification	UCI World Tour	Peter Sagan (SVK)	United States	
11 June	Critérium du Dauphiné, Youth classification	UCI World Tour	Emanuel Buchmann (GER)	France	
11 June	Rund um Köln	UCI Europe Tour	Gregor Mühlberger (AUT)	Germany	Cologne
14 June	Tour de Suisse, Stage 5	UCI World Tour	Peter Sagan (SVK)	Switzerland	Cevio
15 June	Tour of Slovenia, Stage 1	UCI Europe Tour	Sam Bennett (IRL)	Slovenia	Kočevje
17 June	Tour of Slovenia, Stage 3	UCI Europe Tour	Rafał Majka (POL)	Slovenia	Rogla
17 June	Tour de Suisse, Stage 8	UCI World Tour	Peter Sagan (SVK)	Switzerland	Schaffhausen
18 June	Tour of Slovenia, Stage 4	UCI Europe Tour	Sam Bennett (IRL)	Slovenia	Novo Mesto
18 June	Tour of Slovenia, Overall	UCI Europe Tour	Rafał Majka (POL)	Slovenia	
18 June	Tour of Slovenia, Points classification	UCI Europe Tour	Sam Bennett (IRL)	Slovenia	
18 June	Tour of Slovenia, Mountains classification	UCI Europe Tour	Rafał Majka (POL)	Slovenia	
18 June	Tour de Suisse, Points classification	UCI World Tour	Peter Sagan (SVK)	Switzerland	
3 July	Tour de France, Stage 3	UCI World Tour	Peter Sagan (SVK)	France	Longwy
22 July	Tour de France, Stage 20	UCI World Tour	Maciej Bodnar (POL)	France	Marseille
29 July	Tour de Pologne, Stage 1	UCI World Tour	Peter Sagan (SVK)	Poland	Kraków
4 August	Tour de Pologne, Points classification	UCI World Tour	Peter Sagan (SVK)	Poland	
7 August	BinckBank Tour, Stage 1	UCI World Tour	Peter Sagan (SVK)	Netherlands	Venray
9 August	BinckBank Tour, Stage 3	UCI World Tour	Peter Sagan (SVK)	Belgium	Ardooie
11 August	Czech Cycling Tour, Stage 2	UCI Europe Tour	Sam Bennett (IRL)	Czech Republic	Frýdek-Místek
13 August	Czech Cycling Tour, Stage 4	UCI Europe Tour	Sam Bennett (IRL)	Czech Republic	Dolany
13 August	Czech Cycling Tour, Points classification	UCI Europe Tour	Sam Bennett (IRL)	Czech Republic	
13 August	Czech Cycling Tour, Teams classification	UCI Europe Tour	(Note: The riders on the squad were Jan Bárta, Juraj Sagan, Sam Bennett, Silvio Herklotz, Pascal Ackermann, José Mendes, Erik Baška and Michael Schwarzmann)	Czech Republic	
13 August	BinckBank Tour, Sprints classification	UCI World Tour	Peter Sagan (SVK)	Belgium; Netherlands	
2 September	Vuelta a España, Stage 14	UCI World Tour	Rafał Majka (POL)	Spain	Sierra de La Pandera
8 September	Grand Prix Cycliste de Québec	UCI World Tour	Peter Sagan (SVK)	Canada	Québec
3 October	Münsterland Giro	UCI Europe Tour	Sam Bennett (IRL)	Germany	Münster
10 October	Presidential Tour of Turkey, Stage 1	UCI World Tour	Sam Bennett (IRL)	Turkey	Kemer
11 October	Presidential Tour of Turkey, Stage 2	UCI World Tour	Sam Bennett (IRL)	Turkey	Fethiye
12 October	Presidential Tour of Turkey, Stage 3	UCI World Tour	Sam Bennett (IRL)	Turkey	Marmaris
14 October	Presidential Tour of Turkey, Stage 5	UCI World Tour	Sam Bennett (IRL)	Turkey	İzmir

== National, Continental and World champions 2017 ==
Date	Discipline	Jersey	Rider	Country	Location
21 June	Latvian National Time Trial Champion		Aleksejs Saramotins (LAT)	Latvia	Baldone
23 June	Czech National Time Trial Champion		Jan Bárta (CZE)	Slovakia	Žiar nad Hronom
25 June	Austrian National Road Race Champion		Gregor Mühlberger (AUT)	Austria	Grein
25 June	German National Road Race Champion		Marcus Burghardt (GER)	Germany	Chemnitz
25 June	Slovak National Road Race Champion		Juraj Sagan (SVK)	Slovakia	Žiar nad Hronom
24 September	World Road Race Champion		Peter Sagan (SVK)	Norway	Bergen
