= 2016 Continental Cycling Championships =

The 2016 Continental Cycling Championships covers all road and off-road cycling disciplines split by their respective Continental confederation.

== African continental champions ==
Discipline	Men's Champion	Women's Champion
Road	(Eritrea) Issak Okubamariam Tesfom	(Namibia) Vera Adrian
Time Trial	(Morocco) Mouhssine Lahsaini	(Namibia) Vera Adrian
Team Time Trial	Eritrea	South Africa
Downhill		
XC	(South Africa) Philip Buys	(South Africa) Mariske Strauss
XCE		
Marathon	(Mauritius) Yannick Lincoln	(South Africa) Amy McDougall
Cyclocross		

== American continental champions ==
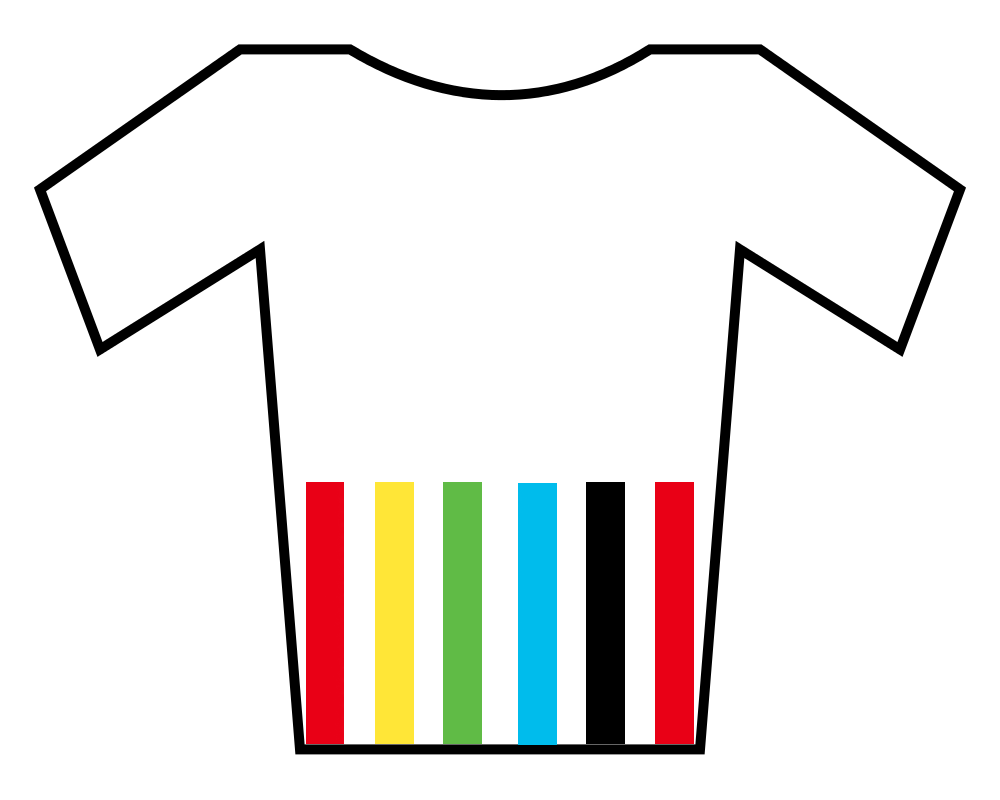
The Pan-American continental championship jersey.

Discipline	Men's Champion	Women's Champion
Road		
Time Trial		
Downhill		
XC		
XCE		
Cyclocross	(United States) Stephen Hyde	(United States) Katie Compton

== Asian continental champions ==
Discipline	Men's Champion	Women's Champion
Road		
Time Trial	(Hong Kong) King Lok Cheung	(Japan) Mayuko Hagiwara
Downhill	(Japan) Kazuki Shimizu	(Thailand) Vipavee Deekaballes
XC		(China) Chengyuan Ren
XCE	(Thailand) Keerati Sukprasart	(Thailand) Warinothorn Phetpraphan
Cyclocross		

== European continental champions ==
The European continental championship jersey.

Discipline	Men's Champion	Women's Champion
Road		
Time Trial		
Downhill		
XC	(France) Julien Absalon	(Switzerland) Jolanda Neff
XCE	(Sweden) Emil Linde	(Ukraine) Iryna Popova
Marathon	(Estonia) Peeter Pruus	(United Kingdom) Sally Bigham
Cyclocross	(Netherlands) Mathieu van der Poel	(Belgium) Sanne Cant

== Oceanian continental champions ==
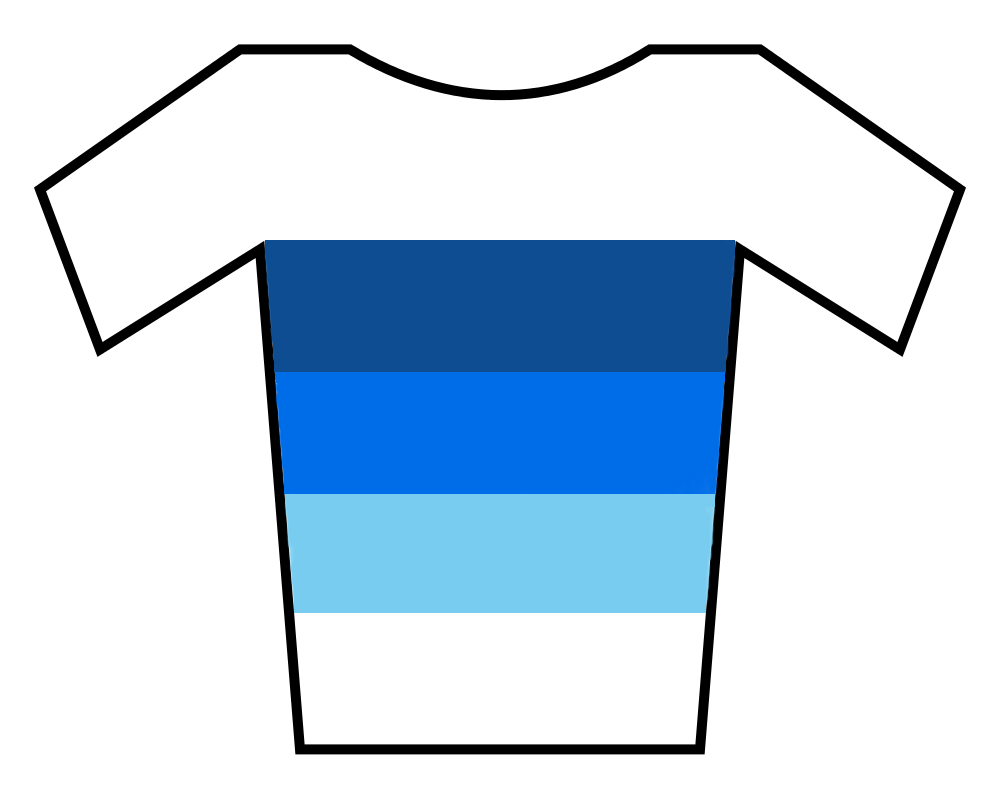
The Oceania continental championship jersey.

Discipline	Men's Champion	Women's Champion
Road	(Australia) Sean Lake	(Australia) Shannon Malseed
Time Trial	(Australia) Sean Lake	(Australia) Katrin Garfoot
Downhill		
XC	(New Zealand) Anton Cooper	(Australia) Rebecca Henderson
XCE	(New Zealand) Eden Cruise	
Cyclocross		

== See also ==
- Oceania Cycling Championships
- African Continental Cycling Championships
