= 2017 Quick-Step Floors season =

Quick-Step Floors
- 2017 season
- UCI code: QST
- Status: UCI ProTeam
- Manager: Patrick Lefevere
- Main sponsor(s): Quick-Step
- Based: Belgium
- Bicycles: Specialized
- Groupset: Shimano

Season victories
- One-day races: 8
- Stage race overall: 2
- Stage race stages: 42
- National Championships: 4

The 2017 season for Quick-Step Floors began in January at the Tour Down Under. As a UCI WorldTeam, they were automatically invited and obliged to send a squad to every event in the UCI World Tour.

== 2017 roster ==
Rider	Date of birth
Julian Alaphilippe (FRA)	11 June 1992 (age 33)
Jack Bauer (NZL)	7 April 1985 (age 40)
Tom Boonen (Note: Boonen retired from cycling on 9 April.) (BEL)	15 October 1980 (age 45)
Gianluca Brambilla (ITA)	22 August 1987 (age 38)
Eros Capecchi (ITA)	13 June 1986 (age 39)
Rémi Cavagna (FRA)	10 August 1995 (age 30)
Laurens De Plus (BEL)	4 September 1995 (age 30)
David de la Cruz (ESP)	6 May 1989 (age 36)
Tim Declercq (BEL)	21 March 1989 (age 36)
Dries Devenyns (BEL)	22 July 1983 (age 42)
Fernando Gaviria (COL)	19 August 1994 (age 31)
Philippe Gilbert (BEL)	5 July 1982 (age 43)
Bob Jungels (LUX)	22 September 1992 (age 33)
Iljo Keisse (BEL)	21 December 1982 (age 43)
Marcel Kittel (GER)	11 May 1988 (age 37)

Rider	Date of birth
Yves Lampaert (BEL)	10 April 1991 (age 34)
Dan Martin (IRL)	20 August 1986 (age 39)
Davide Martinelli (ITA)	31 May 1993 (age 32)
Enric Mas (ESP)	7 January 1995 (age 31)
Maximiliano Richeze (ARG)	7 March 1983 (age 43)
Fabio Sabatini (ITA)	10 February 1985 (age 41)
Maximilian Schachmann (GER)	9 January 1994 (age 32)
Pieter Serry (BEL)	21 November 1988 (age 37)
Zdeněk Štybar (CZE)	11 December 1985 (age 40)
Niki Terpstra (NED)	18 May 1984 (age 41)
Matteo Trentin (ITA)	2 August 1989 (age 36)
Petr Vakoč (CZE)	11 July 1992 (age 33)
Martin Velits (SVK)	21 February 1985 (age 41)
Julien Vermote (BEL)	26 July 1989 (age 36)

Riders who joined the team for the 2017 season

Rider	2016 team
Jack Bauer	Cannondale–Drapac
Eros Capecchi	Astana
Rémi Cavagna	neo-pro (Klein Constantia)
Tim Declercq	Topsport Vlaanderen–Baloise
Dries Devenyns	IAM Cycling
Philippe Gilbert	BMC Racing Team
Enric Mas	neo-pro (Klein Constantia)
Maximilian Schachmann	neo-pro (Klein Constantia)

Riders who left the team during or after the 2016 season

Rider	2017 team
Maxime Bouet	Fortuneo–Vital Concept
Rodrigo Contreras	Coldeportes–Zenú
Nikolas Maes	Lotto–Soudal
Tony Martin	Team Katusha–Alpecin
Gianni Meersman	Retired
Guillaume Van Keirsbulck	Wanty–Groupe Gobert
Stijn Vandenbergh	AG2R La Mondiale
Łukasz Wiśniowski	Team Sky

== Season victories ==
As of 28 May

Date	Race	Competition	Rider	Country	Location
23 January	Vuelta a San Juan, Stage 1	UCI America Tour	Fernando Gaviria (COL)	Argentina	San Juan
24 January	Vuelta a San Juan, Stage 2	UCI America Tour	Tom Boonen (BEL)	Argentina	San Juan
26 January	Vuelta a San Juan, Stage 4	UCI America Tour	Fernando Gaviria (COL)	Argentina	San Juan
28 January	Vuelta a San Juan, Stage 6	UCI America Tour	Maximiliano Richeze (ARG)	Argentina	Pocito
29 January	Vuelta a San Juan, Stage 7	UCI America Tour	Maximiliano Richeze (ARG)	Argentina	San Juan
31 January	Dubai Tour, Stage 1	UCI Asia Tour	Marcel Kittel (GER)	United Arab Emirates	Dubai
1 February	Dubai Tour, Stage 2	UCI Asia Tour	Marcel Kittel (GER)	United Arab Emirates	Ras Al Khaimah
4 February	Dubai Tour, Stage 5	UCI Asia Tour	Marcel Kittel (GER)	United Arab Emirates	Dubai
4 February	Dubai Tour, Overall	UCI Asia Tour	Marcel Kittel (GER)	United Arab Emirates	
4 February	Dubai Tour, Points classification	UCI Asia Tour	Marcel Kittel (GER)	United Arab Emirates	
15 February	Volta ao Algarve, Stage 1	UCI Europe Tour	Fernando Gaviria (COL)	Portugal	Lagos
16 February	Volta ao Algarve, Stage 2	UCI Europe Tour	Dan Martin (IRL)	Portugal	Alto da Fóia
24 February	Abu Dhabi Tour, Stage 2	UCI World Tour	Marcel Kittel (GER)	United Arab Emirates	Abu Dhabi
26 February	Abu Dhabi Tour, Youth classification	UCI World Tour	Julian Alaphilippe (FRA)	United Arab Emirates	
8 March	Paris–Nice, Stage 4	UCI World Tour	Julian Alaphilippe (FRA)	France	Rhône
12 March	Paris–Nice, Stage 8	UCI World Tour	David de la Cruz (ESP)	France	Nice
12 March	Paris–Nice, Points classification	UCI World Tour	Julian Alaphilippe (FRA)	France	
12 March	Paris–Nice, Youth classification	UCI World Tour	Julian Alaphilippe (FRA)	France	
12 March	Paris–Nice, Teams classification	UCI World Tour	(Note: The riders on the squad were Dan Martin, Julian Alaphilippe, Jack Bauer, David de la Cruz, Philippe Gilbert, Marcel Kittel, Yves Lampaert and Fabio Sabatini)	France	
13 March	Tirreno–Adriatico, Stage 6	UCI World Tour	Fernando Gaviria (COL)	Italy	Macerata
14 March	Tirreno–Adriatico, Youth classification	UCI World Tour	Bob Jungels (LUX)	Italy	
22 March	Dwars Door Vlaanderen	UCI World Tour	Yves Lampaert (BEL)	Belgium	Waregem
28 March	Three Days of De Panne, Stage 1	UCI Europe Tour	Philippe Gilbert (BEL)	Belgium	Zottegem
30 March	Three Days of De Panne, Stage 3a	UCI Europe Tour	Marcel Kittel (GER)	Belgium	De Panne
30 March	Three Days of De Panne, Overall	UCI Europe Tour	Philippe Gilbert (BEL)	Belgium	
30 March	Three Days of De Panne, Sprints classification	UCI Europe Tour	Philippe Gilbert (BEL)	Belgium	
2 April	Tour of Flanders	UCI World Tour	Philippe Gilbert (BEL)	Belgium	Oudenaarde
5 April	Scheldeprijs	UCI Europe Tour	Marcel Kittel (GER)	Belgium	Schoten
5 April	Tour of the Basque Country, Stage 3	UCI World Tour	David de la Cruz (ESP)	Spain	San Sebastián
16 April	Amstel Gold Race	UCI World Tour	Philippe Gilbert (BEL)	Netherlands	Berg en Terblijt
7 May	Giro d'Italia, Stage 3	UCI World Tour	Fernando Gaviria (COL)	Italy	Cagliari
10 May	Giro d'Italia, Stage 5	UCI World Tour	Fernando Gaviria (COL)	Italy	Messina
14 May	Tour of California, Stage 1	UCI World Tour	Marcel Kittel (GER)	United States	Sacramento
18 May	Giro d'Italia, Stage 12	UCI World Tour	Fernando Gaviria (COL)	Italy	Reggio Emilia
19 May	Giro d'Italia, Stage 13	UCI World Tour	Fernando Gaviria (COL)	Italy	Tortona
21 May	Giro d'Italia, Stage 15	UCI World Tour	Bob Jungels (LUX)	Italy	Bergamo
28 May	Giro d'Italia, Points classification	UCI World Tour	Fernando Gaviria (COL)	Italy	
28 May	Giro d'Italia, Youth classification	UCI World Tour	Bob Jungels (LUX)	Italy	
28 May	Tour of Belgium, Teams classification	UCI Europe Tour	(Note: The riders on the squad were Philippe Gilbert, Rémi Cavagna, Tim Declercq, Petr Vakoč, Yves Lampaert, Niki Terpstra and Julien Vermote)	Belgium	
11 June	Tour de Suisse, Stage 2	UCI World Tour	Philippe Gilbert (BEL)	Switzerland	Cham
18 June	Ster ZLM Toer, Stage 4	UCI Europe Tour	Marcel Kittel (GER)	Netherlands	Oss
18 June	Ster ZLM Toer, Teams classification	UCI Europe Tour	(Note: The riders on the squad were Maximilian Schachmann, Rémi Cavagna, Laurens De Plus, Iljo Keisse, Fabio Sabatini, Marcel Kittel and Niki Terpstra)	Netherlands	
2 July	Tour de France, Stage 2	UCI World Tour	Marcel Kittel (GER)	Belgium	Liège
6 July	Tour de France, Stage 6	UCI World Tour	Marcel Kittel (GER)	France	Troyes
7 July	Tour de France, Stage 7	UCI World Tour	Marcel Kittel (GER)	France	Nuits-Saint-Georges
11 July	Tour de France, Stage 10	UCI World Tour	Marcel Kittel (GER)	France	Bergerac
12 July	Tour de France, Stage 11	UCI World Tour	Marcel Kittel (GER)	France	Pau
2 August	Vuelta a Burgos, Stage 2	UCI Europe Tour	Matteo Trentin (ITA)	Spain	Belorado
5 August	Vuelta a Burgos, Youth classification	UCI Europe Tour	Enric Mas (ESP)	Spain	
20 August	Vuelta a España, Stage 2	UCI World Tour	Yves Lampaert (BEL)	France	Gruissan
22 August	Vuelta a España, Stage 4	UCI World Tour	Matteo Trentin (ITA)	Spain	Tarragona
26 August	Omloop Mandel-Leie-Schelde Meulebeke	UCI Europe Tour	Iljo Keisse (BEL)	Belgium	Meulebeke
26 August	Vuelta a España, Stage 8	UCI World Tour	Julian Alaphilippe (FRA)	Spain	Xorret de Catí
29 August	Vuelta a España, Stage 10	UCI World Tour	Matteo Trentin (ITA)	Spain	Alhama de Murcia
1 September	Vuelta a España, Stage 13	UCI World Tour	Matteo Trentin (ITA)	Spain	Tomares
6 September	Tour of Britain, Stage 4	UCI Europe Tour	Fernando Gaviria (COL)	United Kingdom	Newark-on-Trent
10 September	Vuelta a España, Stage 21	UCI World Tour	Matteo Trentin (ITA)	Spain	Madrid
15 September	Kampioenschap van Vlaanderen	UCI Europe Tour	Fernando Gaviria (COL)	Belgium	Ardooie-Koolskamp
16 September	Primus Classic	UCI Europe Tour	Matteo Trentin (ITA)	Belgium	Boortmeerbeek
8 October	Paris–Tours	UCI Europe Tour	Matteo Trentin (ITA)	France	Tours
19 October	Tour of Guangxi – Stage 1	UCI World Tour	Fernando Gaviria (COL)	China	Beihai
20 October	Tour of Guangxi – Stage 2	UCI World Tour	Fernando Gaviria (COL)	China	Nanning
21 October	Tour of Guangxi – Stage 3	UCI World Tour	Fernando Gaviria (COL)	China	Nanning
24 October	Tour of Guangxi – Stage 6	UCI World Tour	Fernando Gaviria (COL)	China	Guilin

== National, Continental and World champions ==
Date	Discipline	Jersey	Rider	Country	Location
6 January	New Zealand National Time Trial Champion		Jack Bauer (NZL)	New Zealand	Napier
22 June	Belgian National Time Trial Champion		Yves Lampaert (BEL)	Belgium	Chimay
25 June	Czech National Road Race Champion		Zdeněk Štybar (CZE)	Slovakia	Žiar nad Hronom
25 June	Luxembourgish National Road Race Champion		Bob Jungels (LUX)	Luxembourg	
