= Tim Roe =

Australian professional road cyclist (born 1989)

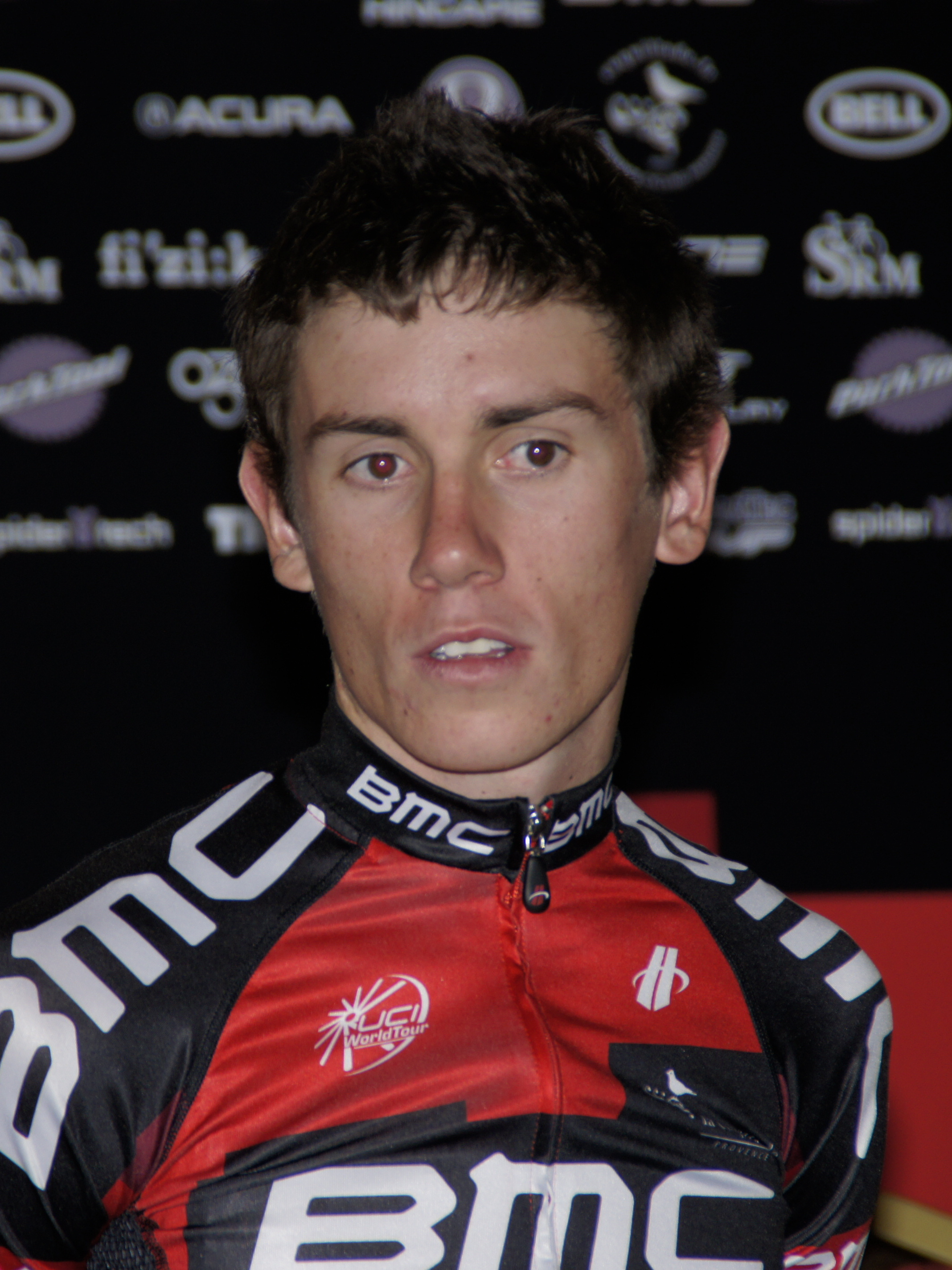
- Roe in 2011

Personal information
- Full name: Timothy Roe
- Nickname: Tim
- Born: 28 October 1989 (age 36) Adelaide, Australia
- Height: 1.82 m (5 ft 11 1/2 in)
- Weight: 66 kg (146 lb)

Cycling career
- Sport: Cycling
- Discipline: Road
- Role: Rider

Amateur teams
- 2008–2009: Savings & Loans Cycling Team
- 2010: Trek–Livestrong

Professional teams
- 2011–2012: BMC Racing Team
- 2013: BMC Development Team
- 2014: Team Budget Forklifts
- 2015–2016: Drapac Professional Cycling
- 2017–2018: IsoWhey Sports SwissWellness

Timothy Roe (born 28 October 1989) is a former Australian professional road cyclist.

== Major results ==
2009
1st Overall Jelajah Malaysia

1st Stage 7

3rd Overall Tour de Korea

1st Stages 6 & 7

3rd Overall Tour of Wellington
2010
2nd Overall Thüringen Rundfahrt der U23
6th Overall Olympia's Tour
2011
10th Road Race, National Road Championships
2013
1st Romsée–Stavelot–Romsée
2014
1st Overall Tour of Gippsland
1st Stage 2 Tour de Perth
3rd Overall Tour of Tasmania
8th Overall Tour de Beauce
2017
6th Overall Tour of Japan
8th Overall New Zealand Cycle Classic

1st Stage 1

9th Overall Tour de Langkawi
10th Overall Herald Sun Tour
2018
5th Overall Le Tour de Savoie Mont Blanc
2021
9th Road Race, National Road Championships
