= 2017 in men's road cycling =

2017 in men's road cycling is about the 2017 men's bicycle races governed by the UCI.

== UCI World Ranking ==
In 2016, the UCI launched a new ranking system for men's road racing. This ranking will continue in 2017.

=== Year-end ranking ===
UCI World Rankings (Individual), as of 24 October 2017
Rank	Rider	Team	Points
1	Greg Van Avermaet (BEL)	BMC Racing Team	4153
2	Chris Froome (GBR)	Team Sky	3692
3	Peter Sagan (SVK)	Bora–Hansgrohe	3344
4	Alexander Kristoff (NOR)	Team Katusha–Alpecin	2973
5	Tom Dumoulin (NED)	Team Sunweb	2966
6	Vincenzo Nibali (ITA)	Bahrain–Merida	2702
7	Alejandro Valverde (ESP)	Movistar Team	2648
8	Michał Kwiatkowski (POL)	Team Sky	2530
9	Michael Matthews (AUS)	Team Sunweb	2479
10	Philippe Gilbert (BEL)	Quick-Step Floors	2293

UCI World Rankings (Nations), as of 24 October 2017
Rank	Nation	Points
1	Belgium	14605
2	Italy	14066
3	France	12193
4	Spain	10567
5	Netherlands	10309
6	Colombia	9897
7	Australia	8816
8	Great Britain	8592
9	Germany	6453
10	Norway	6110

== World Championships ==
The World Road Championships is set to be held in Bergen, Norway, from 17 to 24 September 2017.

Events at the 2017 UCI Road World Championships
Race	Date	Winner	Second	Third	Ref
World Championship Team Time Trial	September 17	(Germany) Team Sunweb	(United States) BMC Racing Team	(United Kingdom) Team Sky	
World Championship Time Trial	September 20	Tom Dumoulin (NED)	Primož Roglič (SLO)	Chris Froome (GBR)	
World Championship Road Race	September 24	Peter Sagan (SVK)	Alexander Kristoff (NOR)	Michael Matthews (AUS)	

== Grand Tours ==
Grand Tours in the 2017 season
Race	Date	Winner	Second	Third	Ref
(Italy) Giro d'Italia	May 6–28	Tom Dumoulin (NED)	Nairo Quintana (COL)	Vincenzo Nibali (ITA)	
Tour de France	July 1–23	Chris Froome (GBR)	Rigoberto Urán (COL)	Romain Bardet (FRA)	
(Spain) Vuelta a España	August 19 – September 10	Chris Froome (GBR)	Vincenzo Nibali (ITA)	Ilnur Zakarin (RUS)	

== UCI World Tour ==
For the 2017 season, the UCI added ten new events to the World Tour calendar.

Race	Date	Winner	Second	Third	Ref
(Australia) Santos Tour Down Under	17–22 January	Richie Porte (AUS)	Esteban Chaves (COL)	Jay McCarthy (AUS)	
(Australia) Cadel Evans Great Ocean Road Race	29 January	Nikias Arndt (GER)	Simon Gerrans (AUS)	Cameron Meyer (AUS)	
(United Arab Emirates) Abu Dhabi Tour	23–26 February	Rui Costa (POR)	Ilnur Zakarin (RUS)	Tom Dumoulin (NED)	
(Belgium) Omloop Het Nieuwsblad	25 February	Greg Van Avermaet (BEL)	Peter Sagan (SVK)	Sep Vanmarcke (BEL)	
(Italy) Strade Bianche	4 March	Michał Kwiatkowski (POL)	Greg Van Avermaet (BEL)	Tim Wellens (BEL)	
(France) Paris–Nice	5–12 March	Sergio Henao (COL)	Alberto Contador (ESP)	Dan Martin (IRL)	
(Italy) Tirreno–Adriatico	8–14 March	Nairo Quintana (COL)	Rohan Dennis (AUS)	Thibaut Pinot (FRA)	
(Italy) Milan–San Remo	18 March	Michał Kwiatkowski (POL)	Peter Sagan (SVK)	Julian Alaphilippe (FRA)	
(Spain) Volta Ciclista a Catalunya	20–26 March	Alejandro Valverde (ESP)	Alberto Contador (ESP)	Marc Soler (ESP)	
(Belgium) Dwars door Vlaanderen	22 March	Yves Lampaert (BEL)	Philippe Gilbert (BEL)	Alexey Lutsenko (KAZ)	
(Belgium) Record Bank E3 Harelbeke	24 March	Greg Van Avermaet (BEL)	Philippe Gilbert (BEL)	Oliver Naesen (BEL)	
(Belgium) Gent–Wevelgem	26 March	Greg Van Avermaet (BEL)	Jens Keukeleire (BEL)	Peter Sagan (SVK)	
(Belgium) Ronde van Vlaanderen	2 April	Philippe Gilbert (BEL)	Greg Van Avermaet (BEL)	Niki Terpstra (NED)	
(Spain) Vuelta al País Vasco	3–8 April	Alejandro Valverde (ESP)	Alberto Contador (ESP)	Ion Izagirre (ESP)	
(France) Paris–Roubaix	9 April	Greg Van Avermaet (BEL)	Zdeněk Štybar (CZE)	Sebastian Langeveld (NED)	
(Netherlands) Amstel Gold Race	16 April	Philippe Gilbert (BEL)	Michał Kwiatkowski (POL)	Michael Albasini (SUI)	
(Belgium) La Flèche Wallonne	19 April	Alejandro Valverde (ESP)	Dan Martin (IRL)	Dylan Teuns (BEL)	
(Belgium) Liège–Bastogne–Liège	23 April	Alejandro Valverde (ESP)	Dan Martin (IRL)	Michał Kwiatkowski (POL)	
(Switzerland) Tour de Romandie	25–30 April	Richie Porte (AUS)	Simon Yates (GBR)	Primož Roglič (SLO)	
(Germany) Eschborn–Frankfurt – Rund um den Finanzplatz	1 May	Alexander Kristoff (NOR)	Rick Zabel (GER)	John Degenkolb (GER)	
(United States) Amgen Tour of California	14-21 May	George Bennett (NZL)	Rafał Majka (POL)	Andrew Talansky (USA)	
(France) Critérium du Dauphiné	4–11 June	Jakob Fuglsang (DEN)	Richie Porte (AUS)	Dan Martin (IRL)	
(Switzerland) Tour de Suisse	10–18 June	Simon Špilak (SLO)	Damiano Caruso (ITA)	Steven Kruijswijk (NED)	
(Spain) Clásica Ciclista San Sebastián	29 July	Michał Kwiatkowski (POL)	Tony Gallopin (FRA)	Bauke Mollema (NED)	
(Poland) Tour de Pologne	29 July – 4 August	Dylan Teuns (BEL)	Rafał Majka (POL)	Wout Poels (NED)	
(United Kingdom) Prudential RideLondon–Surrey Classic	30 July	Alexander Kristoff (NOR)	Magnus Cort (DEN)	Michael Matthews (AUS)	
(Belgium) (Netherlands) BinckBank Tour	7–13 August	Tom Dumoulin (NED)	Tim Wellens (BEL)	Jasper Stuyven (BEL)	
(Germany) Cyclassics Hamburg	20 August	Elia Viviani (ITA)	Arnaud Démare (FRA)	Dylan Groenewegen (NED)	
Bretagne Classic Ouest-France	27 August	Elia Viviani (ITA)	Alexander Kristoff (NOR)	Sonny Colbrelli (ITA)	
(Canada) Grand Prix Cycliste de Québec	8 September	Peter Sagan (SVK)	Greg Van Avermaet (BEL)	Michael Matthews (AUS)	
(Canada) Grand Prix Cycliste de Montréal	10 September	Diego Ulissi (ITA)	Jesús Herrada (ESP)	Tom-Jelte Slagter (NED)	
(Italy) Il Lombardia	7 October	Vincenzo Nibali (ITA)	Julian Alaphilippe (FRA)	Gianni Moscon (ITA)	
Presidential Cycling Tour of Turkey	10–15 October	Diego Ulissi (ITA)	Jesper Hansen (DEN)	Fausto Masnada (ITA)	
(China) Tour of Guangxi	19-24 October	Tim Wellens (BEL)	Bauke Mollema (NED)	Nicolas Roche (IRL)	

== UCI tours ==
Tour	Individual champion	Team champion	Nations champion
World Tour	Greg Van Avermaet (BEL) (BMC Racing Team)	Team Sky	No nation ranking
Africa Tour	Willie Smit (RSA)	Bike Aid	Eritrea
America Tour	Serghei Țvetcov (ROU) (Jelly Belly–Maxxis)	Rally Cycling	Colombia
Asia Tour	Mauricio Ortega (COL) (RTS–Monton Racing Team)	Team Ukyo	Kazakhstan
Europe Tour	Nacer Bouhanni (FRA) (Cofidis)	Wanty–Groupe Gobert	France
Oceania Tour	Lucas Hamilton (AUS) (Mitchelton Scott)	Mitchelton Scott	Australia

== 2.HC Category Races ==
Race	Date	Winner	Second	Third	Ref
(United Arab Emirates) Dubai Tour	January 31 – February 4	Marcel Kittel (GER)	Dylan Groenewegen (NED)	John Degenkolb (GER)	
Tour of Oman	February 14–19	Ben Hermans (BEL)	Rui Costa (POR)	Fabio Aru (ITA)	
(Spain) Vuelta a Andalucía Ruta Ciclista del Sol	February 15–19	Alejandro Valverde (ESP)	Alberto Contador (ESP)	Thibaut Pinot (FRA)	
(Portugal) Volta ao Algarve em Bicicleta	February 15–19	Primož Roglič (SLO)	Michał Kwiatkowski (POL)	Tony Gallopin (FRA)	
(Malaysia) Le Tour de Langkawi	February 22 – March 1	Ryan Gibbons (RSA)	Cameron Bayly (AUS)	Alberto Cecchin (ITA)	
(Belgium) Three Days of De Panne	March 28–30	Philippe Gilbert (BEL)	Matthias Brändle (AUT)	Alexander Kristoff (NOR)	
(Italy) Tour of the Alps	April 17–21	Geraint Thomas (GBR)	Thibaut Pinot (FRA)	Domenico Pozzovivo (ITA)	
(France) Four Days of Dunkirk	May 9–14	Clément Venturini (FRA)	Sander Armée (BEL)	Oliver Naesen (BEL)	
Tour of Norway	May 17–21	Edvald Boasson Hagen (NOR)	Simon Gerrans (AUS)	Pieter Weening (NED)	
Baloise Belgium Tour	May 24–28	Jens Keukeleire (BEL)	Rémi Cavagna (FRA)	Tony Martin (GER)	
Tour de Luxembourg	May 31 – June 4	Greg Van Avermaet (BEL)	Xandro Meurisse (BEL)	Anthony Perez (FRA)	
(China) Tour of Qinghai Lake	July 16–29	Yonathan Monsalve (VEN)	Mauricio Ortega (COL)	Björn Thurau (GER)	
(Belgium) VOO-Tour de Wallonie	July 22–26	Dylan Teuns (BEL)	Tosh Van der Sande (BEL)	Benjamin Thomas (FRA)	
(United States) The Larry H. Miller Tour of Utah	July 31 – August 6	Rob Britton (CAN)	Gavin Mannion (USA)	Serghei Țvetcov (ROU)	
(Spain) Vuelta a Burgos	August 1–5	Mikel Landa (ESP)	Enric Mas (ESP)	David de la Cruz (ESP)	
(United States) Colorado Classic	August 10–13	Manuel Senni (ITA)	Serghei Țvetcov (ROU)	Alex Howes (USA)	
Arctic Race of Norway	August 10–13	Dylan Teuns (BEL)	August Jensen (NOR)	Michel Kreder (NED)	
(United Kingdom) Tour of Britain	September 3–10	Lars Boom (NED)	Edvald Boasson Hagen (NOR)	Stefan Küng (SUI)	
(Denmark) PostNord Danmark Rundt	September 12–16	Mads Pedersen (DEN)	Michael Valgren (DEN)	Casper Pedersen (DEN)	
(China) Tour of Hainan	October 28 – November 5	Jacopo Mosca (ITA)	Benjamin Prades (ESP)	Emīls Liepiņš (LAT)	

== 1.HC Category Races ==
Race	Date	Winner	Second	Third	Ref
(Italy) Trofeo Laigueglia	February 12	Fabio Felline (ITA)	Romain Hardy (FRA)	Mauro Finetto (ITA)	
(Belgium) Kuurne–Brussels–Kuurne	February 26	Peter Sagan (SVK)	Jasper Stuyven (BEL)	Luke Rowe (GBR)	
(Italy) GP Industria & Artigianato	March 5	Adam Yates (GBR)	Richard Carapaz (ECU)	Rigoberto Urán (COL)	
(Belgium) Nokere Koerse	March 15	Nacer Bouhanni (FRA)	Adam Blythe (GBR)	Joeri Stallaert (BEL)	
(Belgium) Scheldeprijs	April 5	Marcel Kittel (GER)	Elia Viviani (ITA)	Nacer Bouhanni (FRA)	
(Belgium) Brabantse Pijl	April 12	Sonny Colbrelli (ITA)	Petr Vakoč (CZE)	Tiesj Benoot (BEL)	
(France) GP de Denain	April 13	Arnaud Démare (FRA)	Nacer Bouhanni (FRA)	Juan Sebastián Molano (COL)	
(Switzerland) GP di Lugano	May 7	Iuri Filosi (ITA)	Marco Frapporti (ITA)	Davide Orrico (ITA)	
(Switzerland) GP du canton d'Argovie	June 8	Sacha Modolo (ITA)	John Degenkolb (GER)	Niccolò Bonifazio (ITA)	
(Belgium) Brussels Cycling Classic	September 2	Arnaud Démare (FRA)	Marko Kump (SLO)	André Greipel (GER)	
(France) GP de Fourmies	September 3	Nacer Bouhanni (FRA)	Marc Sarreau (FRA)	Rüdiger Selig (GER)	
(Belgium) Primus Classic	September 16	Matteo Trentin (ITA)	Jempy Drucker (LUX)	André Greipel (GER)	
(Italy) Giro dell'Emilia	September 30	Giovanni Visconti (ITA)	Vincenzo Nibali (ITA)	Rigoberto Urán (COL)	
(Italy) GP Bruno Beghelli	October 1	Luis León Sánchez (ESP)	Sonny Colbrelli (ITA)	Elia Viviani (ITA)	
(Belgium) Tour de l'Eurométropole	October 1	Daniel McLay (GBR)	Kenny Dehaes (BEL)	Anthony Turgis (FRA)	
(Italy) Tre Valli Varesine	October 3	Alexandre Geniez (FRA)	Thibaut Pinot (FRA)	Vincenzo Nibali (ITA)	
(Germany) Sparkassen Münsterland Giro	October 3	Sam Bennett (IRL)	Phil Bauhaus (GER)	André Greipel (GER)	
(Italy) Milano–Torino	October 5	Rigoberto Urán (COL)	Adam Yates (GBR)	Fabio Aru (ITA)	
(France) Paris–Tours	October 8	Matteo Trentin (ITA)	Søren Kragh Andersen (DEN)	Niki Terpstra (NED)	
Japan Cup	October 22	Marco Canola (ITA)	Benjamin Prades (ESP)	Takeaki Amezawa (JPN)	

== Championships ==
=== Continental Championships ===
Championships	Race	Date	Winner	Second	Third	Ref
African Championships; Egypt	Road race	February 19	Willie Smit (RSA)	Meron Abraham (ERI)	Ahmed Amine Galdoune (MAR)	
African Championships; Egypt	Individual time trial	February 16	Meron Teshome (ERI)	Stefan De Bod (RSA)	Awet Habtom (ERI)	
African Championships; Egypt	Team time trial	February 14	Eritrea	Algeria	Rwanda	
Pan American Championships; Dominican Republic	Road race	May 7	Nelson Soto (COL)	José Aguirre (MEX)	Juan Sebastián Molano (COL)	
Pan American Championships; Dominican Republic	Individual time trial	May 5	José Luis Rodríguez Aguilar (CHI)	Rodrigo Contreras (COL)	Manuel Rodas (GUA)	
Asian Championships; Bahrain	Road race	March 2	Park Sang-hong (KOR)	Yousef Mirza (UAE)	Zhandos Bizhigitov (KAZ)	
Asian Championships; Bahrain	Individual time trial	February 27	Dmitriy Gruzdev (KAZ)	Choe Hyeong-min (KOR)	Cheung King Lok (HKG)	
Asian Championships; Bahrain	Team time trial	February 25	Kazakhstan	Japan	Hong Kong	
European Championships; Denmark	Road race	August 6	Alexander Kristoff (NOR)	Elia Viviani (ITA)	Moreno Hofland (NED)	
European Championships; Denmark	Individual time trial	August 3	Victor Campenaerts (BEL)	Maciej Bodnar (POL)	Ryan Mullen (IRL)	
Oceanian Championships; Australia	Road race	March 11	Sean Lake (AUS)	Neil Van der Ploeg (AUS)	Jesse Featonby (AUS)	
Oceanian Championships; Australia	Individual time trial	March 9	Sean Lake (AUS)	Benjamin Dyball (AUS)	Hamish Bond (NZL)	

== UCI Teams ==
=== UCI WorldTeams ===
The UCI has granted a UCI WorldTour licence to the following eighteen teams:

- (France) AG2R La Mondiale
- (Kazakhstan) Astana
- (United States) BMC Racing Team
- (Germany) Bora–Hansgrohe
- (United States) Cannondale–Drapac
- (South Africa) Team Dimension Data
- (Belgium) Quick-Step Floors
- (France) FDJ
- (Belgium) Lotto–Soudal
- (Spain) Movistar Team
- (Australia) Orica–Scott
- Bahrain–Merida
- (Switzerland) Team Katusha–Alpecin
- (Netherlands) LottoNL–Jumbo
- (United Kingdom) Team Sky
- (Germany) Team Sunweb
- (United States) Trek–Segafredo
- (United Arab Emirates) UAE Team Emirates
