= 2017 Herald Sun Tour =

UCI Oceania Tour

Race details
- Dates: 1–5 February 2017
- Stages: 5
- Distance: 630.5 km (391.8 mi)
- Winning time: 15h 25' 13"

Results
Jersey awarded to the overall winner	Winner	Damien Howson (Australia)	(Orica–Scott)
	Second	Jai Hindley (Australia)	(Australia (national team))
	Third	Kenny Elissonde (France)	(Team Sky)
Jersey awarded to the mountains classification winner	Mountains	Ben Hill (Australia)	(Attaque Team Gusto)
Jersey awarded to the youth classification winner	Youth	Jai Hindley (Australia)	(Australia (national team))
Jersey awarded to the sprints classification winner	Sprints	Jacob Kauffmann (Australia)	(New South Wales Institute of Sport)
	Team	Team Sky	

The 2017 Jayco Herald Sun Tour was a road cycling stage race that took place in Victoria, Australia, between 1 and 5 February 2017. The race was rated as a 2.1 event as part of the 2017 UCI Oceania Tour. The race included five stages: the first was a 2.1 km (1.3 mi) prologue individual time trial stage, with the remaining four stages being road stages. The champion of the 2016 Herald Sun Tour, Chris Froome attempted to defend his title.

The race was won by Damien Howson of Orica–Scott, who took his first professional victories at the race; having won the race's queen stage to Falls Creek, Howson was able to maintain a 38-second race lead for the remainder of the Tour. The remaining podium places were taken by those that finished immediately behind Howson at Falls Creek; Jai Hindley finished second for an Australian select team, and took out the white jersey for the young rider classification, while a further 15 seconds in arrears, Kenny Elissonde took third place for Team Sky.

Just as he did in the 2016 edition of the race, Attaque Team Gusto's Ben Hill won a jersey, this time taking the polka dot jersey as winner of the mountains classification, while Jacob Kauffmann took the green jersey as winner of the sprints classification for the New South Wales Institute of Sport. The teams classification was won by Team Sky, having taken three of the five stage victories through Luke Rowe, Ian Stannard and Danny van Poppel.

== Teams ==
Fifteen teams were invited to take part in the race. These included two UCI WorldTeams, four UCI Professional Continental teams, seven UCI Continental teams and two national teams.

UCI WorldTeams

- Team Sky
- Orica–Scott

UCI Professional Continental teams

- Aqua Blue Sport
- Gazprom–RusVelo
- Roompot–Nederlandse Loterij
- UnitedHealthcare

UCI Continental teams

- 7 Eleven Roadbike Philippines
- Attaque Team Gusto
- Drapac–Pat's Veg
- IsoWhey Sports SwissWellness
- JLT–Condor
- New South Wales Institute of Sport
- St George Continental Cycling Team

National teams

- Australia
- New Zealand

== Route ==
The race route was released on 1 December 2016, with a route described by race director, and former three-time race winner, John Trevorrow as the "toughest course in recent history".

Stage schedule
Stage	Date	Route	Distance	Type	Winner
P	1 February	Melbourne	2.1 km (1 mi)	Individual time trial	Danny van Poppel (NED)
1	2 February	Wangaratta to Falls Creek	174.2 km (108 mi)	Hilly stage	Damien Howson (AUS)
2	3 February	Mount Beauty to Beechworth	165.5 km (103 mi)	Flat stage	Luke Rowe (GBR)
3	4 February	Benalla to Mitchelton Winery, Nagambie	167.7 km (104 mi)	Hilly stage	Travis McCabe (USA)
4	5 February	Kinglake to Kinglake	121 km (75 mi)	Hilly stage	Ian Stannard (GBR)

== Stages ==
=== Prologue ===
1 February 2017 — Melbourne, 2.1 km (1 mi), individual time trial (ITT)

Result of Prologue & General classification after Prologue
Rank	Rider	Team	Time
1	Danny van Poppel (NED)	Team Sky	2' 32"
2	Brenton Jones (AUS)	JLT–Condor	+ 1"
3	Alex Frame (NZL)	JLT–Condor	+ 1"
4	Michael Hepburn (AUS)	Orica–Scott	+ 2"
5	Leigh Howard (AUS)	Aqua Blue Sport	+ 3"
6	Anthony Giacoppo (AUS)	IsoWhey Sports SwissWellness	+ 3"
7	Jesse Kerrison (AUS)	IsoWhey Sports SwissWellness	+ 3"
8	Ian Bibby (GBR)	JLT–Condor	+ 4"
9	Travis McCabe (USA)	UnitedHealthcare	+ 4"
10	Cameron Bayly (AUS)	IsoWhey Sports SwissWellness	+ 4"

=== Stage 1 ===
2 February 2017 — Wangaratta to Falls Creek, 174.2 km (108 mi)

Result of Stage 1
Rank	Rider	Team	Time
1	Damien Howson (AUS)	Orica–Scott	4h 33' 54"
2	Jai Hindley (AUS)	Australia (national team)	+ 32"
3	Kenny Elissonde (FRA)	Team Sky	+ 47"
4	Michael Storer (AUS)	Australia (national team)	+ 1' 03"
5	Esteban Chaves (COL)	Orica–Scott	+ 1' 10"
6	Chris Froome (GBR)	Team Sky	+ 1' 11"
7	Nathan Earle (AUS)	Australia (national team)	+ 1' 11"
8	Lucas Hamilton (AUS)	Australia (national team)	+ 1' 11"
9	Cameron Meyer (AUS)	Australia (national team)	+ 1' 13"
10	Tim Roe (AUS)	IsoWhey Sports SwissWellness	+ 1' 15"

General classification after Stage 1
Rank	Rider	Team	Time
1	Damien Howson (AUS)	Orica–Scott	4h 36' 32"
2	Jai Hindley (AUS)	Australia (national team)	+ 38"
3	Kenny Elissonde (FRA)	Team Sky	+ 53"
4	Michael Storer (AUS)	Australia (national team)	+ 1' 10"
5	Chris Froome (GBR)	Team Sky	+ 1' 12"
6	Cameron Meyer (AUS)	Australia (national team)	+ 1' 13"
7	Lucas Hamilton (AUS)	Australia (national team)	+ 1' 13"
8	Nathan Earle (AUS)	Australia (national team)	+ 1' 15"
9	Esteban Chaves (COL)	Orica–Scott	+ 1' 15"
10	Tim Roe (AUS)	IsoWhey Sports SwissWellness	+ 1' 17"

=== Stage 2 ===
3 February 2017 — Mount Beauty to Beechworth, 165.5 km (103 mi)

Result of Stage 2
Rank	Rider	Team	Time
1	Luke Rowe (GBR)	Team Sky	4h 08' 23"
2	Conor Dunne (IRL)	Aqua Blue Sport	+ 33"
3	Tanner Putt (USA)	UnitedHealthcare	+ 56"
4	Robbie Hucker (AUS)	IsoWhey Sports SwissWellness	+ 57"
5	Steven Lampier (GBR)	JLT–Condor	+ 57"
6	Cameron Meyer (AUS)	Australia (national team)	+ 1' 12"
7	Martijn Tusveld (NED)	Roompot–Nederlandse Loterij	+ 1' 17"
8	Janier Acevedo (COL)	UnitedHealthcare	+ 1' 17"
9	Ian Bibby (GBR)	JLT–Condor	+ 1' 17"
10	Lucas Hamilton (AUS)	Australia (national team)	+ 1' 17"

General classification after Stage 2
Rank	Rider	Team	Time
1	Damien Howson (AUS)	Orica–Scott	8h 46' 12"
2	Jai Hindley (AUS)	Australia (national team)	+ 38"
3	Kenny Elissonde (FRA)	Team Sky	+ 53"
4	Cameron Meyer (AUS)	Australia (national team)	+ 1' 08"
5	Michael Storer (AUS)	Australia (national team)	+ 1' 10"
6	Chris Froome (GBR)	Team Sky	+ 1' 12"
7	Lucas Hamilton (AUS)	Australia (national team)	+ 1' 13"
8	Nathan Earle (AUS)	Australia (national team)	+ 1' 15"
9	Esteban Chaves (COL)	Orica–Scott	+ 1' 15"
10	Tim Roe (AUS)	IsoWhey Sports SwissWellness	+ 1' 17"

=== Stage 3 ===
4 February 2017 — Benalla to Mitchelton Winery, Nagambie, 167.7 km (104 mi)

Result of Stage 3
Rank	Rider	Team	Time
1	Travis McCabe (USA)	UnitedHealthcare	3h 46' 00"
2	Mitchell Docker (AUS)	Orica–Scott	+ 0"
3	Leigh Howard (AUS)	Aqua Blue Sport	+ 0"
4	Luke Rowe (GBR)	Team Sky	+ 0"
5	Alexey Tsatevich (RUS)	Gazprom–RusVelo	+ 0"
6	Ben Hill (AUS)	Attaque Team Gusto	+ 0"
7	Ivan Savitskiy (RUS)	Gazprom–RusVelo	+ 0"
8	Jesper Asselman (NED)	Roompot–Nederlandse Loterij	+ 0"
9	Jesse Kerrison (AUS)	IsoWhey Sports SwissWellness	+ 0"
10	Brad Evans (NZL)	Drapac–Pat's Veg	+ 0"

General classification after Stage 3
Rank	Rider	Team	Time
1	Damien Howson (AUS)	Orica–Scott	12h 32' 12"
2	Jai Hindley (AUS)	Australia (national team)	+ 38"
3	Kenny Elissonde (FRA)	Team Sky	+ 53"
4	Cameron Meyer (AUS)	Australia (national team)	+ 1' 08"
5	Michael Storer (AUS)	Australia (national team)	+ 1' 10"
6	Chris Froome (GBR)	Team Sky	+ 1' 12"
7	Lucas Hamilton (AUS)	Australia (national team)	+ 1' 13"
8	Nathan Earle (AUS)	Australia (national team)	+ 1' 15"
9	Esteban Chaves (COL)	Orica–Scott	+ 1' 15"
10	Tim Roe (AUS)	IsoWhey Sports SwissWellness	+ 1' 17"

=== Stage 4 ===
5 February 2017 — Kinglake to Kinglake, 121 km (75 mi)

Result of Stage 4
Rank	Rider	Team	Time
1	Ian Stannard (GBR)	Team Sky	2h 52' 44"
2	Aaron Gate (NZL)	Aqua Blue Sport	+ 0"
3	Taco van der Hoorn (NED)	Roompot–Nederlandse Loterij	+ 0"
4	Ben Hill (AUS)	Attaque Team Gusto	+ 0"
5	Robbie Hucker (AUS)	IsoWhey Sports SwissWellness	+ 0"
6	Alistair Slater (GBR)	JLT–Condor	+ 0"
7	Jason Christie (NZL)	New Zealand (national team)	+ 0"
8	Daniel Fitter (AUS)	New South Wales Institute of Sport	+ 0"
9	Cyrus Monk (AUS)	Drapac–Pat's Veg	+ 0"
10	Travis McCabe (USA)	UnitedHealthcare	+ 0"

Final general classification
Rank	Rider	Team	Time
1	Damien Howson (AUS)	Orica–Scott	15h 25' 13"
2	Jai Hindley (AUS)	Australia (national team)	+ 38"
3	Kenny Elissonde (FRA)	Team Sky	+ 53"
4	Cameron Meyer (AUS)	Australia (national team)	+ 1' 08"
5	Michael Storer (AUS)	Australia (national team)	+ 1' 10"
6	Chris Froome (GBR)	Team Sky	+ 1' 12"
7	Lucas Hamilton (AUS)	Australia (national team)	+ 1' 13"
8	Nathan Earle (AUS)	Australia (national team)	+ 1' 15"
9	Esteban Chaves (COL)	Orica–Scott	+ 1' 15"
10	Tim Roe (AUS)	IsoWhey Sports SwissWellness	+ 1' 17"

== Classification leadership table ==
Stage	Winner	General classification	Sprint classification	Mountains classification	Young rider classification	Most competitive rider	Team classification
P	Danny van Poppel	Danny van Poppel	not awarded	not awarded	Ayden Toovey	not awarded	JLT–Condor
1	Damien Howson	Damien Howson	Jacob Kauffmann	Damien Howson	Jai Hindley	Steven Lampier	Australia (national team)
2	Luke Rowe	Damien Howson	Jacob Kauffmann	Ben Hill	Jai Hindley	Luke Rowe	Team Sky
3	Travis McCabe	Damien Howson	Jacob Kauffmann	Ben Hill	Jai Hindley	Aaron Gate	Team Sky
4	Ian Stannard	Damien Howson	Jacob Kauffmann	Ben Hill	Jai Hindley	Cyrus Monk	Team Sky
Final		Damien Howson	Jacob Kauffmann	Ben Hill	Jai Hindley	no final award	Team Sky
