= 2016 UCI Oceania Tour =

Cycling competition

- Twelfth edition of the UCI Oceania Tour

Details
- Dates: 20 January 2016–5 March 2016
- Location: Oceania
- Races: 6

The 2016 UCI Oceania Tour was the twelfth season of the UCI Oceania Tour. The season began on 20 January 2016 with the New Zealand Cycle Classic and finished on 5 March 2016 with the Continental Championships.

The points leader, based on the cumulative results of previous races, wears the UCI Oceania Tour cycling jersey. Taylor Gunman from New Zealand is the defending 2015 UCI Oceania Tour champion.

Throughout the season, points are awarded to the top finishers of stages within stage races and the final general classification standings of each of the stages races and one-day events. The quality and complexity of a race also determines how many points are awarded to the top finishers, the higher the UCI rating of a race, the more points are awarded. The UCI ratings from highest to lowest are as follows:

- Multi-day events: 2.HC, 2.1 and 2.2
- One-day events: 1.HC, 1.1 and 1.2

== Events ==
Date	Race Name	Location	UCI Rating	Winner	Team
20–24 January	New Zealand Cycle Classic	New Zealand	2.2	Ben O'Connor (AUS)	Avanti IsoWhey Sports
31 January	2016 Cadel Evans Great Ocean Road Race	Australia	1.HC	Peter Kennaugh (GBR)	Team Sky
3–7 February	Herald Sun Tour	Australia	2.1	Chris Froome (GBR)	Team Sky
20 February	The REV Classic	New Zealand	1.2	Dion Smith (NZL)	New Zealand national team
3 March	Oceania Cycling Championships – Time Trial	Australia	CC	Sean Lake (AUS)	Australia national team
3 March	Oceania Cycling Championships – Time Trial U23	Australia	CC	Alexander Morgan (AUS)	Australia national team
5 March	Oceania Cycling Championships – Road Race	Australia	CC	Sean Lake (AUS)	Australia national team
5 March	Oceania Cycling Championships – Road Race U23	Australia	CC	Michael Storer (AUS)	Australia national team

== Final standings ==
=== Individual classification ===
Rank	Name	Points
1.	Sean Lake (AUS)	340
2.	Peter Kennaugh (GBR)	311
3.	Mark O'Brien (AUS)	213
4.	Brendan Canty (AUS)	200
5.	Dion Smith (NZL)	155
6.	Leigh Howard (AUS)	150
7.	Michael Storer (AUS)	148
8.	Christopher Froome (GBR)	144
9.	Jack Bobridge (AUS)	131
10.	Niccolo Bonifazio (ITA)	130

=== Team classification ===
Rank	Team	Points
1.	(Australia) Avanti IsoWhey Sports	895
2.	(United Kingdom) Team Sky	531
3.	(Australia) Drapac Professional Cycling	378
4.	(United Kingdom) ONE Pro Cycling	278
5.	(Australia) Orica–GreenEDGE	277
6.	(United States) Trek–Segafredo	267
7.	(South Africa) Team Dimension Data	185
8.	(Switzerland) IAM Cycling	160
9.	(Kenya) Kenyan Riders Downunder	149
10.	(Belgium) Lotto–Soudal	115

=== Nation classification ===
Rank	Nation	Points
1.	Australia	1707
2.	New Zealand	616
