= NSW Institute of Sport (cycling team) =

Team information
- UCI code: NIS
- Registered: Australia
- Founded: 2017
- Disbanded: 2017
- Discipline: Road
- Status: UCI Continental

Team name history
- 2017: NSW Institute of Sport

NSW Institute of Sport was an Australian UCI Continental cycling team founded in 2017 and disbanded at the end of the same year.

== Team roster ==
| Rider | Date of birth |
|---|---|
| Ryan Cavanagh (AUS) | 22 November 1995 (age 30) |
| Daniel Fitter (AUS) | 19 June 1996 (age 30) |
| Jacob Kauffmann (AUS) | 24 March 1987 (age 39) |
| Liam Magennis (AUS) | 14 March 1997 (age 29) |
| Thomas Robinson (AUS) | 30 November 1989 (age 36) |
| Stuart Shaw (AUS) | 19 November 1977 (age 48) |

| Rider | Date of birth |
|---|---|
| Alexander Smyth (MLT) | 10 December 1988 (age 37) |
| Dylan Sunderland (AUS) | 26 February 1996 (age 30) |
| Joshua Taylor (AUS) | 21 July 1991 (age 35) |
| Ayden Toovey (AUS) | 8 November 1995 (age 30) |
| Alex Wohler (AUS) | 11 July 1992 (age 34) |
