= Lucas Hamilton =

Australian cyclist (born 1996)

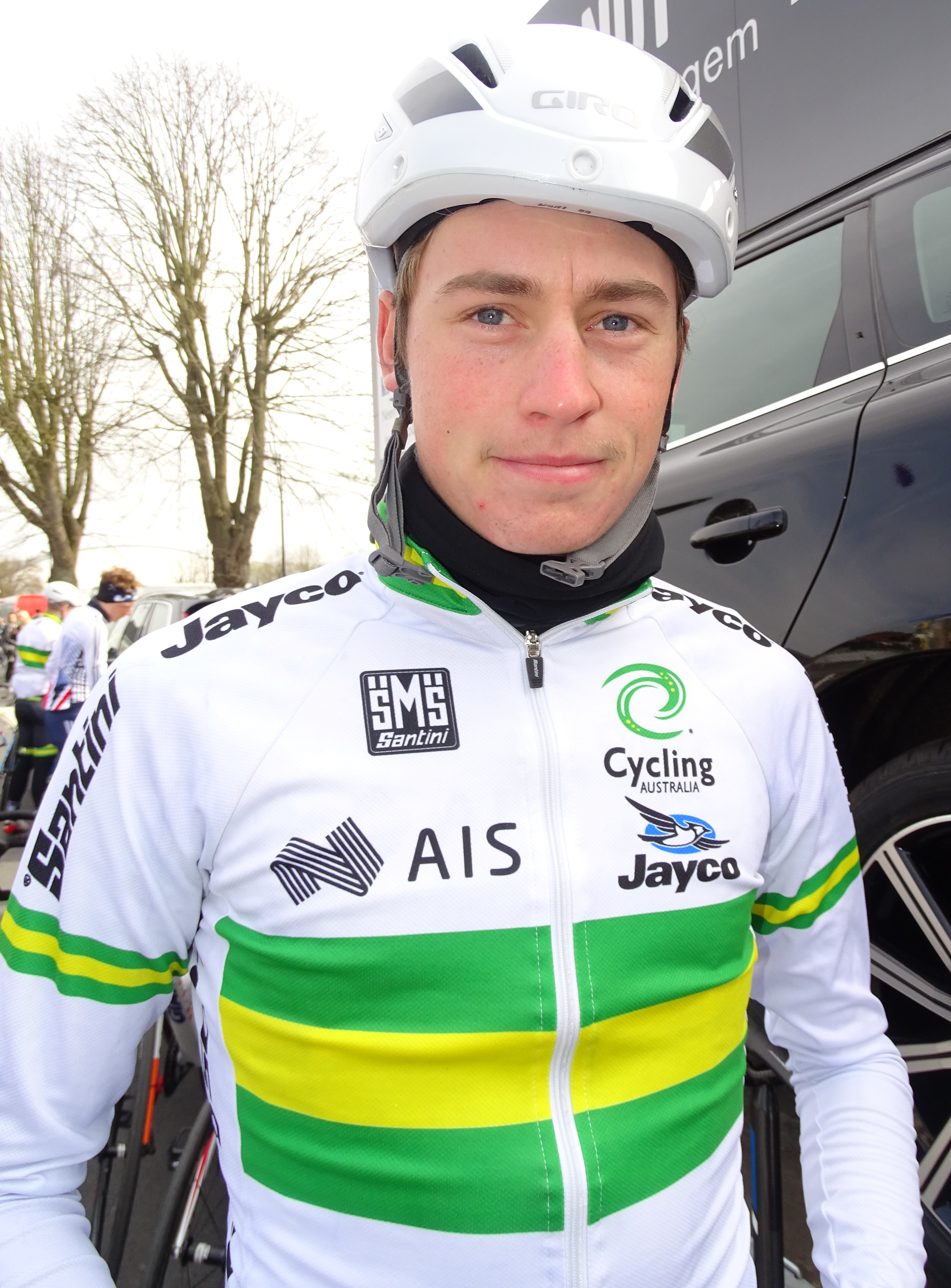
- Hamilton in 2016

Personal information
- Born: 12 February 1996 (age 30) Ararat, Victoria, Australia
- Height: 1.84 m (6 ft 0 in)
- Weight: 71 kg (157 lb)

Cycling career
- Sport: Cycling
- Current team: Netcompany–Ineos
- Discipline: Road
- Role: Rider
- Rider type: Climber

Amateur team
- 2016: Jayco–AIS World Tour Academy

Professional teams
- 2017: Mitchelton Scott
- 2018–2024: Mitchelton–Scott
- 2025–: INEOS Grenadiers

Lucas Hamilton (born 12 February 1996) is an Australian cyclist, who currently rides for UCI WorldTeam Netcompany–Ineos.

Hamilton qualified for the Tokyo 2020 Olympics and rode in the Men's Road Race. The men's road racers had a tough time in the conditions and he finished 71st.

He is not related to Australian cyclist Chris Hamilton.

== Early years ==
Hamilton began cycling as a 12-years-old with the Ararat and Districts Cycling Club in Victoria. He performed so well that he was given a Victorian Institute of Sport scholarship in 2014.

Hamilton gained his first national team selection at the age of 20, in 2016. He raced in the U19 World Road Race Championship and then went onto win the Mountains Classification at the 2016 Tour de l'Avenir. This event is widely regarded as the U23 Tour de France Overall he managed to finish the event as runner-up.

== Career ==
Hamilton signed a three-year deal with Mitchelton–Scott in 2017. In the same year he won the U23 Oceania Road Race Championships and finished an impressive second overall at the 2017 Giro Ciclistico d'Italia, GP Palio del Recioto and GP Marmo.

Hamilton was named Best Young Rider for Australia's World Tour one-day classic and the Cadel Evans Great Ocean Road Race. He joined the World Tour with Mitchelton–Scott in 2018, and has since continued to rise in the world standings. He won Stage 1 and Stage 2 at the 2018 Hammer Stavange, and in 2019 won Stage 1 and Stage 4 at the Czech Cycling Tour.

Returning to Australia for the 2020 Tour Down Under, Hamilton came ninth place. He went on to be placed second at the 2020 National Road Race Championships. That same year, Lucas won his maiden World Tour win on stage four of Tirreno Adriatico.

Hamilton began his fourth professional year signing with Team BikeExchange. He led the team at the 2021 Tour de France in their general classification campaign.

== Major results ==
2014
1st Road race, Oceania Junior Road Championships
1st Road race, National Junior Road Championships
2016
2nd Overall An Post Rás
2017
1st Road race, Oceania Road Championships
1st Overall Tour Alsace

1st Young rider classification
1st Mountains classification

2nd Overall Giro Ciclistico d'Italia

1st Stage 5b (ITT)

2nd Trofeo Edil C
2nd Giro del Belvedere
2nd GP Palio del Recioto
3rd Overall Toscana-Terra di Ciclismo
3rd Liège–Bastogne–Liège Espoirs
4th Overall Tour de l'Avenir
7th Overall Herald Sun Tour
2018
7th Overall Settimana Internazionale di Coppi e Bartali
2019
1st Overall Settimana Internazionale di Coppi e Bartali

1st Young rider classification
1st Stage 1b (TTT)

2nd Overall Czech Cycling Tour

1st Stages 1 (TTT) & 4

6th Overall Herald Sun Tour
2020
1st Stage 4 Tirreno–Adriatico
1st Stage 1 (TTT) Czech Cycling Tour
2nd Road race, National Road Championships
9th Overall Tour Down Under
2021
4th Overall Paris–Nice
5th Time trial, National Road Championships
8th Overall Tour de Romandie
10th Overall Volta a Catalunya
2023
4th Maryland Cycling Classic

=== General classification results timeline ===
Grand Tour general classification results
Grand Tour	2018	2019	2020	2021	2022	2023	2024
Giro d'Italia	—	25	DNF	—	13	—	—
Tour de France	—	—	—	DNF	—	—	—
Vuelta a España	—	—	—	54	78	—	—
Major stage race general classification results
Race	2018	2019	2020	2021	2022	2023	2024
Paris–Nice	—	—	—	4	DNF	22	—
Tirreno–Adriatico	—	—	32	—	—	—	—
Volta a Catalunya	—	—	NH	10	—	—	—
Tour of the Basque Country	61	15	NH	—	DNF	—	33
Tour de Romandie	28	—	NH	8	—	—	—
Critérium du Dauphiné	47	—	—	—	—	—	—
Tour de Suisse	—	—	NH	DNF	—	—	—
