= 2017 Presidential Tour of Turkey =

2017 UCI World Tour

Race details
- Dates: 10–15 October
- Stages: 6
- Distance: 1,026.3 km (637.7 mi)

Results
Jersey awarded to the overall winner	Winner	Diego Ulissi (ITA)	(UAE Team Emirates)
	Second	Jesper Hansen (DEN)	(Astana)
	Third	Fausto Masnada (ITA)	(Androni–Sidermec–Bottecchia)
Jersey awarded to the points classification winner	Points	Edward Theuns (BEL)	(Trek–Segafredo)
Jersey awarded to the mountains classification winner	Mountains	Mirco Maestri (ITA)	(Bardiani–CSF)
Jersey awarded to the young rider classification winner	Young rider	Daniel Martínez (COL)	(Wilier Triestina–Selle Italia)
	Team	Wilier Triestina–Selle Italia	

The 2017 Presidential Tour of Turkey was a road cycling stage race that took place in Turkey between 10 and 15 October 2017. It was the 53rd edition of the Presidential Tour of Turkey and was part of the 2017 UCI World Tour. It was the first time that the race was included in the UCI World Tour calendar. Originally, the race was scheduled to take place between 18–23 April, but was postponed in February. At the end of March, the race was confirmed to be held over 10–15 October.

The race was won by Diego Ulissi of Italy.

== Final standings ==
Legend
General classification	Denotes the leader of the General classification	Mountains classification	Denotes the leader of the Mountains classification
Youth classification	Denotes the leader of the Youth classification	Sprints classification	Denotes the leader of the Best Sprinter classification

=== General classification ===
	Rider	Team	Time
1	Diego Ulissi (ITA)	UAE Team Emirates	26h 32' 13"
2	Jesper Hansen (DEN)	Astana	+ 12"
3	Fausto Masnada (ITA)	Androni–Sidermec–Bottecchia	+ 24"
4	Daniel Martínez (COL)	Wilier Triestina–Selle Italia	+ 29"
5	Ildar Arslanov (RUS)	Gazprom–RusVelo	+ 30"
6	Yonder Godoy (VEN)	Wilier Triestina–Selle Italia	+ 30"
7	Francesco Gavazzi (ITA)	Androni–Sidermec–Bottecchia	+ 38"
8	Przemysław Niemiec (POL)	UAE Team Emirates	+ 47"
9	Andrey Zeits (KAZ)	Astana	+ 50"
10	Jarlinson Pantano (COL)	Trek–Segafredo	+ 1' 03"
