= Sean Lake =

Australian cyclist

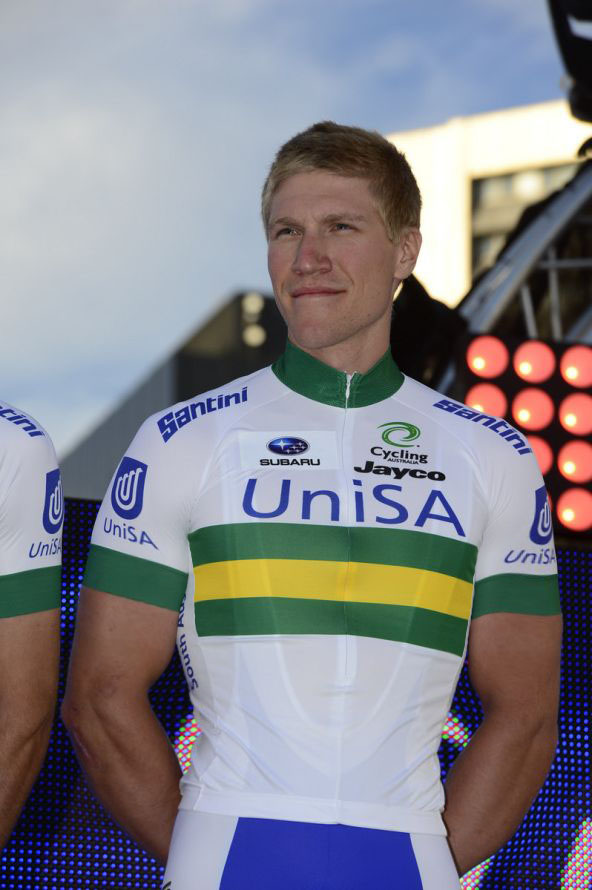

Personal information
- Born: 6 December 1991 (age 34) Whyalla, Australia

Cycling career
- Sport: Cycling
- Discipline: Road
- Role: Rider
- Rider type: ITT

Professional teams
- 2015: African Wildlife Safaris Cycling Team
- 2016—2018: Avanti IsoWhey Sports

Sean Lake (born 6 December 1991) is an Australian professional racing cyclist. He won the King of the Mountains jersey on the first stage of the 2016 Tour Down Under. Lake is a two-time Oceania Time trial champion.

== Major results ==
2015
1st Stage 1 Tour of Tasmania
1st Stage 1 Tour of Bright
2016
1st UCI Oceania Tour
Oceania Road Championships

1st Time trial
1st Road race

3rd Time trial, National Road Championships
2017
Oceania Road Championships

1st Time trial
4th Road race

2018
2nd Time trial Oceania Road Championships

== Personal life ==
Lake currently teaches Biology and Junior Science at Xavier College in Melbourne.
