= 2019 Women's Tour Down Under =

Race details
- Dates: 10–13 January 2019
- Stages: 4
- Distance: 376.6 km (234.0 mi)
- Winning time: 10h 27' 26"

Results
Jersey awarded to the overall winner	Winner	Amanda Spratt (AUS)	(Mitchelton–Scott)
	Second	Lucy Kennedy (AUS)	(Mitchelton–Scott)
	Third	Rachel Neylan (AUS)	(UniSA–Australia)
Jersey awarded to the mountains classification winner	Mountains	Nadia Quagliotto (ITA)	(Alé–Cipollini)
Jersey awarded to the young rider classification winner	Young rider	Jaime Gunning (AUS)	(Specialized Women's Racing)
Jersey awarded to the sprints classification winner	Sprints	Sarah Roy (AUS)	(Mitchelton–Scott)
	Team	(Australia) Mitchelton–Scott	

The 2019 Women's Tour Down Under (officially the 2019 Santos Women's Tour Down Under for sponsorship reasons) was the 4th edition of the Women's Tour Down Under. It began on 10 January in Hahndorf and concluded on 13 January in Adelaide.

The race was won by Australian rider Amanda Spratt of Mitchelton–Scott, who claimed victory for a third year in a row. Spratt won the race 49 seconds ahead of fellow Mitchelton–Scott rider Lucy Kennedy, who was followed by third place finisher Rachel Neylan of UniSA–Australia. Meanwhile, Sarah Roy of Mitchelton–Scott won the sprints classification, Jaime Gunning of Specialized Women's Racing won the youth classification, and Italian rider Nadia Quagliotto of Alé–Cipollini secured the mountain classification.

== Teams ==
15 teams participated in the 2019 Women's Tour Down Under.

UCI Women's Teams

- Alé–Cipollini
- Astana
- Bepink
- CCC - Liv
- Doltcini–Van Eyck Sport
- Mitchelton–Scott
- Rally UHC Cycling
- Swapit–Agolíco
- Tibco–Silicon Valley Bank
- Trek–Segafredo

Other teams

- UniSA–Australia
- Gusto StepFWD KOM
- New Zealand (national team)
- Specialized Women's Racing
- Sydney University

== Route ==
The race route was announced on 8 September 2018.

Stage characteristics and winners
Stage	Date	Course	Distance	Type	Stage winner
1	10 January	Hahndorf to Birdwood	112.9 km (70.2 mi)	Hilly stage	Letizia Paternoster (ITA)
2	11 January	Nuriootpa to Mengler Hill	116.7 km (72.5 mi)	Hilly stage	Amanda Spratt (AUS)
3	12 January	Nairne to Stirling	104.5 km (64.9 mi)	Hilly stage	Grace Brown (AUS)
4	13 January	Adelaide	42.5 km (26.4 mi)	Flat stage	Chloe Hosking (AUS)
Total			376.6 km (234.0 mi)		

== Stages ==
=== Stage 1 ===
10 January — Hahndorf to Birdwood, 112.9 km (70.2 mi)

Stage 1 Result
Rank	Rider	Team	Time
1	Letizia Paternoster (ITA)	Trek–Segafredo	3h 10' 28"
2	Sarah Roy (AUS)	Mitchelton–Scott	+ 0"
3	Arlenis Sierra (CUB)	Astana	+ 0"
4	Alison Jackson (CAN)	Tibco–Silicon Valley Bank	+ 0"
5	Rachele Barbieri (ITA)	Bepink	+ 0"
6	Ashleigh Moolman Pasio (RSA)	CCC - Liv	+ 0"
7	Matilda Raynolds (AUS)	Specialized Women's Racing	+ 0"
8	Rebecca Wiasak (AUS)	UniSA–Australia	+ 0"
9	Niamh Fisher-Black (NZL)	New Zealand (national team)	+ 0"
10	Chloe Hosking (AUS)	Alé–Cipollini	+ 0"

General classification after Stage 1
Rank	Rider	Team	Time
1	Letizia Paternoster (ITA)	Trek–Segafredo	3h 10' 18"
2	Sarah Roy (AUS)	Mitchelton–Scott	+ 2"
3	Chloe Hosking (AUS)	Alé–Cipollini	+ 5"
4	Gracie Elvin (AUS)	Mitchelton–Scott	+ 5"
5	Arlenis Sierra (CUB)	Astana	+ 6"
6	Alison Jackson (CAN)	Tibco–Silicon Valley Bank	+ 10"
7	Rachele Barbieri (ITA)	Bepink	+ 10"
8	Ashleigh Moolman Pasio (RSA)	CCC - Liv	+ 10"
9	Matilda Raynolds (AUS)	Specialized Women's Racing	+ 10"
10	Rebecca Wiasak (AUS)	UniSA–Australia	+ 10"

=== Stage 2 ===
11 January — Nuriootpa to Mengler Hill, 116.7 km (72.5 mi)

Stage 2 Result
Rank	Rider	Team	Time
1	Amanda Spratt (AUS)	Mitchelton–Scott	3h 13' 20"
2	Lucy Kennedy (AUS)	Mitchelton–Scott	+ 39"
3	Kristabel Doebel-Hickok (USA)	Rally UHC Cycling	+ 45"
4	Rachel Neylan (AUS)	UniSA–Australia	+ 50"
5	Jaime Gunning (AUS)	Specialized Women's Racing	+ 53"
6	Alison Jackson (CAN)	Tibco–Silicon Valley Bank	+ 1' 01"
7	Ashleigh Moolman Pasio (RSA)	CCC - Liv	+ 1' 10"
8	Lauren Stephens (USA)	Tibco–Silicon Valley Bank	+ 1' 10"
9	Taryn Heather (AUS)	Specialized Women's Racing	+ 1' 13"
10	Emily Roper (AUS)	UniSA–Australia	+ 1' 16"

General classification after Stage 2
Rank	Rider	Team	Time
1	Amanda Spratt (AUS)	Mitchelton–Scott	6h 23' 38"
2	Lucy Kennedy (AUS)	Mitchelton–Scott	+ 43"
3	Kristabel Doebel-Hickok (USA)	Rally UHC Cycling	+ 51"
4	Rachel Neylan (AUS)	UniSA–Australia	+ 1' 00"
5	Jaime Gunning (AUS)	Specialized Women's Racing	+ 1' 03"
6	Alison Jackson (CAN)	Tibco–Silicon Valley Bank	+ 1' 11"
7	Ashleigh Moolman Pasio (RSA)	CCC - Liv	+ 1' 20"
8	Lauren Stephens (USA)	Tibco–Silicon Valley Bank	+ 1' 20"
9	Taryn Heather (AUS)	Specialized Women's Racing	+ 1' 23"
10	Emily Roper (AUS)	UniSA–Australia	+ 1' 46"

=== Stage 3 ===
12 January — Nairne to Stirling, 104.5 km (64.9 mi)

Stage 3 Result
Rank	Rider	Team	Time
1	Grace Brown (AUS)	Mitchelton–Scott	3h 01' 07"
2	Ruth Winder (USA)	Trek–Segafredo	+ 2"
3	Rachel Neylan (AUS)	UniSA–Australia	+ 2"
4	Gracie Elvin (AUS)	Mitchelton–Scott	+ 4"
5	Amanda Spratt (AUS)	Mitchelton–Scott	+ 4"
6	Letizia Paternoster (ITA)	Trek–Segafredo	+ 4"
7	Kristabel Doebel-Hickok (USA)	Rally UHC Cycling	+ 7"
8	Lucy Kennedy (AUS)	Mitchelton–Scott	+ 9"
9	Emily Roper (AUS)	UniSA–Australia	+ 9"
10	Alison Jackson (CAN)	Tibco–Silicon Valley Bank	+ 9"

General classification after Stage 3
Rank	Rider	Team	Time
1	Amanda Spratt (AUS)	Mitchelton–Scott	9h 24' 48"
2	Lucy Kennedy (AUS)	Mitchelton–Scott	+ 49"
3	Kristabel Doebel-Hickok (USA)	Rally UHC Cycling	+ 55"
4	Rachel Neylan (AUS)	UniSA–Australia	+ 55"
5	Jaime Gunning (AUS)	Specialized Women's Racing	+ 1' 09"
6	Alison Jackson (CAN)	Tibco–Silicon Valley Bank	+ 1' 12"
7	Lauren Stephens (USA)	Tibco–Silicon Valley Bank	+ 1' 34"
8	Taryn Heather (AUS)	Specialized Women's Racing	+ 1' 37"
9	Emily Roper (AUS)	UniSA–Australia	+ 1' 52"
10	Ruth Winder (USA)	Trek–Segafredo	+ 1' 54"

=== Stage 4 ===
13 January — Adelaide, 42.5 km (26.4 mi)

Stage 4 Result
Rank	Rider	Team	Time
1	Chloe Hosking (AUS)	Alé–Cipollini	1h 02' 38"
2	Letizia Paternoster (ITA)	Trek–Segafredo	+ 0"
3	Rachele Barbieri (ITA)	Bepink	+ 0"
4	Sarah Roy (AUS)	Mitchelton–Scott	+ 0"
5	Alison Jackson (CAN)	Tibco–Silicon Valley Bank	+ 0"
6	Arlenis Sierra (CUB)	Astana	+ 0"
7	Paola Muñoz (CHL)	Swapit–Agolíco	+ 0"
8	Lauretta Hanson (AUS)	Trek–Segafredo	+ 0"
9	Amy Cure (AUS)	Specialized Women's Racing	+ 0"
10	Gracie Elvin (AUS)	Mitchelton–Scott	+ 0"

General classification after Stage 4
Rank	Rider	Team	Time
1	Amanda Spratt (AUS)	Mitchelton–Scott	10h 27' 26"
2	Lucy Kennedy (AUS)	Mitchelton–Scott	+ 49"
3	Rachel Neylan (AUS)	UniSA–Australia	+ 53"
4	Kristabel Doebel-Hickok (USA)	Rally UHC Cycling	+ 55"
5	Alison Jackson (CAN)	Tibco–Silicon Valley Bank	+ 1' 08"
6	Jaime Gunning (AUS)	Specialized Women's Racing	+ 1' 09"
7	Lauren Stephens (USA)	Tibco–Silicon Valley Bank	+ 1' 34"
8	Taryn Heather (AUS)	Specialized Women's Racing	+ 1' 37"
9	Emily Roper (AUS)	UniSA–Australia	+ 1' 52"
10	Ruth Winder (USA)	Trek–Segafredo	+ 1' 54"

== Classification leadership table ==
Classification leadership by stage
Stage	Winner	General classification	Sprints classification	Mountains classification	Young rider classification	Team classification
1	Letizia Paternoster	Letizia Paternoster	Sarah Roy	Nadia Quagliotto	Letizia Paternoster	New Zealand (national team)
2	Amanda Spratt	Amanda Spratt	Sarah Roy	Nadia Quagliotto	Jaime Gunning	Mitchelton–Scott
3	Grace Brown	Amanda Spratt	Sarah Roy	Nadia Quagliotto	Jaime Gunning	Mitchelton–Scott
4	Chloe Hosking	Amanda Spratt	Sarah Roy	Nadia Quagliotto	Jaime Gunning	Mitchelton–Scott
Final		Amanda Spratt	Sarah Roy	Nadia Quagliotto	Jaime Gunning	Mitchelton–Scott

== Classification standings ==
Legend
Denotes the leader of the general classification	Denotes the leader of the sprints classification
Denotes the leader of the mountains classification	Denotes the leader of the young rider classification

=== General classification ===
Final general classification (1–10)
Rank	Rider	Team	Time
1	Amanda Spratt (AUS)	Mitchelton–Scott	10h 27' 26"
2	Lucy Kennedy (AUS)	Mitchelton–Scott	+ 49"
3	Rachel Neylan (AUS)	UniSA–Australia	+ 53"
4	Kristabel Doebel-Hickok (USA)	Rally UHC Cycling	+ 55"
5	Alison Jackson (CAN)	Tibco–Silicon Valley Bank	+ 1' 08"
6	Jaime Gunning (AUS)	Specialized Women's Racing	+ 1' 09"
7	Lauren Stephens (USA)	Tibco–Silicon Valley Bank	+ 1' 34"
8	Taryn Heather (AUS)	Specialized Women's Racing	+ 1' 37"
9	Emily Roper (AUS)	UniSA–Australia	+ 1' 52"
10	Ruth Winder (USA)	Trek–Segafredo	+ 1' 54"

=== Sprints classification ===
Final sprints classification (1–10)
Rank	Rider	Team	Points
1	Sarah Roy (AUS)	Mitchelton–Scott	188
2	Chloe Hosking (AUS)	Alé–Cipollini	181
3	Alison Jackson (CAN)	Tibco–Silicon Valley Bank	175
4	Letizia Paternoster (ITA)	Trek–Segafredo	104
5	Rachele Barbieri (ITA)	Bepink	103
6	Gracie Elvin (AUS)	Mitchelton–Scott	88
7	Rebecca Wiasak (AUS)	UniSA–Australia	72
8	Rachel Neylan (AUS)	UniSA–Australia	69
9	Grace Brown (AUS)	Mitchelton–Scott	65
10	Kristabel Doebel-Hickok (USA)	Rally UHC Cycling	65

=== Mountains classification ===
Final mountains classification (1–10)
Rank	Rider	Team	Points
1	Nadia Quagliotto (ITA)	Alé–Cipollini	26
2	Amanda Spratt (AUS)	Mitchelton–Scott	18
3	Lucy Kennedy (AUS)	Mitchelton–Scott	12
4	Alice Cobb (GBR)	Tibco–Silicon Valley Bank	11
5	Kristabel Doebel-Hickok (USA)	Rally UHC Cycling	11
6	Tetyana Ryabchenko (UKR)	Doltcini–Van Eyck Sport	8
7	Deborah Paine (NZL)	New Zealand (national team)	7
8	Georgia Williams (NZL)	Mitchelton–Scott	7
9	Rachel Neylan (AUS)	UniSA–Australia	6
10	Elena Pirrone (ITA)	Astana	6

=== Young rider classification ===
Final young rider classification (1–10)
Rank	Rider	Team	Time
1	Jaime Gunning (AUS)	Specialized Women's Racing	10h 28' 35"
2	Niamh Fisher-Black (NZL)	New Zealand (national team)	+ 1' 51"
3	Katia Ragusa (ITA)	Bepink	+ 1' 58"
4	Elizabeth Stannard (AUS)	Gusto StepFWD KOM	+ 2' 15"
5	Grace Anderson (NZL)	New Zealand (national team)	+ 2' 18"
6	Jess Pratt (AUS)	Sydney University	+ 2' 22"
7	Letizia Paternoster (ITA)	Trek–Segafredo	+ 2' 50"
8	Elena Pirrone (ITA)	Astana	+ 4' 14"
9	Amanda Jamieson (NZL)	New Zealand (national team)	+ 4' 43"
10	Nadia Quagliotto (ITA)	Alé–Cipollini	+ 5' 25"

=== Team classification ===
Final team classification (1–10)
Rank	Team	Time
1	(Australia) Mitchelton–Scott	31h 25' 50"
2	UniSA–Australia	+ 1' 18"
3	(United States) Tibco–Silicon Valley Bank	+ 2' 34"
4	(Australia) Specialized Women's Racing	+ 2' 35"
5	(United States) Trek–Segafredo	+ 6' 10"
6	New Zealand (national team)	+ 6' 20"
7	(Australia) Sydney University	+ 8' 24"
8	(Italy) Astana	+ 8' 32"
9	(United States) Rally UHC Cycling	+ 11' 03"
10	(Italy) Alé–Cipollini	+ 12' 19"
