= 2011 Tour Down Under =

13th edition of the Tour Down Under stage race

2011 UCI World Tour, race 1 of 27

Race details
- Dates: 18–23 January 2011
- Stages: 6
- Distance: 758 km (471 mi)
- Winning time: 17h 54' 27"

Results
Jersey awarded to the overall winner	Winner	Cameron Meyer (Australia)	(Garmin–Cervélo)
	Second	Matthew Goss (Australia)	(HTC–Highroad)
	Third	Ben Swift (Great Britain)	(Team Sky)
Jersey awarded to the mountains classification winner	Mountains	Luke Roberts (Australia)	(UniSA-Australia)
Jersey awarded to the young rider classification winner	Young rider	Cameron Meyer (Australia)	(Garmin–Cervélo)
Jersey awarded to the sprints classification winner	Sprints	Matthew Goss (Australia)	(HTC–Highroad)
	Team	Movistar Team	

The 2011 Santos Tour Down Under was the 13th edition of the Tour Down Under stage race. It took place from 18 to 23 January in and around Adelaide, South Australia, and was the first race of the 2011 UCI World Tour. The Tour was preceded by the Cancer Council Classic race, on Sunday, 16 January, that consisted in a circuit of 30 laps around the Rymill Park in Adelaide's East End, totaling 51 kilometres (32 mi).

The race was won by Garmin–Cervélo rider Cameron Meyer, after holding onto the leader's ochre jersey which came from a breakaway stage win on stage four. Meyer's winning margin over runner-up and fellow Australian Matthew Goss (HTC–Highroad) – winner of the first stage of the race – was just two seconds, the equal second smallest margin in the race's history. Team Sky's Ben Swift – a stage winner on the second and final stages – completed the podium, eight seconds down on Meyer.

In the race's other classifications, overall winner Meyer also guaranteed himself the black jersey for the highest placed rider under the age of 26, and Goss took home the blue jersey for amassing the highest number of points during stages at intermediate sprints and stage finishes. UniSA-Australia rider Luke Roberts won the King of the Mountains classification, with Movistar Team finishing at the head of the teams classification.

== Overall favourites ==
The 2011 Tour Down Under marked Mark Cavendish of HTC–Highroad's first appearance. André Greipel left Mark Cavendish's team of Team HTC–Columbia in 2010 and joined Omega Pharma–Lotto, creating a rivalry between the two top sprinters. Greipel became the leader of Omega Pharma–Lotto, and tried to take full advantage of his captaincy to win his third Tour Down Under.

Although he was not expected to be an overall contender, the 2011 Tour marks Lance Armstrong's last race outside the U.S. as a professional cyclist.

== Participating teams ==
As the Tour Down Under was a UCI World Tour event, all UCI ProTeams were invited automatically and obligated to send a squad.

UCI ProTeams:

- Ag2r–La Mondiale
- Astana
- BMC Racing Team
- Euskaltel–Euskadi
- Garmin–Cervélo
- Lampre–ISD
- Liquigas–Cannondale
- Quick-Step
- Omega Pharma–Lotto
- Rabobank
- HTC–Highroad
- Team Katusha
- Leopard Trek
- Movistar Team
- Team RadioShack
- Saxo Bank–SunGard
- Team Sky
- Vacansoleil–DCM

Teams awarded a wildcard invitation:

- Uni SA-Australia

== Schedule ==
Stage	Route	Distance	Date	Winner
1	Mawson Lakes > Angaston	138 km (86 mi)	Tuesday, 18 January	Matthew Goss (AUS)
2	Tailem Bend > Mannum	146 km (91 mi)	Wednesday, 19 January	Ben Swift (GBR)
3	Unley > Stirling	129 km (80 mi)	Thursday, 20 January	Michael Matthews (AUS)
4	Norwood > Strathalbyn	124 km (77 mi)	Friday, 21 January	Cameron Meyer (AUS)
5	McLaren Vale > Willunga	131 km (81 mi)	Saturday, 22 January	Francisco Ventoso (ESP)
6	Adelaide > Adelaide	90 km (56 mi)	Sunday, 23 January	Ben Swift (GBR)

== Stages ==
=== Stage 1, Mawson Lakes to Angaston ===
Stage 1 Result

	Rider	Team	Time
1	Matthew Goss (AUS)	HTC–Highroad	3h 17' 08"
2	André Greipel (GER)	Omega Pharma–Lotto	s.t.
3	Robbie McEwen (AUS)	Team RadioShack	s.t.
4	Christopher Sutton (AUS)	Team Sky	s.t.
5	Elia Viviani (ITA)	Liquigas–Cannondale	s.t.
6	Romain Feillu (FRA)	Vacansoleil–DCM	s.t.
7	Alessandro Ballan (ITA)	BMC Racing Team	s.t.
8	Iñaki Isasi (ESP)	Euskaltel–Euskadi	s.t.
9	José Joaquín Rojas (ESP)	Movistar Team	s.t.
10	Greg Henderson (NZL)	Team Sky	s.t.

General Classification after Stage 1

	Rider	Team	Time
1	Matthew Goss (AUS)	HTC–Highroad	3h 16' 58"
2	André Greipel (GER)	Omega Pharma–Lotto	+ 4"
3	Robbie McEwen (AUS)	Team RadioShack	+ 6"
4	Mitchell Docker (AUS)	UniSA-Australia	+ 7"
5	Mathieu Perget (FRA)	Ag2r–La Mondiale	+ 7"
6	Simon Clarke (AUS)	Astana	+ 7"
7	Miguel Minguez (ESP)	Euskaltel–Euskadi	+ 7"
8	Christopher Sutton (AUS)	Team Sky	+ 10"
9	Elia Viviani (ITA)	Liquigas–Cannondale	+ 10"
10	Romain Feillu (FRA)	Vacansoleil–DCM	+ 10"

=== Stage 2, Tailem Bend to Mannum ===
Stage 2 Result

	Rider	Team	Time
1	Ben Swift (GBR)	Team Sky	3h 27' 44"
2	Robbie McEwen (AUS)	Team RadioShack	s.t.
3	Graeme Brown (AUS)	Rabobank	s.t.
4	Romain Feillu (FRA)	Vacansoleil–DCM	s.t.
5	Jürgen Roelandts (BEL)	Omega Pharma–Lotto	s.t.
6	Francesco Chicchi (ITA)	Quick-Step	s.t.
7	Michael Matthews (AUS)	Rabobank	s.t.
8	Denis Galimzyanov (RUS)	Team Katusha	s.t.
9	Francisco Ventoso (ESP)	Movistar Team	s.t.
10	Allan Davis (AUS)	Astana	s.t.

General Classification after Stage 2

	Rider	Team	Time
1	Robbie McEwen (AUS)	Team RadioShack	6h 44' 42"
2	Matthew Goss (AUS)	HTC–Highroad	+ 0"
3	Ben Swift (GBR)	Team Sky	+ 0"
4	André Greipel (GER)	Omega Pharma–Lotto	+ 4"
5	Mitchell Docker (AUS)	UniSA-Australia	+ 4"
6	Graeme Brown (AUS)	Rabobank	+ 6"
7	David Tanner (AUS)	Saxo Bank–SunGard	+ 6"
8	Mathieu Perget (FRA)	Ag2r–La Mondiale	+ 7"
9	Miguel Minguez (ESP)	Euskaltel–Euskadi	+ 7"
10	Simon Zahner (SWI)	BMC Racing Team	+ 7"

=== Stage 3, Unley to Stirling ===
Stage 3 Result

	Rider	Team	Time
1	Michael Matthews (AUS)	Rabobank	3h 11' 47"
2	André Greipel (GER)	Omega Pharma–Lotto	s.t.
3	Matthew Goss (AUS)	HTC–Highroad	s.t.
4	Simon Gerrans (AUS)	Team Sky	s.t.
5	Luke Roberts (AUS)	UniSA-Australia	s.t.
6	Francisco Ventoso (ESP)	Movistar Team	s.t.
7	Gorka Izagirre (ESP)	Euskaltel–Euskadi	s.t.
8	Allan Davis (AUS)	Astana	s.t.
9	Blel Kadri (FRA)	Ag2r–La Mondiale	s.t.
10	Simone Ponzi (ITA)	Liquigas–Cannondale	s.t.

General Classification after Stage 3

	Rider	Team	Time
1	Matthew Goss (AUS)	HTC–Highroad	9h 56' 25"
2	André Greipel (GER)	Omega Pharma–Lotto	+ 2"
3	Robbie McEwen (AUS)	Team RadioShack	+ 4"
4	Michael Matthews (AUS)	Rabobank	+ 4"
5	Ben Swift (GBR)	Team Sky	+ 4"
6	Allan Davis (AUS)	Astana	+ 14"
7	Francisco Ventoso (ESP)	Movistar Team	+ 14"
8	Manuele Mori (ITA)	Lampre–ISD	+ 14"
9	Alessandro Ballan (ITA)	BMC Racing Team	+ 14"
10	Greg Henderson (NZL)	Team Sky	+ 14"

=== Stage 4, Norwood to Strathalbyn ===
Stage 4 Result

	Rider	Team	Time
1	Cameron Meyer (AUS)	Garmin–Cervélo	2h 57' 55"
2	Thomas De Gendt (BEL)	Vacansoleil–DCM	s.t.
3	Laurens ten Dam (NED)	Rabobank	+ 3"
4	Matthew Wilson (AUS)	Garmin–Cervélo	+ 10"
5	Matthew Goss (AUS)	HTC–Highroad	+ 24"
6	José Joaquín Rojas (ESP)	Movistar Team	+ 24"
7	Ben Swift (GBR)	Team Sky	+ 24"
8	Jürgen Roelandts (BEL)	Omega Pharma–Lotto	+ 24"
9	Nikolay Trusov (RUS)	Team Katusha	+ 24"
10	Romain Feillu (FRA)	Vacansoleil–DCM	+ 24"

General Classification after Stage 4

	Rider	Team	Time
1	Cameron Meyer (AUS)	Garmin–Cervélo	12h 54' 30"
2	Laurens ten Dam (NED)	Rabobank	+ 10"
3	Matthew Goss (AUS)	HTC–Highroad	+ 12"
4	Robbie McEwen (AUS)	Team RadioShack	+ 15"
5	André Greipel (GER)	Omega Pharma–Lotto	+ 16"
6	Michael Matthews (AUS)	Rabobank	+ 18"
7	Ben Swift (GBR)	Team Sky	+ 18"
8	Blel Kadri (FRA)	Ag2r–La Mondiale	+ 26"
9	Francisco Ventoso (ESP)	Movistar Team	+ 27"
10	Allan Davis (AUS)	Astana	+ 28"

=== Stage 5, McLaren Vale to Willunga ===
Stage 5 Result

	Rider	Team	Time
1	Francisco Ventoso (ESP)	Movistar Team	3h 06' 10"
2	Michael Matthews (AUS)	Rabobank	s.t.
3	Matthew Goss (AUS)	HTC–Highroad	s.t.
4	José Joaquín Rojas (ESP)	Movistar Team	s.t.
5	Luke Roberts (AUS)	UniSA-Australia	s.t.
6	Robert Hunter (RSA)	Team RadioShack	s.t.
7	Blel Kadri (FRA)	Ag2r–La Mondiale	s.t.
8	Alessandro Ballan (ITA)	BMC Racing Team	s.t.
9	Ben Hermans (BEL)	Team RadioShack	s.t.
10	Ben Swift (GBR)	Team Sky	s.t.

General Classification after Stage 5

	Rider	Team	Time
1	Cameron Meyer (AUS)	Garmin–Cervélo	16h 00' 40"
2	Matthew Goss (AUS)	HTC–Highroad	+ 8"
3	Laurens ten Dam (NED)	Rabobank	+ 10"
4	Michael Matthews (AUS)	Rabobank	+ 12"
5	Francisco Ventoso (ESP)	Movistar Team	+ 17"
6	Ben Swift (GBR)	Team Sky	+ 18"
7	Blel Kadri (FRA)	Ag2r–La Mondiale	+ 26"
8	André Greipel (GER)	Omega Pharma–Lotto	+ 27"
9	Allan Davis (AUS)	Astana	+ 28"
10	Luke Roberts (AUS)	UniSA-Australia	+ 28"

=== Stage 6, Adelaide to Adelaide ===
Stage 6 Result

	Rider	Team	Time
1	Ben Swift (GBR)	Team Sky	1h 53' 47"
2	Greg Henderson (NZL)	Team Sky	s.t.
3	Matthew Goss (AUS)	HTC–Highroad	s.t.
4	Robbie McEwen (AUS)	Team RadioShack	s.t.
5	Juan José Haedo (ARG)	Saxo Bank–SunGard	s.t.
6	Allan Davis (AUS)	Astana	s.t.
7	André Greipel (GER)	Omega Pharma–Lotto	s.t.
8	Romain Feillu (FRA)	Vacansoleil–DCM	s.t.
9	Davide Viganò (ITA)	Leopard Trek	s.t.
10	Jonathan Cantwell (AUS)	UniSA-Australia	s.t.

Final General Classification

	Rider	Team	Time
1	Cameron Meyer (AUS)	Garmin–Cervélo	17h 54' 27"
2	Matthew Goss (AUS)	HTC–Highroad	+ 2"
3	Ben Swift (GBR)	Team Sky	+ 8"
4	Michael Matthews (AUS)	Rabobank	+ 9"
5	Laurens ten Dam (NED)	Rabobank	+ 10"
6	Francisco Ventoso (ESP)	Movistar Team	+ 17"
7	André Greipel (GER)	Omega Pharma–Lotto	+ 26"
8	Blel Kadri (FRA)	Ag2r–La Mondiale	+ 26"
9	Allan Davis (AUS)	Astana	+ 27"
10	Luke Roberts (AUS)	UniSA-Australia	+ 28"

== Classification leadership ==
In the 2011 Tour Down Under, six different jerseys were awarded. For the general classification, calculated by adding each cyclist's finishing times on each stage, and allowing time bonuses for the first three finishers on each stage and in intermediate sprints, the leader received an ochre jersey. This classification was considered the most important of the Tour Down Under, and the winner was considered the winner of the Tour.

Additionally, there was a sprint classification, which awarded a blue jersey. In the sprint classification, cyclists earned points for finishing in the top three in a stage or intermediate sprint, with the top three finishers in the stage getting 8, 6, and 4 points respectively, and the top three in the intermediate sprints getting 6, 4, and 2.

There was also a mountains classification, which awarded a white jersey. In the mountains classifications, points were won by reaching the top of a mountain before other cyclists. Unlike most other cycling events, there was no categorization of climbs as each awards the same points (16, 12, 8, 6, and 4) to the first five riders past the summit.

The fourth jersey represented the young rider classification. This classification awarded a black jersey.

Due to UCI rules limiting the number of jersey awards to four, the above are the only jerseys awarded to riders which were then worn the next day during the stage. But there were two other jerseys. The first was the red jersey for the most aggressive rider. This award was comparable to the combativity award of the Tour de France. While the rider received a red jersey on the podium after the stage, he wore his normal jersey (unless holding one of the above four) in the next stage, with the aggressive rider award indicated by a red bib number.

The sixth and final jersey was for the teams classification. This jersey was not presented on the podiums daily, but it was awarded to the winning team at the end of the Tour. The teams classification was calculated by adding the times of each team's best four riders per stage per day. The jersey was blue.

Stage	Winner	General Classification	Mountains Classification	Sprint Classification	Young Rider Classification	Team Classification	Aggressive Rider
1	Matthew Goss	Matthew Goss	Luke Roberts	Matthew Goss	Matthew Goss	Team Sky	Simon Clarke
2	Ben Swift	Robbie McEwen	Luke Roberts	Mitchell Docker	Matthew Goss	Team Sky	Yuriy Krivtsov
3	Michael Matthews	Matthew Goss	Luke Roberts	Matthew Goss	Matthew Goss	Team Sky	Luke Durbridge
4	Cameron Meyer	Cameron Meyer	Luke Roberts	Thomas De Gendt	Cameron Meyer	Garmin–Cervélo	Thomas De Gendt
5	Francisco Ventoso	Cameron Meyer	Luke Roberts	Matthew Goss	Cameron Meyer	Movistar Team	Richie Porte
6	Ben Swift	Cameron Meyer	Luke Roberts	Matthew Goss	Cameron Meyer	Movistar Team	Stuart O'Grady
Final		Cameron Meyer	Luke Roberts	Matthew Goss	Cameron Meyer	Movistar Team	–
