= 2018 Tour Down Under =

2018 UCI World Tour, race 1 of 37

Race details
- Dates: 16–21 January 2018
- Stages: 6
- Distance: 783.8 km (487.0 mi)
- Winning time: 20h 03' 34"

Results
| Jersey awarded to the overall winner | Winner | Daryl Impey (RSA) | (Mitchelton–Scott) |
| | Second | Richie Porte (AUS) | (BMC Racing Team) |
| | Third | Tom-Jelte Slagter (NED) | (Team Dimension Data) |
| Jersey awarded to the mountains classification winner | Mountains | Nicholas Dlamini (RSA) | (Team Dimension Data) |
| Jersey awarded to the young rider classification winner | Young rider | Egan Bernal (COL) | (Team Sky) |
| Jersey awarded to the sprints classification winner | Sprints | Peter Sagan (SVK) | (Bora–Hansgrohe) |
| | Team | Bahrain–Merida | |

The 2018 Tour Down Under was a road cycling stage race, that took place between 16 and 21 January 2018 in and around Adelaide, South Australia. It was the 20th edition of the Tour Down Under and the first race of the 2018 UCI World Tour.

Daryl Impey (Mitchelton–Scott) became the first South African rider to win the race overall, after edging out BMC Racing Team's Richie Porte on countback after both riders completed the course in the same time. Porte won on Willunga Hill for the fifth year in succession, but Impey finished eight seconds in arrears in second position, which was enough to take the ochre jersey. The podium placings were completed by another former winner, Tom-Jelte Slagter of Team Dimension Data, who finished third on Willunga Hill, taking four bonus seconds that put him ahead of the four other competitors that he had finished with; Slagter finished 16 seconds down on Impey overall.

In the race's other classifications, world champion Peter Sagan (Bora–Hansgrohe) won the sprints classification, taking five top-five stage finishes during the event, including a stage win into Uraidla. Team Dimension Data's Nicholas Dlamini led the mountains classification from start to finish, while Egan Bernal of Team Sky took the young rider classification in his first start for the team, finishing sixth overall. The teams classification was won by Bahrain–Merida, who placed Gorka Izagirre in the top-ten overall.

== Participating teams ==
As the Tour Down Under was a UCI World Tour event, all eighteen UCI WorldTeams were invited automatically and obliged to enter a team in the race. One other team was given a wildcard entry into the race: UniSA–Australia. Each team was due to enter seven riders, for a total of 133 participants. However, Lotto–Soudal withdrew Bjorg Lambrecht from the race following an error with the UCI's anti-doping procedures, while Team Sky lost Kristoffer Halvorsen following a crash in the closing metres of the People's Choice Classic, which resulted in a fractured hand. As a result, 131 riders started the race.

Among the field were seven previous winners of the race, three of whom – Rohan Dennis, Simon Gerrans and Richie Porte – were racing for the BMC Racing Team. Other previous winners in the field were Luis León Sánchez (Astana), Lotto–Soudal rider André Greipel, Tom-Jelte Slagter of Team Dimension Data, and Mitchelton–Scott's Cameron Meyer.

UCI WorldTeams

- AG2R La Mondiale
- Astana
- Bahrain–Merida
- BMC Racing Team
- Bora–Hansgrohe
- Team Dimension Data
- EF Education First–Drapac p/b Cannondale
- Team Katusha–Alpecin
- Lotto–Soudal
- LottoNL–Jumbo
- Mitchelton–Scott
- Movistar Team
- Quick-Step Floors
- Team Sky
- Team Sunweb
- Trek–Segafredo
- UAE Team Emirates
- FDJ

Wildcard teams

- UniSA–Australia

== Route ==
The route of the 2018 Tour Down Under was announced at the beginning of July 2017 and centred around the city of Adelaide in South Australia. There were six mass-start road stages and no time trials. Two days before the start of the Tour, there was a flat criterium race, the People's Choice Classic, which took place in Rymill Park and which was suited for the sprinters. It was won by world champion Peter Sagan (Bora–Hansgrohe) in a sprint finish.

The opening stage started in Port Adelaide, which hosted the race for the first time since the inaugural Tour Down Under in 1999. The fifth stage finished with two climbs of Willunga Hill, which had been decisive in previous editions of the race. The final stage was another criterium around the centre of Adelaide.

After stage two, it was announced that the third stage would be shortened due to forecasted high temperatures. Two of the three finishing circuits around Victor Harbor were removed from the itinerary, reducing the racing to 120.5 km (75 mi).

Stage schedule
| Stage | Date | Route | Distance | Type | Winner |
|---|---|---|---|---|---|
| 1 | 16 January | Port Adelaide to Lyndoch | 145 km (90 mi) | Flat stage | André Greipel (GER) |
| 2 | 17 January | Unley to Stirling | 148.6 km (92 mi) | Hilly stage | Caleb Ewan (AUS) |
| 3 | 18 January | Glenelg to Victor Harbor | 120.5 km (75 mi) (Note: Stage reduced from 146.5 km (91 mi), due to extreme heat.) | Flat stage | Elia Viviani (ITA) |
| 4 | 19 January | Norwood to Uraidla | 128.2 km (80 mi) | Hilly stage | Peter Sagan (SVK) |
| 5 | 20 January | McLaren Vale to Willunga Hill | 151.5 km (94 mi) | Medium-mountain stage | Richie Porte (AUS) |
| 6 | 21 January | Adelaide | 90 km (56 mi) | Flat stage | André Greipel (GER) |

== Stages ==
=== Stage 1 ===
16 January 2018 — Port Adelaide to Lyndoch, 145 km (90 mi)

Result of Stage 1
| Rank | Rider | Team | Time |
|---|---|---|---|
| 1 | André Greipel (GER) | Lotto–Soudal | 3h 50' 21" |
| 2 | Caleb Ewan (AUS) | Mitchelton–Scott | + 0" |
| 3 | Peter Sagan (SVK) | Bora–Hansgrohe | + 0" |
| 4 | Elia Viviani (ITA) | Quick-Step Floors | + 0" |
| 5 | Simone Consonni (ITA) | UAE Team Emirates | + 0" |
| 6 | Phil Bauhaus (GER) | Team Sunweb | + 0" |
| 7 | Nathan Haas (AUS) | Team Katusha–Alpecin | + 0" |
| 8 | Matteo Montaguti (ITA) | AG2R La Mondiale | + 0" |
| 9 | Ramūnas Navardauskas (LTU) | Bahrain–Merida | + 0" |
| 10 | Riccardo Minali (ITA) | Astana | + 0" |

General classification after Stage 1
| Rank | Rider | Team | Time |
|---|---|---|---|
| 1 | André Greipel (GER) | Lotto–Soudal | 3h 50' 11" |
| 2 | Caleb Ewan (AUS) | Mitchelton–Scott | + 4" |
| 3 | Will Clarke (AUS) | EF Education First–Drapac p/b Cannondale | + 4" |
| 4 | Peter Sagan (SVK) | Bora–Hansgrohe | + 6" |
| 5 | Nicholas Dlamini (RSA) | Team Dimension Data | + 6" |
| 6 | Nathan Haas (AUS) | Team Katusha–Alpecin | + 9" |
| 7 | Jhonatan Restrepo (COL) | Team Katusha–Alpecin | + 9" |
| 8 | Elia Viviani (ITA) | Quick-Step Floors | + 10" |
| 9 | Simone Consonni (ITA) | UAE Team Emirates | + 10" |
| 10 | Phil Bauhaus (GER) | Team Sunweb | + 10" |

=== Stage 2 ===
17 January 2018 — Unley to Stirling, 148.6 km (92 mi)

Result of Stage 2
| Rank | Rider | Team | Time |
|---|---|---|---|
| 1 | Caleb Ewan (AUS) | Mitchelton–Scott | 4h 03' 55" |
| 2 | Daryl Impey (RSA) | Mitchelton–Scott | + 0" |
| 3 | Jay McCarthy (AUS) | Bora–Hansgrohe | + 0" |
| 4 | Peter Sagan (SVK) | Bora–Hansgrohe | + 0" |
| 5 | Nathan Haas (AUS) | Team Katusha–Alpecin | + 0" |
| 6 | Elia Viviani (ITA) | Quick-Step Floors | + 0" |
| 7 | Gorka Izagirre (ESP) | Bahrain–Merida | + 0" |
| 8 | Domenico Pozzovivo (ITA) | Bahrain–Merida | + 0" |
| 9 | Luis León Sánchez (ESP) | Astana | + 0" |
| 10 | Carlos Barbero (ESP) | Movistar Team | + 0" |

General classification after Stage 2
| Rank | Rider | Team | Time |
|---|---|---|---|
| 1 | Caleb Ewan (AUS) | Mitchelton–Scott | 7h 54' 00" |
| 2 | Daryl Impey (RSA) | Mitchelton–Scott | + 10" |
| 3 | Peter Sagan (SVK) | Bora–Hansgrohe | + 12" |
| 4 | Jay McCarthy (AUS) | Bora–Hansgrohe | + 12" |
| 5 | Nathan Haas (AUS) | Team Katusha–Alpecin | + 15" |
| 6 | Jhonatan Restrepo (COL) | Team Katusha–Alpecin | + 15" |
| 7 | Elia Viviani (ITA) | Quick-Step Floors | + 16" |
| 8 | Simone Consonni (ITA) | UAE Team Emirates | + 16" |
| 9 | Carlos Barbero (ESP) | Movistar Team | + 16" |
| 10 | Anthony Roux (FRA) | FDJ | + 16" |

=== Stage 3 ===
18 January 2018 — Glenelg to Victor Harbor, 120.5 km (74.9 mi)

Result of Stage 3
| Rank | Rider | Team | Time |
|---|---|---|---|
| 1 | Elia Viviani (ITA) | Quick-Step Floors | 3h 04' 40" |
| 2 | Phil Bauhaus (GER) | Team Sunweb | + 0" |
| 3 | Caleb Ewan (AUS) | Mitchelton–Scott | + 0" |
| 4 | Simone Consonni (ITA) | UAE Team Emirates | + 0" |
| 5 | Peter Sagan (SVK) | Bora–Hansgrohe | + 0" |
| 6 | Simon Clarke (AUS) | EF Education First–Drapac p/b Cannondale | + 0" |
| 7 | Alex Edmondson (AUS) | Mitchelton–Scott | + 0" |
| 8 | Zak Dempster (AUS) | UniSA–Australia | + 0" |
| 9 | Dries Devenyns (BEL) | Quick-Step Floors | + 0" |
| 10 | Jay McCarthy (AUS) | Bora–Hansgrohe | + 0" |

General classification after Stage 3
| Rank | Rider | Team | Time |
|---|---|---|---|
| 1 | Caleb Ewan (AUS) | Mitchelton–Scott | 10h 58' 36" |
| 2 | Elia Viviani (ITA) | Quick-Step Floors | + 10" |
| 3 | Daryl Impey (RSA) | Mitchelton–Scott | + 14" |
| 4 | Jay McCarthy (AUS) | Bora–Hansgrohe | + 15" |
| 5 | Peter Sagan (SVK) | Bora–Hansgrohe | + 16" |
| 6 | Nathan Haas (AUS) | Team Katusha–Alpecin | + 17" |
| 7 | Jhonatan Restrepo (COL) | Team Katusha–Alpecin | + 19" |
| 8 | Simone Consonni (ITA) | UAE Team Emirates | + 20" |
| 9 | Robert Gesink (NED) | LottoNL–Jumbo | + 20" |
| 10 | Anthony Roux (FRA) | FDJ | + 20" |

=== Stage 4 ===
19 January 2018 — Norwood to Uraidla, 128.2 km (80 mi)

Result of Stage 4
| Rank | Rider | Team | Time |
|---|---|---|---|
| 1 | Peter Sagan (SVK) | Bora–Hansgrohe | 3h 21' 07" |
| 2 | Daryl Impey (RSA) | Mitchelton–Scott | + 0" |
| 3 | Luis León Sánchez (ESP) | Astana | + 0" |
| 4 | Diego Ulissi (ITA) | UAE Team Emirates | + 0" |
| 5 | Jay McCarthy (AUS) | Bora–Hansgrohe | + 0" |
| 6 | Dries Devenyns (BEL) | Quick-Step Floors | + 0" |
| 7 | Domenico Pozzovivo (ITA) | Bahrain–Merida | + 0" |
| 8 | Rui Costa (POR) | UAE Team Emirates | + 0" |
| 9 | Pierre Latour (FRA) | AG2R La Mondiale | + 0" |
| 10 | Laurent Didier (LUX) | Trek–Segafredo | + 0" |

General classification after Stage 4
| Rank | Rider | Team | Time |
|---|---|---|---|
| 1 | Peter Sagan (SVK) | Bora–Hansgrohe | 14h 19' 49" |
| 2 | Daryl Impey (RSA) | Mitchelton–Scott | + 2" |
| 3 | Jay McCarthy (AUS) | Bora–Hansgrohe | + 9" |
| 4 | Luis León Sánchez (ESP) | Astana | + 10" |
| 5 | Diego Ulissi (ITA) | UAE Team Emirates | + 14" |
| 6 | Robert Gesink (NED) | LottoNL–Jumbo | + 14" |
| 7 | Rui Costa (POR) | UAE Team Emirates | + 14" |
| 8 | George Bennett (NZL) | LottoNL–Jumbo | + 14" |
| 9 | Dries Devenyns (BEL) | Quick-Step Floors | + 14" |
| 10 | Egan Bernal (COL) | Team Sky | + 14" |

=== Stage 5 ===
20 January 2018 — McLaren Vale to Willunga Hill, 151.5 km (94 mi)

Result of Stage 5
| Rank | Rider | Team | Time |
|---|---|---|---|
| 1 | Richie Porte (AUS) | BMC Racing Team | 3h 42' 22" |
| 2 | Daryl Impey (RSA) | Mitchelton–Scott | + 8" |
| 3 | Tom-Jelte Slagter (NED) | Team Dimension Data | + 10" |
| 4 | Dries Devenyns (BEL) | Quick-Step Floors | + 10" |
| 5 | Egan Bernal (COL) | Team Sky | + 10" |
| 6 | Gorka Izagirre (ESP) | Bahrain–Merida | + 10" |
| 7 | Diego Ulissi (ITA) | UAE Team Emirates | + 10" |
| 8 | Robert Gesink (NED) | LottoNL–Jumbo | + 14" |
| 9 | Ion Izagirre (ESP) | Bahrain–Merida | + 14" |
| 10 | Ruben Guerreiro (POR) | Trek–Segafredo | + 14" |

General classification after Stage 5
| Rank | Rider | Team | Time |
|---|---|---|---|
| 1 | Daryl Impey (RSA) | Mitchelton–Scott | 18h 02' 15" |
| 2 | Richie Porte (AUS) | BMC Racing Team | + 0" |
| 3 | Tom-Jelte Slagter (NED) | Team Dimension Data | + 16" |
| 4 | Diego Ulissi (ITA) | UAE Team Emirates | + 20" |
| 5 | Dries Devenyns (BEL) | Quick-Step Floors | + 20" |
| 6 | Egan Bernal (COL) | Team Sky | + 20" |
| 7 | Gorka Izagirre (ESP) | Bahrain–Merida | + 20" |
| 8 | Robert Gesink (NED) | LottoNL–Jumbo | + 24" |
| 9 | George Bennett (NZL) | LottoNL–Jumbo | + 24" |
| 10 | Ion Izagirre (ESP) | Bahrain–Merida | + 24" |

=== Stage 6 ===
21 January 2018 — Adelaide, 90 km (56 mi)

Result of Stage 6
| Rank | Rider | Team | Time |
|---|---|---|---|
| 1 | André Greipel (GER) | Lotto–Soudal | 2h 01' 19" |
| 2 | Caleb Ewan (AUS) | Mitchelton–Scott | + 0" |
| 3 | Peter Sagan (SVK) | Bora–Hansgrohe | + 0" |
| 4 | Phil Bauhaus (GER) | Team Sunweb | + 0" |
| 5 | Elia Viviani (ITA) | Quick-Step Floors | + 0" |
| 6 | Steele Von Hoff (AUS) | UniSA–Australia | + 0" |
| 7 | Simone Consonni (ITA) | UAE Team Emirates | + 0" |
| 8 | Mads Pedersen (DEN) | Trek–Segafredo | + 0" |
| 9 | Carlos Barbero (ESP) | Movistar Team | + 0" |
| 10 | Mads Würtz Schmidt (DEN) | Team Katusha–Alpecin | + 0" |

Final general classification
| Rank | Rider | Team | Time |
|---|---|---|---|
| 1 | Daryl Impey (RSA) | Mitchelton–Scott | 20h 03' 34" |
| 2 | Richie Porte (AUS) | BMC Racing Team | + 0" |
| 3 | Tom-Jelte Slagter (NED) | Team Dimension Data | + 16" |
| 4 | Diego Ulissi (ITA) | UAE Team Emirates | + 20" |
| 5 | Dries Devenyns (BEL) | Quick-Step Floors | + 20" |
| 6 | Egan Bernal (COL) | Team Sky | + 20" |
| 7 | Gorka Izagirre (ESP) | Bahrain–Merida | + 20" |
| 8 | Luis León Sánchez (ESP) | Astana | + 23" |
| 9 | Ruben Guerreiro (POR) | Trek–Segafredo | + 23" |
| 10 | Robert Gesink (NED) | LottoNL–Jumbo | + 24" |

== Classification leadership table ==
In the 2018 Tour Down Under, four different jerseys were awarded. For the general classification, calculated by adding each cyclist's finishing times on each stage, and allowing time bonuses for the first three finishers at intermediate sprints and at the finish of mass-start stages, the leader received an ochre jersey. This classification was considered the most important of the 2018 Tour Down Under, and the winner of the classification was considered the winner of the race.

Additionally, there was a sprints classification, which awarded a green jersey, a change from red in 2017. In the sprints classification, cyclists received points for finishing in the top 10 in a stage. For winning a stage, a rider earned 15 points, with one point fewer per place down to 6 points for 10th place. Points towards the classification could also be accrued at intermediate sprint points during each stage; these intermediate sprints also offered bonus seconds towards the general classification. There was also a mountains classification, the leadership of which was marked by a white jersey with navy polka dots. In the mountains classification, points were won by reaching the top of a climb before other cyclists, with more points available for the higher-categorised climbs.

The fourth jersey represented the young rider classification, marked by a white jersey. This was decided in the same way as the general classification, but only riders born after 1 January 1994 were eligible to be ranked in the classification. There was also a classification for teams, in which the times of the best three cyclists per team on each stage were added together; the leading team at the end of the race was the team with the lowest total time. In addition, there was a combativity award given after each stage to the rider(s) considered, by a jury, to have "instigated the most attacks, breakaways or assisted their teammates to the best advantage".

| Stage | Winner | General classification | Mountains classification | Sprint classification | Young rider classification | Most competitive rider(s) | Team classification |
|---|---|---|---|---|---|---|---|
| 1 | André Greipel | André Greipel | Nicholas Dlamini | André Greipel | Caleb Ewan | Will Clarke | Bora–Hansgrohe |
| 2 | Caleb Ewan | Caleb Ewan | Nicholas Dlamini | Caleb Ewan | Caleb Ewan | Jaime Castrillo | Bahrain–Merida |
| 3 | Elia Viviani | Caleb Ewan | Nicholas Dlamini | Caleb Ewan | Caleb Ewan | Scott Bowden | Bahrain–Merida |
| 4 | Peter Sagan | Peter Sagan | Nicholas Dlamini | Peter Sagan | Egan Bernal | Zak Dempster | Bahrain–Merida |
| 5 | Richie Porte | Daryl Impey | Nicholas Dlamini | Peter Sagan | Egan Bernal | Thomas De Gendt | Bahrain–Merida |
| 6 | André Greipel | Daryl Impey | Nicholas Dlamini | Peter Sagan | Egan Bernal | Logan Owen | Bahrain–Merida |
| Final | | Daryl Impey | Nicholas Dlamini | Peter Sagan | Egan Bernal | No final award | Bahrain–Merida |
