= 2017 Tour Down Under =

Cycling race

2017 UCI World Tour, race 1 of 37

Race details
- Dates: 17–22 January 2017
- Stages: 6
- Distance: 802 km (498 mi)
- Winning time: 19h 55' 49"

Results
Jersey awarded to the overall winner	Winner	Richie Porte (Australia)	(BMC Racing Team)
	Second	Esteban Chaves (Colombia)	(Orica–Scott)
	Third	Jay McCarthy (Australia)	(Bora–Hansgrohe)
Jersey awarded to the mountains classification winner	Mountains	Thomas De Gendt (Belgium)	(Lotto–Soudal)
Jersey awarded to the young rider classification winner	Young rider	Jhonatan Restrepo (Colombia)	(Team Katusha–Alpecin)
Jersey awarded to the sprints classification winner	Sprints	Caleb Ewan (Australia)	(Orica–Scott)
	Team	UniSA–Australia	

The 2017 Tour Down Under was a road cycling stage race that took place between 17 and 22 January 2017 in and around Adelaide, South Australia. It was the 19th edition of the Tour Down Under and was the first event of the 2017 UCI World Tour.

BMC Racing Team rider Richie Porte won the race for the first time, holding the race lead from the second day onwards following his stage win into Paracombe. Porte added a second stage win – the queen stage at Willunga Hill – as he ultimately won the race by 48 seconds ahead of his closest challenger. Orica–Scott's Esteban Chaves finished in second place, having taken third-place finishes in both of the stages won by Porte; third place on the podium was decided on the final day of the race. Jay McCarthy (Bora–Hansgrohe) trailed Nathan Haas of Team Dimension Data by three seconds, but McCarthy was able to win the first intermediate sprint of the day – offering three bonus seconds towards the general classification – after a lead-out from world champion teammate Peter Sagan. With McCarthy and Haas finishing tied on time, the final podium position went to McCarthy on countback.

In the race's other classifications, Chaves' Orica–Scott teammate Caleb Ewan won the sprints classification, winning four of the six stages during the race, becoming the third rider (and the youngest) to do so after his compatriot Robbie McEwen in 2002 and André Greipel in 2008, while Thomas De Gendt (Lotto–Soudal) won the mountains classification on the final day, taking points on the first climb of Montefiore Hill to assume the lead from Porte. Colombian Jhonatan Restrepo of Team Katusha–Alpecin was the winner of the young rider classification, finishing in tenth place overall, while the teams classification was won by the only non-UCI WorldTeam in the race, UniSA–Australia.

== Participating teams ==
As the Tour Down Under was a UCI World Tour event, all eighteen UCI WorldTeams were invited automatically and obliged to enter a team in the race. One other team was given a wildcard entry into the race: UniSA–Australia.

UCI WorldTeams

- AG2R La Mondiale
- Astana
- Bahrain–Merida
- BMC Racing Team
- Bora–Hansgrohe
- Cannondale–Drapac
- Team Dimension Data
- Quick-Step Floors
- FDJ
- Lotto–Soudal
- Movistar Team
- Orica–Scott
- Team Sunweb
- Team Katusha–Alpecin
- LottoNL–Jumbo
- Team Sky
- Trek–Segafredo
- UAE Abu Dhabi

Wildcard teams

- UniSA–Australia

== Route ==
The route of the 2017 Tour Down Under was announced at the beginning of July 2016 and centred around the city of Adelaide in South Australia. There were six mass-start road stages and no time trials. Two days before the start of the Tour, there was a flat criterium race, the People's Choice Classic, which took place in Rymill Park and which was suited for the sprinters. It was won by Caleb Ewan (Orica–Scott) in a sprint finish. The first five stages of the race itself included at least some climbing, and a few opportunities for the sprinters, especially stage one. Several stages of the Tour included climbs early in the stage and hilly circuits at the end. The second stage reversed this with circuits at the beginning and a climb immediately before the finish. The fifth stage finished with two climbs of Willunga Hill, which had been decisive in previous editions of the race. The final stage was another criterium around the centre of Adelaide.

Stage schedule
Stage	Date	Route	Distance	Type	Winner
1	17 January	Unley to Lyndoch	118.5 km (74 mi) (Note: Stage reduced from 145 km (90 mi) due to extreme heat.)	Hilly stage	Caleb Ewan (AUS)
2	18 January	Stirling to Paracombe	148.5 km (92 mi)	Medium-mountain stage	Richie Porte (AUS)
3	19 January	Glenelg to Victor Harbor	144 km (89 mi)	Hilly stage	Caleb Ewan (AUS)
4	20 January	Norwood to Campbelltown	149.5 km (93 mi)	Medium-mountain stage	Caleb Ewan (AUS)
5	21 January	McLaren Vale to Willunga Hill	151.5 km (94 mi)	Medium-mountain stage	Richie Porte (AUS)
6	22 January	Adelaide	90 km (56 mi)	Flat stage	Caleb Ewan (AUS)

== Stages ==
=== Stage 1 ===
17 January 2017 — Unley to Lyndoch, 118.5 km (73.6 mi)

Result of Stage 1
Rank	Rider	Team	Time
1	Caleb Ewan (AUS)	Orica–Scott	3h 24' 18"
2	Danny van Poppel (NED)	Team Sky	+ 0"
3	Sam Bennett (IRL)	Bora–Hansgrohe	+ 0"
4	Marko Kump (SLO)	UAE Abu Dhabi	+ 0"
5	Niccolò Bonifazio (ITA)	Bahrain–Merida	+ 0"
6	Nikias Arndt (GER)	Team Sunweb	+ 0"
7	Baptiste Planckaert (BEL)	Team Katusha–Alpecin	+ 0"
8	Edward Theuns (BEL)	Trek–Segafredo	+ 0"
9	Miles Scotson (AUS)	BMC Racing Team	+ 0"
10	Sean De Bie (BEL)	Lotto–Soudal	+ 0"

General classification after Stage 1
Rank	Rider	Team	Time
1	Caleb Ewan (AUS)	Orica–Scott	3h 24' 08"
2	Danny van Poppel (NED)	Team Sky	+ 4"
3	Sam Bennett (IRL)	Bora–Hansgrohe	+ 6"
4	Jay McCarthy (AUS)	Bora–Hansgrohe	+ 7"
5	Nathan Haas (AUS)	Team Dimension Data	+ 8"
6	Simon Gerrans (AUS)	Orica–Scott	+ 8"
7	José Gonçalves (POR)	Team Katusha–Alpecin	+ 8"
8	Marko Kump (SLO)	UAE Abu Dhabi	+ 10"
9	Niccolò Bonifazio (ITA)	Bahrain–Merida	+ 10"
10	Nikias Arndt (GER)	Team Sunweb	+ 10"

=== Stage 2 ===
18 January 2017 — Stirling to Paracombe, 148.5 km (92.3 mi)

Result of Stage 2
Rank	Rider	Team	Time
1	Richie Porte (AUS)	BMC Racing Team	3h 46' 06"
2	Gorka Izagirre (ESP)	Movistar Team	+ 16"
3	Esteban Chaves (COL)	Orica–Scott	+ 16"
4	Rohan Dennis (AUS)	BMC Racing Team	+ 19"
5	Nathan Haas (AUS)	Team Dimension Data	+ 19"
6	Diego Ulissi (ITA)	UAE Abu Dhabi	+ 19"
7	Ruben Guerreiro (POR)	Trek–Segafredo	+ 19"
8	Michael Storer (AUS)	UniSA–Australia	+ 19"
9	Michael Woods (CAN)	Cannondale–Drapac	+ 19"
10	Luis León Sánchez (ESP)	Astana	+ 19"

General classification after Stage 2
Rank	Rider	Team	Time
1	Richie Porte (AUS)	BMC Racing Team	7h 10' 14"
2	Gorka Izagirre (ESP)	Movistar Team	+ 20"
3	Esteban Chaves (COL)	Orica–Scott	+ 22"
4	Jay McCarthy (AUS)	Bora–Hansgrohe	+ 24"
5	Nathan Haas (AUS)	Team Dimension Data	+ 27"
6	Diego Ulissi (ITA)	UAE Abu Dhabi	+ 29"
7	Nathan Earle (AUS)	UniSA–Australia	+ 29"
8	Rohan Dennis (AUS)	BMC Racing Team	+ 29"
9	Luis León Sánchez (ESP)	Astana	+ 29"
10	Rafael Valls (ESP)	Lotto–Soudal	+ 29"

=== Stage 3 ===
19 January 2017 — Glenelg to Victor Harbor, 144 km (89.5 mi)

Result of Stage 3
Rank	Rider	Team	Time
1	Caleb Ewan (AUS)	Orica–Scott	3h 24' 45"
2	Peter Sagan (SVK)	Bora–Hansgrohe	+ 0"
3	Niccolò Bonifazio (ITA)	Bahrain–Merida	+ 0"
4	Danny van Poppel (NED)	Team Sky	+ 0"
5	Edward Theuns (BEL)	Trek–Segafredo	+ 0"
6	Nikias Arndt (GER)	Team Sunweb	+ 0"
7	Sean De Bie (BEL)	Lotto–Soudal	+ 0"
8	Lorrenzo Manzin (FRA)	FDJ	+ 0"
9	Ruben Guerreiro (POR)	Trek–Segafredo	+ 0"
10	Baptiste Planckaert (BEL)	Team Katusha–Alpecin	+ 0"

General classification after Stage 3
Rank	Rider	Team	Time
1	Richie Porte (AUS)	BMC Racing Team	10h 34' 59"
2	Gorka Izagirre (ESP)	Movistar Team	+ 20"
3	Esteban Chaves (COL)	Orica–Scott	+ 22"
4	Jay McCarthy (AUS)	Bora–Hansgrohe	+ 24"
5	Nathan Haas (AUS)	Team Dimension Data	+ 27"
6	Rohan Dennis (AUS)	BMC Racing Team	+ 29"
7	Luis León Sánchez (ESP)	Astana	+ 29"
8	Diego Ulissi (ITA)	UAE Abu Dhabi	+ 29"
9	Rafael Valls (ESP)	Lotto–Soudal	+ 29"
10	Robert Gesink (NED)	LottoNL–Jumbo	+ 29"

=== Stage 4 ===
20 January 2017 — Norwood to Campbelltown, 149.5 km (93 mi)

Result of Stage 4
Rank	Rider	Team	Time
1	Caleb Ewan (AUS)	Orica–Scott	3h 45' 19"
2	Peter Sagan (SVK)	Bora–Hansgrohe	+ 0"
3	Danny van Poppel (NED)	Team Sky	+ 0"
4	Ben Swift (GBR)	UAE Abu Dhabi	+ 0"
5	Nathan Haas (AUS)	Team Dimension Data	+ 0"
6	Baptiste Planckaert (BEL)	Team Katusha–Alpecin	+ 0"
7	Jay McCarthy (AUS)	Bora–Hansgrohe	+ 0"
8	Callum Scotson (AUS)	UniSA–Australia	+ 0"
9	Jasha Sütterlin (GER)	Movistar Team	+ 0"
10	Enrico Battaglin (ITA)	LottoNL–Jumbo	+ 0"

General classification after Stage 4
Rank	Rider	Team	Time
1	Richie Porte (AUS)	BMC Racing Team	14h 20' 18"
2	Gorka Izagirre (ESP)	Movistar Team	+ 20"
3	Esteban Chaves (COL)	Orica–Scott	+ 22"
4	Jay McCarthy (AUS)	Bora–Hansgrohe	+ 24"
5	Nathan Haas (AUS)	Team Dimension Data	+ 27"
6	Rohan Dennis (AUS)	BMC Racing Team	+ 29"
7	Luis León Sánchez (ESP)	Astana	+ 29"
8	Diego Ulissi (ITA)	UAE Abu Dhabi	+ 29"
9	Rafael Valls (ESP)	Lotto–Soudal	+ 29"
10	Ruben Guerreiro (POR)	Trek–Segafredo	+ 29"

=== Stage 5 ===
21 January 2017 — McLaren Vale to Willunga Hill, 151.5 km (94 mi)

Result of Stage 5
Rank	Rider	Team	Time
1	Richie Porte (AUS)	BMC Racing Team	3h 40' 13"
2	Nathan Haas (AUS)	Team Dimension Data	+ 20"
3	Esteban Chaves (COL)	Orica–Scott	+ 20"
4	Diego Ulissi (ITA)	UAE Abu Dhabi	+ 20"
5	Jay McCarthy (AUS)	Bora–Hansgrohe	+ 20"
6	Nathan Earle (AUS)	UniSA–Australia	+ 23"
7	Rafael Valls (ESP)	Lotto–Soudal	+ 23"
8	Sergio Henao (COL)	Team Sky	+ 23"
9	Robert Gesink (NED)	LottoNL–Jumbo	+ 23"
10	Tom-Jelte Slagter (NED)	Cannondale–Drapac	+ 23"

General classification after Stage 5
Rank	Rider	Team	Time
1	Richie Porte (AUS)	BMC Racing Team	18h 00' 21"
2	Esteban Chaves (COL)	Orica–Scott	+ 48"
3	Nathan Haas (AUS)	Team Dimension Data	+ 51"
4	Jay McCarthy (AUS)	Bora–Hansgrohe	+ 54"
5	Diego Ulissi (ITA)	UAE Abu Dhabi	+ 59"
6	Rohan Dennis (AUS)	BMC Racing Team	+ 1' 02"
7	Rafael Valls (ESP)	Lotto–Soudal	+ 1' 02"
8	Robert Gesink (NED)	LottoNL–Jumbo	+ 1' 02"
9	Wilco Kelderman (NED)	Team Sunweb	+ 1' 02"
10	Nathan Earle (AUS)	UniSA–Australia	+ 1' 06"

=== Stage 6 ===
22 January 2017 — Adelaide, 90 km (56 mi)

Result of Stage 6
Rank	Rider	Team	Time
1	Caleb Ewan (AUS)	Orica–Scott	1h 55' 28"
2	Peter Sagan (SVK)	Bora–Hansgrohe	+ 0"
3	Marko Kump (SLO)	UAE Abu Dhabi	+ 0"
4	Danny van Poppel (NED)	Team Sky	+ 0"
5	Sean De Bie (BEL)	Lotto–Soudal	+ 0"
6	Lorrenzo Manzin (FRA)	FDJ	+ 0"
7	Koen de Kort (NED)	Trek–Segafredo	+ 0"
8	Jasha Sütterlin (GER)	Movistar Team	+ 0"
9	Nathan Haas (AUS)	Team Dimension Data	+ 0"
10	Jay McCarthy (AUS)	Bora–Hansgrohe	+ 0"

Final general classification
Rank	Rider	Team	Time
1	Richie Porte (AUS)	BMC Racing Team	19h 55' 49"
2	Esteban Chaves (COL)	Orica–Scott	+ 48"
3	Jay McCarthy (AUS)	Bora–Hansgrohe	+ 51"
4	Nathan Haas (AUS)	Team Dimension Data	+ 51"
5	Diego Ulissi (ITA)	UAE Abu Dhabi	+ 59"
6	Rohan Dennis (AUS)	BMC Racing Team	+ 1' 02"
7	Rafael Valls (ESP)	Lotto–Soudal	+ 1' 02"
8	Robert Gesink (NED)	LottoNL–Jumbo	+ 1' 02"
9	Wilco Kelderman (NED)	Team Sunweb	+ 1' 02"
10	Jhonatan Restrepo (COL)	Team Katusha–Alpecin	+ 1' 04"

== Classification leadership table ==
In the 2017 Tour Down Under, four different jerseys were awarded. For the general classification, calculated by adding each cyclist's finishing times on each stage, and allowing time bonuses for the first three finishers at intermediate sprints and at the finish of mass-start stages, the leader received an ochre jersey. This classification was considered the most important of the 2017 Tour Down Under, and the winner of the classification was considered the winner of the race.

Additionally, there was a sprints classification, which awarded a red jersey. In the sprints classification, cyclists received points for finishing in the top 15 in a stage. For winning a stage, a rider earned 15 points, with one point fewer per place down to a single point for 15th place. Points towards the classification could also be accrued at intermediate sprint points during each stage; these intermediate sprints also offered bonus seconds towards the general classification. There was also a mountains classification, the leadership of which was marked by a white jersey with navy polka dots. In the mountains classification, points were won by reaching the top of a climb before other cyclists, with more points available for the higher-categorised climbs.

The fourth jersey represented the young rider classification, marked by a white jersey. This was decided in the same way as the general classification, but only riders born after 1 January 1993 were eligible to be ranked in the classification. There was also a classification for teams, in which the times of the best three cyclists per team on each stage were added together; the leading team at the end of the race was the team with the lowest total time. In addition, there was a combativity award given after each stage to the rider(s) considered, by a jury, to have "instigated the most attacks, breakaways or assisted their teammates to the best advantage".

Stage	Winner	General classification	Mountains classification	Sprint classification	Young rider classification	Most competitive rider(s)	Team classification
1	Caleb Ewan	Caleb Ewan	Laurens De Vreese	Caleb Ewan	Caleb Ewan	Laurens De Vreese	Bora–Hansgrohe
2	Richie Porte	Richie Porte	Richie Porte	Richie Porte	Ruben Guerreiro	Jasha Sütterlin	UniSA–Australia
3	Caleb Ewan	Richie Porte	Richie Porte	Caleb Ewan	Ruben Guerreiro	Vegard Stake Laengen	UniSA–Australia
4	Caleb Ewan	Richie Porte	Richie Porte	Caleb Ewan	Ruben Guerreiro	Jack Bauer & Cameron Meyer	UniSA–Australia
5	Richie Porte	Richie Porte	Richie Porte	Caleb Ewan	Jhonatan Restrepo	Jack Bauer	UniSA–Australia
6	Caleb Ewan	Richie Porte	Thomas De Gendt	Caleb Ewan	Jhonatan Restrepo	Jack Bauer	UniSA–Australia
Final		Richie Porte	Thomas De Gendt	Caleb Ewan	Jhonatan Restrepo	No final award	UniSA–Australia
