= Emily Roper =

Emily Roper may refer to:

- Emily Herfoss, née Roper, Australian racing cyclist
- Emily Roper (gymnast), Welsh artistic gymnast
