= Nadia Quagliotto =

Italian cyclist (born 1997)

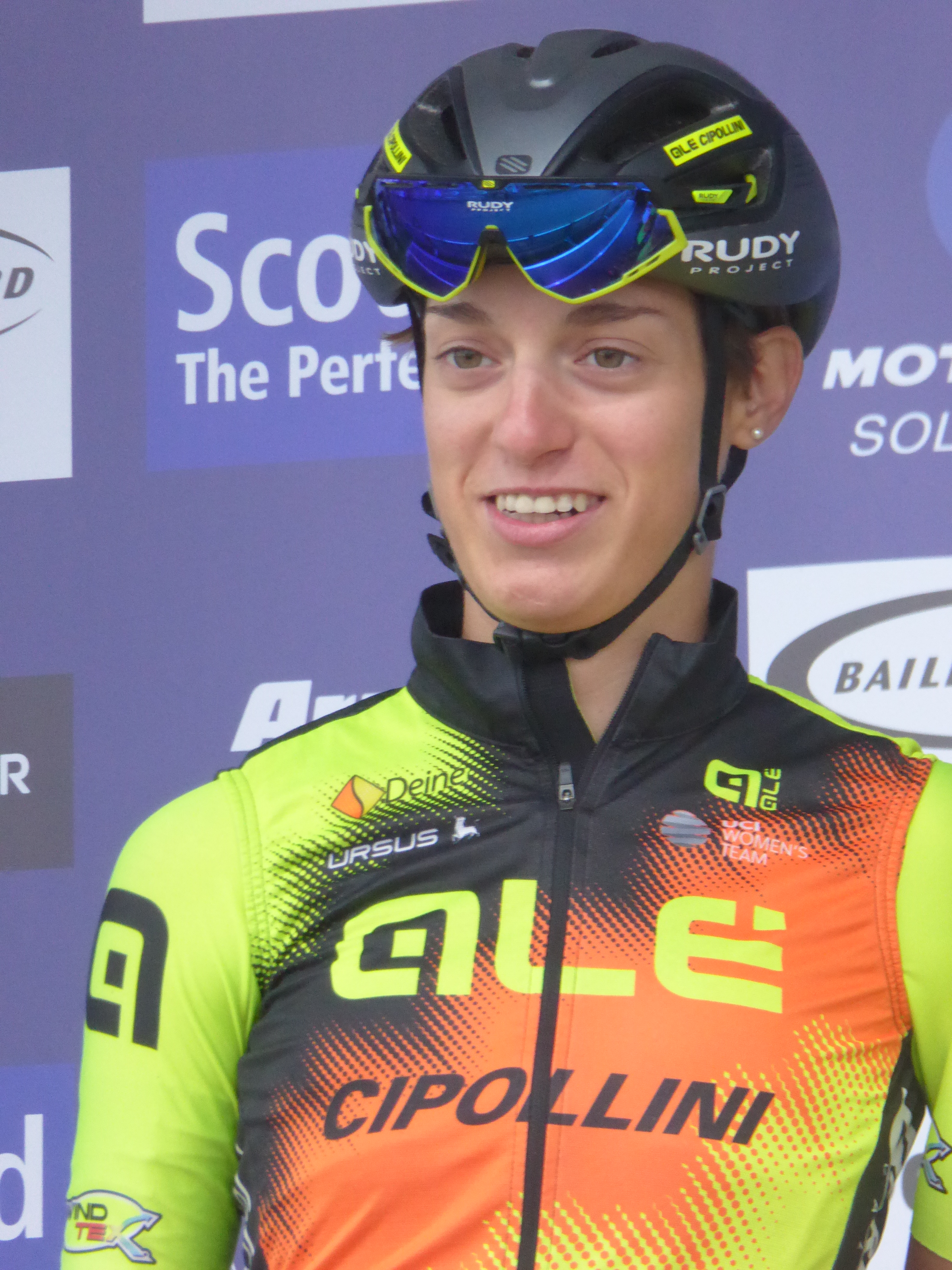
- Quagliotto at the 2019 Women's Tour of Scotland

Personal information
- Full name: Nadia Quagliotto
- Born: 22 March 1997 (age 29) Montebelluna, Italy

Cycling career
- Sport: Cycling
- Current team: Cofidis
- Discipline: Road
- Role: Rider
- Rider type: Puncheuse

Amateur team
- 2020: Casa Dorada Women Cycling

Professional teams
- 2016–2018: Top Girls Fassa Bortolo
- 2019: Alé–Cipollini
- 2020: Cronos–Casa Dorada
- 2021–2022: Bepink
- 2023–2024: Laboral Kutxa–Fundación Euskadi
- 2025–: Cofidis

Nadia Quagliotto (born 22 March 1997) is an Italian racing cyclist, who rides for UCI Women's ProTeam Cofidis.

== Major results ==
2014
3rd Road race, National Junior Road Championships
2015
1st Road race, UEC European Junior Road Championships
2017
8th Gran Premio Bruno Beghelli Internazionale Donne Elite
2018
5th Gran Premio della Liberazione
6th Road race, National Road Championships
2019
1st Mountains classification, Women's Tour Down Under
2021
3rd La Périgord Ladies
2022
8th Trofeo Oro in Euro
9th Navarra Women's Elite Classics
2023
4th reVolta
5th Grand Prix International d'Isbergues
5th Grand Prix de Wallonie
5th Grote Prijs Yvonne Reynders
9th Kreiz Breizh Elites Dames
2024
3rd Trofeo Binissalem–Andratx
4th Women Cycling Pro Costa De Almería
6th Vuelta a la Comunitat Valenciana Feminas
9th Tour of Guangxi
10th Classic Lorient Agglomération
10th Grand Prix de Wallonie
2025
6th Grand Prix du Morbihan Féminin
7th Festival Elsy Jacobs à Garnich
