= 2002 Tour Down Under =

4th edition of the Tour Down Under stage race

Race details
- Dates: 15–20 January 2002
- Stages: 6
- Winning time: 16h 59' 44"

Results
Jersey awarded to the overall winner	Winner	Michael Rogers (AUS)	(Team AIS)
	Second	Alexander Bocharov (RUS)	(AG2R Prévoyance)
	Third	Patrick Jonker (AUS)	(Team UniSA)
Jersey awarded to the points classification winner	Points	Robbie McEwen (AUS)	(Lotto–Adecco)
Jersey awarded to the mountains classification winner	Mountains	Cadel Evans (AUS)	(Mapei–Quick-Step)
Jersey awarded to the young rider classification winner	Young rider	Dave McPartland (AUS)	(United Water)
	Team	Mapei–Quick-Step	

The 2002 Tour Down Under was the fourth edition of the Tour Down Under stage race. It took place from 15 to 20 January in and around Adelaide, South Australia. This edition was won by Michael Rogers, who rode for Team AIS.

== Route ==
The route of the 2002 Tour Down Under is centred around the city of Adelaide in South Australia. There were six mass-start road stages and no time trials.

Stage schedule
Stage	Date	Route	Distance	Type	Winner
1	15 January	Glenelg	47 km (29 mi)	Flat stage	Robbie McEwen (AUS)
2	16 January	Hahndorf to Strathalbyn	150 km (93 mi)		Michael Rogers (AUS)
3	17 January	Willunga	149 km (93 mi)		Robbie McEwen (AUS)
4	18 January	Unley to Victor Harbor	141 km (88 mi)		Robbie McEwen (AUS)
5	19 January	Gawler to Tanunda	156 km (97 mi)		Cadel Evans (AUS)
6	20 January	Adelaide	90 km (56 mi)	Flat stage	Robbie McEwen (AUS)

== Stages ==
=== Stage 1 ===
15 January 2002 – Glenelg – Glenelg, 47 km

Stage and General Classification after Stage 1

	Cyclist	Team	Time
1	Robbie McEwen (AUS)	Lotto–Adecco	
2	Corey Sweet (AUS)	Team UniSA	s.t.
3	Jans Koerts (NED)	Domo-Farm Frites	s.t.
4	Max van Heeswijk (NED)	Domo-Farm Frites	s.t.
5	Glenn D'Hollander (NED)	Lotto–Adecco	s.t.
6	Julian Dean (NZL)	CSC–Tiscali	s.t.
7	Henk Vogels (AUS)	Team AIS	s.t.
8	Alexander Bocharov (RUS)	AG2R Prévoyance	s.t.
9	Fabio Sacchi (ITA)	Saeco–Longoni Sport	s.t.
10	Frédéric Guesdon (FRA)	Française des Jeux	s.t.
