= Rachel Neylan =

Australian cyclist (born 1982)

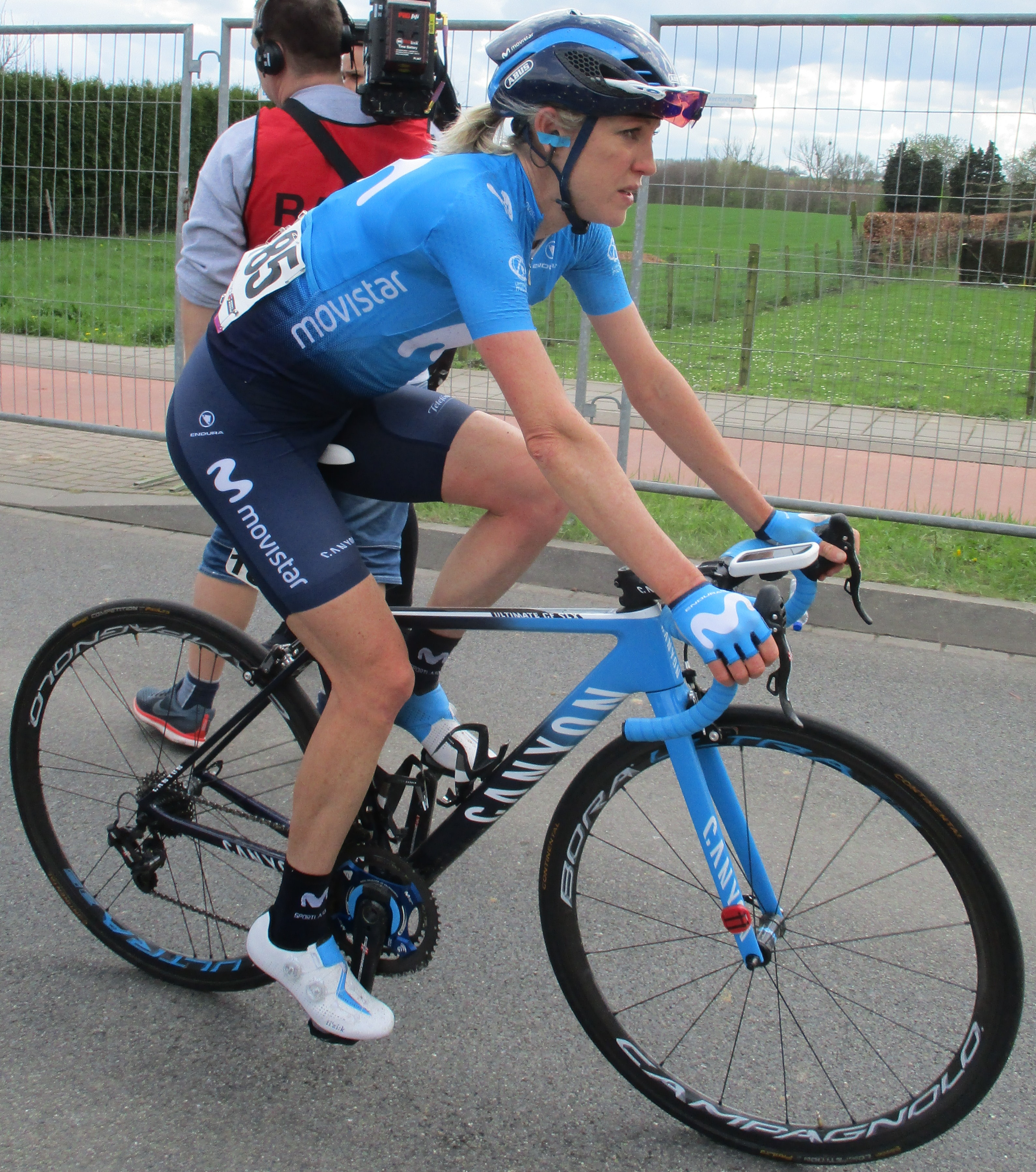
- Neylan at the finish of the 2018 Amstel Gold Race

Personal information
- Full name: Rachel Neylan
- Born: 9 March 1982 (age 44) Sydney, Australia
- Height: 169 cm (5 ft 7 in)
- Weight: 53 kg (117 lb)

Cycling career
- Sport: Cycling
- Current team: Retired
- Discipline: Road
- Role: Rider

Amateur team
- 2020: Casa Dorada Women Cycling

Professional teams
- 2011: Diadora–Pasta Zara
- 2012: Abus–Nutrixxion
- 2013: Team Hitec Products
- 2015–2017: Orica–AIS
- 2018: Movistar Team
- 2019: Team Virtu Cycling
- 2020–2021: Cronos–Casa Dorada
- 2021: Parkhotel Valkenburg
- 2022–2023: Cofidis

Major wins
- One day races Grand Prix de Plumelec-Morbihan Dames (2016) Cadel Evans Great Ocean Road Race (2015)

Rachel Neylan (born 9 March 1982) is an Australian former professional road cyclist. She won a silver medal at the 2012 World Championships in the women's road race event. She won the inaugural women's Cadel Evans Great Ocean Road Race in January 2015.

== Early life ==
Neylan was born in Sydney, Australia. She competed in athletics throughout her teenage years, before taking up rowing. She studied at the University of Sydney after which she became a physiotherapist. Between 2006 and 2007, she worked as a physiotherapist for the Australian rowing team.

== Career ==
In late 2007, Neylan was accepted onto the development program at the South Australian Sports Institute. She rode domestic Australian races throughout 2008 and rode in both the US and Europe during the 2009 season, before signing with Team System Data for the 2010 season. During the season she finished fourth at the Australian National Road Race Championships, however was forced out of the 2010 UCI Road World Championships after crashing on a training ride in Italy resulting in a broken jaw.

Neylan signed for the Diadora–Pasta Zara team for the 2011 season. She then moved to Abus–Nutrixxion for the 2012 season, during which time she finished second in the World Championships Road Race behind Marianne Vos, before signing with Team Hitec Products for the 2013 season. However, she struggled with a knee injury during the 2013 season, and after recovering was hit by a car in 2014 which injured her knee a second time.

In early 2015, Neylan finished second at the National Road Race championships and won the Cadel Evans Great Ocean Road Race, which resulted in her signing a contract for Orica–AIS. Neylan competed in the road race at the 2016 Summer Olympics, finishing in 22nd position.

Neylan rode for Team Virtu Cycling during the 2019 season, during which time she won a stage at the Gracia–Orlová and recorded two more Top 10 finishes in the WorldTour. At the end of 2019, Virtu Cycling closed the women's team and Neylan signed for new Spanish outfit Cronos–Casa Dorada. However one of the major backers of the team pulled their funding, preventing Neylan from taking part in the races required for her to qualify for the 2020 Summer Olympics. During the 2021 mid-season transfer window, Neylan moved to Parkhotel Valkenburg. In August 2021, Neylan finished sixth overall in the Ladies Tour of Norway.

== Major results ==
2009
6th Time trial, Oceania Road Cycling Championships
9th Overall Women's Tour of New Zealand
2010
9th Overall Tour Féminin en Limousin
10th Emakumeen Saria
2011
9th Overall Women's Tour of New Zealand
2012
2nd Road race, UCI Road World Championships
3rd Road race, Oceania Road Cycling Championships
3rd Road race, National Road Championships
4th Overall Tour Cycliste Féminin International de l'Ardèche
2014
5th Overall Trophée d'Or Féminin
2015
1st Overall Trophée d'Or Féminin

1st Stage 3

1st Cadel Evans Great Ocean Road Race
2nd Road race, National Road Championships
4th Road race, Oceania Road Cycling Championships
6th Overall Women's Tour Down Under
7th Overall Women's Tour of New Zealand
2016
1st Grand Prix de Plumelec-Morbihan Dames
2nd Cadel Evans Great Ocean Road Race
3rd Road race, National Road Championships
5th La Classique Morbihan
2017
2nd Erondegemse Pijl
7th Overall Tour Cycliste Féminin International de l'Ardèche
2019
3rd Overall Women's Tour Down Under
5th Overall Gracia–Orlová

1st Stage 2b

7th Cadel Evans Great Ocean Road Race
2020
10th Giro dell'Emilia Internazionale Donne Elite
2021
2nd La Choralis Fourmies Féminine
3rd Giro dell'Emilia Internazionale Donne Elite
6th Overall Ladies Tour of Norway
2022
3rd La Périgord Ladies
4th Grand Prix de Wallonie
6th Overall Tour de la Semois
7th Overall Bretagne Ladies Tour
2023
9th Overall Women's Tour Down Under
