= UniSA–Australia =

Team information
- Registered: Australia
- Founded: 2001
- Discipline: Road

Team name history
- 2001–: Team UniSA-Australia

UniSA–Australia is an Australian cycling team sponsored by the University of South Australia, entering young Australian riders in the Tour Down Under stage race held in late January in and around Adelaide.

== 2020 ==
The team members for the 2020 Tour Down Under and 2020 Women's Tour Down Under respectively are:

Men's Team

Rider	Date of birth
Cameron Scott (AUS)	4 January 1998 (aged 22)
Jarrad Drizners (AUS)	31 May 1999 (aged 20)
Samuel Jenner (AUS)	2 April 1997 (aged 22)
Tyler Lindorff (AUS)	22 March 2000 (aged 19)
Kelland O'Brien (AUS)	22 May 1998 (aged 21)
Sam Welsford (AUS)	19 January 1996 (aged 24)
Nicholas White (AUS)	6 September 1997 (aged 22)

Women's Team

Rider	Date of birth
Sophie Edwards (AUS)	25 February 2000 (aged 19)
Nicole Frain (AUS)	24 August 1992 (aged 27)
Rachel Neylan (AUS)	9 March 1982 (aged 37)
Ruby Roseman-Gannon (AUS)	8 November 1998 (aged 21)
Josie Talbot (AUS)	9 August 1996 (aged 23)
Georgia Whitehouse (AUS)	4 November 1991 (aged 28)

== 2019 ==
The team members for the 2019 Tour Down Under and 2019 Women's Tour Down Under respectively are:

Men's Team

Rider	Date of birth
Chris Harper (AUS)	23 November 1994 (aged 24)
Jason Lea (AUS)	25 June 1996 (aged 22)
Michael Potter (AUS)	6 November 1997 (aged 21)
Dylan Sunderland (AUS)	26 February 1996 (aged 22)
Ayden Toovey (AUS)	8 November 1995 (aged 23)
Neil Van der Ploeg (AUS)	23 September 1987 (aged 31)
Nicholas White (AUS)	6 September 1997 (aged 21)

Women's Team

Rider	Date of birth
Lauren Kitchen (AUS)	21 November 1990 (aged 28)
Anya Louw (AUS)	16 October 2000 (aged 18)
Rachel Neylan (AUS)	9 March 1982 (aged 36)
Emily Roper (AUS)	24 July 1994 (aged 24)
Josie Talbot (AUS)	9 August 1996 (aged 22)
Rebecca Wiasak (AUS)	24 May 1984 (aged 34)

== 2018 ==
The team members for the 2018 Tour Down Under and 2018 Women's Tour Down Under respectively are:

Men's Team

Rider	Date of birth
Scott Bowden (AUS)	4 April 1995 (aged 22)
Zak Dempster (AUS)	27 September 1987 (aged 30)
Nathan Earle (AUS)	4 June 1988 (aged 29)
Alexander Porter (AUS)	13 May 1996 (aged 21)
Timothy Roe (AUS)	28 October 1989 (aged 28)
Steele Von Hoff (AUS)	31 December 1987 (aged 30)
Sam Welsford (AUS)	19 January 1996 (aged 21)

Women's Team

Rider	Date of birth
Tiffany Cromwell (AUS)	6 July 1988 (aged 29)
Katrin Garfoot (AUS)	8 October 1981 (aged 36)
Shara Gillow (AUS)	23 December 1987 (aged 30)
Lauretta Hanson (AUS)	29 October 1994 (aged 23)
Lauren Kitchen (AUS)	21 November 1990 (aged 27)
Rachel Neylan (AUS)	9 March 1982 (aged 35)

== 2017 ==
The team members for the 2017 Tour Down Under are:

Rider	Date of birth
Nathan Earle (AUS)	4 June 1988 (aged 28)
Lucas Hamilton (AUS)	12 February 1996 (aged 20)
Jai Hindley (AUS)	5 May 1996 (aged 20)
Samuel Jenner (AUS)	2 April 1997 (aged 19)
Cameron Meyer (AUS)	11 January 1988 (aged 29)
Callum Scotson (AUS)	10 August 1996 (aged 20)
Michael Storer (AUS)	28 February 1997 (aged 19)

== 2016 ==
The team members for the 2016 Tour Down Under are:

Rider	Date of birth
Anthony Giacoppo (AUS)	13 May 1986 (aged 29)
Chris Hamilton (AUS)	18 May 1995 (aged 20)
Lucas Hamilton (AUS)	12 February 1996 (aged 19)
Patrick Lane (AUS)	28 August 1991 (aged 24)
Sean Lake (AUS)	6 December 1991 (aged 24)
Patrick Shaw (AUS)	19 February 1986 (aged 29)
Steele Von Hoff (AUS)	31 December 1987 (aged 28)

== 2015 ==
The team members for the 2015 Tour Down Under were:

Rider	Date of birth
Jack Bobridge (AUS)	13 July 1989 (aged 25)
Alexander Edmondson (AUS)	22 December 1993 (aged 21)
Jack Haig (AUS)	6 September 1993 (aged 21)
Robert Power (AUS)	11 May 1995 (aged 19)
Miles Scotson (AUS)	18 January 1994 (aged 21)
Neil Van der Ploeg (AUS)	23 September 1987 (aged 27)
Steele Von Hoff (AUS)	31 December 1987 (aged 27)
