= Down Under Classic =

Australian one-day road cycling criterium race

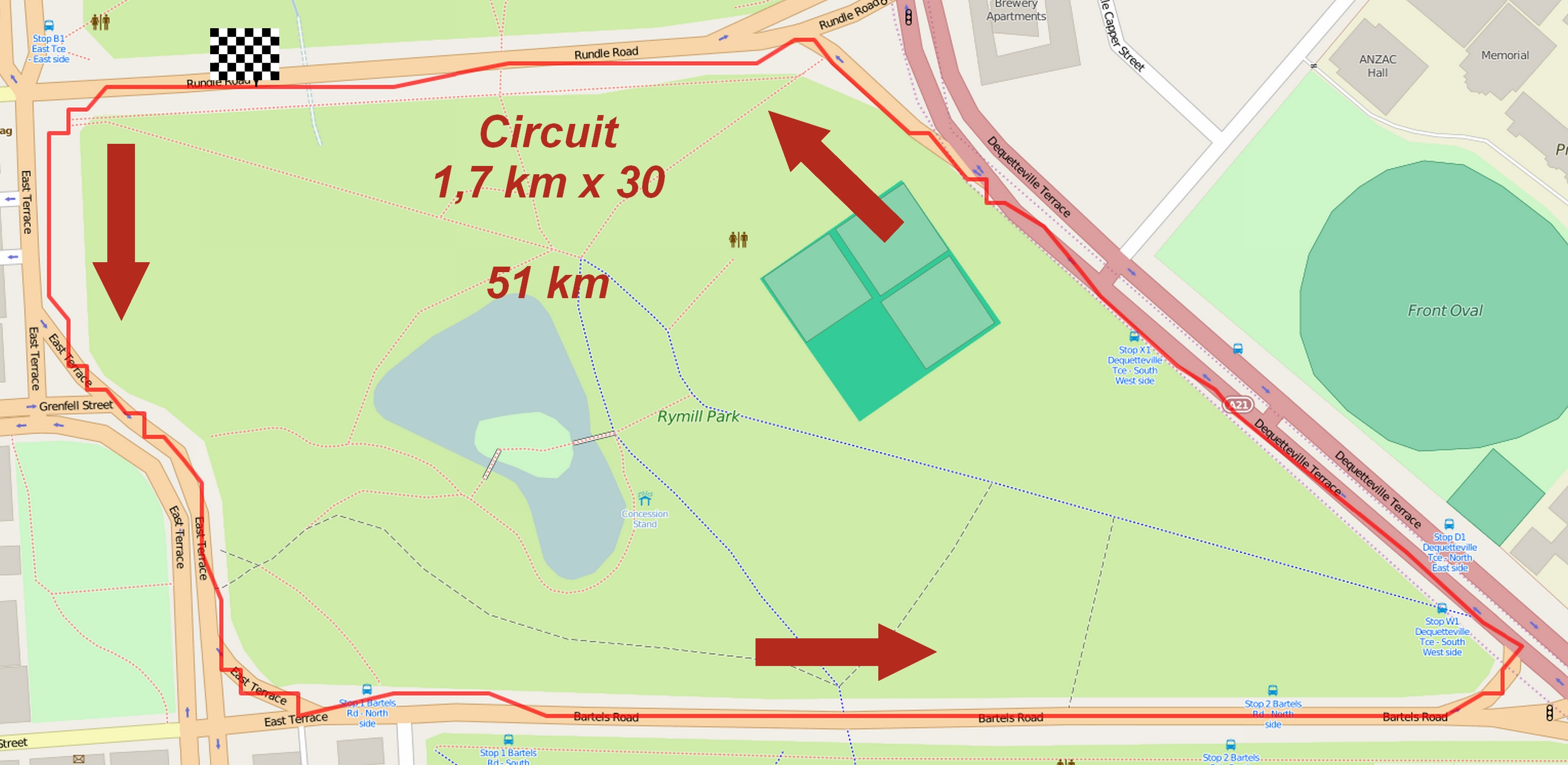
- People's Choice Classic 2015

Race details
- Date: January
- Region: Adelaide, South Australia, Australia
- Discipline: Road
- Competition: One-day
- Type: Criterium
- Organiser: Events South Australia
- Race director: Michael Turtur
- Web site: tourdownunder.com.au

History
- First edition: 2006
- Editions: 17 (as of 2024)
- First winner: Robbie McEwen (AUS)
- Most wins: Caleb Ewan (AUS) (5 wins)
- Most recent: Jhonatan Narváez (ECU)

The Down Under Classic (currently known as the Villawood Men's Classic, and previously known as the Schwalbe Classic, People's Choice Classic, and Cancer Council Helpline Classic for sponsorship reasons), is a criterium around Rymill Park in Adelaide, South Australia, Australia. It precedes the Tour Down Under.

== History ==
Since the very first Tour Down Under in 1999, there has been a history of city-based circuit racing in Adelaide. For several years the Tour Down Under featured a race around the East End of Adelaide and through the centre of Adelaide around King William Street.

The Down Under Classic was developed to retain a cycling race in the city from 2006 due to rules preventing the number of small circuit races in a multi-day stage race.

Caleb Ewan is the most successful cyclist in the race with five wins.

== Location ==
The Down Under Classic has traditionally raced around Rymill Park/Murlawirrapurka in the East End, however it has been relocated over the years.

In 2014, the race was moved to a circuit around Victoria Drive and the River Torrens, north of the University of Adelaide.

In 2017, it moved slightly south from Rymill Park to King Rodney Park/Ityamai-itpina before returning to its traditional configuration in 2019.

In 2020, it moved into the centre of Adelaide racing through main boulevards including Wakefield Street, Flinders Street and Victoria Square.

== Format ==
The Down Under Classic is typically 'raced to distance'. For instance, in 2017 the race was 50.6 kilometres, or 22 laps of the King Rodney Park circuit.

In 2019, the format was changed to be time-certain, meaning the race lasted for exactly one hour and one lap. This reverted to the full-distance format in 2020.

== Prizes ==
The Down Under Classic does not count towards time or points of the Tour Down Under and, while promoted as part of the Tour Down Under 'festival' alongside the men's and women's races, is a distinctly separate race.

Instead, riders compete for prize money, with four sprint primes and the finish line prize all offering up the opportunity to obtain financial reward.

The winner of the Down Under Classic is awarded a victor's jersey, which often presents in the colours of the event sponsor. Under Cancer Council sponsorship the jersey was blue and yellow, People's Choice was green and white (until 2018) and in 2019 the jersey was red, owing to SouthAustralia.com support.

== Results ==
Year	1st place	Team	2nd place	Team	3rd place	Team
2006	Robbie McEwen (AUS)	Davitamon–Lotto	Daniele Colli (ITA)	Liquigas	Simone Cadamuro (ITA)	Team Milram
2007	Mark Renshaw (AUS)	Crédit Agricole	Hilton Clarke (AUS)	Navigators Insurance	Simon Clarke (AUS)	SouthAustralia.com–AIS
2008	André Greipel (GER)	Team High Road	Mark Renshaw (AUS)	Crédit Agricole	Robbie McEwen (AUS)	Silence–Lotto
2009	Robbie McEwen (AUS)	Team Katusha	Wim Stroetinga (NED)	Team Milram	Graeme Brown (AUS)	Rabobank
2010	Greg Henderson (NZL)	Team Sky	Chris Sutton (AUS)	Team Sky	André Greipel (GER)	Team HTC–Columbia
2011	Matthew Goss (AUS)	HTC–Highroad	Mark Renshaw (AUS)	HTC–Highroad	Robbie McEwen (AUS)	Team RadioShack
2012	André Greipel (GER)	Lotto–Belisol	Edvald Boasson Hagen (NOR)	Team Sky	Heinrich Haussler (AUS)	Garmin–Barracuda
2013	André Greipel (GER)	Lotto–Belisol	Matthew Goss (AUS)	Orica–GreenEDGE	Greg Henderson (NZL)	Lotto–Belisol
2014	Marcel Kittel (GER)	Giant–Shimano	André Greipel (GER)	Lotto–Belisol	Caleb Ewan (AUS)	UniSA–Australia
2015	Marcel Kittel (GER)	Team Giant–Alpecin	Juan José Lobato (ESP)	Movistar Team	Wouter Wippert (NED)	Drapac Professional Cycling
2016	Caleb Ewan (AUS)	Orica–GreenEDGE	Giacomo Nizzolo (ITA)	Trek–Segafredo	Adam Blythe (GBR)	Tinkoff
2017	Caleb Ewan (AUS)	Orica–Scott	Sam Bennett (IRL)	Bora–Hansgrohe	Peter Sagan (SVK)	Bora–Hansgrohe
2018	Peter Sagan (SVK)	Bora–Hansgrohe	André Greipel (GER)	Lotto–Soudal	Caleb Ewan (AUS)	Mitchelton–Scott
2019	Caleb Ewan (AUS)	Lotto–Soudal	Peter Sagan (SVK)	Bora–Hansgrohe	Alex Edmondson (AUS)	Mitchelton–Scott
2020	Caleb Ewan (AUS)	Lotto–Soudal	Elia Viviani (ITA)	Cofidis	Simone Consonni (ITA)	Cofidis
2021	No race due to COVID-19 pandemic					
2022	No race due to COVID-19 pandemic					
2023	Caleb Ewan (AUS)	Lotto–Dstny	Jordi Meeus (BEL)	Bora–Hansgrohe	Kaden Groves (AUS)	Alpecin–Deceuninck
2024	Jhonatan Narváez (ECU)	Ineos Grenadiers	Natnael Tesfatsion (ERI)	Lidl–Trek	Isaac del Toro (MEX)	UAE Team Emirates
2025	Sam Welsford (AUS)	Red Bull–Bora–Hansgrohe	Henri Uhlig (GER)	Alpecin–Deceuninck	Matthew Brennan (GBR)	Visma–Lease a Bike
