= Tour Down Under =

Australian multi-day road cycling race

Race details
- Date: January
- Region: South Australia
- English name: Tour Down Under
- Nickname: TDU
- Discipline: Road
- Competition: UCI World Tour
- Type: Stage race
- Organiser: Events South Australia
- Race director: Stuart O'Grady
- Web site: tourdownunder.com.au

History
- First edition: 19 January 1999
- Editions: 26 (as of 2026)
- First winner: Stuart O'Grady (AUS)
- Most wins: Simon Gerrans (AUS) (4 wins)
- Most recent: Jay Vine (AUS)

The Tour Down Under (currently branded as the Santos Tour Down Under for sponsorship reasons) is a cycling race in and around Adelaide, South Australia. It is traditionally the opening event of the UCI World Tour and UCI Women’s WorldTour.

The event was established in 1999 with the support of then Premier of South Australia John Olsen as part of an effort to strengthen the state’s sporting calendar after the Australian Grand Prix moved from Adelaide to Melbourne, Victoria. Since that time it has been owned and managed by the South Australian Government through Events South Australia, the events division of the South Australian Tourism Commission. It experienced rapid growth in its first two decades, becoming the first race granted UCI ProTour status (now UCI WorldTour) in 2008 and the first event of the UCI World Ranking calendar in 2009.

The Tour Down Under takes place each January and features stages suited to sprinters, climbers and all-rounders. Like other UCI WorldTour races, the men’s race attracts all the top UCI teams, as well as a national representative team made up of riders without full-time professional contracts.

Women's races have been held alongside the event since 2011, with the Women's Tour Down Under founded in 2016. This race joined the UCI Women's World Tour in 2023 – the highest level of international road cycling competition.

Men’s and women’s teams traditionally consist of six riders. The rider with the lowest cumulative time after each stage is honoured with the ochre jersey. Similarly, leaders in the sprint, mountains and youth classifications wear jerseys to signify their positions in those standings.

== History ==
In 1993, it was announced that the Formula One Australian Grand Prix would move from Adelaide, South Australia, to Melbourne, Victoria, from the 1996 season. Following the loss of this major sporting event, the Government of South Australia worked to organise other major sporting events to replace the Grand Prix, including the Adelaide 500 and the Tour Down Under.

In 1999, the Tour Down Under was established as the Jacobs Creek Tour Down Under. The original event concept was developed by a team led by 1984 Olympics 4000m team pursuit gold medallist Michael Turtur in conjunction with the Government of South Australia.

The first Tour Down Under was a UCI 2.4-class race and featured teams from Australia and around the world, among them GC-Casino, BigMat-Auber93, Crédit Agricole, Lampre–Daikin, Palmans–Ideal, Deutsche Bank Telekom, Team home-Jack&Jones, Saeco, the Australian Institute of Sport, Mapei, plus teams assembled under the banner of 'Team Australia' and 'World Team'. The race was won by Stuart O'Grady who in 2020 succeeded Turtur as Race Director. Current-day professional team Decathlon–AG2R La Mondiale has competed in every Tour Down Under.

In 2005, the Tour Down Under secured the highest UCI ranking outside Europe. In 2007, South Australian Premier Mike Rann and former tourism minister Jane Lomax Smith launched a campaign for the Tour Down Under to become the first race outside of Europe to secure ProTour status from the UCI, thereby guaranteeing the attendance of all the world's top teams.

That campaign successfully led to the Tour Down Under being awarded ProTour status the following year, and joining the UCI World Ranking calendar in 2009.

In September 2008, Rann announced that Lance Armstrong would make his professional cycling comeback at the 2009 race. Armstrong's participation saw visitor numbers double, with the event’s economic impact more than doubling (from $17.3 million in 2008 to $39 million in 2009) and media coverage increased five-fold. In 2009 Santos bought the naming rights and in 2010 the Tour Down Under was named Australia's Best Major Event for the second year in a row in the Qantas Tourism Awards. Armstrong participated in three successive Tour Down Under events, retiring after 2011.

The 2011 Tour Down Under had an economic impact of $43 million and crowds of more than 782,000. In 2013, it attracted more than 760,400 people to Adelaide and regional South Australia across eight days, including 40,000 interstate and international visitors who travelled there for the event.

Since then the race has continued to build, with milestones including becoming the first non-European event to achieve UCI ProTour status, being named as Australia's Best Sporting Event in 2016 and receiving a bronze medal at the Australian Tourism Awards. Its 2020 edition attracted 779,362 spectators, created 742 full-time equivalent jobs and generated an economic benefit of $66.4 million.

=== COVID-19 pandemic ===
In November 2020, organisers confirmed the 2021 edition of the race would be cancelled due to logistical and quarantine complications arising from the COVID-19 pandemic. An all-Australian event known as the Santos Festival of Cycling was held 19–24 January 2021, featuring six days of competitions across road, track, paracycling, BMX, mountain bike and cyclocross, and a four-stage race on the National Road Series. The men's National Road Series event was won by Luke Durbridge, while the women's event was won by Sarah Gigante.

In September 2021 organisers confirmed that the Tour Down Under would be cancelled for the second consecutive year due to continued travel and quarantine restrictions affecting the ability for international teams to participate. The second annual Santos Festival of Cycling was held 21–29 January 2022.

=== Return of the race ===
In 2023 the Tour Down Under resumed as an international event. Grace Brown (FDJ-SUEZ) and Jay Vine (UAE Team Emirates) won the women's and men's races respectively. In 2026, one stage of the race was shortened by around 50 kilometres (31 mi) due to predicted temperatures of 43 °C (109 °F) and an "Extreme" fire warning.

=== List of overall winners ===
Year	Country	Rider	Team
1999	Australia	Stuart O'Grady	Crédit Agricole
2000	France	Gilles Maignan	AG2R Prévoyance
2001	Australia	Stuart O'Grady	Crédit Agricole
2002	Australia	Michael Rogers	Australian Institute of Sport
2003	Spain	Mikel Astarloza	AG2R Prévoyance
2004	Australia	Patrick Jonker	UniSA–Australia
2005	Spain	Luis León Sánchez	Liberty Seguros–Würth
2006	Australia	Simon Gerrans	AG2R Prévoyance
2007	Switzerland	Martin Elmiger	AG2R Prévoyance
2008	Germany	André Greipel	Team High Road
2009	Australia	Allan Davis	Quick-Step
2010	Germany	André Greipel	Team HTC–Columbia
2011	Australia	Cameron Meyer	Garmin–Cervélo
2012	Australia	Simon Gerrans	GreenEDGE
2013	Netherlands	Tom-Jelte Slagter	Blanco Pro Cycling
2014	Australia	Simon Gerrans	Orica–GreenEDGE
2015	Australia	Rohan Dennis	BMC Racing Team
2016	Australia	Simon Gerrans	Orica–GreenEDGE
2017	Australia	Richie Porte	BMC Racing Team
2018	South Africa	Daryl Impey	Mitchelton–Scott
2019	South Africa	Daryl Impey	Mitchelton–Scott
2020	Australia	Richie Porte	Trek–Segafredo
2021	No race due to COVID-19 pandemic		
2022	No race due to COVID-19 pandemic		
2023	Australia	Jay Vine	UAE Team Emirates
2024	Great Britain	Stephen Williams	Israel–Premier Tech
2025	Ecuador	Jhonatan Narváez	UAE Team Emirates XRG
2026	Australia	Jay Vine	UAE Team Emirates XRG

Simon Gerrans has won the Tour four times (2006, 2012, 2014, and 2016). Stuart O'Grady (1999 and 2001), André Greipel (2008 and 2010), Daryl Impey (2018 and 2019), Richie Porte (2017 and 2020) and Jay Vine (2023 and 2026) have won the Tour Down Under twice; Impey is the only rider to successfully defend his title.

The Santos Tour Down Under was not held in 2021 and 2022 due to the COVID-19 pandemic, but in its place was the locally focused Santos Festival Of Cycling.

=== Wins per country ===
Wins	Country
15	Australia
2	Germany; South Africa; Spain
1	Ecuador; France; Great Britain; Netherlands; Switzerland

=== Tour directors ===
- 1999–2020: Michael Turtur AO.
- 2021 – : Stuart O'Grady

== Women's racing and the Women's Tour Down Under ==
From 2011, women's races were held alongside the Tour Down Under, initially as a series of criterium races. In 2016, the Women's Tour Down Under was founded, and was won by Mitchelton–Scott rider Katrin Garfoot. The race maintained its initial UCI 2.2 status until 2018, when it secured UCI 2.1 status and became the first cycling event in the world to offer women the same prize money as men.

From 2023, the women’s race was elevated to the UCI Women's World Tour, becoming the only stage race at this level in Australia. The event features stages through Adelaide and regions including the Barossa, Adelaide Hills and Fleurieu Peninsula.

== Course ==
The Santos Tour Down Under generally features stages through and surrounding Adelaide on terrain that ranges from flat to undulating and steep. In 2024, the race featured its most challenging final weekend to date, with ascents of both Willunga Hill and Mount Lofty designed to test the peloton.

South Australia in late January is often hot. Daily maximum temperatures approaching or exceeding 40 °C (104 °F) are not uncommon and often challenge riders, including many who travel direct to South Australia from winter in the northern hemisphere.

=== Frequent locations ===
South Australian councils host Tour Down Under stage starts and finishes. Main streets and communities such as The Parade in Norwood, King William Road in Unley, and Jetty Road in Glenelg - along with Stirling, Tanunda and McLaren Vale – are frequent locations for hosting race departures and arrivals. Certain vistas have become synonymous with the Santos Tour Down Under, particularly the Barossa’s rolling vineyards, the coastline around Aldinga on the Fleurieu Peninsula and the native bushland found on the slopes of Willunga Hill.

New start and finish locations in recent years have included Uraidla, Brighton, Port Willunga, Port Elliot and Mount Lofty.

The race usually spends time in metropolitan Adelaide and nearby regions including the Barossa, Adelaide Hills and Fleurieu Peninsula. In 2024 it visited the Murray River, Lakes and Coorong, with Murray Bridge to host its first men’s stage start.

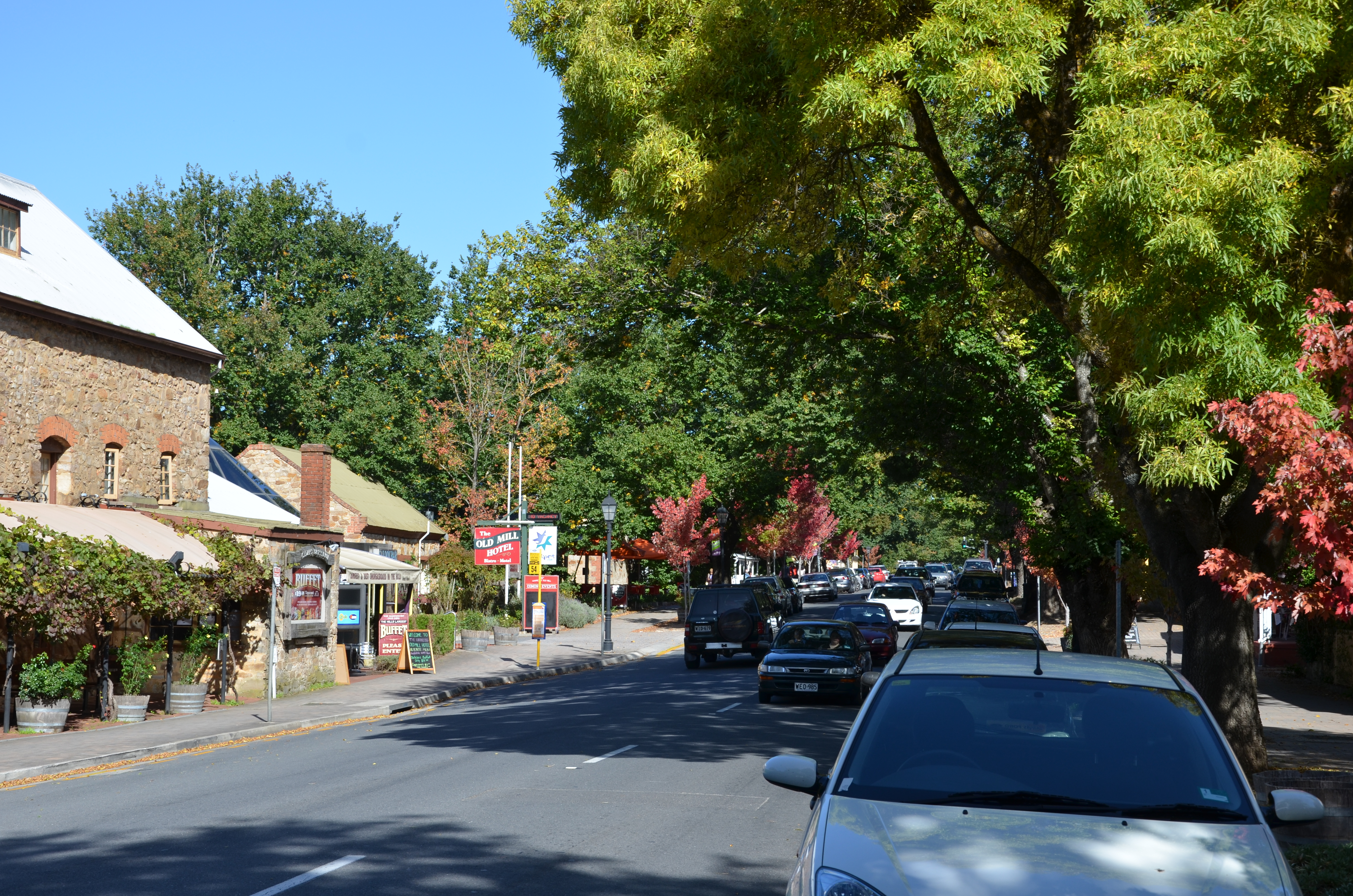
Hahndorf is a German settlement in the Adelaide Hills.

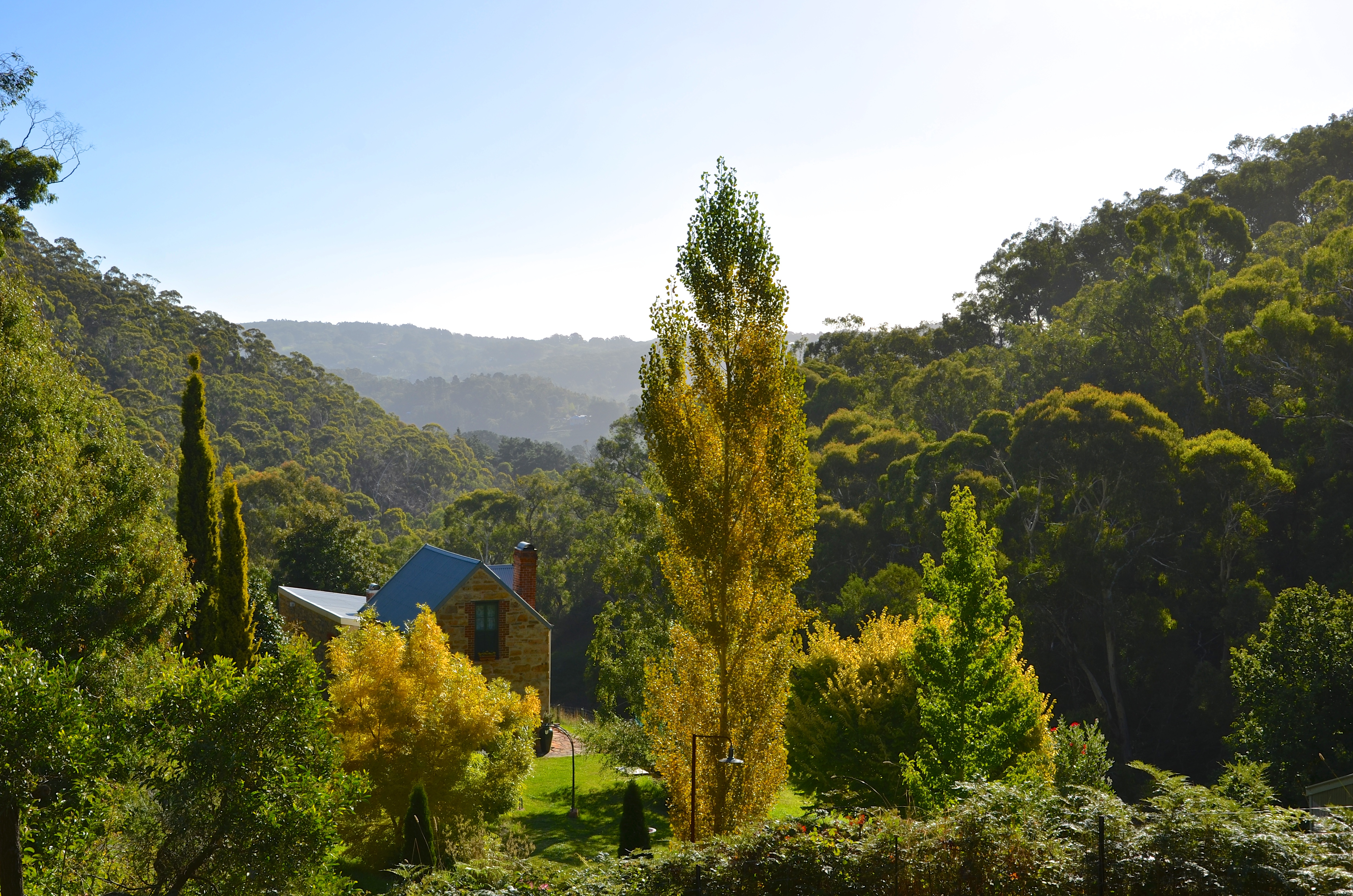
Forest Range is a popular cycling location.

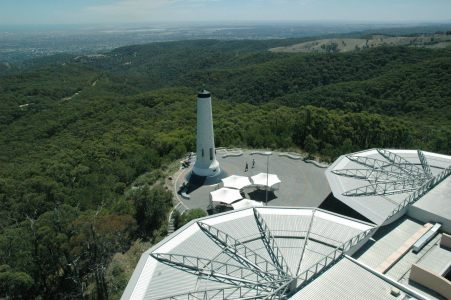
Mount Lofty looking over the Adelaide Plains.

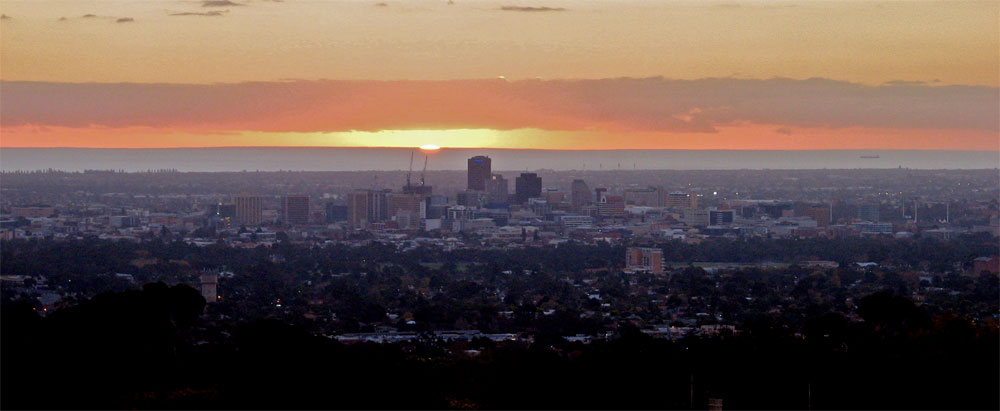
View of Adelaide from the surrounding Adelaide Hills.

== Jerseys ==
Leaders of competitions within the race wear a distinctive jersey as per cycling tradition. Both the men’s and women’s races acknowledge classification leaders with jerseys.

=== Race classification jerseys ===
- General classification: The ochre jersey is awarded to the rider with the lowest cumulative time at the end of each stage, and to the overall race winner following the final stage. Ochre is associated with the Australian landscape and the Santos Tour Down Under is the only race that uses it on a jersey. The jersey is currently sponsored by Santos.
- Sprint classification: The sprint jersey is awarded to the rider with the most points. Time bonuses are awarded to the first three riders across the line at points along each stage route and the finish. This jersey’s colour and design usually changes based on its sponsor. The current sprint jersey is blue and sponsored by Ziptrak, an Australian outdoor blind manufacturer.
- Mountain classification: The king/queen of the mountain jersey is awarded to the rider with the most points from those earned by the first five riders over specified climb checkpoints on significant hills. The jersey retains the traditional polka dot design used in cycling races to denote the leader of this classification. The colour of dots on this jersey changes with its sponsor, which at present is Adelaide-based information technology company efex.
- Young rider classification: The young rider’s jersey is traditionally white in colour and is awarded to the leading rider under 23 at the end of each stage. Zwift is the current sponsor of this jersey.

=== Other prizes ===
- The most aggressive rider is awarded red number patches after each stage. There is no overall classification.
- The winning team competition is awarded to the team with the lowest cumulative team by its four best riders on each of the six stages. Wilson Parking sponsors this component of the event.

== Cycling Festival ==
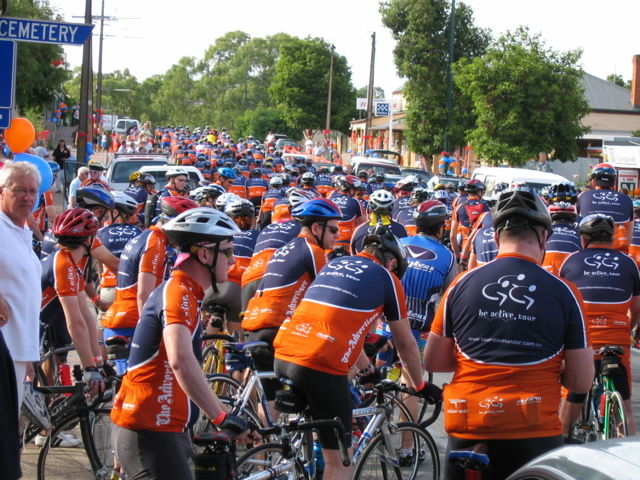
Participants in the 2005 Be Active Tour at Angaston

The Santos Festival of Cycling is held together with the Santos Tour Down Under. It features South Australian food and beverage experiences, amateur participation activities for children and adults, street parties and various other community events organised by host councils. The festival program encourages visitors attending the Santos Tour Down Under to explore Adelaide and surrounding regions.

=== Tour Village ===
The Tour Village is a hub for fans and teams. It is based in Victoria Square/Tarntanyangga – part of the Adelaide central business district – and opposite the Hilton Adelaide, a team accommodation provider.

A Team Zone extends across the southern side of the square and features booths for each men’s and women’s team competing at the Santos Tour Down Under. Fans are invited to walk through the space and watch mechanics at work on athletes’ bikes.

The Bike Expo is based on the northern side of the square and houses bike retail displays, food vendors, bars and a large stage used for the team presentation and opening night concert, which are free to attend.

=== Challenge Tour and participation activities ===
Since 2003 the Tour Down Under has included a companion event – the Challenge Tour – held on the morning of a race stage ahead of professionals competing. The inaugural Challenge Tour event in 2003 was known as the Break-Away Tour and attracted more than 600 riders. In 2004 this grew to 1,400 participants, with the event known as the Be Active Tour. Its name went on to change in line with various partnership agreements; when held in 2023 the event was simply named the Challenge Tour.

It has only been cancelled once – in 2018 – when temperatures over 40 degrees forced organisers to abandon the ride. The Challenge Tour took place on a Friday from its inception until 2019, when it was held on a Saturday and known as the Challenge Tour presented by The Advertiser. Organizers decided to rest the Challenge Tour in 2024, instead offering a program which would feature more variety to suit a broader range of cycling interests and abilities.

In 2025 the community participation ride was The Adelaide Epic, covering Stage 3 from Norwood to Uraidla.

Year	Event name	Stage travelled	Participants
2003	Break-Away Tour	Stage 2: Jacob's Creek – Kapunda	620
2004	Be Active Tour	Stage 3: Goolwa – Victor Harbor	1400
2005	Be Active Tour	Stage 2: Salisbury – Tanunda	2000
2006	Be Active Tour	Stage 3: Strathalbyn – Yankalilla	2525
2007	Be Active Tour	Stage 4: Stirling – Victor Harbor	
2008	Mutual Community Challenge Tour	Stage 4: Mannum – Strathalbyn	3403
2009	Mutual Community Challenge Tour	Stage 4: Burnside Village – Angaston	
2010	Mutual Community Challenge Tour	Stage 4: Norwood – Goolwa	8099
2011	Mutual Community Challenge Tour	Stage 4: Norwood – Strathalbyn	
2012	Bupa Challenge Tour	Stage 4: Norwood – Tanunda	
2013	Bupa Challenge Tour	Stage 4: Modbury – Nuriootpa	
2014	Bupa Challenge Tour	Stage 4: Unley – Victor Harbor	
2015	Bupa Challenge Tour	Stage 4: Glenelg – Mount Barker	
2016	Bupa Challenge Tour	Stage 4: Norwood – Victor Harbor	
2017	Bupa Challenge Tour	Stage 4: Norwood – Campbelltown	
2018	Bupa Challenge Tour	Stage 4: Norwood – Uraidla (cancelled)	
2019	Challenge Tour	Stage 5: Glenelg – Strathalbyn	
2020	Westpac Challenge Tour	Stage 4: Norwood – Murray Bridge	
2023	Challenge Tour	Stage 3: Norwood – Campbelltown	

== Down Under Classic ==
Since 2008 a circuit race has traditionally been held before the official start of the Santos Tour Down Under. This event, known as the Down Under Classic, takes place on roads throughout central Adelaide. It does not count towards overall standings in the Santos Tour Down Under, though riders do compete for prize money. In 2020 and 2023 the race was held as the Schwalbe Classic.

=== Down Under Classic Winners ===
Year	Country	Rider	Team
2006	Australia	Robbie McEwen	Davitamon–Lotto
2007	Australia	Mark Renshaw	Crédit Agricole
2008	Germany	André Greipel	Team High Road
2009	Australia	Robbie McEwen	Team Katusha
2010	New Zealand	Greg Henderson	Team Sky
2011	Australia	Matt Goss	HTC–Highroad
2012	Germany	André Greipel	Lotto–Belisol
2013	Germany	André Greipel	Lotto–Belisol
2014	Germany	Marcel Kittel	Giant–Shimano
2015	Germany	Marcel Kittel	Team Giant–Alpecin
2016	Australia	Caleb Ewan	Orica–GreenEDGE
2017	Australia	Caleb Ewan	Orica–Scott
2018	Slovakia	Peter Sagan	Bora–Hansgrohe
2019	Australia	Caleb Ewan	Lotto–Soudal
2020	Australia	Caleb Ewan	Lotto–Soudal
2021	No race due to COVID-19 pandemic		
2022	No race due to COVID-19 pandemic		
2023	Australia	Caleb Ewan	Lotto–Dstny
2024	Ecuador	Jhonatan Narváez	Ineos Grenadiers
2025	Australia	Sam Welsford	Red Bull–Bora–Hansgrohe

== Traditions ==
=== Ochre jersey ===
From 1999 until 2005 the Tour Down Under presented the general classification leader and eventual winner with a yellow jersey, as seen at the Tour de France. In 2006 this yellow jersey was replaced by an ochre-coloured jersey, a colour chosen for its links to the Australian outback landscape.

=== Oppy the Kangaroo ===
The race convoy is led by a car bearing the event’s mascot Oppy, who was named for Australian cyclist Hubert Opperman.

== See also ==
- Bicycling terminology
- Adelaide, South Australia
- List of Australian Festivals
- UCI WorldTour
- List of Cities and Towns in South Australia
- Road cycling
