= Lauretta Hanson =

Australian cyclist (born 1994)

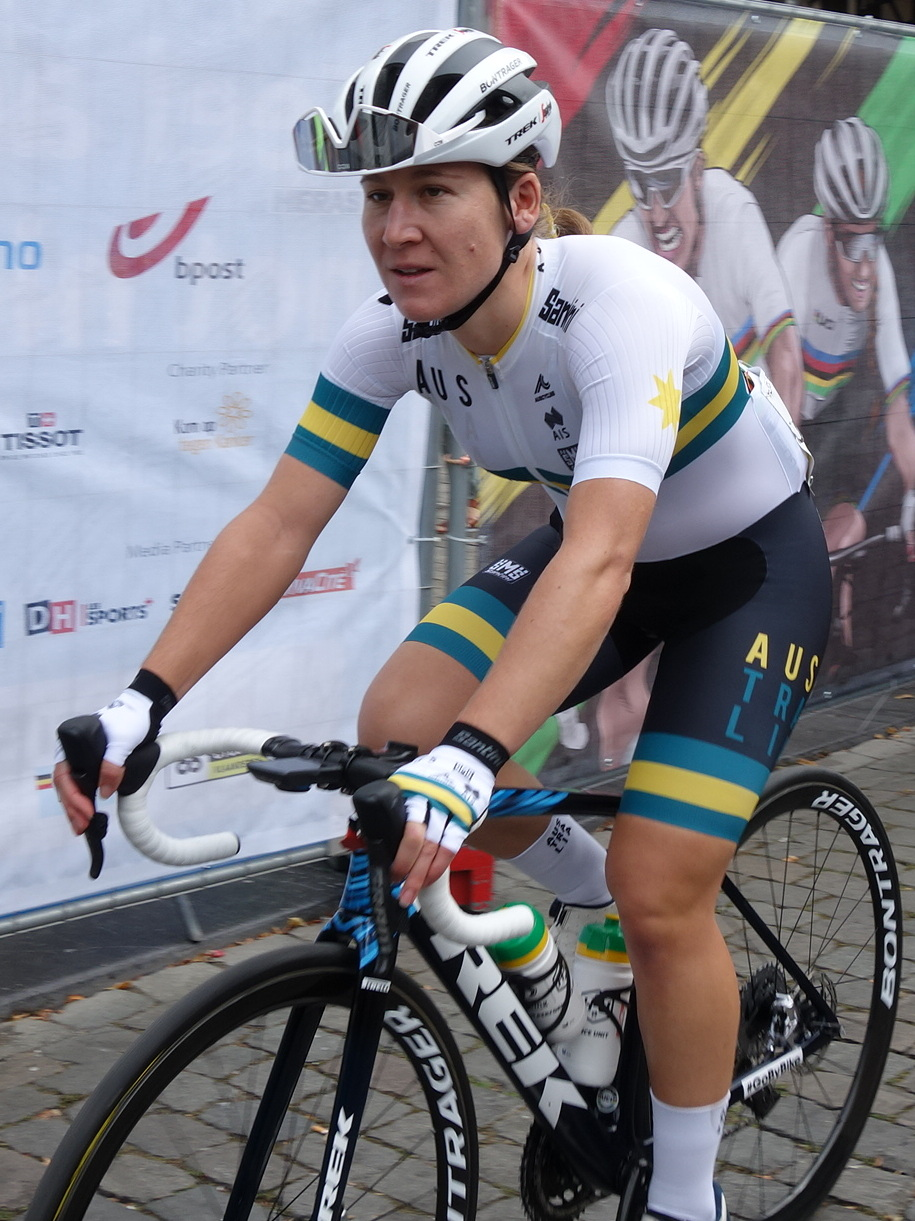
- Hanson in 2021

Personal information
- Full name: Lauretta Hanson
- Born: 29 October 1994 (age 31)

Cycling career
- Sport: Cycling
- Current team: Lidl–Trek
- Discipline: Road
- Role: Rider
- Rider type: Domestique

Amateur team
- 2014–2015: Fearless Femme

Professional teams
- 2016: Colavita/Bianchi
- 2017–2018: UnitedHealthcare
- 2019–: Trek–Segafredo

Lauretta Hanson (born 29 October 1994) is an Australian professional racing cyclist, who currently rides for UCI Women's WorldTeam Lidl–Trek.

== Career ==
Prior to joining Trek–Segafredo, Hanson competed for Colavita/Bianchi in 2016 and UnitedHealthcare in 2017 and 2018. In January 2018, Hanson was selected in the Korda-Mentha Australian cycling team to race the Women's Tour Down Under, the Women's Herald Sun Tour and the Cadel Evans Great Ocean Road Race.

She was recruited in 2019 by the new Trek-Segafredo team. She made her debut in her new colours at the Tour Down Under.

== Personal life ==
In August 2020, Hanson was studying a Bachelor of Business (Sports Management) at Deakin University, which she had completed by July 2024.

== Major results ==
2015
1st Mildred Kugler Women's Open
2nd Overall Tour of America's Dairyland

1st Stages 5 & 9

5th Overall Armed Forces Association Cycling Classic
5th White Spot / Delta Road Race
2016
10th Overall Women's Tour Down Under

1st Young rider classification

10th Overall Ladies Tour of Qatar
2017
3rd Winston-Salem Cycling Classic
2018
7th Overall Tour de Feminin-O cenu Českého Švýcarska

1st Stage 3 (ITT)

7th Chrono Gatineau
8th Road race, National Road Championships
8th Grand Prix Cycliste de Gatineau
2019
4th Le Samyn des Dames
2021
3rd Road race, National Road Championships

== See also ==
- List of 2016 UCI Women's Teams and riders
