= Emily Herfoss =

Australian road cyclist

Personal information
- Full name: Emily Herfoss
- Born: Emily Roper; 24 July 1994 (age 32) Australia

Cycling career
- Sport: Cycling
- Current team: Roxsolt Liv SRAM
- Disciplines: Road; Cyclo-cross
- Role: Rider

Amateur team
- 2017: High5 Dream Team

Professional team
- 2020–: Roxsolt Attaquer

Emily Herfoss (née Roper; born 24 July 1994) is an Australian professional racing cyclist, who currently rides for UCI Women's Continental Team Roxsolt Liv SRAM.

== Personal life ==
In 2019, she married motorcycle racer and cyclist Troy Herfoss, a two-time Australian Superbike Championship winner and sometime Superbike World Championship competitor.

== Major results ==
2012
UCI Junior Road World Championships

4th Time trial
9th Road race

2013
7th Open de Suède Vårgårda
9th Time trial, Oceania Cycling Championships
2014
6th Time trial, Oceania Cycling Championships
6th Road race, Australian National Road Race Championships
2016
9th Time trial, Australian National Time Trial Championships
2019
4th Winston-Salem Cycling Classic
6th Overall Women's Herald Sun Tour
7th Road race, Australian National Road Race Championships
8th Cadel Evans Great Ocean Road Race
9th Overall Women's Tour Down Under
2020
2nd Race Torquay
National Road Championships

3rd Time trial
4th Road race
