= Burgos Alimenta Women Cycling Sport =

Spanish cycling team

Team information
- UCI code: CDO (2020); WCS (2021–)
- Registered: Spain
- Founded: 2019
- Status: National (Jan–Jun 2020); UCI Women's Continental Team (Jul 2020–)

Team name history
- 2020; 2020; 2021–: Casa Dorada Women Cycling; Cronos–Casa Dorada; Burgos Alimenta Women Cycling Sport

Burgos Alimenta Women Cycling Sport is a Spanish women's cycling team, that was established for the 2020 season. After initially being denied a UCI Women's Continental Team licence at the start of the season, the team acquired one midway through the year.

== Team roster ==
As of 1 August 2021.

Rider	Date of birth
Antri Christoforou (CYP)	2 April 1992 (age 34)
Sara Cueto (ESP)	16 February 1994 (age 32)
Ainara Elbusto (ESP)	10 September 1992 (age 33)
Nicole Hanselmann (SUI)	6 May 1991 (age 35)
Małgorzata Jasińska (POL)	18 January 1984 (age 42)
Nofar Maoz (ISR)	27 October 2001 (age 24)

Rider	Date of birth
Tereza Neumanová (CZE)	9 August 1998 (age 28)
Luciana Roland (ARG)	8 January 1995 (age 31)
Ana Ruíz (ESP)	9 August 1990 (age 36)
Josie Talbot (AUS)	9 August 1996 (age 30)
Alessia Vigilia (ITA)	1 September 1999 (age 27)

== National Champions ==
2021
Czech Republic Road Race, Tereza Neumanová
Cyprus Time Trial, Antri Christoforou
Cyprus Road Race, Antri Christoforou
