= Women's Tour Down Under =

Cycling race in Australia

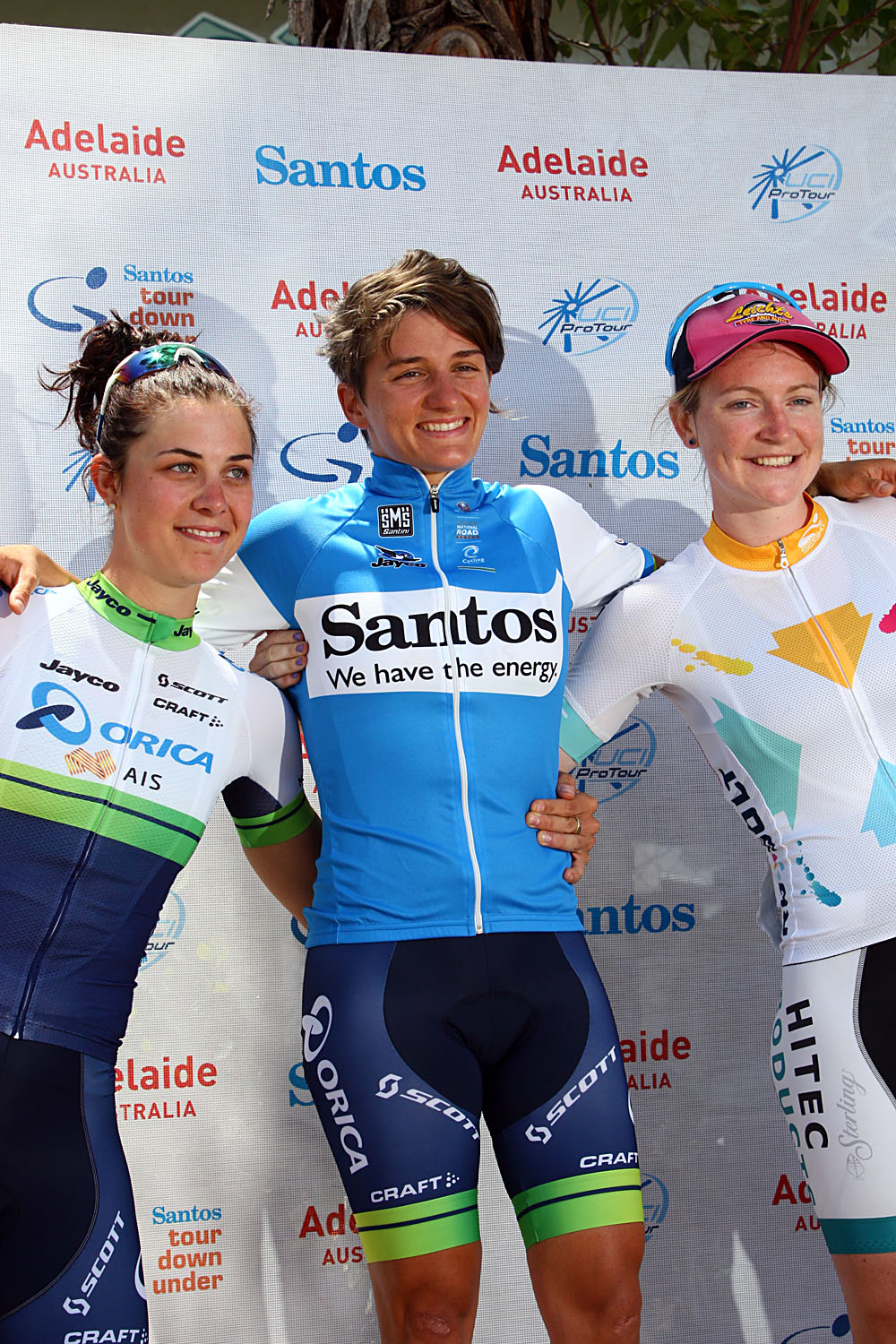

Race details
- Date: January
- Region: Australia
- Local name: Santos Women's Tour Down Under
- Discipline: Road
- Competition: UCI 2.2 (2016–2017); UCI 2.1 (2018–2019); UCI Pro Series (2020); UCI Women's World Tour (2022-)
- Type: Stage race
- Organiser: Events South Australia
- Race director: Stuart O'Grady
- Web site: tourdownunder.com.au/race/womens

History
- First edition: 2016
- Editions: 9 (as of 2026)
- First winner: Katrin Garfoot (AUS)
- Most wins: Amanda Spratt (AUS) (3 wins)
- Most recent: Noemi Rüegg (SUI)

The Women's Tour Down Under (known for sponsorship reasons as the Santos Women's Tour Down Under) is an annual professional road bicycle racing for women in and around Adelaide, Australia.

Women's races have been held in conjunction with the men's Tour Down Under since the late 2000s, with the Women's Tour Down Under first held in 2016. Since 2023, the race has been part of the UCI Women's World Tour – the highest level of international road cycling competition. It is held in conjunction with the men's Tour Down Under, and traditionally the opening event of the UCI Women’s WorldTour.

== History ==
Women's racing at the Tour Down Under began in the late 2000s as a series of exhibition criterium races in conjunction with the Tour Down Under event (for example, at the 2007 Tour Down Under). This eventually formed part of the women's National Road Series (2015), with these races variously operating under guises deriving from the parent event's name.

In 2016, organisers developed a new UCI-classified event that carried the 'Women's Tour' name, and was ranked as a new UCI 2.2. stage race with international teams invited to compete. The event considers the 'Women's Tour Down Under' as having started in 2016.

Originally called the 'Santos Women's Tour' the first race was won by former Australian Champion Katrin Garfoot. From 2018, the race leaders and overall winner are awarded an Ochre Jersey as has been the tradition in the men's event since 2006. In 2018, organisers announced that equal prize money would be awarded to the winners of the Tour Down Under and Women's Tour Down Under. In 2018, the race increased in status to UCI 2.1.

The three subsequent races were won by Amanda Spratt, and in 2020 Ruth Winder became the first non-Australian and non Mitchelton–Scott (women's team) rider to win the event. the race also joined the UCI Women's ProSeries.

The race was not held in 2021 or 2022 due to the COVID-19 pandemic. However, an alternative National Road Series stage race was held under the name Festival of Cycling. The 2021 edition was won by Sarah Gigante and the 2022 edition was won by Ruby Roseman-Gannon.

In 2023 the race was elevated to Women's WorldTour level. The 2023 edition was won by Australian cyclist Grace Brown.

In 2023, Stuart O'Grady replaced Kimberley Conte as race director with the addition of two new assistant race directors Annette Edmondson and Carlee Taylor.

== Course ==
The race generally features stages through and surrounding Adelaide on terrain that ranges from flat to undulating and steep, with climbs like Willunga Hill.

South Australia in late January is often hot. Daily maximum temperatures approaching or exceeding 40 °C (104 °F) are not uncommon and often challenge riders, including many who travel direct to South Australia from winter in the northern hemisphere.

== Women's Tour Down Under Winners ==
| Year | Country | Rider | Team |
|---|---|---|---|
| 2016 | Australia | Katrin Garfoot | Orica–AIS |
| 2017 | Australia | Amanda Spratt | Orica–Scott |
| 2018 | Australia | Amanda Spratt | Mitchelton–Scott |
| 2019 | Australia | Amanda Spratt (3) | Mitchelton–Scott |
| 2020 | United States | Ruth Winder | Trek–Segafredo |
| 2021 | No race due to COVID-19 pandemic | | |
| 2022 | No race due to COVID-19 pandemic | | |
| 2023 | Australia | Grace Brown | FDJ–Suez |
| 2024 | Australia | Sarah Gigante | AG Insurance–Soudal |
| 2025 | Switzerland | Noemi Rüegg | EF Education–Oatly |
| 2026 | Switzerland | Noemi Rüegg (2) | EF Education–Oatly |

== Classification leaders' jerseys ==
| Classification | 2016 | 2017 | 2018 | 2019 | 2020 | 2023 | 2024 | 2025 | 2026 |
|---|---|---|---|---|---|---|---|---|---|
| General | | | | | | | | | |
| Points | | | | | | | | | |
| Mountains | | | | | | | | | |
| Youth | | | | | | | | | |

== Predecessor women's racing events ==
From the mid-2000s, women's racing commenced at the Tour Down Under, usually as small-scale criterium races at start and finish locations aligned to the men's race, such as part of the 2007 Tour Down Under.

The inaugural professional event in 2011 was known as the Rendition Homes-Santos Women's Cup was won by Chloe Hosking.

In 2012 the criterium series took place in Adelaide City, Prospect and Hyde Park and was won by Judith Arndt.

In 2013, the Santos Women's Cup was held in Adelaide City, Prospect and Hyde Park and was won by Kimberley Wells.

In 2014, the Santos Women's Cup was held in Adelaide City, Angaston and Prospect and was won by Loes Gunnewijk.

In 2015, the 'Santos Women's Tour' was a four-part race as part of Cycling Australia's National Road Series with stages running from Woodside-Murray Bridge, Adelaide city, Tanunda-Campbelltown, Victoria Park.

=== Previous Women's Tour & Women's Cup winners ===
| Year | Country | Rider | Team |
|---|---|---|---|
| 2011 | Australia | Chloe Hosking | HTC-Highroad |
| 2012 | Germany | Judith Arndt | Orica–AIS |
| 2013 | Australia | Kimberley Wells | Specialized–Securitor |
| 2014 | Netherlands | Loes Gunnewijk | Orica–AIS |
| 2015 | Italy | Valentina Scandolara | Orica–AIS |

=== Classification leaders jerseys ===
| Classification | 2012 | 2013 | 2014 | 2015 |
|---|---|---|---|---|
| General | | | | |
| Points | | | | |
| Mountains | | | | |
| Youth | | | | |
