= 2017 Team Sunweb (men's team) season =

Team Sunweb
- 2017 season
- UCI code: SUN
- Status: UCI WorldTeam
- Manager: Iwan Spekenbrink
- Main sponsor(s): Sunweb
- Based: Germany
- Bicycles: Giant
- Groupset: Shimano

Season victories
- One-day races: 1
- Stage race overall: 2
- Stage race stages: 11
- Grand Tours: 1
- National Championships: 3

The 2017 season for Team Sunweb began in January with the Tour Down Under. As a UCI WorldTeam, they were automatically invited and obligated to send a squad to every event in the UCI World Tour.

== Team roster ==
As of 1 January 2017.

Rider	Date of birth
Søren Kragh Andersen (DEN)	10 August 1994 (aged 22)
Nikias Arndt (GER)	18 November 1991 (aged 25)
Warren Barguil (FRA)	28 October 1991 (aged 25)
Phil Bauhaus (GER)	8 July 1994 (aged 22)
Roy Curvers (NED)	27 December 1979 (aged 37)
Bert De Backer (BEL)	2 April 1984 (aged 32)
Tom Dumoulin (NED)	11 November 1990 (aged 26)
Johannes Fröhlinger (GER)	9 June 1985 (aged 31)
Simon Geschke (GER)	13 March 1986 (aged 30)
Chad Haga (USA)	26 August 1988 (aged 28)
Chris Hamilton (AUS)	18 May 1995 (aged 21)
Lennard Hofstede (NED)	29 December 1994 (aged 22)
Wilco Kelderman (NED)	25 March 1991 (aged 25)

Rider	Date of birth
Lennard Kämna (GER)	9 September 1996 (aged 20)
Sindre Lunke (NOR)	17 April 1993 (aged 23)
Michael Matthews (AUS)	26 September 1990 (aged 26)
Sam Oomen (NED)	15 August 1995 (aged 21)
Georg Preidler (AUT)	17 June 1990 (aged 26)
Ramon Sinkeldam (NED)	9 February 1989 (aged 27)
Tom Stamsnijder (NED)	15 May 1985 (aged 31)
Laurens ten Dam (NED)	13 November 1980 (aged 36)
Mike Teunissen (NED)	25 August 1992 (aged 24)
Albert Timmer (NED)	13 June 1985 (aged 31)
Zico Waeytens (BEL)	29 September 1991 (aged 25)
Max Walscheid (GER)	13 June 1993 (aged 23)

Riders who joined the team for the 2017 season

Rider	2016 team
Phil Bauhaus	Bora–Argon 18
Chris Hamilton	Avanti IsoWhey Sports
Lennard Hofstede	neo-pro (Rabobank Development Team)
Wilco Kelderman	LottoNL–Jumbo
Lennard Kämna	Stölting Service Group
Michael Matthews	Orica–BikeExchange
Mike Teunissen	LottoNL–Jumbo

Riders who left the team during or after the 2016 season

Rider	2017 team
Koen de Kort	Trek–Segafredo
John Degenkolb	Trek–Segafredo
Caleb Fairly	Retired
Ji Cheng	Retired
Carter Jones	Retired
Fredrik Ludvigsson	Copenhagen Pro Cycling
Tobias Ludvigsson	FDJ
Lars van der Haar	Telenet–Fidea Lions
Tom Veelers	Retired

== Season victories ==
Date	Race	Competition	Rider	Country	Location
29 January	Cadel Evans Great Ocean Road Race	UCI World Tour	Nikias Arndt (GER)	Australia	Geelong
16 February	Tour of Oman, Stage 3	UCI Asia Tour	Søren Kragh Andersen (DEN)	Oman	Qurayyat
19 February	Vuelta a Andalucía, Mountains classification	UCI Europe Tour	Georg Preidler (AUT)	Spain	
3 April	Tour of the Basque Country, Stage 1	UCI World Tour	Michael Matthews (AUS)	Spain	Valle de Egüés
16 May	Giro d'Italia, Stage 10	UCI World Tour	Tom Dumoulin (NED)	Italy	Montefalco
20 May	Giro d'Italia, Stage 14	UCI World Tour	Tom Dumoulin (NED)	Italy	Sanctuary of Oropa
28 May	Giro d'Italia, Overall	UCI World Tour	Tom Dumoulin (NED)	Italy	
4 June	Hammer Series, Stage 3	UCI Europe Tour	Team stage (Note: The riders on the stage were Lennard Kämna, Ramon Sinkeldam, Albert Timmer, Zico Waeytens and Max Walscheid)	Netherlands	Sittard-Geleen
8 June	Critérium du Dauphiné, Stage 5	UCI World Tour	Phil Bauhaus (GER)	France	Mâcon
12 June	Tour de Suisse, Stage 3	UCI World Tour	Michael Matthews (AUS)	Switzerland	Bern
14 July	Tour de France, Stage 13	UCI World Tour	Warren Barguil (FRA)	France	Foix
15 July	Tour de France, Stage 14	UCI World Tour	Michael Matthews (AUS)	France	Rodez
18 July	Tour de France, Stage 16	UCI World Tour	Michael Matthews (AUS)	France	Romans-sur-Isère
20 July	Tour de France, Stage 18	UCI World Tour	Warren Barguil (FRA)	France	Col d'Izoard
23 July	Tour de France, Points classification	UCI World Tour	Michael Matthews (AUS)	France	
23 July	Tour de France, Mountains classification	UCI World Tour	Warren Barguil (FRA)	France	
23 July	Tour de France, Super-combativity award	UCI World Tour	Warren Barguil (FRA)	France	
13 August	BinckBank Tour, Overall	UCI World Tour	Tom Dumoulin (NED)	Belgium; Netherlands	

== National, Continental and World champions 2017 ==
Date	Discipline	Jersey	Rider	Country	Location
21 June	Dutch National Time Trial Champion		Tom Dumoulin (NED)	Netherlands	Montferland
21 June	Austrian National Time Trial Champion		Georg Preidler (AUT)	Austria	Grünau im Almtal
25 June	Dutch National Road Race Champion		Ramon Sinkeldam (NED)	Netherlands	Montferland
