= 2017 Movistar Team season =

Movistar Team
- 2017 season
- UCI code: MOV
- Status: UCI WorldTeam
- Manager: Eusebio Unzué
- Main sponsor(s): Telefónica
- Based: Spain
- Bicycles: Canyon
- Groupset: Campagnolo

Season victories
- One-day races: 6
- Stage race overall: 6
- Stage race stages: 17
- National Championships: 2

The 2017 season for Movistar Team began in January at the Tour Down Under. As a UCI WorldTeam, they were automatically invited and obligated to send a squad to every event in the UCI World Tour.

== Team roster ==
As of 1 January 2017.

Rider	Date of birth
Andrey Amador (CRC)	29 August 1986 (aged 30)
Winner Anacona (COL)	11 September 1988 (aged 28)
Jorge Arcas (ESP)	8 July 1992 (aged 24)
Carlos Barbero (ESP)	29 April 1991 (aged 25)
Daniele Bennati (ITA)	24 September 1980 (aged 36)
Carlos Betancur (COL)	13 October 1989 (aged 27)
Nuno Bico (POR)	3 July 1994 (aged 22)
Richard Carapaz (ECU)	20 May 1993 (aged 23)
Héctor Carretero (ESP)	28 May 1995 (aged 21)
Jonathan Castroviejo (ESP)	27 April 1987 (aged 29)
Víctor de la Parte (ESP)	22 June 1986 (aged 30)
Alex Dowsett (GBR)	3 October 1988 (aged 28)
Imanol Erviti (ESP)	15 November 1983 (aged 33)
Rubén Fernández (ESP)	1 March 1991 (aged 25)

Rider	Date of birth
Jesús Herrada (ESP)	26 July 1990 (aged 26)
José Herrada (ESP)	1 October 1985 (aged 31)
Gorka Izagirre (ESP)	7 October 1987 (aged 29)
Adriano Malori (ITA)	28 January 1988 (aged 28)
Daniel Moreno (ESP)	5 September 1981 (aged 35)
Nelson Oliveira (POR)	6 March 1989 (aged 27)
Antonio Pedrero (ESP)	23 October 1991 (aged 25)
Dayer Quintana (COL)	10 August 1992 (aged 24)
Nairo Quintana (COL)	4 February 1990 (aged 26)
José Joaquín Rojas (ESP)	8 June 1985 (aged 31)
Marc Soler (ESP)	22 November 1993 (aged 23)
Rory Sutherland (AUS)	8 February 1982 (aged 34)
Jasha Sütterlin (GER)	4 November 1992 (aged 24)
Alejandro Valverde (ESP)	25 April 1980 (aged 36)

Riders who joined the team for the 2017 season

Rider	2016 team
Carlos Barbero	Caja Rural–Seguros RGA
Daniele Bennati	Tinkoff
Nuno Bico	Klein Constantia
Héctor Carretero	neo-pro (Lizarte)
Víctor de la Parte	CCC–Sprandi–Polkowice

Riders who left the team during or after the 2016 season

Rider	2017 team
Ion Izagirre	Bahrain–Merida
Juan José Lobato	LottoNL–Jumbo
Javier Moreno	Bahrain–Merida
Francisco Ventoso	BMC Racing Team
Giovanni Visconti	Bahrain–Merida

== Season victories ==
Date	Race	Competition	Rider	Country	Location
4 February	Volta a la Comunitat Valenciana, Stage 4	UCI Europe Tour	Nairo Quintana (COL)	Spain	Llucena
5 February	Volta a la Comunitat Valenciana, Overall	UCI Europe Tour	Nairo Quintana (COL)	Spain	
5 February	Volta a la Comunitat Valenciana, Teams classification	UCI Europe Tour	(Note: The riders on the squad were Nairo Quintana, Andrey Amador, Jonathan Castroviejo, Víctor de la Parte, Jesús Herrada, José Herrada, Daniel Moreno and Dayer Quintana)	Spain	
11 February	Vuelta a Murcia	UCI Europe Tour	Alejandro Valverde (ESP)	Spain	Murcia
15 February	Vuelta a Andalucía, Stage 1	UCI Europe Tour	Alejandro Valverde (ESP)	Spain	Granada
17 February	Volta ao Algarve, Stage 3	UCI Europe Tour	Jonathan Castroviejo (ESP)	Portugal	Sagres
19 February	Vuelta a Andalucía, Overall	UCI Europe Tour	Alejandro Valverde (ESP)	Spain	
26 February	Volta ao Alentejo, Overall	UCI Europe Tour	Carlos Barbero (ESP)	Portugal	
26 February	Volta ao Alentejo, Points classification	UCI Europe Tour	Carlos Barbero (ESP)	Portugal	
11 March	Tirreno–Adriatico, Stage 4	UCI World Tour	Nairo Quintana (COL)	Italy	Monte Terminillo
14 March	Tirreno–Adriatico, Overall	UCI World Tour	Nairo Quintana (COL)	Italy	
14 March	Tirreno–Adriatico, Teams classification	UCI World Tour	(Note: The riders on the squad were Nairo Quintana, Andrey Amador, Daniele Bennati, Jonathan Castroviejo, Alex Dowsett, Daniel Moreno, Nelson Oliveira and Jasha Sütterlin)	Italy	
22 March	Volta a Catalunya, Stage 3	UCI World Tour	Alejandro Valverde (ESP)	Spain	La Molina
24 March	Volta a Catalunya, Stage 5	UCI World Tour	Alejandro Valverde (ESP)	Spain	Lo Port
26 March	Volta a Catalunya, Stage 7	UCI World Tour	Alejandro Valverde (ESP)	Spain	Barcelona
26 March	Volta a Catalunya, Overall	UCI World Tour	Alejandro Valverde (ESP)	Spain	
26 March	Volta a Catalunya, Mountains classification	UCI World Tour	Alejandro Valverde (ESP)	Spain	
26 March	Volta a Catalunya, Youth classification	UCI World Tour	Marc Soler (ESP)	Spain	
26 March	Volta a Catalunya, Teams classification	UCI World Tour	(Note: The riders on the squad were Alejandro Valverde, Jonathan Castroviejo, Andrey Amador, José Joaquín Rojas, Rubén Fernández, Imanol Erviti, Nelson Oliveira and Marc Soler)	Spain	
2 April	Vuelta a La Rioja	UCI Europe Tour	Rory Sutherland (AUS)	Spain	Logroño
5 April	Circuit de la Sarthe, Stage 3	UCI Europe Tour	Alex Dowsett (GBR)	France	Angers
7 April	Circuit de la Sarthe, Teams classification	UCI Europe Tour	(Note: The riders on the squad were Daniele Bennati, Jonathan Castroviejo, Jonathan Castroviejo, Alex Dowsett, Jorge Arcas, Carlos Barbero and Carlos Betancur)	France	
7 April	Tour of the Basque Country, Stage 5	UCI World Tour	Alejandro Valverde (ESP)	Spain	Eibar
8 April	Tour of the Basque Country, Overall	UCI World Tour	Alejandro Valverde (ESP)	Spain	
8 April	Tour of the Basque Country, Points classification	UCI World Tour	Alejandro Valverde (ESP)	Spain	
9 April	Klasika Primavera	UCI Europe Tour	Gorka Izagirre (ESP)	Spain	Amorebieta
19 April	La Flèche Wallonne	UCI World Tour	Alejandro Valverde (ESP)	Belgium	Huy
23 April	Liège–Bastogne–Liège	UCI World Tour	Alejandro Valverde (ESP)	Belgium	Ans
30 April	Tour de Romandie, Teams classification	UCI World Tour	(Note: The riders on the squad were Alex Dowsett, Rubén Fernández, Jesús Herrada, Carlos Betancur, Richard Carapaz, Winner Anacona, Andrey Amador and Jonathan Castroviejo)	Switzerland	
30 April	Vuelta a Asturias, Stage 2	UCI Europe Tour	Nairo Quintana (COL)	Spain	Alto del Acebo
6 May	Vuelta a la Comunidad de Madrid, Stage 2	UCI Europe Tour	Carlos Barbero (ESP)	Spain	Valdemoro
7 May	Vuelta a la Comunidad de Madrid, Stage 3	UCI Europe Tour	Jasha Sütterlin (GER)	Spain	Madrid
13 May	Giro d'Italia, Stage 8	UCI World Tour	Gorka Izagirre (ESP)	Italy	Peschici
14 May	Giro d'Italia, Stage 9	UCI World Tour	Nairo Quintana (COL)	Italy	Blockhaus
21 May	Vuelta a Castilla y León, Stage 3	UCI Europe Tour	Carlos Barbero (ESP)	Spain	León
28 May	Giro d'Italia, Teams classification	UCI World Tour	(Note: The riders on the squad were Nairo Quintana, Andrey Amador, Winner Anacona, Daniele Bennati, Víctor de la Parte, José Herrada, Gorka Izagirre, José Joaquín Rojas and Rory Sutherland)	Italy	
2 June	Hammer Series, Stage 1	UCI Europe Tour	Team stage (Note: The riders on the squad were Carlos Barbero, Carlos Betancur, Héctor Carretero, Nelson Oliveira, Alex Dowsett, Nuno Bico and Marc Soler)	Netherlands	Vaals
18 June	Route du Sud, Youth classification	UCI Europe Tour	Richard Carapaz (ECU)	France	
31 July	Circuito de Getxo	UCI Europe Tour	Carlos Barbero (ESP)	Spain	Getxo
4 August	Vuelta a Burgos, Stage 4	UCI Europe Tour	Carlos Barbero (ESP)	Spain	Clunia

== National, Continental and World champions 2017 ==
Date	Discipline	Jersey	Rider	Country	Location
23 June	Spanish National Time Trial Champion		Jonathan Castroviejo (ESP)	Spain	Soria
25 June	Spanish National Road Race Champion		Jesús Herrada (ESP)	Spain	Soria
