= 2017 Katusha–Alpecin season =

bryan Manzi
- Loves ronaldo season
- UCI code: KAT
- Status: UCI WorldTeam
- Manager: Vyacheslav Ekimov
- Main sponsor(s): Gazprom & Itera & Rostec & Alpecin
- Based: Switzerland
- Bicycles: Canyon

Season victories
- One-day races: 2
- Stage race overall: 1
- Stage race stages: 10
- National Championships: 2

The 2017 season for Team Katusha–Alpecin began in January at the Tour Down Under. As a UCI WorldTeam, they were automatically invited and obligated to send a squad to every event in the UCI World Tour.

== Team roster ==
As of 1 January 2017.

Rider	Date of birth
Maxim Belkov (RUS)	9 January 1985 (aged 31)
Jenthe Biermans (BEL)	30 October 1995 (aged 21)
Sven Erik Bystrøm (NOR)	21 January 1992 (aged 24)
José Gonçalves (POR)	13 February 1989 (aged 27)
Marco Haller (AUT)	1 April 1991 (aged 25)
Reto Hollenstein (SUI)	22 August 1985 (aged 31)
Robert Kišerlovski (CRO)	9 August 1986 (aged 30)
Pavel Kochetkov (RUS)	7 March 1986 (aged 30)
Alexander Kristoff (NOR)	5 July 1987 (aged 29)
Vyacheslav Kuznetsov (RUS)	24 June 1989 (aged 27)
Maurits Lammertink (NED)	31 August 1990 (aged 26)
Alberto Losada (ESP)	28 February 1982 (aged 34)
Tiago Machado (POR)	18 October 1985 (aged 31)

Rider	Date of birth
Matvey Mamykin (RUS)	31 October 1994 (aged 22)
Tony Martin (GER)	23 April 1985 (aged 31)
Marco Mathis (GER)	7 April 1994 (aged 22)
Michael Mørkøv (DEN)	30 April 1985 (aged 31)
Baptiste Planckaert (BEL)	28 September 1988 (aged 28)
Nils Politt (GER)	6 March 1994 (aged 22)
Jhonatan Restrepo (COL)	24 November 1994 (aged 22)
Simon Špilak (SLO)	23 June 1986 (aged 30)
Rein Taaramäe (EST)	24 April 1987 (aged 29)
Ángel Vicioso (ESP)	13 April 1977 (aged 39)
Mads Würtz Schmidt (DEN)	31 March 1994 (aged 22)
Rick Zabel (GER)	7 December 1993 (aged 23)
Ilnur Zakarin (RUS)	15 September 1989 (aged 27)

Riders who joined the team for the 2017 season

Rider	2016 team
Jenthe Biermans	SEG Racing Academy
José Gonçalves	Caja Rural–Seguros RGA
Reto Hollenstein	IAM Cycling
Robert Kišerlovski	Tinkoff
Maurits Lammertink	Roompot–Oranje Peloton
Tony Martin	Etixx–Quick-Step
Marco Mathis	Rad-Net Rose Team
Baptiste Planckaert	Wallonie-Bruxelles–Group Protect
Mads Würtz Schmidt	Team Virtu Pro–Véloconcept
Rick Zabel	BMC Racing Team

Riders who left the team during or after the 2016 season

Rider	2017 team
Sergey Chernetskiy	Astana
Jacopo Guarnieri	FDJ
Vladimir Isaichev	
Dmitry Kozonchuk	Gazprom–RusVelo
Sergey Lagutin	Gazprom–RusVelo
Alexander Porsev	Gazprom–RusVelo
Joaquim Rodríguez	Retired
Egor Silin	
Alexey Tsatevich	Gazprom–RusVelo
Jurgen Van den Broeck	LottoNL–Jumbo
Eduard Vorganov	Minsk Cycling Club
Anton Vorobyev	Gazprom–RusVelo

== Season victories ==
Date	Race	Competition	Rider	Country	Location
22 January	Tour Down Under, Youth classification	UCI World Tour	Jhonatan Restrepo (COL)	Australia	
2 February	Volta a la Comunitat Valenciana, Stage 2	UCI Europe Tour	Tony Martin (GER)	Spain	Dénia
2 February	Étoile de Bessèges, Stage 2	UCI Europe Tour	Alexander Kristoff (NOR)	France	Rodilhan
5 February	Étoile de Bessèges, Points classification	UCI Europe Tour	Alexander Kristoff (NOR)	France	
5 February	Étoile de Bessèges, Youth classification	UCI Europe Tour	Mads Würtz Schmidt (DEN)	France	
14 February	Tour of Oman, Stage 1	UCI Asia Tour	Alexander Kristoff (NOR)	Oman	Naseem Park
17 February	Tour of Oman, Stage 4	UCI Asia Tour	Alexander Kristoff (NOR)	Oman	Ministry of Tourism
19 February	Tour of Oman, Stage 6	UCI Asia Tour	Alexander Kristoff (NOR)	Oman	Matrah Corniche
19 February	Tour of Oman, Points classification	UCI Asia Tour	Alexander Kristoff (NOR)	Oman	
29 March	Three Days of De Panne, Stage 2	UCI Europe Tour	Alexander Kristoff (NOR)	Belgium	Koksijde
29 March	Three Days of De Panne, Points classification	UCI Europe Tour	Alexander Kristoff (NOR)	Belgium	
1 May	Eschborn-Frankfurt – Rund um den Finanzplatz	UCI World Tour	Alexander Kristoff (NOR)	Germany	Frankfurt
27 May	Tour of Belgium, Stage 4	UCI Europe Tour	Maurits Lammertink (NED)	Belgium	Ans
16 June	Tour de Suisse, Stage 7	UCI World Tour	Simon Špilak (SLO)	Austria	Sölden
17 June	Ster ZLM Toer, Stage 3	UCI Europe Tour	José Gonçalves (POR)	Belgium	La Gileppe-Jalhay
18 June	Ster ZLM Toer, Overall	UCI Europe Tour	José Gonçalves (POR)	Netherlands	
30 July	RideLondon–Surrey Classic	UCI World Tour	Alexander Kristoff (NOR)	United Kingdom	London
11 August	Arctic Race of Norway, Stage 2	UCI Europe Tour	Alexander Kristoff (NOR)	Norway	Bardufoss

== National, Continental and World champions 2017 ==
Date	Discipline	Jersey	Rider	Country	Location
23 June	Russian National Time Trial Champion		Ilnur Zakarin (RUS)	Russia	Novovoronezh
23 June	German National Time Trial Champion		Tony Martin (GER)	Germany	Chemnitz
6 August	European Road Race Champion		Alexander Kristoff (NOR)	Denmark	Herning
