= 2017 Trek–Segafredo season =

Trek-Segafredo
- 2017 season
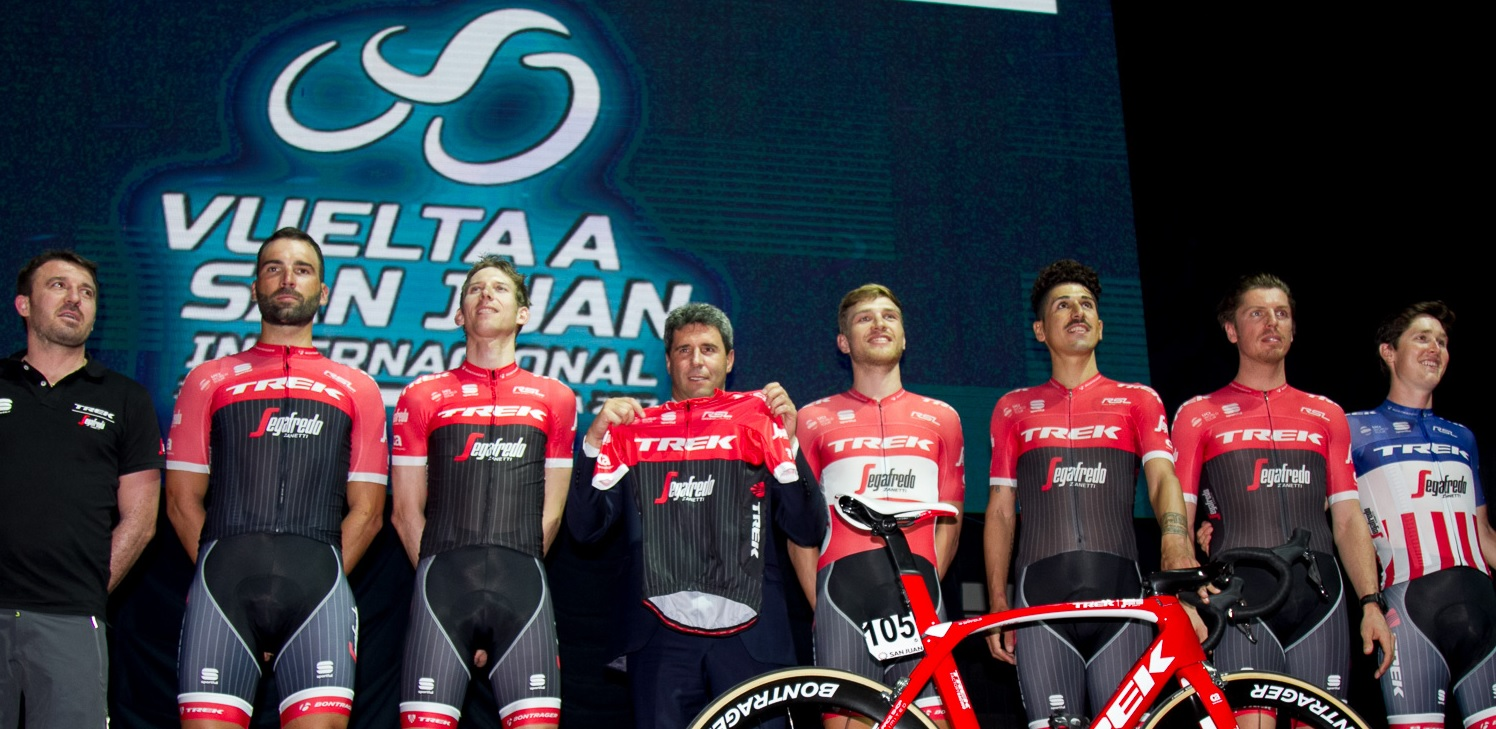
- Trek-Segafredo on 2017 Vuelta a San Juan
- UCI code: TFS
- Status: UCI WorldTeam
- Manager: Luca Guercilena
- Main sponsor(s): Trek
- Based: United States
- Bicycles: Trek
- Groupset: Shimano

Season victories
- One-day races: 0
- Stage race overall: 1
- Stage race stages: 5
- National Championships: 3
- Jersey

The 2017 season for the Trek–Segafredo cycling team began in January at the Tour Down Under. As a UCI WorldTeam, they were automatically invited and obligated to send a squad to every event in the UCI World Tour.

== Team roster ==
As of January 1, 2017.

Rider	Date of birth
Eugenio Alafaci (ITA)	August 9, 1990 (aged 26)
Fumiyuki Beppu (JPN)	April 10, 1983 (aged 33)
Julien Bernard (FRA)	March 17, 1992 (aged 24)
Matthias Brändle (AUT)	December 7, 1989 (aged 27)
André Cardoso (POR)	September 3, 1984 (aged 32)
Marco Coledan (ITA)	August 22, 1988 (aged 28)
Alberto Contador (Note: Contador retired from cycling on September 10, immediately following the Vuelta a España.) (ESP)	December 6, 1982 (aged 34)
Gregory Daniel (USA)	November 8, 1994 (aged 22)
Koen de Kort (NED)	September 8, 1982 (aged 34)
John Degenkolb (GER)	January 7, 1989 (aged 27)
Laurent Didier (LUX)	July 19, 1984 (aged 32)
Fabio Felline (ITA)	March 29, 1990 (aged 26)
Michael Gogl (AUT)	November 4, 1993 (aged 23)
Ruben Guerreiro (POR)	July 6, 1994 (aged 22)

Rider	Date of birth
Jesús Hernández (ESP)	September 28, 1981 (aged 35)
Markel Irizar (ESP)	February 5, 1980 (aged 36)
Bauke Mollema (NED)	November 26, 1986 (aged 30)
Giacomo Nizzolo (ITA)	January 30, 1989 (aged 27)
Jarlinson Pantano (COL)	November 19, 1988 (aged 28)
Mads Pedersen (DEN)	December 18, 1995 (aged 21)
Grégory Rast (SUI)	January 17, 1980 (aged 35)
Kiel Reijnen (USA)	June 1, 1986 (aged 30)
Peter Stetina (USA)	August 8, 1987 (aged 29)
Jasper Stuyven (BEL)	April 17, 1992 (aged 24)
Edward Theuns (BEL)	April 30, 1991 (aged 25)
Boy van Poppel (NED)	January 18, 1988 (aged 28)
Haimar Zubeldia (Note: Zubeldia retired from cycling on July 29, immediately following the Clásica de San Sebastián.) (ESP)	April 1, 1977 (aged 39)

Riders who joined the team for the 2017 season

Rider	2016 team
Matthias Brändle	IAM Cycling
André Cardoso	Cannondale–Drapac
Alberto Contador	Tinkoff
Gregory Daniel	Axeon–Hagens Berman
Koen de Kort	Team Giant–Alpecin
John Degenkolb	Team Giant–Alpecin
Michael Gogl	Tinkoff
Ruben Guerreiro	Axeon–Hagens Berman
Jesús Hernández	Tinkoff
Jarlinson Pantano	IAM Cycling
Mads Pedersen	Stölting Service Group

Riders who left the team during or after the 2016 season

Rider	2017 team
Julián Arredondo	Nippo–Vini Fantini
Jack Bobridge	Retired
Niccolò Bonifazio	Bahrain–Merida
Fabian Cancellara	Retired
Stijn Devolder	Vérandas Willems–Crelan
Ryder Hesjedal	Retired
Yaroslav Popovych	Retired
Fränk Schleck	Retired
Riccardo Zoidl	Team Felbermayr–Simplon Wels

== Season victories ==
Date	Race	Competition	Rider	Country	Location
29 January	Vuelta a San Juan, Overall	UCI America Tour	Bauke Mollema (NED)	Argentina	
2 February	Dubai Tour, Stage 3	UCI Asia Tour	John Degenkolb (GER)	United Arab Emirates	Al Aqah
30 March	Three Days of De Panne, Teams classification	UCI Europe Tour	(Note: The riders on the squad were Edward Theuns, Fumiyuki Beppu, Matthias Brändle, Gregory Daniel, Laurent Didier, Kiel Reijnen, Mads Pedersen and Boy van Poppel)	Belgium	
25 April	Tour de Romandie, Prologue	UCI World Tour	Fabio Felline (ITA)	Switzerland	Aigle
3 June	Hammer Series, Stage 2	UCI Europe Tour	Team stage (Note: The riders on the squad were Matthias Brändle, Gregory Daniel, Ruben Guerreiro, Giacomo Nizzolo, Mads Pedersen, Jasper Stuyven and Boy van Poppel)	Netherlands	Sittard-Geleen
16 July	Tour de France, Stage 15	UCI World Tour	Bauke Mollema (NED)	France	Le Puy-en-Velay
10 August	BinckBank Tour, Stage 4	UCI World Tour	Edward Theuns (BEL)	Belgium	Lanaken
13 August	BinckBank Tour, Stage 7	UCI World Tour	Jasper Stuyven (BEL)	Belgium	Geraardsbergen
13 August	BinckBank Tour, Teams classification	UCI World Tour	(Note: The riders on the squad were Jasper Stuyven, Marco Coledan, Ruben Guerreiro, Mads Pedersen, Grégory Rast, Matthias Brändle, Edward Theuns and Boy van Poppel)	Belgium	

== National, Continental and World champions 2017 ==
Date	Discipline	Jersey	Rider	Country	Location
24 February	Colombia National Time Trial Champion		Jarlinson Pantano (COL)	Colombia	La Calera
25 June	Danish National Road Race Champion		Mads Pedersen (DEN)	Denmark	Grindsted
25 June	Portuguese National Road Race Champion		Ruben Guerreiro (POR)	Portugal	Gondomar
