= 2017 Lotto–Soudal season =

Lotto-Soudal
- 2017 season
- UCI code: LTS
- Status: UCI WorldTeam
- Manager: Marc Sergeant
- Main sponsor(s): Soudal
- Based: Belgium
- Bicycles: Ridley
- Groupset: Campagnolo

Season victories
- One-day races: 4
- Stage race overall: 0
- Stage race stages: 9

The 2017 season for the Lotto–Soudal cycling team began in January at the Tour Down Under. As a UCI WorldTeam, they were automatically invited and obligated to send a squad to every event in the UCI World Tour.

== Team roster ==
As of 1 January 2017.

Rider	Date of birth
Sander Armée (BEL)	10 December 1985 (aged 31)
Lars Bak (DEN)	16 January 1980 (aged 36)
Tiesj Benoot (BEL)	11 March 1994 (aged 22)
Kris Boeckmans (BEL)	13 February 1987 (aged 29)
Sean De Bie (BEL)	3 October 1991 (aged 25)
Jasper De Buyst (BEL)	24 November 1993 (aged 23)
Bart De Clercq (BEL)	26 August 1986 (aged 30)
Thomas De Gendt (BEL)	6 November 1986 (aged 30)
Jens Debusschere (BEL)	28 August 1989 (aged 27)
Frederik Frison (BEL)	28 July 1992 (aged 24)
Tony Gallopin (FRA)	19 April 1988 (aged 28)
André Greipel (GER)	16 July 1982 (aged 34)
Adam Hansen (AUS)	11 May 1981 (aged 35)
Moreno Hofland (NED)	31 August 1991 (aged 25)

Rider	Date of birth
Nikolas Maes (BEL)	9 April 1986 (aged 30)
Tomasz Marczyński (POL)	6 March 1984 (aged 32)
Rémy Mertz (BEL)	17 July 1995 (aged 21)
Maxime Monfort (BEL)	14 January 1983 (aged 33)
Jürgen Roelandts (BEL)	2 July 1985 (aged 31)
James Shaw (GBR)	6 June 1996 (aged 20)
Marcel Sieberg (GER)	30 April 1982 (aged 34)
Rafael Valls (ESP)	27 June 1987 (aged 29)
Tosh Van der Sande (BEL)	28 November 1990 (aged 26)
Jelle Vanendert (BEL)	19 February 1985 (aged 31)
Louis Vervaeke (BEL)	6 November 1993 (aged 23)
Jelle Wallays (BEL)	11 May 1989 (aged 27)
Tim Wellens (BEL)	10 May 1991 (aged 25)
Enzo Wouters (BEL)	21 March 1996 (aged 20)

Riders who joined the team for the 2017 season

Rider	2016 team
Moreno Hofland	LottoNL–Jumbo
Nikolas Maes	Etixx–Quick-Step
Rémy Mertz	Color Code–Arden'Beef
James Shaw	neo-pro (Lotto–Soudal U23)
Enzo Wouters	neo-pro (Lotto–Soudal U23)

Riders who left the team during or after the 2016 season

Rider	2017 team
Stig Broeckx	Retired
Gert Dockx	Retired
Greg Henderson	UnitedHealthcare
Pim Ligthart	Roompot–Nederlandse Loterij

== Season victories ==
Date	Race	Competition	Rider	Country	Location
22 January	Tour Down Under, Mountains classification	UCI World Tour	Thomas De Gendt (BEL)	Australia	
26 January	Trofeo Felanitx-Ses Salines-Campos-Porreres	UCI Europe Tour	André Greipel (GER)	Spain	Campos
27 January	Trofeo Serra de Tramuntana	UCI Europe Tour	Tim Wellens (BEL)	Spain	Deià
28 January	Trofeo Andratx – Mirador d’Es Colomer	UCI Europe Tour	Tim Wellens (BEL)	Spain	Mirador d’Es Colomer
5 February	Étoile de Bessèges, Stage 5	UCI Europe Tour	Tony Gallopin (FRA)	France	Alès
18 February	Volta ao Algarve, Stage 4	UCI Europe Tour	André Greipel (GER)	Portugal	Tavira
19 February	Volta ao Algarve, Points classification	UCI Europe Tour	André Greipel (GER)	Portugal	
19 February	Volta ao Algarve, Youth classification	UCI Europe Tour	Tiesj Benoot (BEL)	Portugal	
19 February	Vuelta a Andalucía, Stage 5	UCI Europe Tour	Tim Wellens (BEL)	Spain	Coín
9 March	Paris–Nice, Stage 5	UCI World Tour	André Greipel (GER)	France	Bourg-de-Péage
30 April	Tour de Romandie, Mountains classification	UCI World Tour	Sander Armée (BEL)	Switzerland	
6 May	Giro d'Italia, Stage 2	UCI World Tour	André Greipel (GER)	Italy	Tortolì
9 May	Four Days of Dunkirk, Stage 1	UCI Europe Tour	Jens Debusschere (BEL)	France	Iwuy
21 May	Tour of Norway, Teams classification	UCI Europe Tour	(Note: The riders on the squad were Tony Gallopin, Sander Armée, Kris Boeckmans, James Shaw, Tosh Van der Sande and Louis Vervaeke)	Norway	
28 May	Tour of Belgium, Stage 5	UCI Europe Tour	Jens Debusschere (BEL)	Belgium	Tongeren
28 May	Tour of Belgium, Points classification	UCI Europe Tour	Jens Debusschere (BEL)	Belgium	
3 June	Heistse Pijl	UCI Europe Tour	Jasper De Buyst (BEL)	Belgium	Heist-op-den-Berg
4 June	Critérium du Dauphiné, Stage 1	UCI World Tour	Thomas De Gendt (BEL)	France	Saint-Étienne
23 July	Tour de Wallonie, Stage 2	UCI Europe Tour	Jasper De Buyst (BEL)	Belgium	Seraing
4 August	Tour de Pologne, Teams classification	UCI World Tour	(Note: The riders on the squad were Sander Armée, Jens Debusschere, Bart De Clercq, Tomasz Marczyński, Maxime Monfort, Rafael Valls and Jelle Wallays)	Poland	
12 August	BinckBank Tour, Stage 6	UCI World Tour	Tim Wellens (BEL)	Belgium	Houffalize
