= 2017 Team Bahrain–Merida season =

Bahrain–Merida Pro Cycling Team
- 2017 season
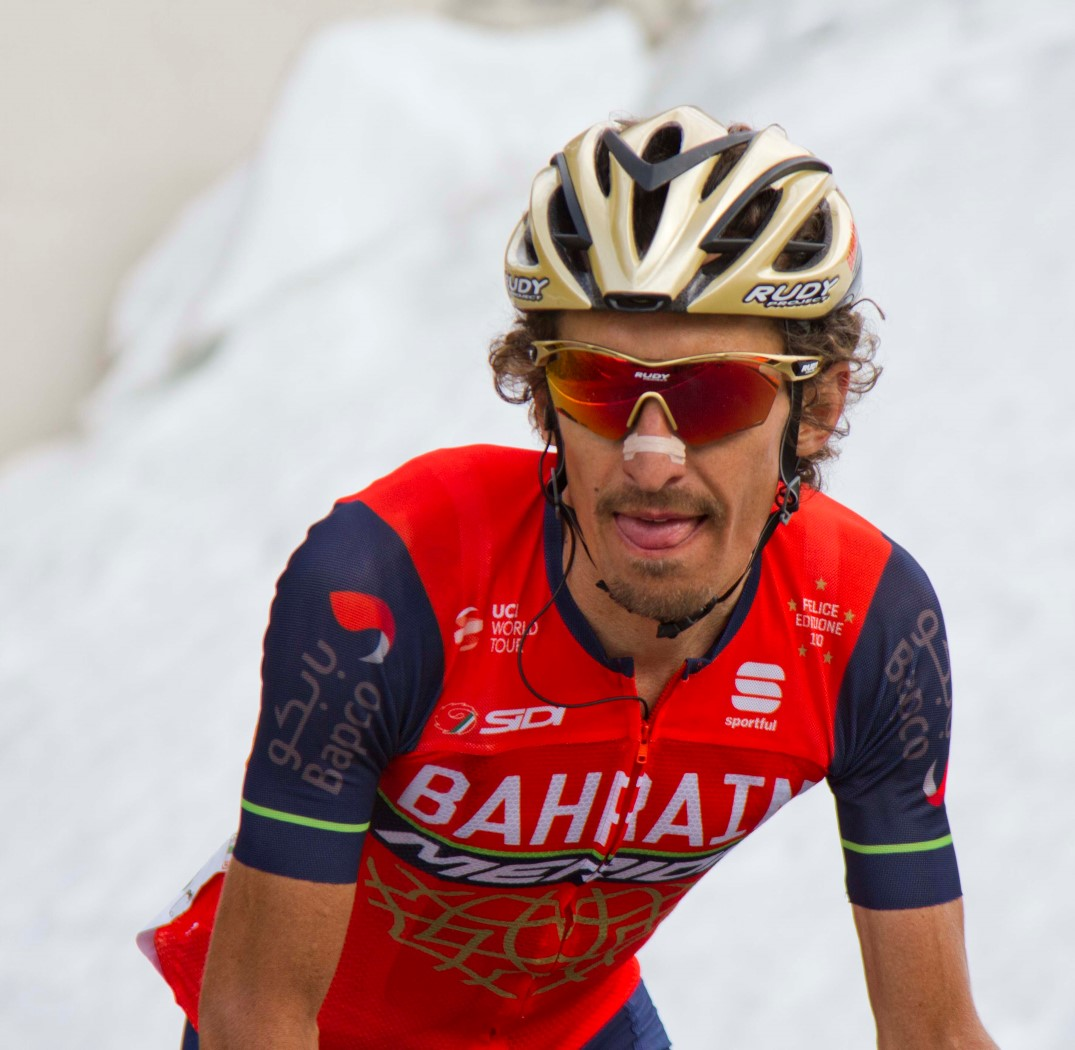
- Franco Pellizotti in Giro d'Italia 2017
- UCI code: TBM
- Status: UCI WorldTeam
- Manager: Brent Copeland
- Based: Bahrain

Season victories
- One-day races: 1
- Stage race overall: 1
- Stage race stages: 4
- National Championships: 1

The 2017 Bahrain–Merida Pro Cycling season was the first season of the Bahrain–Merida team, which was founded in 2016. As a UCI WorldTeam, they were automatically invited and obligated to send a squad to every event in the UCI World Tour, and their season began in January with the Tour Down Under.

== Team roster ==
As of 1 January 2017.

Rider	Date of birth
Valerio Agnoli (ITA)	6 January 1985 (aged 31)
Yukiya Arashiro (JPN)	22 September 1984 (aged 32)
Manuele Boaro (ITA)	12 March 1987 (aged 29)
Grega Bole (SLO)	13 August 1985 (aged 31)
Niccolò Bonifazio (ITA)	9 October 1993 (aged 23)
Borut Božič (SLO)	8 August 1980 (aged 36)
Janez Brajkovič (SLO)	18 December 1983 (aged 33)
Ondřej Cink (CZE)	7 December 1990 (aged 26)
Sonny Colbrelli (ITA)	17 May 1990 (aged 26)
Chun-kai Feng (TWN)	2 November 1988 (aged 28)
Iván García (ESP)	20 November 1995 (aged 21)
Enrico Gasparotto (ITA)	22 March 1982 (aged 34)
Tsgabu Grmay (ETH)	25 August 1991 (aged 25)
Heinrich Haussler (AUS)	25 February 1984 (aged 32)

Rider	Date of birth
Jon Ander Insausti (ESP)	13 December 1982 (aged 34)
Ion Izagirre (ESP)	4 February 1989 (aged 27)
Javier Moreno (ESP)	18 July 1984 (aged 32)
Ramūnas Navardauskas (LTU)	30 January 1988 (aged 28)
Antonio Nibali (ITA)	23 September 1992 (aged 24)
Vincenzo Nibali (ITA)	14 November 1984 (aged 32)
Domen Novak (SLO)	12 July 1995 (aged 21)
Franco Pellizotti (ITA)	15 January 1978 (aged 38)
David Per (SLO)	13 February 1995 (aged 21)
Luka Pibernik (SLO)	23 October 1993 (aged 23)
Kanstantsin Sivtsov (BLR)	9 August 1982 (aged 34)
Giovanni Visconti (ITA)	13 January 1983 (aged 33)
Wang Meiyin (CHN)	26 December 1988 (aged 28)

Riders who joined the team for the 2017 season

Rider	2016 team
Valerio Agnoli	Astana
Yukiya Arashiro	Lampre–Merida
Manuele Boaro	Tinkoff
Grega Bole	Lampre–Merida
Niccolò Bonifazio	Trek–Segafredo
Borut Božič	Cofidis
Janez Brajkovič	UnitedHealthcare
Ondřej Cink	neo-pro
Sonny Colbrelli	Bardiani–CSF
Feng Chun-kai	Lampre–Merida
Iván García	Klein Constantia
Enrico Gasparotto	Wanty–Groupe Gobert
Tsgabu Grmay	Lampre–Merida
Heinrich Haussler	IAM Cycling

Riders who joined the team for the 2017 season

Rider	2016 team
Jon Ander Insausti	Euskadi Basque Country–Murias
Ion Izagirre	Movistar Team
Javier Moreno	Movistar Team
Ramūnas Navardauskas	Cannondale–Drapac
Antonio Nibali	Nippo–Vini Fantini
Vincenzo Nibali	Astana
Domen Novak	Adria Mobil
Franco Pellizotti	Androni Giocattoli–Sidermec
David Per	Adria Mobil
Luka Pibernik	Lampre–Merida
Kanstantsin Sivtsov	Team Dimension Data
Giovanni Visconti	Movistar Team
Wang Meiyin	Wisdom–Hengxiang Cycling Team

== Season victories ==
Date	Race	Competition	Rider	Country	Location
25 January	Vuelta a San Juan, Stage 3	UCI America Tour	Ramūnas Navardauskas (LTU)	Argentina	San Juan
29 January	Vuelta a San Juan, Teams classification	UCI America Tour	(Note: The riders on the squad were Vincenzo Nibali, Valerio Agnoli, Manuele Boaro, Ramūnas Navardauskas, Franco Pellizotti and Kanstantsin Sivtsov)	Argentina	
6 March	Paris–Nice, Stage 2	UCI World Tour	Sonny Colbrelli (ITA)	France	Amilly
8 April	Tour of the Basque Country, Teams classification	UCI World Tour	(Note: The riders on the squad were Ion Izagirre, Yukiya Arashiro, Grega Bole, Ondřej Cink, Tsgabu Grmay, Antonio Nibali, Janez Brajkovič and Giovanni Visconti)	Spain	
12 April	Brabantse Pijl	UCI Europe Tour	Sonny Colbrelli (ITA)	Belgium	Overijse
23 April	Tour of Croatia, Overall	UCI Europe Tour	Vincenzo Nibali (ITA)	Croatia	
23 May	Giro d'Italia, Stage 16	UCI World Tour	Vincenzo Nibali (ITA)	Italy	Bormio
28 May	Tour of Japan, Stage 8	UCI Asia Tour	Jon Ander Insausti (ESP)	Japan	Tokyo
28 May	Tour of Japan, Youth classification	UCI Asia Tour	Domen Novak (SLO)	Japan	Tokyo

== National, Continental and World champions 2017 ==
Date	Discipline	Jersey	Rider	Country	Location
23 June	Ethiopian National Time Trial Champion		Tsgabu Grmay (ETH)	Ethiopia	
