= 2017 Clásica de San Sebastián =

Cycling race

2017 UCI World Tour, race 26 of 37

Race details
- Dates: 29 July 2017
- Stages: 1
- Distance: 231 km (143.5 mi)
- Winning time: 5h 52' 53"

Results
	Winner	Michał Kwiatkowski (POL)	(Team Sky)
	Second	Tony Gallopin (FRA)	(Lotto–Soudal)
	Third	Bauke Mollema (NED)	(Trek–Segafredo)

The 2017 Clásica de San Sebastián was a road cycling one-day race that took place on 29 July in San Sebastián, Spain. It was the 37th edition of the Clásica de San Sebastián and the twenty-sixth event of the 2017 UCI World Tour.

The race was won by Team Sky's Michał Kwiatkowski in a five-rider group sprint, ahead of former race winners Tony Gallopin (Lotto–Soudal) and Trek–Segafredo's Bauke Mollema.

== Teams ==
As Clásica de San Sebastián was a UCI World Tour event, all eighteen UCI WorldTeams were invited automatically and obliged to enter a team in the race. Two UCI Professional Continental teams – Caja Rural–Seguros RGA and Cofidis – competed, completing the 20-team peloton.

UCI WorldTeams

- AG2R La Mondiale
- Astana
- Bahrain–Merida
- BMC Racing Team
- Bora–Hansgrohe
- Cannondale–Drapac
- Team Dimension Data
- FDJ
- Team Katusha–Alpecin
- LottoNL–Jumbo
- Lotto–Soudal
- Movistar Team
- Orica–Scott
- Quick-Step Floors
- Team Sky
- Team Sunweb
- Trek–Segafredo
- UAE Team Emirates

UCI Professional Continental teams

- Caja Rural–Seguros RGA
- Cofidis

== Result ==
Result
Rank	Rider	Team	Time
1	Michał Kwiatkowski (POL)	Team Sky	5h 52' 53"
2	Tony Gallopin (FRA)	Lotto–Soudal	+ 0"
3	Bauke Mollema (NED)	Trek–Segafredo	+ 0"
4	Tom Dumoulin (NED)	Team Sunweb	+ 0"
5	Mikel Landa (ESP)	Team Sky	+ 2"
6	Alberto Bettiol (ITA)	Cannondale–Drapac	+ 28"
7	Anthony Roux (FRA)	FDJ	+ 38"
8	Greg Van Avermaet (BEL)	BMC Racing Team	+ 38"
9	Tiesj Benoot (BEL)	Lotto–Soudal	+ 38"
10	Nicolas Roche (IRL)	BMC Racing Team	+ 38"
