= 2017 UCI World Tour =

Road cycling competitions

2017 UCI WorldTour
- Seventh edition of the UCI World Tour

Details
- Dates: 17 January – 24 October
- Location: Australia; China; Europe; Middle East; North America
- Races: 37

Champions
- Individual champion: Greg Van Avermaet (Belgium) (BMC Racing Team)
- Teams' champion: Team Sky

The 2017 UCI World Tour was a competition that included thirty-seven road cycling events throughout the 2017 men's cycling season. It was the ninth edition of the ranking system launched by the Union Cycliste Internationale (UCI) in 2009. The competition started with the opening stage of the Tour Down Under on 17 January and concluded with the final stage of the Tour of Guangxi on 24 October. Slovakia's Peter Sagan was the defending champion. The 2017 edition featured ten new events.

Sagan was unable to defend his World Tour title, winning just one race overall at the Grand Prix Cycliste de Québec in September, as he finished fourth in the points rankings; he finished one point behind third-placed Tom Dumoulin. The rankings were topped for the first time by Belgian rider Greg Van Avermaet, riding for the BMC Racing Team, who amassed 3,582 points with the newly-enlarged points-scoring system over the course of the season. Van Avermaet led the standings for the majority of the season, winning four races overall; three on home soil at Omloop Het Nieuwsblad, E3 Harelbeke, and Gent–Wevelgem, with a single win in France at Paris–Roubaix. Van Avermaet finished 130 points clear of Great Britain's Chris Froome, riding for Team Sky. Froome won two of the three Grand Tours to be held in 2017, winning his fourth Tour de France, before taking a first Vuelta a España success, the first Tour–Vuelta double in 39 years. The success gave him the World Tour points lead for several hours before Van Avermaet surpassed him with a seventh-place finish at the Grand Prix Cycliste de Montréal.

In the concurrent teams' standings, Team Sky prevailed with 12,806 points, as Froome's victories were added to by Michał Kwiatkowski (Strade Bianche, Milan–San Remo and Clásica de San Sebastián), Sergio Henao (Paris–Nice) and Elia Viviani (EuroEyes Cyclassics and Bretagne Classic Ouest–France). 154 points behind in second place were Quick-Step Floors, who took 30 victories on World Tour races (including 16 Grand Tour stages) during the 2017 season, with overall victories for Yves Lampaert (Dwars door Vlaanderen) and Philippe Gilbert (Tour of Flanders and Amstel Gold Race). With 10,961 points, BMC Racing Team finished in third place primarily down to Van Avermaet's performances, with further wins to Richie Porte (Tour Down Under and Tour de Romandie) and Dylan Teuns at the Tour de Pologne.

== Teams ==
2017 UCI World Teams and equipment
Code	Official Team Name	Country	Groupset	Road Bike(s)	Time Trial Bike	Wheels
ALM	AG2R La Mondiale (2017 season)	France	Shimano	Factor Bikes 02; Factor Bikes ONE; Factor Bikes ONE–S	Factor Bikes Slick	Mavic
AST	Astana (2017 season)	Kazakhstan	Shimano / FSA	Argon 18 Gallium Pro; Argon 18 Nitrogen Pro	E-118 Next	Vision Wheels
TBM	Bahrain–Merida (2017 season)	Bahrain	Shimano	Merida Scultura; Merida Reacto	Merida Warp	Fulcrum
BMC	BMC Racing Team (2017 season)	United States	Shimano	BMC Teammachine SLR01; BMC Timemachine TMR01; BMC Granfondo GF01	BMC TimeMachine TM01	Shimano
BOH	Bora–Hansgrohe (2017 season)	Germany	TBC	Specialized Venge; S-Works Tarmac; Specialized Roubaix	Specialized Shiv	Roval
CDT	Cannondale–Drapac (2017 season)	United States	Shimano	Cannondale SuperSix EVO; Cannondale Synapse	Cannondale Slice	Mavic
DDD	Team Dimension Data (2017 season)	South Africa	Shimano/Rotor	Cervélo S5; Cervélo R5; Cervélo C5	Cervélo P5	Enve
FDJ	FDJ (2017 season)	France	Shimano	Lapierre Xelius SL; Lapierre Aircode SL; Lapierre Pulsium	Lapierre Aerostorm DRS	Shimano
KAT	Team Katusha–Alpecin (2017 season)	Switzerland	SRAM	Canyon Ultimate CF SLX; Canyon Aeroad CF SLX; Canyon Endurance CF SL	Canyon Speedmax CF	Zipp
TLJ	LottoNL–Jumbo (2017 season)	Netherlands	Shimano	Bianchi OltreXR2; Bianchi Specialissima; Bianchi Infinito CV	Bianchi Aquila CV	Shimano
LTS	Lotto–Soudal (2017 season)	Belgium	Campagnolo	Ridley Helium SLX; Ridley Noah SL; Ridley Fenix SL	Ridley Dean Fast	Campagnolo
MOV	Movistar Team (2017 season)	Spain	Campagnolo	Canyon Ultimate CF SLX; Canyon Aeroad CF SLX	Canyon Speedmax CF	Campagnolo
ORS	Orica–Scott (2017 season)	Australia	Shimano	Scott Foil; Scott Addict	Scott Plasma	Shimano
QST	Quick-Step Floors (2017 season)	Belgium	Shimano; FSA	Specialized Venge; S-Works Tarmac; Specialized Roubaix	Specialized Shiv	Roval; HED
SKY	Team Sky (2017 season)	Great Britain	Shimano	Pinarello Dogma F8; Pinarello Dogma K8-S	Pinarello Bolide	Shimano
SUN	Team Sunweb (2017 season)	Germany	Shimano	Giant TCR Advanced SL; Giant Propel Advanced SL; Giant Defy Advanced SL	Giant Trinity	Shimano
TFS	Trek–Segafredo (2017 season)	United States	Shimano	Trek Emonda; Trek Madone; Trek Domane	Trek SpeedConcept	Bontrager
UAD	UAE Team Emirates (2017 season)	United Arab Emirates	Campagnolo	Colnago C60; Colnago Concept; Colnago V1-R	Colnago K-Zero	Campagnolo

== Events ==
All events from the 2016 UCI World Tour were included, although some events were scheduled on different dates than previous editions. Ten new events were also added to the calendar. An eleventh event, the Tour of Qatar, was originally added to the calendar in October 2016, but it was cancelled in December 2016 due to lack of sponsorship support. Another new-for-2017 World Tour event, the Presidential Tour of Turkey, was postponed from its initial dates of 18–23 April, in February. In March, following a meeting of the UCI Professional Cycling Council, the race was rescheduled for 10–15 October.

A new points ranking was also introduced for the 2017 season, based upon the points scales for the UCI World Ranking. Therefore, up to 60 riders – up from a maximum of 20 riders at the Grand Tours – would be able to score points in all races. As well as the new points rankings, the previous ranking by nations was also removed.

Just as in 2016, the team time trial at the UCI World Championships, scheduled to be held on 17 September, had been due to award points towards the team rankings. In August 2017, the Association International des Groupes Cyclistes Professionels (AIGCP) agreed a deal with the UCI to avoid a boycott of the race, but no points would be awarded towards the World Tour rankings.

Races in the 2017 UCI World Tour
Race	Date	Winner		Second		Third		Stage points	Leader points
(Australia) Tour Down Under	17–22 January	Richie Porte (AUS)	500 pts	Esteban Chaves (COL)	400 pts	Jay McCarthy (AUS)	325 pts	60, 25, 10	10 pts
(Australia) Great Ocean Road Race	29 January	Nikias Arndt (GER)	300 pts	Simon Gerrans (AUS)	250 pts	Cameron Meyer (AUS)	0 pts (Note: As Meyer rode for the Australian national team, which is not a UCI WorldTeam, he was ineligible to score points towards the UCI World Tour standings.)	—N/a	
(United Arab Emirates) Abu Dhabi Tour	23–26 February	Rui Costa (POR)	300 pts	Ilnur Zakarin (RUS)	250 pts	Tom Dumoulin (NED)	215 pts	40, 15, 6	6 pts
(Belgium) Omloop Het Nieuwsblad	25 February	Greg Van Avermaet (BEL)	300 pts	Peter Sagan (SVK)	250 pts	Sep Vanmarcke (BEL)	215 pts	—N/a	
(Italy) Strade Bianche	4 March	Michał Kwiatkowski (POL)	300 pts	Greg Van Avermaet (BEL)	250 pts	Tim Wellens (BEL)	215 pts	—N/a	
(France) Paris–Nice	5–12 March	Sergio Henao (COL)	500 pts	Alberto Contador (ESP)	400 pts	Dan Martin (IRL)	325 pts	60, 25, 10	10 pts
(Italy) Tirreno–Adriatico	8–14 March	Nairo Quintana (COL)	500 pts	Rohan Dennis (AUS)	400 pts	Thibaut Pinot (FRA)	325 pts	60, 25, 10	10 pts
(Italy) Milan–San Remo	18 March	Michał Kwiatkowski (POL)	500 pts	Peter Sagan (SVK)	400 pts	Julian Alaphilippe (FRA)	325 pts	—N/a	
(Spain) Volta a Catalunya	20–26 March	Alejandro Valverde (ESP)	400 pts	Alberto Contador (ESP)	320 pts	Marc Soler (ESP)	260 pts	50, 20, 8	8 pts
(Belgium) Dwars door Vlaanderen	22 March	Yves Lampaert (BEL)	300 pts	Philippe Gilbert (BEL)	250 pts	Alexey Lutsenko (KAZ)	215 pts	—N/a	
(Belgium) E3 Harelbeke	24 March	Greg Van Avermaet (BEL)	400 pts	Philippe Gilbert (BEL)	320 pts	Oliver Naesen (BEL)	260 pts	—N/a	
(Belgium) Gent–Wevelgem	26 March	Greg Van Avermaet (BEL)	500 pts	Jens Keukeleire (BEL)	400 pts	Peter Sagan (SVK)	325 pts	—N/a	
(Belgium) Tour of Flanders	2 April	Philippe Gilbert (BEL)	500 pts	Greg Van Avermaet (BEL)	400 pts	Niki Terpstra (NED)	325 pts	—N/a	
(Spain) Tour of the Basque Country	3–8 April	Alejandro Valverde (ESP)	400 pts	Alberto Contador (ESP)	320 pts	Ion Izagirre (ESP)	260 pts	50, 20, 8	8 pts
(France) Paris–Roubaix	9 April	Greg Van Avermaet (BEL)	500 pts	Zdeněk Štybar (CZE)	400 pts	Sebastian Langeveld (NED)	325 pts	—N/a	
(Netherlands) Amstel Gold Race	16 April	Philippe Gilbert (BEL)	500 pts	Michał Kwiatkowski (POL)	400 pts	Michael Albasini (SUI)	325 pts	—N/a	
(Belgium) La Flèche Wallonne	19 April	Alejandro Valverde (ESP)	400 pts	Dan Martin (IRL)	320 pts	Dylan Teuns (BEL)	260 pts	—N/a	
(Belgium) Liège–Bastogne–Liège	23 April	Alejandro Valverde (ESP)	500 pts	Dan Martin (IRL)	400 pts	Michał Kwiatkowski (POL)	325 pts	—N/a	
(Switzerland) Tour de Romandie	25–30 April	Richie Porte (AUS)	500 pts	Simon Yates (GBR)	400 pts	Primož Roglič (SLO)	325 pts	60, 25, 10	10 pts
(Germany) Eschborn-Frankfurt – Rund um den Finanzplatz	1 May	Alexander Kristoff (NOR)	300 pts	Rick Zabel (GER)	250 pts	John Degenkolb (GER)	215 pts	—N/a	
(Italy) Giro d'Italia	5–28 May	Tom Dumoulin (NED)	850 pts	Nairo Quintana (COL)	680 pts	Vincenzo Nibali (ITA)	575 pts	100, 40, 20, 12, 4	20 pts
(United States) Tour of California	14–20 May	George Bennett (NZL)	300 pts	Rafał Majka (POL)	250 pts	Andrew Talansky (USA)	215 pts	40, 15, 6	6 pts
(France) Critérium du Dauphiné	4–11 June	Jakob Fuglsang (DEN)	500 pts	Richie Porte (AUS)	400 pts	Dan Martin (IRL)	325 pts	60, 25, 10	10 pts
(Switzerland) Tour de Suisse	10–18 June	Simon Špilak (SLO)	500 pts	Damiano Caruso (ITA)	400 pts	Steven Kruijswijk (NED)	325 pts	60, 25, 10	10 pts
Tour de France	1–23 July	Chris Froome (GBR)	1000 pts	Rigoberto Urán (COL)	800 pts	Romain Bardet (FRA)	675 pts	120, 50, 25, 15, 5	25 pts
(Spain) Clásica de San Sebastián	29 July	Michał Kwiatkowski (POL)	400 pts	Tony Gallopin (FRA)	320 pts	Bauke Mollema (NED)	260 pts	—N/a	
(Poland) Tour de Pologne	29 July – 4 August	Dylan Teuns (BEL)	400 pts	Rafał Majka (POL)	320 pts	Wout Poels (NED)	260 pts	50, 20, 8	8 pts
(United Kingdom) RideLondon–Surrey Classic	30 July	Alexander Kristoff (NOR)	300 pts	Magnus Cort (DEN)	250 pts	Michael Matthews (AUS)	215 pts	—N/a	
(Belgium) / (Netherlands) BinckBank Tour	7–13 August	Tom Dumoulin (NED)	400 pts	Tim Wellens (BEL)	320 pts	Jasper Stuyven (BEL)	260 pts	50, 20, 8	8 pts
(Spain) Vuelta a España	19 August – 10 September	Chris Froome (GBR)	850 pts	Vincenzo Nibali (ITA)	680 pts	Ilnur Zakarin (RUS)	575 pts	100, 40, 20, 12, 4	20 pts
(Germany) EuroEyes Cyclassics	20 August	Elia Viviani (ITA)	400 pts	Arnaud Démare (FRA)	320 pts	Dylan Groenewegen (NED)	260 pts	—N/a	
Bretagne Classic Ouest–France	27 August	Elia Viviani (ITA)	400 pts	Alexander Kristoff (NOR)	320 pts	Sonny Colbrelli (ITA)	260 pts	—N/a	
(Canada) GP de Québec	8 September	Peter Sagan (SVK)	500 pts	Greg Van Avermaet (BEL)	400 pts	Michael Matthews (AUS)	325 pts	—N/a	
(Canada) GP de Montréal	10 September	Diego Ulissi (ITA)	500 pts	Jesús Herrada (ESP)	400 pts	Tom-Jelte Slagter (NED)	325 pts	—N/a	
(Italy) Il Lombardia	7 October	Vincenzo Nibali (ITA)	500 pts	Julian Alaphilippe (FRA)	400 pts	Gianni Moscon (ITA)	325 pts	—N/a	
Presidential Tour of Turkey	10–15 October	Diego Ulissi (ITA)	300 pts	Jesper Hansen (DEN)	250 pts	Fausto Masnada (ITA)	0 pts (Note: As Masnada was riding for Androni–Sidermec–Bottecchia, which is not a UCI WorldTeam, he was ineligible to score points towards the UCI World Tour standings.)	40, 15, 6	6 pts
(China) Tour of Guangxi	19–24 October	Tim Wellens (BEL)	300 pts	Bauke Mollema (NED)	250 pts	Nicolas Roche (IRL)	215 pts	40, 15, 6	6 pts

== Final points standings ==
=== Individual ===
Riders tied with the same number of points were classified by number of victories, then number of second places, third places, and so on, in World Tour events and stages.

Rank	Name	Team	Points
1	Greg Van Avermaet (BEL)	BMC Racing Team	3582
2	Chris Froome (GBR)	Team Sky	3452
3	Tom Dumoulin (NED)	Team Sunweb	2545
4	Peter Sagan (SVK)	Bora–Hansgrohe	2544
5	Vincenzo Nibali (ITA)	Bahrain–Merida	2196
6	Michał Kwiatkowski (POL)	Team Sky	2171
7	Alejandro Valverde (ESP)	Movistar Team	2105
8	Dan Martin (IRL)	Quick-Step Floors	2050
9	Michael Matthews (AUS)	Team Sunweb	2049
10	Alberto Contador (ESP)	Trek–Segafredo	1987
11	Philippe Gilbert (BEL)	Quick-Step Floors	1893
12	Richie Porte (AUS)	BMC Racing Team	1882
13	Nairo Quintana (COL)	Movistar Team	1811
14	Alexander Kristoff (NOR)	Team Katusha–Alpecin	1806
15	Ilnur Zakarin (RUS)	Team Katusha–Alpecin	1686
16	Diego Ulissi (ITA)	UAE Team Emirates	1569
17	Bauke Mollema (NED)	Trek–Segafredo	1524
18	Julian Alaphilippe (FRA)	Quick-Step Floors	1465
19	Romain Bardet (FRA)	AG2R La Mondiale	1464
20	Rigoberto Urán (COL)	Cannondale–Drapac	1360
21	Tim Wellens (BEL)	Lotto–Soudal	1326
22	Thibaut Pinot (FRA)	FDJ	1317
23	Ion Izagirre (ESP)	Bahrain–Merida	1276
24	Domenico Pozzovivo (ITA)	AG2R La Mondiale	1275
25	Sergio Henao (COL)	Team Sky	1266

- 436 riders scored points. 200 other riders finished in positions that would have earned them points, but they were ineligible as members of non-UCI WorldTeams.

=== Team ===
Team rankings were calculated by adding the ranking points of all the riders of a team in the table.

Rank	Team	Points	Point-scoring riders
1	Team Sky	12806	27 riders Froome (3452), Kwiatkowski (2171), Ser. Henao (1266), Landa (1170), Viviani (1031), Poels (797), Moscon (690), Thomas (611), Nieve (427), Rowe (263), D. van Poppel (151), Boswell (129), Geoghegan Hart (120), Kennaugh (113), Rosa (101), Seb. Henao (52), Kiryienka (51), Dibben (45), D. López (37), Stannard (24), Deignan (23), Gołaś (21), Puccio (20), Elissonde (17), Wiśniowski (11), Doull (8), Knees (5)
2	Quick-Step Floors	12652	27 riders D. Martin (2050), Gilbert (1893), Alaphilippe (1465), Gaviria (1159), Jungels (704), Kittel (686), Trentin (677), Štybar (667), Terpstra (649), Lampaert (471), de la Cruz (452), Vakoč (420), Boonen (339), Richeze (248), Brambilla (162), Mas (102), Devenyns (94), Bauer (84), Vermote (72), De Plus (68), Cavagna (58), Schachmann (50), Serry (40), Keisse (23), Capecchi (13), Declercq (5), Martinelli (1)
3	BMC Racing Team	10961	28 riders Van Avermaet (3582), Porte (1882), Dennis (830), (Note: Listed on 810 by the UCI; missing leader points at the Vuelta a España.) Teuns (763), Caruso (735), (Note: Listed on 755 by the UCI; attributed leader points at the Vuelta a España when not the leader.) van Garderen (735), Roche (522), Drucker (384), Küng (335), Dillier (215), Bookwalter (209), (Note: Listed on 217 by the UCI; attributed leader points at the Volta a Catalunya when not the leader.) Hermans (193), (Note: Listed on 185 by the UCI; missing leader points at the Volta a Catalunya.) Vliegen (80), Oss (75), S. Sánchez (69), Schär (62), Ventoso (52), Wyss (45), Bohli (41), Moinard (36), De Marchi (35), Quinziato (33), Frankiny (19), Rosskopf (16), Senni (5), Gerts (4), Scotson (3), Elmiger (1)
4	Team Sunweb	8033	22 riders T. Dumoulin (2545), Matthews (2049), Kelderman (1049), Barguil (977), Arndt (377), Oomen (367), Kragh Andersen (119), Teunissen (110), Bauhaus (104), ten Dam (69), Preidler (51), Sinkeldam (42), Geschke (42), Walscheid (38), Hofstede (33), Hamilton (18), De Backer (14), Kämna (11), Curvers (8), Fröhlinger (5), Haga (3), Lunke (2)
5	Trek–Segafredo	7934	24 riders Contador (1987), Mollema (1524), Stuyven (1120), Degenkolb (990), Felline (749), Theuns (418), Pantano (246), Guerreiro (208), Gogl (149), Zubeldia (111), Stetina (82), de Kort (59), Reijnen (41), Cardoso (41), Bernard (35), Nizzolo (32), Hernández (29), B. van Poppel (28), Rast (26), Didier (22), Brändle (15), Beppu (12), Pedersen (5), Daniel (5)
6	Movistar Team	7399	26 riders Valverde (2105), N. Quintana (1811), Je. Herrada (668), G. Izagirre (500), Soler (462), Rojas (393), Castroviejo (229), D. Moreno (170), Sütterlin (163), Amador (121), de la Parte (106), Bennati (101), Betancur (100), Fernández (66), Anacona (63), Oliveira (61), Jo. Herrada (54), Barbero (52), Carapaz (43), Dowsett (35), Erviti (34), D. Quintana (24), Pedrero (15), Sutherland (12), Carretero (8), Arcas (3)
7	Orica–Scott	7190	24 riders S. Yates (1067), Albasini (830), A. Yates (776), Chaves (619), Keukeleire (608), Ewan (608), Durbridge (577), Cort (432), Gerrans (281), Haig (273), Impey (230), Verona (155), Kreuziger (150), Juul-Jensen (134), Hayman (104), Mezgec (98), Howson (82), Docker (77), Edmondson (38), Plaza (32), Hepburn (16), Kluge (1), Tuft (1), Bewley (1)
8	Bora–Hansgrohe	6516	25 riders P. Sagan (2544), Majka (1117), S. Bennett (548), McCarthy (505), Pöstlberger (414), Buchmann (389), Konrad (353), Bodnar (142), Poljański (125), Burghardt (74), Selig (68), Mühlberger (45), J. Sagan (40), Mendes (28), Herklotz (24), Schwarzmann (22), Pelucchi (15), Pfingsten (14), Saramotins (12), Ackermann (11), Bárta (10), König (5), Schillinger (5), Benedetti (5), Archbold (1)
9	AG2R La Mondiale	6316	26 riders Bardet (1464), Pozzovivo (1275), Naesen (910), Vuillermoz (881), Bakelants (515), Frank (304), Barbier (166), Latour (155), Gautier (95), Houle (64), Gastauer (62), Jaurégui (60), Dupont (52), Cherel (46), Domont (43), Bidard (38), Bagdonas (34), Montaguti (27), Peters (26), Geniez (24), Vandenbergh (22), Gougeard (21), Duval (13), Chevrier (13), Denz (5), Bérard (1)
10	Cannondale–Drapac	6049	23 riders Urán (1360), Vanmarcke (917), Slagter (589), Woods (585), van Baarle (491), Langeveld (404), Bettiol (312), Talansky (301), (Note: Talansky's points are not attributed to any team according to the UCI.) Formolo (208), Rolland (187), Villella (153), Wippert (152), Van Asbroeck (75), Bevin (73), Brown (56), Carthy (55), S. Clarke (31), Canty (28), Howes (23), Dombrowski (20), Koren (12), Mullen (10), Scully (7)
11	Team Katusha–Alpecin	5619	23 riders Kristoff (1806), Zakarin (1686), Špilak (748), Zabel (326), Restrepo (272), Gonçalves (98), M. Lammertink (96), T. Martin (80), Politt (75), Taaramäe (65), Kochetkov (61), Kišerlovski (58), Planckaert (52), Hollenstein (36), Bystrøm (35), Mamykin (30), Machado (26), Kuznetsov (24), Losada (20), Würtz Schmidt (10), Vicioso (7), Biermans (6), Mørkøv (2)
12	UAE Team Emirates	5494	23 riders Ulissi (1569), Costa (929), Meintjes (758), Modolo (364), Polanc (296), Mohorič (259), Atapuma (180), Conti (174), Stake Laengen (155), Swift (155), Kump (130), Consonni (125), Marcato (88), Ferrari (76), Niemiec (75), Petilli (71), Đurasek (29), Mori (23), Aït El Abdia (10), Ravasi (10), Zurlo (8), Bono (5), Troia (5)
13	Lotto–Soudal	5466	25 riders Wellens (1326), Gallopin (853), Greipel (788), Benoot (541), Valls (313), Marczyński (292), De Gendt (285), Armée (172), Debusschere (154), Monfort (139), J. Vanendert (132), Maes (93), Roelandts (60), Van der Sande (53), De Clercq (48), Wallays (44), Bak (41), De Buyst (25), Vervaeke (24), Sieberg (24), A. Hansen (24), Shaw (15), De Bie (11), Hofland (8), Frison (1)
14	Bahrain–Merida	5277	20 riders V. Nibali (2196), I. Izagirre (1276), Colbrelli (887), Visconti (203), Pellizotti (101), Cink (82), Grmay (80), Bonifazio (78), Brajkovič (75), Bole (73), Gasparotto (67), Pibernik (37), Haussler (28), García (26), Sivtsov (22), Arashiro (21), Božič (16), J. Moreno (4), Insausti (4), Agnoli (1)
15	Astana	5018	28 riders Aru (1214), Fuglsang (776), M. López (520), Lutsenko (409), Valgren (405), J. Hansen (309), L. Sánchez (247), Gatto (190), Bilbao (174), Chernetskiy (161), Breschel (95), Zeits (93), Cataldo (89), Hrivko (86), De Vreese (64), Kangert (49), Scarponi (35), Tleubayev (24), Korsæth (20), Minali (11), Kozhatayev (10), Stalnov (8), Tiralongo (5), Bizhigitov (5), Moser (5), Gruzdev (5), Fominykh (5), Zakharov (4)
16	LottoNL–Jumbo	4846	23 riders Roglič (1191), Groenewegen (678), Kruijswijk (667), G. Bennett (566), Gesink (359), Lobato (225), van Emden (218), Boom (158), Martens (123), Battaglin (103), Clement (98), Bouwman (89), Tankink (73), Tolhoek (63), De Tier (60), Olivier (46), Roosen (38), Van Hoecke (27), Wynants (24), Vermeulen (22), Grøndahl Jansen (12), Van den Broeck (3), Wagner (3)
17	FDJ	3616	20 riders Pinot (1317), Démare (1128), Molard (247), Roux (204), Reichenbach (124), Gaudu (108), Eiking (90), Cimolai (83), Vichot (82), Ladagnous (55), Manzin (40), Konovalovas (37), Morabito (24), Ludvigsson (20), Le Gac (19), Maison (16), Delage (10), Vincent (8), Bonnet (2), Roy (2)
18	Team Dimension Data	2575	22 riders Haas (775), Boasson Hagen (561), Fraile (180), Thwaites (141), Pauwels (127), Morton (115), Sbaragli (113), Kudus (98), Cavendish (88), Debesay (70), Antón (54), J. Janse van Rensburg (54), O'Connor (52), R. Janse van Rensburg (48), Berhane (32), Gibbons (21), King (12), Eisel (10), Cummings (10), Dougall (7), Teklehaimanot (5), Venter (2)

== Leader progress ==
Event (Winner)	Individual	Team
Tour Down Under (Richie Porte)	Richie Porte	BMC Racing Team
Cadel Evans Great Ocean Road Race (Nikias Arndt)	Richie Porte	Orica–Scott
Omloop Het Nieuwsblad (Greg Van Avermaet)	Richie Porte	BMC Racing Team
Abu Dhabi Tour (Rui Costa)	Richie Porte	BMC Racing Team
Strade Bianche (Michał Kwiatkowski)	Richie Porte	BMC Racing Team
Paris–Nice (Sergio Henao)	Richie Porte	BMC Racing Team
Tirreno–Adriatico (Nairo Quintana)	Richie Porte	BMC Racing Team
Milan–San Remo (Michał Kwiatkowski)	Peter Sagan	BMC Racing Team
Dwars door Vlaanderen (Yves Lampaert)	Peter Sagan	Quick-Step Floors
E3 Harelbeke (Greg Van Avermaet)	Greg Van Avermaet	Quick-Step Floors
Volta a Catalunya (Alejandro Valverde)	Greg Van Avermaet	Quick-Step Floors
Gent–Wevelgem (Greg Van Avermaet)	Greg Van Avermaet	Quick-Step Floors
Tour of Flanders (Philippe Gilbert)	Greg Van Avermaet	Quick-Step Floors
Tour of the Basque Country (Alejandro Valverde)	Greg Van Avermaet	Quick-Step Floors
Paris–Roubaix (Greg Van Avermaet)	Greg Van Avermaet	Quick-Step Floors
Amstel Gold Race (Philippe Gilbert)	Greg Van Avermaet	Quick-Step Floors
La Flèche Wallonne (Alejandro Valverde)	Greg Van Avermaet	Quick-Step Floors
Liège–Bastogne–Liège (Alejandro Valverde)	Greg Van Avermaet	Quick-Step Floors
Tour de Romandie (Richie Porte)	Greg Van Avermaet	Quick-Step Floors
Eschborn-Frankfurt – Rund um den Finanzplatz (Alexander Kristoff)	Greg Van Avermaet	Quick-Step Floors
Tour of California (George Bennett)	Greg Van Avermaet	Quick-Step Floors
Giro d'Italia (Tom Dumoulin)	Greg Van Avermaet	Quick-Step Floors
Critérium du Dauphiné (Jakob Fuglsang)	Greg Van Avermaet	Quick-Step Floors
Tour de Suisse (Simon Špilak)	Greg Van Avermaet	Quick-Step Floors
Tour de France (Chris Froome)	Greg Van Avermaet	Quick-Step Floors
Clásica de San Sebastián (Michał Kwiatkowski)	Greg Van Avermaet	Quick-Step Floors
RideLondon–Surrey Classic (Alexander Kristoff)	Greg Van Avermaet	Quick-Step Floors
Tour de Pologne (Dylan Teuns)	Greg Van Avermaet	Quick-Step Floors
BinckBank Tour (Tom Dumoulin)	Greg Van Avermaet	Quick-Step Floors
EuroEyes Cyclassics (Elia Viviani)	Greg Van Avermaet	Quick-Step Floors
Bretagne Classic Ouest–France (Elia Viviani)	Greg Van Avermaet	Quick-Step Floors
Grand Prix Cycliste de Québec (Peter Sagan)	Greg Van Avermaet	Quick-Step Floors
Vuelta a España (Chris Froome)	Chris Froome	Team Sky
Grand Prix Cycliste de Montréal (Diego Ulissi)	Greg Van Avermaet	Team Sky
Il Lombardia (Vincenzo Nibali)	Greg Van Avermaet	Team Sky
Presidential Tour of Turkey (Diego Ulissi)	Greg Van Avermaet	Team Sky
Tour of Guangxi (Tim Wellens)	Greg Van Avermaet	Team Sky
