= 2017 UAE Team Emirates season =

UAE Team Emirates
- 2017 season
- UCI code: UAD
- Status: UCI WorldTeam
- Manager: Giuseppe Saronni
- Main sponsor(s): Emirates
- Based: United Arab Emirates
- Bicycles: Colnago
- Groupset: Shimano

Season victories
- One-day races: 2
- Stage race overall: 1
- Stage race stages: 7
- Jersey

The 2017 season for UAE Team Emirates began in January at the Tour Down Under. As a UCI WorldTeam, they were automatically invited and obligated to send a squad to every event in the UCI World Tour.

== Team roster ==
As of 1 January 2017.

Rider	Date of birth
Anass Aït El Abdia (MAR)	21 March 1993 (aged 23)
Darwin Atapuma (COL)	15 January 1988 (aged 28)
Matteo Bono (ITA)	11 November 1983 (aged 33)
Simone Consonni (ITA)	12 September 1994 (aged 22)
Valerio Conti (ITA)	30 March 1993 (aged 23)
Rui Costa (POR)	5 October 1986 (aged 30)
Kristijan Đurasek (CRO)	26 July 1987 (aged 29)
Roberto Ferrari (ITA)	9 March 1983 (aged 33)
Filippo Ganna (ITA)	25 July 1996 (aged 20)
Andrea Guardini (ITA)	12 June 1989 (aged 27)
Marko Kump (SLO)	9 September 1988 (aged 28)
Vegard Stake Laengen (NOR)	7 February 1989 (aged 27)
Marco Marcato (ITA)	11 February 1984 (aged 32)

Rider	Date of birth
Louis Meintjes (RSA)	21 February 1992 (aged 24)
Yousif Mirza (UAE)	8 October 1988 (aged 28)
Sacha Modolo (ITA)	19 June 1987 (aged 29)
Matej Mohorič (SLO)	19 October 1994 (aged 22)
Manuele Mori (ITA)	9 August 1980 (aged 36)
Przemysław Niemiec (POL)	11 April 1980 (aged 36)
Simone Petilli (ITA)	4 May 1993 (aged 23)
Jan Polanc (SLO)	6 May 1992 (aged 24)
Edward Ravasi (ITA)	5 June 1994 (aged 22)
Ben Swift (GBR)	5 November 1987 (aged 29)
Oliviero Troia (ITA)	1 September 1994 (aged 22)
Diego Ulissi (ITA)	15 July 1989 (aged 27)
Federico Zurlo (ITA)	25 February 1994 (aged 22)

Riders who joined the team for the 2017 season

Rider	2016 team
Anass Aït El Abdia	neo–pro
Darwin Atapuma	BMC Racing Team
Simone Consonni	neo–pro (Team Colpack)
Filippo Ganna	neo–pro (Team Colpack)
Andrea Guardini	Astana
Vegard Stake Laengen	IAM Cycling
Marco Marcato	Wanty–Groupe Gobert
Yousif Mirza	Al Nasr Pro Cycling Team–Dubai
Edward Ravasi	neo–pro (Team Colpack)
Ben Swift	Team Sky
Oliviero Troia	neo–pro (Team Colpack)

Riders who left the team during or after the 2016 season

Rider	2017 team
Yukiya Arashiro	Bahrain–Merida
Mattia Cattaneo	Androni Giocattoli–Sidermec
Davide Cimolai	FDJ
Mário Costa	Retired
Feng Chun-kai	Bahrain–Merida
Tsgabu Grmay	Bahrain–Merida
Ilia Koshevoy	Wilier Triestina–Selle Italia
Luka Pibernik	Bahrain–Merida
Xu Gang	Retired

== Season victories ==
Date	Race	Competition	Rider	Country	Location
27 January	Vuelta a San Juan, Stage 5	UCI America Tour	Rui Costa (POR)	Argentina	Alto Colorado
4 February	Dubai Tour, Teams classification	UCI Asia Tour	(Note: The riders on the squad were Yousif Mirza, Matteo Bono, Simone Consonni, Kristijan Đurasek, Roberto Ferrari, Sacha Modolo, Matej Mohorič and Jan Polanc)	United Arab Emirates	
5 February	Gran Premio della Costa Etruschi	UCI Europe Tour	Diego Ulissi (ITA)	Italy	Donoratico
23 February	Tour La Provence, Mountains classification	UCI Europe Tour	Jan Polanc (SLO)	France	
25 February	Abu Dhabi Tour, Stage 3	UCI World Tour	Rui Costa (POR)	United Arab Emirates	Jebel Hafeet
26 February	Abu Dhabi Tour, Overall	UCI World Tour	Rui Costa (POR)	United Arab Emirates	
26 February	Abu Dhabi Tour, Teams classification	UCI World Tour	(Note: The riders on the squad were Andrea Guardini, Simone Consonni, Kristijan Đurasek, Rui Costa, Louis Meintjes, Manuele Mori, Ben Swift and Diego Ulissi)	United Arab Emirates	
30 March	Three Days of De Panne, Youth classification	UCI Europe Tour	Simone Consonni (ITA)	Belgium	
18 April	Tour of Croatia, Stage 1	UCI Europe Tour	Sacha Modolo (ITA)	Croatia	Koprivnica
19 April	Tour of Croatia, Stage 2	UCI Europe Tour	Kristijan Đurasek (CRO)	Croatia	Biokovo (Sveti Jure)
23 April	Tour of Croatia, Stage 6	UCI Europe Tour	Sacha Modolo (ITA)	Croatia	Zagreb
9 May	Giro d'Italia, Stage 4	UCI World Tour	Jan Polanc (SLO)	Italy	Etna
8 June	Grand Prix of Aargau Canton	UCI Europe Tour	Sacha Modolo (ITA)	Switzerland	Leuggern
30 July	Tour de Pologne, Stage 2	UCI World Tour	Sacha Modolo (ITA)	Poland	Katowice

== National, Continental and World champions 2017 ==
Date	Race	Jersey	Rider	Country	Location
1 April	UAE National Time Trial Champion		Yousif Mirza (UAE)	United Arab Emirates	
9 April	UAE National Road Race Champion		Yousif Mirza (UAE)	United Arab Emirates	
