= 2017 Cannondale–Drapac season =

Cannondale–Drapac
- 2017 season
- UCI code: CPT
- Status: UCI WorldTeam
- Manager: Jonathan Vaughters
- Main sponsor(s): Cannondale
- Based: Boulder, Colorado, United States
- Bicycles: Cannondale
- Groupset: Shimano

Season victories
- One-day races: 0
- Stage race overall: 0
- Stage race stages: 8
- National Championships: 2
- Jersey

The 2017 season for the Cannondale–Drapac cycling team began in January at the Tour Down Under. As a UCI WorldTeam, they are obligated to send a squad to every event in the UCI World Tour.

== Team roster ==
As of 1 January 2017.

Rider	Date of birth
Alberto Bettiol (ITA)	October 23, 1993 (aged 23)
Patrick Bevin (NZL)	May 1, 1991 (aged 25)
Nate Brown (USA)	July 6, 1991 (aged 25)
Brendan Canty (AUS)	August 17, 1992 (aged 24)
Hugh Carthy (GBR)	July 9, 1994 (aged 22)
Simon Clarke (AUS)	July 18, 1986 (aged 30)
Will Clarke (AUS)	April 11, 1985 (aged 31)
Lawson Craddock (USA)	February 20, 1992 (aged 24)
Joe Dombrowski (USA)	May 12, 1991 (aged 25)
Davide Formolo (ITA)	October 25, 1992 (aged 24)
Alex Howes (USA)	January 1, 1988 (aged 29)
Kristijan Koren (SLO)	November 25, 1986 (aged 30)
Sebastian Langeveld (NED)	January 17, 1985 (aged 31)
Ryan Mullen (IRL)	August 7, 1994 (aged 22)

Rider	Date of birth
Taylor Phinney (USA)	June 27, 1990 (aged 26)
Pierre Rolland (FRA)	October 10, 1986 (aged 30)
Tom Scully (NZL)	January 14, 1990 (aged 26)
Toms Skujiņš (LAT)	June 15, 1991 (aged 25)
Tom-Jelte Slagter (NED)	July 1, 1989 (aged 27)
Andrew Talansky (USA)	November 23, 1988 (aged 28)
Rigoberto Urán (COL)	January 26, 1987 (aged 29)
Tom Van Asbroeck (BEL)	April 19, 1990 (aged 26)
Dylan van Baarle (NED)	May 22, 1993 (aged 23)
Sep Vanmarcke (BEL)	July 27, 1988 (aged 28)
Davide Villella (ITA)	June 27, 1991 (aged 25)
Wouter Wippert (NED)	August 14, 1990 (aged 26)
Michael Woods (CAN)	October 12, 1986 (aged 30)

Riders who joined the team for the 2017 season

Rider	2016 team
Brendan Canty	Drapac Professional Cycling
Hugh Carthy	Caja Rural–Seguros RGA
Will Clarke	Drapac Professional Cycling
Taylor Phinney	BMC Racing Team
Tom Scully	Drapac Professional Cycling
Tom Van Asbroeck	LottoNL–Jumbo
Sep Vanmarcke	LottoNL–Jumbo

Riders who left the team during or after the 2016 season

Rider	2017 team
Jack Bauer	Quick-Step Floors
Matti Breschel	Astana
André Cardoso	Trek–Segafredo
Phil Gaimon	Retired
Ben King	Team Dimension Data
Alan Marangoni	Nippo–Vini Fantini
Moreno Moser	Astana
Ramūnas Navardauskas	Bahrain–Merida
Kristoffer Skjerping	Joker Icopal
Ruben Zepuntke	Development Team Sunweb

== Season victories ==
Date	Race	Competition	Rider	Country	Location
24 March	Settimana Internazionale di Coppi e Bartali, Stage 2	UCI Europe Tour	Toms Skujiņš (LAT)	Italy	Sogliano al Rubicone
26 March	Volta a Catalunya, Sprints classification	UCI World Tour	Pierre Rolland (FRA)	Spain	
8 April	Tour of the Basque Country, Mountains classification	UCI World Tour	Alex Howes (USA)	Spain	
18 May	Tour of California, Stage 5	UCI World Tour	Andrew Talansky (USA)	United States	Mount Baldy
24 May	Giro d'Italia, Stage 17	UCI World Tour	Pierre Rolland (FRA)	Italy	Canazei
17 June	Route du Sud, Stage 3	UCI Europe Tour	Pierre Rolland (FRA)	France	Gavarnie-Gèdre
18 June	Route du Sud, Stage 4	UCI Europe Tour	Tom Scully (NZL)	France	Nogaro
4 July	Tour of Austria, Stage 2	UCI Europe Tour	Tom-Jelte Slagter (NED)	Austria	Pöggstall
8 July	Tour of Austria, Points classification	UCI Europe Tour	Sep Vanmarcke (BEL)	Austria	
9 July	Tour de France, Stage 9	UCI World Tour	Rigoberto Urán (COL)	France	Chambéry
11 August	Colorado Classic, Stage 2	UCI America Tour	Alex Howes (USA)	United States	Breckenridge
13 August	Colorado Classic, Teams classification	UCI America Tour	(Note: The riders on the squad were Hugh Carthy, William Clarke, Lawson Craddock, Alex Howes, Taylor Phinney, and Rigoberto Urán)	United States	

== National, Continental and World champions ==
Date	Discipline	Jersey	Rider	Country	Location
22 June	Irish National Time Trial Championships		Ryan Mullen (IRL)	Ireland	Wexford
25 June	Irish National Road Race Championships		Ryan Mullen (IRL)	Ireland	Wexford
