= 2017 AG2R La Mondiale season =

AG2R La Mondiale
- 2017 season
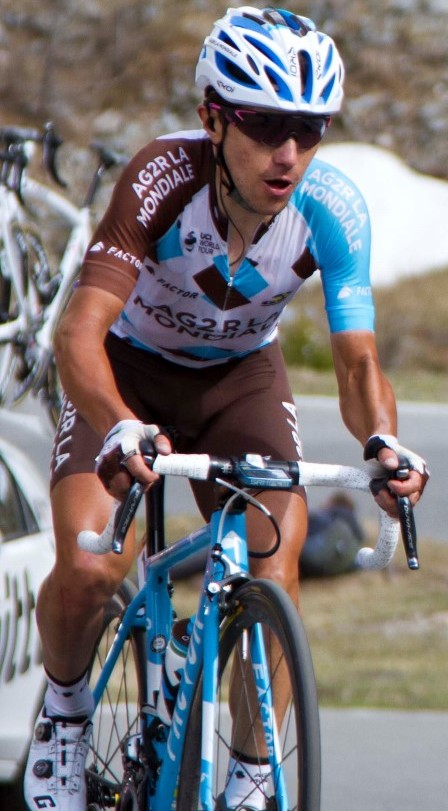
- Domenico Pozzovivo on 2017 Giro d' Italia
- UCI code: ALM
- Status: UCI WorldTeam
- Manager: Vincent Lavenu
- Main sponsor(s): AG2R Group & La Mondiale Group
- Based: France
- Bicycles: Focus Bikes
- Groupset: SRAM

Season victories
- One-day races: 2
- Stage race overall: 1
- Stage race stages: 8
- National Championships: 2

The 2017 season for the AG2R La Mondiale cycling team began in January at the Tour Down Under. As a UCI WorldTeam, they were automatically invited and obligated to send a squad to every event in the UCI World Tour.

== Team roster ==
As of 1 January 2017.

Rider	Date of birth
Gediminas Bagdonas (LTU)	26 December 1985 (aged 31)
Jan Bakelants (BEL)	14 February 1986 (aged 30)
Rudy Barbier (FRA)	18 December 1992 (aged 24)
Romain Bardet (FRA)	9 November 1990 (aged 26)
Julien Bérard (FRA)	2 July 1987 (aged 29)
François Bidard (FRA)	12 March 1992 (aged 24)
Mikaël Cherel (FRA)	17 March 1986 (aged 30)
Clément Chevrier (FRA)	29 June 1992 (aged 24)
Benoît Cosnefroy (Note: Cosnefroy will join the team on 1 August as a stagiaire, from Chambéry CF.) (FRA)	17 October 1995 (aged 21)
Nico Denz (GER)	15 February 1994 (aged 22)
Axel Domont (FRA)	7 August 1990 (aged 26)
Samuel Dumoulin (FRA)	20 August 1980 (aged 36)
Hubert Dupont (FRA)	13 November 1980 (aged 36)
Julien Duval (FRA)	27 May 1990 (aged 26)
Sondre Holst Enger (NOR)	17 December 1993 (aged 23)

Rider	Date of birth
Mathias Frank (SUI)	9 December 1986 (aged 30)
Ben Gastauer (LUX)	14 November 1987 (aged 29)
Cyril Gautier (FRA)	26 September 1987 (aged 29)
Alexandre Geniez (FRA)	16 April 1988 (aged 28)
Alexis Gougeard (FRA)	5 March 1993 (aged 23)
Hugo Houle (CAN)	27 September 1990 (aged 26)
Quentin Jaurégui (FRA)	22 April 1994 (aged 22)
Pierre Latour (FRA)	12 October 1993 (aged 23)
Matteo Montaguti (ITA)	6 January 1984 (aged 32)
Oliver Naesen (BEL)	16 September 1990 (aged 26)
Nans Peters (FRA)	12 March 1994 (aged 22)
Domenico Pozzovivo (ITA)	30 November 1982 (aged 34)
Christophe Riblon (FRA)	17 January 1981 (aged 35)
Stijn Vandenbergh (BEL)	25 April 1984 (aged 32)
Alexis Vuillermoz (FRA)	1 June 1988 (aged 28)

Riders who joined the team for the 2017 season

Rider	2016 team
Rudy Barbier	Roubaix–Métropole Européenne de Lille
Clément Chevrier	IAM Cycling
Julien Duval	Armée de Terre
Sondre Holst Enger	IAM Cycling
Mathias Frank	IAM Cycling
Alexandre Geniez	FDJ
Oliver Naesen	IAM Cycling
Nans Peters	neo-pro (Chambéry CF)
Stijn Vandenbergh	Etixx–Quick-Step

Riders who left the team during or after the 2016 season

Rider	2017 team
Guillaume Bonnafond	Cofidis
Maxime Daniel	Fortuneo–Vital Concept
Damien Gaudin	Armée de Terre
Patrick Gretsch	Retired
Blel Kadri	
Sébastien Minard	Retired
Jean-Christophe Péraud	Retired
Jesse Sergent	Retired
Sébastien Turgot	l'US Saint-Herblain
Johan Vansummeren	Retired

== Season victories ==
Date	Race	Competition	Rider	Country	Location
5 February	Étoile de Bessèges, Mountains classification	UCI Europe Tour	Nico Denz (GER)	France	
5 February	Volta a la Comunitat Valenciana, Mountains classification	UCI Europe Tour	Cyril Gautier (FRA)	Spain	
5 February	Volta a la Comunitat Valenciana, Sprints classification	UCI Europe Tour	Cyril Gautier (FRA)	Spain	
18 February	Tour du Haut Var, Stage 1	UCI Europe Tour	Samuel Dumoulin (FRA)	France	Saint-Paul-en-Forêt
22 February	Tour La Provence, Stage 2	UCI Europe Tour	Alexandre Geniez (FRA)	France	La Ciotat
20 April	Tour of the Alps, Stage 4	UCI Europe Tour	Matteo Montaguti (ITA)	Italy	Cles
30 April	Tour de Romandie, Youth classification	UCI World Tour	Pierre Latour (FRA)	Switzerland	
14 May	Four Days of Dunkirk, Teams classification	UCI Europe Tour	(Note: The riders on the squad were Samuel Dumoulin, Gediminas Bagdonas, Rudy Barbier, Julien Duval, Alexis Gougeard, Oliver Naesen, Christophe Riblon and Stijn Vandenbergh)	France	
27 May	Grand Prix de Plumelec-Morbihan	UCI Europe Tour	Alexis Vuillermoz (FRA)	France	Plumelec
11 June	Critérium du Dauphiné, Teams classification	UCI World Tour	(Note: The riders on the squad were Romain Bardet, Axel Domont, Samuel Dumoulin, Julien Duval, Cyril Gautier, Pierre Latour, Oliver Naesen and Alexis Vuillermoz)	France	
15 June	Tour de Suisse, Stage 6	UCI World Tour	Domenico Pozzovivo (ITA)	Switzerland	La Punt
18 June	Tour de Suisse, Teams classification	UCI World Tour	(Note: The riders on the squad were Mathias Frank, Jan Bakelants, Gediminas Bagdonas, Alexis Gougeard, Sondre Holst Enger, Hugo Houle, Nico Denz and Domenico Pozzovivo)	Switzerland	
13 July	Tour de France, Stage 12	UCI World Tour	Romain Bardet (FRA)	France	Peyragudes
26 July	Tour de Wallonie, Mountains classification	UCI Europe Tour	Alexis Gougeard (FRA)	Belgium	
30 July	Polynormande	UCI Europe Tour	Alexis Gougeard (FRA)	France	Saint-Martin-de-Landelles
12 August	Tour de l'Ain, Stage 4	UCI Europe Tour	Alexandre Geniez (FRA)	France	Culoz
12 August	Tour de l'Ain, Points classification	UCI Europe Tour	Alexandre Geniez (FRA)	France	
16 August	Tour du Limousin, Stage 2	UCI Europe Tour	Alexis Vuillermoz (FRA)	France	Monts de Guéret
17 August	Tour du Limousin, Stage 3	UCI Europe Tour	Cyril Gautier (FRA)	France	Chaumeil
18 August	Tour du Limousin, Overall	UCI Europe Tour	Alexis Vuillermoz (FRA)	France	
18 August	Tour du Limousin, Teams classification	UCI Europe Tour	(Note: The riders on the squad were Julien Bérard, François Bidard, Benoît Cosnefroy, Hubert Dupont, Cyril Gautier, Sondre Holst Enger, Christophe Riblon and Alexis Vuillermoz)	France	

== National, Continental and World champions 2017 ==
Date	Discipline	Jersey	Rider	Country	Location
22 June	French National Time Trial Champion		Pierre Latour (FRA)	France	Saint-Omer
25 June	Belgian National Road Race Champion		Oliver Naesen (BEL)	Belgium	Antwerp
