= 2017 Dimension Data season =

Dimension Data
- 2017 season
- UCI code: DDD
- Status: UCI WorldTeam
- Manager: Brian Smith
- Main sponsor(s): Dimension Data
- Based: South Africa
- Bicycles: Cervélo

Season victories
- One-day races: 0
- Stage race overall: 4
- Stage race stages: 12
- National Championships: 6

The 2017 season for the Team Dimension Data cycling team began in January at the Tour Down Under. As a UCI WorldTeam, they were automatically invited and obligated to send a squad to every event in the UCI World Tour.

== Team roster ==
As of 1 January 2017

Rider	Date of birth
Igor Anton (ESP)	2 March 1983 (aged 33)
Natnael Berhane (ERI)	5 January 1991 (aged 25)
Edvald Boasson Hagen (NOR)	17 May 1987 (aged 29)
Mark Cavendish (GBR)	21 May 1985 (aged 31)
Steve Cummings (GBR)	19 March 1981 (aged 35)
Mekseb Debesay (ERI)	16 June 1991 (aged 25)
Nicolas Dougall (RSA)	21 November 1992 (aged 24)
Bernhard Eisel (AUT)	17 February 1981 (aged 35)
Tyler Farrar (USA)	2 June 1984 (aged 32)
Omar Fraile (ESP)	17 July 1990 (aged 26)
Ryan Gibbons (RSA)	13 August 1994 (aged 22)
Nathan Haas (AUS)	12 March 1989 (aged 27)
Jacques Janse van Rensburg (RSA)	6 September 1987 (aged 29)
Reinardt Janse van Rensburg (RSA)	3 February 1989 (aged 27)

Rider	Date of birth
Ben King (USA)	22 March 1989 (aged 27)
Merhawi Kudus (ERI)	23 January 1994 (aged 22)
Lachlan Morton (AUS)	2 January 1992 (aged 24)
Adrien Niyonshuti (RWA)	2 February 1987 (aged 29)
Ben O'Connor (AUS)	25 November 1995 (aged 21)
Serge Pauwels (BEL)	21 November 1983 (aged 33)
Youcef Reguigui (ALG)	9 January 1990 (aged 26)
Mark Renshaw (AUS)	22 October 1982 (aged 34)
Kristian Sbaragli (ITA)	8 May 1990 (aged 26)
Daniel Teklehaymanot (ERI)	10 November 1988 (aged 28)
Jay Thomson (RSA)	12 April 1986 (aged 30)
Scott Thwaites (GBR)	12 February 1990 (aged 26)
Johann Van Zyl (RSA)	2 February 1991 (aged 25)
Jaco Venter (RSA)	13 February 1987 (aged 29)

Riders who joined the team for the 2017 season

Rider	2016 team
Ryan Gibbons	Dimension Data for Qhubeka
Ben King	Cannondale–Drapac
Lachlan Morton	Jelly Belly–Maxxis
Ben O'Connor	Avanti IsoWhey Sports
Scott Thwaites	Bora–Argon 18

Riders who left the team during or after the 2016 season

Rider	2017 team
Theo Bos	
Matt Brammeier	Aqua Blue Sport
Songezo Jim	Kuwait–Cartucho.es
Cameron Meyer	
Kanstantsin Sivtsov	Bahrain–Merida

== Season victories ==
Date	Race	Competition	Rider	Country	Location
19 February	Tour of Oman, Youth classification	UCI Asia Tour	Merhawi Kudus (ERI)	Oman	
19 February	Tour of Oman, Teams classification	UCI Asia Tour	(Note: The riders on the squad were Merhawi Kudus, Mekseb Debesay, Tyler Farrar, Nathan Haas, Lachlan Morton, Youcef Reguigui, Kristian Sbaragli and Jay Thomson)	Oman	
23 February	Abu Dhabi Tour, Stage 1	UCI World Tour	Mark Cavendish (GBR)	United Arab Emirates	Madinat Zayed
24 February	Tour de Langkawi, Stage 3	UCI Asia Tour	Mekseb Debesay (ERI)	Malaysia	Cameron Highlands
25 February	Tour de Langkawi, Stage 4	UCI Asia Tour	Ryan Gibbons (RSA)	Malaysia	Kuala Kubu Bharu
26 February	Abu Dhabi Tour, Points classification	UCI World Tour	Mark Cavendish (GBR)	United Arab Emirates	
1 March	Tour de Langkawi, Overall	UCI Asia Tour	Ryan Gibbons (RSA)	Malaysia	
1 March	Tour de Langkawi, Points classification	UCI Asia Tour	Ryan Gibbons (RSA)	Malaysia	
30 April	Tour de Yorkshire, Stage 3	UCI Europe Tour	Serge Pauwels (BEL)	United Kingdom	Sheffield
30 April	Tour de Yorkshire, Overall	UCI Europe Tour	Serge Pauwels (BEL)	United Kingdom	
30 April	Tour de Yorkshire, Teams classification	UCI Europe Tour	(Note: The riders on the squad were Serge Pauwels, Bernhard Eisel, Omar Fraile, Jacques Janse van Rensburg, Ben O'Connor, Kristian Sbaragli, Scott Thwaites and Johann van Zyl)	United Kingdom	
17 May	Giro d'Italia, Stage 11	UCI World Tour	Omar Fraile (ESP)	Italy	Bagno di Romagna
17 May	Tour of Norway, Stage 1	UCI Europe Tour	Edvald Boasson Hagen (NOR)	Norway	Asker
20 May	Tour of California, Youth classification	UCI World Tour	Lachlan Morton (AUS)	United States	
21 May	Tour of Norway, Stage 5	UCI Europe Tour	Edvald Boasson Hagen (NOR)	Norway	Oslo
21 May	Tour of Norway, Overall	UCI Europe Tour	Edvald Boasson Hagen (NOR)	Norway	
21 May	Tour of Norway, Points classification	UCI Europe Tour	Edvald Boasson Hagen (NOR)	Norway	
26 May	Tour des Fjords, Stage 3	UCI Europe Tour	Edvald Boasson Hagen (NOR)	Norway	Kopervik
27 May	Tour des Fjords, Stage 4	UCI Europe Tour	Edvald Boasson Hagen (NOR)	Norway	Sandnes
28 May	Tour des Fjords, Stage 5	UCI Europe Tour	Edvald Boasson Hagen (NOR)	Norway	Stavanger
28 May	Tour des Fjords, Overall	UCI Europe Tour	Edvald Boasson Hagen (NOR)	Norway	
28 May	Tour des Fjords, Points classification	UCI Europe Tour	Edvald Boasson Hagen (NOR)	Norway	
7 July	Tour of Austria, Stage 5	UCI Europe Tour	Ben O'Connor (AUS)	Austria	Alpendorf
8 July	Tour of Austria, Team classification	UCI Europe Tour	(Note: The riders on the squad were Igor Antón, Mekseb Debesay, Ryan Gibbons, Ben O'Connor, Youcef Reguigui, Daniel Teklehaimanot, Jay Thomson and Johann van Zyl)	Austria	
21 July	Tour de France, Stage 19	UCI World Tour	Edvald Boasson Hagen (NOR)	France	Salon-de-Provence
13 August	Arctic Race of Norway, Mountains classification	UCI Europe Tour	Bernhard Eisel (AUT)	Norway	

== National, Continental and World champions 2017 ==
Date	Discipline	Jersey	Rider	Country	Location
12 February	South African National Road Race Champion		Reinardt Janse van Rensburg (RSA)	South Africa	Wellington
22 June	Norwegian National Time Trial Champion		Edvald Boasson Hagen (NOR)	Norway	Trondheim
22 June	British National Time Trial Champion		Steve Cummings (GBR)	Isle of Man	St John's
23 June	Eritrean National Time Trial Champion		Mekseb Debesay (ERI)	Eritrea	
24 June	Rwanda National Time Trial Champion		Adrien Niyonshuti (RWA)	Rwanda	Bugesera
25 June	British National Road Race Champion		Steve Cummings (GBR)	Isle of Man	Douglas
