= 2017 Bretagne Classic Ouest-France =

2017 Bretagne Classic Ouest–France
2017 UCI World Tour, race 32 of 37

Race details
- Dates: 27 August 2017
- Stages: 1
- Winning time: 5h 51' 39"

Results
	Winner	Elia Viviani (ITA)	(Team Sky)
	Second	Alexander Kristoff (NOR)	(Team Katusha–Alpecin)
	Third	Sonny Colbrelli (ITA)	(Bahrain–Merida)

The 2017 Bretagne Classic Ouest–France was a road cycling one-day race that took place on 27 August. It was the 81st edition of the former GP Ouest–France race now known as the Bretagne Classic; it was also the 32nd event of the 2017 UCI World Tour. It was won by Elia Viviani in the sprint.

== Result ==
Result
Rank	Rider	Team	Time
1	Elia Viviani (ITA)	Team Sky	5h 51' 39"
2	Alexander Kristoff (NOR)	Team Katusha–Alpecin	+ 0"
3	Sonny Colbrelli (ITA)	Bahrain–Merida	+ 0"
4	Sep Vanmarcke (BEL)	Cannondale–Drapac	+ 0"
5	Michael Matthews (AUS)	Team Sunweb	+ 0"
6	Ruben Guerreiro (POR)	Trek–Segafredo	+ 0"
7	Edvald Boasson Hagen (NOR)	Team Dimension Data	+ 0"
8	Nacer Bouhanni (FRA)	Cofidis	+ 0"
9	Simone Consonni (ITA)	UAE Team Emirates	+ 0"
10	Greg Van Avermaet (BEL)	BMC Racing Team	+ 0"
