= 2017 Astana season =

Astana
- 2017 season
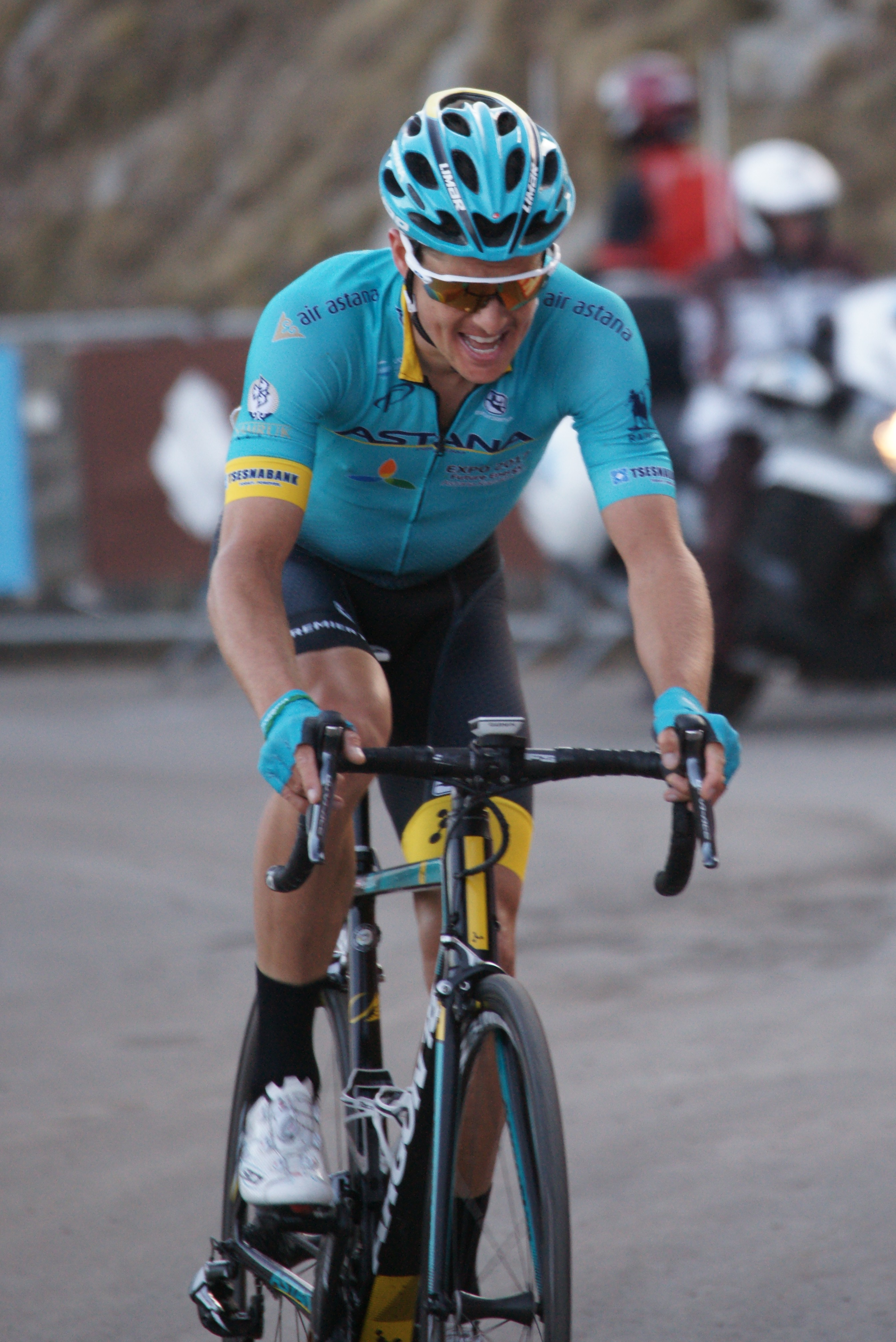
- Jakob Fuglsang in Paris-Nice
- UCI code: AST
- Status: UCI WorldTeam
- World Tour Rank: 15th
- Manager: Alexander Vinokourov
- Main sponsor(s): Samruk-Kazyna
- Based: Kazakhstan
- Bicycles: Argon 18

Season victories
- Stage race overall: 1
- Stage race stages: 6
- National Championships: 3
- Best ranked rider: Fabio Aru
- Jersey

The 2017 season for the Astana cycling team began in January with the Tour Down Under. As a UCI WorldTeam, they were automatically invited and obligated to send a squad to every event in the UCI World Tour.

== Team roster ==
As of 1 January 2017

Rider	Date of birth
Fabio Aru (ITA)	3 July 1990 (aged 27)
Pello Bilbao (ESP)	25 February 1990 (aged 27)
Zhandos Bizhigitov (KAZ)	10 June 1991 (aged 26)
Matti Breschel (DEN)	31 August 1984 (aged 32)
Dario Cataldo (ITA)	17 March 1985 (aged 31)
Sergey Chernetskiy (RUS)	9 April 1990 (aged 26)
Laurens de Vreese (BEL)	29 September 1988 (aged 28)
Daniil Fominykh (KAZ)	28 August 1991 (aged 25)
Jakob Fuglsang (DEN)	22 March 1985 (aged 31)
Oscar Gatto (ITA)	1 January 1985 (aged 32)
Yevgeniy Gidich (KAZ)	19 May 1996 (aged 20)
Andriy Grivko (UKR)	7 August 1983 (aged 33)
Dmitriy Gruzdev (KAZ)	13 March 1986 (aged 30)
Jesper Hansen (DEN)	23 October 1990 (aged 26)
Arman Kamyshev (KAZ)	14 March 1991 (aged 25)
Tanel Kangert (EST)	11 March 1987 (aged 29)

Rider	Date of birth
Truls Engen Korsæth (NOR)	16 September 1993 (aged 23)
Bakhtiyar Kozhatayev (KAZ)	28 March 1992 (aged 24)
Miguel Ángel López (COL)	4 February 1994 (aged 22)
Alexey Lutsenko (KAZ)	7 September 1992 (aged 24)
Riccardo Minali (ITA)	19 April 1995 (aged 21)
Moreno Moser (ITA)	25 December 1990 (aged 26)
Luis León Sánchez (ESP)	24 November 1983 (aged 33)
Michele Scarponi (Note: Scarponi died on 22 April as a result of a crash during a training ride.) (ITA)	25 September 1979 (aged 37)
Nikita Stalnov (KAZ)	14 September 1991 (aged 25)
Paolo Tiralongo (ITA)	8 July 1977 (aged 39)
Ruslan Tleubayev (KAZ)	7 March 1987 (aged 29)
Michael Valgren (DEN)	7 February 1992 (aged 24)
Artyom Zakharov (KAZ)	27 October 1991 (aged 25)
Andrey Zeits (KAZ)	14 December 1986 (aged 30)

Riders who joined the team for the 2017 season

Rider	2016 team
Pello Bilbao	Caja Rural–Seguros RGA
Zhandos Bizhigitov	neo-pro (Vino 4ever SKO)
Matti Breschel	Tinkoff
Sergey Chernetskiy	Team Katusha
Oscar Gatto	Tinkoff
Jesper Hansen	Tinkoff
Truls Engen Korsæth	neo-pro Team Joker Byggtorget
Riccardo Minali	neo-pro Team Colpack
Moreno Moser	Cannondale–Drapac
Nikita Stalnov	neo-pro Astana City
Michael Valgren	Tinkoff

Riders who left the team during or after the 2016 season

Rider	2017 team
Valerio Agnoli	Bahrain–Merida
Maxat Ayazbayev	
Lars Boom	LottoNL–Jumbo
Eros Capecchi	Quick-Step Floors
Andrea Guardini	UAE Abu Dhabi
Davide Malacarne	
Vincenzo Nibali	Bahrain–Merida
Diego Rosa	Team Sky
Gatis Smukulis	Delko–Marseille Provence KTM
Lieuwe Westra	Wanty–Groupe Gobert

== Season victories ==
Date	Race	Competition	Rider	Country	Location
19 February	Volta ao Algarve, Teams classification	UCI Europe Tour	(Note: The riders on the squad were Pello Bilbao, Dario Cataldo, Sergey Chernetskiy, Oscar Gatto, Jesper Hansen, Moreno Moser, Luis León Sánchez and Michele Scarponi)	Portugal	
17 April	Tour of the Alps, Stage 1	UCI Europe Tour	Michele Scarponi (ITA)	Austria	Innsbruck–Hungerburg
9 June	Critérium du Dauphiné, Stage 6	UCI World Tour	Jakob Fuglsang (DEN)	France	La Motte-Servolex
11 June	Critérium du Dauphiné, Stage 8	UCI World Tour	Jakob Fuglsang (DEN)	France	Plateau de Solaison
11 June	Critérium du Dauphiné, Overall	UCI World Tour	Jakob Fuglsang (DEN)	France	
2 July	Tour of Austria, Prologue	UCI Europe Tour	Oscar Gatto (ITA)	Austria	Schloßberg (Graz)
5 July	Tour de France, Stage 5	UCI World Tour	Fabio Aru (ITA)	France	La Planche des Belles Filles
6 July	Tour of Austria, Stage 4	UCI Europe Tour	Miguel Ángel López (COL)	Austria	Kitzbüheler Horn
5 August	Vuelta a Burgos, Stage 5	UCI Europe Tour	Miguel Ángel López (COL)	Spain	Lagunas de Neila
5 August	Vuelta a Burgos, Teams classification	UCI Europe Tour	(Note: The riders on the squad were Miguel Ángel López, Pello Bilbao, Zhandos Bizhigitov, Sergey Chernetskiy, Nikita Stalnov, Artyom Zakharov, Jesper Hansen and Paolo Tiralongo)	Spain	

== National, Continental and World champions 2017 ==
Date	Discipline	Jersey	Rider	Country	Location
21 June	Kazakhstan National Time Trial Champion		Zhandos Bizhigitov (KAZ)	Kazakhstan	Almaty
25 June	Italian National Time Trial Champion		Fabio Aru (ITA)	Italy	Ivrea
25 June	Kazakhstan National Time Trial Champion		Artyom Zakharov (KAZ)	Kazakhstan	Almaty
