= 2017 Amstel Gold Race =

Cycling race

2017 UCI World Tour, race 16 of 37

Race details
- Dates: 16 April 2017
- Stages: 1
- Distance: 264.6 km (164.4 mi)
- Winning time: 6h 31' 40"

Results
	Winner	Philippe Gilbert (BEL)	(Quick-Step Floors)
	Second	Michał Kwiatkowski (POL)	(Team Sky)
	Third	Michael Albasini (SUI)	(Orica–Scott)

The 2017 Amstel Gold Race was a road cycling one-day race that took place on 16 April. It was the 52nd edition of the Amstel Gold Race and the sixteenth event of the 2017 UCI World Tour.

It was won for the fourth time by Philippe Gilbert (Quick-Step Floors), defeating Team Sky's Michał Kwiatkowski in a two-up sprint finish. Michael Albasini from Orica–Scott completed the podium, leading home a small group ten seconds in arrears of the lead duo. Gilbert's win, coupled with a win two weeks earlier at the Tour of Flanders, made him the third rider to win both races in the same year – after Eddy Merckx and Jan Raas.

After a 14-year hiatus, there was also a women's version of the Amstel Gold Race of 121 km, following the same parcours. This race was won by Anna van der Breggen.

== Teams ==
As the Amstel Gold Race was a UCI World Tour event, all eighteen UCI WorldTeams were invited automatically and obliged to enter a team in the race. Six UCI Professional Continental teams competed, completing the 24-team peloton.

UCI WorldTeams

- AG2R La Mondiale
- Astana
- Bahrain–Merida
- BMC Racing Team
- Bora–Hansgrohe
- Cannondale–Drapac
- Team Dimension Data
- FDJ
- Team Katusha–Alpecin
- LottoNL–Jumbo
- Lotto–Soudal
- Movistar Team
- Orica–Scott
- Quick-Step Floors
- Team Sky
- Team Sunweb
- Trek–Segafredo
- UAE Team Emirates

UCI Professional Continental teams

- Bardiani–CSF
- CCC–Sprandi–Polkowice
- Direct Énergie
- Roompot–Nederlandse Loterij
- Sport Vlaanderen–Baloise
- Wanty–Groupe Gobert

== Result ==
Results men's race
Rank	Rider	Team	Time
1	Philippe Gilbert (BEL)	Quick-Step Floors	6h 31' 40"
2	Michał Kwiatkowski (POL)	Team Sky	+ 0"
3	Michael Albasini (SUI)	Orica–Scott	+ 10"
4	Nathan Haas (AUS)	Team Dimension Data	+ 10"
5	José Joaquín Rojas (ESP)	Movistar Team	+ 10"
6	Sergio Henao (COL)	Team Sky	+ 10"
7	Ion Izagirre (ESP)	Bahrain–Merida	+ 14"
8	Michael Gogl (AUT)	Trek–Segafredo	+ 1' 10"
9	Sonny Colbrelli (ITA)	Bahrain–Merida	+ 1' 11"
10	Michael Matthews (AUS)	Team Sunweb	+ 1' 11"

Results women's race
Rank	Rider	Team	Time
1	Anna Van Der Breggen (NED)	Boels Dolmans Cyclingteam	3h 15' 57"
2	Elizabeth Deignan (GBR)	Boels Dolmans Cyclingteam	+ 55"
3	Katarzyna Niewiadoma (POL)	WM3 Pro Cycling	+ 55"
4	Annemiek van Vleuten (NED)	Orica Scott Women	+ 55"
5	Elisa Longo Borghini (ITA)	Wiggle High5	+ 55"
6	Coryn Rivera (USA)	Team Sunweb Women	+ 1' 02"
7	Amy Pieters (NED)	Boels Dolmans Cyclingteam	+ 1' 51"
8	Pauline Ferrand-Prévot (FRA)	Canyon SRAM Racing	+ 1' 51"
9	Ashleigh Moolman-Pasio (RSA)	Cervelo Bigla Pro Cycling Team	+ 1' 51"
10	Ellen Van Dijk (NED)	Team Sunweb Women	+ 1' 51"
