= 2017 Team LottoNL–Jumbo season =

Team LottoNL–Jumbo
- 2017 season
- Status: UCI WorldTeam
- Manager: Richard Plugge
- Main sponsor(s): Jumbo & Staatsloterij
- Based: Netherlands
- Bicycles: Bianchi
- Groupset: Shimano

Season victories
- One-day races: 2
- Stage race overall: 3
- Stage race stages: 18
- Most wins: Dylan Groenewegen
- Best ranked rider: Primož Roglič
- Jersey

The 2017 season for the LottoNL–Jumbo road cycling team began in January at the Tour Down Under. As a UCI WorldTeam, they were automatically invited and obligated to send a squad to every event in the UCI World Tour.

== Team roster ==
As of 1 January 2017.

Rider	Date of birth
Enrico Battaglin (ITA)	17 November 1989 (aged 27)
George Bennett (NZL)	7 April 1990 (aged 26)
Lars Boom (NED)	30 December 1985 (aged 31)
Koen Bouwman (NED)	2 December 1993 (aged 23)
Victor Campenaerts (BEL)	28 October 1991 (aged 25)
Twan Castelijns (NED)	23 January 1989 (aged 27)
Stef Clement (NED)	24 September 1982 (aged 34)
Floris De Tier (BEL)	20 January 1992 (aged 24)
Robert Gesink (NED)	31 May 1986 (aged 30)
Dylan Groenewegen (NED)	21 June 1993 (aged 23)
Amund Grøndahl Jansen (NOR)	11 February 1994 (aged 22)
Martijn Keizer (NED)	25 March 1988 (aged 28)
Steven Kruijswijk (NED)	7 June 1987 (aged 29)
Steven Lammertink (NED)	4 December 1993 (aged 23)
Tom Leezer (NED)	26 December 1985 (aged 31)

Rider	Date of birth
Bert-Jan Lindeman (NED)	16 June 1989 (aged 27)
Juan José Lobato (ESP)	30 December 1988 (aged 28)
Paul Martens (GER)	26 October 1983 (aged 33)
Daan Olivier (NED)	24 November 1992 (aged 24)
Primož Roglič (SLO)	29 October 1989 (aged 27)
Timo Roosen (NED)	11 January 1993 (aged 23)
Bram Tankink (NED)	3 December 1978 (aged 38)
Antwan Tolhoek (NED)	29 April 1994 (aged 22)
Jurgen Van den Broeck (BEL)	1 February 1983 (aged 33)
Jos van Emden (NED)	27 June 1985 (aged 31)
Gijs Van Hoecke (BEL)	12 November 1991 (aged 25)
Alexey Vermeulen (USA)	16 December 1994 (aged 22)
Robert Wagner (GER)	17 April 1983 (aged 33)
Maarten Wynants (BEL)	13 May 1982 (aged 34)

Riders who joined the team for the 2017 season

Rider	2016 team
Lars Boom	Astana
Stef Clement	IAM Cycling
Floris De Tier	Topsport Vlaanderen–Baloise
Amund Grøndahl Jansen	Team Joker Byggtorget
Juan José Lobato	Movistar Team
Daan Olivier	ex-pro (Team Giant–Alpecin, 2015)
Antwan Tolhoek	Roompot–Oranje Peloton
Jurgen Van den Broeck	Team Katusha
Gijs Van Hoecke	Topsport Vlaanderen–Baloise

Riders who left the team during or after the 2016 season

Rider	2017 team
Moreno Hofland	Lotto–Soudal
Wilco Kelderman	Team Sunweb
Mike Teunissen	Team Sunweb
Maarten Tjallingii	Retired
Tom Van Asbroeck	Cannondale–Drapac
Dennis van Winden	Israel Cycling Academy
Sep Vanmarcke	Cannondale–Drapac

== Season victories ==
Date	Race	Competition	Rider	Country	Location
4 February	Dubai Tour, Youth classification	UCI Asia Tour	Dylan Groenewegen (NED)	United Arab Emirates	
17 February	Vuelta a Andalucía, Stage 3	UCI Europe Tour	Victor Campenaerts (BEL)	Spain	Lucena
19 February	Volta ao Algarve, Overall	UCI Europe Tour	Primož Roglič (SLO)	Portugal	
5 March	Dwars door West-Vlaanderen	UCI Europe Tour	Jos van Emden (NED)	Belgium	Ichtegem
6 April	Tour of the Basque Country, Stage 4	UCI World Tour	Primož Roglič (SLO)	Spain	Bilbao
8 April	Tour of the Basque Country, Stage 6	UCI World Tour	Primož Roglič (SLO)	Spain	Eibar
28 April	Tour de Yorkshire, Stage 1	UCI Europe Tour	Dylan Groenewegen (NED)	United Kingdom	Scarborough
30 April	Tour de Romandie, Stage 5	UCI World Tour	Primož Roglič (SLO)	Switzerland	Lausanne
18 May	Tour of Norway, Stage 2	UCI Europe Tour	Dylan Groenewegen (NED)	Norway	Brumunddal
20 May	Tour of Norway, Stage 4	UCI Europe Tour	Dylan Groenewegen (NED)	Norway	Sarpsborg
20 May	Tour of California, Overall	UCI World Tour	George Bennett (NZL)	United States	
25 May	Tour des Fjords, Stage 2	UCI Europe Tour	Timo Roosen (NED)	Norway	Norheimsund
28 May	Giro d'Italia, Stage 21	UCI World Tour	Jos van Emden (NED)	Italy	Milan
6 June	Critérium du Dauphiné, Stage 3	UCI World Tour	Koen Bouwman (NED)	France	Tullins
11 June	Critérium du Dauphiné, Mountains classification	UCI World Tour	Koen Bouwman (NED)	France	
14 June	Ster ZLM Toer, Prologue	UCI Europe Tour	Primož Roglič (SLO)	Netherlands	Westkapelle
15 June	Ster ZLM Toer, Stage 1	UCI Europe Tour	Dylan Groenewegen (NED)	Netherlands	Hoogerheide
16 June	Ster ZLM Toer, Stage 2	UCI Europe Tour	Dylan Groenewegen (NED)	Netherlands	Buchten
18 June	Ster ZLM Toer, Points classification	UCI Europe Tour	Dylan Groenewegen (NED)	Netherlands	
19 July	Tour de France, Stage 17	UCI World Tour	Primož Roglič (SLO)	France	Serre Chevalier
23 July	Tour de France, Stage 21	UCI World Tour	Dylan Groenewegen (NED)	France	Paris
9 August	Tour de l'Ain, Stage 1	UCI Europe Tour	Juan José Lobato (ESP)	France	Trévoux
11 August	BinckBank Tour, Stage 5	UCI World Tour	Lars Boom (NED)	Netherlands	Sittard-Geleen
7 September	Tour of Britain, Stage 5(ITT)	UCI Europe Tour	Lars Boom (NED)	United Kingdom	Tendring
9 September	Tour of Britain, Stage 7	UCI Europe Tour	Dylan Groenewegen (NED)	United Kingdom	Cheltenham
10 September	Tour of Britain, Overall	UCI Europe Tour	Lars Boom (NED)	United Kingdom	
14 October	Tacx Pro Classic	UCI Europe Tour	Timo Roosen (NED)	Netherlands	Neeltje Jans
23 October	Tour of Guangxi, Stage 5	UCI World Tour	Dylan Groenewegen (NED)	China	Guilin

== National, Continental and World champions 2017 ==
Date	Discipline	Jersey	Rider	Country	Location
3 August	European Time Trial Champion		Victor Campenaerts (BEL)	Denmark	Herning
