= 2017 FDJ season =

FDJ
- 2017 season
- UCI code: FDJ
- Status: UCI WorldTeam
- Manager: Marc Madiot
- Main sponsor(s): Française des Jeux
- Based: France
- Bicycles: Lapierre
- Groupset: Shimano

Season victories
- One-day races: 4
- Stage race overall: 2
- Stage race stages: 15
- National Championships: 3

The 2017 season for FDJ began in January at the Tour Down Under. As a UCI WorldTeam, they were automatically invited and obligated to send a squad to every event in the UCI World Tour.

== Team roster ==
As of 1 January 2017.

Rider	Date of birth
William Bonnet (FRA)	25 June 1982 (aged 34)
Davide Cimolai (ITA)	13 August 1989 (aged 27)
Arnaud Courteille (FRA)	13 March 1989 (aged 27)
Mickaël Delage (FRA)	6 August 1985 (aged 31)
Arnaud Démare (FRA)	26 August 1991 (aged 25)
Odd Christian Eiking (NOR)	28 December 1994 (aged 22)
Marc Fournier (FRA)	12 November 1994 (aged 22)
David Gaudu (FRA)	10 October 1996 (aged 20)
Jacopo Guarnieri (ITA)	14 August 1987 (aged 29)
Daniel Hoelgaard (NOR)	1 July 1993 (aged 23)
Ignatas Konovalovas (LTU)	8 December 1985 (aged 31)
Mathieu Ladagnous (FRA)	12 December 1984 (aged 32)
Johan Le Bon (FRA)	3 October 1990 (aged 26)
Olivier Le Gac (FRA)	27 August 1993 (aged 23)
Tobias Ludvigsson (SWE)	22 February 1991 (aged 25)

Rider	Date of birth
Jérémy Maison (FRA)	21 July 1993 (aged 23)
Lorrenzo Manzin (FRA)	26 July 1994 (aged 22)
Rudy Molard (FRA)	17 September 1989 (aged 27)
Steve Morabito (SUI)	30 January 1983 (aged 33)
Cédric Pineau (FRA)	8 May 1985 (aged 31)
Thibaut Pinot (FRA)	29 May 1990 (aged 26)
Sébastien Reichenbach (SUI)	28 May 1989 (aged 27)
Kévin Reza (FRA)	18 May 1988 (aged 28)
Anthony Roux (FRA)	18 April 1987 (aged 29)
Jérémy Roy (FRA)	22 June 1983 (aged 33)
Marc Sarreau (FRA)	10 June 1993 (aged 23)
Benoît Vaugrenard (FRA)	5 January 1982 (aged 34)
Arthur Vichot (FRA)	26 November 1988 (aged 28)
Léo Vincent (FRA)	6 November 1995 (aged 21)

Riders who joined the team for the 2017 season

Rider	2016 team
Davide Cimolai	Lampre–Merida
David Gaudu	neo-pro (Cotes d'Armor-Marie Morin)
Jacopo Guarnieri	Team Katusha
Tobias Ludvigsson	Team Giant–Alpecin
Rudy Molard	Cofidis
Léo Vincent	neo-pro (CC Étupes)

Riders who left the team during or after the 2016 season

Rider	2017 team
Sébastien Chavanel	Retired
Kenny Elissonde	Team Sky
Murilo Fischer	Retired
Alexandre Geniez	AG2R La Mondiale
Pierre-Henri Lecuisinier	
Yoann Offredo	Wanty–Groupe Gobert
Laurent Pichon	Fortuneo–Vital Concept

== Season victories ==
Date	Race	Competition	Rider	Country	Location
29 January	Grand Prix d'Ouverture La Marseillaise	UCI Europe Tour	Arthur Vichot (FRA)	France	Marseille
1 February	Étoile de Bessèges, Stage 1	UCI Europe Tour	Arnaud Démare (FRA)	France	Beaucaire
4 February	Étoile de Bessèges, Stage 4	UCI Europe Tour	Arnaud Démare (FRA)	France	Laudun-l'Ardoise
16 February	Vuelta a Andalucía, Stage 2	UCI Europe Tour	Thibaut Pinot (FRA)	Spain	Mancha Real
19 February	Tour du Haut Var, Overall	UCI Europe Tour	Arthur Vichot (FRA)	France	
19 February	Tour du Haut Var, Points classification	UCI Europe Tour	Arthur Vichot (FRA)	France	
23 February	Tour La Provence, Youth classification	UCI Europe Tour	Léo Vincent (FRA)	France	
5 March	Paris–Nice, Stage 1	UCI World Tour	Arnaud Démare (FRA)	France	Bois-d'Arcy
20 March	Volta a Catalunya, Stage 1	UCI World Tour	Davide Cimolai (ITA)	Spain	Calella
13 April	Grand Prix de Denain	UCI Europe Tour	Arnaud Démare (FRA)	France	Denain
21 April	Tour of the Alps, Stage 5	UCI Europe Tour	Thibaut Pinot (FRA)	Italy	Trento
10 May	Four Days of Dunkirk, Stage 2	UCI Europe Tour	Arnaud Démare (FRA)	France	Saint-Quentin
13 May	Four Days of Dunkirk, Stage 5	UCI Europe Tour	Ignatas Konovalovas (LTU)	France	Cassel
27 May	Giro d'Italia, Stage 20	UCI World Tour	Thibaut Pinot (FRA)	Italy	Asiago
28 May	Boucles de l'Aulne	UCI Europe Tour	Odd Christian Eiking (NOR)	France	Châteaulin
1 June	Boucles de la Mayenne, Prologue	UCI Europe Tour	Johan Le Bon (FRA)	France	Laval
2 June	Boucles de la Mayenne, Stage 1	UCI Europe Tour	Johan Le Bon (FRA)	France	Ernée
5 June	Critérium du Dauphiné, Stage 2	UCI World Tour	Arnaud Démare (FRA)	France	Arlanc
11 June	Critérium du Dauphiné, Points classification	UCI World Tour	Arnaud Démare (FRA)	France	
21 June	Halle–Ingooigem	UCI Europe Tour	Arnaud Démare (FRA)	Belgium	Ingooigem
4 July	Tour de France, Stage 3	UCI World Tour	Arnaud Démare (FRA)	France	Vittel
8 August	Tour de l'Ain, Prologue	UCI Europe Tour	Johan Le Bon (FRA)	France	Bourg-en-Bresse
11 August	Tour de l'Ain, Stage 3	UCI Europe Tour	David Gaudu (FRA)	France	Oyonnax
12 August	Tour de l'Ain, Overall	UCI Europe Tour	Thibaut Pinot (FRA)	France	
12 August	Tour de l'Ain, Mountains classification	UCI Europe Tour	Thibaut Pinot (FRA)	France	
12 August	Tour de l'Ain, Youth classification	UCI Europe Tour	David Gaudu (FRA)	France	

== National, Continental and World champions 2017 ==
Date	Discipline	Jersey	Rider	Country	Location
22 June	Swedish National Time Trial Champion		Tobias Ludvigsson (SWE)	Sweden	Burseryd
23 June	Lithuanian National Time Trial Champion		Ignatas Konovalovas (LTU)	Lithuania	Gargždai
25 June	French National Road Race Champion		Arnaud Démare (FRA)	France	Saint-Omer
