= 2017 Grand Prix Cycliste de Québec =

2017 UCI World Tour, race 33 of 37

Race details
- Dates: 8 September 2017
- Stages: 1
- Distance: 201.6 km (125.3 mi)
- Winning time: 5h 0' 31"

Results
	Winner	Peter Sagan (SVK)	(Bora–Hansgrohe)
	Second	Greg Van Avermaet (BEL)	(BMC Racing Team)
	Third	Michael Matthews (AUS)	(Team Sunweb)

The 2017 Grand Prix Cycliste de Québec is a road cycling one-day race that took place on 8 September. It was the 8th edition of the Grand Prix Cycliste de Québec and the 33rd event of the 2017 UCI World Tour. It was won by Peter Sagan in the sprint.

== Results ==
	Cyclist	Team	Time	UCI World Tour Points
1	Peter Sagan (SVK)	Bora–Hansgrohe	5h 00' 31"	500
2	Greg Van Avermaet (BEL)	BMC Racing Team	+ 0"	400
3	Michael Matthews (AUS)	Team Sunweb	+ 0"	325
4	Alexis Vuillermoz (FRA)	AG2R La Mondiale	+ 0"	275
5	Tim Wellens (BEL)	Lotto–Soudal	+ 0"	225
6	Tom-Jelte Slagter (NED)	Cannondale–Drapac	+ 0"	175
7	Petr Vakoč (CZE)	Quick-Step Floors	+ 0"	150
8	Sep Vanmarcke (BEL)	Cannondale–Drapac	+ 0"	125
9	Tony Gallopin (FRA)	Lotto–Soudal	+ 0"	100
10	Sonny Colbrelli (ITA)	Bahrain–Merida	+ 0"	85
