= 2017 Eschborn–Frankfurt – Rund um den Finanzplatz =

Cycling race

2017 UCI World Tour, race 20 of 37

Race details
- Dates: 1 May 2017
- Stages: 1
- Distance: 215.7 km (134.0 mi)
- Winning time: 5h 29' 32"

Results
	Winner	Alexander Kristoff (NOR)	(Team Katusha–Alpecin)
	Second	Rick Zabel (GER)	(Team Katusha–Alpecin)
	Third	John Degenkolb (GER)	(Trek–Segafredo)

The 2017 Eschborn–Frankfurt – Rund um den Finanzplatz was a road cycling one-day race that took place, as customary, on Tag der Arbeit (Labour Day), 1 May in Germany. It was the 55th edition of the Eschborn–Frankfurt – Rund um den Finanzplatz and the twentieth event of the 2017 UCI World Tour. It was the race's first appearance on the World Tour calendar.

The race was won by Team Katusha–Alpecin's Alexander Kristoff after a strong lead-out from teammate Rick Zabel; Kristoff finished several lengths ahead of the next closest competitor, taking his third victory at the race, matching the record of Erik Zabel, Rick's father. Rick Zabel was able to finish in second place, while the podium was completed by another German rider, John Degenkolb, for the Trek–Segafredo team.

== Route ==
The race started in Eschborn and finished in Frankfurt, traveling through the Taunus mid-mountain range northwest of Frankfurt. The main difficulties are the climbs of the Feldberg, Ruppershain and Mammolshain. The race ends with three laps of 4.5 kilometres (2.8 miles) in Frankfurt's city centre and finishes in front of the Alte Oper (Old Opera), the city's main concert hall, covering a total distance of 215.7 kilometres (134.0 miles).

== Teams ==
As a new event to the UCI World Tour, all UCI WorldTeams were invited to the race, but not obligated to compete in the race. As such, eleven of the eighteen WorldTeams elected to compete. Eight UCI Professional Continental teams competed, and a German national team completed the 20-team peloton.

UCI WorldTeams

- AG2R La Mondiale
- BMC Racing Team
- Bora–Hansgrohe
- Cannondale–Drapac
- Team Katusha–Alpecin
- LottoNL–Jumbo
- Lotto–Soudal
- Quick-Step Floors
- Team Sunweb
- Trek–Segafredo
- UAE Team Emirates

UCI Professional Continental teams

- Aqua Blue Sport
- CCC–Sprandi–Polkowice
- Gazprom–RusVelo
- Roompot–Nederlandse Loterij
- Sport Vlaanderen–Baloise
- Vérandas Willems–Crelan
- Wanty–Groupe Gobert
- WB Veranclassic Aqua Protect

National teams

- Germany

== Result ==
Result
Rank	Rider	Team	Time
1	Alexander Kristoff (NOR)	Team Katusha–Alpecin	5h 29' 32"
2	Rick Zabel (GER)	Team Katusha–Alpecin	+ 0"
3	John Degenkolb (GER)	Trek–Segafredo	+ 0"
4	Jempy Drucker (LUX)	BMC Racing Team	+ 0"
5	Pim Ligthart (NED)	Roompot–Nederlandse Loterij	+ 0"
6	Juan José Lobato (ESP)	LottoNL–Jumbo	+ 0"
7	Jasper Stuyven (BEL)	Trek–Segafredo	+ 0"
8	Maximiliano Richeze (ARG)	Quick-Step Floors	+ 0"
9	Michel Kreder (NED)	Aqua Blue Sport	+ 0"
10	Ben Swift (GBR)	UAE Team Emirates	+ 0"
