= 2017 Cadel Evans Great Ocean Road Race =

Cycling race

2017 UCI World Tour, race 2 of 37

Race details
- Dates: 29 January 2017
- Stages: 1
- Distance: 174 km (108 mi)
- Winning time: 4h 19' 15"

Results
	Winner	Nikias Arndt (GER)	(Team Sunweb)
	Second	Simon Gerrans (AUS)	(Orica–Scott)
	Third	Cameron Meyer (AUS)	(Australia (national team))

The 2017 Cadel Evans Great Ocean Road Race was a road cycling one-day race that took place on 29 January. It was the third edition of the Cadel Evans Great Ocean Road Race and the second event of the 2017 UCI World Tour. It was the first time that the race was included in the UCI World Tour calendar.

In a reduced-field sprint finish, Team Sunweb rider Nikias Arndt won the race ahead of Australians Simon Gerrans (Orica–Scott) and Cameron Meyer, who was riding for a selected Australian national team.

== Teams ==
As a new event to the UCI World Tour, all UCI WorldTeams were invited to the race, but not obligated to compete in the race. As such, thirteen of the eighteen WorldTeams competed in the race. Four UCI Professional Continental teams competed, while an Australian national squad completed the 18-team peloton.

UCI WorldTeams

- AG2R La Mondiale
- BMC Racing Team
- Bora–Hansgrohe
- Cannondale–Drapac
- Team Dimension Data
- Team Katusha–Alpecin
- LottoNL–Jumbo
- Lotto–Soudal
- Orica–Scott
- Quick-Step Floors
- Team Sunweb
- Team Sky
- Trek–Segafredo

Wildcard teams

- Aqua Blue Sport
- Gazprom–RusVelo
- Roompot–Nederlandse Loterij
- UnitedHealthcare
- Australia (national team)

== Result ==
Result
Rank	Rider	Team	Time
1	Nikias Arndt (GER)	Team Sunweb	4h 19' 15"
2	Simon Gerrans (AUS)	Orica–Scott	+ 0"
3	Cameron Meyer (AUS)	Australia (national team)	+ 0"
4	Jhonatan Restrepo (COL)	Team Katusha–Alpecin	+ 0"
5	Luke Rowe (GBR)	Team Sky	+ 0"
6	Petr Vakoč (CZE)	Quick-Step Floors	+ 0"
7	Nathan Haas (AUS)	Team Dimension Data	+ 0"
8	Gianluca Brambilla (ITA)	Quick-Step Floors	+ 0"
9	Jay McCarthy (AUS)	Bora–Hansgrohe	+ 0"
10	Paul Martens (GER)	LottoNL–Jumbo	+ 0"
