= 2017 La Flèche Wallonne =

Cycling race

2017 UCI World Tour, race 17 of 37
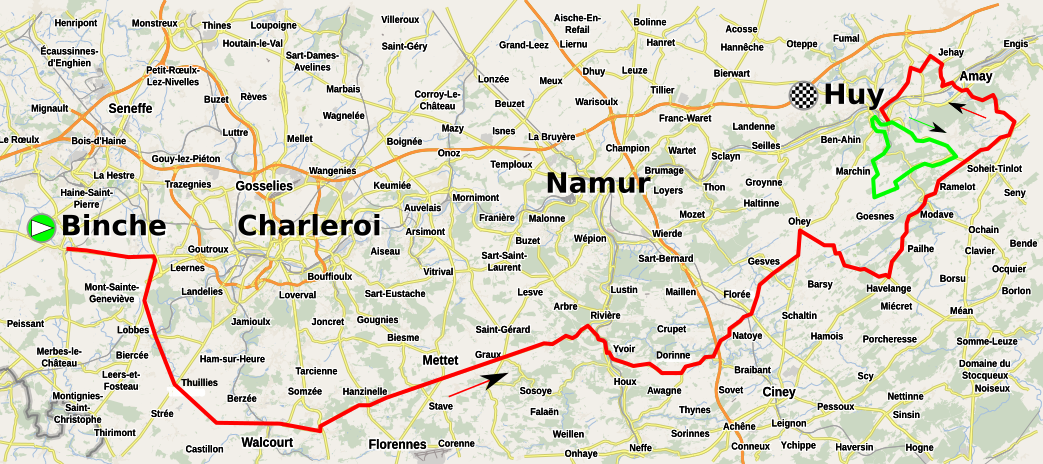
- The route of the 2017 La Flèche Wallonne

Race details
- Dates: 19 April 2017
- Stages: 1
- Distance: 204.5 km (127.1 mi)
- Winning time: 5h 15' 37"

Results
	Winner	Alejandro Valverde (ESP)	(Movistar Team)
	Second	Dan Martin (IRL)	(Quick-Step Floors)
	Third	Dylan Teuns (BEL)	(BMC Racing Team)

The 2017 La Flèche Wallonne was a road cycling one-day race that took place between Binche and Huy in Belgium, on 19 April 2017. It was the 81st edition of the La Flèche Wallonne and the seventeenth event of the 2017 UCI World Tour.

Spanish rider Alejandro Valverde (Movistar Team) won the race atop the Mur de Huy for the fourth successive year, and a record-extending fifth victory overall. Ireland's Dan Martin finished second for Quick-Step Floors, while the podium was completed by the Belgian rider, Dylan Teuns for the BMC Racing Team. Of the race's 200 starters, 166 riders finished the race.

== Teams ==
As La Flèche Wallonne was a UCI World Tour event, all eighteen UCI WorldTeams were invited automatically and obliged to enter a team in the race. Seven UCI Professional Continental teams competed, completing the 25-team peloton.

UCI WorldTeams

- AG2R La Mondiale
- Astana
- Bahrain–Merida
- BMC Racing Team
- Bora–Hansgrohe
- Cannondale–Drapac
- Team Dimension Data
- FDJ
- Team Katusha–Alpecin
- LottoNL–Jumbo
- Lotto–Soudal
- Movistar Team
- Orica–Scott
- Quick-Step Floors
- Team Sky
- Team Sunweb
- Trek–Segafredo
- UAE Team Emirates

UCI Professional Continental teams

- Aqua Blue Sport
- Cofidis
- Direct Énergie
- Fortuneo–Vital Concept
- Sport Vlaanderen–Baloise
- Wanty–Groupe Gobert
- WB Veranclassic Aqua Protect

== Result ==
Result
Rank	Rider	Team	Time
1	Alejandro Valverde (ESP)	Movistar Team	5h 15' 37"
2	Dan Martin (IRL)	Quick-Step Floors	+ 1"
3	Dylan Teuns (BEL)	BMC Racing Team	+ 1"
4	Sergio Henao (COL)	Team Sky	+ 1"
5	Michael Albasini (SUI)	Orica–Scott	+ 1"
6	Warren Barguil (FRA)	Team Sunweb	+ 1"
7	Michał Kwiatkowski (POL)	Team Sky	+ 1"
8	Rudy Molard (FRA)	FDJ	+ 1"
9	David Gaudu (FRA)	FDJ	+ 1"
10	Diego Ulissi (ITA)	UAE Team Emirates	+ 1"
