= Hammer Series =

Cycling race series

Race details
- Date: May–October
- Region: Limburg, Netherlands (2017–); Stavanger, Norway (2018–); Hong Kong (2018–)
- Discipline: Road
- Competition: UCI Asia Tour; UCI Europe Tour
- Type: Stage race
- Organiser: Velon CC
- Web site: hammerseries.com

History
- First edition: 2017
- First winner: Team Sky
- Most wins: Soudal–Quick-Step; Team Jayco–AlUla (2 wins)
- Most recent: Deceuninck–Quick-Step

The Hammer Series is a series of cycling races organised by Velon in which teams compete against each other to determine the winning formation, instead of individual riders. The races are part of the UCI Asia Tour or UCI Europe Tour in category 2.1 or 1.1. The races consist of three days, with each posing a separate challenge, sprint, climb and Team Time Trial chase. The races are organised by Velon.

The name Hammer refers to a pro cycling term “Drop the Hammer”, which is the moment when a rider decides to make a break away from his rivals.

== Controversies ==
=== Velon's complaint against the UCI ===
Velon is a cycling media organisation created in 2014 by 11 World Tour teams. The organisation develop media content that is not often available via the UCI. Velon launched the Hammer Series in 2017. On 20 September 2019, Velon, with the unanimous support of its shareholders, submitted an anti-trust Complaint to the European Commission against the Union Cycliste Internationale (UCI) based on Articles 101 and 102 TFEU.

The complaint taken to the European Commission was over two issues. The first issue is the use of the word “series” in Velon’s Hammer Series.

Amidst their legal battle with the UCI, Velon decided to suspend their 2020 races as they claimed that the UCI was trying to torpedo the race series. Before the cancellation, Velon had planned on expanding the series, including a new event that was to be held in February in Pereira, Colombia that featured both men's and women's races.

== Winners ==
Year	Date	Location	Hammer Races			Race winner	Series champion
Year	Date	Location	Climb	Sprint	Chase	Race winner	Series champion
2017	2–4 June	(Netherlands) Limburg	(Spain) Movistar Team	(United States) Trek–Segafredo	(United Kingdom) Team Sky	(United Kingdom) Team Sky	(United Kingdom) Team Sky
2018	25–27 May	(Norway) Stavanger	(Australia) Mitchelton–Scott	(Australia) Mitchelton–Scott	(Australia) Mitchelton–Scott	(Australia) Mitchelton–Scott	(Australia) Mitchelton–Scott
2018	1–3 June	(Netherlands) Limburg	Bahrain–Merida	(Australia) Mitchelton–Scott	(Australia) Mitchelton–Scott	(Belgium) Quick-Step Floors	(Australia) Mitchelton–Scott
2018	14 October	Hong Kong	Not held	(Australia) Mitchelton–Scott	(Germany) Team Sunweb	(Australia) Mitchelton–Scott	(Australia) Mitchelton–Scott
2019	24–26 May	(Norway) Stavanger	(Netherlands) Team Jumbo–Visma	(Belgium) Deceuninck–Quick-Step	(Poland) CCC Team	(Netherlands) Team Jumbo–Visma	(Netherlands) Team Jumbo–Visma
2019	7–9 June	(Netherlands) Limburg	(Belgium) Deceuninck–Quick-Step	(Belgium) Deceuninck–Quick-Step	(Australia) Mitchelton–Scott	(Belgium) Deceuninck–Quick-Step	(Netherlands) Team Jumbo–Visma
2019	12–13 October	Hong Kong	Not held	Cancelled			(Netherlands) Team Jumbo–Visma
