= 2016 Tour de Wallonie =

2016 UCI Europe Tour

Race details
- Dates: 23–27 July 2016
- Stages: 5
- Distance: 927 km (576.0 mi)
- Winning time: 22h 02' 48"

Results
Jersey awarded to the overall winner	Winner	Dries Devenyns (BEL)	(IAM Cycling)
	Second	Gianni Meersman (BEL)	(Etixx–Quick-Step)
	Third	Vyacheslav Kuznetsov (RUS)	(Team Katusha)
Jersey awarded to the points classification winner	Points	Matteo Trentin (ITA)	(Etixx–Quick-Step)
Jersey awarded to the mountains classification winner	Mountains	Baptiste Planckaert (BEL)	(Wallonie-Bruxelles–Group Protect)
	Youth	Florian Sénéchal (FRA)	(Cofidis)
Jersey awarded to the sprints classification winner	Sprints	Vyacheslav Kuznetsov (RUS)	(Team Katusha)
	Team	Topsport Vlaanderen–Baloise	

The 2016 Tour de Wallonie is a five-stage men's professional road cycling race. It is the forty-third running of the Tour de Wallonie. The race started on 23 July in Charleroi and finished on 27 July in Dison.

== Schedule ==
List of stages
Stage	Date	Course	Distance	Type	Winner
1	23 July	Charleroi - Mettet	178.3 km (111 mi)	Flat stage	Tom Boonen (BEL)
2	24 July	Saint-Ghislain - Le Rœulx	182.7 km (114 mi)	Flat stage	Boris Vallée (BEL)
3	25 July	Braine-l'Alleud - Vielsalm	200.6 km (125 mi)	Hilly stage	Dimitri Claeys (BEL)
4	26 July	Aubel - Herstal	177.1 km (110 mi)	Hilly stage	Matteo Trentin (ITA)
5	27 July	Engis - Dison	189.3 km (118 mi)	Hilly stage	Dries Devenyns (BEL)

== Teams ==
The eighteen teams invited to participate in the Tour de Wallonie were:

World Tour teams

- AG2R La Mondiale
- Etixx–Quick-Step
- FDJ
- IAM Cycling
- Team Katusha
- Lotto–Soudal

Professional Continental teams

- Cofidis
- Direct Énergie
- Fortuneo–Vital Concept
- Gazprom–RusVelo
- Roompot–Oranje Peloton
- Topsport Vlaanderen–Baloise
- Wanty–Groupe Gobert

Continental teams

- Armée de Terre
- Color Code–Arden'Beef
- Crelan–Vastgoedservice
- Veranclassic–Ago
- Wallonie-Bruxelles–Group Protect

== Stages ==
=== Stage 1 ===
23 July 2016 – Charleroi to Mettet, 178.3 km (110.8 mi)

Result of stage 1
Rank	Rider	Team	Time
1	Tom Boonen (BEL)	Etixx–Quick-Step	4h 15' 32"
2	Jonas van Genechten (BEL)	IAM Cycling	s.t.
3	Arnaud Démare (FRA)	FDJ	s.t.
4	Matteo Trentin (ITA)	Etixx–Quick-Step	s.t.
5	Baptiste Planckaert (BEL)	Wallonie-Bruxelles–Group Protect	s.t.
6	Kenny Dehaes (BEL)	Wanty–Groupe Gobert	s.t.
7	Boris Vallée (BEL)	Fortuneo–Vital Concept	s.t.
8	Bert Van Lerberghe (BEL)	Topsport Vlaanderen–Baloise	s.t.
9	Bryan Alaphilippe (FRA)	Armée de Terre	s.t.
10	Gerry Druyts (BEL)	Crelan–Vastgoedservice	s.t.
Source: ProCyclingStats

General classification after stage 1
Rank	Rider	Team	Time
1	Tom Boonen (BEL)	Etixx–Quick-Step	4h 15' 22"
2	Jonas van Genechten (BEL)	IAM Cycling	+ 4"
3	Viacheslav Kuznetsov (RUS)	Team Katusha	+ 4"
4	Arnaud Démare (FRA)	FDJ	+ 6"
5	Guillaume Bonnafond (FRA)	AG2R La Mondiale	+ 6"
6	Loïc Chetout (FRA)	Cofidis	+ 7"
7	Alexander Kolobnev (RUS)	Gazprom–RusVelo	+ 8"
8	Thomas Deruette (BEL)	Wallonie-Bruxelles–Group Protect	+ 8"
9	Eliot Lietaer (BEL)	Topsport Vlaanderen–Baloise	+ 9"
10	Matteo Trentin (ITA)	Etixx–Quick-Step	+ 10"
Source: ProCyclingStats

=== Stage 2 ===
24 July 2016 – Saint-Ghislain to Le Rœulx, 182.7 km (113.5 mi)

Result of stage 2
Rank	Rider	Team	Time
1	Boris Vallée (BEL)	Fortuneo–Vital Concept	4h 18' 50"
2	Tom Boonen (BEL)	Etixx–Quick-Step	s.t.
3	Roman Maikin (RUS)	Gazprom–RusVelo	s.t.
4	Matteo Trentin (ITA)	Etixx–Quick-Step	s.t.
5	Jonas van Genechten (BEL)	IAM Cycling	s.t.
6	Kris Boeckmans (BEL)	Lotto–Soudal	s.t.
7	Matteo Pelucchi (ITA)	IAM Cycling	s.t.
8	Vladimir Isaichev (RUS)	Team Katusha	s.t.
9	Hugo Hofstetter (FRA)	Cofidis	s.t.
10	Bert Van Lerberghe (BEL)	Topsport Vlaanderen–Baloise	s.t.
Source: ProCyclingStats

General classification after stage 2
Rank	Rider	Team	Time
1	Tom Boonen (BEL)	Etixx–Quick-Step	8h 34' 06"
2	Boris Vallée (BEL)	Fortuneo–Vital Concept	+ 6"
3	Viacheslav Kuznetsov (RUS)	Team Katusha	+ 9"
4	Jonas van Genechten (BEL)	IAM Cycling	+ 10"
5	Antoine Warnier (BEL)	Wallonie-Bruxelles–Group Protect	+ 11"
6	Roman Maikin (RUS)	Gazprom–RusVelo	+ 12"
7	Guillaume Bonnafond (FRA)	AG2R La Mondiale	+ 12"
8	Mamyr Stash (RUS)	Gazprom–RusVelo	+ 12"
9	Arnaud Démare (FRA)	FDJ	+ 12"
10	Loïc Chetout (FRA)	Cofidis	+ 13"
Source: ProCyclingStats

=== Stage 3 ===
25 July 2016 – Braine-l'Alleud to Vielsalm, 200.6 km (124.6 mi)

Result of stage 3
Rank	Rider	Team	Time
1	Dimitri Claeys (BEL)	Wanty–Groupe Gobert	4h 36' 35"
2	Gianni Meersman (BEL)	Etixx–Quick-Step	s.t.
3	Jonathan Hivert (FRA)	Fortuneo–Vital Concept	s.t.
4	Arnaud Démare (FRA)	FDJ	s.t.
5	Jérôme Baugnies (BEL)	Wanty–Groupe Gobert	s.t.
6	Florian Sénéchal (FRA)	Cofidis	s.t.
7	Xandro Meurisse (BEL)	Crelan–Vastgoedservice	s.t.
8	Lilian Calmejane (FRA)	Direct Énergie	s.t.
9	Pim Ligthart (NED)	Lotto–Soudal	s.t.
10	Viacheslav Kuznetsov (RUS)	Team Katusha	s.t.
Source: ProCyclingStats

General classification after stage 3
Rank	Rider	Team	Time
1	Gianni Meersman (BEL)	Etixx–Quick-Step	13h 10' 47"
2	Dimitri Claeys (BEL)	Wanty–Groupe Gobert	s.t.
3	Viacheslav Kuznetsov (RUS)	Team Katusha	+ 3"
4	Antoine Warnier (BEL)	Wallonie-Bruxelles–Group Protect	+ 5"
5	Guillaume Bonnafond (FRA)	AG2R La Mondiale	+ 6"
6	Arnaud Démare (FRA)	FDJ	+ 6"
7	Jonathan Hivert (FRA)	Fortuneo–Vital Concept	+ 6"
8	Franck Bonnamour (FRA)	Fortuneo–Vital Concept	+ 8"
9	Eliot Lietaer (BEL)	Topsport Vlaanderen–Baloise	+ 9"
10	Thomas Sprengers (BEL)	Topsport Vlaanderen–Baloise	+ 10"
Source: ProCyclingStats

=== Stage 4 ===
26 July 2016 – Aubel to Herstal, 177.1 km (110.0 mi)

Result of stage 4
Rank	Rider	Team	Time
1	Matteo Trentin (ITA)	Etixx–Quick-Step	4h 18' 08"
2	Gediminas Bagdonas (LTU)	AG2R La Mondiale	s.t.
3	Gianni Meersman (BEL)	Etixx–Quick-Step	s.t.
4	Pieter Vanspeybrouck (BEL)	Topsport Vlaanderen–Baloise	s.t.
5	Kris Boeckmans (BEL)	Lotto–Soudal	s.t.
6	Viacheslav Kuznetsov (RUS)	Team Katusha	s.t.
7	Tony Hurel (FRA)	Direct Énergie	s.t.
8	Florian Sénéchal (FRA)	Cofidis	s.t.
9	Vicente Reynès (ESP)	IAM Cycling	s.t.
10	Xandro Meurisse (BEL)	Crelan–Vastgoedservice	s.t.
Source: ProCyclingStats

General classification after stage 4
Rank	Rider	Team	Time
1	Gianni Meersman (BEL)	Etixx–Quick-Step	17h 28' 49"
2	Dimitri Claeys (BEL)	Wanty–Groupe Gobert	+ 6"
3	Viacheslav Kuznetsov (RUS)	Team Katusha	+ 9"
4	Antoine Warnier (BEL)	Wallonie-Bruxelles–Group Protect	+ 11"
5	Laurent Pichon (FRA)	FDJ	+ 11"
6	Guillaume Bonnafond (FRA)	AG2R La Mondiale	+ 12"
7	Arnaud Démare (FRA)	FDJ	+ 12"
8	Jonathan Hivert (FRA)	Fortuneo–Vital Concept	+ 12"
9	Thomas Sprengers (BEL)	Topsport Vlaanderen–Baloise	+ 13"
10	Dries Devenyns (BEL)	IAM Cycling	+ 13"
Source: ProCyclingStats

=== Stage 5 ===
27 July 2016 – Engis to Dison, 189.3 km (117.6 mi)

Result of stage 5
Rank	Rider	Team	Time
1	Dries Devenyns (BEL)	IAM Cycling	4h 33' 56"
2	Jelle Vanendert (BEL)	Lotto–Soudal	s.t.
3	Evgeny Shalunov (RUS)	Gazprom–RusVelo	s.t.
4	Viacheslav Kuznetsov (RUS)	Team Katusha	s.t.
5	Floris De Tier (BEL)	Topsport Vlaanderen–Baloise	s.t.
6	Florian Sénéchal (FRA)	Cofidis	+ 2"
7	Xandro Meurisse (BEL)	Crelan–Vastgoedservice	+ 2"
8	Egor Silin (RUS)	Team Katusha	+ 7"
9	Huub Duyn (NED)	Roompot–Oranje Peloton	+ 8"
10	Laurent Pichon (FRA)	FDJ	+ 8"
Source: ProCyclingStats

Final General classification
Rank	Rider	Team	Time
1	Dries Devenyns (BEL)	IAM Cycling	22h 02' 48"
2	Gianni Meersman (BEL)	Etixx–Quick-Step	+ 5"
3	Viacheslav Kuznetsov (RUS)	Team Katusha	+ 6"
4	Jelle Vanendert (BEL)	Lotto–Soudal	+ 7"
5	Evgeny Shalunov (RUS)	Gazprom–RusVelo	+ 9"
6	Floris De Tier (BEL)	Topsport Vlaanderen–Baloise	+ 13"
7	Xandro Meurisse (BEL)	Crelan–Vastgoedservice	+ 15"
8	Florian Sénéchal (FRA)	Cofidis	+ 15"
9	Laurent Pichon (FRA)	FDJ	+ 16"
10	Jonathan Hivert (FRA)	Fortuneo–Vital Concept	+ 17"
Source: ProCyclingStats

== Classification leadership ==
Stage	Winner	General classification	Points Classification	Mountains Classification	Youth Classification	Sprints Classification	Team Classification	Combativity award
1	Tom Boonen	Tom Boonen	Tom Boonen	Thomas Deruette	Loïc Chetout	Viacheslav Kuznetsov	Etixx–Quick-Step	Guillaume Bonnafond
2	Boris Vallée	Tom Boonen	Tom Boonen	Antoine Warnier	Boris Vallée	Viacheslav Kuznetsov	Etixx–Quick-Step	Ludovic Robeet
3	Dimitri Claeys	Gianni Meersman	Tom Boonen	Thomas Deruette	Antoine Warnier	Viacheslav Kuznetsov	IAM Cycling	Vladimir Isaichev
4	Matteo Trentin	Gianni Meersman	Matteo Trentin	Baptiste Planckaert	Antoine Warnier	Viacheslav Kuznetsov	Wanty–Groupe Gobert	Loïc Chetout
5	Dries Devenyns	Dries Devenyns	Matteo Trentin	Baptiste Planckaert	Florian Sénéchal	Viacheslav Kuznetsov	Topsport Vlaanderen–Baloise	Baptiste Planckaert
Final		Dries Devenyns	Matteo Trentin	Baptiste Planckaert	Florian Sénéchal	Vyacheslav Kuznetsov	Topsport Vlaanderen–Baloise	no award

Note:

- During stage 2, the green jersey was worn by Jonas van Genechten as second in the points standings, as leader Tom Boonen was already wearing the yellow jersey.
- During stage 3, the green jersey was worn by Jonas van Genechten as third in the points standings, as leader Tom Boonen was already wearing the yellow jersey and second places Boris Vallée was already wearing the white jersey.
