= 2014 Tour de Pologne =

2014 UCI World Tour, race 20 of 29
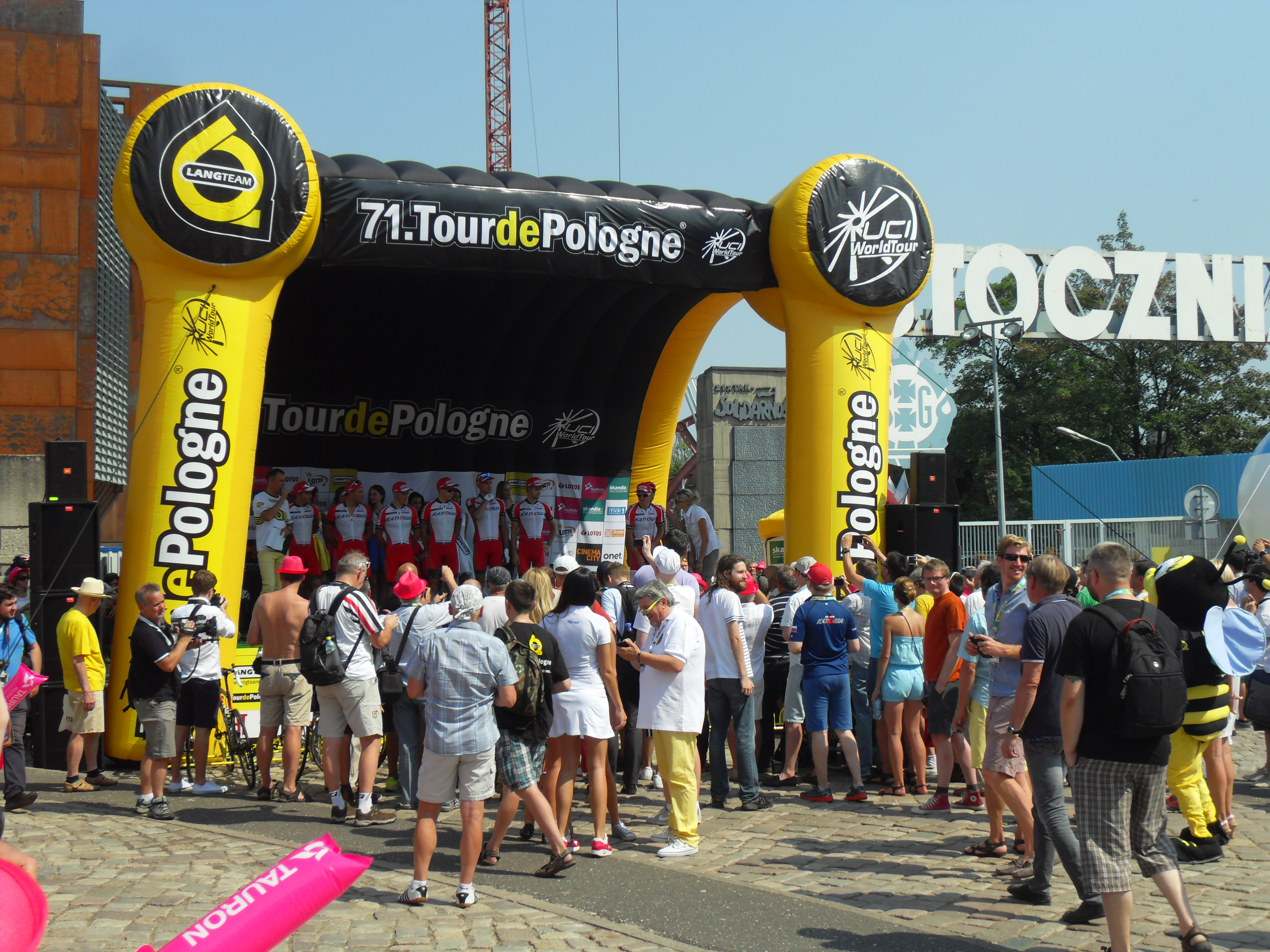

Race details
- Dates: 3–9 August 2014
- Stages: 7
- Distance: 1,251 km (777.3 mi)
- Winning time: 30h 16' 18"

Results
Jersey awarded to the overall winner	Winner	Rafał Majka (Poland)	(Tinkoff–Saxo)
	Second	Ion Izagirre (Spain)	(Movistar Team)
	Third	Beñat Intxausti (Spain)	(Movistar Team)
Jersey awarded to the points classification winner	Points	Yauheni Hutarovich (Belarus)	(Ag2r–La Mondiale)
Jersey awarded to the mountains classification winner	Mountains	Maciej Paterski (Poland)	(CCC–Polsat–Polkowice)
Jersey awarded to the sprints classification winner	Sprints	Matthias Krizek (Austria)	(Cannondale)
	Team	Movistar Team	

The 2014 Tour de Pologne was the 71st running of the Tour de Pologne cycling stage race. It started on 3 August in Gdańsk and ended on 9 August in Kraków, after seven stages. It was the twentieth race of the 2014 UCI World Tour season.

== Participating teams ==
As the Tour de Pologne was a UCI World Tour event, all eighteen UCI ProTeams were invited automatically and obligated to send a squad. Along with Team Poland – the Polish national team – two other squads were given wildcard places into the race, and as such, formed the event's 21-team peloton.

The twenty-one teams that competed in the race were:

- Ag2r–La Mondiale
- Astana
- Belkin Pro Cycling
- BMC Racing Team
- Cannondale
- CCC–Polsat–Polkowice
- Team Europcar
- FDJ.fr
- Giant–Shimano
- Garmin–Sharp
- Team Katusha
- Lampre–Merida
- Lotto–Belisol
- Movistar Team
- Omega Pharma–Quick-Step
- Orica–GreenEDGE
- Team Poland (national team)
- Team Sky
- Tinkoff–Saxo
- Trek Factory Racing
- RusVelo

== Schedule ==
Stage	Date	Route	Distance	Type	Winner
1	3 August	Gdańsk to Bydgoszcz	226 km (140.4 mi)	Flat stage	Yauheni Hutarovich (BLR)
2	4 August	Toruń to Warsaw	226 km (140.4 mi)	Flat stage	Petr Vakoč (CZE)
3	5 August	Kielce to Rzeszów	174 km (108.1 mi)	Flat stage	Theo Bos (NED)
4	6 August	Tarnów to Katowice	236 km (146.6 mi)	Medium-mountain stage	Jonas van Genechten (BEL)
5	7 August	Zakopane to Štrbské Pleso (Slovakia)	190 km (118.1 mi)	Mountain stage	Rafał Majka (POL)
6	8 August	Terma Bukowina Tatrzańska to Bukowina Tatrzańska	174 km (108.1 mi)	Mountain stage	Rafał Majka (POL)
7	9 August	Kraków to Kraków	25 km (15.5 mi)	Individual time trial	Kristof Vandewalle (BEL)

== Stages ==
=== Stage 1 ===
Stage 1 profile

3 August 2014 — Gdańsk to Bydgoszcz, 226 km (140.4 mi)

In line with the 25th anniversary of Poland moving from a communist to a democratic country and being freed from Soviet grasp, the 71st Tour de Pologne started in Gdańsk, a city famous for being the home of the Solidarność union, largely responsible for the political changes. The first stage was predominantly flat, featuring just one categorised climb, a third category ascent in Bydgoszcz, on the second of three 7.2-kilometre (4.5-mile) loops ending the stage. During the stage, there were also special sprints in Pruszcz Gdański and Malbork, as well as two intermediate sprints offering points for the intermediate sprints classification in Kwidzyn and Unisław. It was largely expected that this stage would be won by a sprinter, who would take the first yellow jersey.

Immediately after the start, a breakaway was initiated by Matthias Krizek of Cannondale, and he was shortly joined by Jimmy Engoulvent of Team Europcar and Anton Vorobyev of Team Katusha, as well as two home riders – Maciej Paterski of CCC–Polsat–Polkowice and Kamil Gradek riding for a selective Polish national team. The five riders built up an advantage that reached 15 minutes over the peloton. The riders faced extreme temperatures at the start, the mercury reaching 35 °C (95 °F). Gradek took maximum points at the intermediate sprint in Kwidzyn, whilst Engoulvent won at the Unisław sprint. With both riders having four points on their tally, the battle for the first navy blue jersey in the intermediate sprints classification would continue until the line.

Eventually, the peloton started to minimise the gap to the breakaway, but it was then that a torrential downpour hit the race, causing at least one tree to fall over and block part of the road and at least 4 crashes, including 1 in the breakaway. Paterski attacked on the streets of Bydgoszcz, trying to take the first fuchsia jersey. He succeeded, with only him, Engoulvent and Krizek remaining on the last lap. Paterski led the way to try and take the stage victory but was caught under the flamme rouge. A sprint finish was ensured, with Ag2r–La Mondiale's Yauheni Hutarovich taking the stage victory, and the yellow and white jerseys with it. As he came higher in the stage, Engoulvent beat Gradek to the navy blue jersey.

Stage 1 Result

	Rider	Team	Time
1	Yauheni Hutarovich (BLR)	Ag2r–La Mondiale	5h 47' 50"
2	Roman Maikin (RUS)	RusVelo	+ 0"
3	Manuele Mori (ITA)	Lampre–Merida	+ 0"
4	Guillaume Boivin (CAN)	Cannondale	+ 0"
5	Marco Haller (AUT)	Team Katusha	+ 0"
6	Nikolas Maes (BEL)	Omega Pharma–Quick-Step	+ 0"
7	Boris Vallée (BEL)	Lotto–Belisol	+ 0"
8	Sebastian Lander (DEN)	BMC Racing Team	+ 0"
9	Davide Formolo (ITA)	Cannondale	+ 0"
10	Enrico Gasparotto (ITA)	Astana	+ 0"

General Classification after Stage 1

	Rider	Team	Time
1	Yauheni Hutarovich (BLR)	Ag2r–La Mondiale	5h 47' 40"
2	Roman Maikin (RUS)	RusVelo	+ 4"
3	Manuele Mori (ITA)	Lampre–Merida	+ 6"
4	Maciej Paterski (POL)	CCC–Polsat–Polkowice	+ 8"
5	Matthias Krizek (AUT)	Cannondale	+ 8"
6	Guillaume Boivin (CAN)	Cannondale	+ 10"
7	Marco Haller (AUT)	Team Katusha	+ 10"
8	Nikolas Maes (BEL)	Omega Pharma–Quick-Step	+ 10"
9	Boris Vallée (BEL)	Lotto–Belisol	+ 10"
10	Sebastian Lander (DEN)	BMC Racing Team	+ 10"

=== Stage 2 ===
Stage 2 profile

4 August 2014 — Toruń to Warsaw, 226 km (140.4 mi)

Like the previous stage, this stage was suited towards the sprinters. Heading eastwards, there were no categorised climbs, ensuring that CCC–Polsat–Polkowice's Maciej Paterski would keep the fuchsia jersey. Also like the previous stage, there were two intermediate sprints, coming in Kampinos and in Stare Babice, ahead of a 4.8-kilometre (3.0-mile) loop in Warsaw, to be completed three times.

Further like in the first stage, the breakaway was formed just after the start. Petr Vakoč of Omega Pharma–Quick-Step attacked first and was shortly joined by Bartłomiej Matysiak and Przemysław Kasperkiewicz. With Ag2r–La Mondiale pacing the leader, Yauheni Hutarovich, the lead of the breakaway topped four minutes in the early running. However, at the time of the intermediate sprints (both were located towards the end of the stage), the lead of the trio reached seven minutes and the peloton was in no rush to chase them. Vakoč attacked at the second sprint (taking full points at both, thus taking the intermediate sprints' navy blue jersey) and rode solo into Warsaw, whilst the peloton tried to quickly catch him, failing to do so. Vakoč took the victory with a 21" advantage over the peloton, brought home by Michael Matthews. Thanks to the victory, Vakoč became the leader of the race. Hutarovich finished fifth, thus keeping the white jersey and second place, with a 27" deficit to Vakoč because of time bonuses.

Stage 2 Result

	Rider	Team	Time
1	Petr Vakoč (CZE)	Omega Pharma–Quick-Step	5h 23' 54"
2	Michael Matthews (AUS)	Orica–GreenEDGE	+ 21"
3	Boris Vallée (BEL)	Lotto–Belisol	+ 21"
4	Ramon Sinkeldam (NED)	Giant–Shimano	+ 21"
5	Yauheni Hutarovich (BLR)	Ag2r–La Mondiale	+ 21"
6	Nikolas Maes (BEL)	Omega Pharma–Quick-Step	+ 21"
7	Marco Haller (AUT)	Team Katusha	+ 21"
8	Guillaume Boivin (CAN)	Cannondale	+ 21"
9	Luka Mezgec (SLO)	Giant–Shimano	+ 21"
10	Tyler Farrar (USA)	Garmin–Sharp	+ 21"

General Classification after Stage 2

	Rider	Team	Time
1	Petr Vakoč (CZE)	Omega Pharma–Quick-Step	11h 11' 28"
2	Yauheni Hutarovich (BLR)	Ag2r–La Mondiale	+ 27"
3	Roman Maikin (RUS)	RusVelo	+ 31"
4	Boris Vallée (BEL)	Lotto–Belisol	+ 33"
5	Manuele Mori (ITA)	Lampre–Merida	+ 33"
6	Maciej Paterski (POL)	CCC–Polsat–Polkowice	+ 35"
7	Matthias Krizek (AUT)	Cannondale	+ 35"
8	Nikolas Maes (BEL)	Omega Pharma–Quick-Step	+ 37"
9	Marco Haller (AUT)	Team Katusha	+ 37"
10	Guillaume Boivin (CAN)	Cannondale	+ 37"

=== Stage 3 ===
Stage 3 profile

5 August 2014 — Kielce to Rzeszów, 174 km (108.1 mi)

Just like the previous two stages, this stage was aimed at the sprinters, although noticeably shorter. The parcours of 174 kilometres (108 miles) featured one intermediate sprint in Głogów Małopolski and one third category climb on the streets of Rzeszów. A 6-kilometre (3.7-mile) loop was also to be completed twice ahead of an expected sprint finish.

Again, the breakaway was formed right after the start, and included Team Sky's Salvatore Puccio, Team Europcar's Björn Thurau, CCC–Polsat–Polkowice's Mateusz Taciak and Team Poland's Paweł Franczak. The four riders built up an advantage that reached 4 minutes over the peloton controlled by Omega Pharma–Quick-Step protecting the overall race leader, Petr Vakoč. Thurau took full points at the sprint in Głogów whilst Taciak took the mountain points available in Rzeszów. The breakaway was eventually caught with 10 kilometres (6.2 miles) to go and the leadouts began. Giant–Shimano had the best leadout for Luka Mezgec, who started his sprint with about 300 metres (980 ft) to go. Just when it looked like he would take the stage victory, Belkin Pro Cycling's Theo Bos let go of Mezgec's wheel, passed him and ultimately beat Mezgec by half a bike length. In the general classification, no changes were visible, as 152 of the 164 riders were given the same time as Bos, including 4 caught up in a crash with 1 kilometre (0.62 miles) to go.

Stage 3 Result

	Rider	Team	Time
1	Theo Bos (NED)	Belkin Pro Cycling	3h 39' 27"
2	Luka Mezgec (SLO)	Giant–Shimano	+ 0"
3	Michael Matthews (AUS)	Orica–GreenEDGE	+ 0"
4	Sacha Modolo (ITA)	Lampre–Merida	+ 0"
5	Thor Hushovd (NOR)	BMC Racing Team	+ 0"
6	Tyler Farrar (USA)	Garmin–Sharp	+ 0"
7	Yauheni Hutarovich (BLR)	Ag2r–La Mondiale	+ 0"
8	Jonas van Genechten (BEL)	Lotto–Belisol	+ 0"
9	Davide Appollonio (ITA)	Ag2r–La Mondiale	+ 0"
10	Roberto Ferrari (ITA)	Lampre–Merida	+ 0"

General Classification after Stage 3

	Rider	Team	Time
1	Petr Vakoč (CZE)	Omega Pharma–Quick-Step	14h 50' 55"
2	Yauheni Hutarovich (BLR)	Ag2r–La Mondiale	+ 27"
3	Theo Bos (NED)	Belkin Pro Cycling	+ 27"
4	Roman Maikin (RUS)	RusVelo	+ 31"
5	Luka Mezgec (SLO)	Giant–Shimano	+ 31"
6	Boris Vallée (BEL)	Lotto–Belisol	+ 33"
7	Manuele Mori (ITA)	Lampre–Merida	+ 33"
8	Maciej Paterski (POL)	CCC–Polsat–Polkowice	+ 35"
9	Matthias Krizek (AUT)	Cannondale	+ 35"
10	Grzegorz Stępniak (POL)	CCC–Polsat–Polkowice	+ 37"

=== Stage 4 ===
Stage 4 profile

6 August 2014 — Tarnów to Katowice, 236 km (146.6 mi)

This stage was the longest stage of the 71st Tour de Pologne, and was almost identical to stage 4 the previous year. On the parcours of 236 kilometres (147 miles), there were three intermediate sprints in the towns of Jaworzno, Mysłowice and Siemanowice Śląskie, two special sprints in Szczurowa and Olkusz and two third-category climbs, both on the streets of Katowice, where the riders had to complete 4 laps of a 12.3-kilometre (7.6-mile) loop. There was some rolling terrain in the middle of the stage, yet none of the ascents were categorised. With the finish being on a downhill section of road by the Spodek arena, a sprint finish was expected to take place, with speeds reaching 70 kilometres per hour (43 mph).

Multiple groups attempted to breakaway from the peloton in the first part of the stage, but none were successful. It was not until over 2 hours into the race a group was allowed to break. The group consisted of Team Sky's Josh Edmondson, Cannondale's Matthias Krizek and CCC–Polsat–Polkowice's Mateusz Taciak. They built up an advantage over the peloton that topped four minutes. Krizek took full points at all three intermediate sprints which resulted in him taking over the navy blue jersey from the race leader Petr Vakoč, who was protected by his teammates from Omega Pharma–Quick-Step. Later, Taciak took full points on both climbs, which resulted in him taking over the fuchsia jersey from teammate Maciej Paterski.

The trio were eventually caught with one lap to go, and a series of solo counterattacks took place to try and prevent a sprint finish. However, none of these were successful and the peloton prepared for a sprint finish. To the surprise of most people, it was Jonas van Genechten of Lotto–Belisol who won the sprint whilst travelling at 80.8 kilometres per hour (50.2 mph). Vakoč kept his race lead whilst Krizek moved into second place, thanks to bonus seconds earned at the intermediate sprints.

Stage 4 Result

	Rider	Team	Time
1	Jonas van Genechten (BEL)	Lotto–Belisol	5h 43' 29"
2	Jacopo Guarnieri (ITA)	Astana	+ 0"
3	Luka Mezgec (SLO)	Giant–Shimano	+ 0"
4	Sacha Modolo (ITA)	Lampre–Merida	+ 0"
5	Yauheni Hutarovich (BLR)	Ag2r–La Mondiale	+ 0"
6	Davide Appollonio (ITA)	Ag2r–La Mondiale	+ 0"
7	Raymond Kreder (NED)	Garmin–Sharp	+ 0"
8	Nikias Arndt (GER)	Giant–Shimano	+ 0"
9	Nikolas Maes (BEL)	Omega Pharma–Quick-Step	+ 0"
10	Steele Von Hoff (AUS)	Garmin–Sharp	+ 0"

General Classification after Stage 4

	Rider	Team	Time
1	Petr Vakoč (CZE)	Omega Pharma–Quick-Step	20h 34' 24"
2	Matthias Krizek (AUT)	Cannondale	+ 26"
3	Yauheni Hutarovich (BLR)	Ag2r–La Mondiale	+ 27"
4	Theo Bos (NED)	Belkin Pro Cycling	+ 27"
5	Luka Mezgec (SLO)	Giant–Shimano	+ 27"
6	Jonas van Genechten (BEL)	Lotto–Belisol	+ 27"
7	Roman Maikin (RUS)	RusVelo	+ 31"
8	Boris Vallée (BEL)	Lotto–Belisol	+ 33"
9	Manuele Mori (ITA)	Lampre–Merida	+ 33"
10	Maciej Paterski (POL)	CCC–Polsat–Polkowice	+ 35"

=== Stage 5 ===
Stage 5 profile

7 August 2014 — Zakopane to Štrbské Pleso (Slovakia), 190 km (118.1 mi)

The first stage to enter the mountains was also the first time the Tour visited Slovakia. Only 20 kilometres (12 miles) of the 190 kilometres (120 miles) was held in Poland, the rest being held in the Slovakian High Tatras. On the parcours were 5 categorised climbs – a second category ascent in Huty, a third category ascent in Východná and three first category ascents in Štrbské Pleso, a climb 7.5-kilometre (4.7-mile) long averaging 5% and reaching a maximum of 5.9%. Two of the ascents were part of a 25.4-kilometre (15.8-mile) loop around Štrbské Pleso. On the last loop, the race deviated slightly for the last kilometre, climbing to an altitude of 1,313 metres (4,308 ft). There were also two intermediate sprints, located in Liptovský Mikuláš and Liptovský Hrádok, as well as a special sprint in Suchá Hora, just across the Slovakian border. This stage was expected to turn the general classification around as the sprinters were expected to lose time and be replaced in the top 10 by climbers.

Unlike the previous stages, the break was formed just before reaching the Slovakian border, with eight riders making it into the breakaway. Team Poland's Paweł Bernas won the special sprint in Suchá Hora before the breakaway's lead topping four minutes. Later, Bernas also took both intermediate sprints, gaining six bonus seconds for the general classification. Former mountains classification leader Maciej Paterski of CCC–Polsat–Polkowice was in the breakaway, and he took full points at the climbs in Huty and Východná, as well as the first climb in Štrbské Pleso, in an attempt to regain the fuchsia jersey, in which he ultimately succeeded. Paterski and BMC Racing Team's Sebastian Lander attacked on the descent from the first category mountain, however they were soon caught by the rest of the breakaway which was extended to 16 riders. Christian Meier of Orica–GreenEDGE took full points at the second ascent of Štrbské Pleso before the group were caught.

Multiple solo attacks were attempted on the final climb, however none of these were successful. Towards the end, leader Petr Vakoč fell out of the peloton and started to lose time. The reduced peloton was prepared for a sprint finish which, to the delight of the home fans, was won by Rafał Majka, fresh from his win in the mountains classification in the Tour de France. Due to time bonuses, Majka advanced to 2nd place, one second behind Vakoč. Beñat Intxausti finished 2nd, ahead of teammate Ion Izagirre; they also advanced to 3rd and 4th overall, 5 and 7 seconds behind Vakoč respectively.

Stage 5 Result

	Rider	Team	Time
1	Rafał Majka (POL)	Tinkoff–Saxo	4h 30' 38"
2	Beñat Intxausti (ESP)	Movistar Team	+ 0"
3	Ion Izagirre (ESP)	Movistar Team	+ 0"
4	Gianluca Brambilla (ITA)	Omega Pharma–Quick-Step	+ 0"
5	Warren Barguil (FRA)	Giant–Shimano	+ 0"
6	Samuel Sánchez (ESP)	BMC Racing Team	+ 0"
7	Davide Formolo (ITA)	Cannondale	+ 0"
8	Lars Petter Nordhaug (NOR)	Belkin Pro Cycling	+ 0"
9	Andrey Amador (CRC)	Movistar Team	+ 0"
10	Przemysław Niemiec (POL)	Lampre–Merida	+ 0"

General Classification after Stage 5

	Rider	Team	Time
1	Petr Vakoč (CZE)	Omega Pharma–Quick-Step	25h 05' 28"
2	Rafał Majka (POL)	Tinkoff–Saxo	+ 1"
3	Beñat Intxausti (ESP)	Movistar Team	+ 5"
4	Ion Izagirre (ESP)	Movistar Team	+ 7"
5	Davide Formolo (ITA)	Cannondale	+ 11"
6	Giampaolo Caruso (ITA)	Team Katusha	+ 11"
7	Marek Rutkiewicz (POL)	CCC–Polsat–Polkowice	+ 11"
8	Peter Velits (SVK)	BMC Racing Team	+ 11"
9	Andrey Amador (CRC)	Movistar Team	+ 11"
10	Robert Gesink (NED)	Belkin Pro Cycling	+ 11"

=== Stage 6 ===
Stage 6 profile

8 August 2014 — Terma Bukowina Tatrzańska to Bukowina Tatrzańska, 174 km (108.1 mi)

As was customary in the previous editions of the race, the queen stage of the 2014 Tour de Pologne was a circuit race around Bukowina Tatrzańska. To make up the parcours of 174 kilometres (108 miles), the peloton first completed a 5-kilometre (3.1-mile) ride to Zakopane, three 5.3-kilometre (3.3-mile) loops around Zakopane on which were two special sprints, a return 5-kilometre (3.1-mile) ride before entering a 38.4-kilometre (23.9-mile) loop to be completed four times. Each loop featured three climbs – a first category ascent to Ząb, with gradients reaching 11.5%, a first category ascent to Gliczarów Górny, with gradients reaching 21.5% and the final, uncategorised ascent to Bukowina Tatrzańska. In total, the riders completed nearly 4,000 metres (13,000 ft) of climbing during the stage.

The day's breakaway was formed on the first ascent of Ząb and featured eight riders. Amongst them was Maciej Paterski of CCC–Polsat–Polkowice, who won five of the first six mountain climbs, in order to ensure a win in the fuchsia jersey. The eight riders built an advantage that reached a maximum of four minutes. However, because of the tempo set by Tinkoff–Saxo in the peloton, they were caught on the last climb of Gliczarów Górny, which offered double points for the mountains classification.

Rafał Majka, who was second overall, attacked at the same time, and took a group of 10–15 riders with him. Leader Petr Vakoč fell back on the last climb to the finish, thus almost ensuring he would lose the yellow jersey. Majka attacked once again with 2 kilometres (1.2 miles) to go and ultimately won the stage, his second in a row, in order to take the yellow jersey from Vakoč. For the second day running, Beñat Intxausti finished 2nd, ahead of Ion Izagirre. The duo also rose to 2nd and 3rd in the general classification, 18 and 22 seconds behind Majka respectively, ahead of the final time trial.

Stage 6 Result

	Rider	Team	Time
1	Rafał Majka (POL)	Tinkoff–Saxo	4h 40' 58"
2	Beñat Intxausti (ESP)	Movistar Team	+ 10"
3	Ion Izagirre (ESP)	Movistar Team	+ 10"
4	Christophe Riblon (FRA)	Ag2r–La Mondiale	+ 19"
5	Przemysław Niemiec (POL)	Lampre–Merida	+ 20"
6	Wout Poels (NED)	Omega Pharma–Quick-Step	+ 20"
7	Warren Barguil (FRA)	Giant–Shimano	+ 20"
8	Robert Gesink (NED)	Belkin Pro Cycling	+ 20"
9	Giampaolo Caruso (ITA)	Team Katusha	+ 20"
10	Gianluca Brambilla (ITA)	Omega Pharma–Quick-Step	+ 26"

General Classification after Stage 6

	Rider	Team	Time
1	Rafał Majka (POL)	Tinkoff–Saxo	29h 46' 17"
2	Beñat Intxausti (ESP)	Movistar Team	+ 18"
3	Ion Izagirre (ESP)	Movistar Team	+ 22"
4	Christophe Riblon (FRA)	Ag2r–La Mondiale	+ 39"
5	Giampaolo Caruso (ITA)	Team Katusha	+ 40"
6	Robert Gesink (NED)	Belkin Pro Cycling	+ 40"
7	Warren Barguil (FRA)	Giant–Shimano	+ 40"
8	Przemysław Niemiec (POL)	Lampre–Merida	+ 40"
9	Gianluca Brambilla (ITA)	Omega Pharma–Quick-Step	+ 46"
10	Marek Rutkiewicz (POL)	CCC–Polsat–Polkowice	+ 47"

=== Stage 7 ===
Stage 7 profile

9 August 2014 — Kraków to Kraków, 25 km (15.5 mi), individual time trial (ITT)

Like the previous year, the last stage was an intermediate time trial, starting and finishing in Kraków. For the first half of the race, the peloton headed south-east, before completing a U-turn in Wieliczka and heading north-west back to Kraków. It was expected that the general classification would be settled on this stage, however time trialists were expected to come first. As was customary of time trial stages, cyclists set off in reverse order from where they were ranked in the general classification at the end of the previous stage. Thus, Jack Bobridge of Belkin Pro Cycling, who, in 137th place, trailed overall leader Rafał Majka (Tinkoff–Saxo) by one hour, forty-four minutes and thirty-nine seconds, was the first rider to set off on the stage.

Bobridge set a time of 31' 10", but that was soon to be beaten by Rick Flens, who was 12 seconds faster, before both were beaten by CCC–Polsat–Polkowice's Mateusz Taciak, with a time of 29' 57". Taciak held on for almost an hour and was beaten by Adriano Malori, who recorded 29' 21". However, it was the Belgian Time Trial National Champion Kristof Vandewalle who won the stage for Trek Factory Racing in a time of 29' 18". With the stage being decided, the focus for the stage shifted towards the battle for the general classification and the overall victory.

Robert Gesink, sixth before the stage, dropped to eighth, being overtaken by Andrey Amador and Philip Deignan, who both recorded better times than Gesink. Lampre–Merida's Przemysław Niemiec, meanwhile, was 31st in the time-trial, good enough to move him to fifth – a climb from eighth. Fourth placed Christophe Riblon managed to defend his position with a time of 29' 56", the ninth-best time of the day. Out of the top three, Majka was judged to be the weakest time trialist but had a lead on 18 seconds over Beñat Intxausti and 22 seconds over Ion Izagirre. Izagirre went first and recorded a time of 29' 47", fourth on the stage and the best from any rider in the top five. Intxausti, meanwhile, only recorded 30' 05" whilst leader Majka stopped the clock in 30' 01". Therefore, he gained four seconds over Intxausti but lost fourteen to Izagirre. Still, this was good enough for him to take his first victory in a UCI World Tour race, to the delght of the home fans – he won the mountains classification in the Tour de France a mere two weeks before and was 6th in the Giro d'Italia earlier in the season. Izagirre, meanwhile, overtook his countryman Intxausti to come second, with Intxausti completing the podium.

Stage 7 Result

	Rider	Team	Time
1	Kristof Vandewalle (BEL)	Trek Factory Racing	29' 18"
2	Adriano Malori (ITA)	Movistar Team	+ 3"
3	Steve Cummings (GBR)	BMC Racing Team	+ 10"
4	Steve Morabito (SUI)	BMC Racing Team	+ 20"
5	Gorka Izagirre (ESP)	Movistar Team	+ 22"
6	Dario Cataldo (ITA)	Team Sky	+ 28"
7	Ion Izagirre (ESP)	Movistar Team	+ 29"
8	Bob Jungels (LUX)	Trek Factory Racing	+ 34"
9	Christophe Riblon (FRA)	Ag2r–La Mondiale	+ 38"
10	Michael Matthews (AUS)	Orica–GreenEDGE	+ 38"

Final General Classification

	Rider	Team	Time
1	Rafał Majka (POL)	Tinkoff–Saxo	30h 16' 18"
2	Ion Izagirre (ESP)	Movistar Team	+ 8"
3	Beñat Intxausti (ESP)	Movistar Team	+ 22"
4	Christophe Riblon (FRA)	Ag2r–La Mondiale	+ 34"
5	Przemysław Niemiec (POL)	Lampre–Merida	+ 1' 20"
6	Andrey Amador (CRC)	Movistar Team	+ 1' 21"
7	Philip Deignan (IRL)	Team Sky	+ 1' 24"
8	Robert Gesink (NED)	Belkin Pro Cycling	+ 1' 41"
9	Dominik Nerz (GER)	BMC Racing Team	+ 1' 42"
10	Petr Vakoč (CZE)	Omega Pharma–Quick-Step	+ 1' 49"

== Classification leadership table ==
Stage	Winner	General classification	Mountains classification	Points classification	Most active rider classification	Teams classification
1	Yauheni Hutarovich	Yauheni Hutarovich	Maciej Paterski	Yauheni Hutarovich	Jimmy Engoulvent	Omega Pharma–Quick-Step
2	Petr Vakoč	Petr Vakoč	Maciej Paterski	Yauheni Hutarovich	Petr Vakoč	Omega Pharma–Quick-Step
3	Theo Bos	Petr Vakoč	Maciej Paterski	Yauheni Hutarovich	Petr Vakoč	Omega Pharma–Quick-Step
4	Jonas van Genechten	Petr Vakoč	Mateusz Taciak	Yauheni Hutarovich	Matthias Krizek	Omega Pharma–Quick-Step
5	Rafał Majka	Petr Vakoč	Maciej Paterski	Yauheni Hutarovich	Matthias Krizek	Movistar Team
6	Rafał Majka	Rafał Majka	Maciej Paterski	Yauheni Hutarovich	Matthias Krizek	Movistar Team
7	Kristof Vandewalle	Rafał Majka	Maciej Paterski	Yauheni Hutarovich	Matthias Krizek	Movistar Team
Final		Rafał Majka	Maciej Paterski	Yauheni Hutarovich	Matthias Krizek	Movistar Team

Notes

- In stage 2, Roman Maikin, who was second in the points classification, wore the white jersey, because Yauheni Hutarovich (in first place) wore the yellow jersey as leader of the general classification during that stage.
- In stages 3 and 4, Jimmy Engoulvent, who was second in the most active rider classification, wore the blue jersey, because Petr Vakoč (in first place) wore the yellow jersey as leader of the general classification during those stages.
