= Antoine Warnier =

Belgian cyclist

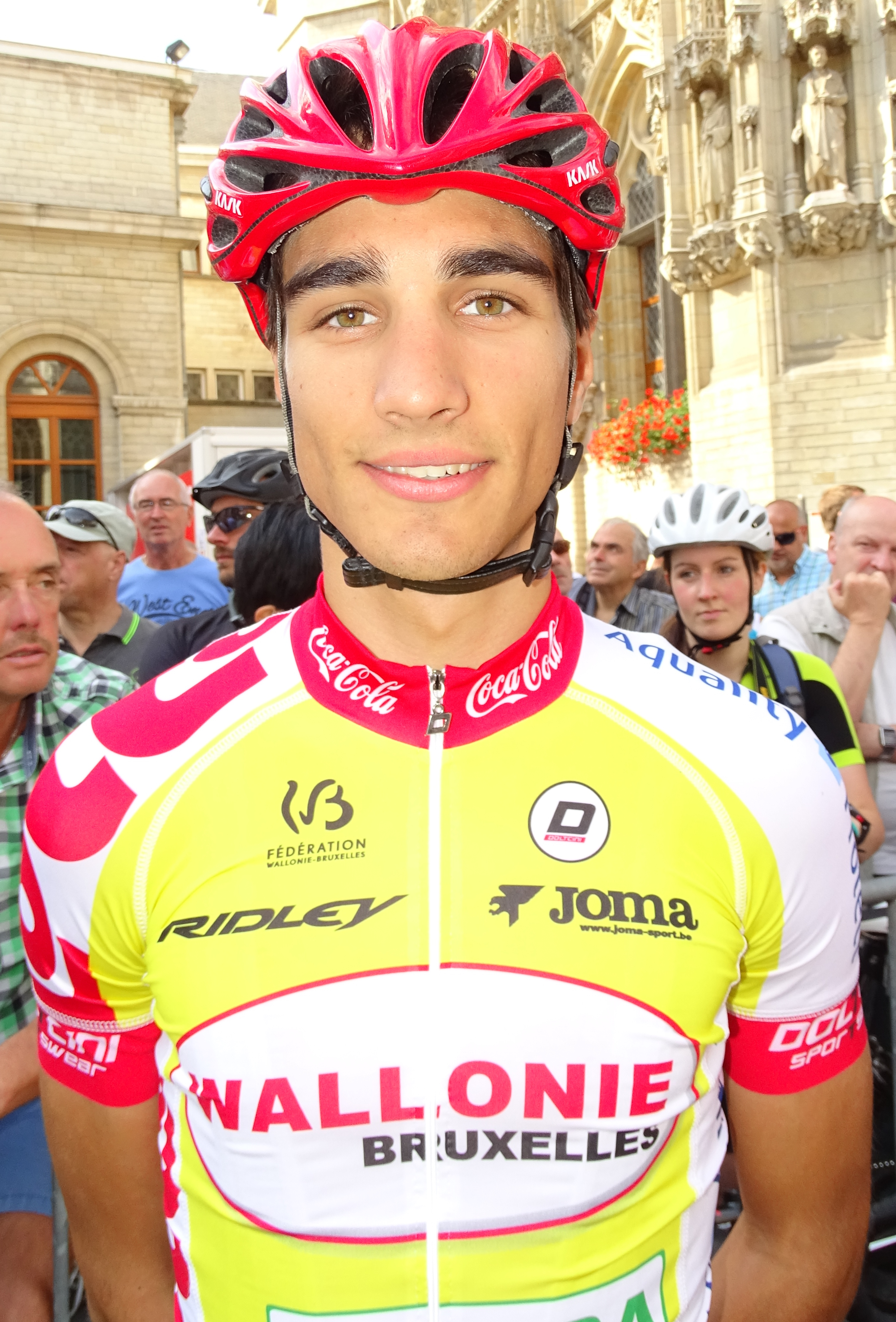
- Warnier in 2015.

Personal information
- Full name: Antoine Warnier
- Born: 24 June 1993 (age 33) Rocourt, Belgium
- Height: 1.83 m (6 ft 0 in)
- Weight: 71 kg (157 lb)

Cycling career
- Sport: Cycling
- Current team: Retired
- Discipline: Road
- Role: Rider

Amateur teams
- 2012: UC Seraing Crabbé Performance
- 2019–2020: Crabbé–CC Chevigny

Professional teams
- 2013–2014: Color Code–Biowanze
- 2015–2018: Wallonie-Bruxelles

Antoine Warnier (born 24 June 1993) is a Belgian former professional road bicycle racer, who rode professionally between 2013 and 2018 for the Color Code–Biowanze and WB Aqua Protect Veranclassic teams.

== Career ==
Warnier held the mountain jersey for two days at the 2015 Tour de Wallonie. The following year, Warnier held the mountain jersey for one day and the youth jersey for two days at the 2016 Tour de Wallonie. In 2017, he competed in Liège–Bastogne–Liège, finishing in 119th place.

== Major results ==
2014
4th Grand Prix de la Ville de Lillers
5th Paris–Tours Espoirs
6th Overall Carpathian Couriers Race
9th Piccolo Giro di Lombardia
2015
5th Overall Tour de Wallonie
7th Overall Paris–Arras Tour

1st Young rider classification

2017
4th Volta Limburg Classic
5th Grand Prix de la ville de Nogent-sur-Oise
10th Grand Prix de la Ville de Lillers
2018
7th Volta Limburg Classic
