= Loïc Vliegen =

Belgian road cyclist (born 1993)

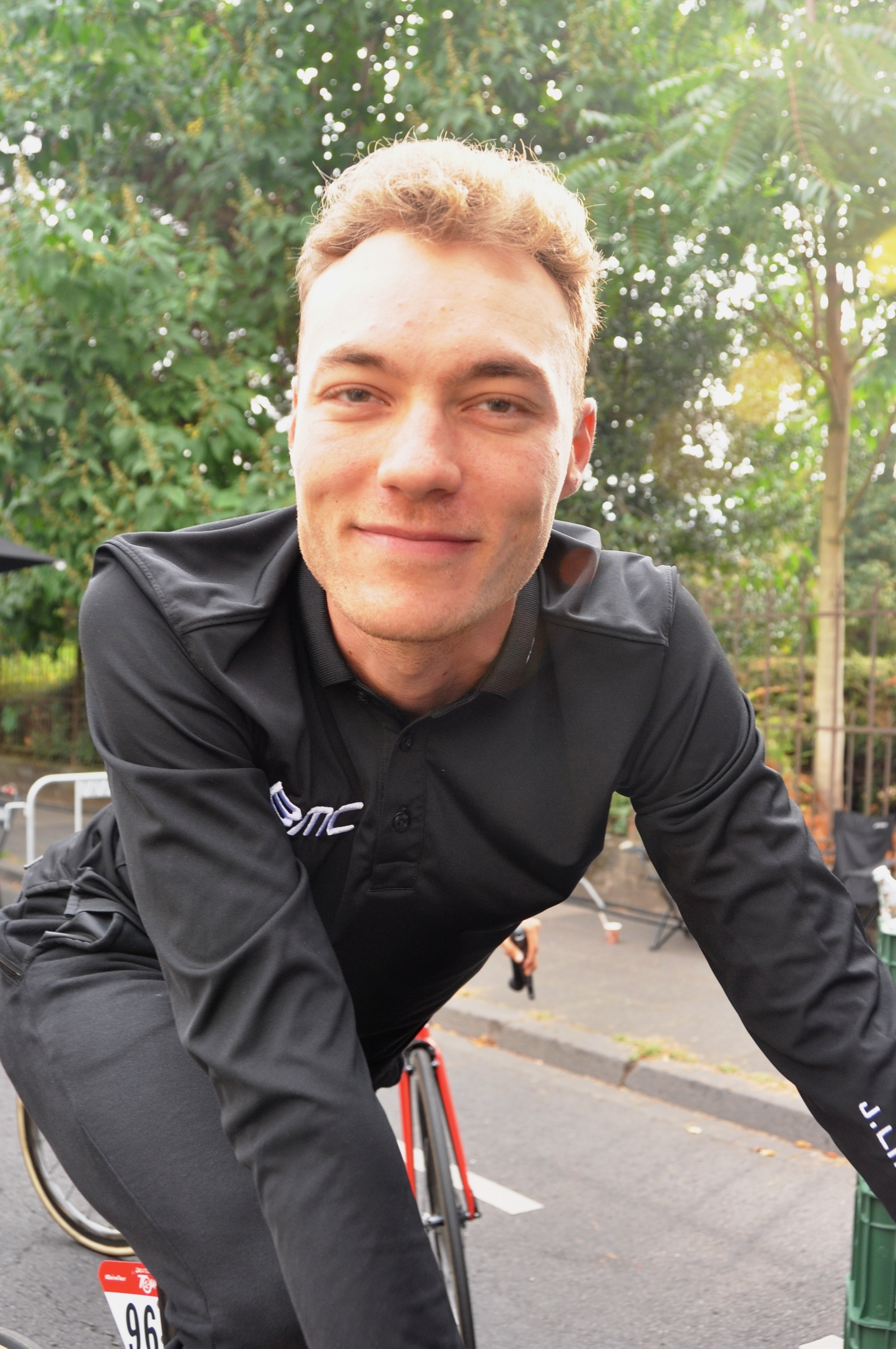
- Vliegen at the 2018 Deutschland Tour

Personal information
- Full name: Loïc Vliegen
- Born: 20 December 1993 (age 32) Rocourt, Wallonia, Belgium
- Height: 1.83 m (6 ft 0 in)
- Weight: 66 kg (146 lb; 10.4 st)

Cycling career
- Sport: Cycling
- Current team: Wagner Bazin WB
- Discipline: Road
- Role: Rider

Amateur teams
- 2013–2015: BMC Development Team
- 2014: BMC Racing Team (stagiaire)

Professional teams
- 2012: Idemasport–Biowanze
- 2015–2018: BMC Racing Team
- 2019–2020: Wanty–Gobert
- 2021–2023: Intermarché–Wanty–Gobert Matériaux
- 2024–: Bingoal WB

Major wins
- Grand Tours Vuelta a España 1 TTT stage (2017) Stage races Tour de Wallonie (2019)

Loïc Vliegen (born 20 December 1993 in Rocourt) is a Belgian cyclist, who currently rides for UCI ProTeam Wagner Bazin WB. He was named in the startlist for the 2017 Vuelta a España. In May 2018, he was named in the startlist for the Giro d'Italia.

== Major results ==
2011
3rd Road race, UEC European Junior Road Championships
2012
5th La Roue Tourangelle
6th Giro del Belvedere
2013
5th Flèche Ardennaise
7th Internationale Wielertrofee Jong Maar Moedig
9th Liège–Bastogne–Liège Espoirs
2014
1st Overall Triptyque Ardennais

1st Stage 1

2nd Flèche Ardennaise
2nd Internationale Wielertrofee Jong Maar Moedig
4th Liège–Bastogne–Liège Espoirs
7th London–Surrey Classic
7th Piccolo Giro di Lombardia
8th Overall Arctic Race of Norway
8th Omloop Het Nieuwsblad U23
2015
1st Flèche Ardennaise
1st Stage 3 Tour des Pays de Savoie
2nd Overall Tour de Bretagne

1st Young rider classification
1st Stage 7

2nd Overall Course de la Paix U23

1st Stage 3

5th Trofeo Banca Popolare di Vicenza
5th Liège–Bastogne–Liège Espoirs
7th Internationale Wielertrofee Jong Maar Moedig
8th Overall Tour de Wallonie
8th Giro del Belvedere
10th Kattekoers
2016
1st Mountains classification, Three Days of De Panne
4th Le Samyn
9th Amstel Gold Race
9th Volta Limburg Classic
10th Brabantse Pijl
2017
1st Stage 1 (TTT) Vuelta a España
9th Overall Tour de Wallonie
9th Volta Limburg Classic
10th Grand Prix Pino Cerami
10th Grand Prix de Wallonie
2018
5th Overall Dubai Tour
2019
1st Overall Tour de Wallonie

1st Stage 2

4th Dwars door het Hageland
5th Tokyo 2020 Test Event
8th Overall Tour of Belgium
2020
1st Tour du Doubs
6th Trofeo Serra de Tramuntana
8th Pollença–Andratx
2022
2nd Overall Tour de Wallonie
3rd Clásica Jaén Paraíso Interior
3rd Volta Limburg Classic
5th Dwars door het Hageland
5th Vuelta a Murcia
5th Le Samyn
2023
6th Dwars door het Hageland
8th Vuelta a Murcia

=== Grand Tour general classification results timeline ===
| Grand Tour | 2017 | 2018 | 2019 | 2020 | 2021 | 2022 |
|---|---|---|---|---|---|---|
| Giro d'Italia | — | DNF | — | — | — | DNF |
| Tour de France | — | — | — | — | DNF | — |
| Vuelta a España | 112 | — | — | — | — | — |

Legend
| — | Did not compete |
| DNF | Did not finish |
