= Thomas Deruette =

Belgian cyclist

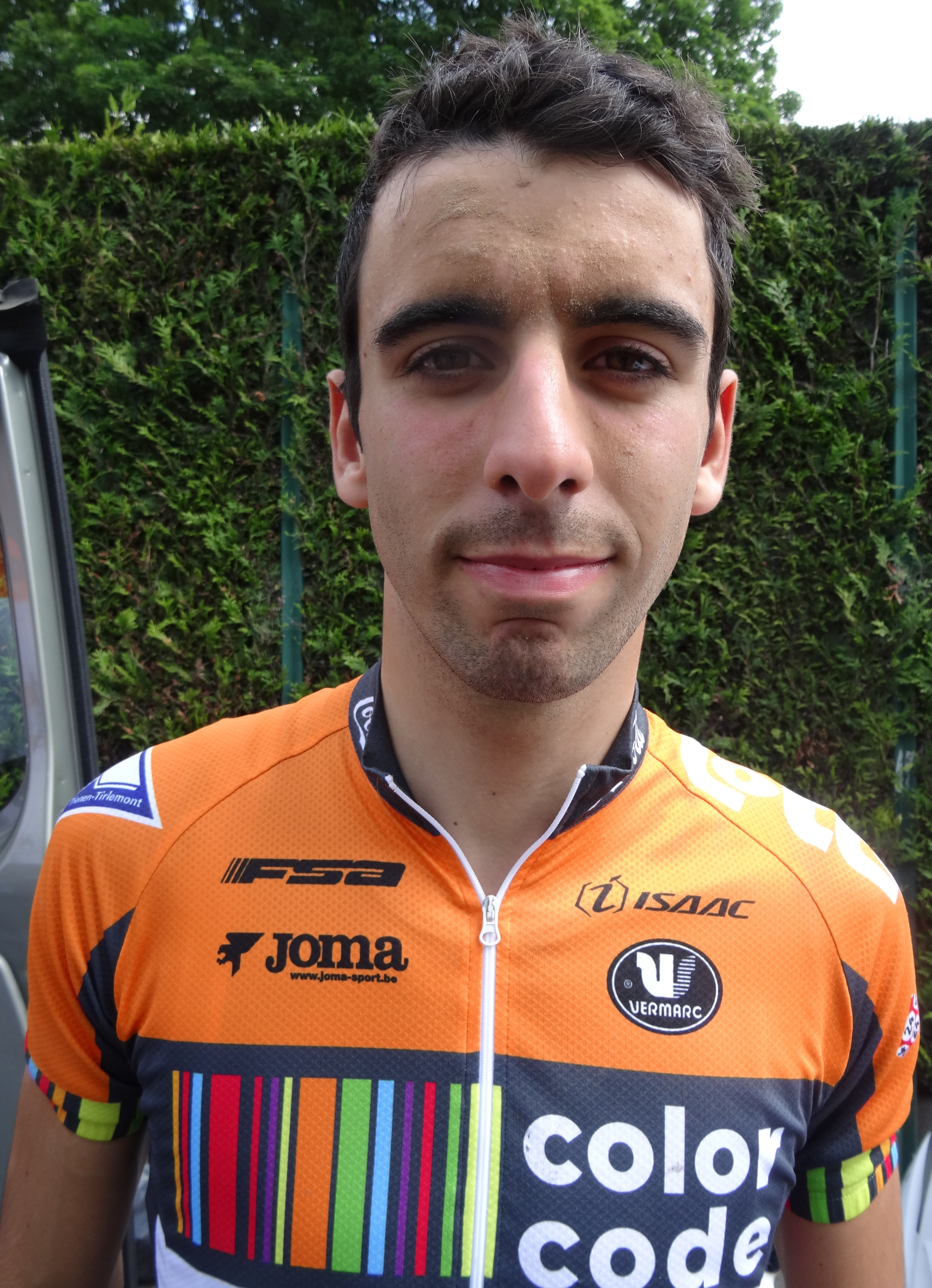
- Deruette in 2014

Personal information
- Full name: Thomas Deruette
- Born: 6 July 1995 (age 31) Saint-Mard, Gaume, Belgium
- Height: 1.82 m (6 ft 0 in)
- Weight: 70 kg (154 lb)

Cycling career
- Sport: Cycling
- Current team: Retired
- Discipline: Road
- Role: Rider

Amateur teams
- 2012: SCV Marchovelette
- 2013: VC Ardennes

Professional teams
- 2014: Color Code–Biowanze
- 2015: Differdange–Losch
- 2016–2018: Wallonie-Bruxelles–Group Protect
- 2019: Team Differdange–Geba

Thomas Deruette (born 6 July 1995) is a Belgian former professional road bicycle racer, who rode professionally between 2014 and 2019.

He held the mountain jersey for two days at the 2016 Tour de Luxembourg, and he also held the mountain jersey for two days at the 2016 Tour de Wallonie. He competed in the 2017 Liège–Bastogne–Liège, but did not finish.
