= Ludwig De Winter =

Belgian cyclist

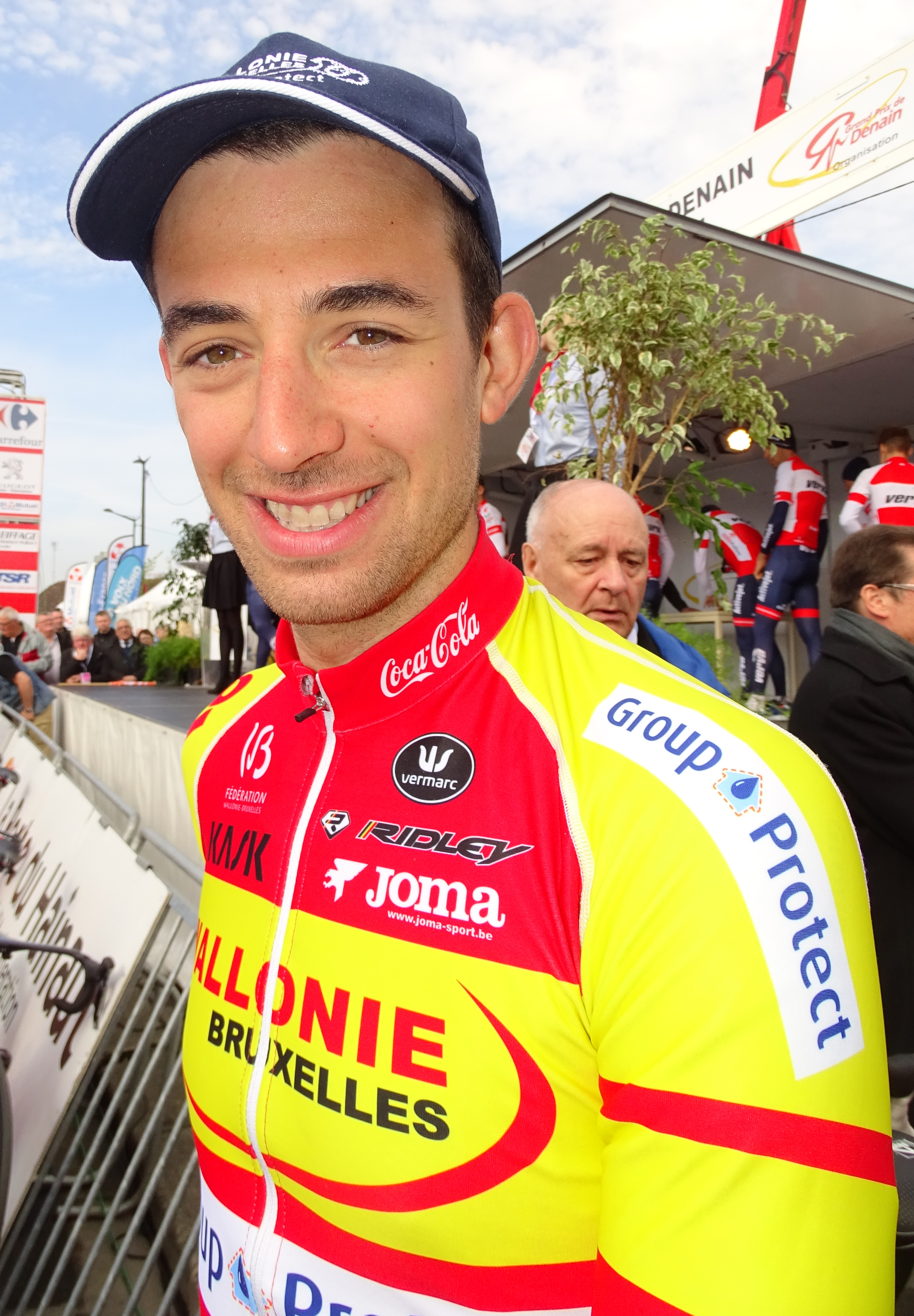
- De Winter in 2016.

Personal information
- Full name: Ludwig De Winter
- Nickname: Lulu
- Born: 31 December 1992 (age 33) La Louvière, Belgium
- Height: 1.87 m (6 ft 2 in)
- Weight: 80 kg (176 lb)

Cycling career
- Sport: Cycling
- Current team: Intermarché–Wanty
- Discipline: Road
- Role: Rider
- Rider type: Breakaway specialist Cobbled classics specialist

Amateur teams
- 2005: Crazy Bikers
- 2006–2007: Optique Lauwerys
- 2010–2012: Verandas Willems–CC Chevigny
- 2013–2014: Color Code–Biowanze

Professional teams
- 2015–2018: Wallonie-Bruxelles
- 2019–2020: Wanty–Gobert
- 2021: Intermarché–Wanty–Gobert Matériaux

Ludwig De Winter (born 31 December 1992 in La Louvière) is a Belgian former cyclist, who last rode for UCI WorldTeam Intermarché–Wanty–Gobert Matériaux. He turned professional in 2015, and achieved a ninth-place finish in Binche–Chimay–Binche that year. He was also part of the Wanty–Gobert team that helped Loïc Vliegen to victory in the 2019 Tour de Wallonie. An inhabitant of Binche, he retired at the age of 28 after the 2021 edition of Binche–Chimay–Binche.

== Major results ==
2013
9th Eschborn–Frankfurt Under–23
2014
7th Circuit de Wallonie
8th Grote Prijs Stad Zottegem
2015
1st Mountains classification Tour de Wallonie
9th Binche–Chimay–Binche
2016
10th Schaal Sels
2017
4th GP Paul Borremans Viane-Geraardsbergen
6th Schaal Sels
8th Grote Prijs Marcel Kint
9th De Kustpijl
10th Dwars door de Vlaamse Ardennen
