= Dries Devenyns =

Belgian road bicycle racer

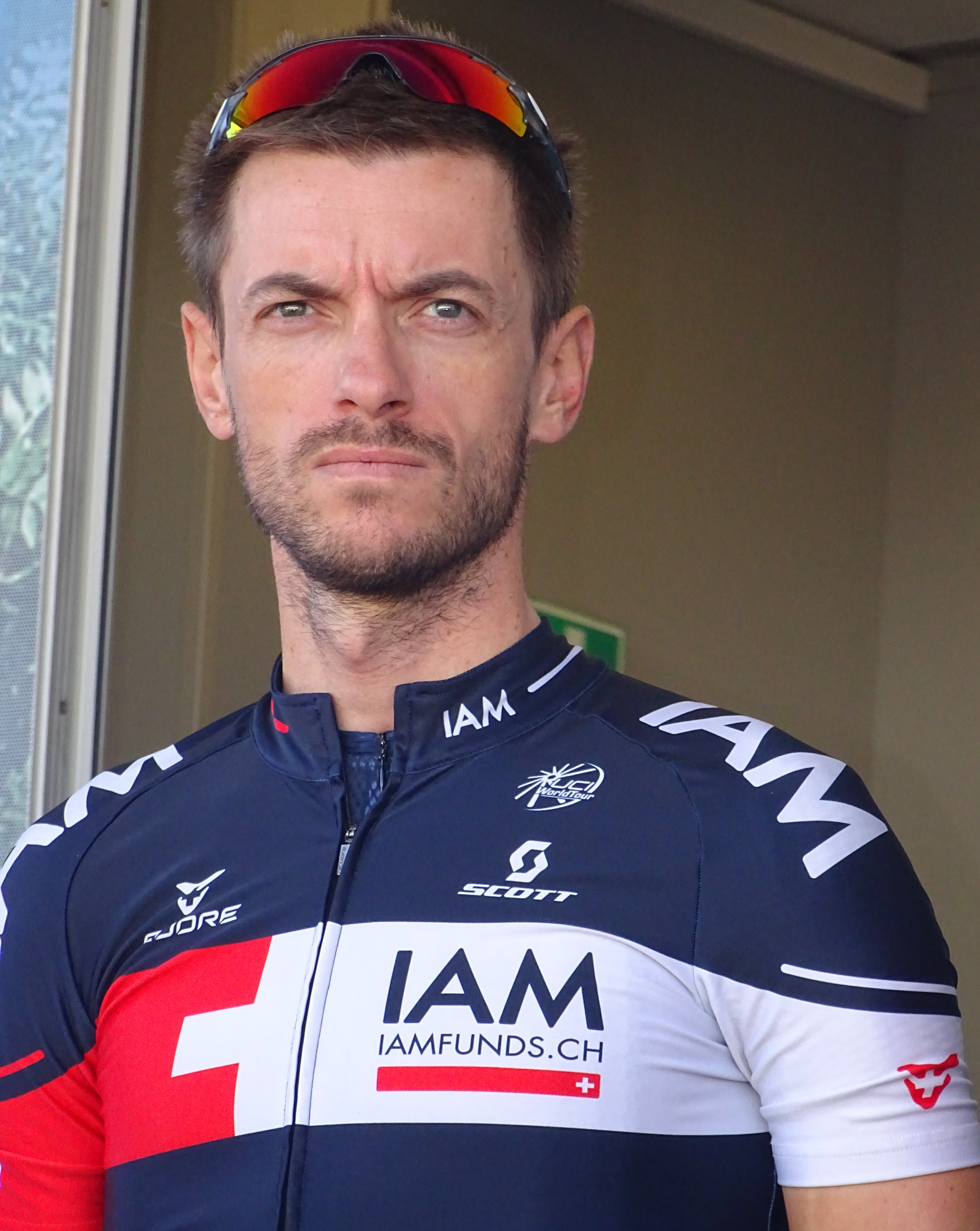
- Devenyns in 2015.

Personal information
- Full name: Dries Devenyns
- Born: 22 July 1983 (age 43) Leuven, Belgium
- Height: 1.77 m (5 ft 9 1/2 in)
- Weight: 65 kg (143 lb; 10 st 3 lb)

Cycling career
- Sport: Cycling
- Current team: Soudal–Quick-Step
- Discipline: Road
- Role: Rider
- Rider type: Puncheur; Domestique

Amateur team
- 2006: Davitamon–Lotto (stagiaire)

Professional teams
- 2007–2008: Predictor–Lotto
- 2009–2013: Quick-Step
- 2014: Giant–Shimano
- 2015–2016: IAM Cycling
- 2017–2023: Quick-Step Floors

Major wins
- Stage races Tour of Belgium (2016) Tour de Wallonie (2016) One-day races and Classics Great Ocean Road Race (2020)

Dries Devenyns (born 22 July 1983) is a Belgian retired road bicycle racer, who rode for UCI WorldTeam Soudal–Quick-Step. He retired at the end of 2023.

== Career ==
Devenyns left Omega Pharma–Quick-Step at the end of the 2013 season, after five seasons with the squad, and joined Giant-Shimano for 2014. He moved to the team IAM Cycling for the 2015 and 2016 seasons, and joined Quick-Step Floors in 2017, retiring in 2023.

== Major results ==
2005
1st Road race, National Under-23 Road Championships
2006
National Amateur Road Championships

1st Time trial
2nd Road race

1st Overall Tour de Bretagne

1st Young rider classification
1st Stages 4 & 5 (ITT)

4th Flèche Ardennaise
5th Overall Tour des Pyrénées

1st Prologue

8th De Vlaamse Pijl
10th Overall Le Triptyque des Monts et Châteaux
2008
8th Overall Tour of Turkey
8th Overall Ster Elektrotoer
10th Overall Delta Tour Zeeland
2009 (1 pro win)
1st Stage 5 Tour of Austria
5th Overall Tour du Poitou-Charentes
7th Overall Tour de Wallonie
9th Giro del Piemonte
2010
5th Giro del Piemonte
9th Overall Tour of the Basque Country
2011
4th Clásica de San Sebastián
6th Brabantse Pijl
7th Overall Tour of Oman
8th Overall Eneco Tour
10th Trofeo Mallorca
10th Trofeo Deià
2012
6th Grote Prijs Jef Scherens
8th Brabantse Pijl
2013
5th Overall Tour of Austria
10th Overall Tour de l'Ain
2014
8th Omloop Het Nieuwsblad
2015
6th Overall Tour de l'Eurométropole
10th Brabantse Pijl
2016 (5)
1st Overall Tour of Belgium

1st Stage 2

1st Overall Tour de Wallonie

1st Stage 5

1st Grand Prix La Marseillaise
6th Overall Étoile de Bessèges
10th Clásica de San Sebastián
2017
3rd Grand Prix Pino Cerami
5th Time trial, National Road Championships
7th Brabantse Pijl
2018
4th Cadel Evans Great Ocean Road Race
5th Overall Tour Down Under
6th Overall Tour of Oman
9th Overall Tour of Guangxi
2019
10th Overall Tour Down Under
2020 (1)
1st Cadel Evans Great Ocean Road Race
7th Gran Piemonte
10th Brabantse Pijl

=== Grand Tour general classification results timeline ===
Grand Tour	2008	2009	2010	2011	2012	2013	2014	2015	2016	2017	2018	2019	2020	2021	2022	2023
Giro d'Italia	117	95	—	—	—	—	—	—	—	89	—	—	—	—	—	—
Tour de France	—	—	144	46	68	—	DNF	—	—	—	—	97	90	135	—	119
/ Vuelta a España	—	—	—	—	—	—	—	—	101	—	94	—	—	—	—	

Legend
—	Did not compete
DNF	Did not finish
