= Vyacheslav Kuznetsov (cyclist) =

Russian cyclist

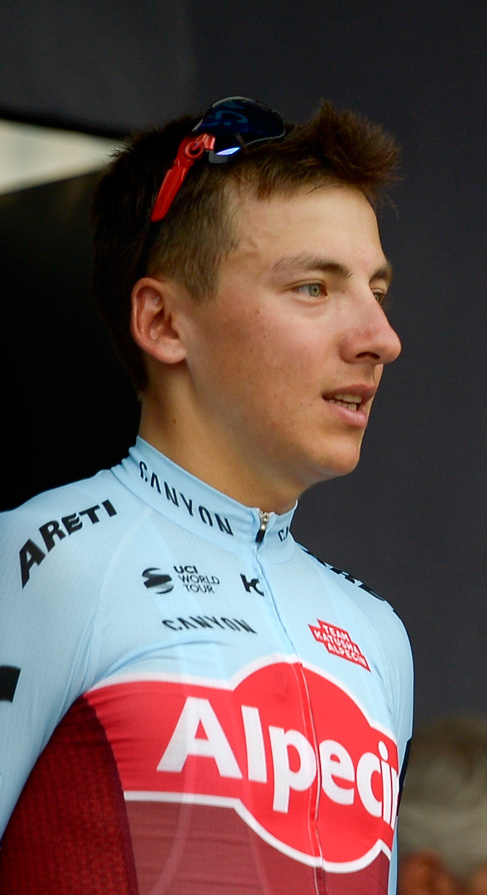
- Kuznetsov in 2018

Personal information
- Full name: Vyacheslav Gennadyevich Kuznetsov
- Born: 24 June 1989 (age 37) Togliatti, Russia
- Height: 1.84 m (6 ft 0 in)
- Weight: 70 kg (154 lb)

Cycling career
- Sport: Cycling
- Current team: Retired
- Discipline: Road
- Role: Rider
- Rider type: Classics rider

Amateur teams
- 2010–2012: Itera–Katusha
- 2012: Team Katusha (stagiaire)

Professional teams
- 2013–2019: Team Katusha
- 2020–2021: Gazprom–RusVelo

Vyacheslav Gennadyevich Kuznetsov (Russian: Вячесла́в Генна́дьевич Кузнецо́в; born 24 June 1989) is a Russian former professional cyclist, who rode professionally between 2013 and 2021 for the Team Katusha–Alpecin and Gazprom–RusVelo teams.

In 2010, he won La Côte Picarde, one of the events of the Nations Cup U23. He was named in the start list for the 2016 Giro d'Italia. In August 2019, he was named in the startlist for the 2019 Vuelta a España.

== Major results ==
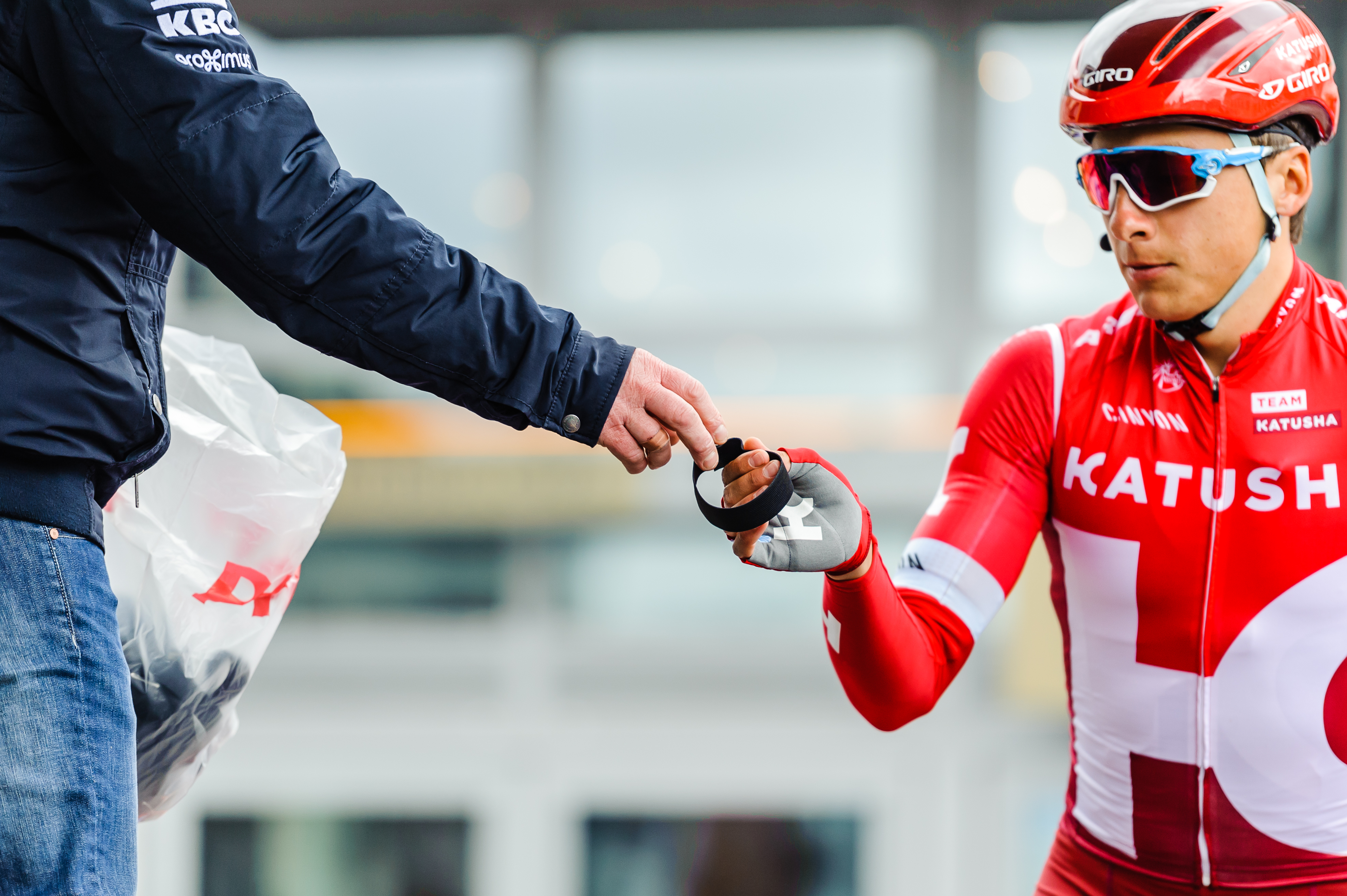
Kuznetsov at the 2016 Dwars door Vlaanderen

2008
8th Grand Prix of Moscow
2010
1st La Côte Picarde
5th Duo Normand (with Anton Vorobyev)
6th Textielprijs
10th Road race, UCI Under-23 Road World Championships
10th Trofeo Banca Popolare di Vicenza
2011
1st Road race, National Under-23 Road Championships
2nd Coppa della Pace
4th Overall Vuelta a la Comunidad de Madrid Under-23
5th Overall Tour of Yeroskipos
6th Omloop van het Waasland
9th Grand Prix de la Ville de Lillers
2012
1st La Roue Tourangelle
2nd Overall Ronde de l'Oise

1st Young rider classification
1st Stage 1

2nd Central European Tour Košice–Miskolc
2nd Ruota d'Oro
3rd Overall Circuit des Ardennes

1st Stage 3 (TTT)

3rd Mayor Cup
3rd Grand Prix des Marbriers
4th Overall Tour of Bulgaria

1st Stage 7

6th Overall Olympia's Tour
10th Duo Normand (with Pavel Kochetkov)
2014
7th Overall Tour de Wallonie
2015
4th Road race, National Road Championships
8th Overall Tour of Belgium
2016
3rd Overall Tour de Wallonie
3rd Gent–Wevelgem
9th Overall Tour of Qatar
2018
7th Overall Tour de Wallonie
7th Grand Prix Pino Cerami
2020
7th Paris–Camembert
10th Trofeo Felanitx-Ses Salines-Campos-Porreres

=== Grand Tour general classification results timeline ===
Grand Tour	2016	2017	2018	2019
Giro d'Italia	123	132	105	DNF
Tour de France	—	—	—	—
Vuelta a España	—	—	—	138

Legend
—	Did not compete
DNF	Did not finish
