= Xandro Meurisse =

Belgian cyclist

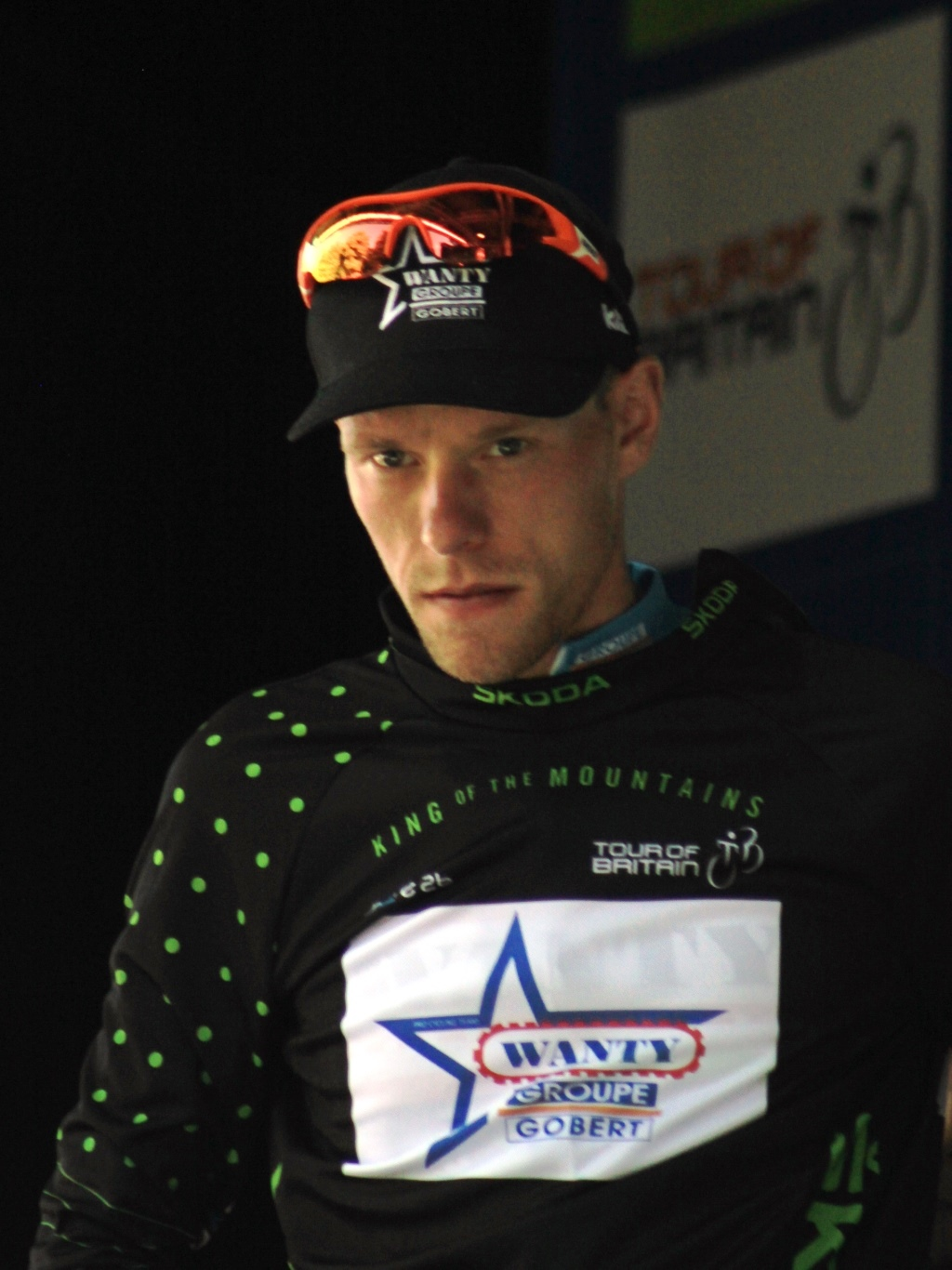
- Meurisse wearing the King of the Mountains jersey of the 2016 Tour of Britain.

Personal information
- Full name: Xandro Meurisse
- Born: 31 January 1992 (age 34) Kortrijk, Flanders, Belgium
- Height: 1.81 m (5 ft 11 in)
- Weight: 71 kg (157 lb)

Cycling career
- Sport: Cycling
- Current team: Alpecin–Premier Tech
- Discipline: Road
- Role: Rider
- Rider type: All-rounder

Amateur teams
- 2012: Soenens–Construkt Glas
- 2013–2014: Lotto–Belisol U23
- 2014: Lotto–Belisol (stagiaire)
- 2016: Wanty–Groupe Gobert (stagiaire)

Professional teams
- 2015: An Post–Chain Reaction
- 2016: Crelan–Vastgoedservice
- 2017–2020: Wanty–Groupe Gobert
- 2021–: Alpecin–Fenix

Xandro Meurisse (born 31 January 1992) is a Belgian cyclist, who currently rides for UCI WorldTeam Alpecin–Premier Tech.

Meurisse turned professional in 2015 with An Post–Chain Reaction. He had ridden as a stagiaire for Lotto–Belisol the previous season, also spending two years with their development team Lotto–Belisol U23. In May 2016, he took his first professional win on stage four of the Four Days of Dunkirk, while riding for UCI Continental team Crelan–Vastgoedservice. In 2017, he stepped up to the second division with Wanty–Groupe Gobert, after riding as a stagiaire for the team the previous fall. He won his first race with the team the year after at the Druivenkoers Overijse, having finished third in the previous edition. His first Grand Tour was the 2019 Tour de France, finishing in the top ten on the third, sixth and eighth stages. He next won the two-day 2020 Vuelta a Murcia after taking the first stage.

In 2021, he moved to Alpecin–Fenix, winning the Giro del Veneto, his final race of the season.

== Major results ==
2010
5th Ronde van Vlaanderen Juniors
2013
8th Overall Okolo Jižních Čech

1st Stage 4

2014
1st Stage 3 Triptyque Ardennais
3rd Dwars door de Vlaamse Ardennen
4th Memorial Van Coningsloo
7th Omloop Het Nieuwsblad U23
8th Internationale Wielertrofee Jong Maar Moedig
9th Circuit de Wallonie
2015
1st Mountains classification, Circuit des Ardennes
8th Overall Boucles de la Mayenne
10th Overall Tour of Britain
2016 (1 pro win)
3rd Overall Four Days of Dunkirk

1st Stage 4

5th Overall Driedaagse van West-Vlaanderen
5th Schaal Sels
7th Overall Tour of Britain

1st Mountains classification

7th Overall Circuit des Ardennes
7th Overall Tour de Wallonie
2017
2nd Overall Tour de Luxembourg

1st Young rider classification

2nd Volta Limburg Classic
2nd Dwars door de Vlaamse Ardennen
3rd Druivenkoers Overijse
6th Overall Circuit de la Sarthe
6th Famenne Ardenne Classic
7th Overall Tour de Wallonie
2018 (1)
1st Druivenkoers Overijse
2nd Overall Circuit de la Sarthe
4th Memorial Marco Pantani
5th Boucles de l'Aulne
6th Road race, UEC European Road Championships
6th Overall Four Days of Dunkirk
10th Grand Prix Pino Cerami
2019
5th Boucles de l'Aulne
2020 (2)
1st Overall Vuelta a Murcia

1st Points classification
1st Stage 1

10th Antwerp Port Epic
2021 (1)
1st Giro del Veneto
2022
3rd Overall Circuit de la Sarthe
3rd GP Industria & Artigianato
10th Brabantse Pijl
2023
5th Overall Tour de Wallonie
9th Overall Tour of Turkey
2024
2nd Giro del Veneto
3rd Veneto Classic
5th Overall Tour of Austria
5th Gran Piemonte
10th Giro di Lombardia
Combativity award Stage 11 Vuelta a España
2025
10th Clásica de San Sebastián

=== Grand Tour general classification results timeline ===
Grand Tour	2019	2020	2021	2022
Giro d'Italia	—	—	—	—
Tour de France	21	—	29	—
Vuelta a España	—	—	—	39

Legend
—	Did not compete
DNF	Did not finish
