= 2017 Volta Limburg Classic =

2017 UCI Europe Tour

Race details
- Dates: 1 April 2017
- Stages: 1
- Distance: 198.6 km (123.4 mi)
- Winning time: 4h 45' 26"

Results
	Winner	Marco Canola (ITA)	(Nippo–Vini Fantini)
	Second	Xandro Meurisse (BEL)	(Wanty–Groupe Gobert)
	Third	Nick van der Lijke (NED)	(Roompot–Nederlandse Loterij)

The 2017 Volta Limburg Classic was a one-day road cycling race that took place on 1 April 2017. It was the 44th edition of the Volta Limburg Classic and was rated as a 1.1 event as part of the 2017 UCI Europe Tour.

The race was won by Marco Canola (Nippo–Vini Fantini).

== Teams ==
Twenty-two teams were invited to take part in the race. These included two UCI WorldTeams, eight UCI Professional Continental teams and twelve UCI Continental teams.

UCI WorldTeams

- BMC Racing Team
- LottoNL–Jumbo

UCI Professional Continental Teams

- Bardiani–CSF
- CCC–Sprandi–Polkowice
- Gazprom–RusVelo
- Nippo–Vini Fantini
- Roompot–Nederlandse Loterij
- Sport Vlaanderen–Baloise
- Wanty–Groupe Gobert
- WB Veranclassic Aqua Protect

UCI Continental Teams

- Baby-Dump Cyclingteam
- Team Coop
- Delta Cycling Rotterdam
- Destil–Jo Piels
- Team Lotto–Kern Haus
- Metec–TKH
- Monkey Town Continental Team
- Pauwels Sauzen–Vastgoedservice
- Riwal Platform
- SEG Racing Academy
- Tarteletto–Isorex
- Team VéloCONCEPT

== Result ==
Result
Rank	Rider	Team	Time
1	Marco Canola (ITA)	Nippo–Vini Fantini	4h 45' 26"
2	Xandro Meurisse (BEL)	Wanty–Groupe Gobert	+ 0"
3	Nick van der Lijke (NED)	Roompot–Nederlandse Loterij	+ 4"
4	Antoine Warnier (BEL)	WB Veranclassic Aqua Protect	+ 51"
5	Paul Martens (GER)	LottoNL–Jumbo	+ 59"
6	Jeroen Meijers (NED)	Roompot–Nederlandse Loterij	+ 59"
7	Dimitri Peyskens (BEL)	WB Veranclassic Aqua Protect	+ 59"
8	Jérôme Baugnies (BEL)	Wanty–Groupe Gobert	+ 59"
9	Loïc Vliegen (BEL)	BMC Racing Team	+ 59"
10	Rob Ruijgh (NED)	Tarteletto–Isorex	+ 59"
