= Jonas van Genechten =

Belgian road cyclist

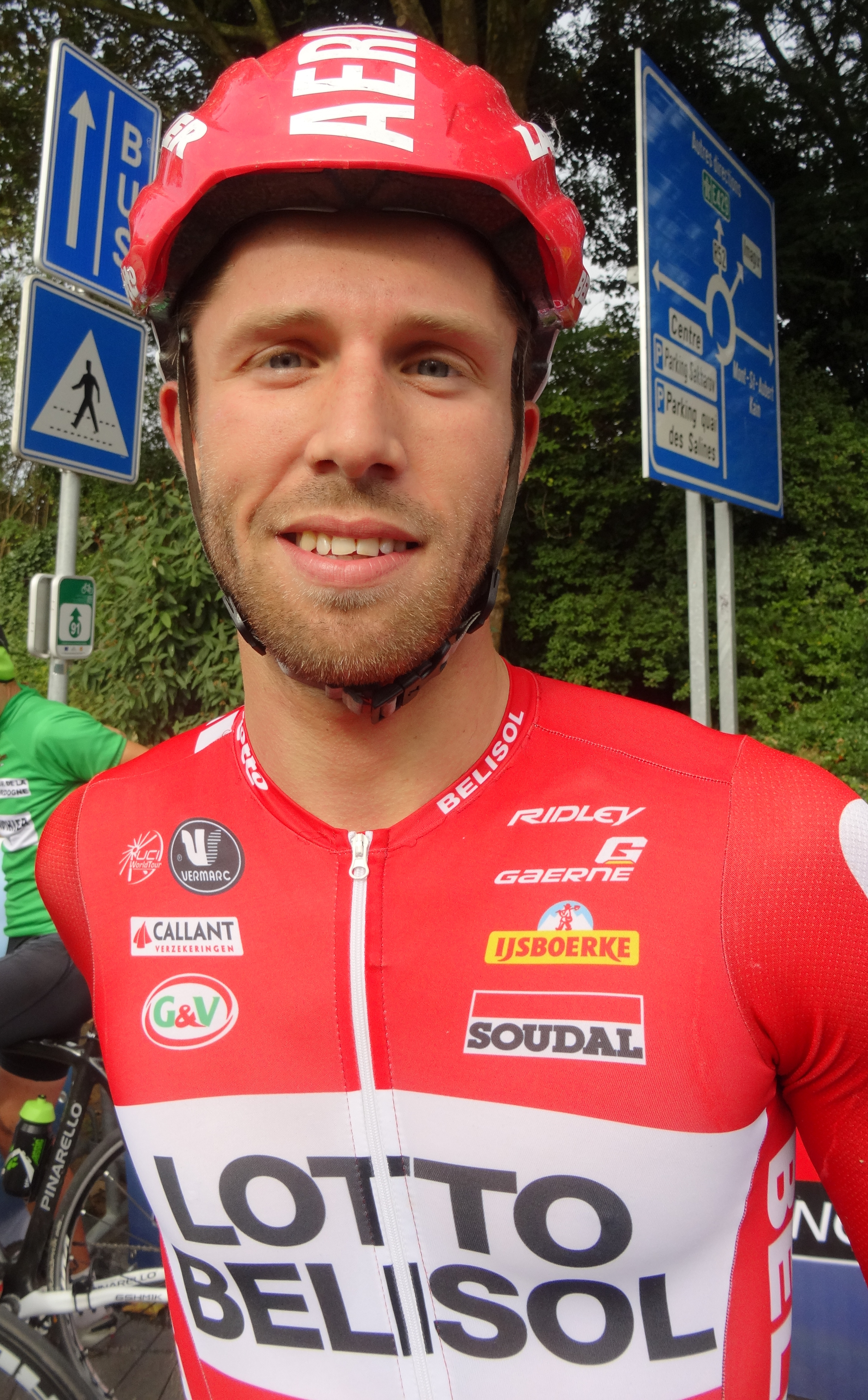
- Van Genechten in 2014

Personal information
- Full name: Jonas van Genechten
- Born: 16 September 1986 (age 40) Lobbes, Belgium
- Height: 1.76 m (5 ft 9 in)
- Weight: 67 kg (148 lb)

Cycling career
- Sport: Cycling
- Current team: Retired
- Discipline: Road
- Role: Rider

Amateur teams
- 2006: Team Wallonie
- 2007–2008: Storez–Ledecq Materiaux

Professional teams
- 2009–2010: Verandas Willems
- 2011: Wallonie Bruxelles–Crédit Agricole
- 2012–2014: Lotto–Belisol
- 2015–2016: IAM Cycling
- 2017: Cofidis
- 2018–2021: Vital Concept

Major wins
- Grand Tours Vuelta a España 1 individual stage (2016) Single-day races and Classics GP de Fourmies (2014)

Jonas van Genechten (born 16 September 1986) is a Belgian former professional road bicycle racer, who rode professionally between 2009 and 2021 for the Verandas Willems (2009–2010), Wallonie Bruxelles–Crédit Agricole (2011), Lotto–Belisol (2012–2014), IAM Cycling (2015–2016), Cofidis (2017) and B&B Hotels p/b KTM (2018–2021) teams. During his professional career, he took eight victories, including the seventh stage at the 2016 Vuelta a España.

== Major results ==
2007
1st Stage 1 Tour du Haut-Anjou
2008
2nd Druivenkoers Overijse
5th Grand Prix Criquielion
6th Paris–Mantes-en-Yvelines
8th Paris–Tours Espoirs
2009
6th Ronde van Noord-Holland
8th Kattekoers
8th Memorial Van Coningsloo
2010
3rd Grote Prijs Stad Zottegem
4th Dwars door het Hageland
7th Boucles de l'Aulne
8th Grote Prijs Stad Geel
2011
1st Kattekoers
2nd Grote Prijs Stad Geel
5th Kuurne–Brussels–Kuurne
6th Schaal Sels
7th De Vlaamse Pijl
10th Flèche Ardennaise
10th Nationale Sluitingsprijs
2012
3rd Grand Prix Pino Cerami
2013 (1 pro win)
1st Grand Prix Pino Cerami
4th Druivenkoers Overijse
10th Overall World Ports Classic
2014 (3)
1st Grand Prix de Fourmies
1st Druivenkoers Overijse
1st Stage 4 Tour de Pologne
2nd Grand Prix Pino Cerami
3rd Kampioenschap van Vlaanderen
3rd Nationale Sluitingsprijs
4th Overall Tour de l'Eurométropole
7th Binche–Chimay–Binche
2015 (2)
1st Stage 4 Tour de Wallonie
1st Stage 2 Tour de l'Eurométropole
4th Binche–Chimay–Binche
6th Grand Prix d'Isbergues
8th Halle–Ingooigem
2016 (1)
1st Stage 7 Vuelta a España
3rd Paris–Tours
6th Trofeo Felanitx–Ses Salines–Campos–Porreres
6th Trofeo Playa de Palma
9th Kuurne–Brussels–Kuurne
9th Binche–Chimay–Binche
2017
2nd Trofeo Felanitx–Ses Salines–Campos–Porreres
6th Route Adélie
10th Scheldeprijs
10th Clásica de Almería
2018 (1)
1st Omloop van het Houtland
2nd Grote Prijs Jef Scherens
6th Kampioenschap van Vlaanderen
7th Binche–Chimay–Binche
2019
6th Nokere Koerse
7th Three Days of Bruges–De Panne

=== Grand Tour general classification results timeline ===
Grand Tour	2016	2017
Giro d'Italia	—	—
Tour de France	—	—
Vuelta a España	144	DNF

Legend
—	Did not compete
DNF	Did not finish
