= 2016 Tour of Qatar =

UCI Asia Tour

Race details
- Dates: February 8, 2016–February 12, 2016
- Stages: 5
- Distance: 625 km (388 mi)
- Winning time: 13h 47' 23"

Results
Jersey awarded to the overall winner	Winner	Mark Cavendish (GBR)	(Team Dimension Data)
	Second	Alexander Kristoff (NOR)	(Team Katusha)
	Third	Greg Van Avermaet (BEL)	(BMC Racing Team)
Jersey awarded to the points classification winner	Points	Alexander Kristoff (NOR)	(Team Katusha)
Jersey awarded to the young rider classification winner	Young rider	Søren Kragh Andersen (DEN)	(Team Giant–Alpecin)
	Team	BMC Racing Team	

The 2016 Tour of Qatar was a road cycling stage race that took place in Qatar between 8 and 12 February 2016. It was organised by the Amaury Sport Organisation (ASO), the organisers of the Tour de France and was rated as a 2.HC event as part of the 2016 UCI Asia Tour. It was the 15th edition of the Tour of Qatar

The race consisted of five stages. It began in Dukhan and ended in Doha. The Tour of Qatar puts unusual demands on riders: it has no significant climbs, but almost every stage is affected by strong crosswinds. These conditions make the race ideal preparation for the spring classics season, so many prominent classics riders were present. The champion of the 2015 Tour of Qatar was Niki Terpstra (Etixx–Quick-Step), but his team was not invited to the event for disciplinary reasons.

The race was won by Mark Cavendish (Team Dimension Data). This was his second victory, following the 2013 edition. He won Stage 1 and finished second on the second and fifth stages. Alexander Kristoff (Team Katusha) won three other stages, with Edvald Boasson Hagen (Team Dimension Data) winning the time trial but losing time to a puncture on the fourth stage.

== Teams ==
Eighteen teams were invited to take part in the race. Eight of these were UCI WorldTeams; eight were UCI Professional Continental teams; two were UCI Continental teams. The WorldTeam Etixx–Quick-Step, which had won eight of the previous ten editions, including the 2015 edition with Niki Terpstra, was not invited. Although Wilfried Peeters, a directeur sportif with the team, had suggested that the team had chosen not to take part for sporting reasons, it was suggested in the days before the race that the president of the Qatar Cycling Federation, Sheikh Khalid Bin Ali Al-Thani, had declined to invite the team because riders had failed to attend podium ceremonies promptly after winning stages in previous editions.

UCI WorldTeams

- Team Katusha
- Team Dimension Data
- Team Giant–Alpecin
- BMC Racing Team
- Astana
- LottoNL–Jumbo
- AG2R La Mondiale
- Lampre–Merida

UCI Professional Continental teams

- Bora–Argon 18
- Fortuneo–Vital Concept
- Topsport Vlaanderen–Baloise
- Wanty–Groupe Gobert
- Drapac Professional Cycling
- Roompot–Oranje Peloton
- CCC–Sprandi–Polkowice
- UnitedHealthcare

UCI Continental teams

- Skydive Dubai–Al Ahli
- Stölting Service Group

== Route ==
Stage schedule
Stage	Date	Route	Distance	Type	Winner
1	8 February	Dukhan to Al Khor Corniche	176 km (109 mi)	Flat stage	Mark Cavendish (GBR)
2	9 February	Doha to Doha	135 km (84 mi)	Flat stage	Alexander Kristoff (NOR)
3	10 February	Lusail	11 km (7 mi)	Individual time trial	Edvald Boasson Hagen (NOR)
4	11 February	Al Zubara Fort to Madinat ash Shamal	189 km (117 mi)	Flat stage	Alexander Kristoff (NOR)
5	12 February	Sealine Beach Resort to Doha Corniche	114 km (71 mi)	Flat stage	Alexander Kristoff (NOR)

== Stages ==
=== Stage 1 ===
8 February – Dukhan to Al Khor Corniche, 176 km (109 mi)

Result of Stage 1
Rank	Rider	Team	Time
1	Mark Cavendish (GBR)	Team Dimension Data	3h 28' 46"
2	Sacha Modolo (ITA)	Lampre–Merida	+ 0"
3	Andrea Guardini (ITA)	Astana	+ 0"
4	Sam Bennett (IRL)	Bora–Argon 18	+ 0"
5	Alexander Kristoff (NOR)	Team Katusha	+ 0"
6	Edvald Boasson Hagen (NOR)	Team Dimension Data	+ 0"
7	Greg Van Avermaet (BEL)	BMC Racing Team	+ 0"
8	Manuel Quinziato (ITA)	BMC Racing Team	+ 0"
9	Arnaud Gérard (FRA)	Fortuneo–Vital Concept	+ 0"
10	Søren Kragh Andersen (DEN)	Team Giant–Alpecin	+ 0"

General classification after Stage 1
Rank	Rider	Team	Time
1	Mark Cavendish (GBR)	Team Dimension Data	3h 28' 31"
2	Sacha Modolo (ITA)	Lampre–Merida	+ 8"
3	Andrea Guardini (ITA)	Astana	+ 11"
4	Alexander Kristoff (NOR)	Team Katusha	+ 12"
5	Vyacheslav Kuznetsov (RUS)	Team Katusha	+ 13"
6	Greg Van Avermaet (BEL)	BMC Racing Team	+ 14"
7	Sam Bennett (IRL)	Bora–Argon 18	+ 15"
8	Edvald Boasson Hagen (NOR)	Team Dimension Data	+ 15"
9	Manuel Quinziato (ITA)	BMC Racing Team	+ 15"
10	Arnaud Gérard (FRA)	Fortuneo–Vital Concept	+ 15"

=== Stage 2 ===
9 February – Doha to Doha, 135 km (84 mi)

Result of Stage 2
Rank	Rider	Team	Time
1	Alexander Kristoff (NOR)	Team Katusha	3h 11' 26"
2	Mark Cavendish (GBR)	Team Dimension Data	+ 0"
3	Roy Jans (BEL)	Wanty–Groupe Gobert	+ 0"
4	Greg Van Avermaet (BEL)	BMC Racing Team	+ 0"
5	Edvald Boasson Hagen (NOR)	Team Dimension Data	+ 0"
6	Andrea Palini (ITA)	Skydive Dubai–Al Ahli	+ 0"
7	Sacha Modolo (ITA)	Lampre–Merida	+ 0"
8	André Looij (NED)	Roompot–Oranje Peloton	+ 0"
9	Tomasz Kiendyś (POL)	CCC–Sprandi–Polkowice	+ 0"
10	Vyacheslav Kuznetsov (RUS)	Team Katusha	+ 0"

General classification after Stage 2
Rank	Rider	Team	Time
1	Mark Cavendish (GBR)	Team Dimension Data	6h 39' 51"
2	Alexander Kristoff (NOR)	Team Katusha	+ 5"
3	Sacha Modolo (ITA)	Lampre–Merida	+ 14"
4	Andrea Guardini (ITA)	Astana	+ 17"
5	Edvald Boasson Hagen (NOR)	Team Dimension Data	+ 18"
6	Vyacheslav Kuznetsov (RUS)	Team Katusha	+ 18"
7	Greg Van Avermaet (BEL)	BMC Racing Team	+ 20"
8	Arnaud Gérard (FRA)	Fortuneo–Vital Concept	+ 21"
9	Sven Erik Bystrøm (NOR)	Team Katusha	+ 21"
10	Manuel Quinziato (ITA)	BMC Racing Team	+ 21"

=== Stage 3 ===
10 February – Lusail, 11 km (7 mi) (ITT)

Result of Stage 3 (ITT)
Rank	Rider	Team	Time
1	Edvald Boasson Hagen (NOR)	Team Dimension Data	+ 13' 26"
2	Jos van Emden (NED)	LottoNL–Jumbo	+ 25"
3	Manuel Quinziato (ITA)	BMC Racing Team	+ 29"
4	Greg Van Avermaet (BEL)	BMC Racing Team	+ 32"
5	Dmitriy Gruzdev (KAZ)	Astana	+ 40"
6	Lieuwe Westra (NED)	Astana	+ 43"
7	Mark Cavendish (GBR)	Team Dimension Data	+ 44"
8	Jordan Kerby (AUS)	Drapac	+ 44"
9	Søren Kragh Andersen (DEN)	Team Giant–Alpecin	+ 45"
10	Daniel Oss (ITA)	BMC Racing Team	+ 47"

General classification after Stage 3 (ITT)
Rank	Rider	Team	Time
1	Edvald Boasson Hagen (NOR)	Team Dimension Data	6h 53' 35"
2	Mark Cavendish (GBR)	Team Dimension Data	+ 26"
3	Manuel Quinziato (ITA)	BMC Racing Team	+ 32"
4	Greg Van Avermaet (BEL)	BMC Racing Team	+ 34"
5	Alexander Kristoff (NOR)	Team Katusha	+ 45"
6	Søren Kragh Andersen (DEN)	Team Giant–Alpecin	+ 48"
7	Sven Erik Bystrøm (NOR)	Team Katusha	+ 1' 02"
8	Sam Bennett (IRL)	Bora–Argon 18	+ 1' 07"
9	Vyacheslav Kuznetsov (RUS)	Team Katusha	+ 1' 10"
10	Michael Schär (SUI)	BMC Racing Team	+ 1' 15"

=== Stage 4 ===
11 February – Al Zubara Fort to Madinat ash Shamal, 189 km (117 mi)

Result of Stage 4
Rank	Rider	Team	Time
1	Alexander Kristoff (NOR)	Team Katusha	3h 57' 12"
2	Greg Van Avermaet (BEL)	BMC Racing Team	+ 0"
3	Jacopo Guarnieri (ITA)	Team Katusha	+ 0"
4	Sam Bennett (IRL)	Bora–Argon 18	+ 0"
5	Mark Cavendish (GBR)	Team Dimension Data	+ 0"
6	Manuel Quinziato (ITA)	BMC Racing Team	+ 0"
7	Vyacheslav Kuznetsov (RUS)	Team Katusha	+ 6"
8	Søren Kragh Andersen (DEN)	Team Giant–Alpecin	+ 8"
9	Moreno Hofland (NED)	LottoNL–Jumbo	+ 9"
10	Michael Mørkøv (DEN)	Team Katusha	+ 9"

General classification after Stage 4
Rank	Rider	Team	Time
1	Mark Cavendish (GBR)	Team Dimension Data	10h 51' 13"
2	Greg Van Avermaet (BEL)	BMC Racing Team	+ 2"
3	Manuel Quinziato (ITA)	BMC Racing Team	+ 6"
4	Alexander Kristoff (NOR)	Team Katusha	+ 9"
5	Edvald Boasson Hagen (NOR)	Team Dimension Data	+ 19"
6	Søren Kragh Andersen (DEN)	Team Giant–Alpecin	+ 30"
7	Sam Bennett (IRL)	Bora–Argon 18	+ 41"
8	Sven Erik Bystrøm (NOR)	Team Katusha	+ 49"
9	Vyacheslav Kuznetsov (RUS)	Team Katusha	+ 50"
10	Michael Schär (SUI)	BMC Racing Team	+ 58"

=== Stage 5 ===
Result of Stage 5
Rank	Rider	Team	Time
1	Alexander Kristoff (NOR)	Team Katusha	2h 56' 16"
2	Mark Cavendish (GBR)	Team Dimension Data	+ 0"
3	Roy Jans (BEL)	Wanty–Groupe Gobert	+ 0"
4	Yauheni Hutarovich (BLR)	Fortuneo–Vital Concept	+ 0"
5	Sacha Modolo (ITA)	Lampre–Merida	+ 0"
6	Sam Bennett (IRL)	Bora–Argon 18	+ 0"
7	Moreno Hofland (NED)	LottoNL–Jumbo	+ 0"
8	Edvald Boasson Hagen (NOR)	Team Dimension Data	+ 0"
9	André Looij (NED)	Roompot–Oranje Peloton	+ 0"
10	Marco Canola (ITA)	UnitedHealthcare	+ 0"

General classification after Stage 5
Rank	Rider	Team	Time
1	Mark Cavendish (GBR)	Team Dimension Data	13h 47' 23"
2	Alexander Kristoff (NOR)	Team Katusha	+ 5"
3	Greg Van Avermaet (BEL)	BMC Racing Team	+ 8"
4	Manuel Quinziato (ITA)	BMC Racing Team	+ 12"
5	Edvald Boasson Hagen (NOR)	Team Dimension Data	+ 25"
6	Søren Kragh Andersen (DEN)	Team Giant–Alpecin	+ 36"
7	Sam Bennett (IRL)	Bora–Argon 18	+ 47"
8	Sven Erik Bystrøm (NOR)	Team Katusha	+ 55"
9	Vyacheslav Kuznetsov (RUS)	Team Katusha	+ 56"
10	Michael Schar (SUI)	BMC Racing Team	+ 1' 04"

== Classification leadership table ==
Stage	Winner	General classification	Points classification	Young rider classification	Teams classification
1	Mark Cavendish	Mark Cavendish	Mark Cavendish	Søren Kragh Andersen	BMC Racing Team
2	Alexander Kristoff	Mark Cavendish	Mark Cavendish	Sven Erik Bystrøm	Team Katusha
3	Edvald Boasson Hagen	Edvald Boasson Hagen	Mark Cavendish	Søren Kragh Andersen	BMC Racing Team
4	Alexander Kristoff	Mark Cavendish	Alexander Kristoff	Søren Kragh Andersen	BMC Racing Team
5	Alexander Kristoff	Mark Cavendish	Alexander Kristoff	Søren Kragh Andersen	BMC Racing Team
Final		Mark Cavendish	Alexander Kristoff	Søren Kragh Andersen	BMC Racing Team
