= Boris Vallée =

Belgian cyclist

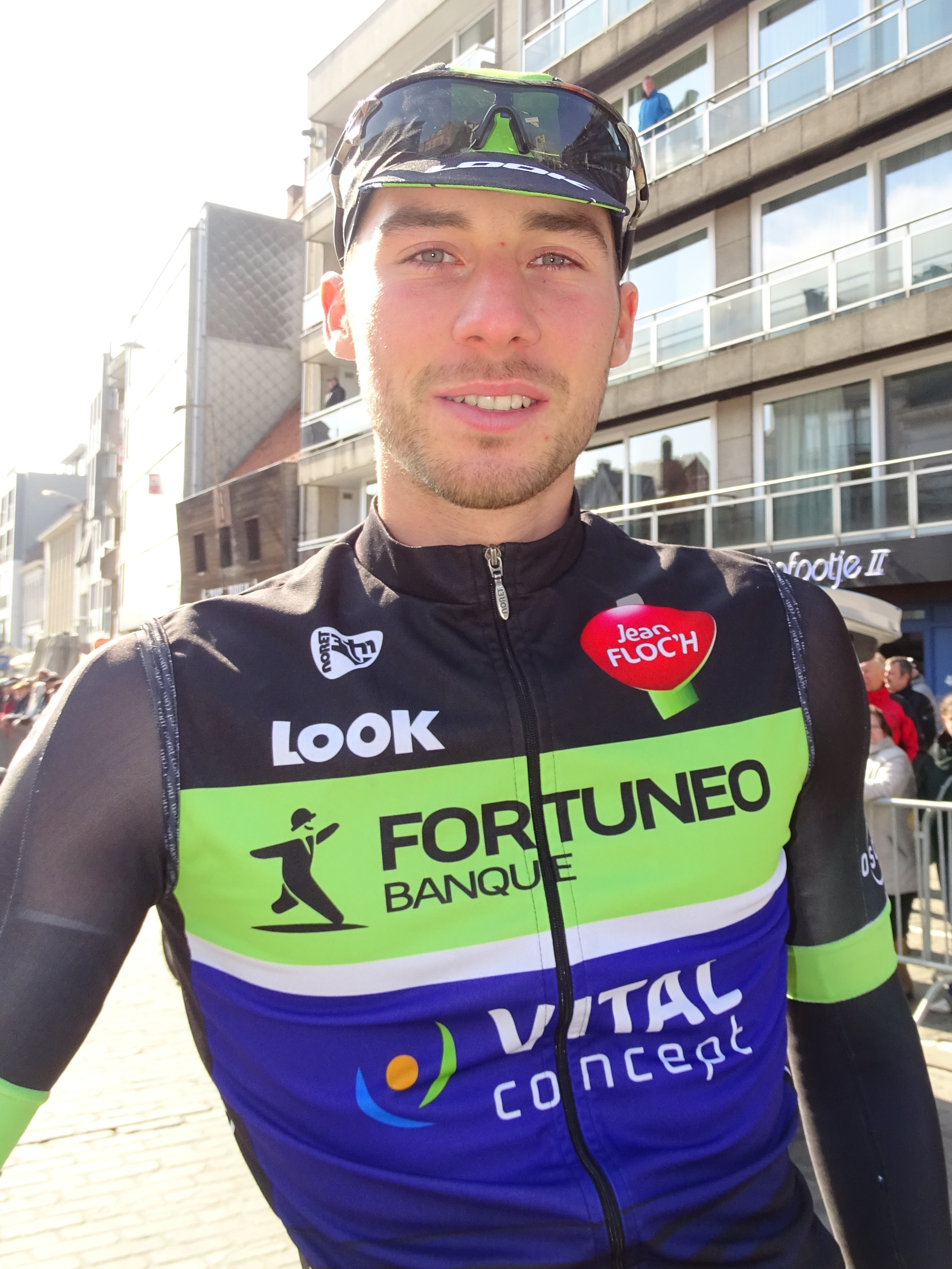
- Vallée in 2016

Personal information
- Full name: Boris Vallée
- Nickname: Bobo
- Born: 3 June 1993 (age 33) Verviers, Belgium
- Height: 1.88 m (6 ft 2 in)
- Weight: 79 kg (174 lb; 12.4 st)

Cycling career
- Sport: Cycling
- Current team: Retired
- Discipline: Road
- Role: Rider

Professional teams
- 2012–2013: Idemasport–Biowanze
- 2014–2015: Lotto–Belisol
- 2016–2017: Fortuneo–Vital Concept
- 2018–2019: Wanty–Groupe Gobert
- 2020–2021: Bingoal–Wallonie Bruxelles

Boris Vallée (born 3 June 1993 in Verviers) is a Belgian former cyclist, who competed as a professional from 2012 to 2021.

== Major results ==
2011
1st Omloop der Vlaamse Gewesten
3rd Time trial, National Junior Road Championships
2012
5th Nationale Sluitingsprijs
2013
1st Prologue Carpathian Couriers Race
1st Grand Prix Criquielion
4th Nationale Sluitingsprijs
8th Road race, Jeux de la Francophonie
2015
2nd Grand Prix de Denain
6th Overall Tour de Wallonie
6th Münsterland Giro
7th Kampioenschap van Vlaanderen
9th Ronde van Zeeland Seaports
2016
Tour de Bretagne

1st Stages 2 & 5

1st Stage 2 Tour de Wallonie
1st Stage 3 Ronde de l'Oise
4th Grote Prijs Jef Scherens
2017
4th Grand Prix de Denain
6th Grote Prijs Stad Zottegem
2018
1st Overall Tour of Taihu Lake
8th Grand Prix Criquielion
2019
2nd Overall Tour of Taihu Lake
5th Halle–Ingooigem
7th Grand Prix d'Isbergues
9th Trofeo Palma
2020
6th Grote Prijs Jean-Pierre Monseré
