= Grand Prix Criquielion =

Belgian one-day road cycling race

Race details
- Date: March
- Region: Hainaut Province, Belgium
- Local name: GP Criquielion (in French)
- Discipline: Road
- Competition: UCI Europe Tour
- Type: One-day race
- Web site: www.ententecyclisteacrenoise.be

History
- First edition: 1991
- Editions: 31 (as of 2026)
- First winner: Claude Criquielion (BEL)
- Most wins: Jelle Wallays (BEL) (2 wins)
- Most recent: Alessandro Borgo (ITA)

The Grand Prix Criquielion is a European single day cycle race held each year in and around the Belgian village of Deux-Acren. The race was first organized in 1991 in honour of Claude Criquielion, who had announced his retirement that same year and was also the first winner of the race. The race was organized as a 1.2 category event on the UCI Europe Tour until 2023 when it upgraded to 1.1 status.

== Winners ==
| Year | Country | Rider | Team |
|---|---|---|---|
| 1991 | Belgium | Claude Criquielion | |
| 1992– 1994 | No race | | |
| 1995 | Belgium | Gino Primo | |
| 1996 | Belgium | Johan Remels | |
| 1997 | Belgium | Steve Van Aken | |
| 1998 | Belgium | Sven Nys | |
| 1999 | Belgium | Gianni David | |
| 2000 | Belgium | Johan Verhaegen | |
| 2001 | Australia | Cameron Hughes | |
| 2002 | Belgium | Renaud Boxus | |
| 2003 | Belgium | Kurt Hovelijnck | |
| 2004 | Great Britain | Hamish Haynes | Cyclingnews.com |
| 2005 | Belgium | Kevin Degezelle | |
| 2006 | Belgium | Jonathan Henrion | |
| 2007 | Belgium | Michael Blanchy | Babes Only-Villapark Lingemeer-Flanders |
| 2008 | Belgium | Fabio Polazzi | Bodysol–Euromillions–Pôle Continental Wallon |
| 2009 | Belgium | Nico Kuypers | |
| 2010 | Belgium | Jelle Wallays | Topsport Vlaanderen–Mercator |
| 2011 | Belgium | Tim De Troyer | |
| 2012 | New Zealand | Tom David | |
| 2013 | Belgium | Boris Vallée | Color Code–Biowanze |
| 2014 | Belgium | Kevin Peeters | Vastgoedservice–Golden Palace |
| 2015 | Belgium | Jelle Wallays | Topsport Vlaanderen–Baloise |
| 2016 | Belgium | Timothy Dupont | Verandas Willems |
| 2017 | Netherlands | Bram Welten | BMC Development Team |
| 2018 | Belgium | Lionel Taminiaux | AGO–Aqua Service |
| 2019 | Belgium | Arne Marit | Lotto–Soudal U23 |
| 2020– 2021 | No race due to the COVID-19 pandemic in Belgium | | |
| 2022 | Canada | Pier-André Côté | Human Powered Health |
| 2023 | Australia | Sam Welsford | Team DSM |
| 2024 | Belgium | Alec Segaert | Lotto–Dstny |
| 2025 | Italy | Matteo Moschetti | Q36.5 Pro Cycling Team |
| 2026 | Italy | Alessandro Borgo | Team Bahrain Victorious |
