= 2015 Tour de Wallonie =

2015 UCI Europe Tour

Race details
- Dates: 25–29 July 2015
- Stages: 5
- Distance: 922 km (573 mi)

Results
| Jersey awarded to the overall winner | Winner | Niki Terpstra (NED) | (Etixx–Quick-Step) |
| | Second | Victor Campenaerts (BEL) | (Topsport Vlaanderen–Baloise) |
| | Third | Sergey Lagutin (RUS) | (Team Katusha) |

The 2015 Tour de Wallonie was a five-stage men's professional road cycling race. It was the forty-second running of the Tour de Wallonie. The race started on 25 July in Frasnes-lez-Anvaing, finishing on 29 July in Waremme. The race was won by Niki Terpstra of Etixx–Quick-Step.

== Teams ==
The sixteen teams invited to participate in the Tour de Wallonie were:

World Tour teams

- AG2R La Mondiale
- BMC Racing Team
- Etixx–Quick-Step
- FDJ
- IAM Cycling
- Lotto–Soudal
- Team Katusha
- Tinkoff–Saxo
- Trek Factory Racing

Professional Continental teams

- Bretagne–Séché Environnement
- Cofidis
- Team Europcar
- Topsport Vlaanderen–Baloise
- Wanty–Groupe Gobert

Continental teams

- Wallonie-Bruxelles
- Veranclassic-Ekoi

== Stages ==
List of stages
| Stage | Date | Course | Distance | Type | Winner |
|---|---|---|---|---|---|
| 1 | 25 July | Wanze - Hannut | 190.7 km (118 mi) | Flat stage | Niki Terpstra (NED) |
| 2 | 26 July | Beaufays - Bassenge | 171.4 km (107 mi) | Flat stage | Danny van Poppel (NED) |
| 3 | 27 July | Bastogne - Namur | 207.0 km (129 mi) | Hilly stage | Philippe Gilbert (BEL) |
| 4 | 28 July | Waterloo - Quaregnon | 164.6 km (102 mi) | Flat stage | Jonas Vangenechten (BEL) |
| 5 | 29 July | Chimay - Thuin | 167.3 km (104 mi) | Hilly stage | Danny van Poppel (NED) |

== Classification leadership ==
| Stage | Winner | General classification | Sprint Classification | Mountains Classification | Points Classification | Team Classification |
|---|---|---|---|---|---|---|
| 1 | Niki Terpstra | Niki Terpstra | Niki Terpstra | Antoine Warnier | Niki Terpstra | Wallonie-Bruxelles |
| 2 | Danny van Poppel | Niki Terpstra | Jean-Pierre Drucker | Antoine Warnier | Danny van Poppel | Etixx–Quick-Step |
| 3 | Philippe Gilbert | Niki Terpstra | Jean-Pierre Drucker | Ludwig De Winter | Danny van Poppel | Topsport Vlaanderen–Baloise |
| 4 | Jonas Vangenechten | Niki Terpstra | Sébastien Delfosse | Ludwig De Winter | Danny van Poppel | Topsport Vlaanderen–Baloise |
| 5 | Danny van Poppel | Niki Terpstra | Sébastien Delfosse | Ludwig De Winter | Danny van Poppel | Topsport Vlaanderen–Baloise |
| Final | | Niki Terpstra | Sébastien Delfosse | Ludwig De Winter | Danny van Poppel | Topsport Vlaanderen–Baloise |
