= Huty =

Village and municipality in Slovakia

- Municipality
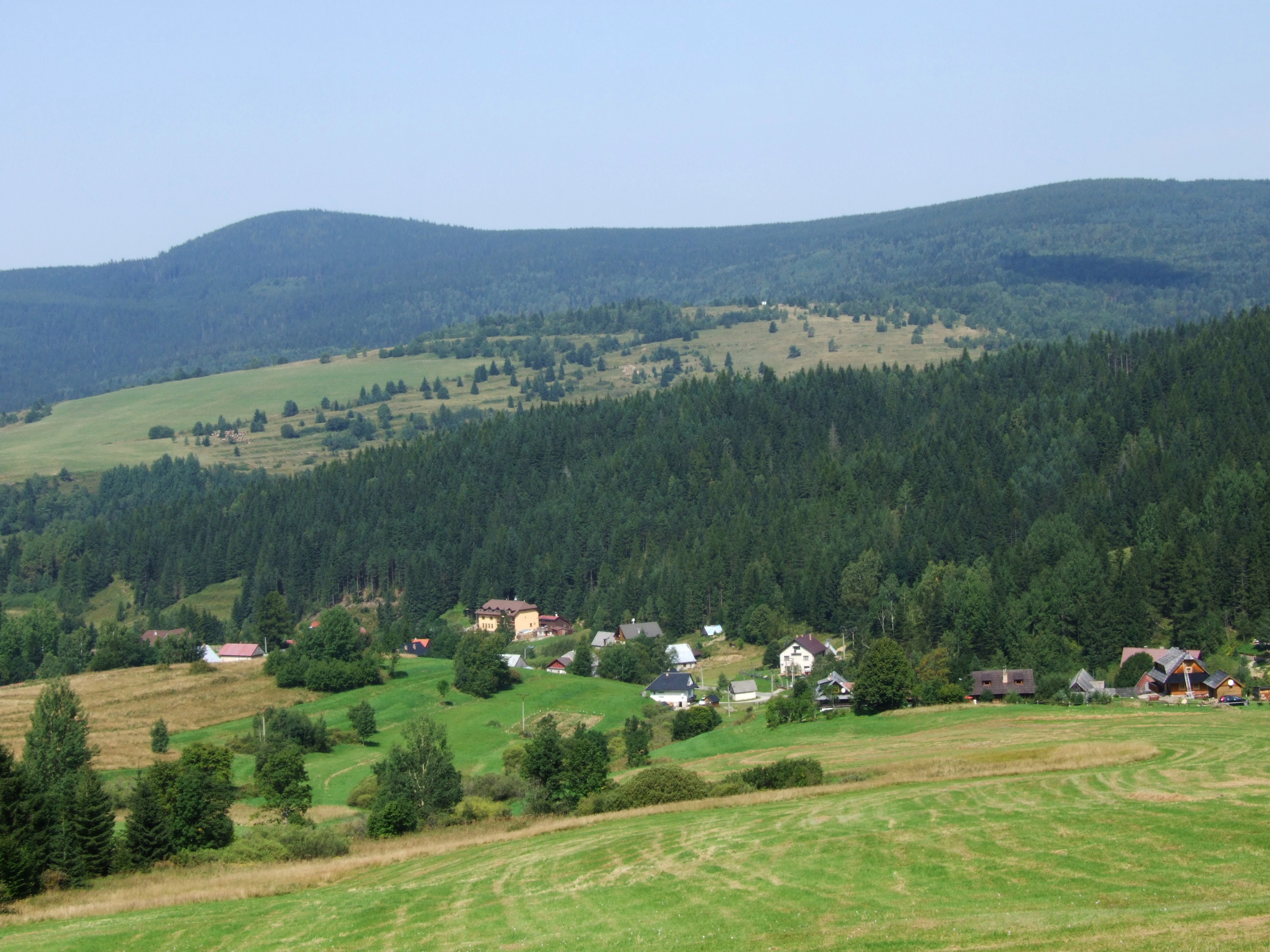

- Flag

- Location of Huty in the Žilina Region Location of Huty in Slovakia
- Coordinates: 49.22°N 19.57°E
- Country: Slovakia
- Region: Žilina Region
- District: Liptovský Mikuláš District
- First mentioned: 1545

Area
  - Total: 11.57 km^{2} (4.47 sq mi)
- Elevation: 807 m (2,648 ft)

Population (2025)
  - Total: 137
- Time zone: UTC+1 (CET)
  - Summer (DST): UTC+2 (CEST)
- Postal code: 274 6
- Area code: +421 44
- Vehicle registration plate (until 2022): LM
- Website: www.huty.sk

Huty (Hungarian: Hutti) is a village and municipality in Liptovský Mikuláš District in the Žilina Region of northern Slovakia.

== History ==
In historical records the village was first mentioned in 1545. Before the establishment of independent Czechoslovakia in 1918, it was part of Liptó County within the Kingdom of Hungary. From 1939 to 1945, it was part of the Slovak Republic.

== Geography ==
The municipality lies at an altitude of 807 metres (2,648 ft) and covers an area of 11.57 km^{2} (4.47 sq mi) (2025).

== Population ==
Population statistic (10 years)
Year	1995	2005	2015	2025
Count	224	220	178	137
Difference		−1.78%	−19.09%	−23.03%

Population statistic
Year	2024	2025
Count	142	137
Difference		−3.52%

It has a population of 137 people (31 December 2025).

=== Ethnicity ===
Census 2021 (1+ %)
Ethnicity	Number	Fraction
Slovak	149	96.12%
Not found out	7	4.51%
Other	3	1.93%
Total	155	

In year 2021 was 155 people by ethnicity 149 as Slovak, 7 as Not found out, 3 as Other, 1 as Czech and 1 as English.

Note on population: The difference values of population numbers in the table "Population statistic" and in the sections "Ethnicity" & "Religion" is caused by the use of various statistical methods.

=== Religion ===
Census 2021 (1+ %)
Religion	Number	Fraction
Roman Catholic Church	131	84.52%
None	13	8.39%
Evangelical Church	4	2.58%
Not found out	3	1.94%
Eastern Orthodox Church	2	1.29%
Total	155	

In year 2021 was 155 people by religion 131 from Roman Catholic Church, 13 from None, 4 from Evangelical Church, 3 from Not found out, 2 from Eastern Orthodox Church, 1 from Jehovah's Witnesses and 1 from Christian Congregations in Slovakia.

== Genealogical resources ==
The records for genealogical research are available at the state archive "Statny Archiv in Bytca, Slovakia"

- Roman Catholic church records (births/marriages/deaths): 1715-1895 (parish A)

== See also ==
- List of municipalities and towns in Slovakia
