= Dison =

Municipality in Liège Province, Wallonia, Belgium

Dison Dizon (Walloon)
- Municipality
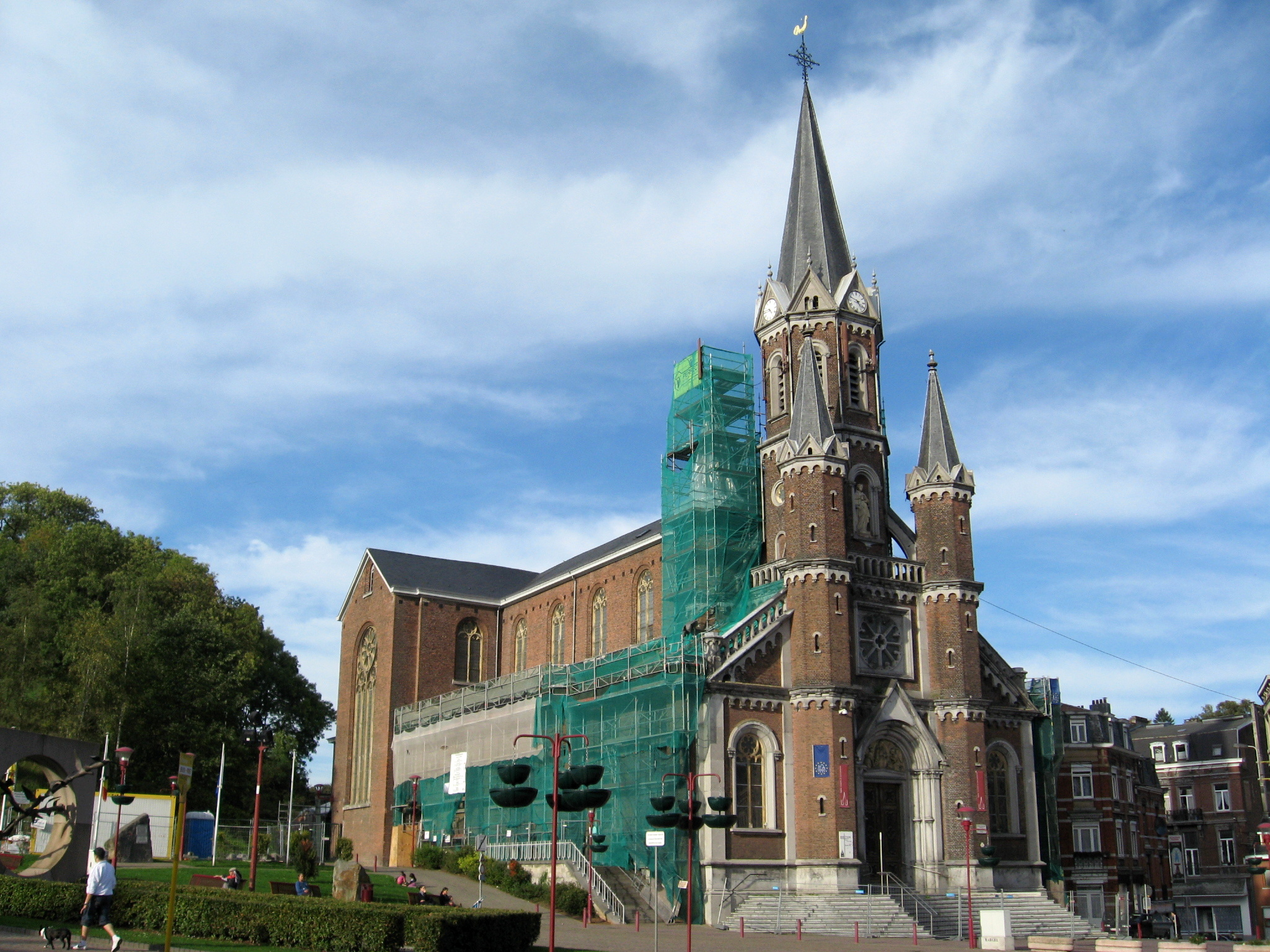

- Flag Coat of arms

- Location of Dison in the province of Liège
- Interactive map of Dison
- Location in Belgium
- Coordinates: 50°37′N 05°51′E
- Country: Belgium
- Community: French Community
- Region: Wallonia
- Province: Liège
- Arrondissement: Verviers

Government
  - Mayor: Véronique Bonni (PS)
  - Governing party: PS

Area
  - Total: 13.97 km^{2} (5.39 sq mi)

Population (2018-01-01)
  - Total: 15,405
  - Density: 1,103/km^{2} (2,856/sq mi)
- Postal codes: 4820-4821
- NIS code: 63020
- Area codes: 087
- Website: www.dison.be

Dison (French pronunciation: [dizɔ̃]; Walloon: Dizon) is a municipality of Wallonia located in the province of Liège, Belgium.

On January 1, 2006, Dison had a total population of 14,243. The total area is 14.01 km^{2} which gives a population density of 1,017 inhabitants per km^{2}.

The municipality consists of the following districts: Andrimont and Dison.
