= Bingoal WB Devo Team =

Belgian cycling team

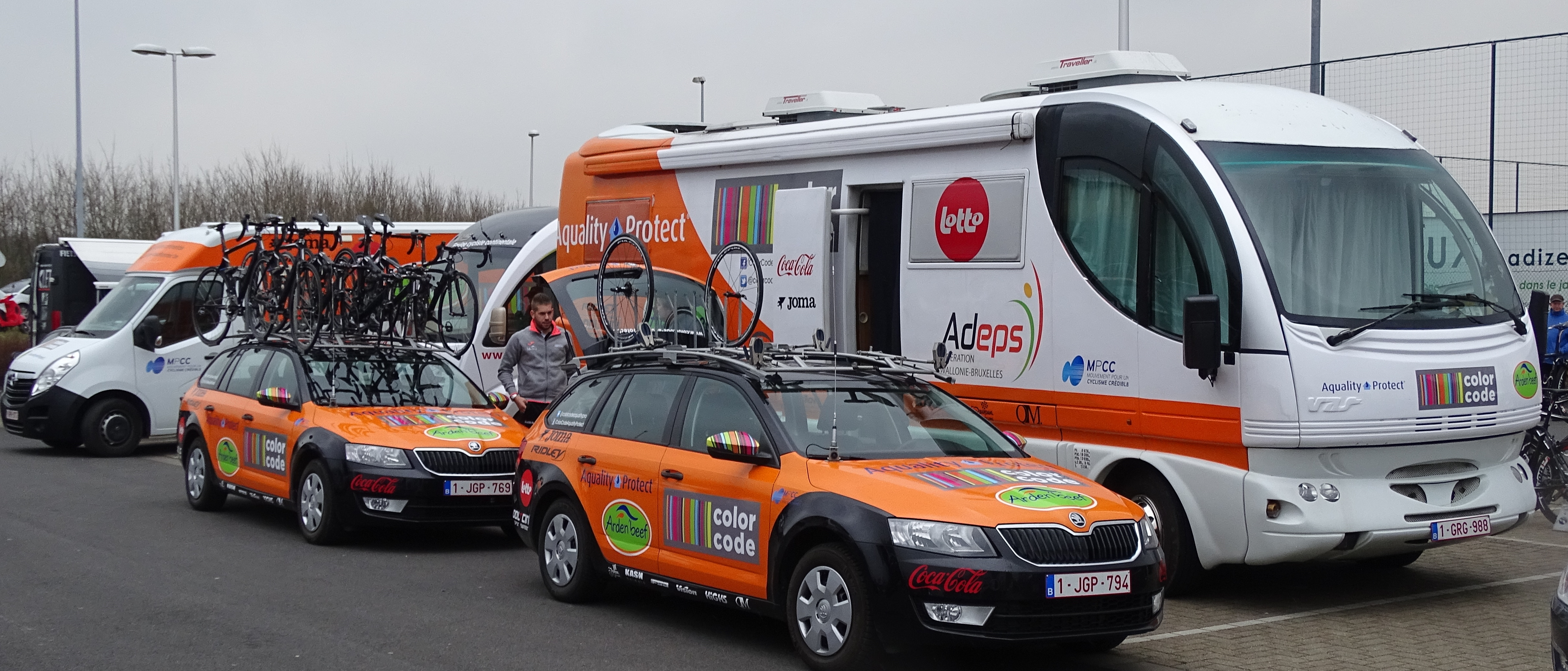

Team information
- UCI code: BWD
- Registered: Belgium
- Founded: 2012
- Discipline: Road
- Status: UCI Continental

Key personnel
- Team managers: Jean-Denis Vandenbroucke; Christophe Brandt; Sébastien Demarbaix; Christophe Detilloux; Kevyn Ista; Olivier Kaisen

Team name history
- 2012 2013–2014 2015 2016 2017–2018 2019–2020 2021 2022 2023 2024: Idemasport–Biowanze; Color Code–Biowanze; Color Code–Aquality Protect; Color Code–Arden'Beef; AGO–Aqua Service; Wallonie–Bruxelles Development Team; Bingoal WB Development Team; Bingoal Pauwels Sauces WB Development Team; Bingoal WB Development Team; Bingoal WB Devo Team
Bingoal WB Devo Team jersey
Jersey

The Bingoal WB Devo Team (UCI team code: WBD) is a Belgian UCI continental team founded in 2012. It participates in UCI Continental Circuits races.

== Team roster ==
As of 4 February 2021.

Rider	Date of birth
Louis Blouwe (BEL)	19 November 1999 (age 26)
Ivan de Ville de Goyet (BEL)	29 November 2002 (age 23)
Jelle Declerck (BEL)	26 November 2002 (age 23)
Félix Dopchie (BEL)	30 December 1999 (age 26)
Noah Fastres (BEL)	16 February 2002 (age 24)
Emerson Fontaine (BEL)	31 July 2000 (age 26)
Gil Gelders (BEL)	16 December 2002 (age 23)
Audric Leleu (BEL)	31 July 2001 (age 25)

Rider	Date of birth
Johan Meens (BEL)	7 July 1999 (age 27)
Sébastien van Poppel (BEL)	7 April 2001 (age 25)
Dayan Van Rillaer (BEL)	11 March 2002 (age 24)
Tom Van Vuchelen (BEL)	24 September 1999 (age 26)
Nathan Vandepitte (FRA)	30 March 2000 (age 26)
Wesley Vercamst (BEL)	19 August 1999 (age 27)
Jago Willems (BEL)	12 November 2001 (age 24)

== Major wins ==
2012
Stage 2b Le Triptyque des Monts et Châteaux, Antoine Demoitié
Stages 2 & 3 Carpathia Couriers Paths, Antoine Demoitié
2013
Stage 3 Le Triptyque des Monts et Châteaux, Florent Mottet
Prologue Carpathian Couriers Race, Boris Vallée
Grand Prix Criquielion, Boris Vallée
2015
Stage 5 Carpathian Couriers Race, Rémy Mertz
2018
Stage 2 Tour du Jura, Tom Wirtgen
Grand Prix Criquielion, Lionel Taminiaux
Luxembourg U23 Time Trial Championships, Tom Wirtgen
2019
Grand Prix de la ville de Pérenchies, Jens Reynders

== National Champions ==
2018
Luxembourg U23 Time Trial, Tom Wirtgen
