= 2017 BMC Racing Team season =

BMC Racing Team
- 2017 season
- UCI code: BMC
- Status: UCI WorldTeam
- Manager: Jim Ochowicz
- Main sponsor(s): BMC Switzerland
- Based: United States
- Bicycles: BMC
- Groupset: Shimano

Season victories
- One-day races: 4
- Stage race overall: 10
- Stage race stages: 28
- National Championships: 6

The 2017 season for the BMC Racing Team began in January with the Tour Down Under. As a UCI WorldTeam, they were automatically invited and obligated to send a squad to every event in the UCI World Tour.

== Team roster ==
As of 1 January 2017.

Rider	Date of birth
Tom Bohli (SUI)	January 17, 1994 (aged 22)
Brent Bookwalter (USA)	February 16, 1984 (aged 32)
Damiano Caruso (ITA)	August 12, 1987 (aged 29)
Alessandro De Marchi (ITA)	May 19, 1986 (aged 30)
Rohan Dennis (AUS)	May 28, 1990 (aged 26)
Silvan Dillier (SUI)	August 3, 1990 (aged 26)
Jempy Drucker (LUX)	September 3, 1986 (aged 30)
Martin Elmiger (SUI)	September 23, 1978 (aged 38)
Kilian Frankiny (SUI)	January 26, 1994 (aged 22)
Floris Gerts (NED)	May 3, 1992 (aged 24)
Ben Hermans (BEL)	June 8, 1986 (aged 30)
Stefan Küng (SUI)	November 16, 1993 (aged 23)
Amaël Moinard (FRA)	February 2, 1982 (aged 34)
Daniel Oss (ITA)	January 13, 1987 (aged 29)

Rider	Date of birth
Richie Porte (AUS)	June 30, 1985 (aged 31)
Manuel Quinziato (ITA)	October 30, 1979 (aged 37)
Nicolas Roche (IRL)	July 3, 1984 (aged 32)
Joey Rosskopf (USA)	September 5, 1989 (aged 27)
Samuel Sánchez (ESP)	February 5, 1978 (aged 38)
Michael Schär (SUI)	September 29, 1986 (aged 30)
Miles Scotson (AUS)	January 18, 1994 (aged 22)
Manuel Senni (ITA)	March 11, 1992 (aged 24)
Dylan Teuns (BEL)	March 1, 1992 (aged 24)
Greg Van Avermaet (BEL)	May 17, 1985 (aged 31)
Tejay van Garderen (USA)	August 12, 1988 (aged 28)
Francisco Ventoso (ESP)	May 6, 1982 (aged 34)
Loïc Vliegen (BEL)	December 20, 1993 (aged 23)
Danilo Wyss (SUI)	August 26, 1985 (aged 31)

Riders who joined the team for the 2017 season

Rider	2016 team
Martin Elmiger	IAM Cycling
Kilian Frankiny	neo-pro (BMC Development Team)
Nicolas Roche	Team Sky
Miles Scotson	Team Illuminate
Francisco Ventoso	Movistar Team

Riders who left the team during or after the 2016 season

Rider	2017 team
Darwin Atapuma	UAE Team Emirates
Marcus Burghardt	Bora–Hansgrohe
Philippe Gilbert	Quick-Step Floors
Taylor Phinney	Cannondale–Drapac
Peter Velits	Retired
Rick Zabel	Team Katusha–Alpecin

== Season victories ==
Date	Race	Competition	Rider	Country	Location
18 January	Tour Down Under, Stage 2	UCI World Tour	Richie Porte (AUS)	Australia	Paracombe
21 January	Tour Down Under, Stage 5	UCI World Tour	Richie Porte (AUS)	Australia	Willunga
22 January	Tour Down Under, Overall	UCI World Tour	Richie Porte (AUS)	Australia	
1 February	Volta a la Comunitat Valenciana, Stage 1	UCI Europe Tour	Team Time Trial (Note: The winning riders were Tom Bohli, Alessandro De Marchi, Ben Hermans, Stefan Küng, Nicolas Roche, Michael Schär and Greg Van Avermaet)	Spain	Orihuela
5 February	Volta a la Comunitat Valenciana, Youth classification	UCI Europe Tour	Manuel Senni (ITA)	Spain	
15 February	Tour of Oman, Stage 2	UCI Asia Tour	Ben Hermans (BEL)	Oman	Al-Bustan
18 February	Tour of Oman, Stage 5	UCI Asia Tour	Ben Hermans (BEL)	Oman	Jebel Akhdar
19 February	Tour of Oman, Overall	UCI Asia Tour	Ben Hermans (BEL)	Oman	
19 February	Tour du Haut Var, Youth classification	UCI Europe Tour	Tom Bohli (SUI)	France	
19 February	Tour du Haut Var, Teams classification	UCI Europe Tour	(Note: The riders on the squad were Tom Bohli, Brent Bookwalter, Damiano Caruso, Silvan Dillier, Floris Gerts, Joey Rosskopf, Miles Scotson and Francisco Ventoso)	France	
23 February	Tour La Provence, Overall	UCI Europe Tour	Rohan Dennis (AUS)	France	
23 February	Tour La Provence, Points classification	UCI Europe Tour	Rohan Dennis (AUS)	France	
23 February	Tour La Provence, Teams classification	UCI Europe Tour	(Note: The riders on the squad were Tom Bohli, Brent Bookwalter, Damiano Caruso, Rohan Dennis, Silvan Dillier, Amaël Moinard, Joey Rosskopf and Danilo Wyss)	France	
25 February	Omloop Het Nieuwsblad	UCI World Tour	Greg Van Avermaet (BEL)	Belgium	Ghent
8 March	Tirreno–Adriatico, Stage 1	UCI World Tour	Team Time Trial (Note: The winning riders were Greg Van Avermaet, Damiano Caruso, Rohan Dennis, Jempy Drucker, Stefan Küng, Daniel Oss, Manuel Quinziato and Tejay van Garderen)	Italy	Lido di Camaiore
11 March	Paris–Nice, Stage 7	UCI World Tour	Richie Porte (AUS)	France	Col de la Couillole
14 March	Tirreno–Adriatico, Stage 7	UCI World Tour	Greg Van Avermaet (BEL)	Italy	San Benedetto del Tronto
21 March	Volta a Catalunya, Stage 2	UCI World Tour	Team Time Trial (Note: The winning riders were Samuel Sánchez, Rohan Dennis, Tejay van Garderen, Ben Hermans, Brent Bookwalter, Joey Rosskopf, Alessandro De Marchi and Kilian Frankiny)	Spain	Banyoles
24 March	E3 Harelbeke	UCI World Tour	Greg Van Avermaet (BEL)	Belgium	Harelbeke
26 March	Gent–Wevelgem	UCI World Tour	Greg Van Avermaet (BEL)	Belgium	Wevelgem
9 April	Paris–Roubaix	UCI World Tour	Greg Van Avermaet (BEL)	France	Roubaix
18 April	Tour of the Alps, Stage 2	UCI Europe Tour	Rohan Dennis (AUS)	Austria	Innervillgraten
21 April	Tour of the Alps, Teams classification	UCI Europe Tour	(Note: The riders on the squad were Damiano Caruso, Rohan Dennis, Manuel Senni, Kilian Frankiny, Brent Bookwalter, Joey Rosskopf, Tom Bohli and Miles Scotson)	Austria; Italy	
27 April	Tour de Romandie, Stage 2	UCI World Tour	Stefan Küng (SUI)	Switzerland	Bulle
30 April	Tour de Romandie, Overall	UCI World Tour	Richie Porte (AUS)	Switzerland	
30 April	Tour de Romandie, Points classification	UCI World Tour	Stefan Küng (SUI)	Switzerland	
11 May	Giro d'Italia, Stage 6	UCI World Tour	Silvan Dillier (SUI)	Italy	Terme Luigiane
25 May	Giro d'Italia, Stage 18	UCI World Tour	Tejay van Garderen (USA)	Italy	Ortisei/St. Ulrich
1 June	Tour de Luxembourg, Stage 1	UCI Europe Tour	Jempy Drucker (LUX)	Luxembourg	Bascharage
2 June	Tour de Luxembourg, Stage 2	UCI Europe Tour	Greg Van Avermaet (BEL)	Luxembourg	Walferdange
4 June	Tour de Luxembourg, Stage 4	UCI Europe Tour	Greg Van Avermaet (BEL)	Luxembourg	Luxembourg
4 June	Tour de Luxembourg, Overall	UCI Europe Tour	Greg Van Avermaet (BEL)	Luxembourg	
4 June	Tour de Luxembourg, Points classification	UCI Europe Tour	Greg Van Avermaet (BEL)	Luxembourg	
7 June	Critérium du Dauphiné, Stage 5	UCI World Tour	Richie Porte (AUS)	France	Bourgoin-Jallieu
10 June	Tour de Suisse, Stage 1	UCI World Tour	Rohan Dennis (AUS)	Switzerland	Cham
18 June	Route du Sud, Overall	UCI Europe Tour	Silvan Dillier (SUI)	France	
18 June	Route du Sud, Points classification	UCI Europe Tour	Silvan Dillier (SUI)	France	
18 June	Route du Sud, Mountains classification	UCI Europe Tour	Silvan Dillier (SUI)	France	
18 June	Tour de Suisse, Stage 9	UCI World Tour	Rohan Dennis (AUS)	Switzerland	Schaffhausen
24 July	Tour de Wallonie, Stage 3	UCI Europe Tour	Dylan Teuns (BEL)	Belgium	Houffalize
25 July	Tour de Wallonie, Stage 4	UCI Europe Tour	Jempy Drucker (LUX)	Belgium	Profondeville
26 July	Tour de Wallonie, Stage 5	UCI Europe Tour	Dylan Teuns (BEL)	Belgium	Thuin
26 July	Tour de Wallonie, Overall	UCI Europe Tour	Dylan Teuns (BEL)	Belgium	
26 July	Tour de Wallonie, Points classification	UCI Europe Tour	Dylan Teuns (BEL)	Belgium	
31 July	Tour de Pologne, Stage 3	UCI World Tour	Dylan Teuns (BEL)	Poland	Szczyrk
1 August	Tour of Utah, Stage 2	UCI America Tour	Brent Bookwalter (USA)	United States	Snowbasin
4 August	Tour de Pologne, Overall	UCI World Tour	Dylan Teuns (BEL)	Poland	
8 August	BinckBank Tour, Stage 2	UCI World Tour	Stefan Küng (SUI)	Netherlands	Voorburg
10 August	Arctic Race of Norway, Stage 1	UCI Europe Tour	Dylan Teuns (BEL)	Norway	Narvik
13 August	Arctic Race of Norway, Stage 4	UCI Europe Tour	Dylan Teuns (BEL)	Norway	Tromsø
13 August	Arctic Race of Norway, Overall	UCI Europe Tour	Dylan Teuns (BEL)	Norway	
13 August	Arctic Race of Norway, Points classification	UCI Europe Tour	Dylan Teuns (BEL)	Norway	
13 August	Arctic Race of Norway, Youth classification	UCI Europe Tour	Dylan Teuns (BEL)	Norway	
13 August	Colorado Classic, Overall	UCI America Tour	Manuel Senni (ITA)	United States	
19 August	Vuelta a España, Stage 1	UCI World Tour	Team Time Trial (Note: The winning riders were Damiano Caruso, Alessandro De Marchi, Rohan Dennis, Kilian Frankiny, Daniel Oss, Nicolas Roche, Loïc Vliegen, Tejay van Garderen and Francisco Ventoso)	France	Nîmes

== National, Continental and World champions 2017 ==
Date	Discipline	Jersey	Rider	Country	Location
5 January	Australian National Time Trial Champion		Rohan Dennis (AUS)	Australia	Ballarat
8 January	Australian National Road Race Champion		Miles Scotson (AUS)	Australia	Buninyong
21 June	Luxembourg National Time Trial Champion		Jempy Drucker (LUX)	Luxembourg	Remerschen
22 June	Swiss National Time Trial Champion		Stefan Küng (SUI)	Switzerland	Lüterkofen-Ichertswil
24 June	United States National Time Trial Champion		Joey Rosskopf (USA)	United States	Knoxville
25 June	Swiss National Road Race Champion		Silvan Dillier (SUI)	Switzerland	Affoltern am Albis
