= 2017 Tour de Pologne =

Cycling race

2017 UCI World Tour, race 27 of 37

Race details
- Dates: 29 July – 4 August 2017
- Stages: 7
- Distance: 1,122 km (697.2 mi)

Results
Jersey awarded to the overall winner	Winner	Dylan Teuns (BEL)	(BMC Racing Team)
	Second	Rafał Majka (POL)	(Bora–Hansgrohe)
	Third	Wout Poels (NED)	(Team Sky)
Jersey awarded to the mountains classification winner	Mountains	Diego Rosa (ITA)	(Team Sky)
Jersey awarded to the sprints classification winner	Sprints	Peter Sagan (SVK)	(Bora–Hansgrohe)
Jersey awarded to the combativity classification winner	Combativity	Bert-Jan Lindeman (NED)	(LottoNL–Jumbo)
	Team	Lotto–Soudal	

The 2017 Tour de Pologne was a road cycling stage race that took place between 29 July and 4 August in Poland. It was the 74th edition of the Tour de Pologne and was the twenty-seventh event of the 2017 UCI World Tour. The race was won by Dylan Teuns riding for BMC Racing Team.

== Schedule ==
The race route was announced on 15 May 2017 at the BGŻ Arena in Pruszków.

Stage characteristics and winners
Stage	Date	Route	Distance	Type	Winner
1	29 July	Kraków to Kraków	130 km (81 mi)	Hilly stage	Peter Sagan (SVK)
2	30 July	Tarnowskie Góry to Katowice	142 km (88 mi)	Flat stage	Sacha Modolo (ITA)
3	31 July	Jaworzno to Szczyrk	161 km (100 mi)	Mountain stage	Dylan Teuns (BEL)
4	1 August	Zawiercie to Zabrze	238 km (148 mi)	Hilly stage	Caleb Ewan (AUS)
5	2 August	Nagawczyna to Rzeszów	130 km (81 mi)	Medium-mountain stage	Danny van Poppel (NED)
6	3 August	Wieliczka Salt Mine to Zakopane	189 km (117 mi)	Mountain stage	Jack Haig (AUS)
7	4 August	Terma Bukowina Tatrzańska to Bukowina Tatrzańska	132 km (82 mi)	Mountain stage	Wout Poels (NED)
Total		1,122 km (697.2 mi)			

== Participating teams ==
As the 2017 Tour de Pologne was a UCI World Tour event, all eighteen UCI WorldTeams were invited automatically and obliged to enter a team into the race. Along with a Polish national team, three other squads were given wildcard places into the race, and as such, formed the event's 22-team peloton. The number of riders allowed per squad was seven, down from eight, in 2016; all teams except Cannondale–Drapac (six riders) did so, and therefore the start list contained a total of 153 riders.

UCI WorldTeams

- AG2R La Mondiale
- Astana
- Bahrain–Merida
- BMC Racing Team
- Bora–Hansgrohe
- Cannondale–Drapac
- Team Dimension Data
- FDJ
- Team Katusha–Alpecin
- LottoNL–Jumbo
- Lotto–Soudal
- Movistar Team
- Orica–Scott
- Quick-Step Floors
- Team Sky
- Team Sunweb
- Trek–Segafredo
- UAE Team Emirates

UCI Professional Continental teams

- CCC–Sprandi–Polkowice
- Gazprom–RusVelo
- Team Novo Nordisk

National team

- Poland

== Stages ==
=== Stage 1 ===
29 July 2017 – Kraków to Kraków, 130 km (80.8 mi)

The opening stage of the 2017 Tour de Pologne was a ride around Krakow, effectively designed for the sprinters. Having left from the city's Old Square, the peloton completed an anti-clockwise loop around the city, which contained the only two categorised climbs, in the villages of Bachowice and Kaszów, both fourth category. Once the riders returned to Kraków, they first passed the sole intermediate sprint, before completing three laps around a 4 km (2.5 mi) circuit, to complete the day's running.

Stage 1 result
Rank	Rider	Team	Time
1	Peter Sagan (SVK)	Bora–Hansgrohe	2h 56' 16"
2	Caleb Ewan (AUS)	Orica–Scott	+ 0"
3	Danny van Poppel (NED)	Team Sky	+ 0"
4	Riccardo Minali (ITA)	Astana	+ 0"
5	Niccolò Bonifazio (ITA)	Bahrain–Merida	+ 0"
6	Nathan Haas (AUS)	Team Dimension Data	+ 0"
7	Roberto Ferrari (ITA)	UAE Team Emirates	+ 0"
8	Paweł Franczak (POL)	Poland (national team)	+ 0"
9	Boy van Poppel (NED)	Trek–Segafredo	+ 0"
10	Jens Debusschere (BEL)	Lotto–Soudal	+ 0"

General classification after Stage 1
Rank	Rider	Team	Time
1	Peter Sagan (SVK)	Bora–Hansgrohe	2h 56' 06"
2	Caleb Ewan (AUS)	Orica–Scott	+ 4"
3	Danny van Poppel (NED)	Team Sky	+ 6"
4	Nathan Haas (AUS)	Team Dimension Data	+ 9"
5	Riccardo Minali (ITA)	Astana	+ 10"
6	Niccolò Bonifazio (ITA)	Bahrain–Merida	+ 10"
7	Roberto Ferrari (ITA)	UAE Team Emirates	+ 10"
8	Paweł Franczak (POL)	Poland (national team)	+ 10"
9	Boy van Poppel (NED)	Trek–Segafredo	+ 10"
10	Jens Debusschere (BEL)	Lotto–Soudal	+ 10"

=== Stage 2 ===
30 July 2017 – Tarnowskie Góry to Katowice, 142 km (88.2 mi)

The second stage was another opportunity for the sprinters. After the start in Tarnowskie Góry, the riders headed south-east, passing through the intermediate sprints in Piekary Śląskie, Chorzów and Siemianowice Śląskie, following devious roads before hitting the 17 km (10.6 mi) finishing circuit in Katowice. It contained the two category four climbs of the day, and the final metres before the finish line headed slightly downhill, with speeds of about 80 kilometres per hour (50 mph) expected from the top riders.

Stage 2 result
Rank	Rider	Team	Time
1	Sacha Modolo (ITA)	UAE Team Emirates	3h 15' 21"
2	Danny van Poppel (NED)	Team Sky	+ 0"
3	Max Walscheid (GER)	Team Sunweb	+ 0"
4	Boy van Poppel (NED)	Trek–Segafredo	+ 0"
5	Youcef Reguigui (ALG)	Team Dimension Data	+ 0"
6	Tom Van Asbroeck (BEL)	Cannondale–Drapac	+ 0"
7	Niccolò Bonifazio (ITA)	Bahrain–Merida	+ 0"
8	Peter Sagan (SVK)	Bora–Hansgrohe	+ 0"
9	Riccardo Minali (ITA)	Astana	+ 0"
10	Nathan Haas (AUS)	Team Dimension Data	+ 0"

General classification after Stage 2
Rank	Rider	Team	Time
1	Danny van Poppel (NED)	Team Sky	6h 11' 27"
2	Peter Sagan (SVK)	Bora–Hansgrohe	+ 0"
3	Sacha Modolo (ITA)	UAE Team Emirates	+ 0"
4	Caleb Ewan (AUS)	Orica–Scott	+ 4"
5	Max Walscheid (GER)	Team Sunweb	+ 6"
6	Kamil Gradek (POL)	Poland (national team)	+ 7"
7	Nathan Haas (AUS)	Team Dimension Data	+ 9"
8	Wout Poels (NED)	Team Sky	+ 9"
9	Niccolò Bonifazio (ITA)	Bahrain–Merida	+ 10"
10	Boy van Poppel (NED)	Trek–Segafredo	+ 10"

=== Stage 3 ===
31 July 2017 – Jaworzno to Szczyrk, 161 km (100 mi)

After the opening two sprint stages, the next stage took the riders into the Silesian Beskids with a route that favoured the climbers. After a reasonably flat first half, the first category Salmopol was climbed, before the riders entered a circuit containing the Zameczek climb, which was climbed twice. Once the riders had descended, they returned over the Salmopol, going in the opposite way from that climbed previously, with the summit coming 11.3 kilometres (7.0 miles) before the finish line. The final ascent was only 1.2 kilometres (0.7 miles) long, but averaged 11.3%.

Stage 3 result
Rank	Rider	Team	Time
1	Dylan Teuns (BEL)	BMC Racing Team	3h 51' 41"
2	Peter Sagan (SVK)	Bora–Hansgrohe	+ 0"
3	Rafał Majka (POL)	Bora–Hansgrohe	+ 0"
4	Wilco Kelderman (NED)	Team Sunweb	+ 0"
5	Tom-Jelte Slagter (NED)	Cannondale–Drapac	+ 5"
6	Odd Christian Eiking (NOR)	FDJ	+ 7"
7	Domenico Pozzovivo (ITA)	AG2R La Mondiale	+ 8"
8	Adam Yates (GBR)	Orica–Scott	+ 9"
9	Wout Poels (NED)	Team Sky	+ 12"
10	Sam Oomen (NED)	Team Sunweb	+ 14"

General classification after Stage 3
Rank	Rider	Team	Time
1	Peter Sagan (SVK)	Bora–Hansgrohe	10h 03' 02"
2	Dylan Teuns (BEL)	BMC Racing Team	+ 6"
3	Rafał Majka (POL)	Bora–Hansgrohe	+ 12"
4	Wilco Kelderman (NED)	Team Sunweb	+ 16"
5	Tom-Jelte Slagter (NED)	Cannondale–Drapac	+ 21"
6	Odd Christian Eiking (NOR)	FDJ	+ 23"
7	Domenico Pozzovivo (ITA)	AG2R La Mondiale	+ 24"
8	Wout Poels (NED)	Team Sky	+ 25"
9	Adam Yates (GBR)	Orica–Scott	+ 25"
10	Nathan Haas (AUS)	Team Dimension Data	+ 30"

=== Stage 4 ===
1 August 2017 – Zawiercie to Zabrze, 238 km (148 mi)

With a length of 238 kilometres (148 miles), the fourth stage was the longest stage of the 2017 Tour de Pologne. Having started in Zawiercie, the first section of the route was hilly, covering the sole categorised climb of the day in Olkusz, where there was also an intermediate sprint, with the other two being in Jastrzębie-Zdrój and Rybnik. A finishing circuit was also utilised in the finishing city of Zabrze, with three laps of a 6.5 km (4.0 mi) long loop being completed to complete proceedings.

Stage 4 result
Rank	Rider	Team	Time
1	Caleb Ewan (AUS)	Orica–Scott	5h 38' 49"
2	Danny van Poppel (NED)	Team Sky	+ 0"
3	Peter Sagan (SVK)	Bora–Hansgrohe	+ 0"
4	Boy van Poppel (NED)	Trek–Segafredo	+ 0"
5	Sacha Modolo (ITA)	UAE Team Emirates	+ 0"
6	Lorrenzo Manzin (FRA)	FDJ	+ 0"
7	Tom Van Asbroeck (BEL)	Cannondale–Drapac	+ 0"
8	Enrico Battaglin (ITA)	LottoNL–Jumbo	+ 0"
9	Alan Banaszek (POL)	CCC–Sprandi–Polkowice	+ 0"
10	Roberto Ferrari (ITA)	UAE Team Emirates	+ 0"

General classification after Stage 4
Rank	Rider	Team	Time
1	Peter Sagan (SVK)	Bora–Hansgrohe	15h 41' 47"
2	Dylan Teuns (BEL)	BMC Racing Team	+ 10"
3	Rafał Majka (POL)	Bora–Hansgrohe	+ 16"
4	Wilco Kelderman (NED)	Team Sunweb	+ 20"
5	Tom-Jelte Slagter (NED)	Cannondale–Drapac	+ 25"
6	Odd Christian Eiking (NOR)	FDJ	+ 27"
7	Domenico Pozzovivo (ITA)	AG2R La Mondiale	+ 28"
8	Wout Poels (NED)	Team Sky	+ 29"
9	Adam Yates (GBR)	Orica–Scott	+ 29"
10	Nathan Haas (AUS)	Team Dimension Data	+ 34"

=== Stage 5 ===
2 August 2017 – Olimp Nagawczyna to Rzeszów, 130 km (81 mi)

The stage started from Olimp Nagawczyna, near Dębica, heading south-east, through the Podkarpackie Voivodeship. The route was hilly throughout, with four categorised climbs all coming in the second half of the section – two ascents in Gmina Lubenia and one in Łany (part of the village Matysówka), before the riders entered Rzeszów, where the only intermediate sprint was held. There, the peloton entered the lengthy 22.5 km (14.0 mi) circuit, to be covered once, and containing another ascent of Łany, the summit coming 10.6 km (6.6 mi) before the finish.

Stage 5 result
Rank	Rider	Team	Time
1	Danny van Poppel (NED)	Team Sky	2h 59' 44"
2	Luka Mezgec (SVN)	Orica–Scott	+ 0"
3	Peter Sagan (SVK)	Bora–Hansgrohe	+ 0"
4	Roberto Ferrari (ITA)	UAE Team Emirates	+ 0"
5	Enrico Battaglin (ITA)	LottoNL–Jumbo	+ 0"
6	Niccolò Bonifazio (ITA)	Bahrain–Merida	+ 0"
7	Daniel Oss (ITA)	BMC Racing Team	+ 0"
8	José Joaquín Rojas (ESP)	Movistar Team	+ 0"
9	Tomasz Marczyński (POL)	Lotto–Soudal	+ 0"
10	Łukasz Wiśniowski (POL)	Team Sky	+ 0"

General classification after Stage 5
Rank	Rider	Team	Time
1	Peter Sagan (SVK)	Bora–Hansgrohe	18h 41' 27"
2	Dylan Teuns (BEL)	BMC Racing Team	+ 14"
3	Rafał Majka (POL)	Bora–Hansgrohe	+ 20"
4	Wilco Kelderman (NED)	Team Sunweb	+ 24"
5	Odd Christian Eiking (NOR)	FDJ	+ 31"
6	Domenico Pozzovivo (ITA)	AG2R La Mondiale	+ 32"
7	Wout Poels (NED)	Team Sky	+ 33"
8	Adam Yates (GBR)	Orica–Scott	+ 33"
9	Vincenzo Nibali (ITA)	UAE Team Emirates	+ 39"
10	Gorka Izagirre (ESP)	Movistar Team	+ 39"

=== Stage 6 ===
3 August 2017 – Wieliczka Salt Mine to Zakopane, 189 km (117 mi)

Stage 6 result
Rank	Rider	Team	Time
1	Jack Haig (AUS)	Orica–Scott	4h 58' 55"
2	Wout Poels (NED)	Team Sky	+ 51"
3	Bob Jungels (LUX)	Quick-Step Floors	+ 51"
4	Rui Costa (POR)	UAE Team Emirates	+ 51"
5	Wilco Kelderman (NED)	Team Sunweb	+ 51"
6	Vincenzo Nibali (ITA)	Bahrain–Merida	+ 51"
7	Ilnur Zakarin (RUS)	Team Katusha–Alpecin	+ 51"
8	Rafał Majka (POL)	Bora–Hansgrohe	+ 51"
9	Adam Yates (GBR)	Orica–Scott	+ 51"
10	Sam Oomen (NED)	Team Sunweb	+ 51"

General classification after Stage 6
Rank	Rider	Team	Time
1	Dylan Teuns (BEL)	BMC Racing Team	23h 41' 27"
2	Rafał Majka (POL)	Bora–Hansgrohe	+ 6"
3	Wilco Kelderman (NED)	Team Sunweb	+ 10"
4	Wout Poels (NED)	Team Sky	+ 13"
5	Domenico Pozzovivo (ITA)	AG2R La Mondiale	+ 18"
6	Adam Yates (GBR)	Orica–Scott	+ 19"
7	Sam Oomen (NED)	Team Sunweb	+ 24"
8	Vincenzo Nibali (ITA)	Bahrain–Merida	+ 25"
9	Rui Costa (POR)	UAE Team Emirates	+ 28"
10	Bob Jungels (LUX)	Quick-Step Floors	+ 29"

=== Stage 7 ===
4 August 2017 – Terma Bukowina Tatrzańska to Bukowina Tatrzańska, 132 km (82 mi)

Stage 7 result
Rank	Rider	Team	Time
1	Wout Poels (NED)	Team Sky	3h 26' 20"
2	Adam Yates (GBR)	Orica–Scott	s.t.
3	Rafał Majka (POL)	Bora–Hansgrohe	s.t.
4	Wilco Kelderman (NED)	Team Sunweb	s.t.
5	Dylan Teuns (BEL)	BMC Racing Team	s.t.
6	Domenico Pozzovivo (ITA)	AG2R La Mondiale	+ 5"
7	Sam Oomen (NED)	Team Sunweb	+ 12"
8	Jack Haig (AUS)	Orica–Scott	+ 14"
9	Tejay van Garderen (USA)	BMC Racing Team	+ 18"
10	Rui Costa (POR)	UAE Team Emirates	+ 54"

Final general classification
Rank	Rider	Team	Time
1	Dylan Teuns (BEL)	BMC Racing Team	27h 07' 47"
2	Rafał Majka (POL)	Bora–Hansgrohe	+ 2"
3	Wout Poels (NED)	Team Sky	+ 3"
4	Wilco Kelderman (NED)	Team Sunweb	+ 10"
5	Adam Yates (GBR)	Orica–Scott	+ 13"
6	Domenico Pozzovivo (ITA)	AG2R La Mondiale	+ 23"
7	Sam Oomen (NED)	Team Sunweb	+ 36"
8	Jack Haig (AUS)	Orica–Scott	+ 57"
9	Vincenzo Nibali (ITA)	Bahrain–Merida	+ 1'19"
10	Rui Costa (POR)	UAE Team Emirates	+ 1'22"

== Classification leadership table ==
In the 2017 Tour de Pologne, four different jerseys were awarded. The general classification was calculated by adding each cyclist's finishing times on each stage, and allowing time bonuses for the first three finishers at intermediate sprints (three seconds to first, two seconds to second and one second to third) and at the finish of all stages: the stage winner won a ten-second bonus, with six and four seconds for the second and third riders respectively. The leader of the classification received a yellow jersey; it was considered the most important of the 2017 Tour de Pologne, and the winner of the classification was considered the winner of the race.

Points for the mountains classification
Position	1	2	3	4	5
Points for Category P1	20	14	10	6	4
Points for Category 1	10	7	5	3	2
Points for Category 2	5	3	2	1	0
Points for Category 3	3	2	1	0	
Points for Category 4	1	0			

There was also a mountains classification, the leadership of which was marked by a purple jersey. In the mountains classification, points towards the classification were won by reaching the top of a climb before other cyclists. Each climb was categorised as either first, second, third, or fourth-category, with more points available for the higher-categorised climbs. Double points were also awarded for the premier first-category climb on the final stage.

Additionally, there was a sprints classification, which awarded a white jersey. In the points classification, cyclists received points for finishing in the top 20 in a stage. For winning a stage, a rider earned 20 points, with a point fewer per place down to 1 point for 20th place. The fourth and final jersey represented the active rider classification, marked by a blue jersey. This was decided at the race's intermediate sprints, awarding points on a 3–2–1 scale.

There was also a classification for Polish riders, with the highest-placed rider appearing on the podium each day. As well as this, a teams classification was also calculated, in which the times of the best three cyclists per team on each stage were added together; the leading team at the end of the race was the team with the lowest total time.

Stage	Winner	General classification (Polish: Żółta koszulka)	Sprints classification (Polish: Klasyfikacja sprinterska)	Mountains classification (Polish: Klasyfikacja górska)	Active rider classification (Polish: Klasyfikacja najaktywniejszych)	Polish rider classification (Polish: Najlepszy Polak)	Teams classification (Polish: Klasyfikacja drużynowa)
1	Peter Sagan	Peter Sagan	Peter Sagan	Martijn Keizer	Martijn Keizer	Paweł Franczak	Gazprom–RusVelo
2	Sacha Modolo	Danny van Poppel	Danny van Poppel	Martijn Keizer	Adrian Kurek	Kamil Gradek	Team Dimension Data
3	Dylan Teuns	Peter Sagan	Peter Sagan	Maciej Paterski	Adrian Kurek	Rafał Majka	Bora–Hansgrohe
4	Caleb Ewan	Peter Sagan	Peter Sagan	Maciej Paterski	Bert-Jan Lindeman	Rafał Majka	Bora–Hansgrohe
5	Danny van Poppel	Peter Sagan	Peter Sagan	Maxime Monfort	Bert-Jan Lindeman	Rafał Majka	Bora–Hansgrohe
6	Jack Haig	Dylan Teuns	Peter Sagan	Antwan Tolhoek	Bert-Jan Lindeman	Rafał Majka	Lotto–Soudal
7	Wout Poels	Dylan Teuns	Peter Sagan	Diego Rosa	Bert-Jan Lindeman	Rafał Majka	Lotto–Soudal
Final		Dylan Teuns	Peter Sagan	Diego Rosa	Bert-Jan Lindeman	Rafał Majka	Lotto–Soudal
