= Matthew Teggart =

Irish racing cyclist

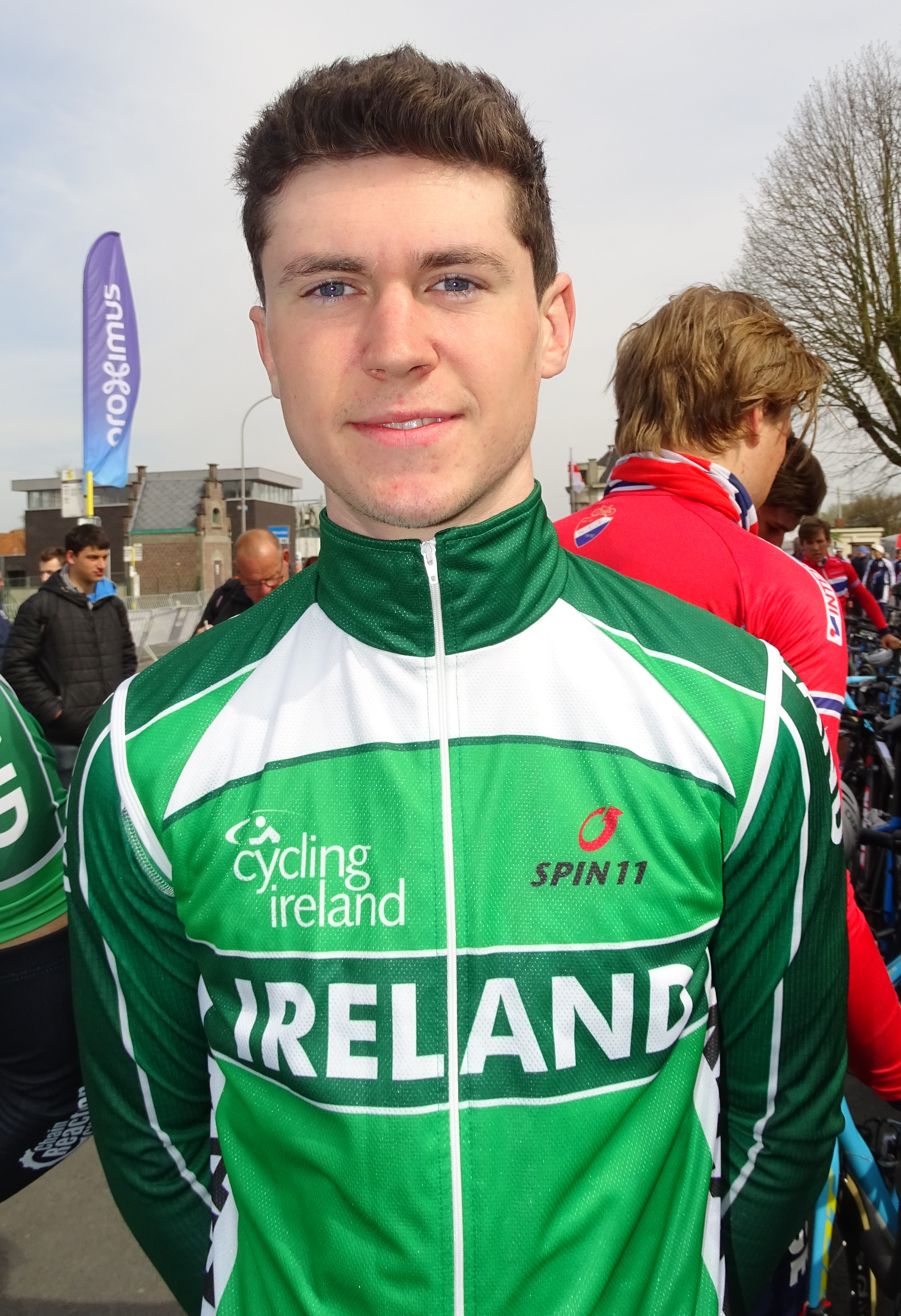
- Teggart in 2016

Personal information
- Full name: Matthew Teggart
- Born: 8 January 1996 (age 30) Banbridge, Northern Ireland

Cycling career
- Sport: Cycling
- Current team: WiV SunGod
- Discipline: Road
- Role: Rider

Amateur teams
- 2015–2016: AC Bisontine
- 2020: AC Bisontine
- 2021: VC Villefranche Beaujolais

Professional teams
- 2017: An Post–Chain Reaction
- 2018: WIGGINS
- 2019: EvoPro Racing
- 2022–: WiV SunGod

Matthew Teggart (born 8 January 1996) is a retired road racing cyclist from Banbridge, Northern Ireland. He rode for teams including An Post–Chain Reaction, Team Wiggins Le Col and WiV SunGod. He took one victory on the UCI Europe Tour and won the Sprints competition at the 2022 Tour of Britain.

== Career ==
=== Team history ===
Teggart started his career at amateur French team AC Bisontine in 2015. He turned professional in 2017 with Irish team An Post–Chain Reaction which folded at the end of the season. He moved to Team Wiggins for 2018 and spent the last year of his first stint in the professional ranks at EvoPro Racing in 2019.

He returned to AC Bisontine in 2020 and spent 2021 at another French amateur team, VC Villefranche Beaujolais. His final season in team colours prior to retirement saw him return to the professional ranks with WiV SunGod in 2022.

=== Notable results ===
Teggart has one professional cycling victory, winning a stage of the 2017 An Post Rás riding for An Post–Chain Reaction. In addition to winning stage three, Teggart had two other top-ten stage results in the race and finished ninth in the general classification.

He won the Sprints classification at the 2022 Tour of Britain. Teggart took the lead in the competition on stage one and held it until the race was declared finished due to the death of Queen Elizabeth II with five of the eight stages completed.

Teggart narrowly missed out on a medal in the Men's Road Race at the 2022 Commonwealth Games in Birmingham, England. The race finished in a sprint, with Teggart losing out to Scotland's Finn Crockett in a photo finish for 3rd place.

He contested the Irish National Championships Road Race on five occasions, with a best finish of fourth in 2021. He also had top-ten finishes on the UCI Europe Tour at the 2018 Paris–Arras Tour and Paris–Troyes in 2022, and won the Shay Elliott Memorial Race in 2021.

=== Retirement ===
Teggart's last start in a recognised race was at the Cycling Ulster Road Championship in August 2023. He has subsequently noted on Instagram that he is now an ex-pro cyclist and works as an endurance coach.

== Major results ==
2017 (1 pro win)
9th Overall An Post Rás

1st Stage 3

2018
10th Overall Paris–Arras Tour
2021
1st Shay Elliott Memorial Race
2022
1st Sprints classification, Tour of Britain
4th Road race, Commonwealth Games
4th Paris–Troyes
