= 2016 Volta Limburg Classic =

2016 Hel van het Mergelland
Race details
- Dates: 2 April 2016
- Stages: 1
- Distance: 198.6 km (123.4 mi)
- Winning time: 4h 56' 29"

Results
	Winner	Floris Gerts (NED)
	Second	Sonny Colbrelli (ITA)
	Third	Philippe Gilbert (BEL)

The 2016 Volta Limburg Classic was the 43rd edition of the Volta Limburg Classic cycle race and was held on 2 April 2016. The race started and finished in Eijsden. The race was won by Floris Gerts.

== General classification ==
Final general classification

Rank	Rider	Time
1	Floris Gerts (NED)	4h 56' 29"
2	Sonny Colbrelli (ITA)	+ 0"
3	Philippe Gilbert (BEL)	+ 2"
4	Rick Zabel (GER)	+ 2"
5	Iuri Filosi (ITA)	+ 2"
6	Huub Duyn (NED)	+ 2"
7	Krister Hagen (NOR)	+ 2"
8	Olivier Pardini (BEL)	+ 2"
9	Loïc Vliegen (BEL)	+ 6"
10	Dylan Teuns (BEL)	+ 12"
