= Mathijs Paasschens =

Dutch cyclist (born 1996)

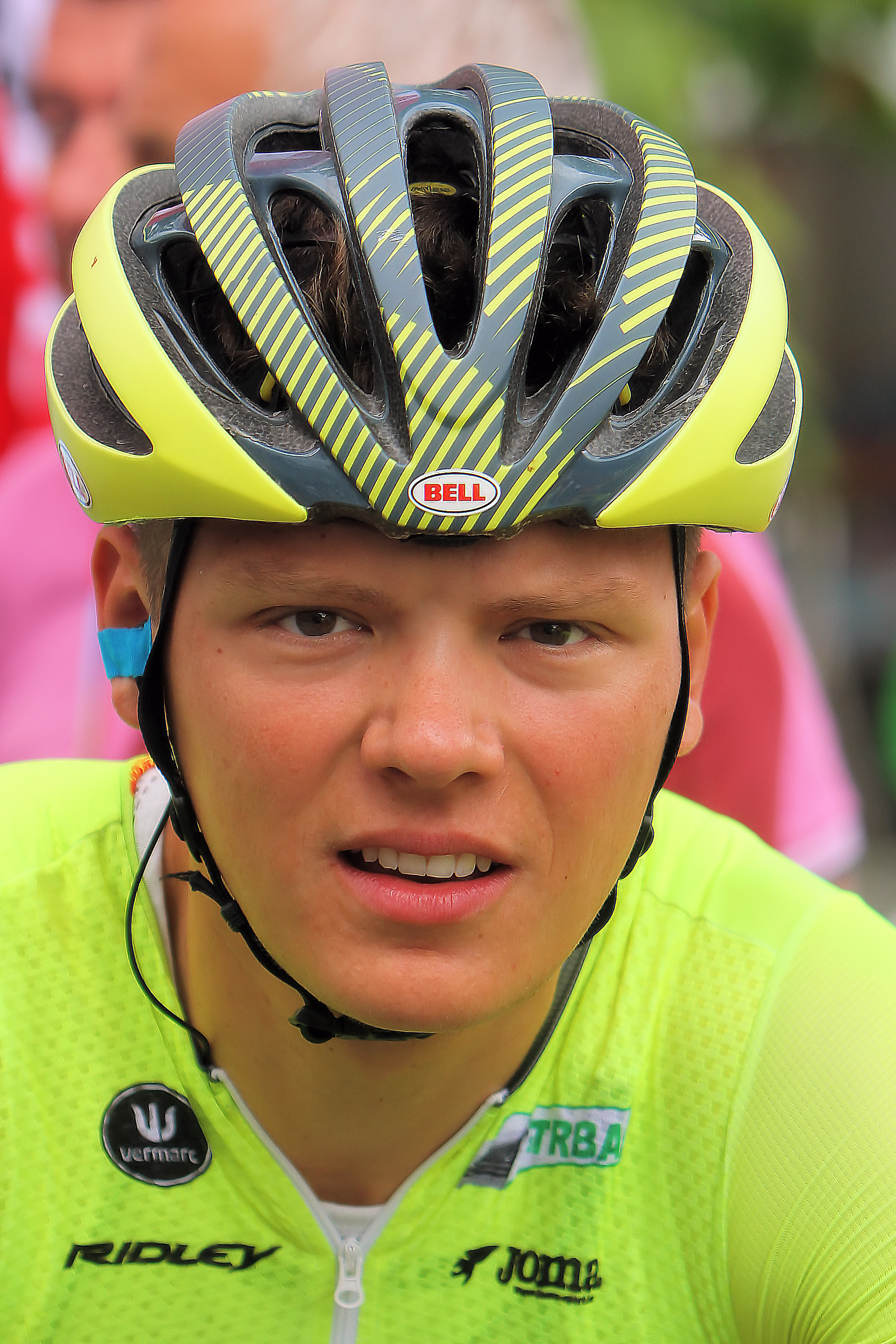
- Paasschens at the 2019 Tour of Austria

Personal information
- Born: 18 March 1996 (age 30) Rotterdam, Netherlands
- Height: 1.88 m (6 ft 2 in)
- Weight: 75 kg (165 lb)

Cycling career
- Sport: Cycling
- Current team: Team Bahrain Victorious
- Discipline: Road
- Role: Rider

Amateur teams
- 2014: Wim Ruelens Olympia Tienen
- 2015–2016: Royal Cureghem Sportief VZW
- 2017–2018: Home Solutions–Anmapa

Professional teams
- 2019–2022: Wallonie Bruxelles
- 2023–2024: Lotto–Dstny
- 2025–: Team Bahrain Victorious

Mathijs Paasschens (born 18 March 1996 in Rotterdam) is a Dutch cyclist, who currently rides for UCI WorldTeam Team Bahrain Victorious.

== Major results ==
2018
2nd Grand Prix Albert Fauville
3rd Grand Prix des Marbriers
4th Paris–Tours Espoirs
5th Flèche Ardennaise
6th Memorial Philippe Van Coningsloo
2019
1st Overall Kreiz Breizh Elites

1st Points classification
1st Stage 2

6th Paris–Camembert
9th Volta Limburg Classic
2021
10th Paris–Troyes
2022
7th Overall Tour of Britain

1st Mountains classification

=== Grand Tour general classification results timeline ===
Grand Tour	2025
Giro d'Italia	—
Tour de France	—
Vuelta a España	82
