= 2017 Volta a la Comunitat Valenciana =

UCI Europe Tour

Race details
- Dates: 1–5 February 2017
- Stages: 5
- Distance: 609 km (378.4 mi)
- Winning time: 14h 42' 51"

Results
Jersey awarded to the overall winner	Winner	Nairo Quintana (Colombia)	(Movistar Team)
	Second	Ben Hermans (Belgium)	(BMC Racing Team)
	Third	Manuel Senni (Italy)	(BMC Racing Team)
Jersey awarded to the mountains classification winner	Mountains	Cyril Gautier (France)	(AG2R La Mondiale)
Jersey awarded to the youth classification winner	Youth	Manuel Senni (Italy)	(BMC Racing Team)
Jersey awarded to the combination classification winner	Combination	Philippe Gilbert (Belgium)	(Quick-Step Floors)
Jersey awarded to the sprints classification winner	Sprints	Cyril Gautier (France)	(AG2R La Mondiale)
	Team	Movistar Team	

The 2017 Volta a la Comunitat Valenciana (transl. 2017 Tour of the Valencian Community) was a road cycling stage race that took place in the Valencian Community between 1 and 5 February 2017. The race was rated as a 2.1 event as part of the 2017 UCI Europe Tour, and was the 68th edition of the Volta a la Comunitat Valenciana.

The race was won by Colombian rider Nairo Quintana for the Movistar Team, who took the race lead on the penultimate day after winning the queen stage of the race atop the Alto Mas de la Costa. The podium was completed by a pair of BMC Racing Team riders, having assumed their positions after a first-day team time trial victory; Ben Hermans finished 13 seconds behind Quintana in second, with Manuel Senni finishing third – winning the white jersey for the young rider classification as a result – a further 19 seconds in arrears. In the race's other classifications, Cyril Gautier (AG2R La Mondiale) won both the sprints and mountains classifications, Philippe Gilbert won the combination classification – for the best positioning over all classifications – for Quick-Step Floors, while the Movistar Team won the teams classification.

== Teams ==
25 teams were invited to take part in the race. These included twelve UCI WorldTeams, seven UCI Professional Continental teams, five UCI Continental teams and a Spanish national team.

UCI WorldTeams

- AG2R La Mondiale
- Astana
- BMC Racing Team
- Cannondale–Drapac
- Team Dimension Data
- FDJ
- Team Katusha–Alpecin
- LottoNL–Jumbo
- Movistar Team
- Orica–Scott
- Quick-Step Floors
- Team Sky

UCI Professional Continental teams

- Caja Rural–Seguros RGA
- CCC–Sprandi–Polkowice
- Cofidis
- Direct Énergie
- Gazprom–RusVelo
- Israel Cycling Academy
- Roompot–Nederlandse Loterij

UCI Continental teams

- Burgos BH
- Euskadi Basque Country–Murias
- Inteja Dominican Cycling Team
- Team Ukyo
- W52 / FC Porto / Mestre da Cor

National teams

- Spain

== Route ==
Stage schedule
Stage	Date	Route	Distance	Type	Winner
1	1 February	Orihuela to Orihuela	37.9 km (24 mi)	Team time trial	BMC Racing Team
2	2 February	Alicante to Dénia	180.6 km (112 mi)	Hilly stage	Tony Martin (GER)
3	3 February	Canals to Riba-roja de Túria	161 km (100 mi)	Flat stage	Magnus Cort (DNK)
4	4 February	Segorbe to Lucena del Cid	180 km (112 mi)	Mountain stage	Nairo Quintana (COL)
5	5 February	Paterna to Valencia	49.5 km (31 mi) (Note: Stage reduced from 130.2 km (81 mi) due to strong winds.)	Flat stage	Bryan Coquard (FRA)

== Stages ==
=== Stage 1 ===
1 February 2017 — Orihuela to Orihuela, 37.9 km (24 mi), team time trial (TTT)

Result of Stage 1
Rank	Team	Time
1	BMC Racing Team	43' 17"
2	Team Sky	+ 21"
3	Quick-Step Floors	+ 49"
4	Movistar Team	+ 1' 02"
5	LottoNL–Jumbo	+ 1' 12"
6	Astana	+ 1' 16"
7	FDJ	+ 1' 30"
8	Team Katusha–Alpecin	+ 1' 52"
9	Cannondale–Drapac	+ 1' 57"
10	Orica–Scott	+ 2' 00"

General classification after Stage 1
Rank	Rider	Team	Time
1	Manuel Senni (ITA)	BMC Racing Team	43' 17"
2	Michael Schär (SUI)	BMC Racing Team	+ 0"
3	Greg Van Avermaet (BEL)	BMC Racing Team	+ 0"
4	Nicolas Roche (IRL)	BMC Racing Team	+ 0"
5	Stefan Küng (SUI)	BMC Racing Team	+ 0"
6	Ben Hermans (BEL)	BMC Racing Team	+ 0"
7	Łukasz Wiśniowski (POL)	Team Sky	+ 21"
8	Philip Deignan (IRL)	Team Sky	+ 21"
9	Michał Kwiatkowski (POL)	Team Sky	+ 21"
10	Wout Poels (NED)	Team Sky	+ 21"

=== Stage 2 ===
2 February 2017 — Alicante to Dénia, 180.6 km (112 mi)

Result of Stage 2
Rank	Rider	Team	Time
1	Tony Martin (GER)	Team Katusha–Alpecin	4h 44' 35"
2	Pim Ligthart (NED)	Roompot–Nederlandse Loterij	+ 11"
3	Primož Roglič (SLO)	LottoNL–Jumbo	+ 11"
4	David de la Cruz (ESP)	Quick-Step Floors	+ 11"
5	Michele Scarponi (ITA)	Astana	+ 11"
6	Amaro Antunes (POR)	W52 / FC Porto / Mestre da Cor	+ 11"
7	Nairo Quintana (COL)	Movistar Team	+ 11"
8	Greg Van Avermaet (BEL)	BMC Racing Team	+ 19"
9	Philippe Gilbert (BEL)	Quick-Step Floors	+ 19"
10	Kristian Sbaragli (ITA)	Team Dimension Data	+ 19"

General classification after Stage 2
Rank	Rider	Team	Time
1	Greg Van Avermaet (BEL)	BMC Racing Team	5h 28' 11"
2	Manuel Senni (ITA)	BMC Racing Team	+ 0"
3	Ben Hermans (BEL)	BMC Racing Team	+ 0"
4	David López (ESP)	Team Sky	+ 21"
5	Nicolas Roche (IRL)	BMC Racing Team	+ 37"
6	David de la Cruz (ESP)	Quick-Step Floors	+ 40"
7	Philippe Gilbert (BEL)	Quick-Step Floors	+ 49"
8	Zdeněk Štybar (CZE)	Quick-Step Floors	+ 49"
9	Dan Martin (IRL)	Quick-Step Floors	+ 49"
10	Nairo Quintana (COL)	Movistar Team	+ 54"

=== Stage 3 ===
3 February 2017 — Canals to Riba-roja de Túria, 161 km (100 mi)

Result of Stage 3
Rank	Rider	Team	Time
1	Magnus Cort (DNK)	Orica–Scott	3h 49' 02"
2	Nacer Bouhanni (FRA)	Cofidis	+ 0"
3	Bryan Coquard (FRA)	Direct Énergie	+ 0"
4	Yves Lampaert (BEL)	Quick-Step Floors	+ 0"
5	Enrique Sanz (ESP)	Spain (national team)	+ 0"
6	Samuel Caldeira (POR)	W52 / FC Porto / Mestre da Cor	+ 0"
7	Oliver Naesen (BEL)	AG2R La Mondiale	+ 0"
8	Zak Dempster (AUS)	Israel Cycling Academy	+ 0"
9	Greg Van Avermaet (BEL)	BMC Racing Team	+ 0"
10	Vyacheslav Kuznetsov (RUS)	Team Katusha–Alpecin	+ 0"

General classification after Stage 3
Rank	Rider	Team	Time
1	Greg Van Avermaet (BEL)	BMC Racing Team	9h 17' 13"
2	Ben Hermans (BEL)	BMC Racing Team	+ 0"
3	Manuel Senni (ITA)	BMC Racing Team	+ 7"
4	David López (ESP)	Team Sky	+ 28"
5	Nicolas Roche (IRL)	BMC Racing Team	+ 44"
6	David de la Cruz (ESP)	Quick-Step Floors	+ 48"
7	Zdeněk Štybar (CZE)	Quick-Step Floors	+ 49"
8	Philippe Gilbert (BEL)	Quick-Step Floors	+ 49"
9	Nairo Quintana (COL)	Movistar Team	+ 54"
10	Dan Martin (IRL)	Quick-Step Floors	+ 56"

=== Stage 4 ===
4 February 2017 — Segorbe to Llucena, 180 km (112 mi)

Result of Stage 4
Rank	Rider	Team	Time
1	Nairo Quintana (COL)	Movistar Team	5h 02' 19"
2	Merhawi Kudus (ERI)	Team Dimension Data	+ 40"
3	Amaro Antunes (POR)	W52 / FC Porto / Mestre da Cor	+ 45"
4	Wout Poels (NED)	Team Sky	+ 48"
5	Primož Roglič (SLO)	LottoNL–Jumbo	+ 57"
6	Dan Martin (IRL)	Quick-Step Floors	+ 1' 07"
7	Ben Hermans (BEL)	BMC Racing Team	+ 1' 07"
8	Steven Kruijswijk (NED)	LottoNL–Jumbo	+ 1' 10"
9	Jakob Fuglsang (DNK)	Astana	+ 1' 13"
10	Davide Formolo (ITA)	Cannondale–Drapac	+ 1' 17"

General classification after Stage 4
Rank	Rider	Team	Time
1	Nairo Quintana (COL)	Movistar Team	14h 20' 26"
2	Ben Hermans (BEL)	BMC Racing Team	+ 13"
3	Manuel Senni (ITA)	BMC Racing Team	+ 32"
4	Wout Poels (NED)	Team Sky	+ 52"
5	Dan Martin (IRL)	Quick-Step Floors	+ 1' 09"
6	Jakob Fuglsang (DNK)	Astana	+ 1' 42"
7	David de la Cruz (ESP)	Quick-Step Floors	+ 1' 53"
8	Steven Kruijswijk (NED)	LottoNL–Jumbo	+ 2' 12"
9	Merhawi Kudus (ERI)	Team Dimension Data	+ 2' 13"
10	Jonathan Castroviejo (ESP)	Movistar Team	+ 2' 25"

=== Stage 5 ===
5 February 2017 — Paterna to Valencia, 49.5 km (31 mi)

Result of Stage 5
Rank	Rider	Team	Time
1	Bryan Coquard (FRA)	Direct Énergie	1h 01' 23"
2	Nacer Bouhanni (FRA)	Cofidis	+ 0"
3	Coen Vermeltfoort (NED)	Roompot–Nederlandse Loterij	+ 0"
4	Yves Lampaert (BEL)	Quick-Step Floors	+ 0"
5	Iljo Keisse (BEL)	Quick-Step Floors	+ 0"
6	Vyacheslav Kuznetsov (RUS)	Team Katusha–Alpecin	+ 0"
7	Magnus Cort (DNK)	Orica–Scott	+ 0"
8	Guillaume Boivin (CAN)	Israel Cycling Academy	+ 0"
9	Enrique Sanz (ESP)	Spain (national team)	+ 0"
10	Kristian Sbaragli (ITA)	Team Dimension Data	+ 0"

Final general classification
Rank	Rider	Team	Time
1	Nairo Quintana (COL)	Movistar Team	15h 21' 49"
2	Ben Hermans (BEL)	BMC Racing Team	+ 13"
3	Manuel Senni (ITA)	BMC Racing Team	+ 32"
4	Wout Poels (NED)	Team Sky	+ 52"
5	Dan Martin (IRL)	Quick-Step Floors	+ 1' 09"
6	Jakob Fuglsang (DNK)	Astana	+ 1' 42"
7	David de la Cruz (ESP)	Quick-Step Floors	+ 1' 53"
8	Steven Kruijswijk (NED)	LottoNL–Jumbo	+ 2' 12"
9	Merhawi Kudus (ERI)	Team Dimension Data	+ 2' 13"
10	Jonathan Castroviejo (ESP)	Movistar Team	+ 2' 25"

== Classification leadership table ==
In the 2017 Volta a la Comunitat Valenciana, five different jerseys were awarded. For the general classification, calculated by adding each cyclist's finishing times on each stage, and allowing time bonuses for the first three finishers at intermediate sprints and at the finish of mass-start stages, the leader received a yellow jersey. This classification was considered the most important of the 2017 Volta a la Comunitat Valenciana, and the winner of the classification was considered the winner of the race.

Additionally, there was a sprints classification, which awarded a green jersey. Points towards the classification were accrued at intermediate sprint points during each stage; these intermediate sprints also offered bonus seconds towards the general classification. There was also a mountains classification, the leadership of which was marked by a red jersey with white polka dots. In the mountains classification, points were won by reaching the top of a climb before other cyclists, with more points available for the higher-categorised climbs.

The fourth jersey represented the young rider classification, marked by a white jersey. This was decided in the same way as the general classification, but only riders born after 1 January 1992 were eligible to be ranked in the classification. There was also a classification for teams, in which the times of the best three cyclists per team on each stage were added together; the leading team at the end of the race was the team with the lowest total time. In addition, there was a combination classification, calculated by adding the numeral ranks of each cyclist in the general, sprints and mountains classifications – a rider must have scored in all classifications possible to qualify for the combination classification – with the lowest cumulative total signifying the winner of this competition.

Stage	Winner	General classification	Sprints classification	Mountains classification	Combination classification	Young rider classification	Teams classification
1	BMC Racing Team	Manuel Senni	not awarded	Michał Kwiatkowski	Michał Kwiatkowski	Manuel Senni	BMC Racing Team
2	Tony Martin	Greg Van Avermaet	Cyril Gautier	Johann van Zyl	Cyril Gautier	Manuel Senni	BMC Racing Team
3	Magnus Cort	Greg Van Avermaet	Cyril Gautier	Johann van Zyl	Cyril Gautier	Manuel Senni	BMC Racing Team
4	Nairo Quintana	Nairo Quintana	Cyril Gautier	Cyril Gautier	Philippe Gilbert	Manuel Senni	Movistar Team
5	Bryan Coquard	Nairo Quintana	Cyril Gautier	Cyril Gautier	Philippe Gilbert	Manuel Senni	Movistar Team
Final		Nairo Quintana	Cyril Gautier	Cyril Gautier	Philippe Gilbert	Manuel Senni	Movistar Team
