= 2023 Grand Prix de Wallonie =

2023 UCI ProSeries
- Event poster with previous winner Mathieu van der Poel

Race details
- Dates: 13 September 2023
- Stages: 1
- Distance: 201.3 km (125.1 mi)
- Winning time: 4h 42' 11"

Results
	Winner	Gonzalo Serrano (ESP)	(Movistar Team)
	Second	Dylan Teuns (BEL)	(Israel–Premier Tech)
	Third	Jasper De Buyst (BEL)	(Lotto–Dstny)

The 2023 Grand Prix de Wallonie was the 63rd edition of the Grand Prix de Wallonie road cycling one day race, which was held on 13 September 2023 as part of the 2023 UCI ProSeries calendar.

== Teams ==
Eight of the 18 UCI WorldTeams, nine UCI ProTeams, and four UCI Continental teams made up the twenty-one teams that competed in the race.

UCI WorldTeams

- AG2R Citroën Team
- Alpecin–Deceuninck
- Arkéa–Samsic
- Cofidis
- Intermarché–Circus–Wanty
- Movistar Team
- Team Jayco–AlUla
- UAE Team Emirates

UCI ProTeams

- Bingoal WB
- Human Powered Health
- Israel–Premier Tech
- Lotto–Dstny
- Q36.5 Pro Cycling Team
- Team Flanders–Baloise
- Team TotalEnergies
- Tudor Pro Cycling Team
- Uno-X Pro Cycling Team

UCI Continental Teams

- Hagens Berman Axeon
- Matériel-vélo.com
- Saint Piran
- Van Rysel–Roubaix–Lille Métropole

== Result ==
Result
Rank	Rider	Team	Time
1	Gonzalo Serrano (ESP)	Movistar Team	4h 42' 11"
2	Dylan Teuns (BEL)	Israel–Premier Tech	+ 0"
3	Jasper De Buyst (BEL)	Lotto–Dstny	+ 3"
4	Mathieu van der Poel (NED)	Alpecin–Deceuninck	+ 3"
5	Fabio Christen (SUI)	Q36.5 Pro Cycling Team	+ 3"
6	Franck Bonnamour (FRA)	AG2R Citroën Team	+ 3"
7	Biniam Girmay (ERI)	Intermarché–Circus–Wanty	+ 3"
8	Julien Simon (FRA)	Team TotalEnergies	+ 3"
9	Ewen Costiou (FRA)	Arkéa–Samsic	+ 3"
10	Rick Pluimers (NED)	Tudor Pro Cycling Team	+ 3"
