= Gonzalo Serrano =

Spanish cyclist

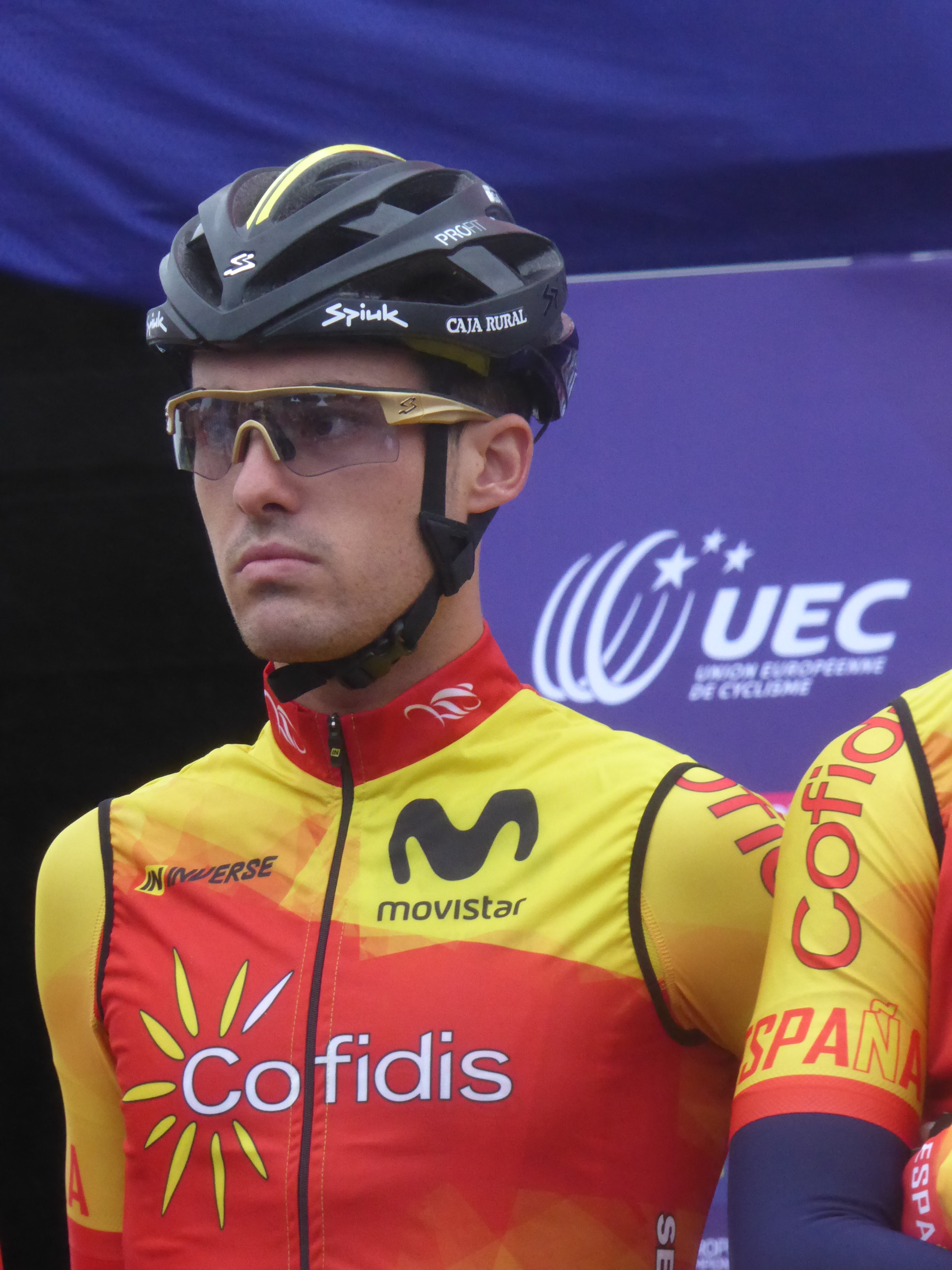
- Serrano at the 2018 European Road Cycling Championships

Personal information
- Full name: Gonzalo Serrano Rodríguez
- Born: 17 August 1994 (age 32) Madrid, Spain

Cycling career
- Sport: Cycling
- Current team: Movistar Team
- Discipline: Road
- Role: Rider

Amateur teams
- 2013–2014: Super Froiz
- 2015–2016: EC Magro
- 2017: Caja Rural–Seguros RGA amateur

Professional teams
- 2017: Caja Rural–Seguros RGA (stagiaire)
- 2018–2020: Caja Rural–Seguros RGA
- 2021–: Movistar Team

Major wins
- Stage races Tour of Britain (2022) One-day races and Classics GP de Wallonie (2023)

Gonzalo Serrano Rodríguez (born 17 August 1994) is a Spanish cyclist, who rides for UCI WorldTeam Movistar Team.

Since turning professional, Serrano has taken five victories – the 2023 Grand Prix de Wallonie one-day race, two stage wins at the Vuelta a Andalucía in 2020 and 2021, as well a stage win and the general classification at the shortened 2022 Tour of Britain, which was abandoned after five stages due to the death of Elizabeth II.

== Major results ==
2016
2nd Time trial, National Under-23 Road Championships
2018
6th Clássica da Arrábida
2019
8th Overall Tour of Turkey
8th Clássica da Arrábida
2020 (1 pro win)
1st Stage 2 Vuelta a Andalucía
1st Mountains classification, Volta a la Comunitat Valenciana
6th La Drôme Classic
10th Trofeo Matteotti
Combativity award Stage 2 Vuelta a España
2021 (1)
1st Stage 1 Vuelta a Andalucía
3rd Vuelta a Murcia
4th Road race, National Road Championships
7th Prueba Villafranca de Ordizia
8th Trofeo Serra de Tramuntana
2022 (2)
1st Overall Tour of Britain

1st Stage 4

3rd Grand Prix de Wallonie
2023 (1)
1st Grand Prix de Wallonie
9th Trofeo Andratx–Mirador D'es Colomer
10th Circuito de Getxo
2025
9th Boucles de l'Aulne

=== Grand Tour general classification results timeline ===
Grand Tour	2019	2020
Giro d'Italia	—	—
Tour de France	—	—
Vuelta a España	135	57

Legend
—	Did not compete
DNF	Did not finish
