= List of protected heritage sites in Marchin =

This table shows an overview of the protected heritage sites in the Walloon town Marchin. This list is part of Belgium's national heritage.

Object	Year/architect	Town/section	Address	Coordinates	Number^{?}	Image
Church of Notre-Dame ^{(nl)} ^{(fr)}		Marchin		50.463042°N 5.240707°E	61039-CLT-0001-01 Info	Onze-Lieve-vrouwekerk ('Notre-Dame')
Linden tree called tilleul de Belgrade ^{(nl)} ^{(fr)}		Marchin		50.489223°N 5.227747°E	61039-CLT-0004-01 Info	
Château Belle-Maison: Interior and exterior: park, church, rectory and surroundings ^{(nl)} ^{(fr)}		Marchin	place de Belle Maison n° 6	50.482560°N 5.223519°E	61039-CLT-0005-01 Info	Kasteel Belle-Maison: interieur en exterieur: park, kerk, pastorie en omgeving
domein van Bagatelle ^{(nl)} ^{(fr)}		Marchin		50.431481°N 5.245315°E	61039-CLT-0006-01 Info	

== See also ==
- List of protected heritage sites in Liège (province)
