= 2022 Tour of Britain =

2022 UCI ProSeries
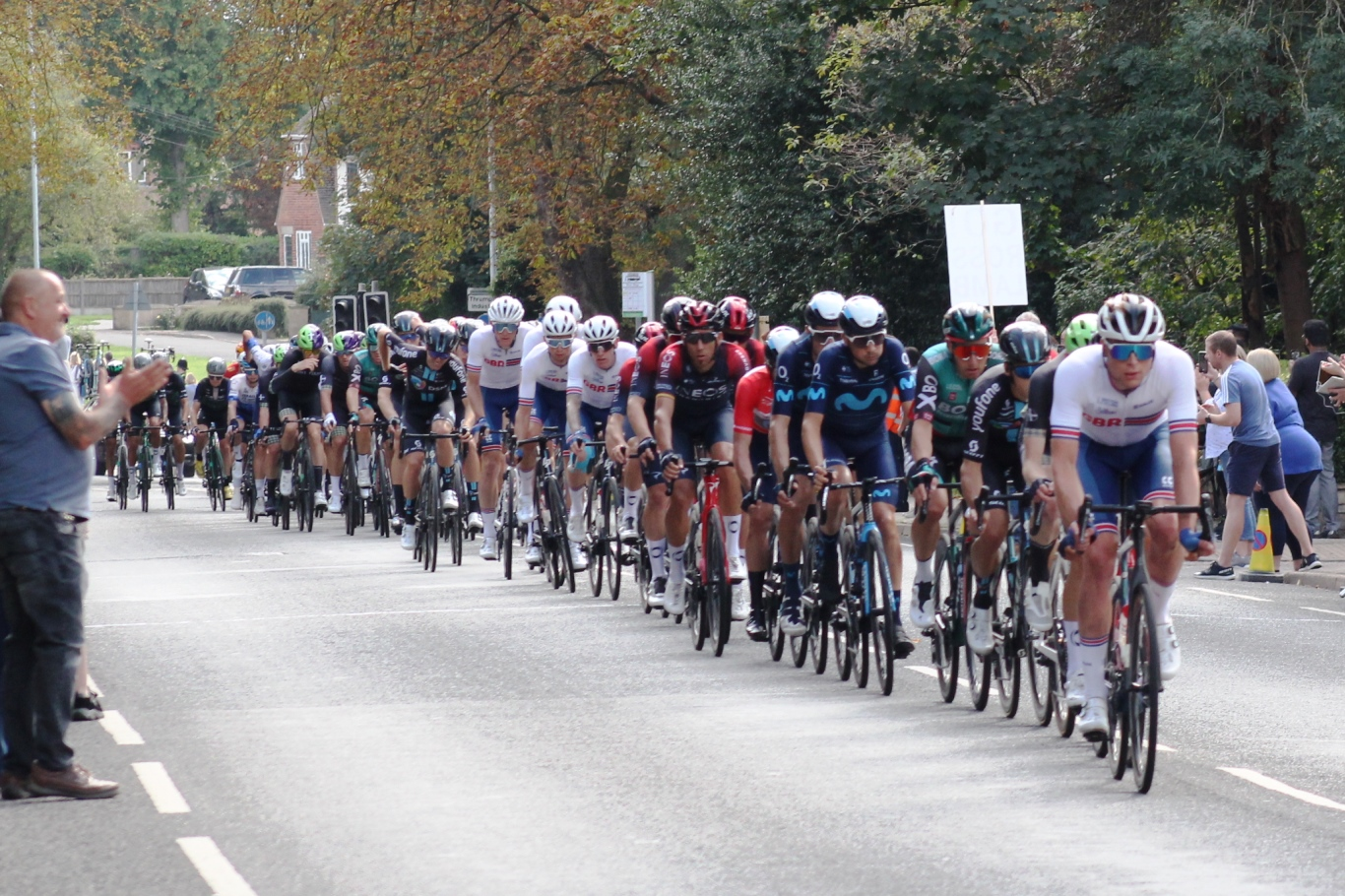
- Stage 5 in Retford

Race details
- Dates: 4 – 8 September 2022
- Stages: 5

Results
| Jersey awarded to the overall winner | Winner | Gonzalo Serrano (ESP) | (Movistar Team) |
| | Second | Tom Pidcock (GBR) | (INEOS Grenadiers) |
| | Third | Omar Fraile (ESP) | (INEOS Grenadiers) |
| Jersey awarded to the points classification winner | Points | Tom Pidcock (GBR) | (INEOS Grenadiers) |
| Jersey awarded to the mountains classification winner | Mountains | Mathijs Paasschens (NED) | (Bingoal Pauwels Sauces WB) |
| Jersey awarded to the sprints classification winner | Sprints | Matthew Teggart (IRL) | (WiV SunGod) |
| | Team | (United Kingdom) INEOS Grenadiers | |

The 2022 Tour of Britain was a men's professional road cycling stage race. It was the eighteenth running of the modern version of the Tour of Britain and the 81st British tour in total. The race was part of the 2022 UCI ProSeries.

The Tour of Britain started on 4 September in Aberdeen. The race had been scheduled for eight stages, concluding on 11 September on the Isle of Wight, the first planned finish on the island. On 8 September, the race was cancelled and declared complete after five stages due to the death of Elizabeth II.

== Route ==
On 1 October 2021, the start and finish venues were announced, with the Grand Départ leaving Aberdeen on 4 September 2022 and the final stage held on the Isle of Wight on 11 September. The tour was to visit Dorset for the first time, and return to Yorkshire for the first time since 2009. Nottinghamshire was to host one of the midweek stages.

On 8 September, the final three stages of the race were cancelled due to the death of Elizabeth II. The race was declared complete, with classifications after the fifth stage considered the final result.

Stage characteristics and winners
| Stage | Date | Course | Distance | Type | Winner |
|---|---|---|---|---|---|
| 1 | 4 September | Aberdeen to Glenshee Ski Centre | 181.3 km | Intermediate stage | Corbin Strong (NZL) |
| 2 | 5 September | Hawick to Duns | 175.2 km | Hilly stage | Cees Bol (NED) |
| 3 | 6 September | Durham to Sunderland | 163.6 km | Hilly stage | Kamiel Bonneu (BEL) |
| 4 | 7 September | Redcar to Duncombe Park, Helmsley | 149.5 km | Hilly stage | Gonzalo Serrano (ESP) |
| 5 | 8 September | West Bridgford to Mansfield | 186.8 km | Flat stage | Jordi Meeus (BEL) |
| Total | | | 856.4 km (532.1 mi) | | |

=== Cancelled stages ===
Stage characteristics
| Stage | Date | Course | Distance |
|---|---|---|---|
| 6 | 9 September | Tewkesbury to Gloucester | 170.9 km |
| 7 | 10 September | West Bay to Ferndown | 175.9 km |
| 8 | 11 September | Ryde to The Needles | 148.9 km |

== Stages ==
=== Stage 1 ===
4 September 2022 — Aberdeen to Glenshee Ski Centre, 181.3 km (112.7 mi)

After over 110 miles the race finished with a nine kilometre climb up the Old Military Road to the Glenshee ski station. Neo-Pro Corbin Strong from New Zealand beat two Spanish cyclists at the finish.

Stage 1 Result
| Rank | Rider | Team | Time |
|---|---|---|---|
| 1 | Corbin Strong (NZL) | Israel–Premier Tech | 4h 36' 37" |
| 2 | Omar Fraile (ESP) | INEOS Grenadiers | + 0" |
| 3 | Anders Halland Johannessen (NOR) | Uno-X Pro Cycling Team | + 0" |
| 4 | Gonzalo Serrano (ESP) | Movistar Team | + 0" |
| 5 | Tom Pidcock (GBR) | INEOS Grenadiers | + 0" |
| 6 | Dylan Teuns (BEL) | Israel–Premier Tech | + 0" |
| 7 | Filippo Fiorelli (ITA) | Bardiani–CSF–Faizanè | + 0" |
| 8 | Oscar Onley (GBR) | Team DSM | + 0" |
| 9 | Anthon Charmig (DEN) | Uno-X Pro Cycling Team | + 0" |
| 10 | Filippo Zana (ITA) | Bardiani–CSF–Faizanè | + 0" |

General classification after Stage 1
| Rank | Rider | Team | Time |
|---|---|---|---|
| 1 | Corbin Strong (NZL) | Israel–Premier Tech | 4h 36' 27" |
| 2 | Omar Fraile (ESP) | INEOS Grenadiers | + 4" |
| 3 | Anders Halland Johannessen (NOR) | Uno-X Pro Cycling Team | + 6" |
| 4 | Gonzalo Serrano (ESP) | Movistar Team | + 10" |
| 5 | Tom Pidcock (GBR) | INEOS Grenadiers | + 10" |
| 6 | Dylan Teuns (BEL) | Israel–Premier Tech | + 10" |
| 7 | Filippo Fiorelli (ITA) | Bardiani–CSF–Faizanè | + 10" |
| 8 | Oscar Onley (GBR) | Team DSM | + 10" |
| 9 | Anthon Charmig (DEN) | Uno-X Pro Cycling Team | + 10" |
| 10 | Filippo Zana (ITA) | Bardiani–CSF–Faizanè | + 10" |

=== Stage 2 ===
5 September 2022 — Hawick to Duns, 175.2 km (108.9 mi)

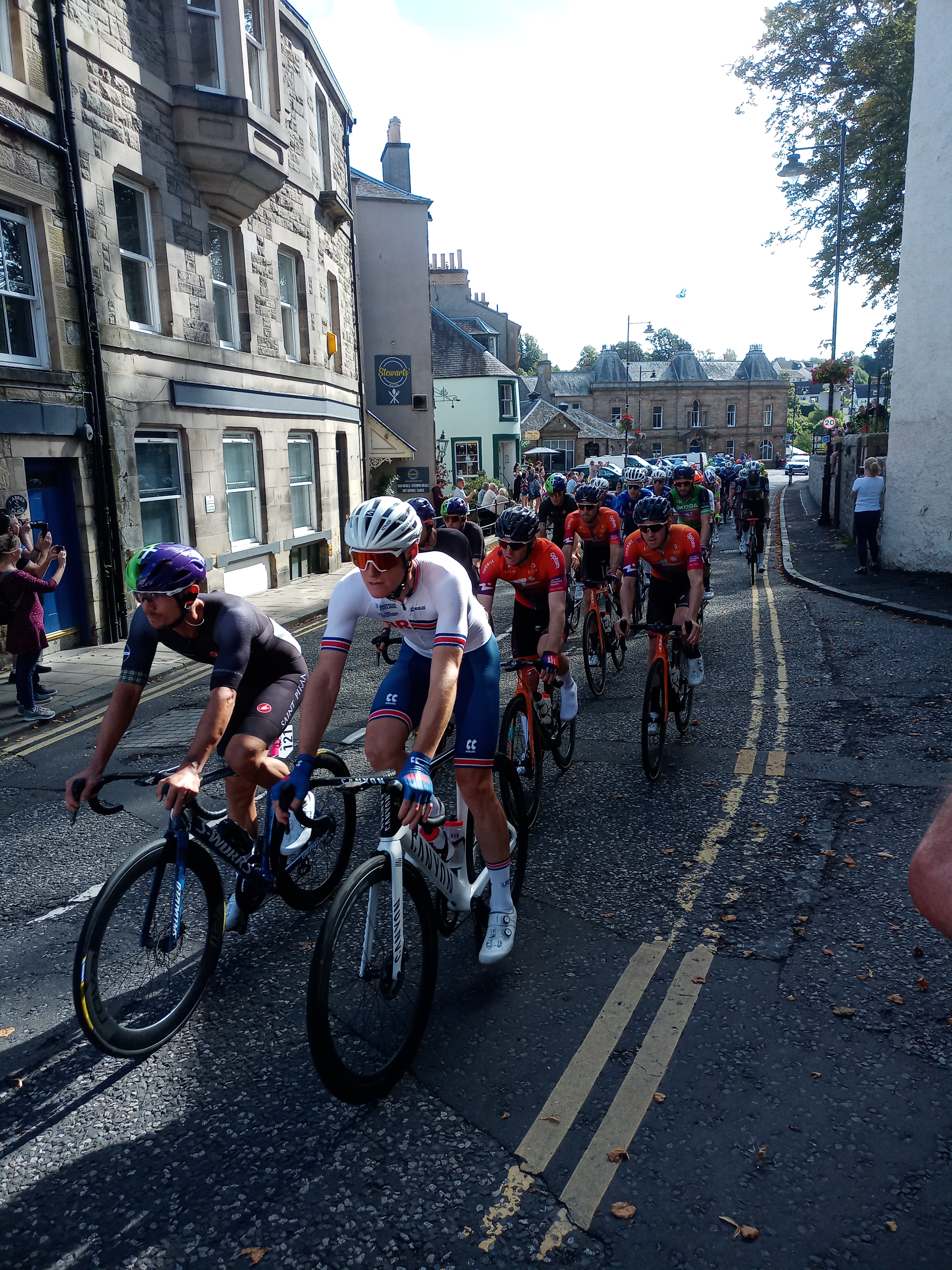
The peloton in front of Jedburgh Town Hall

The stage started at Hawick and passed through Jedburgh and Morebattle before finishing in Duns after a journey of nearly 110 miles. At the start of the stage the race leader was the New Zealand rider Corbin Strong who had won the first stage in Aberdeen.

Stage 2 Result
| Rank | Rider | Team | Time |
|---|---|---|---|
| 1 | Cees Bol (NED) | Team DSM | 4h 08' 35" |
| 2 | Jake Stewart (GBR) | Great Britain | + 0" |
| 3 | Corbin Strong (NZL) | Israel–Premier Tech | + 0" |
| 4 | Stanisław Aniołkowski (POL) | Bingoal Pauwels Sauces WB | + 0" |
| 5 | Luke Lamperti (USA) | Trinity Racing | + 0" |
| 6 | Kenneth Van Rooy (BEL) | Sport Vlaanderen–Baloise | + 0" |
| 7 | Tom Pidcock (GBR) | INEOS Grenadiers | + 0" |
| 8 | Eduard Prades (ESP) | Caja Rural–Seguros RGA | + 0" |
| 9 | Alex Dowsett (GBR) | Israel–Premier Tech | + 0" |
| 10 | Martin Marcellusi (ITA) | Bardiani–CSF–Faizanè | + 0" |

General classification after Stage 2
| Rank | Rider | Team | Time |
|---|---|---|---|
| 1 | Corbin Strong (NZL) | Israel–Premier Tech | 8h 44' 58" |
| 2 | Jake Stewart (GBR) | Great Britain | + 8" |
| 3 | Omar Fraile (ESP) | INEOS Grenadiers | + 8" |
| 4 | Anders Halland Johannessen (NOR) | Uno-X Pro Cycling Team | + 10" |
| 5 | Tom Pidcock (GBR) | INEOS Grenadiers | + 14" |
| 6 | Gonzalo Serrano (ESP) | Movistar Team | + 14" |
| 7 | Kenneth Van Rooy (BEL) | Sport Vlaanderen–Baloise | + 14" |
| 8 | Felix Großschartner (AUT) | Bora–Hansgrohe | + 14" |
| 9 | Eduard Prades (ESP) | Caja Rural–Seguros RGA | + 14" |
| 10 | Filippo Fiorelli (ITA) | Bardiani–CSF–Faizanè | + 14" |

=== Stage 3 ===
6 September 2022 — Durham to Sunderland, 163.6 km (101.7 mi)

Stage 3 Result
| Rank | Rider | Team | Time |
|---|---|---|---|
| 1 | Kamiel Bonneu (BEL) | Sport Vlaanderen–Baloise | 4h 05' 33" |
| 2 | Ben Perry (CAN) | WiV SunGod | + 0" |
| 3 | Alexandar Richardson (GBR) | Saint Piran | + 0" |
| 4 | Mathijs Paasschens (NED) | Bingoal Pauwels Sauces WB | + 0" |
| 5 | Jordi Meeus (BEL) | Bora–Hansgrohe | + 0" |
| 6 | Jake Stewart (GBR) | Great Britain | + 0" |
| 7 | Sam Watson (GBR) | Great Britain | + 0" |
| 8 | Gonzalo Serrano (ESP) | Movistar Team | + 0" |
| 9 | Marius Mayrhofer (GER) | Team DSM | + 0" |
| 10 | Kenneth Van Rooy (BEL) | Sport Vlaanderen–Baloise | + 0" |

General classification after Stage 3
| Rank | Rider | Team | Time |
|---|---|---|---|
| 1 | Ben Perry (CAN) | WiV SunGod | 12h 50' 31" |
| 2 | Corbin Strong (NZL) | Israel–Premier Tech | + 7" |
| 3 | Mathijs Paasschens (NED) | Bingoal Pauwels Sauces WB | + 11" |
| 4 | Jake Stewart (GBR) | Great Britain | + 15" |
| 5 | Omar Fraile (ESP) | INEOS Grenadiers | + 15" |
| 6 | Anders Halland Johannessen (NOR) | Uno-X Pro Cycling Team | + 17" |
| 7 | Gonzalo Serrano (ESP) | Movistar Team | + 21" |
| 8 | Tom Pidcock (GBR) | INEOS Grenadiers | + 21" |
| 9 | Kenneth Van Rooy (BEL) | Sport Vlaanderen–Baloise | + 21" |
| 10 | Filippo Fiorelli (ITA) | Bardiani–CSF–Faizanè | + 21" |

=== Stage 4 ===
7 September 2022 — Redcar to Duncombe Park, Helmsley, 149.5 km (92.9 mi)

Stage 4 Result
| Rank | Rider | Team | Time |
|---|---|---|---|
| 1 | Gonzalo Serrano (ESP) | Movistar Team | 3h 40' 38" |
| 2 | Tom Pidcock (GBR) | INEOS Grenadiers | + 0" |
| 3 | Dylan Teuns (BEL) | Israel–Premier Tech | + 0" |
| 4 | Omar Fraile (ESP) | INEOS Grenadiers | + 0" |
| 5 | Mathijs Paasschens (NED) | Bingoal Pauwels Sauces WB | + 13" |
| 6 | Samuel Watson (GBR) | Great Britain | + 13" |
| 7 | Kenneth Van Rooy (BEL) | Sport Vlaanderen–Baloise | + 13" |
| 8 | Enrico Battaglin (ITA) | Bardiani–CSF–Faizanè | + 13" |
| 9 | Jack Rootkin-Gray (GBR) | Saint Piran | + 13" |
| 10 | Corbin Strong (NZL) | Israel–Premier Tech | + 13" |

General classification after Stage 4
| Rank | Rider | Team | Time |
|---|---|---|---|
| 1 | Gonzalo Serrano (ESP) | Movistar Team | 16h 31' 15" |
| 2 | Tom Pidcock (GBR) | INEOS Grenadiers | + 7" |
| 3 | Omar Fraile (ESP) | INEOS Grenadiers | + 7" |
| 4 | Ben Perry (CAN) | WiV SunGod | + 7" |
| 5 | Dylan Teuns (BEL) | Israel–Premier Tech | + 10" |
| 6 | Corbin Strong (NZL) | Israel–Premier Tech | + 14" |
| 7 | Mathijs Paasschens (NED) | Bingoal Pauwels Sauces WB | + 18" |
| 8 | Jake Stewart (GBR) | Great Britain | + 22" |
| 9 | Magnus Sheffield (USA) | INEOS Grenadiers | + 24" |
| 10 | Kenneth Van Rooy (BEL) | Sport Vlaanderen–Baloise | + 28" |

=== Stage 5 ===
8 September 2022 — West Bridgford to Mansfield, 186.8 km (116.1 mi)

Stage 5 Result
| Rank | Rider | Team | Time |
|---|---|---|---|
| 1 | Jordi Meeus (BEL) | Bora–Hansgrohe | 4h 21' 46" |
| 2 | Stanisław Aniołkowski (POL) | Bingoal Pauwels Sauces WB | + 0" |
| 3 | Tom Pidcock (GBR) | INEOS Grenadiers | + 0" |
| 4 | Samuel Watson (GBR) | Great Britain | + 0" |
| 5 | Aaron Van Poucke (BEL) | Sport Vlaanderen–Baloise | + 0" |
| 6 | Nicolò Parisini (ITA) | Team Qhubeka | + 0" |
| 7 | Martin Marcellusi (ITA) | Bardiani–CSF–Faizanè | + 0" |
| 8 | Filippo Fiorelli (ITA) | Bardiani–CSF–Faizanè | + 0" |
| 9 | Corbin Strong (NZL) | Israel–Premier Tech | + 0" |
| 10 | Jim Brown (GBR) | WiV SunGod | + 0" |

General classification after Stage 5
| Rank | Rider | Team | Time |
|---|---|---|---|
| 1 | Gonzalo Serrano (ESP) | Movistar Team | 20h 53' 01" |
| 2 | Tom Pidcock (GBR) | INEOS Grenadiers | + 3" |
| 3 | Omar Fraile (ESP) | INEOS Grenadiers | + 7" |
| 4 | Ben Perry (CAN) | WiV SunGod | + 7" |
| 5 | Dylan Teuns (BEL) | Israel–Premier Tech | + 10" |
| 6 | Corbin Strong (NZL) | Israel–Premier Tech | + 14" |
| 7 | Mathijs Paasschens (NED) | Bingoal Pauwels Sauces WB | + 17" |
| 8 | Jake Stewart (GBR) | Great Britain | + 22" |
| 9 | Alessandro Iacchi (ITA) | Team Qhubeka | + 24" |
| 10 | Magnus Sheffield (USA) | INEOS Grenadiers | + 24" |

== Classification leadership table ==
Classification leadership by stage
| Stage | Winner | General classification | Points classification | Mountains classification | Sprints classification | Team classification |
|---|---|---|---|---|---|---|
| 1 | Corbin Strong | Corbin Strong | Corbin Strong | Stephen Bassett | Matthew Teggart | Uno-X Pro Cycling Team |
| 2 | Cees Bol | Corbin Strong | Corbin Strong | Jacob Scott | Matthew Teggart | Sport Vlaanderen–Baloise |
| 3 | Kamiel Bonneu | Ben Perry | Corbin Strong | Jacob Scott | Matthew Teggart | Sport Vlaanderen–Baloise |
| 4 | Gonzalo Serrano | Gonzalo Serrano | Corbin Strong | Mathijs Paasschens | Matthew Teggart | INEOS Grenadiers |
| 5 | Jordi Meeus | Gonzalo Serrano | Tom Pidcock | Mathijs Paasschens | Matthew Teggart | INEOS Grenadiers |
| Final | | Gonzalo Serrano | Tom Pidcock | Mathijs Paasschens | Matthew Teggart | Ineos Grenadiers |
