= 2017 Tour de Wallonie =

2017 UCI Europe Tour

Race details
- Dates: 22–26 July 2017
- Stages: 5
- Distance: 908.7 km (564.6 mi)
- Winning time: 21h 19' 34"

Results
Jersey awarded to the overall winner	Winner	Dylan Teuns (BEL)	(BMC Racing Team)
	Second	Tosh Van der Sande (BEL)	(Lotto–Soudal)
	Third	Benjamin Thomas (FRA)	(Armée de Terre)
Jersey awarded to the points classification winner	Points	Dylan Teuns (BEL)	(BMC Racing Team)
Jersey awarded to the mountains classification winner	Mountains	Alexis Gougeard (FRA)	(AG2R La Mondiale)
Jersey awarded to the youth classification winner	Youth	Benjamin Thomas (FRA)	(Armée de Terre)
Jersey awarded to the sprints classification winner	Sprints	Evaldas Šiškevičius (LTU)	(Delko–Marseille Provence KTM)
	Team	WB Veranclassic Aqua Protect	

The 2017 VOO-Tour de Wallonie was a five-stage men's professional road cycling race, held in Belgium as a 2.HC race on the 2017 UCI Europe Tour. It was the forty-fourth running of the Tour de Wallonie, starting on 22 July in Stavelot and finishing on 26 July in Thuin.

The race was won by Belgian rider Dylan Teuns (BMC Racing Team), winning two stages and the points classification alongside his overall success.

== Schedule ==
The race route was announced on 4 May 2017.

List of stages and stage characteristics
Stage	Date	Course	Distance	Type	Winner
1	22 July	Stavelot to Marchin	189.9 km (118 mi)	Hilly stage	Benjamin Thomas (FRA)
2	23 July	Chaudfontaine to Seraing	189.4 km (118 mi)	Hilly stage	Jasper De Buyst (BEL)
3	24 July	Arlon to Houffalize	182.7 km (114 mi)	Hilly stage	Dylan Teuns (BEL)
4	25 July	Brussels (Brussels Capital Region) to Profondeville	164.1 km (102 mi)	Hilly stage	Jempy Drucker (LUX)
5	26 July	Chièvres to Thuin	182.6 km (113 mi)	Hilly stage	Dylan Teuns (BEL)

== Teams ==
Initially, 19 teams were selected to take part in Tour de Wallonie. Six of these were UCI WorldTeams, with ten UCI Professional Continental teams and three UCI Continental teams. A 20th team, Professional Continental team Aqua Blue Sport were later added to the race.

UCI WorldTeams

- AG2R La Mondiale
- BMC Racing Team
- FDJ
- Lotto–Soudal
- Team Katusha–Alpecin
- LottoNL–Jumbo

UCI Professional Continental teams

- Aqua Blue Sport
- Cofidis
- Delko–Marseille Provence KTM
- Direct Énergie
- Gazprom–RusVelo
- Roompot–Nederlandse Loterij
- Sport Vlaanderen–Baloise
- Vérandas Willems–Crelan
- Wanty–Groupe Gobert
- WB Veranclassic Aqua Protect
- Fortuneo–Oscaro

UCIContinental teams

- AGO–Aqua Service
- Armée de Terre
- Telenet–Fidea Lions

== Stages ==
=== Stage 1 ===
22 July 2017 — Stavelot to Marchin, 189.9 km (118.0 mi)

Result of stage 1
Rank	Rider	Team	Time
1	Benjamin Thomas (FRA)	Armée de Terre	4h 28' 40"
2	Xandro Meurisse (BEL)	Wanty–Groupe Gobert	+ 5"
3	Dylan Teuns (BEL)	BMC Racing Team	+ 5"
4	Jelle Vanendert (BEL)	Lotto–Soudal	+ 5"
5	Tosh Van der Sande (BEL)	Lotto–Soudal	+ 5"
6	Jonas van Genechten (BEL)	Cofidis	+ 8"
7	Vyacheslav Kuznetsov (RUS)	Team Katusha–Alpecin	+ 8"
8	Pim Ligthart (NED)	Roompot–Nederlandse Loterij	+ 13"
9	Huub Duyn (NED)	Vérandas Willems–Crelan	+ 13"
10	Michel Kreder (NED)	Aqua Blue Sport	+ 13"

General classification after stage 1
Rank	Rider	Team	Time
1	Benjamin Thomas (FRA)	Armée de Terre	4h 28' 30"
2	Xandro Meurisse (BEL)	Wanty–Groupe Gobert	+ 9"
3	Dylan Teuns (BEL)	BMC Racing Team	+ 11"
4	Jelle Vanendert (BEL)	Lotto–Soudal	+ 15"
5	Tosh Van der Sande (BEL)	Lotto–Soudal	+ 15"
6	Jonas van Genechten (BEL)	Cofidis	+ 18"
7	Vyacheslav Kuznetsov (RUS)	Team Katusha–Alpecin	+ 18"
8	Pim Ligthart (NED)	Roompot–Nederlandse Loterij	+ 23"
9	Huub Duyn (NED)	Vérandas Willems–Crelan	+ 23"
10	Michel Kreder (NED)	Aqua Blue Sport	+ 23"

=== Stage 2 ===
23 July 2017 — Chaudfontaine to Seraing, 192.8 km (119.8 mi)

Result of stage 2
Rank	Rider	Team	Time
1	Jasper De Buyst (BEL)	Lotto–Soudal	4h 29' 16"
2	Michael Mørkøv (DEN)	Team Katusha–Alpecin	+ 0"
3	Justin Jules (FRA)	WB Veranclassic Aqua Protect	+ 0"
4	Jempy Drucker (LUX)	BMC Racing Team	+ 0"
5	Roman Maikin (RUS)	Gazprom–RusVelo	+ 0"
6	Juan José Lobato (ESP)	LottoNL–Jumbo	+ 0"
7	Timothy Dupont (BEL)	Vérandas Willems–Crelan	+ 0"
8	Bryan Coquard (FRA)	Direct Énergie	+ 0"
9	Piet Allegaert (BEL)	Sport Vlaanderen–Baloise	+ 0"
10	Hugo Hofstetter (FRA)	Cofidis	+ 0"

General classification after stage 2
Rank	Rider	Team	Time
1	Dylan Teuns (BEL)	BMC Racing Team	8h 57' 55"
2	Xandro Meurisse (BEL)	Wanty–Groupe Gobert	+ 0"
3	Tosh Van der Sande (BEL)	Lotto–Soudal	+ 1"
4	Benjamin Thomas (FRA)	Armée de Terre	+ 1"
5	Jonas van Genechten (BEL)	Cofidis	+ 9"
6	Vyacheslav Kuznetsov (RUS)	Team Katusha–Alpecin	+ 9"
7	Jim Aernouts (BEL)	Telenet–Fidea Lions	+ 14"
8	Michel Kreder (NED)	Aqua Blue Sport	+ 14"
9	Pim Ligthart (NED)	Roompot–Nederlandse Loterij	+ 14"
10	Jeroen Meijers (NED)	Roompot–Nederlandse Loterij	+ 14"

=== Stage 3 ===
24 July 2017 — Arlon to Houffalize, 181.4 km (112.7 mi)

Result of stage 3
Rank	Rider	Team	Time
1	Dylan Teuns (BEL)	BMC Racing Team	4h 25' 30"
2	Quentin Pacher (FRA)	Delko–Marseille Provence KTM	+ 9"
3	Odd Christian Eiking (NOR)	FDJ	+ 9"
4	Jelle Vanendert (BEL)	Lotto–Soudal	+ 14"
5	Juan José Lobato (ESP)	LottoNL–Jumbo	+ 18"
6	Pim Ligthart (NED)	Roompot–Nederlandse Loterij	+ 20"
7	Tosh Van der Sande (BEL)	Lotto–Soudal	+ 21"
8	Michel Kreder (NED)	Aqua Blue Sport	+ 24"
9	Thomas Sprengers (BEL)	Sport Vlaanderen–Baloise	+ 24"
10	Eliot Lietaer (BEL)	Sport Vlaanderen–Baloise	+ 24"

General classification after stage 3
Rank	Rider	Team	Time
1	Dylan Teuns (BEL)	BMC Racing Team	13h 23' 15"
2	Tosh Van der Sande (BEL)	Lotto–Soudal	+ 32"
3	Benjamin Thomas (FRA)	Armée de Terre	+ 39"
4	Jelle Vanendert (BEL)	Lotto–Soudal	+ 42"
5	Pim Ligthart (NED)	Roompot–Nederlandse Loterij	+ 44"
6	Michel Kreder (NED)	Aqua Blue Sport	+ 48"
7	Xandro Meurisse (BEL)	Wanty–Groupe Gobert	+ 50"
8	Maxime Vantomme (BEL)	WB Veranclassic Aqua Protect	+ 50"
9	Jeroen Meijers (NED)	Roompot–Nederlandse Loterij	+ 52"
10	Vyacheslav Kuznetsov (RUS)	Team Katusha–Alpecin	+ 54"

=== Stage 4 ===
25 July 2017 — Brussels (Brussels Capital Region) to Profondeville, 164.1 km (102.0 mi)

Result of stage 4
Rank	Rider	Team	Time
1	Jempy Drucker (LUX)	BMC Racing Team	3h 43' 26"
2	Adam Blythe (GBR)	Aqua Blue Sport	+ 0"
3	Jonas van Genechten (BEL)	Cofidis	+ 0"
4	Juan José Lobato (ESP)	LottoNL–Jumbo	+ 0"
5	Jasper De Buyst (BEL)	Lotto–Soudal	+ 0"
6	Coen Vermeltfoort (NED)	Roompot–Nederlandse Loterij	+ 0"
7	Bert Van Lerberghe (BEL)	Sport Vlaanderen–Baloise	+ 0"
8	Julien Duval (FRA)	AG2R La Mondiale	+ 0"
9	Hugo Hofstetter (FRA)	Cofidis	+ 0"
10	Justin Jules (FRA)	WB Veranclassic Aqua Protect	+ 0"

General classification after stage 4
Rank	Rider	Team	Time
1	Dylan Teuns (BEL)	BMC Racing Team	17h 06' 41"
2	Tosh Van der Sande (BEL)	Lotto–Soudal	+ 32"
3	Benjamin Thomas (FRA)	Armée de Terre	+ 39"
4	Jelle Vanendert (BEL)	Lotto–Soudal	+ 42"
5	Pim Ligthart (NED)	Roompot–Nederlandse Loterij	+ 44"
6	Michel Kreder (NED)	Aqua Blue Sport	+ 48"
7	Xandro Meurisse (BEL)	Wanty–Groupe Gobert	+ 50"
8	Maxime Vantomme (BEL)	WB Veranclassic Aqua Protect	+ 50"
9	Jeroen Meijers (NED)	Roompot–Nederlandse Loterij	+ 52"
10	Vyacheslav Kuznetsov (RUS)	Team Katusha–Alpecin	+ 54"

=== Stage 5 ===
26 July 2017 — Chièvres to Thuin, 185.1 km (115.0 mi)

Result of stage 5
Rank	Rider	Team	Time
1	Dylan Teuns (BEL)	BMC Racing Team	4h 13' 03"
2	Bryan Coquard (FRA)	Direct Énergie	+ 5"
3	Tosh Van der Sande (BEL)	Lotto–Soudal	+ 5"
4	Eliot Lietaer (BEL)	Sport Vlaanderen–Baloise	+ 5"
5	Benjamin Thomas (FRA)	Armée de Terre	+ 5"
6	Alex Kirsch (LUX)	WB Veranclassic Aqua Protect	+ 5"
7	Maxime Vantomme (BEL)	WB Veranclassic Aqua Protect	+ 5"
8	Loïc Vliegen (BEL)	BMC Racing Team	+ 5"
9	Michel Kreder (NED)	Aqua Blue Sport	+ 5"
10	Corné van Kessel (NED)	Telenet–Fidea Lions	+ 5"

Final general classification
Rank	Rider	Team	Time
1	Dylan Teuns (BEL)	BMC Racing Team	21h 19' 34"
2	Tosh Van der Sande (BEL)	Lotto–Soudal	+ 43"
3	Benjamin Thomas (FRA)	Armée de Terre	+ 54"
4	Jelle Vanendert (BEL)	Lotto–Soudal	+ 1' 02"
5	Michel Kreder (NED)	Aqua Blue Sport	+ 1' 03"
6	Maxime Vantomme (BEL)	WB Veranclassic Aqua Protect	+ 1' 05"
7	Xandro Meurisse (BEL)	Wanty–Groupe Gobert	+ 1' 10"
8	Eliot Lietaer (BEL)	Sport Vlaanderen–Baloise	+ 1' 12"
9	Loïc Vliegen (BEL)	BMC Racing Team	+ 1' 19"
10	Thomas Sprengers (BEL)	Sport Vlaanderen–Baloise	+ 1' 20"

== Classification leadership table ==
In the 2017 Tour de Wallonie, five different jerseys were awarded. The general classification was calculated by adding each cyclist's finishing times on each stage, and allowing time bonuses for the first three finishers at intermediate sprints (three seconds to first, two seconds to second and one second to third) and at the finish of all stages to the first three finishers: the stage winner won a ten-second bonus, with six and four seconds for the second and third riders respectively. The leader of the classification received a yellow jersey; it was considered the most important of the 2017 Tour de Wallonie, and the winner of the classification was considered the winner of the race.

Points for the mountains classification
Position	1	2	3	4	5
Points for Category 1	10	8	6	4	2
Points for Category 2	6	4	2	0	

There was also a mountains classification, the leadership of which was marked by a white jersey. In the mountains classification, points towards the classification were won by reaching the top of a climb before other cyclists. Each climb was categorised as either first, or second-category, with more points available for the higher-categorised climbs.

Points for the points classification
Position	1	2	3	4	5	6	7	8	9	10
Stage finishes	25	20	15	10	8	6	4	3	2	1

Additionally, there was a points classification, which awarded a green jersey. In the points classification, cyclists received points for finishing in the top 10 in a stage. For winning a stage, a rider earned 25 points, with 20 for second, 15 for third, 10 for fourth and so on, down to 1 point for 10th place. There was also a separate classification for the intermediate sprints, rewarding a purple jersey. Points towards the classification were accrued – awarded on a 5–3–1 scale – at intermediate sprint points during each stage; these intermediate sprints also offered bonus seconds towards the general classification as noted above.

The fifth and final jersey represented the classification for young riders, marked by a red jersey. This was decided the same way as the general classification, but only riders born after 22 July 1993 were eligible to be ranked in the classification. This jersey was only awarded post-stage, and was not worn during the race. There was also a team classification, in which the times of the best three cyclists per team on each stage were added together; the leading team at the end of the race was the team with the lowest total time.

Stage	Winner	General classification	Points classification	Mountains classification	Young rider classification	Sprints classification	Teams classification	Combativity award
1	Benjamin Thomas	Benjamin Thomas	Benjamin Thomas (Note: In stage two, Xandro Meurisse, who was second in the points classification, wore the green jersey, because Benjamin Thomas wore the yellow jersey as leader of the general classification.)	Alexis Gougeard	Benjamin Thomas	Kévin Ledanois	BMC Racing Team	Alexis Gougeard
2	Jasper De Buyst	Dylan Teuns	Benjamin Thomas	Jimmy Turgis	Benjamin Thomas	Tosh Van der Sande	BMC Racing Team	Alexis Gougeard
3	Dylan Teuns	Dylan Teuns	Dylan Teuns (Note: In stage four, Benjamin Thomas, who was second in the points classification, wore the green jersey, because Dylan Teuns wore the yellow jersey as leader of the general classification.) (Note: In stage five, Jempy Drucker, who was second in the points classification, wore the green jersey, because Dylan Teuns wore the yellow jersey as leader of the general classification.)	Alexis Gougeard	Benjamin Thomas	Evaldas Šiškevičius	WB Veranclassic Aqua Protect	Evaldas Šiškevičius
4	Jempy Drucker	Dylan Teuns	Dylan Teuns	Alexis Gougeard	Benjamin Thomas	Evaldas Šiškevičius	WB Veranclassic Aqua Protect	Kevin Van Melsen
5	Dylan Teuns	Dylan Teuns	Dylan Teuns	Alexis Gougeard	Benjamin Thomas	Evaldas Šiškevičius	WB Veranclassic Aqua Protect	Lasse Norman Hansen
Final		Dylan Teuns	Dylan Teuns	Alexis Gougeard	Benjamin Thomas	Evaldas Šiškevičius	WB Veranclassic Aqua Protect	No final award
