= Marchin =

Municipality in Liège Province, Wallonia, Belgium

Marchin Mårcin (Walloon)
- Municipality
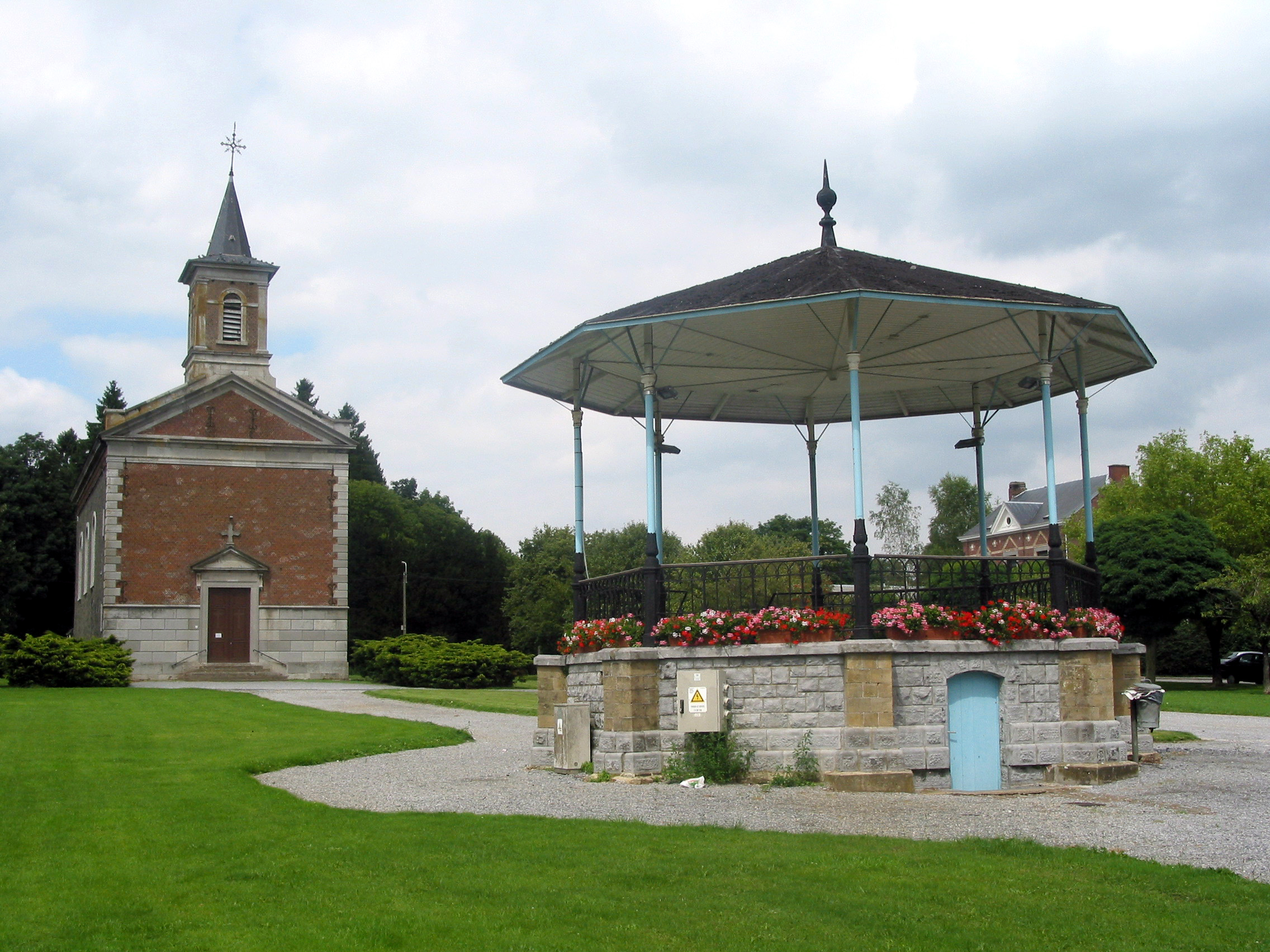

- Flag Coat of arms

- Location of Marchin in the province of Liège
- Interactive map of Marchin
- Location in Belgium
- Coordinates: 50°28′N 05°14′E
- Country: Belgium
- Community: French Community
- Region: Wallonia
- Province: Liège
- Arrondissement: Huy

Government
  - Mayor: Adrien Carlozzi (PS)
  - Governing party: PS

Area
  - Total: 30.16 km^{2} (11.64 sq mi)

Population (2018-01-01)
  - Total: 5,460
  - Density: 181/km^{2} (469/sq mi)
- Postal codes: 4570
- NIS code: 61039
- Area codes: 085
- Website: www.marchin.be

Marchin (French pronunciation: [maʁʃɛ̃]; Walloon: Mårcin) is a municipality of Wallonia located in the province of Liège, Belgium.

On January 1, 2006, Marchin had a total population of 5,114. The total area is 30.00 km^{2} which gives a population density of 170 inhabitants per km^{2}.

The municipality consists of the following districts: Marchin, and Vyle-et-Tharoul.

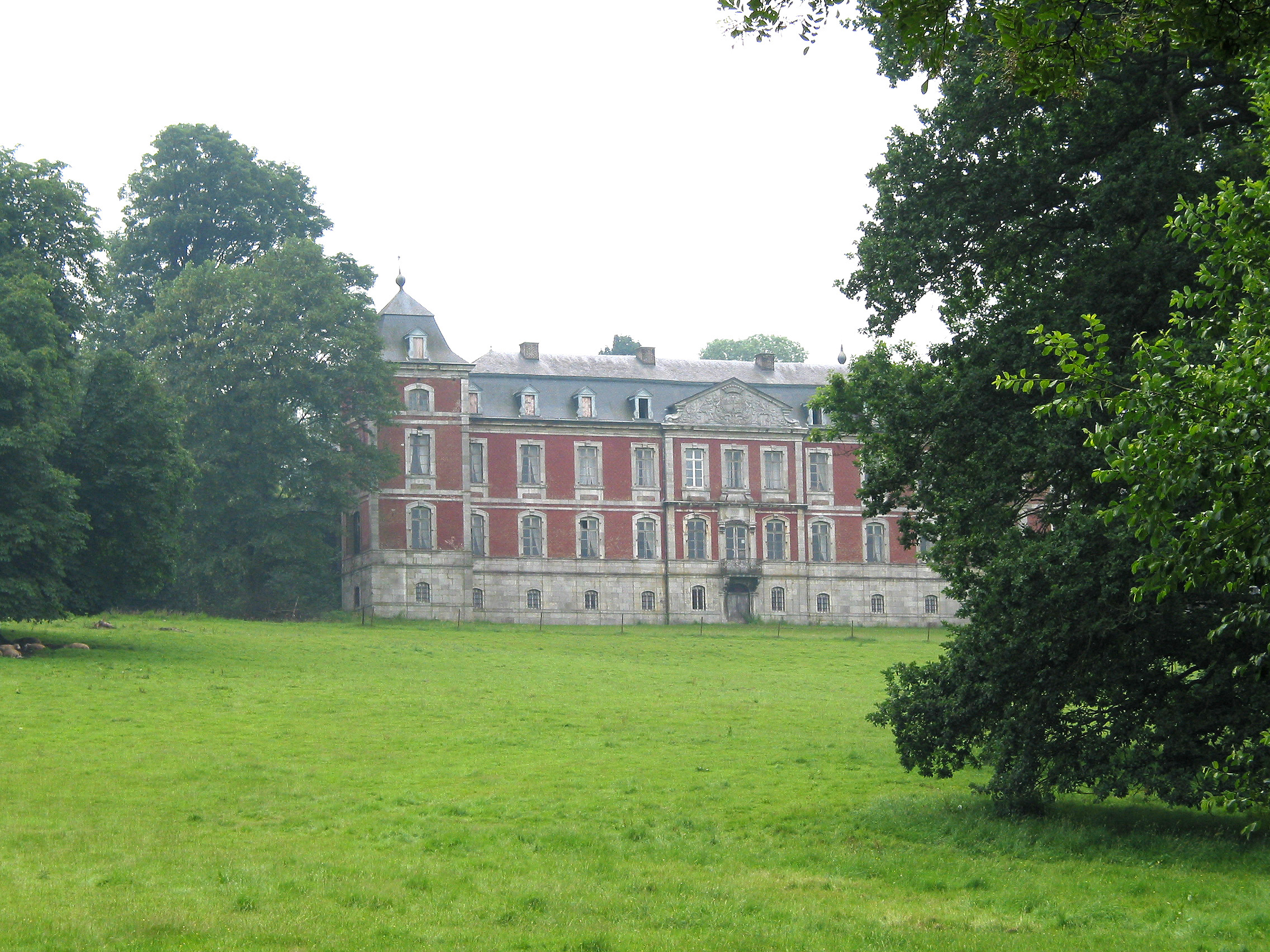
The Belle-Maison castle (18th century)

== See also ==
- List of protected heritage sites in Marchin
