= Nagawczyna =

- Village
- Location within Poland
- Coordinates: 50°3′N 21°27′E
- Country: Poland
- Voivodeship: Subcarpathian
- County: Dębica
- Gmina: Dębica
- Population (approx.): 3,000
- Website: www.nagawczyna.pl

Nagawczyna (Polish pronunciation: [naɡafˈt͡ʂɨna]) is a village in the administrative district of Gmina Dębica, within Dębica County, Subcarpathian Voivodeship, in south-eastern Poland.
