= Dylan Teuns =

Belgian cyclist (born 1992)

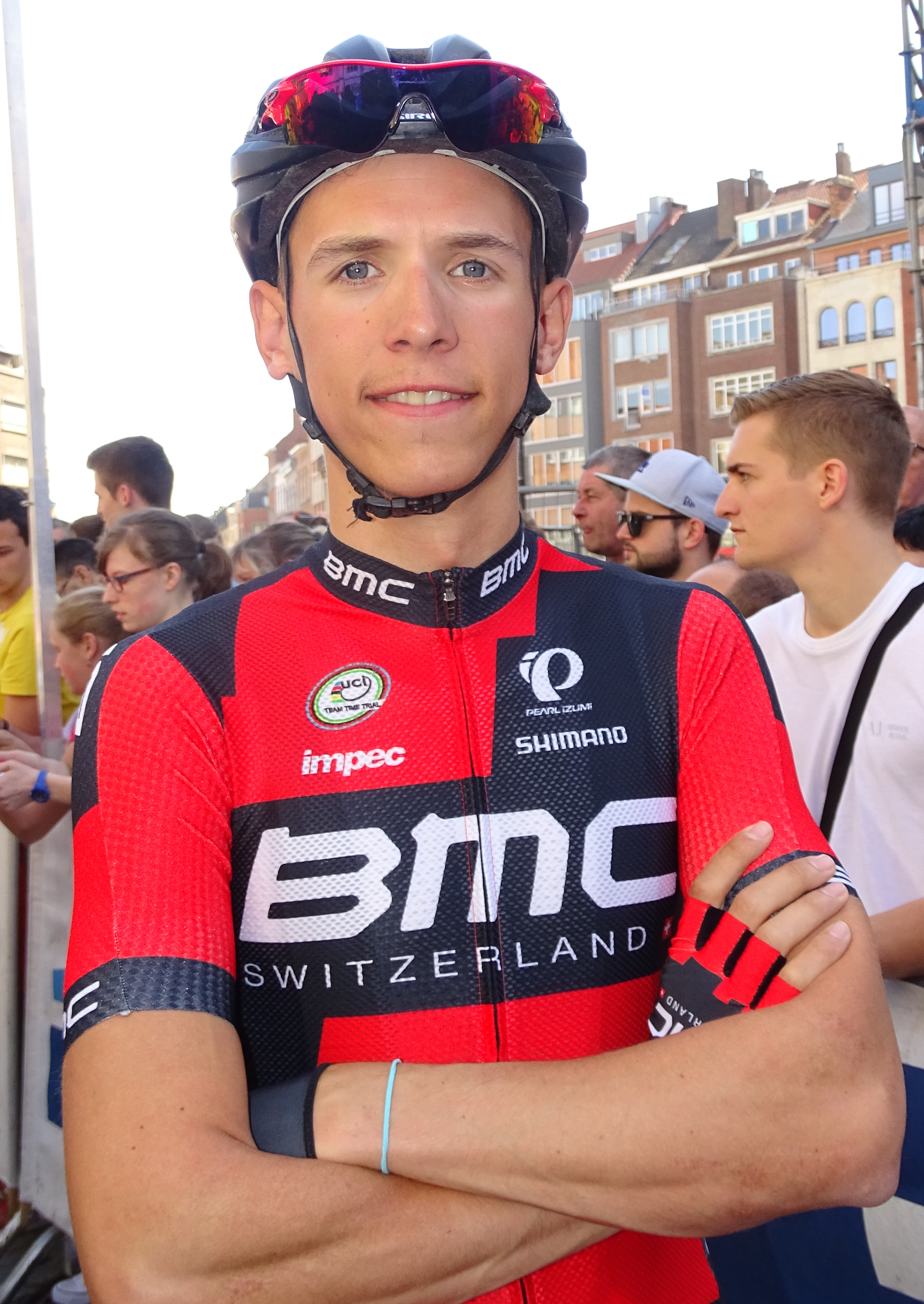
- Teuns in 2015

Personal information
- Full name: Dylan Teuns
- Born: 1 March 1992 (age 34) Diest, Flanders, Belgium
- Height: 1.81 m (5 ft 11 in)
- Weight: 64 kg (141 lb; 10.1 st)

Cycling career
- Sport: Cycling
- Current team: Retired
- Discipline: Road
- Role: Rider
- Rider type: Puncheur

Amateur teams
- 2011–2013: Jong Vlaanderen–Bauknecht
- 2014: BMC Development Team
- 2014: BMC Racing Team (stagiaire)

Professional teams
- 2015–2018: BMC Racing Team
- 2019–2022: Bahrain–Merida
- 2022–2024: Israel–Premier Tech
- 2025–2026: Cofidis

Major wins
- Grand Tours Tour de France 2 individual stages (2019, 2021) Stage races Tour de Pologne (2017) Tour de Wallonie (2017) Arctic Race of Norway (2017) One-day races and Classics La Flèche Wallonne (2022)

Dylan Teuns (born 1 March 1992) is a former Belgian professional road racing cyclist, who rode for BMC, Bahrain-Merida, Israel-Premier Tech and Cofidis. He was classified as a puncher and classics rider. During his career, Teuns collected 14 pro wins, including 2 Tour de France stages and La Flèche Wallonne

== Career ==
Born in Diest in Flemish Brabant, Teuns is based in Halen in Limburg.

=== BMC Racing Team (2015–18) ===
He originally joined BMC Racing Team as a stagiaire in 2014 before being announced as part of the team's line-up for the 2015 season. He was named in the start list for the 2016 Vuelta a España and the start list for the 2017 Giro d'Italia.

In July 2017, Teuns won the Tour de Wallonie, also winning two stages and the points classification alongside his overall success. Teuns then took overall victory in the Tour de Pologne. The following month, he won the Arctic Race of Norway, again winning two individual stages and the points classification.

=== Bahrain–Merida (2019–2022) ===
After four years with the BMC Racing Team, Teuns joined the Bahrain–Merida team for the 2019 season. In July 2019, he was named in the startlist for the 2019 Tour de France. Teuns won stage 6 of the race, outsprinting fellow breakaway rider Giulio Ciccone at the summit finish on La Planche des Belles Filles.

During the 2021 Tour de France, Teuns took his second Tour de France stage victory, winning the eighth stage of the race. On the final climb of the day, the Col de la Colombière, Teuns caught up with the solo leader Michael Woods and ultimately dropped him before the top of the ascent. Behind Teuns, Tadej Pogačar had attacked out of the peloton and was chasing down the riders in front of him. Pogačar closed to within 15 seconds of Teuns, but did not risk catching him on the descent on wet roads into Le Grand-Bornand.

After competing in the Volta a la Comunitat Valenciana and the Volta a Catalunya stage races in the first quarter of the 2022 season, Teuns' focus shifted to the Classics. After taking top-ten finishes at the Tour of Flanders (sixth), the Amstel Gold Race (tenth), and Brabantse Pijl (eighth), Teuns took his first one-day race victory at La Flèche Wallonne. Teuns made his move on the final ascent of the Mur de Huy, and managed to hold off five-time race winner Alejandro Valverde to become the first Belgian to win the race since Philippe Gilbert in 2011.

== Retirement ==
At the end of the 2026 season, Teuns was unable to find a new team. He wanted to keep racing at a World Tour (or World Tour worthy) team, but negotiations with Lotto-Intermarche broke down. This forced Teuns into retirement.

== Major results ==
2009
6th Tour of Flanders Juniores
2010
1st Omloop Het Nieuwsblad Juniores
2012
4th Overall Ronde de l'Isard
2013
1st Stage 1 Triptyque Ardennais
3rd Overall Ronde de l'Isard
5th Liège–Bastogne–Liège Espoirs
9th Memorial Van Coningsloo
2014
1st Stage 5 Tour de l'Avenir
1st Stage 3 Giro della Valle d'Aosta
1st Young rider classification, Tour of Utah
2nd Overall Tour de Bretagne

1st Young rider classification
1st Stage 3

2nd Liège–Bastogne–Liège Espoirs
2nd Omloop Het Nieuwsblad Beloften
2nd Piccolo Giro di Lombardia
6th Grand Prix de Wallonie
10th Overall Tour of Britain
2015
1st Stage 3 (TTT) Critérium du Dauphiné
3rd Volta Limburg Classic
4th Overall Tour of Belgium
2016
10th Volta Limburg Classic
2017 (8 pro wins)
1st Overall Arctic Race of Norway

1st Points classification
1st Young rider classification
1st Stages 1 & 4

1st Overall Tour de Wallonie

1st Points classification
1st Stages 3 & 5

1st Overall Tour de Pologne

1st Stage 3

3rd La Flèche Wallonne
6th Grand Prix de Wallonie
8th Grand Prix Pino Cerami
2018
3rd Giro di Lombardia
3rd Giro dell'Emilia
5th Overall Tour de Pologne
6th Overall Paris–Nice
7th Brabantse Pijl
2019 (2)
1st Stage 6 Tour de France
5th Overall Volta a la Comunitat Valenciana
5th Omloop Het Nieuwsblad
6th Overall Critérium du Dauphiné

1st Stage 2

9th Liège–Bastogne–Liège
10th Overall Vuelta a Andalucía
Vuelta a España

Held after Stage 6

2020 (1)
5th Overall Vuelta a Andalucía

1st Stage 5 (ITT)

5th Overall Volta a la Comunitat Valenciana
10th Gent–Wevelgem
2021 (1)
1st Stage 8 Tour de France
4th Overall Deutschland Tour
7th Brabantse Pijl
8th Overall Tour de Pologne
2022 (2)
1st La Flèche Wallonne
1st Stage 1 Tour de Romandie
4th Grand Prix de Wallonie
5th Overall Tour of Britain
6th Tour of Flanders
6th Liège–Bastogne–Liège
8th Brabantse Pijl
10th Amstel Gold Race
2023
2nd Grand Prix de Wallonie
5th Overall Arctic Race of Norway
9th Overall Tour de Suisse
10th Overall Deutschland Tour
2024
2nd Brabantse Pijl
8th Tour of Flanders
10th Overall Tour de Wallonie
2025
2nd Overall Étoile de Bessèges
6th Veneto Classic
2026
6th Overall Étoile de Bessèges
9th Grand Prix de Wallonie

=== General classification results timeline ===
Grand Tour general classification results
Grand Tour	2015	2016	2017	2018	2019	2020	2021	2022	2023	2024	2025
Giro d'Italia	—	—	75	—	—	—	—	—	—	—	—
Tour de France	—	—	—	—	44	—	17	19	35	—	90
Vuelta a España	100	—	33	12	—	—	—	—	—	74	—
Major stage race general classification results
Race	2015	2016	2017	2018	2019	2020	2021	2022	2023	2024	2025
Paris–Nice	—	—	96	6	17	DNF	20	—	—	—	—
Tirreno–Adriatico	—	—	—	—	—	49	—	—	—	—	—
Volta a Catalunya	52	—	—	—	—	NH	—	12	32	DNF	—
Tour of the Basque Country	—	—	DNF	11	24	NH	—	—	—	—	—
Tour de Romandie	—	—	—	—	—	NH	—	30	—	—	—
Critérium du Dauphiné	64	—	—	54	6	91	25	DNF	—	21	90
Tour de Suisse	—	DNF	—	—	—	NH	—	—	9	—	—

=== Classics results timeline ===
Monument	2015	2016	2017	2018	2019	2020	2021	2022	2023	2024	2025	2026
Milan–San Remo	—	—	—	—	DNF	70	—	—	—	—	—	—
Tour of Flanders	—	—	—	—	—	11	35	6	37	8	41	60
Paris–Roubaix	—	—	—	—	—	NH	—	DNF	—	—	—	51
Liège–Bastogne–Liège	31	17	24	20	9	27	34	6	—	15	88	
Giro di Lombardia	70	—	—	3	DNF	—	37	—	DNF	26	DNF	
Classic	2015	2016	2017	2018	2019	2020	2021	2022	2023	2024	2025	2026
Omloop Het Nieuwsblad	38	—	—	—	5	18	40	—	—	22	45	20
Strade Bianche	—	—	—	—	—	DNF	—	—	—	23	37	—
Gent–Wevelgem	—	—	90	—	—	10	—	—	—	—	—	97
Brabantse Pijl	40	28	33	7	66	12	7	8	—	2	30	
Amstel Gold Race	64	18	44	25	64	NH	33	10	—	15	46	
La Flèche Wallonne	13	30	3	30	14	75	32	1	—	DNF	DNF	
Giro dell'Emilia	—	DNF	DNF	3	61	—	—	DNF	62	19	51	

Legend
—	Did not compete
DNF	Did not finish
IP	In progress
NH	Not held
