= Matysówka =

Part of the city of Rzeszów, Poland

- Osiedle
- Location within Poland
- Coordinates: 49°58′59″N 22°03′00″E
- Country: Poland
- Voivodeship: Subcarpathian
- County: Rzeszów
- Gmina: Rzeszów
- Population: 1,157

Matysówka [matɨˈsufka] is a former village in south-eastern Poland. It had a population of 1,157 before being abolished on 1 January 2019 and incorporated into the neighbouring city of Rzeszów as its 31st osiedle. Administratively, it used to be under the jurisdiction of Gmina Tyczyn, within Rzeszów County, Subcarpathian Voivodeship.
