= Floris Gerts =

Dutch cyclist

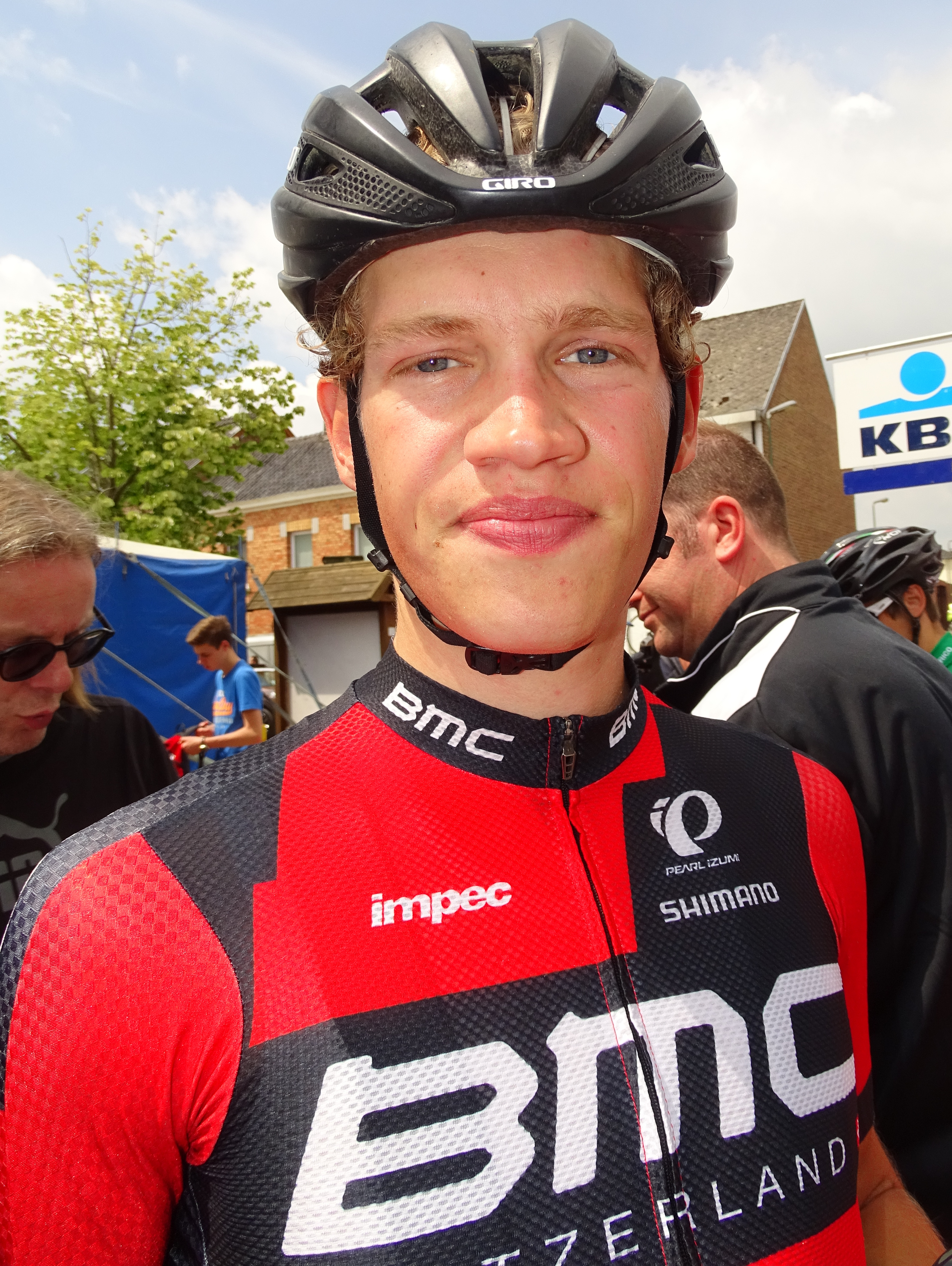
- Gerts in 2015

Personal information
- Full name: Floris Gerts
- Born: 3 May 1992 (age 34) Maastricht, Netherlands
- Height: 1.82 m (6 ft 0 in)
- Weight: 71 kg (157 lb; 11.2 st)

Cycling career
- Sport: Cycling
- Discipline: Road
- Role: Rider

Amateur teams
- 2012: RTVG Swift
- 2013: Croford
- 2015: BMC Development Team
- 2020: Mooi Jong–HSK Trias

Professional teams
- 2014: Rabobank Development Team
- 2015: BMC Racing Team (stagiaire)
- 2016–2017: BMC Racing Team
- 2018: Roompot–Nederlandse Loterij
- 2019: Tarteletto–Isorex

Floris Gerts (born 3 May 1992 in Maastricht) is a Dutch cyclist, who most recently rode for Dutch amateur team Mooi Jong–HSK Trias.

== Major results ==
2013
1st Grand Prix de la Magne
1st Stage 2 Tour de Franche-Comté
8th Ronde van Midden-Nederland
2014
1st Kermesse de Zele
6th Antwerpse Havenpijl
9th Gooikse Pijl
2015
1st Dorpenomloop Rucphen
1st Omloop Het Nieuwsblad U23
1st Stage 2 Triptyque Ardennais
2nd Internationale Wielertrofee Jong Maar Moedig
3rd Grand Prix Impanis-Van Petegem
4th Japan Cup
8th Flèche Ardennaise
9th Overall Tour de Normandie

1st Stage 6

2016
1st Volta Limburg Classic
7th London–Surrey Classic
2017
10th Tacx Pro Classic
2018
4th Grote Prijs Stad Zottegem
4th Druivenkoers Overijse
7th Ronde van Drenthe
2019
5th Paris–Troyes
