= Manuel Senni =

Italian bicycle racer

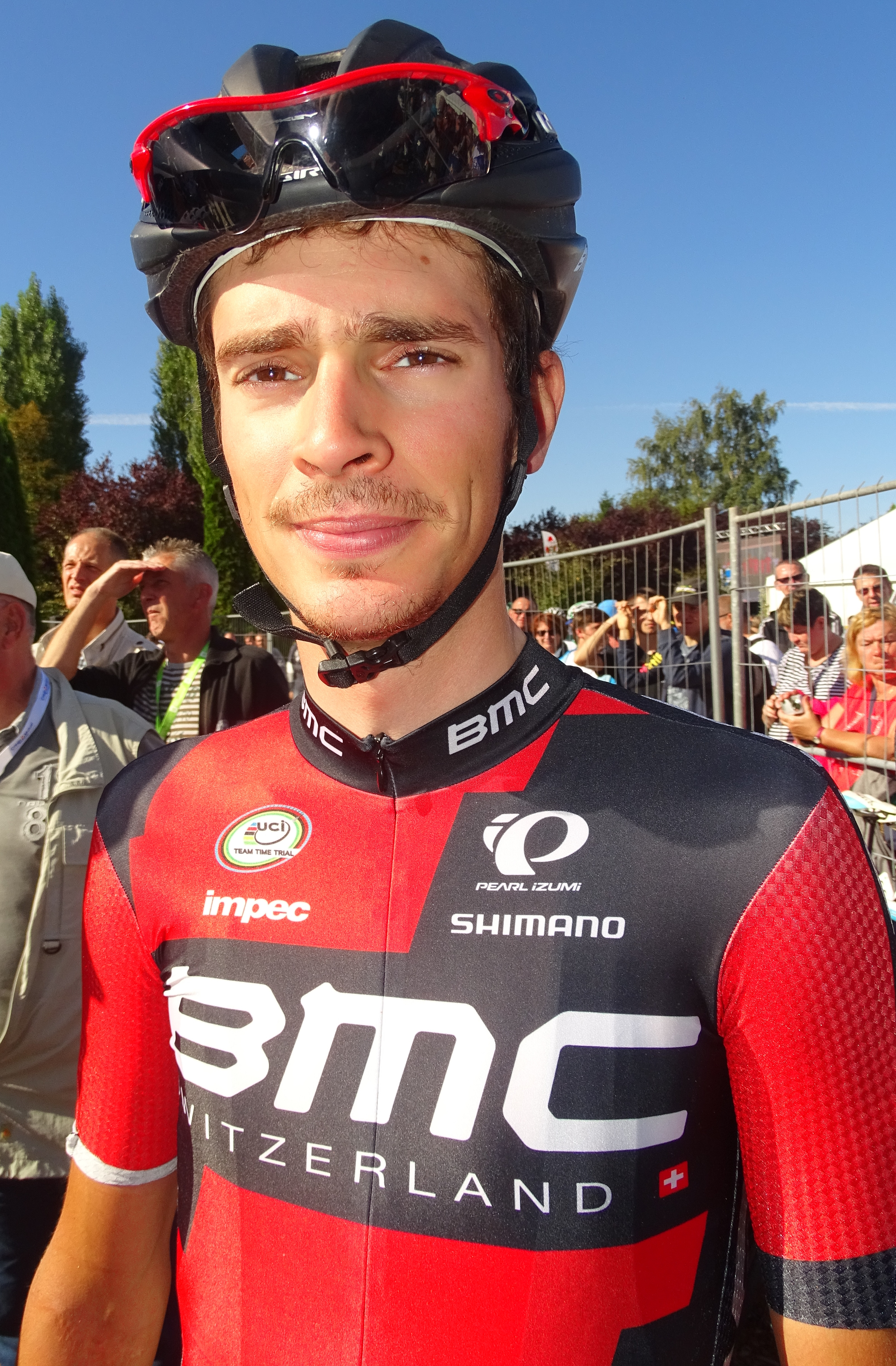
- Senni in 2015.

Personal information
- Full name: Manuel Senni
- Born: 11 March 1992 (age 34) Cesena, Italy
- Height: 1.81 m (5 ft 11 in)
- Weight: 60 kg (130 lb; 9.4 st)

Cycling career
- Sport: Cycling
- Current team: Retired
- Discipline: Road
- Role: Rider
- Rider type: Climber

Amateur team
- 2011–2014: Team Colpack

Professional teams
- 2015–2017: BMC Racing Team
- 2018–2020: Bardiani–CSF
- 2021: Amore & Vita

Major wins
- Stage races Colorado Classic (2017)

Manuel Senni (born 11 March 1992) is an Italian former cyclist, who competed as a professional from 2015 to 2021. He competed in four editions of the Giro d'Italia, having entered the race each year between 2016 and 2019.

== Major results ==
2009
10th Overall Giro di Basilicata
2010
3rd Overall Giro di Basilicata

1st Stage 3

10th Overall Giro della Lunigiana
2012
4th Gran Premio San Giuseppe
4th Trofeo Banca Popolare di Vicenza
9th Gran Premio Palio del Recioto
9th Trofeo Città di San Vendemiano
10th Giro del Medio Brenta
2013
5th Trofeo Banca Popolare di Vicenza
10th GP Capodarco
2014
3rd Overall Giro della Valle d'Aosta

1st Points classification
1st Stages 1 & 2

4th Trofeo Banca Popolare di Vicenza
4th Gran Premio Palio del Recioto
2017
1st Overall Colorado Classic
3rd Overall Volta a la Comunitat Valenciana

1st Young rider classification
1st Stage 1 (TTT)

3rd Giro dell'Appennino
2018
1st Mountains classification Tour Poitou-Charentes en Nouvelle-Aquitaine
9th Overall International Tour of Rhodes

=== Grand Tour general classification results timeline ===
Grand Tour	2016	2017	2018	2019
Giro d'Italia	76	79	DNF	59
Tour de France	—	—	—	—
Vuelta a España	—	—	—	—

Legend
—	Did not compete
DNF	Did not finish
