= 2020 Astana season =

Astana Pro Team
- 2020 season
- UCI code: AST
- Status: UCI WorldTeam
- Chairman: Alexander Vinokourov
- Main sponsor(s): Samruk-Kazyna
- Based: Kazakhstan
- Bicycles: Wilier Triestina
- Groupset: Shimano

Season victories
- One-day races: 5
- Stage race overall: 1
- Stage race stages: 7
- National Championships: 1
- Most wins: Jakob Fuglsang; Aleksandr Vlasov (5 each)
- Jersey

The 2020 season for the Astana cycling team began in January at the Tour Down Under.

== Team roster ==
As of 1 January 2020.

Rider	Date of birth
Alex Aranburu (ESP)	19 September 1995 (aged 24)
Zhandos Bizhigitov (KAZ)	10 June 1991 (aged 28)
Manuele Boaro (ITA)	12 March 1987 (aged 32)
Hernando Bohórquez (COL)	22 June 1992 (aged 27)
Rodrigo Contreras (COL)	2 June 1994 (aged 25)
Laurens De Vreese (BEL)	29 September 1988 (aged 31)
Fabio Felline (ITA)	29 March 1990 (aged 29)
Daniil Fominykh (KAZ)	28 August 1991 (aged 28)
Omar Fraile (ESP)	17 July 1990 (aged 29)
Jakob Fuglsang (DEN)	22 March 1985 (aged 34)
Yevgeniy Gidich (KAZ)	19 May 1996 (aged 23)
Jonas Gregaard (DEN)	30 July 1996 (aged 23)
Dmitriy Gruzdev (KAZ)	13 March 1986 (aged 33)
Hugo Houle (CAN)	27 September 1990 (aged 29)

Rider	Date of birth
Ion Izagirre (ESP)	4 February 1989 (aged 30)
Gorka Izagirre (ESP)	7 October 1987 (aged 32)
Merhawi Kudus (ERI)	23 January 1994 (aged 25)
Miguel Ángel López (COL)	4 February 1994 (aged 25)
Alexey Lutsenko (KAZ)	7 September 1992 (aged 27)
Davide Martinelli (ITA)	31 May 1993 (aged 26)
Yuriy Natarov (KAZ)	28 December 1996 (aged 23)
Vadim Pronskiy (KAZ)	4 June 1998 (aged 21)
Óscar Rodríguez (ESP)	6 May 1995 (aged 24)
Luis León Sánchez (ESP)	24 November 1983 (aged 36)
Nikita Stalnov (KAZ)	14 September 1991 (aged 28)
Harold Tejada (COL)	27 April 1997 (aged 22)
Aleksandr Vlasov (RUS)	23 April 1996 (aged 23)
Artyom Zakharov (KAZ)	27 October 1991 (aged 28)

Riders who joined the team for the 2020 season

Rider	2019 team
Fabio Felline	Trek–Segafredo
Alex Aranburu	Caja Rural–Seguros RGA
Davide Martinelli	Deceuninck–Quick-Step
Aleksandr Vlasov	Gazprom–RusVelo
Óscar Rodríguez	Fundación Euskadi
Vadim Pronskiy	Vino–Astana Motors
Harold Tejada	Medellín

Riders who left the team during or after the 2019 season

Rider	2020 team
Dario Cataldo	Movistar Team
Magnus Cort	EF Pro Cycling
Pello Bilbao	Bahrain–McLaren
Davide Villella	Movistar Team
Andrey Zeits	Mitchelton–Scott
Jan Hirt	CCC Team
Davide Ballerini	Deceuninck–Quick-Step

== Season victories ==
Date	Race	Competition	Rider	Country	Location
14 February	Tour de la Provence, Stage 2	UCI Europe Tour; UCI ProSeries	Aleksandr Vlasov (RUS)	France	La Ciotat
15 February	Vuelta a Murcia, Stage 2	UCI Europe Tour	Luis León Sánchez (ESP)	Spain	Murcia
15 February	Vuelta a Murcia, Mountains classification	UCI Europe Tour	Omar Fraile (ESP)	Spain	
15 February	Vuelta a Murcia, Teams classification	UCI Europe Tour	(Note: The riders in the squad were Zhandos Bizhigitov, Daniil Fominykh, Omar Fraile, Yevgeniy Gidich, Óscar Rodríguez, Luis León Sánchez and Nikita Stalnov.)	Spain	
16 February	Tour de la Provence, Points classification	UCI Europe Tour; UCI ProSeries	Alexey Lutsenko (KAZ)	France	
16 February	Tour de la Provence, Young rider classification	UCI Europe Tour; UCI ProSeries	Aleksandr Vlasov (RUS)	France	
16 February	Tour de la Provence, Teams classification	UCI Europe Tour; UCI ProSeries	(Note: The riders in the squad were Alex Aranburu, Fabio Felline, Gorka Izagirre, Merhawi Kudus, Alexey Lutsenko, Vadim Pronskiy and Aleksandr Vlasov.)	France	
19 February	Vuelta a Andalucía, Stage 1	UCI Europe Tour; UCI ProSeries	Jakob Fuglsang (DEN)	Spain	Grazalema
21 February	Vuelta a Andalucía, Stage 3	UCI Europe Tour; UCI ProSeries	Jakob Fuglsang (DEN)	Spain	Úbeda
22 February	Volta ao Algarve, Stage 4	UCI Europe Tour; UCI ProSeries	Miguel Ángel López (COL)	Portugal	Alto do Malhão
23 February	Vuelta a Andalucía, Overall	UCI Europe Tour; UCI ProSeries	Jakob Fuglsang (DEN)	Spain	
23 February	Vuelta a Andalucía, Points classification	UCI Europe Tour; UCI ProSeries	Jakob Fuglsang (DEN)	Spain	
3 August	Gran Trittico Lombardo	UCI Europe Tour; UCI ProSeries	Gorka Izagirre (ESP)	Italy	Varese
6 August	Mont Ventoux Dénivelé Challenge	UCI Europe Tour	Aleksandr Vlasov (RUS)	France	Mont Ventoux
15 August	Il Lombardia	UCI World Tour	Jakob Fuglsang (DEN)	Italy	Como
18 August	Giro dell'Emilia	UCI Europe Tour; UCI ProSeries	Aleksandr Vlasov (RUS)	Italy	Bologna
30 August	Memorial Marco Pantani	UCI Europe Tour	Fabio Felline (ITA)	Italy	Cesenatico
3 September	Tour de France, Stage 6	UCI World Tour	Alexey Lutsenko (KAZ)	France	Mont Aigoual
4 September	Settimana Internazionale di Coppi e Bartali, Teams classification	UCI Europe Tour	(Note: The riders in the squad were Rodrigo Contreras, Fabio Felline, Jonas Gregaard, Merhawi Kudus, Vadim Pronskiy, and Nikita Stalnov.)	Italy	
14 September	Tirreno–Adriatico, Young rider classification	UCI World Tour	Aleksandr Vlasov (RUS)	Italy	
25 October	Vuelta a España, Stage 6	UCI World Tour	Ion Izagirre (ESP)	Spain	Aramón Formigal

== National, Continental and World champions 2020 ==
Date	Discipline	Jersey	Rider	Country	Location
23 August	Spanish National Road Race Champion		Luis León Sánchez (ESP)	Spain	Baeza
