= Albert Timmer =

Road bicycle racer

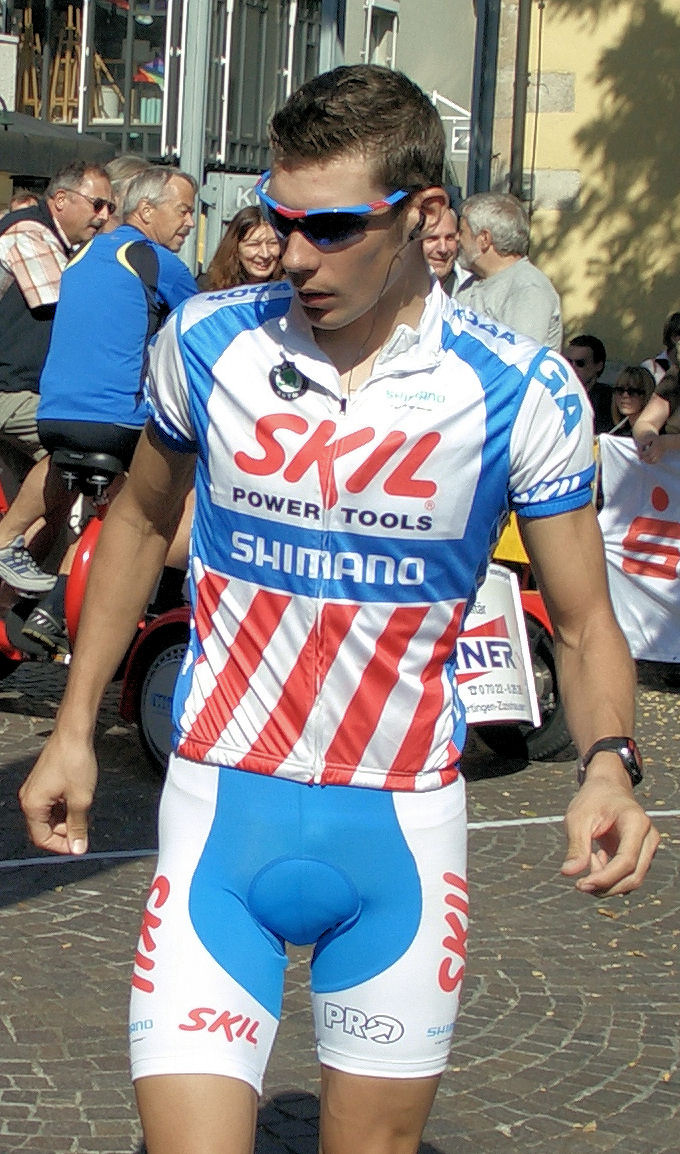
- Timmer at the 2007 3-Länder-Tour.

Personal information
- Full name: Albert Timmer
- Nickname: Albi
- Born: 13 June 1985 (age 41) Gramsbergen, Netherlands
- Height: 1.86 m (6 ft 1 in)
- Weight: 76 kg (168 lb; 12.0 st)

Cycling career
- Sport: Cycling
- Current team: Team Picnic–PostNL (women)
- Discipline: Road
- Role: Rider (retired); Coach; Directeur sportif
- Rider type: All-rounder

Amateur team
- 2004–2006: Team Löwik Meubelen–Tegeltoko

Professional team
- 2007–2017: Skil–Shimano

Managerial teams
- 2019–2020: Development Team Sunweb
- 2021–: Team DSM (women)

Albert Timmer (born 13 June 1985) is a Dutch former road bicycle racer, who competed professionally between 2007 and 2017, exclusively for Team Sunweb and its previous squad iterations. During his career, Timmer competed in – and finished all – eleven Grand Tours between 2009 and 2017, but did not win any professional races as an individual.

Since retiring as a rider, he has worked as a coach and directeur sportif for Development Team Sunweb, and the Team Picnic–PostNL women's squad.

== Major results ==
2006
9th Overall Flèche du Sud
2007
6th Overall Tour of Qinghai Lake
2008
1st Stage 1b (TTT) Brixia Tour
2010
8th Hel van het Mergelland
2012
1st Mountains classification, Tour de Luxembourg
2013
6th Münsterland Giro
2014
4th Grand Prix Impanis-Van Petegem
7th Overall Ster ZLM Toer

=== Grand Tour general classification results timeline ===
Grand Tour	2009	2010	2011	2012	2013	2014	2015	2016	2017
Giro d'Italia	—	—	—	—	129	87	—	121	—
Tour de France	130	—	—	148	164	146	139	153	157
Vuelta a España	—	—	164	—	—	—	—	—	—

Legend
—	Did not compete
DNF	Did not finish
