= 2019 Liège–Bastogne–Liège =

Cycling race

2019 UCI World Tour, race 20 of 38

Race details
- Dates: 28 April 2019
- Stages: 1
- Distance: 256 km (159 mi)
- Winning time: 6h 37' 37"

Results
	Winner	Jakob Fuglsang (DEN)	(Astana)
	Second	Davide Formolo (ITA)	(Bora–Hansgrohe)
	Third	Maximilian Schachmann (GER)	(Bora–Hansgrohe)

The 2019 Liège–Bastogne–Liège was a road cycling one-day race that took place on 28 April 2019 in Belgium. It was the 105th edition of Liège–Bastogne–Liège and the 20th event of the 2019 UCI World Tour. It was won by Jakob Fuglsang.

== Teams ==
As Liège–Bastogne–Liège was a UCI World Tour event, all eighteen UCI WorldTeams were invited automatically and obliged to enter a team in the race. Seven UCI Professional Continental teams competed, completing the 25-team peloton.

UCI WorldTeams

- AG2R La Mondiale
- Astana
- Bahrain–Merida
- Bora–Hansgrohe
- CCC Team
- Deceuninck–Quick-Step
- EF Education First
- Groupama–FDJ
- Lotto–Soudal
- Mitchelton–Scott
- Movistar Team
- Team Dimension Data
- Team Jumbo–Visma
- Team Katusha–Alpecin
- Team Sunweb
- Trek–Segafredo
- UAE Team Emirates
- Team Sky

UCI Professional Continental teams

- Arkéa–B&B Hotels
- Cofidis
- Team TotalEnergies
- Team Flanders–Baloise
- B&B Hotels p/b KTM
- Wagner Bazin WB
- Intermarché–Wanty

== Result ==
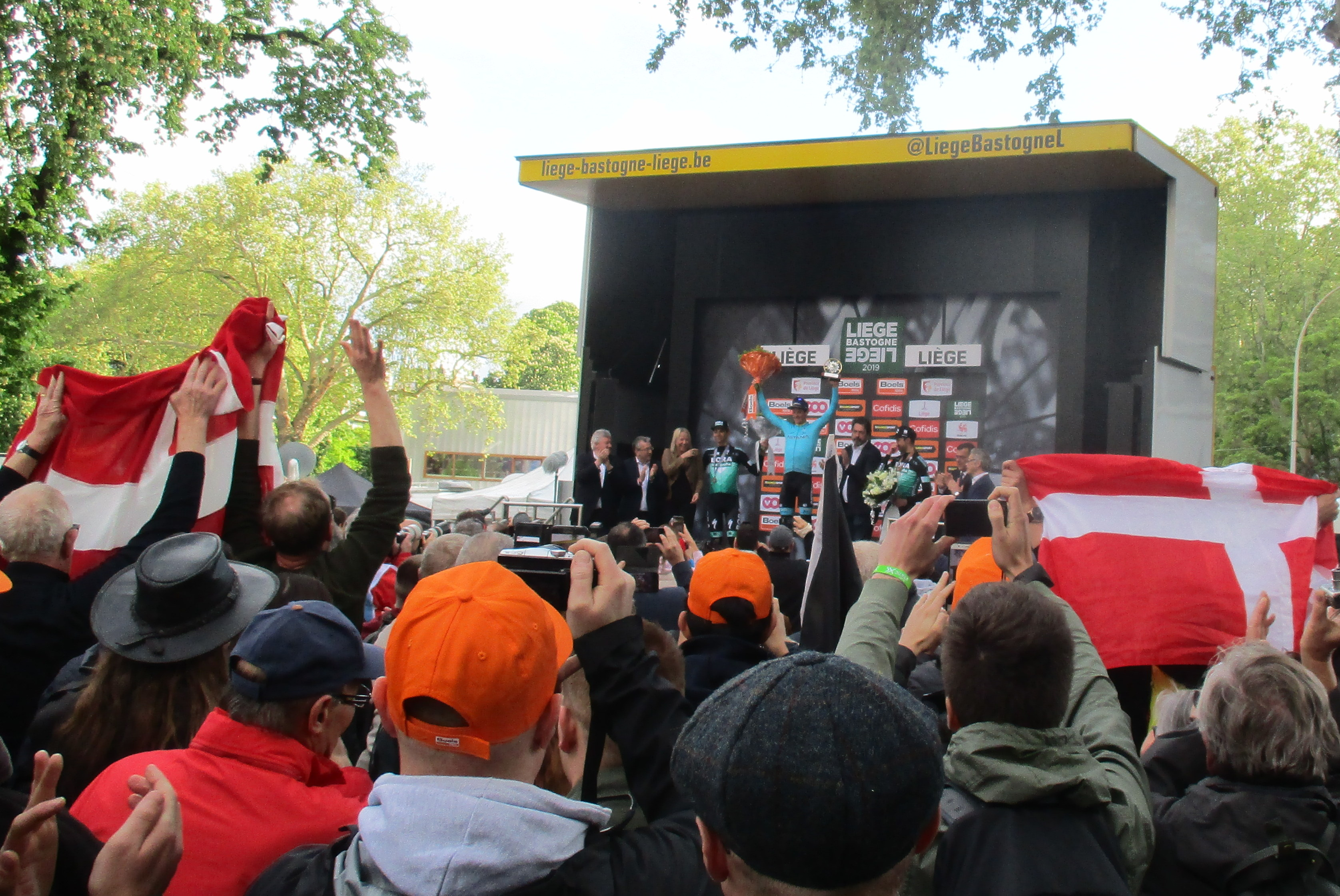
Podium: 1. Jakob Fuglsang; 2. Davide Formolo; 3. Maximilian Schachmann

Result
Rank	Rider	Team	Time
1	Jakob Fuglsang (DEN)	Astana	6h 37' 37"
2	Davide Formolo (ITA)	Bora–Hansgrohe	+27"
3	Maximilian Schachmann (GER)	Bora–Hansgrohe	+ 57"
4	Adam Yates (GBR)	Mitchelton–Scott	+ 57"
5	Michael Woods (CAN)	EF Education First	+ 57"
6	David Gaudu (FRA)	Groupama–FDJ	+ 57"
7	Mikel Landa (ESP)	Movistar Team	+ 57"
8	Vincenzo Nibali (ITA)	Bahrain–Merida	+ 1’ 00"
9	Dylan Teuns (BEL)	Bahrain–Merida	+ 1’ 05"
10	Wout Poels (NED)	Team Sky	+ 1’ 26"
