= 2019 Vuelta a Murcia =

2019 UCI Europe Tour

Race details
- Dates: 15–16 February 2019
- Stages: 2
- Distance: 366.1 km (227.5 mi)
- Winning time: 8h 29' 38"

Results
Jersey awarded to the overall winner	Winner	Luis León Sánchez (ESP)	(Astana)
	Second	Alejandro Valverde (ESP)	(Movistar Team)
	Third	Pello Bilbao (ESP)	(Astana)
Jersey awarded to the points classification winner	Points	Luis León Sánchez (ESP)	(Astana)
Jersey awarded to the mountains classification winner	Mountains	Jakob Fuglsang (DEN)	(Astana)
	Team	Astana	

The 2019 Vuelta a Murcia was the 39th edition of the Vuelta a Murcia cycle race. It was from 15 to 16 February 2018 as a UCI Europe Tour category 2.1 race. The race was won by Luis León Sánchez of the Astana team.

== Teams ==
Eighteen teams of up to seven riders started the race:

UCI WorldTeams

- Astana
- Mitchelton–Scott
- Team Katusha–Alpecin
- Movistar Team
- CCC Team
- Bora–Hansgrohe

UCI Professional Continental teams

- Roompot–Charles
- Sport Vlaanderen–Baloise
- Rally UHC Cycling
- Euskadi–Murias
- Burgos BH
- Cofidis
- Caja Rural–Seguros RGA
- Gazprom–RusVelo
- Wanty–Gobert
- Direct Énergie

UCI Continental team

- Kometa Cycling Team
- Fundación Euskadi

== Route ==
Stage characteristics and winners
Stage	Date	Course	Distance	Type	Stage winner
1	15 February	Yecla to San Javier	188.8 km (117.3 mi)	Hilly stage	Pello Bilbao (ESP)
2	16 February	Beniel to Murcia	177.3 km (110.2 mi)	Medium mountain stage	Luis León Sánchez (ESP)

== Stages ==
=== Stage 1 ===
Stage 1 result and general classification after Stage 1

Rank	Rider	Team	Time
1	Pello Bilbao (ESP)	Astana	4h 15' 02"
2	Omar Fraile (ESP)	Astana	+ 3"
3	Luis León Sánchez (ESP)	Astana	s.t.
4	Alejandro Valverde (ESP)	Movistar Team	s.t.
5	Patrick Konrad (AUT)	Bora–Hansgrohe	s.t.
6	Jakob Fuglsang (DEN)	Astana	s.t.
7	Matteo Trentin (ITA)	Mitchelton–Scott	+ 9"
8	Jempy Drucker (LUX)	Bora–Hansgrohe	s.t.
9	Marco Haller (AUT)	Team Katusha–Alpecin	s.t.
10	Thomas Boudat (FRA)	Direct Énergie	s.t.

=== Stage 2 ===
Stage 2 result

Rank	Rider	Team	Time
1	Luis León Sánchez (ESP)	Astana	4h 14' 33"
2	Alejandro Valverde (ESP)	Movistar Team	s.t.
3	Matteo Trentin (ITA)	Mitchelton–Scott	+ 13"
4	Patrick Konrad (AUT)	Bora–Hansgrohe	s.t.
5	Pello Bilbao (ESP)	Astana	s.t.
6	Óscar Rodríguez (ESP)	Euskadi–Murias	s.t.
7	José Herrada (ESP)	Cofidis	s.t.
8	Jakob Fuglsang (DEN)	Astana	+ 16"
9	Omar Fraile (ESP)	Astana	s.t.
10	Sergey Chernetskiy (RUS)	Caja Rural–Seguros RGA	+ 1' 29"

== Final classification standings ==
Final general classification

Rank	Rider	Team	Time
1	Luis León Sánchez (ESP)	Astana	8h 29' 38"
2	Alejandro Valverde (ESP)	Movistar Team	s.t.
3	Pello Bilbao (ESP)	Astana	+ 10"
4	Patrick Konrad (AUT)	Bora–Hansgrohe	+ 13"
5	Omar Fraile (ESP)	Astana	+ 16"
6	Jakob Fuglsang (DEN)	Astana	s.t.
7	Matteo Trentin (ITA)	Mitchelton–Scott	+ 19"
8	José Herrada (ESP)	Cofidis	s.t.
9	Óscar Rodríguez (ESP)	Euskadi–Murias	s.t.
10	Sergey Chernetskiy (RUS)	Caja Rural–Seguros RGA	+ 1' 35"

Final mountains classification

Rank	Rider	Team	Points
1	Jakob Fuglsang (DEN)	Astana	12
2	Rubén Fernández (ESP)	Movistar Team	10
3	Alejandro Valverde (ESP)	Movistar Team	8
4	Riccardo Zoidl (AUT)	CCC Team	8
5	Damien Howson (AUS)	Mitchelton–Scott	6
6	Luis León Sánchez (ESP)	Astana	5
7	Ángel Madrazo (ESP)	Burgos BH	3
8	Pello Bilbao (ESP)	Astana	2
9	Omar Fraile (ESP)	Astana	2
10	Robin Carpenter (USA)	Rally UHC Cycling	2

Final team classification

Rank	Team	Time
1	Astana	25h 29' 20"
2	Team Katusha–Alpecin	+ 4' 36"
3	Mitchelton–Scott	+ 4' 58"
4	Movistar Team	+ 5' 22"
5	CCC Team	+ 5' 56"
6	Caja Rural–Seguros RGA	+ 9' 54"
7	Sport Vlaanderen–Baloise	+ 11' 53"
8	Euskadi–Murias	+ 12' 22"
9	Roompot–Charles	+ 16' 29"
10	Bora–Hansgrohe	+ 16' 33"
