= 2020 Vuelta a Andalucía =

2020 UCI Europe Tour 2020 UCI ProSeries

Race details
- Dates: 19–23 February 2020
- Stages: 5
- Distance: 686.8 km (426.8 mi)
- Winning time: 17h 47' 58"

Results
Jersey awarded to the overall winner	Winner	Jakob Fuglsang (DEN)	(Astana)
	Second	Jack Haig (AUS)	(Mitchelton–Scott)
	Third	Mikel Landa (ESP)	(Bahrain–McLaren)
Jersey awarded to the points classification winner	Points	Jakob Fuglsang (DEN)	(Astana)
Jersey awarded to the mountains classification winner	Mountains	Floris De Tier (BEL)	(Alpecin–Fenix)
	Team	Bahrain–McLaren	

The 2020 Vuelta a Andalucía was a road cycling stage race that took place in the Andalucía region of Spain between 19 and 23 February 2020. It was the 66th edition of the Vuelta a Andalucía and is rated as a 2.Pro event as part of the 2020 UCI Europe Tour and the 2020 UCI ProSeries.

== Teams ==
Twenty-one teams were invited to the race. Of these teams, eight are UCI WorldTour teams, twelve are UCI Professional Continental teams, and one is a UCI Continental teams. Each team entered seven riders, except for AG2R La Mondiale with six and Bingoal–Wallonie Bruxelles with five. Of the starting peloton of 144 riders, 127 finished.

UCI WorldTeams

- AG2R La Mondiale
- Astana
- Bahrain–McLaren
- Lotto–Soudal
- Mitchelton–Scott
- Movistar Team
- Team Jumbo–Visma
- UAE Team Emirates

UCI Professional Continental Teams

- Alpecin–Fenix
- Arkéa–Samsic
- Bingoal–Wallonie Bruxelles
- Burgos BH
- B&B Hotels–Vital Concept
- Caja Rural–Seguros RGA
- Circus–Wanty Gobert
- Fundación–Orbea
- Gazprom–RusVelo
- Riwal Readynez
- Sport Vlaanderen–Baloise
- Total Direct Énergie

UCI Continental Teams

- Equipo Kern Pharma

== Route ==
Stage characteristics and winners
Stage	Date	Course	Distance	Type	Stage winner
1	19 February	Alhaurín de la Torre to Grazalema	173.8 km (108.0 mi)	Mountain stage	Jakob Fuglsang (DEN)
2	20 February	Sevilla to Iznájar	198.1 km (123.1 mi)	Hilly stage	Gonzalo Serrano (ESP)
3	21 February	Jaen to Úbeda	176.9 km (109.9 mi)	Mountain stage	Jakob Fuglsang (DEN)
4	22 February	Villanueva Mesía to Granada	125 km (78 mi)	Mountain stage	Jack Haig (AUS)
5	23 February	Mijas to Mijas	13 km (8.1 mi)	Individual time trial	Dylan Teuns (BEL)
Total		686.8 km (426.8 mi)			

== Stages ==
=== Stage 1 ===
19 February 2020 – Alhaurín de la Torre to Grazalema, 173.8 km (108.0 mi)

Stage 1 Result
Rank	Rider	Team	Time
1	Jakob Fuglsang (DEN)	Astana	4h 41' 08"
2	Mikel Landa (ESP)	Bahrain–McLaren	+ 6"
3	Dylan Teuns (BEL)	Bahrain–McLaren	+ 25"
4	Jack Haig (AUS)	Mitchelton–Scott	+ 27"
5	Pello Bilbao (ESP)	Bahrain–McLaren	+ 27"
6	Ion Izagirre (ESP)	Astana	+ 30"
7	Chris Harper (AUS)	Team Jumbo–Visma	+ 54"
8	David de la Cruz (ESP)	UAE Team Emirates	+ 1' 03"
9	Harm Vanhoucke (BEL)	Lotto–Soudal	+ 1' 03"
10	Rubén Fernández (ESP)	Fundación–Orbea	+ 1' 07"

General classification after Stage 1
Rank	Rider	Team	Time
1	Jakob Fuglsang (DEN)	Astana	4h 41' 08"
2	Mikel Landa (ESP)	Bahrain–McLaren	+ 6"
3	Dylan Teuns (BEL)	Bahrain–McLaren	+ 25"
4	Jack Haig (AUS)	Mitchelton–Scott	+ 27"
5	Pello Bilbao (ESP)	Bahrain–McLaren	+ 27"
6	Ion Izagirre (ESP)	Astana	+ 30"
7	Chris Harper (AUS)	Team Jumbo–Visma	+ 54"
8	David de la Cruz (ESP)	UAE Team Emirates	+ 1' 03"
9	Harm Vanhoucke (BEL)	Lotto–Soudal	+ 1' 03"
10	Rubén Fernández (ESP)	Fundación–Orbea	+ 1' 07"

=== Stage 2 ===
20 February 2020 – Sevilla to Iznájar, 198.1 km (123.1 mi)

Stage 2 Result
Rank	Rider	Team	Time
1	Gonzalo Serrano (ESP)	Caja Rural–Seguros RGA	5h 07' 49"
2	Juan José Lobato (ESP)	Fundación–Orbea	+ 2"
3	Dylan Teuns (BEL)	Bahrain–McLaren	+ 2"
4	Clément Venturini (FRA)	AG2R La Mondiale	+ 4"
5	Jack Haig (AUS)	Mitchelton–Scott	+ 4"
6	Jakob Fuglsang (DEN)	Astana	+ 4"
7	Edward Planckaert (BEL)	Sport Vlaanderen–Baloise	+ 4"
8	Ion Izagirre (ESP)	Astana	+ 4"
9	Andrea Pasqualon (ITA)	Circus–Wanty Gobert	+ 4"
10	Marc Soler (ESP)	Movistar Team	+ 4"

General classification after Stage 2
Rank	Rider	Team	Time
1	Jakob Fuglsang (DEN)	Astana	9h 49' 01"
2	Mikel Landa (ESP)	Bahrain–McLaren	+ 6"
3	Dylan Teuns (BEL)	Bahrain–McLaren	+ 23"
4	Jack Haig (AUS)	Mitchelton–Scott	+ 27"
5	Ion Izagirre (ESP)	Astana	+ 30"
6	Pello Bilbao (ESP)	Bahrain–McLaren	+ 30"
7	Chris Harper (AUS)	Team Jumbo–Visma	+ 57"
8	Harm Vanhoucke (BEL)	Lotto–Soudal	+ 1' 06"
9	Rubén Fernández (ESP)	Fundación–Orbea	+ 1' 10"
10	David de la Cruz (ESP)	UAE Team Emirates	+ 1' 14"

=== Stage 3 ===
21 February 2020 – Jaen to Úbeda, 176.9 km (109.9 mi)

Stage 3 Result
Rank	Rider	Team	Time
1	Jakob Fuglsang (DEN)	Astana	4h 33' 25"
2	Pello Bilbao (ESP)	Bahrain–McLaren	+ 0"
3	Brandon McNulty (USA)	UAE Team Emirates	+ 1"
4	Ion Izagirre (ESP)	Astana	+ 4"
5	Marc Soler (ESP)	Movistar Team	+ 6"
6	Dylan Teuns (BEL)	Bahrain–McLaren	+ 8"
7	Jack Haig (AUS)	Mitchelton–Scott	+ 8"
8	Mikel Landa (ESP)	Bahrain–McLaren	+ 8"
9	Antwan Tolhoek (NED)	Team Jumbo–Visma	+ 13"
10	Maurits Lammertink (NED)	Circus–Wanty Gobert	+ 26"

General classification after Stage 3
Rank	Rider	Team	Time
1	Jakob Fuglsang (DEN)	Astana	14h 22' 26"
2	Mikel Landa (ESP)	Bahrain–McLaren	+ 14"
3	Pello Bilbao (ESP)	Bahrain–McLaren	+ 30"
4	Dylan Teuns (BEL)	Bahrain–McLaren	+ 31"
5	Ion Izagirre (ESP)	Astana	+ 34"
6	Jack Haig (AUS)	Mitchelton–Scott	+ 35"
7	Chris Harper (AUS)	Team Jumbo–Visma	+ 1' 23"
8	Marc Soler (ESP)	Movistar Team	+ 1' 27"
9	Rubén Fernández (ESP)	Fundación–Orbea	+ 1' 36"
10	Harm Vanhoucke (BEL)	Lotto–Soudal	+ 1' 36"

=== Stage 4 ===
22 February 2020 – Villanueva Mesía to Granada, 125 km (78 mi)

Stage 4 Result
Rank	Rider	Team	Time
1	Jack Haig (AUS)	Mitchelton–Scott	3h 07' 35"
2	Jakob Fuglsang (DEN)	Astana	+ 0"
3	Mikel Landa (ESP)	Bahrain–McLaren	+ 0"
4	Brandon McNulty (USA)	UAE Team Emirates	+ 27"
5	Ion Izagirre (ESP)	Astana	+ 27"
6	Dylan Teuns (BEL)	Bahrain–McLaren	+ 1' 14"
7	Marc Soler (ESP)	Movistar Team	+ 1' 14"
8	Álvaro Cuadros (ESP)	Caja Rural–Seguros RGA	+ 1' 14"
9	Harm Vanhoucke (BEL)	Lotto–Soudal	+ 1' 14"
10	Andrey Zeits (KAZ)	Mitchelton–Scott	+ 1' 14"

General classification after Stage 4
Rank	Rider	Team	Time
1	Jakob Fuglsang (DEN)	Astana	17h 30' 01"
2	Mikel Landa (ESP)	Bahrain–McLaren	+ 14"
3	Jack Haig (AUS)	Mitchelton–Scott	+ 35"
4	Ion Izagirre (ESP)	Astana	+ 1' 01"
5	Pello Bilbao (ESP)	Bahrain–McLaren	+ 1' 44"
6	Dylan Teuns (BEL)	Bahrain–McLaren	+ 1' 45"
7	Marc Soler (ESP)	Movistar Team	+ 2' 41"
8	Rubén Fernández (ESP)	Fundación–Orbea	+ 2' 50"
9	Harm Vanhoucke (BEL)	Lotto–Soudal	+ 2' 50"
10	Brandon McNulty (USA)	UAE Team Emirates	+ 2' 59"

=== Stage 5 ===
23 February 2020 – Mijas to Mijas, 13 km (8.1 mi) (ITT)

Stage 5 Result
Rank	Rider	Team	Time
1	Dylan Teuns (BEL)	Bahrain–McLaren	17' 57"
2	Jakob Fuglsang (DEN)	Astana	+ 0"
3	Alex Edmondson (AUS)	Mitchelton–Scott	+ 2"
4	Pello Bilbao (ESP)	Bahrain–McLaren	+ 3"
5	Brandon McNulty (USA)	UAE Team Emirates	+ 9"
6	Ion Izagirre (ESP)	Astana	+ 17"
7	Jack Haig (AUS)	Mitchelton–Scott	+ 24"
8	Chris Harper (AUS)	Team Jumbo–Visma	+ 31"
9	Nelson Oliveira (POR)	Movistar Team	+ 32"
10	Sonny Colbrelli (ITA)	Bahrain–McLaren	+ 33"

General classification after Stage 5
Rank	Rider	Team	Time
1	Jakob Fuglsang (DEN)	Astana	17h 47' 58"
2	Jack Haig (AUS)	Mitchelton–Scott	+ 59"
3	Mikel Landa (ESP)	Bahrain–McLaren	+ 1' 12"
4	Ion Izagirre (ESP)	Astana	+ 1' 18"
5	Dylan Teuns (BEL)	Bahrain–McLaren	+ 1' 45"
6	Pello Bilbao (ESP)	Bahrain–McLaren	+ 1' 47"
7	Brandon McNulty (USA)	UAE Team Emirates	+ 3' 08"
8	Marc Soler (ESP)	Movistar Team	+ 3' 21"
9	Rubén Fernández (ESP)	Fundación–Orbea	+ 3' 33"
10	Harm Vanhoucke (BEL)	Lotto–Soudal	+ 4' 12"

== Classification leadership table ==
Classification leadership by stage
Stage	Winner	General classification	Points classification	Mountains classification	Teams classification
1	Jakob Fuglsang	Jakob Fuglsang	Jakob Fuglsang	Jakob Fuglsang	Bahrain–McLaren
2	Gonzalo Serrano	Jakob Fuglsang	Jakob Fuglsang	Jakob Fuglsang	Bahrain–McLaren
3	Jakob Fuglsang	Jakob Fuglsang	Jakob Fuglsang	Floris De Tier	Bahrain–McLaren
4	Jack Haig	Jakob Fuglsang	Jakob Fuglsang	Floris De Tier	Bahrain–McLaren
5	Dylan Teuns	Jakob Fuglsang	Jakob Fuglsang	Floris De Tier	Bahrain–McLaren
Final		Jakob Fuglsang	Jakob Fuglsang	Floris De Tier	Bahrain–McLaren

== Classification standings ==
=== General classification ===
Final general classification (1–10)
Rank	Rider	Team	Time
1	Jakob Fuglsang (DEN)	Astana	17h 47' 58"
2	Jack Haig (AUS)	Mitchelton–Scott	+ 59"
3	Mikel Landa (ESP)	Bahrain–McLaren	+ 1' 12"
4	Ion Izagirre (ESP)	Astana	+ 1' 18"
5	Dylan Teuns (BEL)	Bahrain–McLaren	+ 1' 45"
6	Pello Bilbao (ESP)	Bahrain–McLaren	+ 1' 47"
7	Brandon McNulty (USA)	UAE Team Emirates	+ 3' 08"
8	Marc Soler (ESP)	Movistar Team	+ 3' 21"
9	Rubén Fernández (ESP)	Fundación–Orbea	+ 3' 33"
10	Harm Vanhoucke (BEL)	Lotto–Soudal	+ 4' 12"

=== Points classification ===
Final points classification (1–10)
Rank	Rider	Team	Points
1	Jakob Fuglsang (DEN)	Astana	100
2	Dylan Teuns (BEL)	Bahrain–McLaren	77
3	Jack Haig (AUS)	Mitchelton–Scott	69
4	Ion Izagirre (ESP)	Astana	54
5	Pello Bilbao (ESP)	Bahrain–McLaren	54
6	Mikel Landa (ESP)	Bahrain–McLaren	48
7	Brandon McNulty (USA)	UAE Team Emirates	42
8	Marc Soler (ESP)	Movistar Team	34
9	Gonzalo Serrano (ESP)	Caja Rural–Seguros RGA	25
10	Juan José Lobato (ESP)	Fundación–Orbea	20

=== Mountains classification ===
Final mountains classification (1–10)
Rank	Rider	Team	Points
1	Floris De Tier (BEL)	Arkéa–Samsic	32
2	Mikel Bizkarra (ESP)	Fundación–Orbea	20
3	Jakob Fuglsang (DEN)	Astana	16
4	Jack Haig (AUS)	Mitchelton–Scott	16
5	Mikel Landa (ESP)	Bahrain–McLaren	16
6	Loïc Vliegen (BEL)	Circus–Wanty Gobert	10
7	Carmelo Urbano (ESP)	Caja Rural–Seguros RGA	9
8	Enric Mas (ESP)	Movistar Team	9
9	Lennard Hofstede (NED)	Team Jumbo–Visma	8
10	Jérôme Cousin (FRA)	Total Direct Énergie	6

=== Teams classification ===
Teams classification after stage 4 (1–10)
Rank	Team	Time
1	Bahrain–McLaren	52h 03' 46"
2	Mitchelton–Scott	+ 3' 54"
3	Astana	+ 11' 38"
4	Fundación–Orbea	+ 13' 55"
5	Movistar Team	+ 14' 15"
6	UAE Team Emirates	+ 23' 21"
7	Lotto–Soudal	+ 25' 58"
8	Team Jumbo–Visma	+ 28' 11"
9	Equipo Kern Pharma	+ 31' 49"
10	Caja Rural–Seguros RGA	+ 35' 04"
