= 2012 Tour de Luxembourg =

2012 UCI Europe Tour

Race details
- Dates: 30 May – 3 June 2012
- Stages: 4 + Prologue
- Distance: 726.5 km (451.4 mi)
- Winning time: 17h 08' 40"

Results
| Jersey awarded to the overall winner | Winner | Jakob Fuglsang (DEN) | (RadioShack–Nissan) |
| | Second | Wout Poels (NED) | (Vacansoleil–DCM) |
| | Third | Fränk Schleck (LUX) | (RadioShack–Nissan) |
| Jersey awarded to the points classification winner | Points | André Greipel (GER) | (Lotto–Belisol) |
| Jersey awarded to the mountains classification winner | Mountains | Albert Timmer (NED) | (Argos–Shimano) |
| Jersey awarded to the youth classification winner | Youth | Wout Poels (NED) | (Vacansoleil–DCM) |
| | Team | (Luxembourg) RadioShack–Nissan | |

The 2012 Tour de Luxembourg cycling race was the 72nd running of the Tour de Luxembourg. It was part of the 2012 UCI Europe Tour and classed as a 2.HC event. It was won by Jakob Fuglsang from Denmark, a member of the Luxembourg-based team, RadioShack–Nissan.

== Schedule ==
| Stage | Route | Distance | Type | Date | Winner |
|---|---|---|---|---|---|
| P | Luxembourg | 2.7 km (1.7 mi) | Individual time trial | 30 May | Jimmy Engoulvent (FRA) |
| 1 | Luxembourg to Hesperange | 181 km (112.5 mi) | Flat stage | 31 May | André Greipel (GER) |
| 2 | Schifflange to Leudelange | 183.9 km (114.3 mi) | Flat stage | 1 June | André Greipel (GER) |
| 3 | Eschweiler to Differdange | 205.4 km (127.6 mi) | Intermediate stage | 3 June | Wout Poels (NED) |
| 4 | Mersch to Luxembourg | 153.5 km (95.4 mi) | Flat stage | 4 June | Jürgen Roelandts (BEL) |

== Teams ==
- Accent.jobs–Willems Veranda's
- Ag2r–La Mondiale
- Andalucía
- Cofidis
- Landbouwkrediet–Euphony
- Lotto–Belisol
- RadioShack–Nissan
- Saur–Sojasun
- Team Sky
- SpiderTech–C10
- Argos–Shimano
- Differdange–Magic–SportFood.de
- Team Europcar
- Team Luxembourg
- Topsport Vlaanderen–Mercator
- Vacansoleil–DCM

== Stages ==
Key:
: Leader and eventual winner of General Classification, based on total time.
: Leader and eventual winner of points classification, based on points given for finishing position on each mass start stage.
: Leader and eventual winner of climbers' classification, based on points gained on passing hilltops.
: Leader and eventual winner of young riders' classification, based on total time, but restricted to riders under 25 at beginning of year.

=== Prologue ===
30 May 2012 – Luxembourg, 2.7 km (1.7 mi) individual time trial (ITT)

Prologue Result and General Classification after Prologue

| | Rider | Team | Time |
|---|---|---|---|
| 1 | Jimmy Engoulvent (FRA) | Saur–Sojasun | 3' 43" |
| 2 | Grégory Rast (SUI) | RadioShack–Nissan | + 3" |
| 3 | Jonathan Hivert (FRA) | Saur–Sojasun | + 3" |
| 4 | Mathew Hayman (AUS) | Team Sky | + 5" |
| 5 | Jakob Fuglsang (DEN) | RadioShack–Nissan | + 7" |
| 6 | Marcel Sieberg (GER) | Lotto–Belisol | + 7" |
| 7 | Tom Dumoulin (NED) | Argos–Shimano | + 7" |
| 8 | Jimmy Casper (FRA) | Ag2r–La Mondiale | + 7" |
| 9 | Damien Gaudin (FRA) | Team Europcar | + 7" |
| 10 | Aleksejs Saramotins (LAT) | Cofidis | + 8" |

=== Stage 1 ===
31 May 2012 – Luxembourg to Hesperange, 181 km (112 mi)

Stage 1 Result

| | Rider | Team | Time |
|---|---|---|---|
| 1 | André Greipel (GER) | Lotto–Belisol | 4h 53' 56" |
| 2 | Davide Appollonio (ITA) | Team Sky | s.t. |
| 3 | Samuel Dumoulin (FRA) | Cofidis | s.t. |
| 4 | Romain Feillu (FRA) | Vacansoleil–DCM | s.t. |
| 5 | Koen de Kort (NED) | Argos–Shimano | s.t. |
| 6 | Sascha Weber (GER) | Differdange–Magic–SportFood.de | s.t. |
| 7 | Roy Curvers (NED) | Argos–Shimano | s.t. |
| 8 | Vincent Baestaens (BEL) | Landbouwkrediet–Euphony | s.t. |
| 9 | Ben Swift (GBR) | Team Sky | s.t. |
| 10 | Yohann Gène (FRA) | Team Europcar | s.t. |

General Classification after Stage 1

| | Rider | Team | Time |
|---|---|---|---|
| 1 | Jimmy Engoulvent (FRA) | Saur–Sojasun | 4h 57' 39" |
| 2 | Grégory Rast (SUI) | RadioShack–Nissan | + 3" |
| 3 | Jonathan Hivert (FRA) | Saur–Sojasun | + 3" |
| 4 | Mathew Hayman (AUS) | Team Sky | + 5" |
| 5 | Jakob Fuglsang (DEN) | RadioShack–Nissan | + 7" |
| 6 | Marcel Sieberg (GER) | Lotto–Belisol | + 7" |
| 7 | Tom Dumoulin (NED) | Argos–Shimano | + 7" |
| 8 | Jimmy Casper (FRA) | Ag2r–La Mondiale | + 7" |
| 9 | Damien Gaudin (FRA) | Team Europcar | + 7" |
| 10 | Aleksejs Saramotins (LAT) | Cofidis | + 8" |

=== Stage 2 ===
1 June 2012 – Schifflange to Leudelange, 183.9 km (114.3 mi)

Stage 2 Result

| | Rider | Team | Time |
|---|---|---|---|
| 1 | André Greipel (GER) | Lotto–Belisol | 4h 29' 20" |
| 2 | Ben Swift (GBR) | Team Sky | s.t. |
| 3 | Jürgen Roelandts (BEL) | Lotto–Belisol | s.t. |
| 4 | Romain Feillu (FRA) | Vacansoleil–DCM | s.t. |
| 5 | Jempy Drucker (LUX) | Accent.jobs–Willems Veranda's | s.t. |
| 6 | Michael Van Staeyen (BEL) | Topsport Vlaanderen–Mercator | s.t. |
| 7 | Samuel Dumoulin (FRA) | Cofidis | s.t. |
| 8 | Roy Curvers (NED) | Argos–Shimano | s.t. |
| 9 | Maxime Monfort (BEL) | RadioShack–Nissan | s.t. |
| 10 | Wout Poels (NED) | Vacansoleil–DCM | s.t. |

General Classification after Stage 2

| | Rider | Team | Time |
|---|---|---|---|
| 1 | Jimmy Engoulvent (FRA) | Saur–Sojasun | 9h 26' 59" |
| 2 | Grégory Rast (SUI) | RadioShack–Nissan | + 3" |
| 3 | Jonathan Hivert (FRA) | Saur–Sojasun | + 3" |
| 4 | Mathew Hayman (AUS) | Team Sky | + 5" |
| 5 | Jakob Fuglsang (DEN) | RadioShack–Nissan | + 7" |
| 6 | Marcel Sieberg (GER) | Lotto–Belisol | + 7" |
| 7 | Tom Dumoulin (NED) | Argos–Shimano | + 7" |
| 8 | Jimmy Casper (FRA) | Ag2r–La Mondiale | + 7" |
| 9 | Damien Gaudin (FRA) | Team Europcar | + 7" |
| 10 | Aleksejs Saramotins (LAT) | Cofidis | + 8" |

=== Stage 3 ===
2 June 2012 – Eschweiler to Differdange, 205.4 km (127.6 mi)

Stage 3 Result

| | Rider | Team | Time |
|---|---|---|---|
| 1 | Wout Poels (NED) | Vacansoleil–DCM | 5h 01' 11" |
| 2 | Jakob Fuglsang (DEN) | RadioShack–Nissan | s.t. |
| 3 | Fränk Schleck (LUX) | RadioShack–Nissan | s.t. |
| 4 | Michael Barry (CAN) | Team Sky | + 24" |
| 5 | Salvatore Puccio (ITA) | Team Sky | + 24" |
| 6 | Vincent Jérôme (FRA) | Team Europcar | + 24" |
| 7 | Ben Gastauer (LUX) | Ag2r–La Mondiale | + 24" |
| 8 | Thomas Damuseau (FRA) | Argos–Shimano | + 24" |
| 9 | Samuel Dumoulin (FRA) | Cofidis | + 24" |
| 10 | Johnny Hoogerland (NED) | Vacansoleil–DCM | + 24" |

General Classification after Stage 3

| | Rider | Team | Time |
|---|---|---|---|
| 1 | Jakob Fuglsang (DEN) | RadioShack–Nissan | 14h 28' 17" |
| 2 | Wout Poels (NED) | Vacansoleil–DCM | + 2" |
| 3 | Fränk Schleck (LUX) | RadioShack–Nissan | + 5" |
| 4 | Jonathan Hivert (FRA) | Saur–Sojasun | + 20" |
| 5 | Tom Dumoulin (NED) | Argos–Shimano | + 24" |
| 6 | Samuel Dumoulin (FRA) | Cofidis | + 25" |
| 7 | Sébastien Delfosse (BEL) | Landbouwkrediet–Euphony | + 28" |
| 8 | Maxime Monfort (BEL) | RadioShack–Nissan | + 29" |
| 9 | Bob Jungels (LUX) | Team Luxembourg | + 29" |
| 10 | Martin Elmiger (SUI) | Ag2r–La Mondiale | + 32" |

=== Stage 4 ===
3 June 2012 – Mersch to Luxembourg, 153.5 km (95.4 mi)

Stage results were taken from the first passage through the finish line for safety reasons due to poor weather conditions.

Stage 4 Result

| | Rider | Team | Time |
|---|---|---|---|
| 1 | Jürgen Roelandts (BEL) | Lotto–Belisol | 2h 39' 58" |
| 2 | Laurens De Vreese (BEL) | Topsport Vlaanderen–Mercator | + 25" |
| 3 | Jakob Fuglsang (DEN) | RadioShack–Nissan | + 25" |
| 4 | Maxime Monfort (BEL) | RadioShack–Nissan | + 25" |
| 5 | Wout Poels (NED) | Vacansoleil–DCM | + 25" |
| 6 | Fränk Schleck (LUX) | RadioShack–Nissan | + 25" |
| 7 | Martin Elmiger (SUI) | Ag2r–La Mondiale | + 25" |
| 8 | Eliot Lietaer (BEL) | Topsport Vlaanderen–Mercator | + 25" |
| 9 | Tom Dumoulin (NED) | Argos–Shimano | + 25" |
| 10 | Jonathan Hivert (FRA) | Saur–Sojasun | + 25" |

Final General Classification

| | Rider | Team | Time |
|---|---|---|---|
| 1 | Jakob Fuglsang (DEN) | RadioShack–Nissan | 17h 08' 40" |
| 2 | Wout Poels (NED) | Vacansoleil–DCM | + 2" |
| 3 | Fränk Schleck (LUX) | RadioShack–Nissan | + 5" |
| 4 | Jonathan Hivert (FRA) | Saur–Sojasun | + 20" |
| 5 | Tom Dumoulin (NED) | Argos–Shimano | + 24" |
| 6 | Samuel Dumoulin (FRA) | Cofidis | + 25" |
| 7 | Sébastien Delfosse (BEL) | Landbouwkrediet–Euphony | + 28" |
| 8 | Maxime Monfort (BEL) | RadioShack–Nissan | + 29" |
| 9 | Bob Jungels (LUX) | Team Luxembourg | + 29" |
| 10 | Martin Elmiger (SUI) | Ag2r–La Mondiale | + 32" |

== Classification leadership ==
| Stage | Winner | General classification | Points classification | Mountains classification | Young rider classification | Team classification |
|---|---|---|---|---|---|---|
| P | Jimmy Engoulvent | Jimmy Engoulvent | not awarded | not awarded | Tom Dumoulin | Saur–Sojasun |
| 1 | André Greipel | Jimmy Engoulvent | André Greipel | Albert Timmer | Tom Dumoulin | Saur–Sojasun |
| 2 | André Greipel | Jimmy Engoulvent | André Greipel | Albert Timmer | Tom Dumoulin | Saur–Sojasun |
| 3 | Wout Poels | Jakob Fuglsang | André Greipel | Albert Timmer | Wout Poels | RadioShack–Nissan |
| 4 | Jürgen Roelandts | Jakob Fuglsang | André Greipel | Albert Timmer | Wout Poels | RadioShack–Nissan |
| Final | | Jakob Fuglsang | André Greipel | Albert Timmer | Wout Poels | RadioShack–Nissan |
