= Jakob Fuglsang =

Danish road racing cyclist

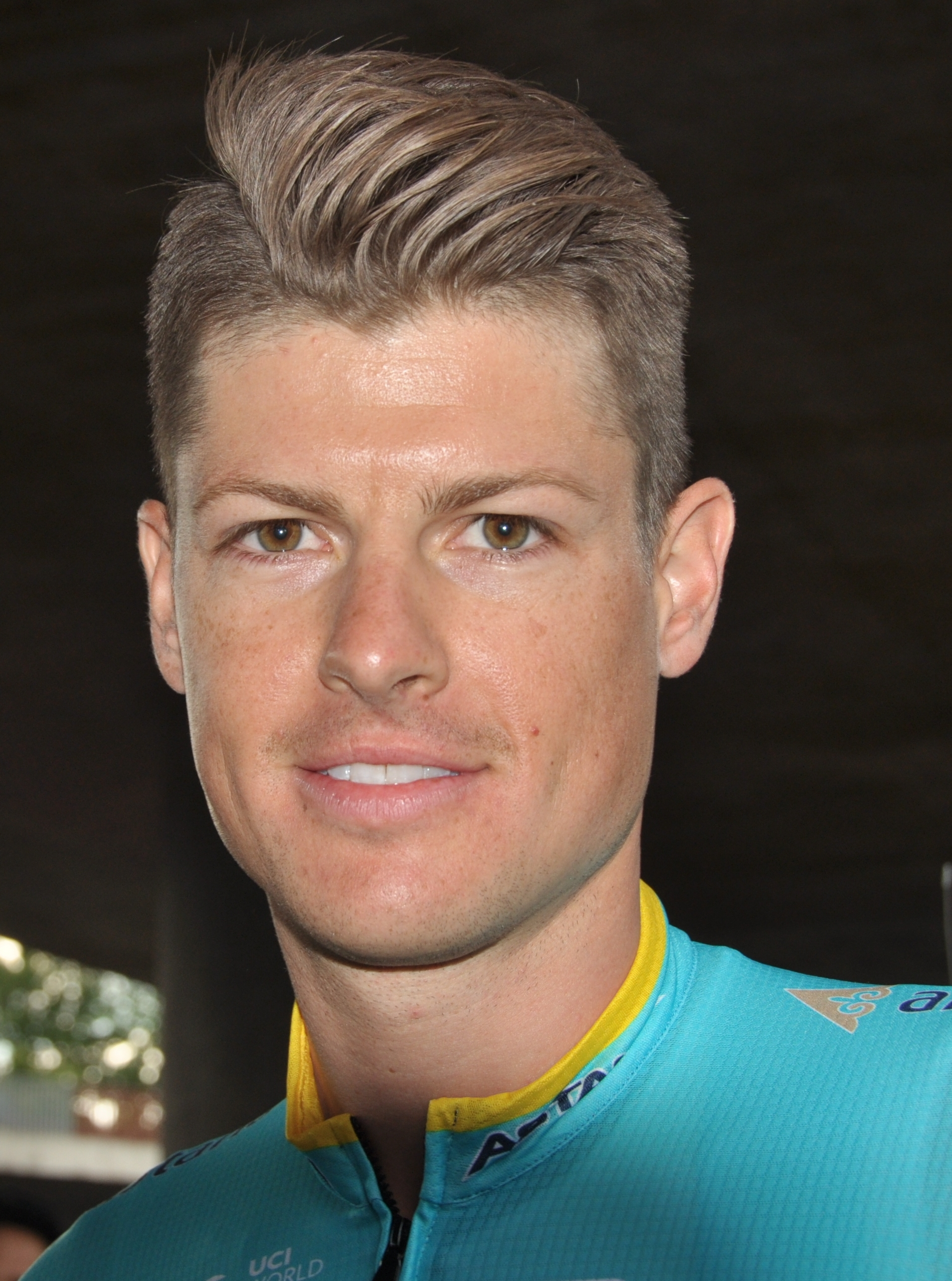
- Fuglsang at the 2017 Tour de France

Personal information
- Full name: Jakob Diemer Fuglsang
- Nicknames: King in the North, Fuglen, Birdsong, Birdy
- Born: 22 March 1985 (age 41) Geneva, Switzerland
- Height: 1.81 m (5 ft 11 in)
- Weight: 65 kg (143 lb)

Cycling career
- Sport: Cycling
- Discipline: Road
- Role: Rider
- Rider type: All-rounder

Amateur team
- 2005: Heijdens–Ten Tusscher (MTB)

Professional teams
- 2006–2008: Cannondale–Vredestein (MTB)
- 2006–2008: Team Designa Køkken (road)
- 2008: CSC–Saxo Bank (stagiaire)
- 2009–2010: Team Saxo Bank
- 2011–2012: Leopard Trek
- 2013–2021: Astana
- 2022–2025: Israel–Premier Tech

Major wins
- Mountain bike Cape Epic (2008) Road Grand Tours Vuelta a España 1 individual stage (2019) 3 TTT stages (2011, 2013, 2019) Stage races Critérium du Dauphiné (2017, 2019) Danmark Rundt (2008, 2009, 2010) Vuelta a Andalucía (2019, 2020) Tour de Luxembourg (2012) Tour of Austria (2012) Tour of Slovenia (2009) One-day races and Classics National Time Trial Championships (2010, 2012) Liège–Bastogne–Liège (2019) Giro di Lombardia (2020)
Medal record
Representing Denmark
Men's road bicycle racing
Olympic Games
Silver medal – second place	2016 Rio de Janeiro	Elite road race
Men's mountain bike racing
World Championships
Gold medal – first place	2007 Fort William	Under-23 Cross-country
European Championships
Silver medal – second place	2003 Graz	Junior Cross-country
Bronze medal – third place	2008 Sankt Wendel	Cross-country
Bronze medal – third place	2007 Cappadocia	Under-23 Cross-country

Jakob Diemer Fuglsang (born 22 March 1985) is a Danish former professional road racing cyclist. Before turning professional for Team Saxo Bank, he was a mountain biker racing for Team Cannondale–Vredestein, winning the Under-23 World Cup and Under-23 World Championships. He retired in June 2025 at the end of the Giro d'Italia.

Fuglsang has finished 7th overall at the Tour de France and 6th at the Giro d'Italia, his best result at a Grand Tour. His best career results are his win in the 2019 Liège–Bastogne–Liège, the 2020 Il Lombardia and his overall wins in both the 2017 and 2019 editions of the Critérium du Dauphiné stage race, in the former of which he won two stages. He has also won several other stage races during his career including Danmark Rundt 3 times in a row from 2008 to 2010, Tour de Luxembourg and Tour of Austria in 2012, and Tour of Slovenia in 2009.

== Career ==
=== Early years (2006–2008) ===
For the 2006 season Fuglsang rode his first year as a professional mountain biker for Cannondale-Vredestein.

In 2007 Fuglsang moved to Italy in order to focus on riding his bike. It was a hard year for Fuglsang as he had no friends in the area and had no visits from his family. Despite being alone it allowed him to focus on his mountain bike career. The biggest event of his 2007 season came in September where he would ride the Under-23 UCI Mountain Bike World Championships. His biggest rival at the event was Swiss rider Nino Schurter. They had competed in GP Tell just weeks before the event where Fuglsang finished 3rd and Schurter 8th. However, when they approached the final of the race Schurter was in the lead but Fuglsang was closing in on the Swiss and overtook him on the final lap on an uphill section. Fuglsang could cross the line as Under-23 World Champion. After the event Fuglsang got tattooed the rainbow stripes on his right arm.

The following year Fuglsang decided to focus more on road racing, however he would still ride mountain bikes races. After having finished 2nd overall with teammate Roal Paulissen in Cape Epic in 2007, he came back with Paulissen again the following year and claimed the overall win. He was leading the 2008 edition of Danmark Rundt heading into the last stage. He had been in contact with Team Saxo Bank, and the deal was finally signed the day before he won Danmark Rundt. Despite having signed the contract, Fuglsang's manager wanted him to wait as his market value could inflate if he won Danmark Rundt which he did the following day.

=== Team Saxo Bank (2009–2010) ===
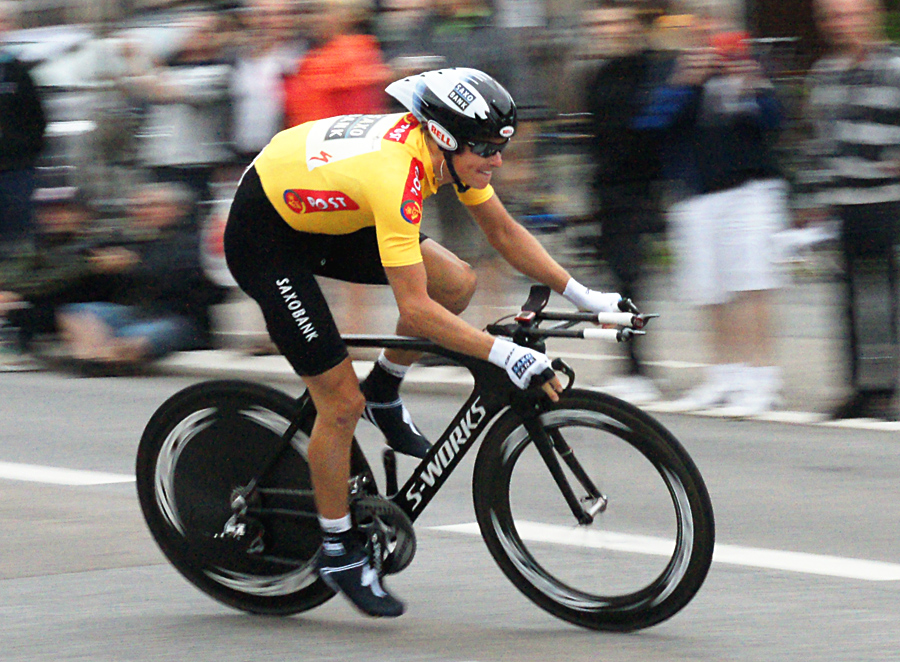
Fuglsang in the leaders jersey at the 2009 Danmark Rundt

Fuglsang rode his first World Tour season in 2009, riding for Team Saxo Bank which was led by Bjarne Riis. He had a great first year with finishing 6th overall in the Volta a Catalunya and Critérium du Dauphiné Libéré. Fuglsang won his second Danmark Rundt in August and had also won Tour of Slovenia one and a half months previous. He rode his first Grand Tour in August and September when he started in the Vuelta a España. He crashed in the first couple stages when he rode into the back of a tanker due to limiting road control. Later in the season he finished 2nd in the Italian classic Giro dell'Emilia.

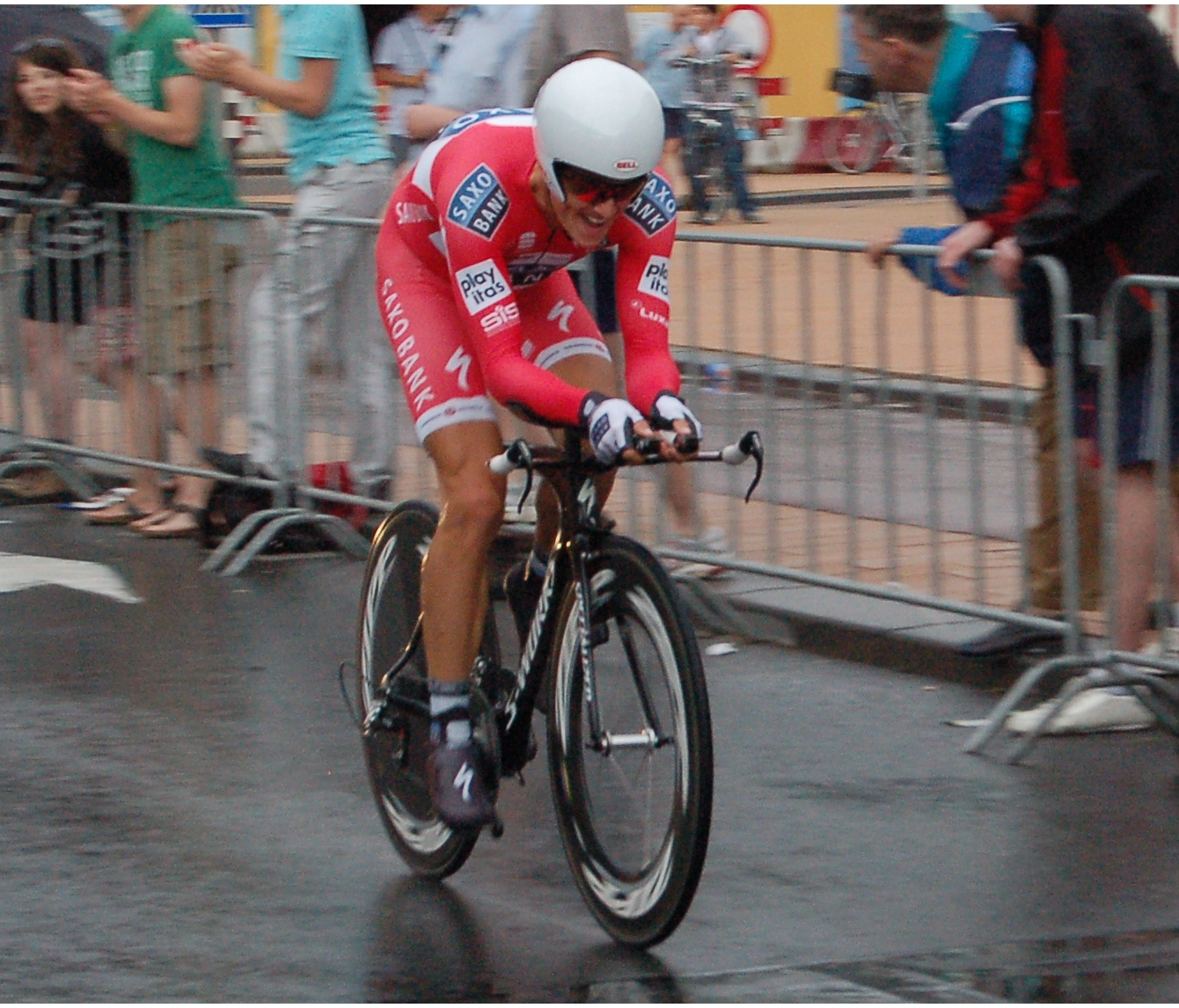
Fuglsang riding the 2010 Tour de France prologue in his Danish National Time Trial jersey

The following year would be a controversial year for Team Saxo Bank. It was uncertain whether the team would continue in 2011 due to a lack of sponsorship interest. Fuglsang wanted to stay at the team but got a great offer from Leopard Trek which was enough to persuade him. In June Fuglsang finished 3rd overall in the Tour de Suisse and won the Danish National Time Trial Championships for the first time in his career. In July 2010, Fuglsang started his first ever Tour de France. Despite most of the team set to leave in the 2011 season, Riis managed the team well and Andy Schleck would end up winning the race due to Alberto Contador's Clenbuterol case. Following the Tour de France, Fuglsang won his third Danmark Rundt in a row. In his last race for Team Saxo Bank, Fuglsang finished 4th in Giro di Lombardia after beating Vincenzo Nibali in a sprint.

=== Leopard Trek (2011–2012) ===
==== 2011: Grand Tour leaders jersey ====
In the 2011 season, Fuglsang was riding for the new Luxembourgish team Leopard Trek funded by Flavio Becca. Fuglsang had a mixed start to his season with finishing 11th at Tour of Oman before abandoning at Paris-Nice. He finished 3rd on the Time trial at Critérium International and 4th on the Time trial at Tour of the Basque Country. He had to wait until the middle of April to get his first top result of the season. Fuglsang rode Amstel Gold Race where an attack on Cauberg saw Philippe Gilbert take the victory. Fuglsang could not quite follow the pace but managed to finish 4th just 5 seconds behind Gilbert. It was decided from the start of the season that Fuglsang would ride the Tour de France as a domestique for the Schleck brothers, and he showcased great form in his final stage race before the Tour. Delivering yet another great Time trial, Fuglsang finished 4th overall in the Tour de Suisse. In June he also finished 2nd in the Danish National Time Trial Championships. Arriving at the 2011 Tour de France, Leopard Trek was one of the favorites to take the win. After the first 8 stages, Fränk Schleck was 3rd, Fuglsang 5th and Andy Schleck 6th. Later in the race Fuglsang dropped out of the top 10 but the Tour was still a success with Andy Schleck taking a stage win and 2nd overall, and Fränk Schleck taking 3rd overall. Fuglsang participated in the Vuelta a España where Leopard Trek won the Opening Team Time Trial with Fuglsang crossing the line in first position. This meant that Fuglsang would wear the Red Leaders jersey on the following stage. Fuglsang was just the second Danish rider to wear the jersey, which was previously worn by Lars Michaelsen. His teammate Daniele Bennati took over the lead on stage 2. Fuglsang put in another great Time trial on stage 10 and finished 6th which moved him up to 2nd overall. However, later in the race he would drop to 11th overall.

==== 2012: Excluded from World Tour races ====
In 2012, Fuglsang remained with the Schleck brothers, as the team became RadioShack–Nissan. He was slated to be his team's leader in the 2012 Giro d'Italia, but had to withdraw due to knee problems and was replaced with Fränk Schleck. Fuglsang later won the Tour de Luxembourg, taking the overall classification jersey in the queen stage to Differdange and then defending his lead with the help of his team for the fourth and final stage in Luxembourg City. The last stage had to be shortened by 47 km (29 mi) by the organizers due to heavy rain. He was then excluded from the Tour de France by the RadioShack–Nissan team management after he had criticized them. He stated that he wanted to race for another squad in the next season since he was not happy with the way things were going within the team. In his book released in collaboration with Rasmus Staghøj in 2018, Fuglsang wrote that there was no real structure around the team. RadioShack–Nissan was the result of a merger between the two teams: Leopard Trek and Team RadioShack. During races and training camps the team was often split and racing as two teams, not one. Having phoned the general manager Johan Bruyneel, it was confirmed that Fuglsang was not riding any more World Tour races in 2012. As Fuglsang had just won the Danish National Time Trial Championships for the second time in his career, he went to Austria to ride the Tour of Austria. Fuglsang won stage 4 and the overall race ahead of Steve Morabito of BMC Racing Team who finished one minute and 24 seconds behind the Dane.

=== Astana (2013–2021) ===
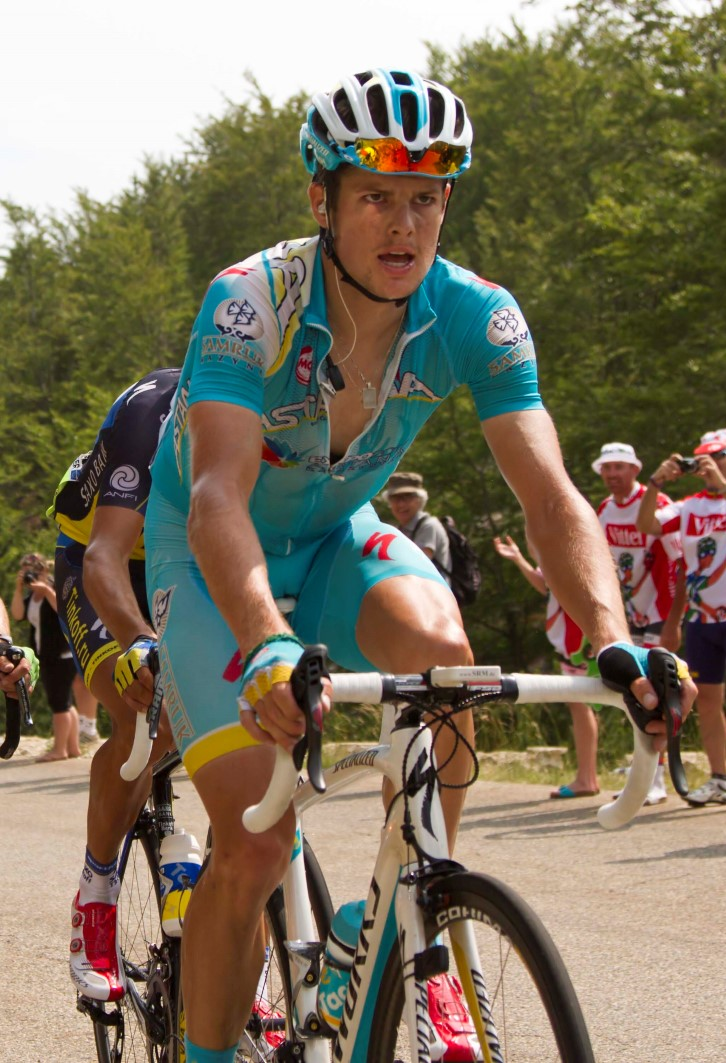
Fuglsang at the 2013 Tour de France

==== 2013: 7th overall at the Tour de France ====
Fuglsang left RadioShack–Nissan at the end of the 2012 season, and joined Astana on an initial three-year contract from the 2013 season onwards. In the 2013 Tour de France, Fuglsang was the team leader of Astana. As Dan Martin attacked on stage 9, Fuglsang saw it as a perfect opportunity to gain time on the other contenders, and attacked with Martin. They got a gap straight away, and started to work together. Inside the final kilometers it was clear to see that the bunch could not catch them. Fuglsang led out the sprint from the front, and as Martin attacked, he could not follow and had to settle with 2nd place. It was not until stage 13 that Fuglsang again was on the offence, when Saxo–Tinkoff attacked during sections of crosswinds. Fuglsang was the only rider from Astana in the break and finished 4th on the stage, advancing to 6th overall. His efforts on that stage gained praise from his team-mates and staff. From then on, Fuglsang battled with Dutch rider Bauke Mollema for the 6th place. Eventually he ended up finishing 7th overall, after a good performance in the mountains and the time trials. Later that year he helped team-mate Vincenzo Nibali to the Italian's second place at the Vuelta a España.

==== 2014: Helping Vincenzo Nibali win the Tour de France ====
Throughout the spring of the 2014 season, Fuglsang showed he had consistent form at the major World Tour stage races. He was set to help Vincenzo Nibali win the 2014 Tour de France. However the Italian rider showed no results before the Critérium du Dauphiné. On the final stage of the one-week stage race, Nibali attacked but was later dropped due to his efforts. Fuglsang was then ordered to pace Nibali up the final climb, but when the pace kept getting slower, Fuglsang was then finally ordered to ride his own chance. This sparked a lot of controversy at Astana since the leader for the Tour de France, was weaker than his domestique.

On stage 2 of Tour de France, Fuglsang attacked a few times until Nibali managed to get away and win the stage in the end. Just a few days later, Fuglsang and Nibali were riding together on the cobblestone stage and dropped all the other contenders. However, on the final sector of cobblestones, Nibali was once again having problems, and could not close the gap to Lars Boom who rode away in the distance and won the stage. Fuglsang had to slow down his pace in order to get Nibali to the finish line, and once again Fuglsang finished second on a Tour de France stage. After the stage, Nibali was first overall and Fuglsang second overall. However, on the first climbing stage, Fuglsang showed weakness and dropped to fourth overall. On the following stages he dropped out of the top 10, and lost even more time on stage 13 when he hit a bottle on the downhill to the final climb. The remainder of the race became a challenge for Fuglsang who finished 36th overall.

==== 2015: Hunting a Tour de France stage win ====
Having finished 7th overall at both the Tour of Oman and Paris-Nice, Fuglsang also cracked the top ten in two of the three Ardennes Classics, finishing eighth at La Flèche Wallonne and ninth at Liège–Bastogne–Liège. His main goal of the season was to help Vincenzo Nibali defend his 2014 Tour de France title. However already on the first mountain stage, Nibali looked vulnerable and Fuglsang was awarded his own chance by the Astana team. Fuglsang did a great final climb but only finished 13th because of acting as domestique to Nibali. The Astana team then said they were going to focus on Fuglsang for the remainder of the race. However, on the following day Fuglsang lost a lot of time, with Nibali only losing a minute. The final day in the Pyrenees saw the race heading up Plateau de Beille, and Fuglsang was in a 22-man breakaway. As the group was heading up the final climb, more riders were dropped from the group and Joaquim Rodríguez attacked with no one able to match the Spaniard's pace. Rodríguez won the stage with 1:12 down to Jakob Fuglsang who arrived at the soaking wet finish line in 2nd place. In probably his last chance for a stage win, Fuglsang went all in on stage 18 of the race. He was once again a part of a huge group which became smaller as it approached the Col du Glandon. It was clear that Fuglsang had a shot at winning the stage, but he was taken down by a motorbike which was about to pass the group. This ended his chances of a stage win and the driver of the motorbike was later ejected from the race.

==== 2016: Olympic Silver medal ====
As the final preparation race for the 2016 Giro d'Italia, Fuglsang rode the Giro del Trentino. Fuglsang finished the race in 3rd overall with team-mate Tanel Kangert finishing 2nd overall. The team leader for the Giro, Nibali only finished 21st overall. On the first decisive day in the Giro d'Italia, Nibali attacked but was again dropped after his attack. Fuglsang followed the other contenders and even attacked inside the final kilometer and finished 2nd, and also advancing to 2nd place overall. Two days later Fuglsang lost time to the other contenders as he punctured on a gravel sector. After making a comeback in the final week of the race, Nibali ended up winning the Giro d'Italia with help from Fuglsang and his Astana team. At the Tour de France, Fuglsang was missing form but attacked on the final mountain stage but had no luck in going for the win on that stage. The team leader of Astana, Fabio Aru also cracked on that stage which meant Astana left the Tour de France empty handed.

At the 2016 Olympic Games in Rio de Janeiro Fuglsang was in the chaser group descending the final climb, when two of the main-favorites Vincenzo Nibali and Richie Porte crashed. Going into the final kilometers Rafał Majka was alone in the front but an attack from Fuglsang and Greg Van Avermaet meant that a trio had formed inside the last 1.5 kilometers. Going into the sprint Fuglsang was leading the trio inside the final kilometer, with Van Avermaet opening the sprint inside the final 200 meters beating Fuglsang at the line. This meant a gold medal for Van Avermaet, silver for Fuglsang and bronze for Majka. Following his silver medal in the Olympic Games, Fuglsang started showing more aggressive racing for the following seasons.

==== 2017: Winning the Critérium du Dauphiné ====
In June 2017 Fuglsang rode the Critérium du Dauphiné alongside Italian team-mate Fabio Aru as the leader. On stage 6, Fuglsang attacked on Mont du Chat, and got a gap on the general classification contenders. However, Aru also attacked a few minutes after which sparked a lot of debate since his team-mate was at the front of the race. Aru reached the top of the climb first with Chris Froome, Richie Porte and Jakob Fuglsang 15 seconds behind. On the downhill Aru was caught and the quartet reached the finish line together with Fuglsang winning the stage. This was a huge relief for Fuglsang as this was his first win in almost five years, and his first world tour win and first win in Astana colors. On the following day, Fuglsang finished 7th and was the only rider who could keep up with Porte, which meant he maintained his 3rd place in the general classification. On the last day of the race, Fuglsang showed a strong performance. Froome and Team Sky did everything to win and attacked early on the stage which cracked race leader Porte. It was clear to see that Froome were doing everything he could to boost his gap down to Porte. However he had used too much energy on the stage, and cracked up the final climb. Dan Martin then attacked and Fuglsang attacked a little later, and managed to chase down Martin, and blast pass him as Fuglsang won his second stage in just three days. Not only did he win the stage but Fuglsang also won the overall race, which was the biggest win of his career.

Going into the Tour de France, Fuglsang was now considered one of the top favorites. On the first mountain stage, Fuglsang lost over a minute and started doubting if he had lost the form he had one month earlier. He bounced back on the queen stage of the race on stage 9 that included Mont du Chat which Fuglsang had ridden one month previous at the Critérium du Dauphiné. Having a great knowledge of the climb, Fuglsang attacked just as in the Dauphiné but once again an attack was made by team-mate Fabio Aru. This sparked a lot of debate as the Italian attacked his own team-mate and attacked when Chris Froome had a mechanical. Eventually Fuglsang reached the downhill with the other general classification contenders as they hunted down Warren Barguil for the stage win. Fuglsang attacked inside the final 500 meters but was chased down by Rigoberto Urán and lost his chance for the stage win. Despite losing the stage win, Fuglsang had gained the 5th place overall. Days later he went down in a crash in the feeding zone and suffered fractures to his elbow and wrist. He abandoned the race on stage 13. At the Tour of Almaty, Fuglsang won stage 2 which finished on a climb to Almaty.

==== 2018: Team leader at the Tour de France ====
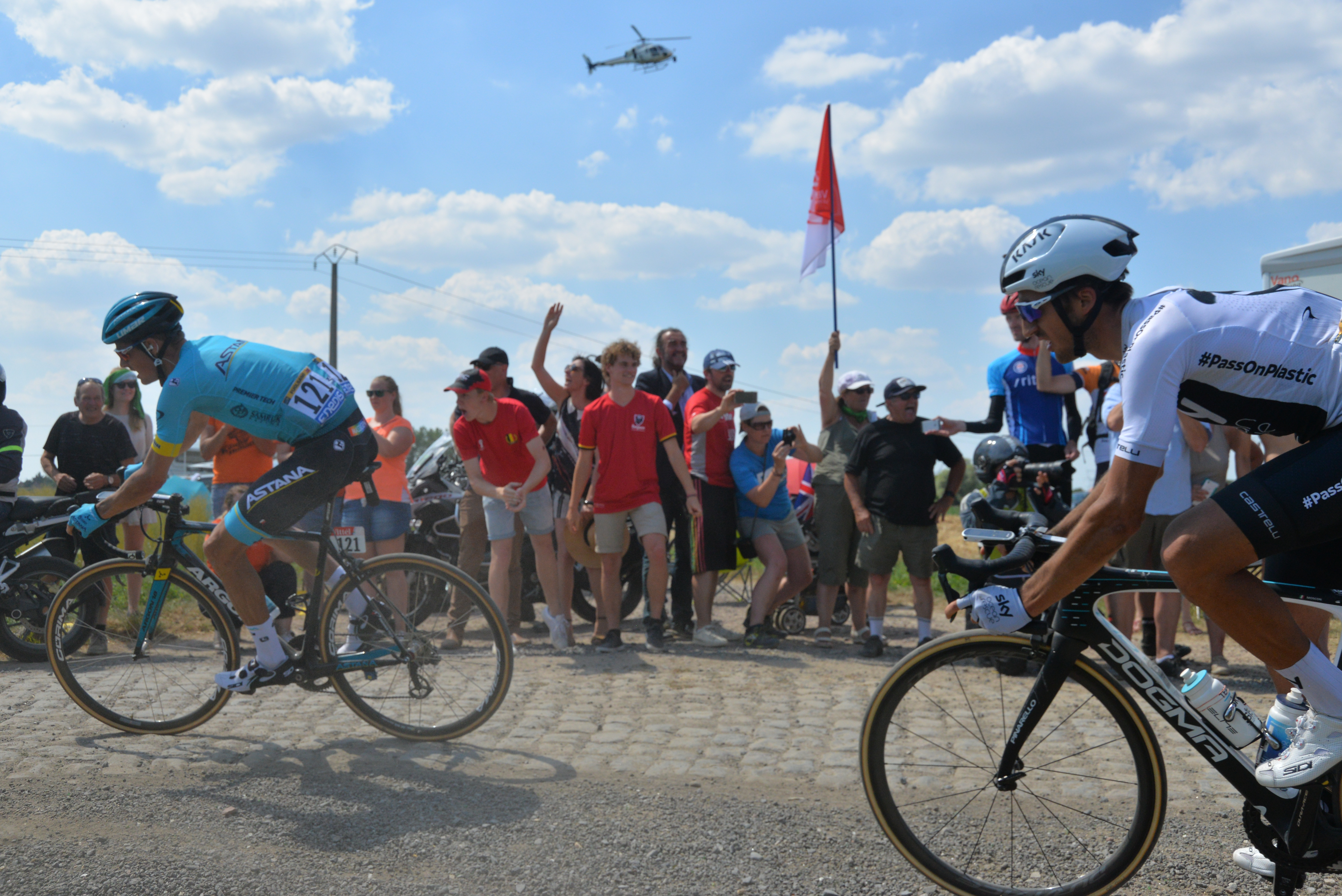
Fuglsang (left) on the cobblestones during stage 9 of the 2018 Tour de France.

At his first race of the season, Fuglsang finished 3rd in the Spanish stage race "Volta a la Comunitat Valenciana". He scored another top 10 finish one week later at the Vuelta a Murcia, placing 6th. In the middle of February, Fuglsang rode the Vuelta a Andalucía, where he was 4th overall. Fuglsang arrived at Paris-Nice with hopes of riding for the general classification, however he was involved in a crash on the first stage, and lost time as he did the previous year. As his team-mate Luis León Sánchez was in the leaders jersey, Fuglsang helped his team-mate throughout the race, but when Sanchez cracked on stage 7, Fuglsang got his own chance with a few kilometers to go, and finished 9th on the stage.

His next attempt to improve form after the opening stage races of the year was the first altitude training camp for the Tour de France. His first races back after his training camp were the Ardennes Classics, where he managed to finish 8th at Amstel Gold Race and 10th at Liège–Bastogne–Liège, as his best results. Fuglsang was ready to race again only two days later, when he started Tour de Romandie. After a disappointing time trial on stage 3, he attacked on the downhill of the last climb on stage 4, and took his first win of the season. He finished inside the bunch on the final stage, which meant he finished 4th overall.

Fuglsang then went to altitude training camp once again to focus for the Tour de France. On 1 June, Fuglsang published his first book which he made in collaboration with Rasmus Staghøj.

His last race before "La Grand Boucle" was Tour de Suisse. Fuglsang and his Astana team-mates got off to a very bad start to the race, only finishing 20th in the team time trial on stage 1. Fuglsang recovered and finished 2nd on the queen stage, and delivered the best time trial of the general classification contenders on stage 9, advancing Fuglsang to 2nd place overall. When Fuglsang arrived at the Tour de France however, his first week was full of chaotic moments. He was ninth on the first stage but with one man down on stage 3, Astana almost lost a minute in the team time trial. As the race hit the region of Brittany, Fuglsang was dealing with crashes and mechanical problems. He managed to overcome the problems and advanced to 7th place in the general classification after the cobbled classics stage, a stage in which Fuglsang attacked but had no luck of getting away from the bunch. As the race hit the Alps, Fuglsang was near top 3 overall, but cracked on stage 11 and dropped to 12th overall. For the rest of the race, he was struggling to keep up with the other general classification contenders and finished 12th overall in Paris.

Fuglsang returned to racing after 2.5 weeks at Arctic Race of Norway where he was in the breakaway on stage 2, and finished 9th on the stage. At the Canadian World Tour classic Grand Prix Cycliste de Montréal, Fuglsang was in a late breakaway with Tim Wellens (Lotto–Soudal) and James Knox (Quick-Step Floors), but was brought back by the bunch with 6.2 kilometers to go. In late September, Fuglsang rode the UCI Road World Championships, and finished 20th. One week later, Fuglsang was 11th at Giro dell'Emilia.

==== 2019: Winning Liège–Bastogne–Liège and the Criterium de Dauphiné ====
Fuglsang started his 2019 season at Vuelta a Murcia where he finished 6th in the general classification. He also won the Mountains classification at the race. His next success would already come in the following week, where he won Vuelta a Andalucía in front of other Tour favourites. He rode his first big classic of the season in Strade Bianche where he finished 2nd behind Julian Alaphilippe. Fuglsang attacked several times in the final but could not drop the Frenchman, who ended up outsprinting Fuglsang on the last climb. At Tirreno-Adriatico the Astana Team made a poor effort in the Team time trial and only finished 13th. On stage 5 to Recanati, Fuglsang attacked and made a huge effort on the hard stage. He ended up winning and made a jump to 3rd in the general classification which would be his final position in the race. Fuglsang dedicated his win on Stage 5 to his former team-mate Michele Scarponi.

In his next race at Tour of the Basque Country, Fuglsang rode in honour of his team-mate Ion Izagirre who would go on to win the overall race. Izagirre took the race lead on the final day from Emanuel Buchmann, who would also make an error in the final turn. The German cyclist took the wrong turn which caused him to lose several seconds and ultimately his podium place. However the race jury decided to reinstate Buchmann on the podium, which dropped Fuglsang down to 4th place overall. Fuglsang found the decision "ridiculous" and said he had never seen anything like it before.

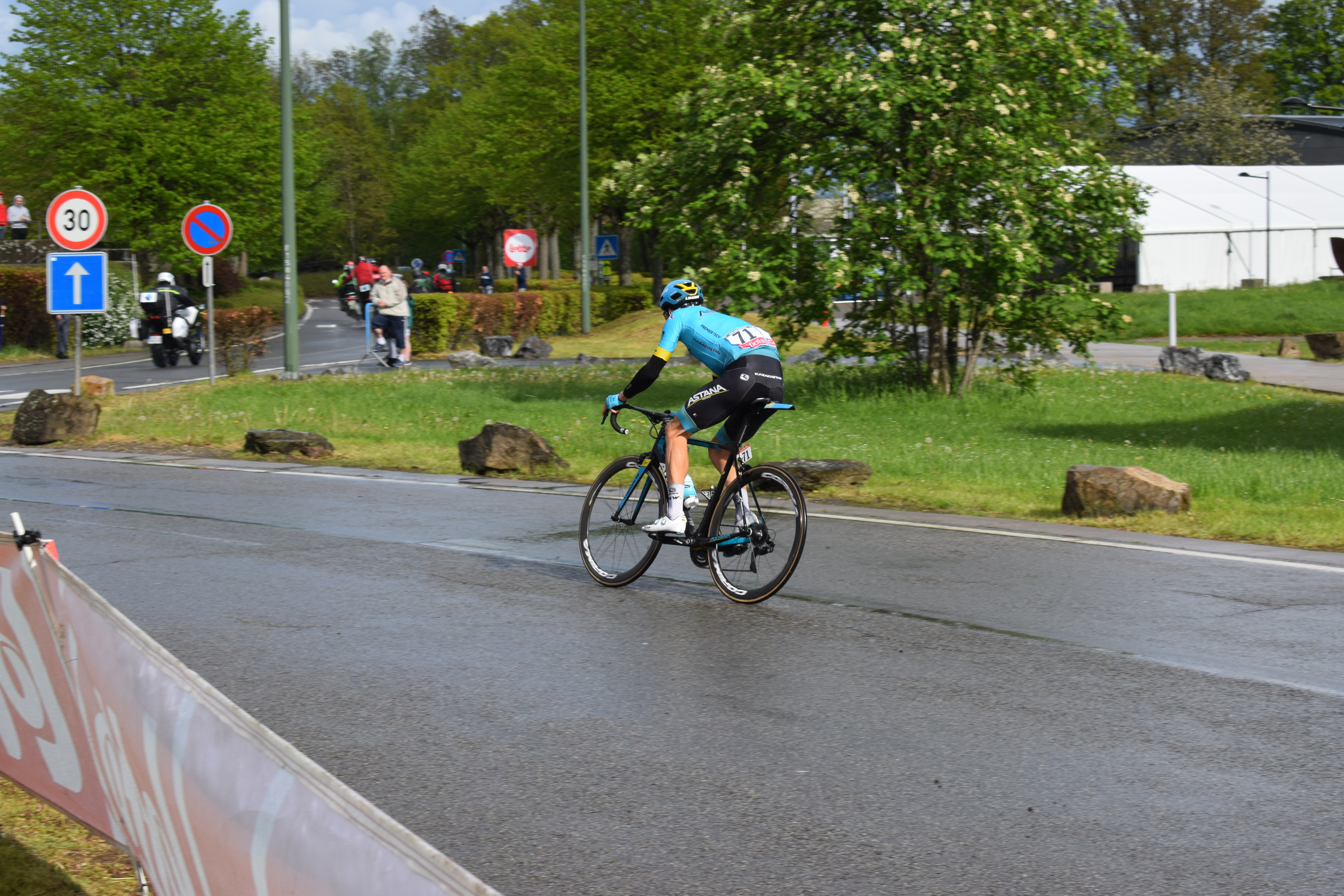
Fuglsang on his way to winning the 2019 Liège–Bastogne–Liège

Fuglsang rode an amazing Ardennes Classics week where he finished on the podium in all three races. At Amstel Gold Race, Fuglsang rode away with Alaphilippe, and they looked to fight out the win, however they slowed down drastically in the final kilometre which allowed the chasing group to bridge the gap to the leaders. Ultimately Fuglsang finished 3rd, and Alaphilippe 4th. At La Flèche Wallonne Fuglsang attacked on Muur de Huy, and only Alaphilippe could follow. It was once again a battle between Fuglsang and Alaphilippe as the Frenchman outsprinted the Dane. At the final classics race Liège–Bastogne–Liège, Fuglsang was the favourite, and he delivered despite huge pressure. He attacked in the final stages and dropped everyone, however he nearly crashed with 3 kilometres to go, but a miraculous save from Fuglsang secured him his first win in a monument classics. At his final race before the Tour de France, Fuglsang finished 3rd on Stage 2 at Critérium du Dauphiné, and proved he was one of the strongest candidates for the overall Tour win. He would take the yellow jersey on the penultimate day after attacking and dropping Adam Yates. His nearest rival for the overall win, Yates abandoned the race due to a fever. Thibaut Pinot tried an attack inside the final two kilometres, however Fuglsang quickly closed it down, and won his second Critérium du Dauphiné.

==== 2020: Second monument win ====
Fuglsang started his 2020 campaign with a repeat victory in the Spanish stage race Vuelta a Andalucía. Aside from winning the general classification, Fuglsang also won two stages and finished 2nd on two other occasions. After the racing resumed in August, Fuglsang started with a 5th-place finish in the Italian neo-classic Strade Bianche, and a week later, he managed to come 2nd in the Tour de Pologne. On 15 August he took his first victory after the lockdown as he soloed his way to victory in the Italian monument race Il Lombardia. The victory in Lombardy was Fuglsang's second monument win, and it also marked the first time a Danish cyclist won the race.

In the UCI Road World Championships, Fuglsang finished 5th in the road race and thus improved on his previous best result, a 12th-place finish from the road race in 2019. Fuglsang came into the road race as a top favourite and rode a tactical race until the last ascent up Cima Gallisterna, where he came up just short against his classics rival and the eventual race winner Julian Alaphilippe. Alaphilippe escaped on the last climb and soloed to victory, while Fuglsang lost the sprint for silver and bronze medals in a chase group. He contested the Giro d'Italia, finishing sixth overall – his best Grand Tour finish to that point.

==== 2021 ====
In the first quarter of the season, Fuglsang finished in eighth place overall at the Tour des Alpes-Maritimes et du Var, and then in ninth place at Strade Bianche. At the Tour de Suisse, Fuglsang finished second on the fifth stage to Leukerbad, losing out on the uphill finish to Richard Carapaz; he ultimately finished the race in third place overall. His season ended following a crash at the Benelux Tour, resulting in fractures to his scapula and clavicle.

=== Israel–Premier Tech (2022–present) ===
In October 2021, Fuglsang was announced to be joining Israel Start-Up Nation, later renamed as Israel–Premier Tech, for the 2022 season.

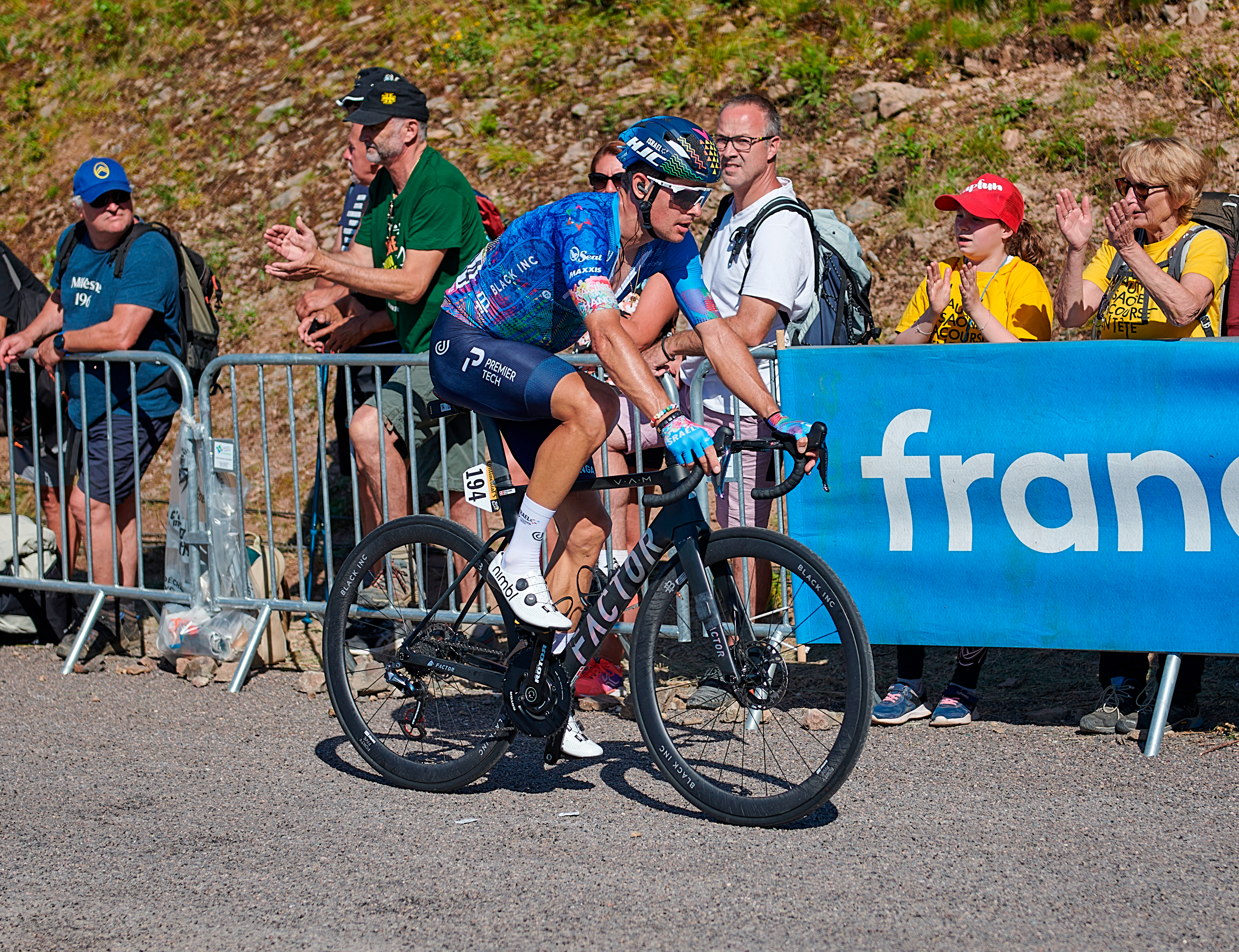
Fuglsang at the 2022 Tour de France

Fuglsang started his 2022 season racing in Spain, competing in the Volta a la Comunitat Valenciana and O Gran Camiño stage races, finishing in sixth and tenth respectively. He took his first victory with the team in May's Mercan'Tour Classic, attacking out of the lead group with approximately 7 kilometres (4.3 miles) remaining, and ultimately led home a team 1–2 with Michael Woods getting the better of David Gaudu. He finished third overall for the second year in succession at the Tour de Suisse, also spending a day in the leader's jersey. He withdrew from the Tour de France, following a crash which resulted in a fractured rib.

Fuglsang rode only four races in the first half of 2023, finishing only two – the Tour de Hongrie, and the Mercan'Tour Classic, both held in May. His racing was reduced due to suffering from epididymitis, following his withdrawal from the UAE Tour.

== Personal life ==
Jakob Fuglsang lives in Monaco with his wife Loulou, whom he married in 2015. The couple have a daughter, Jamie Lou who was born in June 2017. Before moving to Monaco, Jakob and Loulou lived in Luxembourg where Fuglsang trained together with Andy Schleck and Fränk Schleck. His wife Loulou gave up her own chances of a modelling career in order to support Fuglsang in his sporting career.

== Major results ==
=== Mountain bike ===
2002
1st Cross-country, National Junior Championships
2003
1st Cross-country, National Junior Championships
2nd Cross-country, UEC European Junior Championships
2007
1st Cross-country, UCI World Under-23 Championships
1st Marathon, National Championships
2nd Overall Cape Epic (with Roel Paulissen)
3rd Cross-country, UEC European Under-23 Championships
2008
1st Overall Cape Epic (with Roel Paulissen)
3rd Cross-country, UEC European Championships

=== Road ===
2007
3rd Overall GP Tell
5th Paris–Troyes
7th Overall Danmark Rundt
10th Overall Ringerike GP
2008 (1 pro win)
1st Overall Danmark Rundt
2nd Overall Les 3 Jours de Vaucluse
2nd Overall Ronde de l'Oise
3rd Paris–Troyes
8th Les Boucles du Sud-Ardèche
2009 (4)
1st Overall Tour of Slovenia

1st Stage 1

1st Overall Danmark Rundt

1st Stage 3

2nd Giro dell'Emilia
3rd Time trial, National Championships
6th Overall Volta a Catalunya
6th Overall Critérium du Dauphiné Libéré
10th Overall Tour of Ireland
2010 (2)
1st Time trial, National Championships
1st Overall Danmark Rundt
2nd Binche–Chimay–Binche
2nd Gran Premio Bruno Beghelli
3rd Overall Tour de Suisse
3rd Overall Circuit Franco-Belge
4th Giro di Lombardia
9th GP Herning
2011 (1)
Vuelta a España

1st Stage 1 (TTT)
Held Stage 2

1st Stage 3 Danmark Rundt
2nd Time trial, National Championships
4th Overall Tour de Suisse
4th Amstel Gold Race
10th Time trial, UCI World Championships
2012 (4)
1st Time trial, National Championships
1st Overall Tour of Austria

1st Stage 4

1st Overall Tour de Luxembourg
4th Trofeo Deià
6th Overall USA Pro Cycling Challenge
2013
1st Stage 1 (TTT) Vuelta a España
4th Overall Critérium du Dauphiné
6th Overall Vuelta a Andalucía
7th Overall Tour de France
8th Vuelta a Murcia
2014
5th Overall Paris–Nice
7th Overall Tour de Romandie
10th Overall Critérium du Dauphiné
2015
4th Time trial, National Championships
7th Overall Tour of Oman
7th Overall Paris–Nice
8th La Flèche Wallonne
9th Liège–Bastogne–Liège
2016
2nd Road race, Olympic Games
3rd Overall Tour of Oman
3rd Overall Giro del Trentino

1st Stage 1 (TTT)

2017 (4)
1st Overall Critérium du Dauphiné

1st Stages 6 & 8

3rd Overall Tour of Almaty

1st Stage 2

6th Overall Volta a la Comunitat Valenciana
2018 (1)
2nd Overall Tour de Suisse
3rd Overall Volta a la Comunitat Valenciana
4th Overall Tour de Romandie

1st Stage 4

4th Overall Vuelta a Andalucía
6th Vuelta a Murcia
8th Amstel Gold Race
8th Milano–Torino
10th Liège–Bastogne–Liège
2019 (5)
1st Overall Critérium du Dauphiné
1st Overall Vuelta a Andalucía
1st Liège–Bastogne–Liège
Vuelta a España

1st Stages 1 (TTT) & 16

2nd Strade Bianche
2nd La Flèche Wallonne
3rd Overall Tirreno–Adriatico

1st Stage 5

3rd Amstel Gold Race
4th Overall Tour of the Basque Country
4th Giro di Lombardia
6th Overall Vuelta a Murcia

1st Mountains classification

8th Giro dell'Emilia
8th Milano–Torino
2020 (4)
1st Overall Vuelta a Andalucía

1st Points classification
1st Stages 1 & 3

1st Giro di Lombardia
2nd Overall Tour de Pologne
5th Road race, UCI World Championships
5th Strade Bianche
6th Overall Giro d'Italia
6th Giro dell'Emilia
2021
3rd Overall Tour de Suisse
8th Overall Tour des Alpes-Maritimes et du Var
9th Strade Bianche
2022 (1)
1st Mercan'Tour Classic
3rd Overall Tour de Suisse
6th Overall Volta a la Comunitat Valenciana
10th Overall O Gran Camiño
2023
5th Super 8 Classic
8th Overall Vuelta a Castilla y León

==== General classification results timeline ====
Grand Tour general classification results
Grand Tour	2009	2010	2011	2012	2013	2014	2015	2016	2017	2018	2019	2020	2021	2022	2023	2024	2025
Giro d'Italia	—	—	—	—	—	—	—	12	—	—	—	6	—	—	—	—	81
Tour de France	—	50	49	—	7	36	23	52	DNF	12	DNF	—	DNF	DNF	—	38	—
/ Vuelta a España	56	—	11	—	29	—	—	—	—	—	13	—	—	—	—	—	—
Major stage race general classification results
Major stage race	2009	2010	2011	2012	2013	2014	2015	2016	2017	2018	2019	2020	2021	2022	2023	2024	2025
Paris–Nice	27	93	DNF	—	DNF	5	7	—	12	14	—	—	—	—	—	49	—
Tirreno–Adriatico	—	—	—	—	—	—	—	13	—	—	3	14	21	41	—	—	84
Volta a Catalunya	6	—	—	DNF	11	11	—	—	15	—	—	NH	—	—	—	—	—
Tour of the Basque Country	17	37	35	—	31	—	—	—	63	—	4	NH	15	—	—	—	—
Tour de Romandie	—	—	—	DNF	—	7	17	—	—	4	—	NH	—	29	—	—	—
Critérium du Dauphiné	6	—	—	—	4	10	—	—	1	—	1	—	—	—	—	24	—
Tour de Suisse	—	3	4	25	DNF	—	DNF	—	—	2	—	NH	3	3	DNF	—	—

==== Classics results timeline ====
Monument	2009	2010	2011	2012	2013	2014	2015	2016	2017	2018	2019	2020	2021	2022	2023	2024	2025
Milan–San Remo	—	—	—	—	—	—	—	—	—	—	—	—	—	—	—	142	83
Tour of Flanders	—	—	—	—	—	—	—	25	—	—	—	—	—	—	—	—	—
Paris–Roubaix	Has not contested during his career																
Liège–Bastogne–Liège	84	55	31	—	32	26	9	68	15	10	1	—	12	13	—	84	96
Giro di Lombardia	15	4	39	—	—	—	—	29	DNF	20	4	1	—	71	—	54	—
Classic	2009	2010	2011	2012	2013	2014	2015	2016	2017	2018	2019	2020	2021	2022	2023	2024	2025
Strade Bianche	—	—	—	—	—	—	—	11	—	—	2	5	9	36	—	—	43
Amstel Gold Race	30	78	4	—	17	29	17	—	52	8	3	NH	38	16	—	76	—
La Flèche Wallonne	115	DNF	70	—	69	19	8	—	22	16	2	—	17	53	—	DNF	—
Clásica de San Sebastián	—	31	DNF	—	37	—	11	—	—	—	—	NH	—	—	—	—	—
Paris–Tours	—	—	—	12	—	—	—	—	—	—	—	—	—	—	—	—	—

==== Major championships timeline ====
Event		2008	2009	2010	2011	2012	2013	2014	2015	2016	2017	2018	2019	2020	2021	2022	2023	2024	2025
Olympic Games	Time trial	—	Not held			15	Not held			—	Not held				—	Not held		—	NH
Olympic Games	Road race	—	Not held			12	Not held			2	Not held				12	Not held		—	NH
World Championships	Time trial	—	—	—	10	37	—	—	—	—	—	—	—	—	—	—	—	—	—
World Championships	Road race	DNF	43	—	26	DNF	21	—	—	—	—	20	12	5	—	56	—	DNF	—
National Championships	Time trial	—	—	1	2	1	—	—	4	—	—	—	—	—	—	—	—	—	—
National Championships	Road race	—	—	—	—	6	48	—	8	—	—	—	—	—	36	—	—	—	—

Legend
—	Did not compete
DNF	Did not finish
DSQ	Disqualified
NH	Event not held
