= 2020 Vuelta a Murcia =

2020 UCI Europe Tour

Race details
- Dates: 14–15 February 2020
- Stages: 2
- Distance: 357.2 km (222.0 mi)
- Winning time: 8h 45' 55"

Results
| Jersey awarded to the overall winner | Winner | Xandro Meurisse (BEL) | (Circus–Wanty Gobert) |
| | Second | Josef Černý (CZE) | (CCC Team) |
| | Third | Lennard Kämna (GER) | (Bora–Hansgrohe) |
| Jersey awarded to the points classification winner | Points | Xandro Meurisse (BEL) | (Circus–Wanty Gobert) |
| Jersey awarded to the mountains classification winner | Mountains | Omar Fraile (ESP) | (Astana) |
| | Team | Astana | |

The 2020 Vuelta a Murcia was the 40th edition of the Vuelta a Murcia cycle race. It was from 14 to 15 February 2020 as a UCI Europe Tour category 2.1 race. The race was won by Xandro Meurisse of the Circus–Wanty Gobert team.

== Teams ==
Eighteen teams of up to seven riders started the race:

UCI WorldTeams

- Astana
- Movistar Team
- CCC Team
- Bora–Hansgrohe

UCI Professional Continental teams

- Sport Vlaanderen–Baloise
- Rally Cycling
- Arkéa–Samsic
- Burgos BH
- Bingoal–Wallonie Bruxelles
- Caja Rural–Seguros RGA
- Gazprom–RusVelo
- Circus–Wanty Gobert
- Riwal Readynez
- Fundación–Orbea

UCI Continental team

- Lokosphinx
- Equipo Kern Pharma
- Aviludo–Louletano
- Kometa Xstra Cycling Team

== Route ==
Stage characteristics and winners
| Stage | Date | Course | Distance | Type | Stage winner |
|---|---|---|---|---|---|
| 1 | 14 February | Los Alcázares to Caravaca de la Cruz | 177.6 km (110.4 mi) | Hilly stage | Xandro Meurisse (BEL) |
| 2 | 15 February | Santomera to Murcia | 179.6 km (111.6 mi) | Medium mountain stage | Luis León Sánchez (ESP) |

== Stages ==
=== Stage 1 ===
Stage 1 Result
| Rank | Rider | Team | Time |
|---|---|---|---|
| 1 | Xandro Meurisse (BEL) | Circus–Wanty Gobert | 4h 24' 00" |
| 2 | Adam de Vos (CAN) | Rally Cycling | + 4" |
| 3 | Josef Černý (CZE) | CCC Team | + 11" |
| 4 | Thibault Guernalec (FRA) | Arkéa–Samsic | + 11" |
| 5 | Lennard Kämna (GER) | Bora–Hansgrohe | + 17" |
| 6 | Nikita Stalnov (KAZ) | Astana | + 20" |
| 7 | Jefferson Cepeda (ECU) | Caja Rural–Seguros RGA | + 23" |
| 8 | Sergio García González (ESP) | Kometa Xstra Cycling Team | + 29" |
| 9 | Héctor Carretero (ESP) | Movistar Team | + 37" |
| 10 | Antonio Jesús Soto (ESP) | Fundación–Orbea | + 50" |

General classification after Stage 1
| Rank | Rider | Team | Time |
|---|---|---|---|
| 1 | Xandro Meurisse (BEL) | Circus–Wanty Gobert | 4h 24' 00" |
| 2 | Adam de Vos (CAN) | Rally Cycling | + 4" |
| 3 | Josef Černý (CZE) | CCC Team | + 11" |
| 4 | Thibault Guernalec (FRA) | Arkéa–Samsic | + 11" |
| 5 | Lennard Kämna (GER) | Bora–Hansgrohe | + 17" |
| 6 | Nikita Stalnov (KAZ) | Astana | + 20" |
| 7 | Jefferson Cepeda (ECU) | Caja Rural–Seguros RGA | + 23" |
| 8 | Sergio García González (ESP) | Kometa Xstra Cycling Team | + 29" |
| 9 | Héctor Carretero (ESP) | Movistar Team | + 37" |
| 10 | Antonio Jesús Soto (ESP) | Fundación–Orbea | + 50" |

=== Stage 2 ===
Stage 1 Result
| Rank | Rider | Team | Time |
|---|---|---|---|
| 1 | Luis León Sánchez (ESP) | Astana | 4h 21' 04" |
| 2 | Omar Fraile (ESP) | Astana | + 7" |
| 3 | Josef Černý (CZE) | CCC Team | + 7" |
| 4 | Xandro Meurisse (BEL) | Circus–Wanty Gobert | + 7" |
| 5 | Lennard Kämna (GER) | Bora–Hansgrohe | + 7" |
| 6 | Vicente García de Mateos (ESP) | Aviludo–Louletano | + 7" |
| 7 | Alejandro Valverde (ESP) | Movistar Team | + 20" |
| 8 | Felix Großschartner (AUT) | Bora–Hansgrohe | + 20" |
| 9 | Matteo Trentin (ITA) | CCC Team | + 20" |
| 10 | Kamil Małecki (POL) | CCC Team | + 5' 25" |

== Classification leadership table ==
| Stage | Winner | General classification | Mountains classification | Points classification | Teams classification |
|---|---|---|---|---|---|
| 1 | Xandro Meurisse | Xandro Meurisse | Nikita Stalnov | Xandro Meurisse | Arkéa–Samsic |
| 2 | Luis León Sánchez | Xandro Meurisse | Omar Fraile | Xandro Meurisse | Astana |
| Final | | Xandro Meurisse | Omar Fraile | Xandro Meurisse | Astana |

== Final classification standings ==
Final general classification
| Rank | Rider | Team | Time |
|---|---|---|---|
| 1 | Xandro Meurisse (BEL) | Circus–Wanty Gobert | 4h 24' 00" |
| 2 | Josef Černý (CZE) | CCC Team | + 11" |
| 3 | Lennard Kämna (GER) | Bora–Hansgrohe | + 17" |
| 4 | Thibault Guernalec (FRA) | Arkéa–Samsic | + 5' 49" |
| 5 | Nikita Stalnov (KAZ) | Astana | + 5' 58" |
| 6 | Jefferson Cepeda (ECU) | Caja Rural–Seguros RGA | + 6' 01" |
| 7 | Héctor Carretero (ESP) | Movistar Team | + 6' 15" |
| 8 | Sergio García González (ESP) | Kometa Xstra Cycling Team | + 11' 16" |
| 9 | Antonio Jesús Soto (ESP) | Fundación–Orbea | + 11' 35" |
| 10 | Adam de Vos (CAN) | Rally Cycling | + 12' 45" |

Final mountains classification
| Rank | Rider | Team | Points |
|---|---|---|---|
| 1 | Omar Fraile (ESP) | Astana | 18 |
| 2 | Nikita Stalnov (KAZ) | Astana | 18 |
| 3 | Lennard Kämna (GER) | Bora–Hansgrohe | 13 |
| 4 | Alejandro Valverde (ESP) | Movistar Team | 12 |
| 5 | Jefferson Cepeda (ECU) | Caja Rural–Seguros RGA | 10 |
| 6 | Vicente García de Mateos (ESP) | Aviludo–Louletano | 9 |
| 7 | Xandro Meurisse (BEL) | Circus–Wanty Gobert | 6 |
| 8 | Héctor Carretero (ESP) | Movistar Team | 6 |
| 9 | Óscar Rodríguez (ESP) | Astana | 6 |
| 10 | Nélson Oliveira (POR) | Movistar Team | 6 |

Final points classification
| Rank | Rider | Team | Points |
|---|---|---|---|
| 1 | Xandro Meurisse (BEL) | Circus–Wanty Gobert | 39 |
| 2 | Josef Černý (CZE) | CCC Team | 32 |
| 3 | Luis León Sánchez (ESP) | Astana | 25 |
| 4 | Lennard Kämna (GER) | Bora–Hansgrohe | 24 |
| 5 | Adam de Vos (CAN) | Rally Cycling | 20 |
| 6 | Omar Fraile (ESP) | Astana | 20 |
| 7 | Thibault Guernalec (FRA) | Arkéa–Samsic | 14 |
| 8 | Nikita Stalnov (KAZ) | Astana | 10 |
| 9 | Vicente García de Mateos (ESP) | Aviludo–Louletano | 10 |
| 10 | Alejandro Valverde (ESP) | Movistar Team | 10 |

Final teams classification (1–10)
| Rank | Team | Time |
|---|---|---|
| 1 | EF Pro Cycling | 26h 57' 07" |
| 2 | CCC Team | + 08" |
| 3 | Circus–Wanty Gobert | + 5' 237" |
| 4 | Bora–Hansgrohe | + 6' 45" |
| 5 | Movistar Team | + 11' 56" |
| 6 | Arkéa–Samsic | + 16' 39" |
| 7 | Caja Rural–Seguros RGA | + 21' 39" |
| 8 | Fundación–Orbea | + 22' 26" |
| 9 | Burgos BH | + 27' 45" |
| 10 | Bingoal–Wallonie Bruxelles | + 27' 49" |
