= 2020 Il Lombardia =

Cycling race

2020 UCI World Tour, race 10 of 21
- Official event poster

Race details
- Dates: 15 August 2020
- Stages: 1
- Distance: 231 km (143.5 mi)
- Winning time: 5h 32' 54"

Results
	Winner	Jakob Fuglsang (DEN)	(Astana)
	Second	George Bennett (NZL)	(Team Jumbo–Visma)
	Third	Aleksandr Vlasov (RUS)	(Astana)

The 2020 Il Lombardia was a one-day road cycling race that took place on 15 August 2020 in the Italian region of Lombardy. It was part of the 2020 UCI World Tour and was the 114th edition of Il Lombardia. The race was initially scheduled to take place on 10 October. The race was first rescheduled to 31 October with the May calendar update, and subsequently to 15 August with the June calendar update in order to not conflict with the major races that had been rescheduled, with the traditional spring races held in October and the Tour de France in late August to early September.

With around 50 kilometres to go, a select group, including defending champion Bauke Mollema and 2015 and 2017 winner Vincenzo Nibali, both of Trek–Segafredo, broke away from the peloton. On the descent of the Muro di Sormano, Belgian rider Remco Evenepoel of Deceuninck–Quick-Step crashed into a low wall on a bridge, somersaulting over it and into the ravine below. He suffered a fractured pelvis and a right lung contusion and had to abandon the race. Despite having three riders in the leading group of six, none of Trek–Segafredo's riders could keep up as Jakob Fuglsang of Astana accelerated away on the Civiglio climb, taking with him his Russian teammate Aleksandr Vlasov as well as New Zealander George Bennett of Team Jumbo–Visma. On the final climb, the San Fermo della Battaglia, Bennett put in several attacks that managed to shed Vlasov, but Fuglsang put in the winning move moments later and in turn dropped Bennett. Fuglsang soloed to victory and, in doing so, became the first Danish winner of the race. After Fuglsang had won, German rider Maximilian Schachmann of Bora–Hansgrohe was still several kilometres away from finishing, when he was side-swiped by an errant non-race car that drove across the road and his path, causing him to fall and become visibly upset and angry at race officials. As a result of the crash, Schachmann fractured his collarbone.

== Teams ==
Twenty-five teams, consisting of all 19 UCI WorldTeams and 6 UCI ProTeams, participated in the race. Each team entered seven riders with the exception of Circus–Wanty Gobert, which entered six. Of the 174 riders that started the race, 86 finished, while a further 18 riders finished over the time limit.

UCI WorldTeams

- AG2R La Mondiale
- Astana
- Bahrain–McLaren
- Bora–Hansgrohe
- CCC Team
- Deceuninck–Quick-Step
- EF Pro Cycling
- Groupama–FDJ
- Israel Start-Up Nation
- Lotto–Soudal
- Mitchelton–Scott
- Movistar Team
- NTT Pro Cycling
- Team Ineos
- Team Jumbo–Visma
- Team Sunweb
- Trek–Segafredo
- UAE Team Emirates

UCI Professional Continental teams

- Alpecin–Fenix
- Androni Giocattoli–Sidermec
- Bardiani–CSF–Faizanè
- Circus–Wanty Gobert
- Gazprom–RusVelo
- Vini Zabù–KTM

== Results ==
Result
Rank	Rider	Team	Time
1	Jakob Fuglsang (DEN)	Astana	5h 32' 54"
2	George Bennett (NZL)	Team Jumbo–Visma	+ 31"
3	Aleksandr Vlasov (RUS)	Astana	+ 51"
4	Bauke Mollema (NED)	Trek–Segafredo	+ 1' 19"
5	Giulio Ciccone (ITA)	Trek–Segafredo	+ 1' 40"
6	Vincenzo Nibali (ITA)	Trek–Segafredo	+ 3' 31"
7	Maximilian Schachmann (GER)	Bora–Hansgrohe	+ 4' 31"
8	Diego Ulissi (ITA)	UAE Team Emirates	+ 5' 20"
9	Ben Hermans (BEL)	Israel Start-Up Nation	+ 6' 00"
10	Mathieu van der Poel (NED)	Alpecin–Fenix	+ 6' 28"
