= Nikita Stalnov =

Kazakh cyclist

Personal information
- Full name: Nikita Stalnov
- Born: 14 September 1991 (age 35) Tselinograd, (now Astana, Kazakhstan)
- Height: 1.77 m (5 ft 10 in)
- Weight: 63 kg (139 lb)

Cycling career
- Sport: Cycling
- Current team: Retired
- Discipline: Road
- Role: Rider

Professional teams
- 2012–2016: Continental Team Astana
- 2017–2021: Astana

Nikita Serikovich Stalnov (Russian: Никита Серикович Стальнов, born 14 September 1991) is a Kazakhstani former cyclist, who last rode for UCI WorldTeam Astana–Premier Tech. He was named in the startlist for the 2017 and 2018 Vuelta a España. Stalnov retired from competition at the end of the 2021 season.

== Major results ==
2010
2nd Flèche Ardennaise
9th Overall Vuelta Independencia Nacional

1st Stage 3

2012
3rd Race Horizon Park
4th Overall La Tropicale Amissa Bongo

1st Stage 2

4th Ruota d'Oro
9th Overall Tour Alsace
2015
6th Tour of Almaty
6th Overall Tour of Bulgaria
7th Overall East Bohemia Tour
2016
3rd Overall Tour of Turkey
3rd Overall Tour d'Azerbaïdjan
3rd Overall Tour of Ukraine
2018
2nd Road race, National Road Championships
2020
5th Overall Vuelta a Murcia

=== Grand Tour general classification results timeline ===
Grand Tour	2017	2018
Giro d'Italia	—	—
Tour de France	—	—
Vuelta a España	145	104

Legend
—	Did not compete
DNF	Did not finish
