= Villanueva Mesía =

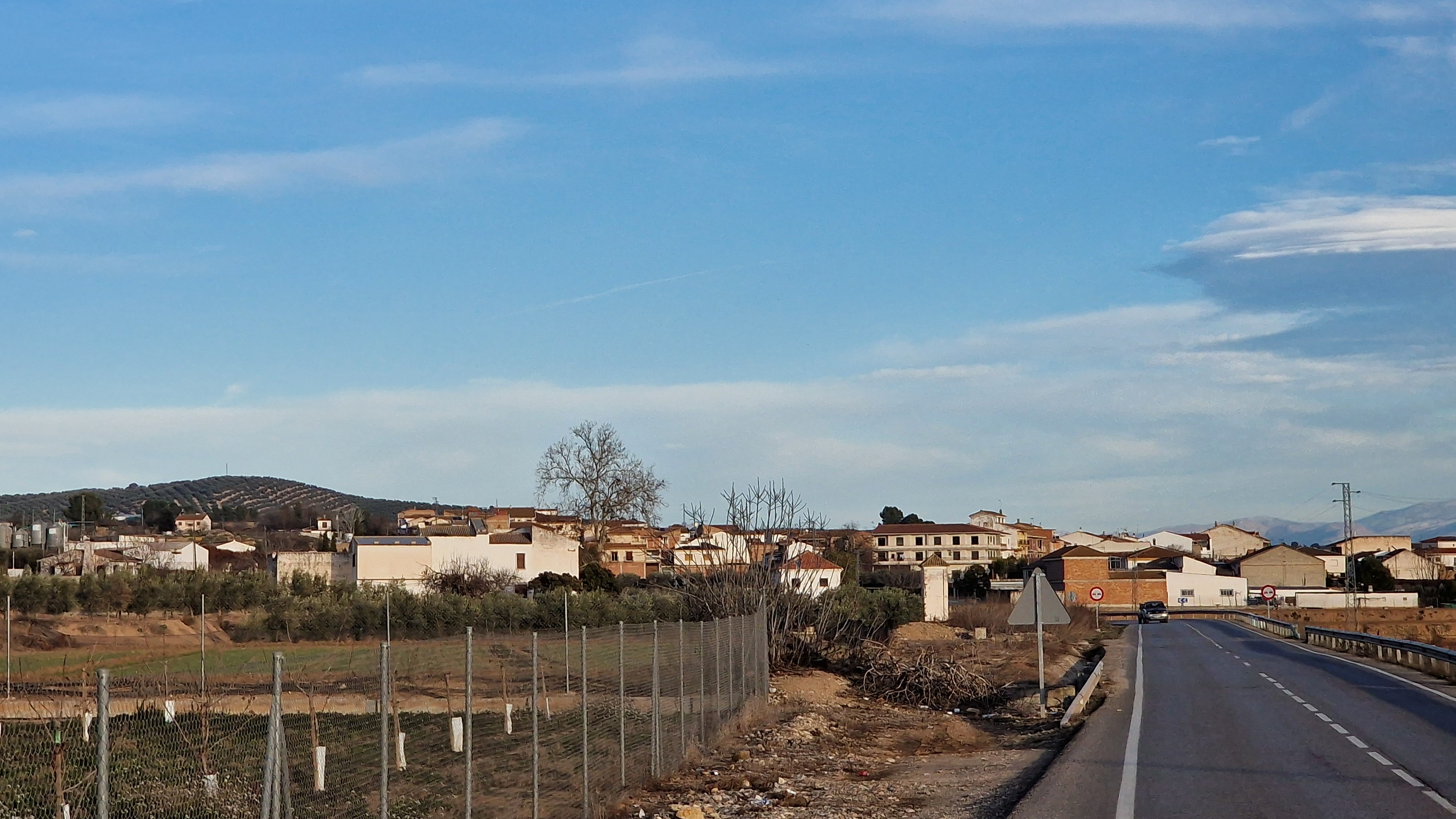

- Flag Coat of arms

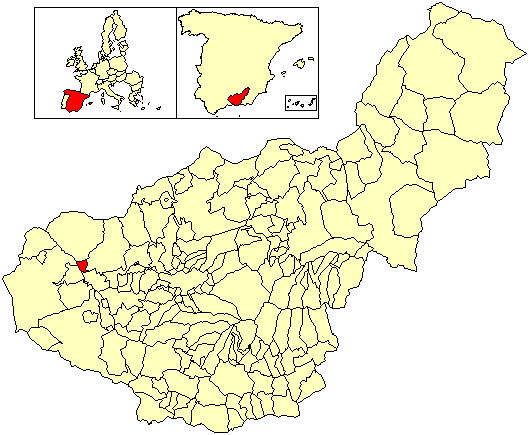

- Location of Villanueva Mesía in Spain
- Coordinates: 37°12′51″N 4°00′40″W
- Country: Spain
- Autonomous community: Andalusia
- Province: Granada

Area
  - Total: 11.18 km^{2} (4.32 sq mi)
- Elevation: 489 m (1,604 ft)

Population (2025-01-01)
  - Total: 1,965
  - Density: 175.8/km^{2} (455.2/sq mi)
- Time zone: UTC+1 (CET)
  - Summer (DST): UTC+2 (CEST)
- Website: www.villanuevamesia.com

Villanueva Mesía is a municipality in the province of Granada, Spain. In 2010, it had a population of 2,158 inhabitants.

== See also ==
- List of municipalities in Granada
