= Omar Fraile =

Spanish cyclist

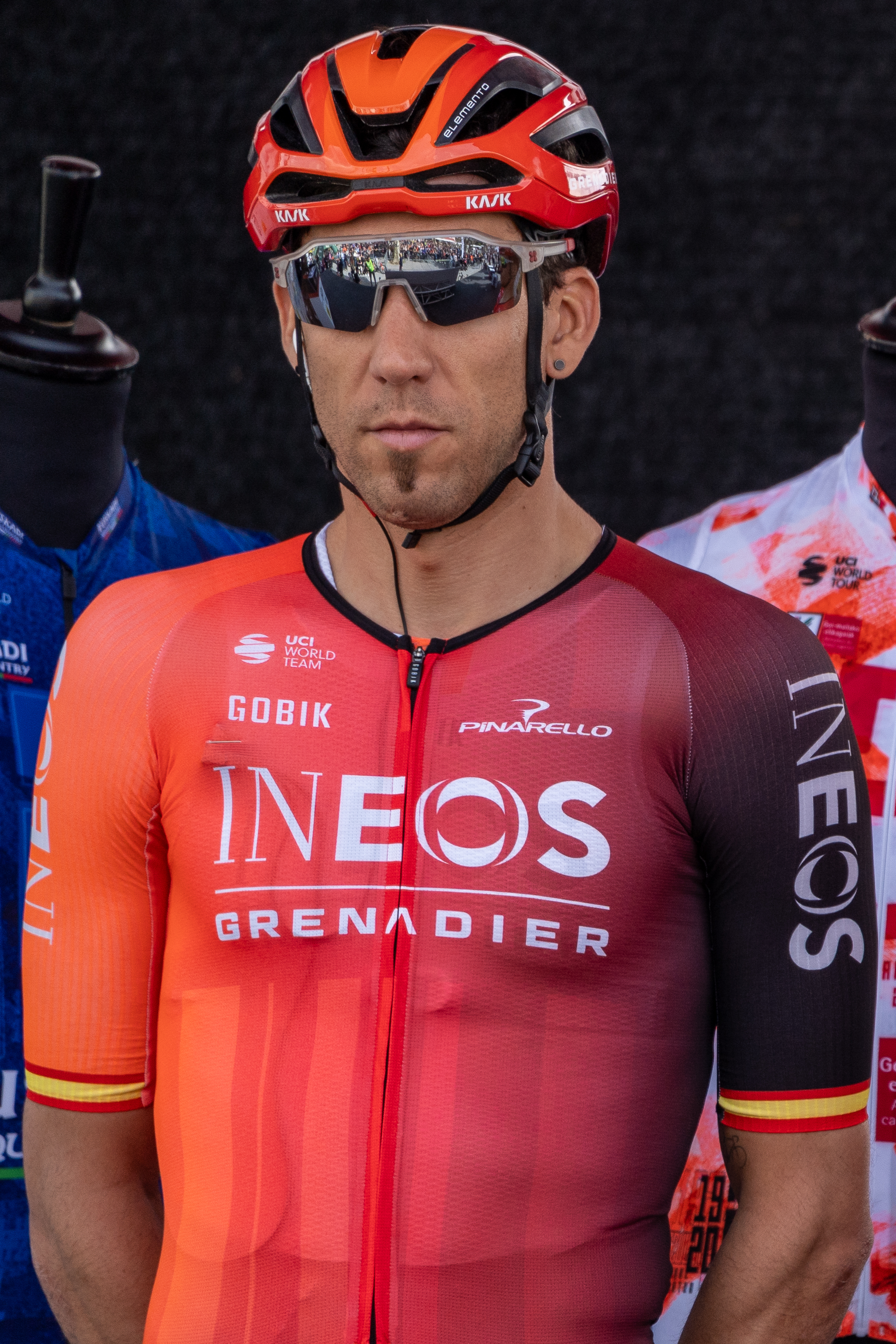
- Fraile in Espelette, 2024 Itzulia.

Personal information
- Full name: Omar Fraile Matarranza
- Born: 17 July 1990 (age 36) Santurtzi, Spain
- Height: 1.83 m (6 ft 0 in)
- Weight: 72 kg (159 lb; 11 st 5 lb)

Cycling career
- Sport: Cycling
- Discipline: Road
- Role: Rider
- Rider type: Climber; Breakaway specialist

Professional teams
- 2012: Orbea
- 2013–2015: Caja Rural
- 2016–2017: Team Dimension Data
- 2018–2021: Astana
- 2022–2025: INEOS Grenadiers

Major wins
- Grand Tours Tour de France 1 individual stage (2018) Giro d'Italia 1 individual stage (2017) Vuelta a España Mountains classification (2015, 2016) 1 TTT stage (2019) One-Day Races and Classics National Road Race Championships (2021)

Omar Fraile Matarranza (born 17 July 1990) is a Spanish former professional racing cyclist, who last rode for UCI WorldTeam Netcompany–Ineos. He is a winner of stages in the Tour de France and the Giro d'Italia, and has twice won the Mountains classification in the Vuelta a España.

== Career ==
=== Caja Rural (2013–2015) ===
He rode at the 2014 UCI Road World Championships. On 26 April 2015, Fraile won the Giro dell'Appennino from a small group of riders, outsprinting Stefano Pirazzi and Damiano Cunego. The victory at Giro dell'Appennino was Omar's first professional victory. Later that year, Fraile won Stage 4 at the 4 Jours de Dunkerque. He rode in the 2015 Vuelta a España where he won the mountains classification, by making well-timed breakaways in order to gain points for the classification.

=== Team Dimension Data (2016–2017) ===
==== 2016 ====
Subsequently, Team Dimension Data announced that Fraile would join them for the 2016 season. He was named in the start list for the 2016 Giro d'Italia, but abandoned the race on Stage 5. However, before abandoning, Fraile managed to wear the Mountains Jersey on stage 3 after collecting enough points on stage 2. Fraile then won the Mountains classification at the Vuelta a Burgos. He then rode the Vuelta a España where he won the Mountains classification once again.

==== 2017 ====
One week before riding the Giro d'Italia, Fraile finished 2nd on the final stage of the Tour de Yorkshire, and therefore 2nd in the general classification. On stage 11 of the Giro d'Italia, Fraile made the breakaway and ended up winning the stage in a sprint between his breakaway companions. He also managed to pick up points for the Mountains classification which made him wear the Mountains Jersey for 2 days, after eventually losing it later in the race.

=== Astana (2018–2021) ===
==== 2018 ====
At the Paris-Nice, Fraile finished 2nd on the final stage behind David de la Cruz in the sprint. However a month later he took revenge by winning stage 5 at the Tour of the Basque Country. At the end of April, Fraile won the bunch sprint on stage 1 at the Tour de Romandie. Fraile finished 3rd at Spanish National Road Race Championships.

In July 2018, he was named in the start list for the 2018 Tour de France. He went on to win stage 14 of the race. Fraile was placed 57th on the final general classification of the Tour de France 2018.

On 4 August 2018, Fraile competed in Clásica de San Sebastián and was placed 24th; 52 seconds behind winner Julian Alaphilippe.

== Major results ==
2011
3rd Time trial, National Under-23 Road Championships
2013
10th Grand Prix de Plumelec-Morbihan
2015 (2 pro wins)
1st Giro dell'Appennino
Vuelta a España

1st Mountains classification
Combativity award Stages 3 & 9

1st Mountains classification, Tour of the Basque Country
1st Stage 4 Four Days of Dunkirk
4th Classic Loire Atlantique
10th Overall Vuelta a Asturias
2016
Vuelta a España

1st Mountains classification
Combativity award Stage 6

1st Mountains classification, Vuelta a Burgos
7th Gran Premio di Lugano
Giro d'Italia

Held after Stage 2

2017 (1)
Giro d'Italia

1st Stage 11
Held after Stages 12–13

2nd Overall Tour de Yorkshire
Combativity award Stage 12 Vuelta a España
2018 (3)
1st Stage 14 Tour de France
1st Stage 1 Tour de Romandie
1st Stage 5 Tour of the Basque Country
3rd Road race, National Road Championships
Combativity award Stage 17 Vuelta a España
2019
1st Stage 1 (TTT) Vuelta a España
5th Overall Vuelta a Murcia
2020
1st Mountains classification, Vuelta a Murcia
2021 (1)
1st Road race, National Road Championships
9th GP Miguel Induráin
2022
3rd Overall Tour of Britain
10th Overall CRO Race
2023 (1)
1st Stage 5 Vuelta a Andalucía

=== Grand Tour general classification results timeline ===
Grand Tour	2015	2016	2017	2018	2019	2020	2021	2022	2023
Giro d'Italia	—	DNF	65	—	—	—	—	—	—
Tour de France	—	—	—	57	71	60	57	—	60
Vuelta a España	88	69	DNF	63	79	64	DNF	—	115

Legend
—	Did not compete
DNF	Did not finish
