= Pasmem Gór Świętokrzyskich =

Polish road cycling race

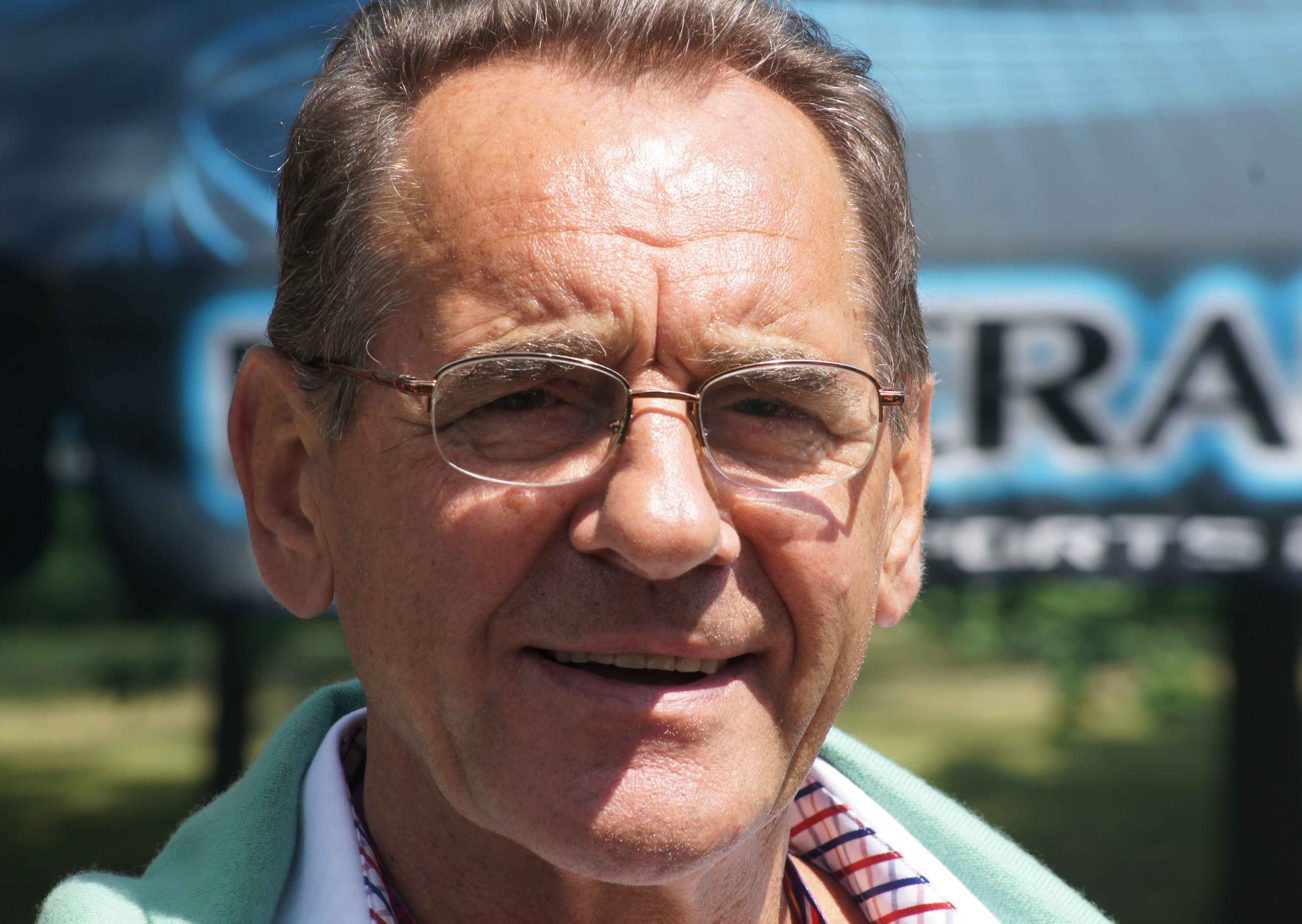
Ryszard Szurkowski won the race in 1973

Pasmem Gór Świętokrzyskich was a road cycling race held in the Świętokrzyskie Mountains in Poland during the years 1951–1956, 1959–1963, 1967–1985, 1987–1989, and 2002–2003.

The race, first won by Józef Kapiak in 1951, played a significant role in developing and popularizing cycling in the Świętokrzyskie region. Held 35 times, it often served as a key test of form for Poland's national team cyclists before major international events, such as the World Championships and Summer Olympics. The race attracted generations of Poland's top cyclists, including Stanisław Królak, Ryszard Szurkowski, Stanisław Szozda, Tadeusz Mytnik, Czesław Lang, and Zbigniew Piątek.

== Race history ==
=== Single-stage race (1951–1972) ===
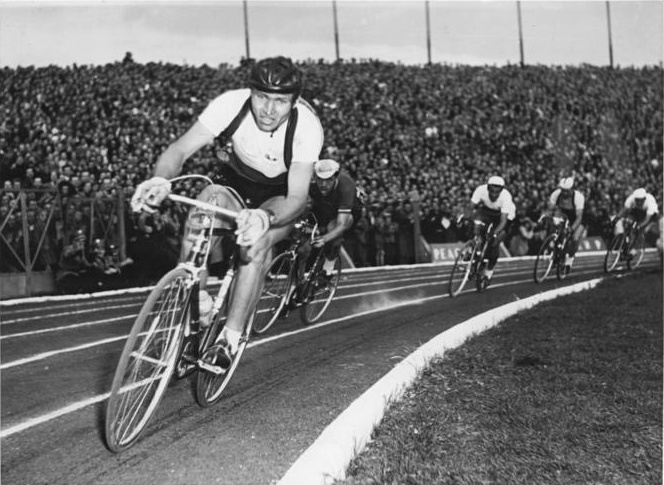
Stanisław Królak won the race in 1952 and 1955

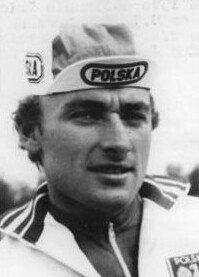
Czesław Lang, winner in 1977

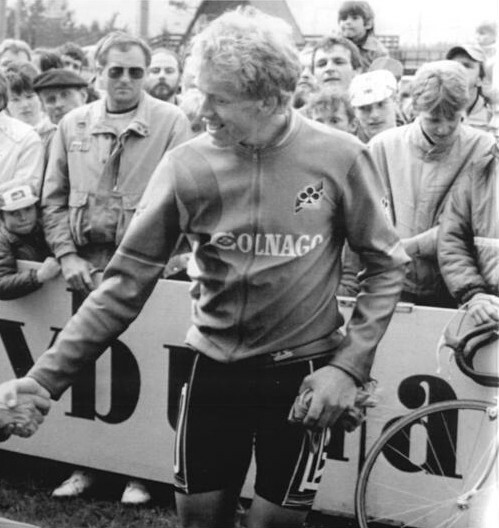
Zenon Jaskuła, second place in 1987

The inaugural race, originally called the Nationwide Świętokrzyskie Cycling Race, took place on 19 August 1951. The route started in Kielce, passed through Końskie and Skarżysko-Kamienna, and finished at the Kielce stadium on Ściegiennego Street. Józef Kapiak, representing Legia Warszawa, won by gaining an advantage near Zagnańsk. Three hours later, cyclists competed in an Australian pursuit race at the Gwardia Kielce stadium, watched by approximately 3,000 spectators.

In 1952, Stanisław Królak, early in his career, won, narrowly beating his cousin Henryk Łasak. Harsh weather and a poorly prepared early section meant only 17 of 53 cyclists finished. Królak won again in 1955, but in 1956, he lost a sprint finish to Marian Więckowski. From 1959 to 1962, the race primarily featured regional cyclists, with Franciszek Kosela and Edward Błaszczyk of SHL Kielce each winning twice.

By 1963, the race regained national prominence and grew in prestige, becoming a critical preparation event for international competitions. On 28 August 1972, the 17th edition saw Zbigniew Krzeszowiec of Piast Gliwice win, though five others recorded the same time.

=== New format (1973–1989) ===
In 1973, the race was renamed the Grand Prix of the Świętokrzyskie Mountains and expanded to four stages, including a time trial and a criterium.

The first race in the new format began with a surprise: Mieczysław Klimczyk of Świt Wolica won the time trial, beating Ryszard Szurkowski by 44 seconds. Szurkowski won the next two stages and, despite being outpaced by Stanisław Szozda in the final stage, claimed overall victory, receiving a porcelain trophy from Ćmielów.

In 1974, the final stage saw multiple breakaways. A decisive move at 88 km involved seven riders, with ten more joining by 120 km. Andrzej Kaczmarek won the stage, followed by Henryk Woźniak and Marian Nawrot, all with the same time. Stanisław Boniecki won the overall classification, beating Jan Baćkowski by seven seconds.

Subsequent years saw victories by prominent Polish cyclists, including Tadeusz Mytnik (1975), Czesław Lang (1977), and Jan Jankiewicz (1980). The race typically comprised three or four stages, with the Kielce criterium being the most spectacular. In 1979, cyclists competed on the newly built Tor Kielce in Miedziana Góra, with Jarosław Grodzki winning the first stage held there.

In 1981, the race reverted to a single stage on Tor Kielce (104 km, 25 laps). Harsh weather and a demanding course meant only 14 of 64 starters finished. Zbigniew Szczepkowski won, outsprinting Czesław Lang and Adam Zagajewski.

In 1982, Sławomir Lewandowski secured victory with a solo breakaway in the final stage. Five pursuing riders took a wrong turn on Lenin Street, losing nearly a minute. The leader after three stages, Lechosław Michalak, finished later, dropping to second overall. Other winners in the 1980s included Andrzej Serediuk (1984), Andrzej Mierzejewski (1985, 1987), and Jacek Bodyk (1989).

=== Race revival (2002–2003) ===
In 2002, Świętokrzyskie Cycling Association president Marian Forma revived the race. Zbigniew Piątek won, narrowly beating Kazimierz Stafiej after both chose not to sprint, but judges awarded Piątek the victory by centimeters. In 2003, the 35th edition was won by Wojciech Pawłak, who outsprinted breakaway companions, including Łukasz Bodnar.

== Results ==
Edition	Date	1st place	2nd place	3rd place	Source
I	19 August 1951	Józef Kapiak; Legia Warszawa	Wacław Wójcik; Legia Warszawa	Bolesław Łazarczyk; Victoria Częstochowa	
II	12 October 1952	Stanisław Królak; Legia Warszawa	Henryk Łasak; Gwardia Warszawa	Jerzy Liszkiewicz; Gwardia Łódź	
III	2 August 1953	Władysław Klabiński; Gwardia Warszawa	Witold Preczyński; Społem Łódź	Wacław Wójcik; Legia Warszawa	
IV	1 August 1954	Władysław Klabiński; Gwardia Warszawa	Stanisław Szostak; Włókniarz Łódź	Lech Pijanowski; Legia Warszawa	
V	10 July 1955	Stanisław Królak; Legia Warszawa	Tadeusz Waliszewski; Legia Warszawa	Jerzy Jankowski; Gwardia Łódź	
VI	17 June 1956	Marian Więckowski; Legia Warszawa	Stanisław Królak; Legia Warszawa	Henryk Komuniewski; Gwardia Łódź	
VII	13 September 1959	Franciszek Kosela; SHL Kielce	Ryszard Zapała; Piast Chęciny	Edward Bodzioch; SHL Kielce	
VIII	9 October 1960	Franciszek Kosela; SHL Kielce	Edward Błaszczyk; SHL Kielce	Mieczysław Mela; SHL Kielce	
IX	17 September 1961	Edward Błaszczyk; SHL Kielce	Rajmund Zieliński; Czarni Radom	Jerzy Linde; Czarni Radom	
X	16 September 1962	Edward Błaszczyk; SHL Kielce	Włodzimierz Gwardyś; SHL Kielce	Jan Kuchta; Piast Chęciny	
XI	15 September 1963	Jan Chtiej; Społem Łódź	Jan Kudra; Społem Łódź	Józef Beker; LZS Wrocław	
XII	29 May 1967	Kazimierz Jasiński; Legia Warszawa	Wojciech Otrembski; Budowlani Łódź	Wojciech Kowalski; Włókniarz Łódź	
XIII	30 September 1968	Marian Forma; SHL Kielce	Jerzy Kowalczuk; Sarmata Warszawa	Andrzej Imosa; LZS Busko	
XIV	17 August 1969	Sławomir Rubin; Gwardia Łódź	Ryszard Polkowski; Flota Gdynia	Andrzej Jakubowski; Legia Warszawa	
XV	24 August 1970	Andrzej Jakubowski; Bug Wyszków	Jerzy Linde; Społem Łódź	Szczepan Kaszowski; Cracovia	
XVI	16 August 1971	Kazimierz Jasiński; Broń Radom	Julian Różalski; Broń Radom	Tymoteusz Macyszyn; Dolmel Wrocław	
XVII	28 August 1972	Zbigniew Krzeszowiec; Piast Gliwice	Stanisław Demel; Polonia Warszawa	Jarosław Bek; Społem Łódź	
XVIII	17–19 August 1973	Ryszard Szurkowski; Dolmel Wrocław	Stanisław Dymek; Wisłoka Dębica	Zbigniew Bielski; Lechia Gdańsk	
XIX	10–12 August 1974	Stanisław Boniecki; Agromel Toruń	Jan Baćkowski; Korona Kielce	Andrzej Pierzyński; LZS Pawlikowice	
XX	20–22 June 1975	Tadeusz Mytnik; Flota Gdynia	Ryszard Szurkowski; Dolmel Wrocław	Stanisław Szozda; Ziemia Opolska	
XXI	1–3 June 1976	Florian Andrzejewski; Wielkopolska Poznań	Stanisław Kirpsza; Gwardia Białystok	Mieczysław Nowicki; Włókniarz Łódź	
XXII	17–19 June 1977	Czesław Lang; Legia Warszawa	Józef Kołopajło; Flota Gdynia	Tadeusz Mytnik; Flota Gdynia	
XXIII	16–17 June 1978	Adam Jagła; Bobrek Bytom	Witold Plutecki; Legia Warszawa	Ryszard Szurkowski; Dolmel Wrocław	
XXIV	14–15 June 1979	Waldemar Okrutnik; Moto Jelcz Oława	Jarosław Grodzki; Tramwajarz Łódź	Józef Pytowski; Górnik Sosnowiec	
XXV	22–24 June 1980	Jan Jankiewicz; MRLKS Wrocław	Tadeusz Wojtas; Neptun Gdańsk	Lechosław Michalak; Legia Warszawa	
XXVI	15 August 1981	Zbigniew Szczepkowski; Legia Warszawa	Czesław Lang; Legia Warszawa	Adam Zagajewski; Legia Warszawa	
XXVII	25–27 June 1982	Sławomir Lewandowski; Legia Warszawa	Lechosław Michalak; Legia Warszawa	Jan Muzyka; Plon Rzeszów	
XXVIII	16–17 July 1983	Sławomir Lewandowski; Mazowsze Teresin	Grzegorz Banaszek; Sarmata Warszawa	Zbigniew Szymański; Stomil Poznań	
XXIX	21–22 June 1984	Andrzej Serediuk; Moto Jelcz Oława	Andrzej Mierzejewski; Agromel Toruń	Józef Szpakowski; Victoria Rybnik	
XXX	16–17 June 1985	Andrzej Mierzejewski; Agromel Toruń	Lech Piasecki; Orlęta Gorzów	Mieczysław Korycki; Agrosudety Jelenia Góra	
XXXI	14–16 August 1987	Andrzej Mierzejewski; Agromel Toruń	Zenon Jaskuła; Orlęta Gorzów	Andrzej Sypytkowski; Krupiński Suszec	
XXXII	1–3 July 1988	Radosław Romanik; Górnik Wałbrzych	Jerzy Chądzyński; Chrobry Głogów	Andrzej Półkośnik; Polonez Warszawa	
XXXIII	7–9 July 1989	Jacek Bodyk; Górnik Polkowice	Jerzy Woźniak; Górnik Polkowice	Mirosław Kucharski; Bobrek Bytom	
XXXIV	22 June 2002	Zbigniew Piątek; Mróz	Kazimierz Stafiej; Mróz	Przemysław Mikołajczyk; Servisco Koop	
XXXV	20 June 2003	Wojciech Pawłak; Mikomax Browar Staropolski	Przemysław Mikołajczyk; Servisco Koop	Jarosław Rębiewski; Mikomax Browar Staropolski	

== Bibliography ==
- Michniak, M.; Pawłowski, A. (2000). Cykliści z Gór Świętokrzyskich [Cyclists from the Świętokrzyskie Mountains] (in Polish). Kielce: Słowo Kibica. ISBN 83-909812-3-8.
