= Henryk Charucki =

Polish cyclist (born 1955)

Personal information
- Full name: Henryk Stanisław Charucki
- Born: 2 December 1955 (age 70) Ostrów Mazowiecka, Poland

Cycling career
- Sport: Cycling
- Discipline: Road
- Role: Rider

Amateur teams
- LZS Zambrów
- Dolmel Wrocław
- Flota Gdynia
- EC Pont Audemer
- VC Auxerre
- UC Aulnat-Sayat

Major wins
- Tour de Pologne (1979); National mountain championship (1979)

Henryk Stanisław Charucki (born 2 December 1955) is a Polish former road racing cyclist who rode for Flota Gdynia and Dolmel Wrocław. He won the 1979 Tour de Pologne and the Polish national mountain championship the same year, and later spent eleven seasons racing for French clubs. After retiring he became an entrepreneur in the bicycle industry.

== Cycling career ==
=== Early years ===
Charucki grew up in the village of Paproć Duża in the Podlasie region, one of eight children. He took up cycling in 1970 at LZS Zambrów. In 1974 he moved to Wrocław and joined Dolmel Wrocław, while also working at the city's Dolmel electrical machinery plant. He trained under Mieczysław Żelaznowski, and his teammates at the time included Ryszard Szurkowski, Jan Brzeźny and Jan Faltyn.

=== Military service and Flota Gdynia ===
He did his military service, which began in the mid-1970s, with the military sports club Flota Gdynia, so he was able to keep training. In 1977, riding for Flota, he won the silver medal in the 100 km team time trial at the Polish national championships. After completing his service he returned to Dolmel.

=== 1978 season ===
In 1978 he won the bronze medal in the 100 km team time trial at the Polish national championships with Dolmel Wrocław.

That year he also won the Tour de Mexico, also known as the Race of the Two Californias. He took the final stage after a solo breakaway.

Two months later he was leading the general classification of the Tour de Pologne, but crashed on the descent from the Krowiarki pass, abandoned the race and needed surgery. Despite this he started the road race at the World Championships in August, finishing 47th while working for his national teammates. Krzysztof Sujka took the silver medal in that race.

=== 1979 Tour de Pologne victory ===
1979 was the most successful season of his career. Without a call-up to the national team, he started the 36th Tour de Pologne with the Metalowiec team, made up mostly of Dolmel Wrocław riders and managed by coach Wojciech Walkiewicz. He took the overall lead after a breakaway with Roman Cieślak and held it to the finish of the race, which was held from 6 to 15 July over 1,335 km. The same season he won the Polish national mountain championship.

=== Racing in France ===
In 1982 he moved to France, where he rode first for the Normandy club EC Pont Audemer, then for the Didier Louis team and OC Briouze. His first major success there was the overall win at the Deux Jours de Liberté Dimanche stage race, where he also won all three stages. He then received an offer from the professional Mercier team, but the transfer fell through because of conditions set by the Polish Cycling Federation.

In spring 1983 he rode the Critérium du Dauphiné Libéré in a team of Polish cyclists racing in France, alongside Ryszard Szurkowski, Tadeusz Mytnik and Jan Brzeźny, among others. On the stage over Mont Ventoux he reached the summit in ninth place and finished the stage 15th. He was the only member of the Polish team to complete the race. He also rode the Tour de l'Avenir.

In the mid-1980s he moved to VC Auxerre in Burgundy, and in 1990 to UC Aulnat-Sayat in Auvergne, where besides racing he acted as an unofficial coach and sports director. He brought Mieczysław Karłowicz and Jacek Bodyk to the club. Karłowicz won the 1990 Tour de Pologne, and Bodyk finished fifth at the amateur World Championships. From 1991 the team was sponsored by Groupama.

He retired in 1992 after 22 years of racing, eleven of them in France. By his own account he won more than 200 races.

=== Major results ===
1977
2nd Team time trial, National Road Championships
1978
1st Overall Tour de Mexico (Race of the Two Californias)

1st Final stage

3rd Team time trial, National Road Championships
1979
1st Overall Tour de Pologne
1st Mountain race, National Road Championships
1982
1st Overall Deux Jours de Liberté Dimanche

1st Stages 1, 2 & 3

Other victories in France (1982–1992)
1st Overall Trois Jours de Vauzelles

1st Stages 1 & 2

1st Overall Tour de la Côte Roannaise
1st Tour de la Creuse
1st Polysénonaise (four times)
1st Trophée de la Manche
1st Boucles de la CSGV Sézanne–Épernay
1st Prix Souvenir Misac (Channes)
1st Prix de Châteauneuf-Val-de-Bargis (twice)
1st Grand Prix de Villeneuve-sur-Yonne
1st Tour du Canton de Courpière
1st Prix de Blangy-sur-Bresle
1st Prix de Saint-Léger-des-Vignes
1st Classique des Écureuils (Montceau)
1st Souvenir Barat (Puy-de-Dôme)

== Business career ==
In 1992 he founded Harfa-Harryson. It was a civil-law partnership at first, and from 1997 a sole proprietorship. The company distributes cycling equipment from brands including Mavic, Michelin and SRAM.

In 2007 he opened the Lower Silesian Bicycle Centre (Dolnośląskie Centrum Rowerowe) on Robotnicza Street in Wrocław. It covers about 1,500 m², including about 1,000 m² of retail space, and when it opened it was one of the largest facilities of its kind in Poland.

The company has sponsored Polish cycling teams including Mróz, Intel Action, CCC Polsat and Legia-Felt, and provides Mavic neutral service at the Tour de Pologne. Charucki has served as the race's deputy sports director.

In 2015 he and Czesław Lang founded Lang & Charucki, the official Polish distributor of the Italian bicycle brand Colnago. Through this business they sponsored the professional team Domin Sport and the women's team UKS Mróz Colnago Jedynka Kórnik. Together with Lang he also presented Pope Francis with a road bicycle funded by Ernesto Colnago. Charucki also set up the amateur team Colnago Harfa Harryson Team.

== Other activities ==
Since 2001 he has organised an annual cycling pilgrimage to Jasna Góra in Częstochowa. In 2023 he was an expert commentator on the 80th Tour de Pologne for Polish Radio Programme III. He races in amateur masters events.

== Honours ==
- Bronze Cross of Merit (2010)
- Silver Cross of Merit (2021)

== Personal life ==
He is the father of Paweł Charucki (born 1988), who is also a cyclist.
