= 2003 Tour de Pologne =

Cycling race

Race details
- Dates: 8–14 September 2003
- Stages: 8
- Distance: 1,233 km (766.2 mi)
- Winning time: 29h 46' 11"

Results
	Winner	Cezary Zamana (POL)
	Second	Andrea Noè (ITA)
	Third	Dave Bruylandts (BEL)

The 2003 Tour de Pologne was the 60th edition of the Tour de Pologne cycle race and was held from 8 September to 14 September 2003. The race started in Gdańsk and finished in Karpacz. The race was won by Cezary Zamana.

== General classification ==
Final general classification

Rank	Rider	Time
1	Cezary Zamana (POL)	29h 46' 11"
2	Andrea Noè (ITA)	+ 1' 12"
3	Dave Bruylandts (BEL)	+ 1' 46"
4	Laurent Brochard (FRA)	+ 1' 51"
5	Marek Rutkiewicz (POL)	+ 2' 00"
6	Andrei Zintchenko (RUS)	+ 2' 50"
7	Jon Bru (SPA)	+ 3' 12"
8	Zbigniew Piątek (POL)	+ 3' 19"
9	Tomasz Brożyna (POL)	+ 3' 57"
10	Piotr Przydział (POL)	+ 4' 16"
