= Jacek Mickiewicz =

Polish cyclist

Personal information
- Full name: Jacek Mickiewicz
- Born: 17 April 1970 (age 56) Dzierżoniów, Poland
- Height: 1.72 m (5 ft 8 in)
- Weight: 74 kg (163 lb)

Cycling career
- Sport: Cycling
- Role: Rider
- Rider type: Road

Professional teams
- 1995: Rotan Spiessens–Hot Dog Louis
- 1996–2000: Mróz
- 2001: Atlas-Ambra
- 2002–2003: CCC–Polsat

Jacek Mickiewicz (born 17 April 1970) is a Polish former road racing cyclist. He was professional from 1995 until 2004. Before he was professional, he appeared at the 1992 Summer Olympics, finished 22nd in the road race.

== Palmarès ==
Date	Placing	Event	Competition	Location	Country
1990	3rd place, bronze medalist(s)	National Championship	Road race		Poland
1991	1	Stage 1	Peace Race	Hradec Králové	Czechoslovakia
1992	1	Stage 1b	Milk Race	Bideford	United Kingdom
1993	1	Stage 11	Milk Race	Salford Quays	United Kingdom
1994	1st place, gold medalist(s)	National Championship	Road race		Poland
1994	1	Stage 5	Tour de Pologne	Kielce	Poland
1995	3rd place, bronze medalist(s)	National Championship	Road race		Poland
1995	1	Stage 1a	Bayern Rundfahrt		Germany
1996	1	Stage 7	Course de la Solidarité Olympique		Poland
1996	1	Stage 2	Po Ziem Tour		Poland
1996	1	Stage 4b	Peace Race	Żywiec	Poland
1997	1	Stage 2	Course de la Solidarité Olympique		Poland
1997	1	Stage 8	Course de la Solidarité Olympique		Poland
1997	1	Stage 10	Course de la Solidarité Olympique		Poland
1997	1	Prologue	Peace Race	Magdeburg	Germany
1997	1	Stage 5	Peace Race	Rybnik	Poland
1997	1	Stage 4	Post Danmark Rundt	Odense	Denmark
1998	1	Stage 2	GP Mosqueteiros - Rota do Marquês		Portugal
1998	1	Stage 5	Tour du Vaucluse		France
2000	1		GP Weltour		Poland
2000	1	Stage 3	Kalisz–Konin	Kalisz	Poland
2000	1	General Classification	Kalisz–Konin		Poland
2000	1	Stage 1	Tour of Japan	Osaka	Japan
2000	1	Stage 2	Baltyk–Karkonosze Tour		Poland
2000	1	Stage 5B	Baltyk–Karkonosze Tour	Świdnica	Poland
2000	1	Stage 6	Baltyk–Karkonosze Tour	Jelenia Góra	Poland
2000	1		Memoriał Henryka Łasaka		Poland
2001	1	Stage 5	Baltyk Karkonosze Tour	Sieraków	Poland
2001	1	Stage 1	Inter. Course 4 Asy Fiata Autopoland	Sławków	Poland
2002	1	Stage 1	Szlakiem Grodów Piastowskich	Chojnów	Poland
2002	1	Stage 3	Szlakiem Grodów Piastowskich	Lubin	Poland
2002	1	Stage 7	Peace Race	Hoyerswerda	Germany
2002	1		GP Ostrowca Swietokrzyskiego		Poland
2002	1	Stage 2	Course de la Solidarité Olympique	Stalowa Wola	Poland
2002	1	Stage 4	Course de la Solidarité Olympique	Wadowice	Poland
2002	1	Stage 1	Dookoła Mazowsza	Płock	Poland
2002	1	Stage 5	Dookoła Mazowsza	Warsaw	Poland
2002	1	General Classification	Dookoła Mazowsza		Poland
