= Tour de Pologne =

Cycling road race held in Poland

Race details
- Date: August
- Region: Poland
- English name: Tour of Poland
- Local name(s): Wyścig Dookoła Polski (in Polish)
- Discipline: Road race
- Competition: UCI World Tour
- Type: Race stage
- Organiser: Lang Team Sp. z o.o.
- Race director: Czesław Lang
- Web site: tourdepologne.pl

History
- First edition: 1928; 98 years ago
- Editions: 82 (as of 2025)
- First winner: Feliks Więcek (POL)
- Most wins: Dariusz Baranowski (POL); Andrzej Mierzejewski (POL); Marian Więckowski (POL) (3 wins each)
- Most recent: Marco Brenner (GER)

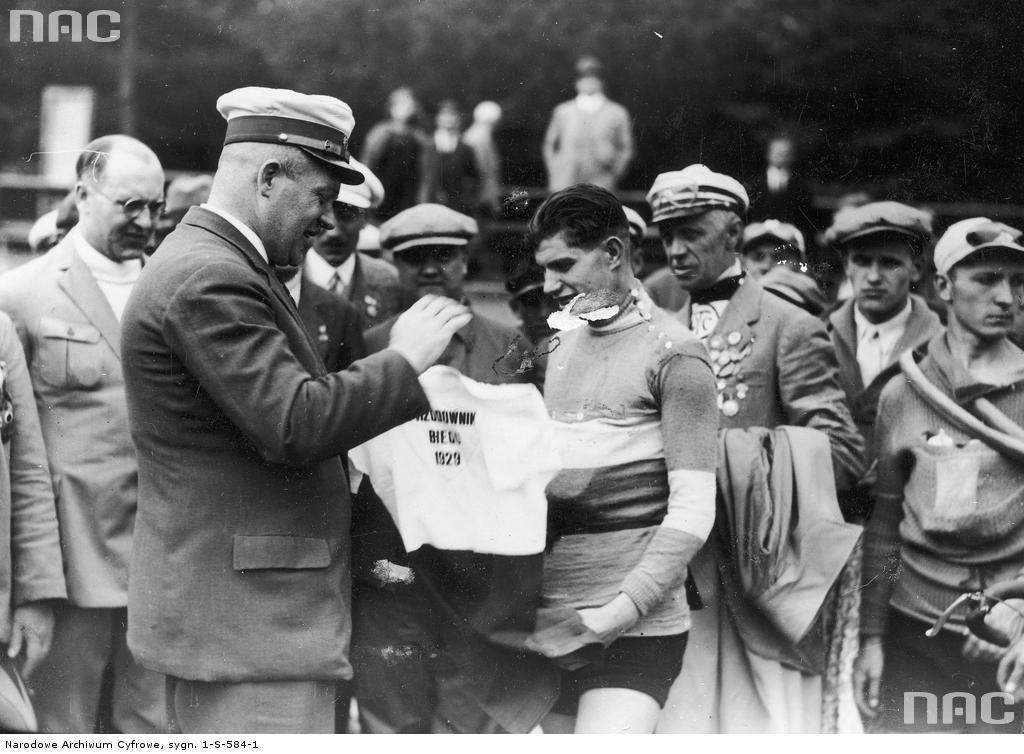
Józef Stefański wins the first stage of the 1929 edition of the race.

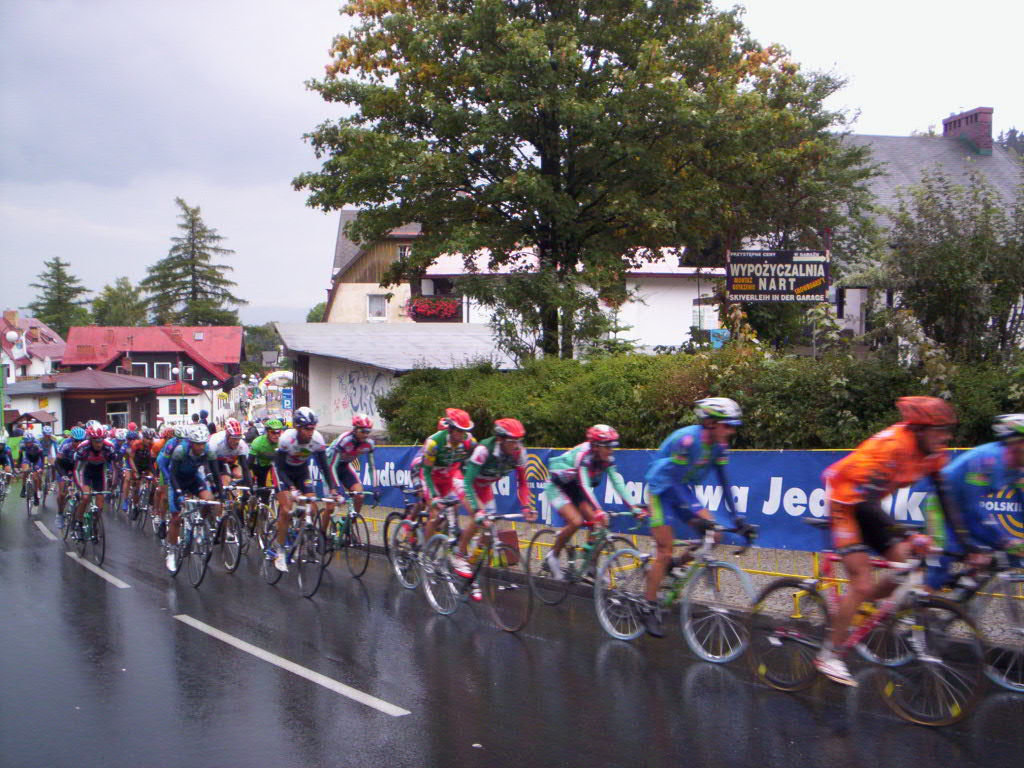
The peloton in the 2004 Tour de Pologne.

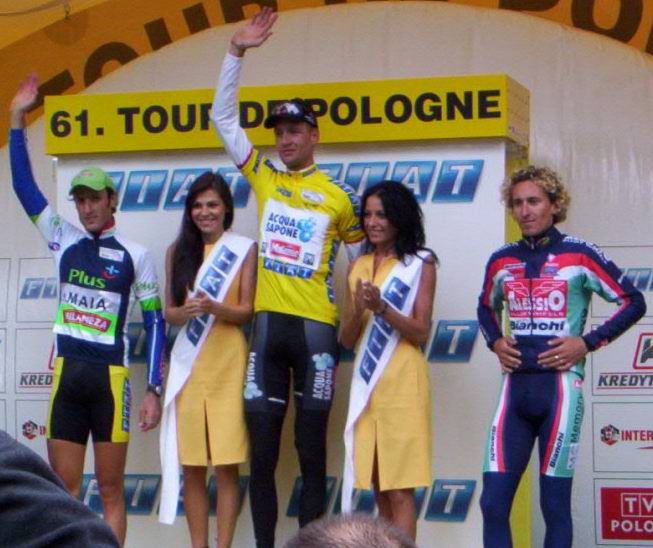
Ondřej Sosenka was the winner of the race in 2004.

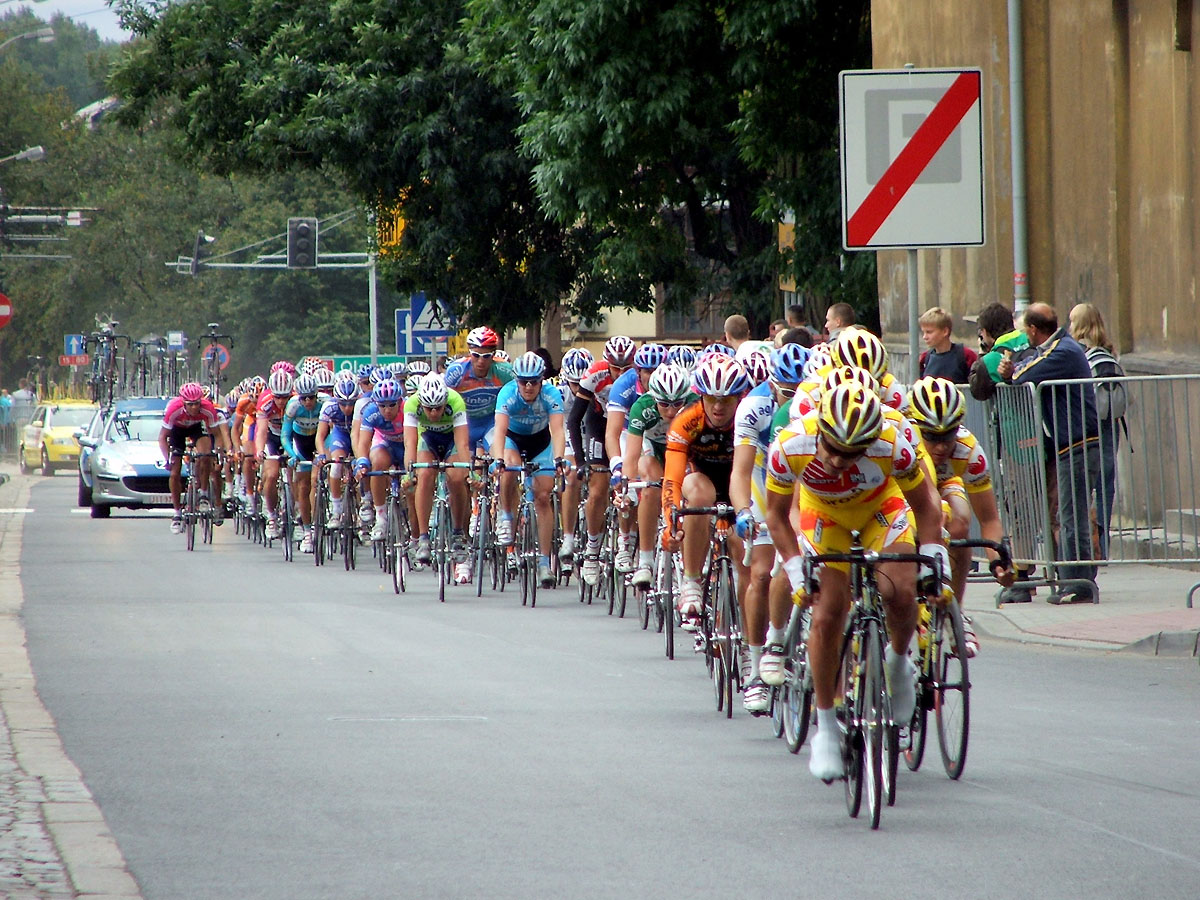
2006 Tour de Pologne in Toruń

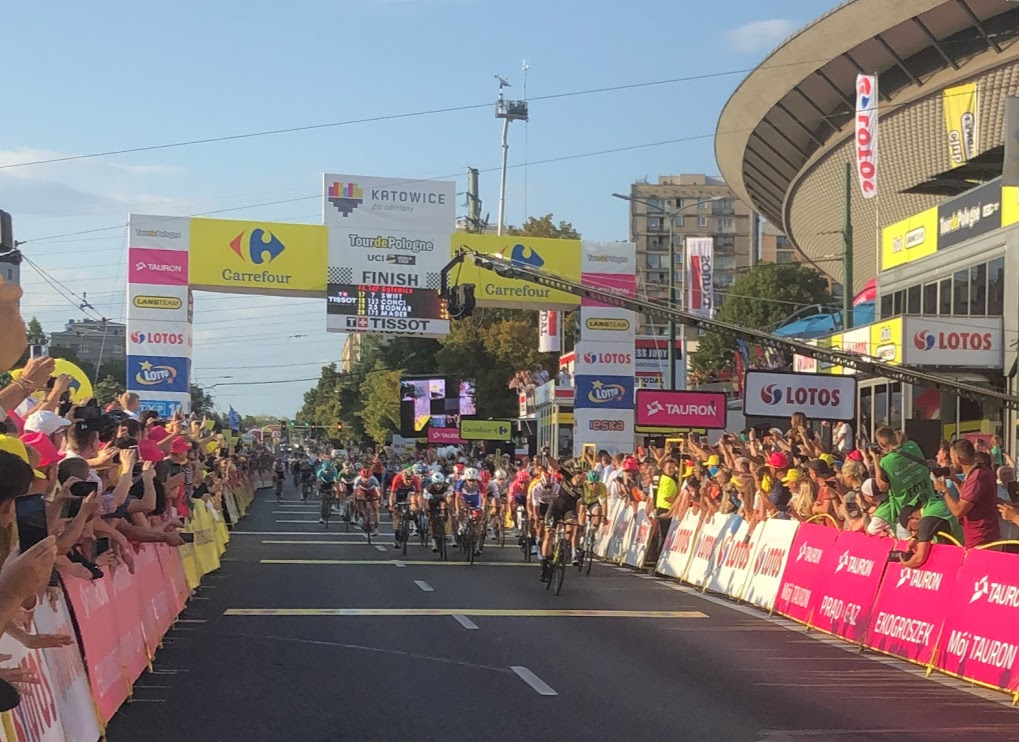
2019 Tour de Pologne stage 2 peloton finish in Katowice.

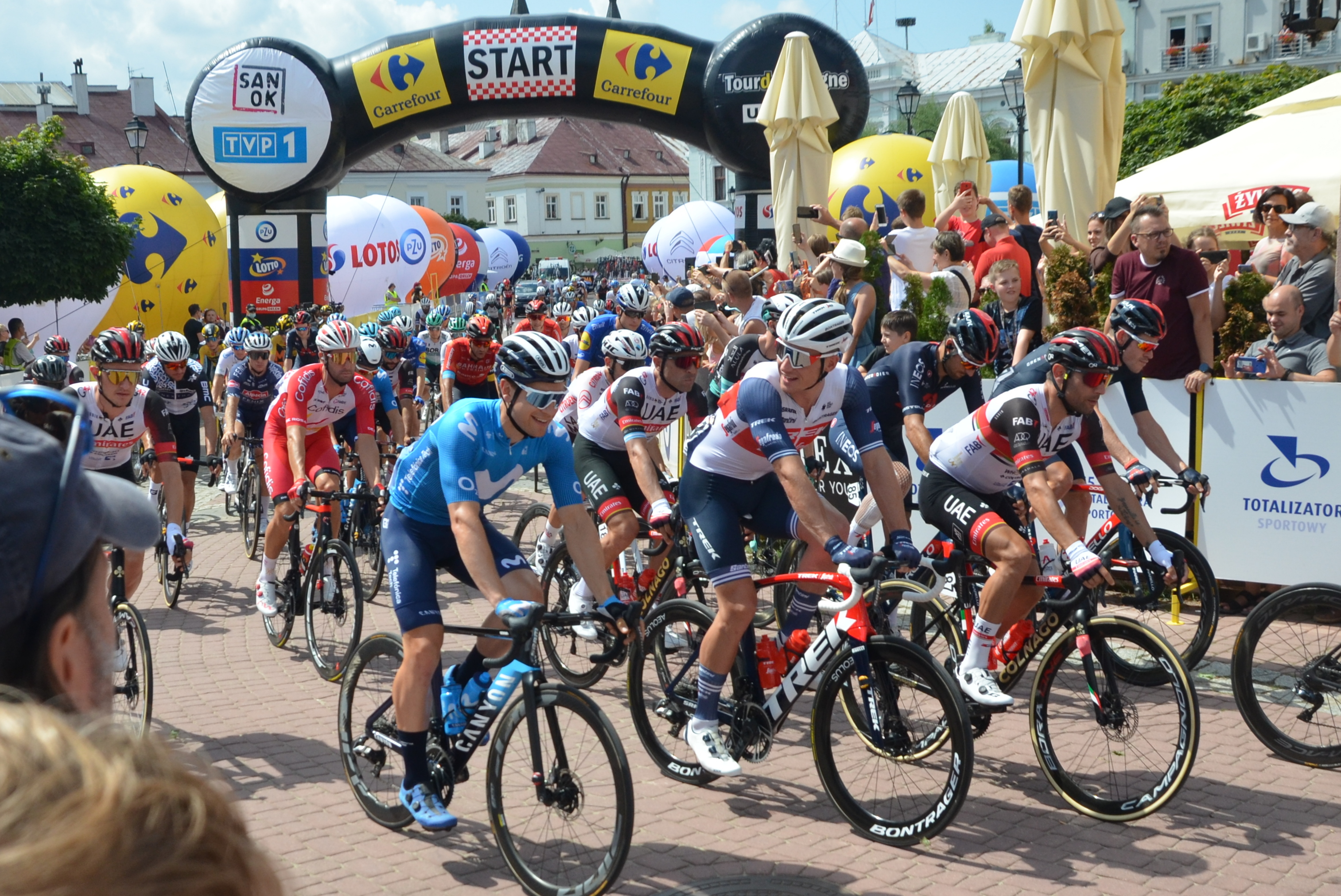
Start of the third stage of 2021 Tour de Pologne

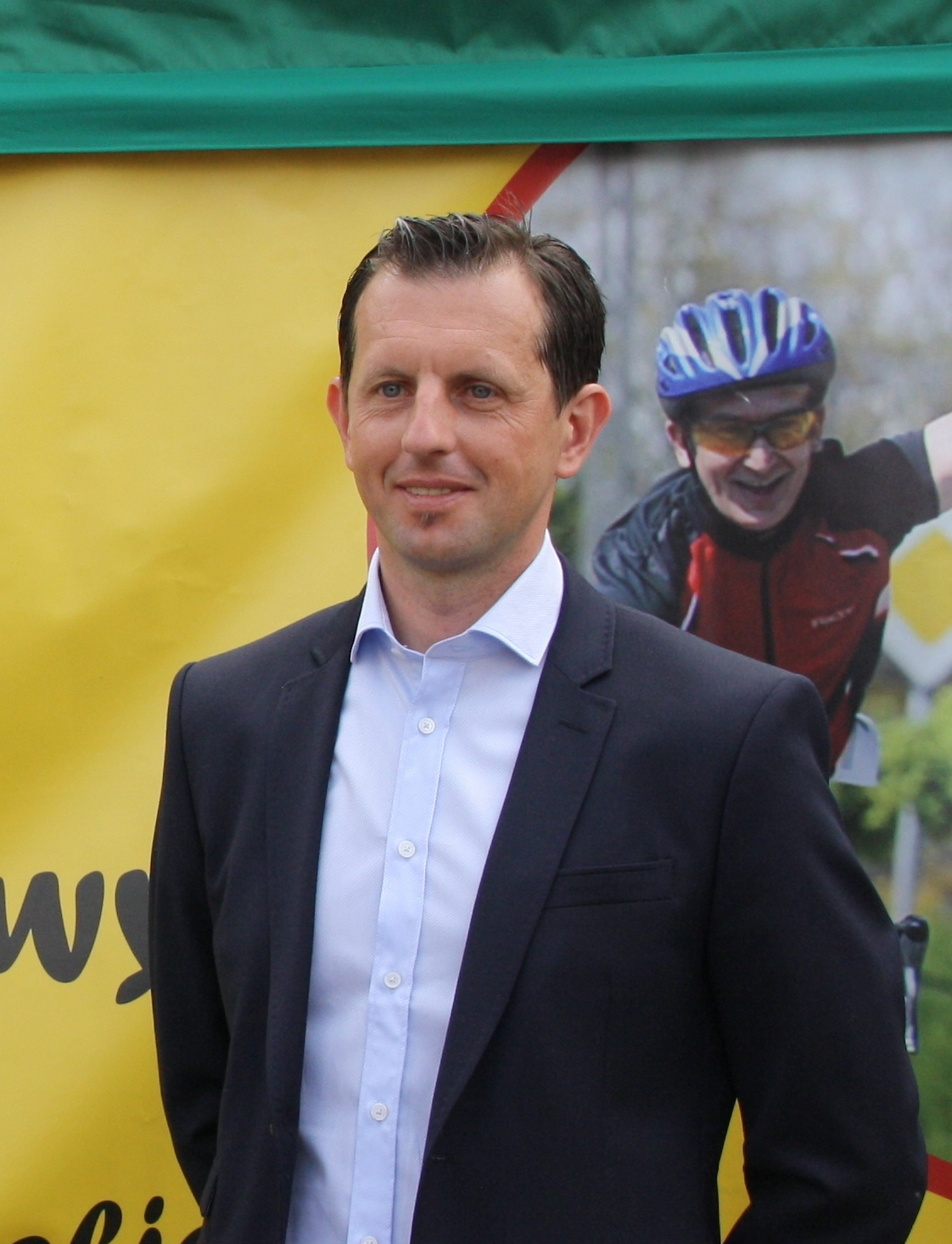
Dariusz Baranowski, the winner of the 1991, 1992, 1993 TdP.

The Tour de Pologne (Polish: Wyścig Dookoła Polski, lit. 'Tour of Poland'), officially abbreviated TdP, is an annual, professional men's multiple-stage bicycle race primarily held in Poland. It consists of seven or eight stages and is usually around 1,200 km in length. The race was first held in 1928 and is considered the oldest and most important bicycle race in Poland.

The race was held periodically until 1952, after which it became an annual event. Until early 1993 the race was open to amateur cyclists only and most of its winners came from Poland. Since 2009, the race has been taking place between July and August.

The international cycling association, the Union Cycliste Internationale (UCI), made TdP part of the UCI ProTour in 2005, and part of the UCI World Tour, cycling's highest level of professional men's races, in 2009. In 2016, the three-stage women's competition Tour de Pologne kobiet was organised one day after the last men's stage. Three riders, Dariusz Baranowski, Andrzej Mierzejewski and Marian Więckowski, share the record of most wins, with three each.

== History ==
=== Beginnings ===
The initial concept of the TdP's multi-stage format was modelled after the popular Tour de France. The proposal for organizing the event was submitted jointly by the Warsaw Cycling Society and the Przegląd Sportowy sports newspaper published in Kraków. Thanks to their initiative, a Wyścig Dookoła Polski (Race Around Poland, the original name of the TdP) was held in the summer of 1928. The historic first edition of the race took place from 7–11 September 1928. 71 cyclists rode almost 1,500 km — the winner was Felix Więcek from the Bydgoszcz Cycling Club. The honorary patrons of the race included President of the Second Polish Republic Ignacy Mościcki while the President of the Honorary Committee was Marshal Józef Piłsudski.

Until the outbreak of World War II, the TdP took place four times, two of which — in the years 1937 and 1939 - were won by the "Tiger of the Roads" - Bolesław Napierała.

The early races differed significantly from today's. The stages were much longer (often a distance of 300 km), and riders repeatedly caught flat tires on stone-chipped roads, and made stops at local restaurants.

=== Post-WWII ===
After the war, the idea of a cycling competition around Poland was reborn. In 1947, thanks to the cooperation of the Polish Cycling Association, the publishing house Czytelnik and a group of journalists, the race was reactivated after an 8-year break. The winner after just four stages and only 606 km (the shortest route in the history of the TdP) was Stanislaw Grzelak. Until 1993 it was not possible for the organizers of TdP to achieve an adequate rank for their event. This was due to the official stance of the authorities and the favoring of a different cycling event — the Peace Race. Noteworthy moments from that time period: triumphs of foreign cyclists — Francesco Locatelli (1949), Roger Diercken (1960), José Viejo (1972) and André Delcroix (from 1974); the longest edition of the race - 2,311 km and 13 stages (in 1953); and the hat-trick of victories of Marian Wieckowski (1954–56), matched only by Dariusz Baranowski (1991–93).

In 1993, Czesław Lang, the 1980 Summer Olympics cycling road race silver medalist and the winner of the 1980 TdP, took over the function of TdP Director. Thanks to his persistent efforts, the TdP is now a UCI World Ranking event.

In 1997, during the UCI congress in San Sebastian, TdP advanced to the professional category of 2.4, and was classified as a "National Race" (the first of its kind in Central and Eastern European countries).

At the 1999 UCI Road World Championships, the UCI Technical Commission promoted the race to Class 2.3. On 12 October 2001 the Tour was promoted to category 2.2.

=== Since 2005 ===
In the 2005 decision of the UCI, the TdP was included in the elite of cycling events — the UCI ProTour. The composition of the sample were three Grand Tours: Giro d'Italia, Tour de France, Vuelta a España, classic World Cup, staged races 2.HC category (i.e. Paris–Nice, Tour de Suisse), the classics 1.HC (i.e. La Flèche Wallonne - The Walloon Arrow) and the TdP, which was advanced by 2 categories to 2HC.

Over several years, the activities of Polish precursor of professional law enforcement — Czeslaw Lang, Kolarska amateur event, known in the mainly communist countries, has been transformed into a well-organized professional race. This resulted in the groups with the top names of professional cycling such as Danilo Di Luca, Laurent Brochard, Óscar Freire, Romāns Vainšteins, Viatcheslav Ekimov, Gianluca Bortolami, Erik Dekker, Stefano Garzelli, Vincenzo Nibali and Jonas Vingegaard as well as cyclists like Mark Cavendish, Cadel Evans, Fabio Aru, Baden Cooke, Daniele Bennati, Richard Carapaz, Matej Mohorič, Simon Yates, Jakob Fuglsang, Dan Martin, Thibaut Pinot, Bradley Wiggins, André Greipel, Remco Evenepoel, Geraint Thomas and Peter Sagan.

Tour de Pologne received the title of "Best Sport Event of the Year" on six occasions in the Przegląd Sportowy polls in 1995, 1996, 2004, 2008, 2011 and 2015.

The Czech Republic, Italy and Slovakia are the three countries which have hosted stages or part of a stage of Tour de Pologne: (Český Těšín in 2010, 2011 and 2012, Trentino South Tirol in 2013 and Štrbské Pleso in 2014).

=== Women's race ===
In 2024, the second edition of the women's race, officially known as Tour de Pologne Women, was held between 28 and 30 June. In 2026, the women's race joined the UCI ProSeries.

== List of winners ==
Year	Country	Rider	Team
1928	Poland	Feliks Więcek	Bydgoski Klub Kolarzy
1929	Poland	Józef Stefański	AKS Warszawa
1933	Poland	Jerzy Lipiński	Skoda Warszawa
1937	Poland	Bolesław Napierała	Polska II
1939	Poland	Bolesław Napierała	Syrena Warszawa
1947	Poland	Stanisław Grzelak	Tramwajarz Łódź
1948	Poland	Wacław Wójcik	Polska I
1949	Italy	Francesco Locatelli	Italy
1952	Poland	Wacław Wójcik	CWKS Warszawa
1953	Poland	Mieczysław Wilczewski	Unia Chorzów
1954	Poland	Marian Więckowski	CWKS Warszawa
1955	Poland	Marian Więckowski	CWKS Warszawa
1956	Poland	Marian Więckowski	CWKS Legia Warszawa
1957	Poland	Henryk Kowalski	Lechia Gdańsk
1958	Poland	Bogusław Fornalczyk	LZS Myszków
1959	Poland	Wiesław Podobas	CWKS Warszawa
1960	Belgium	Roger Diercken	Belgium
1961	Poland	Henryk Kowalski	Lechia Gdańsk
1962	Poland	Jan Kudra	Społem Łódź
1963	Poland	Stanisław Gazda	Start Bielsko
1964	Poland	Rajmund Zieliński	LZS Nowogard
1965	Poland	Józef Beker	LZS Mokrzeszów
1966	Poland	Józef Gawliczek	LZS II
1967	Poland	Andrzej Bławdzin	LZS Mazowsze
1968	Poland	Jan Kudra	Społem Łódź
1969	Poland	Wojciech Matusiak	Arkonia Szczecin
1970	Poland	Jan Stachura	Unia Oświęcim
1971	Poland	Stanisław Szozda	CWKS Legia Warszawa
1972	Spain	José Luis Viejo	Spain
1973	Poland	Lucjan Lis	Górnik Radzionków
1974	Belgium	André Delcroix	Belgium
1975	Poland	Tadeusz Mytnik	Flota Gdynia
1976	Poland	Janusz Kowalski	Polska
1977	Poland	Lechosław Michalak	Polska II
1978	Poland	Jan Brzeźny	Polska I
1979	Poland	Henryk Charucki	Metalowiec
1980	Poland	Czesław Lang	Polska I
1981	Poland	Jan Brzeźny	Polska I
1982	Poland	Andrzej Mierzejewski	Polska
1983	Poland	Tadeusz Krawczyk	Polska I
1984	Poland	Andrzej Mierzejewski	Polska
1985	Poland	Marek Leśniewski	Polska
1986	Poland	Marek Kulas	Polska
1987	Poland	Zbigniew Piątek	Polska
1988	Poland	Andrzej Mierzejewski	LZS I
1989	Poland	Marek Wrona	JZS Jelcz Oława
1990	Poland	Mieczysław Karłowicz	JZS Jelcz
1991	Poland	Dariusz Baranowski	OZKol Wałbrzych
1992	Poland	Dariusz Baranowski	Soia – Górnik
1993	Poland	Dariusz Baranowski	Pekaes Lang Rover Legia
1994	Italy	Maurizio Fondriest	Lampre Panaria Animex
1995	Poland	Zbigniew Spruch	Lampre Panaria Animex
1996	Russia	Viatcheslav Djavanian	Roslotto ZG
1997	Switzerland	Rolf Järmann	Casino – Géant
1998	Russia	Serguei Ivanov	TVM–Farm Frites
1999	Poland	Tomasz Brożyna	Mróz
2000	Poland	Piotr Przydział	Mat–Ceresit–CCC
2001	Czech Republic	Ondřej Sosenka	Ceresit–CCC–Mat
2002	France	Laurent Brochard	Jean Delatour
2003	Poland	Cezary Zamana	Action Nvidia–Mróz
2004	Czech Republic	Ondřej Sosenka	Acqua & Sapone
2005	Luxembourg	Kim Kirchen	Fassa Bortolo
2006	Germany	Stefan Schumacher	Gerolsteiner
2007	Belgium	Johan Vansummeren	Predictor–Lotto
2008	Germany	Jens Voigt	CSC–Saxo Bank
2009	Italy	Alessandro Ballan	Lampre–NGC
2010	Ireland	Daniel Martin	Garmin–Transitions
2011	Slovakia	Peter Sagan	Liquigas–Cannondale
2012	Italy	Moreno Moser	Liquigas–Cannondale
2013	Netherlands	Pieter Weening	Orica–GreenEDGE
2014	Poland	Rafał Majka	Tinkoff–Saxo
2015	Spain	Ion Izagirre	Movistar Team
2016	Belgium	Tim Wellens	Lotto–Soudal
2017	Belgium	Dylan Teuns	BMC Racing Team
2018	Poland	Michał Kwiatkowski	Team Sky
2019	Russia	Pavel Sivakov	Team INEOS
2020	Belgium	Remco Evenepoel	Deceuninck–Quick-Step
2021	Portugal	João Almeida	Deceuninck–Quick-Step
2022	Great Britain	Ethan Hayter	INEOS Grenadiers
2023	Slovenia	Matej Mohorič	Team Bahrain Victorious
2024	Denmark	Jonas Vingegaard	Visma–Lease a Bike
2025	United States	Brandon McNulty	UAE Team Emirates XRG
2026	Germany	Marco Brenner	Tudor Pro Cycling Team

=== Multiple winners ===
Wins	Rider	Editions
3	Dariusz Baranowski (POL)	1991, 1992, 1993
3	Andrzej Mierzejewski (POL)	1982, 1984, 1988
3	Marian Więckowski (POL)	1954, 1955, 1956
2	Jan Brzeźny (POL)	1978, 1981
2	Henryk Kowalski (POL)	1957, 1961
2	Jan Kudra (POL)	1962, 1968
2	Bolesław Napierała (POL)	1937, 1939
2	Ondřej Sosenka (CZE)	2001, 2004
2	Wacław Wójcik (POL)	1948, 1952

=== Winners by country ===
#	Country	Victories
1	Poland	52
2	Belgium	6
3	Italy	4
4	Russia	3
4	Germany	3
5	Czech Republic	2
5	Spain	2
8	Denmark	1
8	France	1
8	Ireland	1
8	Luxembourg	1
8	Netherlands	1
8	Portugal	1
8	Slovakia	1
8	Slovenia	1
8	Switzerland	1
8	United Kingdom	1
8	United States	1

== Accidents ==
Throughout the history of Tour de Pologne, two fatal accidents involving riders participating in the race occurred:

- On 18 September 1967, 22-year-old Polish rider Jan Myszak (Legia Warsaw) died as a result of head injury sustained in an accident on 17 September during the third stage of the race from Przemyśl to Sanok.
- On 5 August 2019, 22-year-old Belgian rider Bjorg Lambrecht (Lotto–Soudal) crashed 60 miles from the end of the third stage of the race from Chorzów to Zabrze. He was taken by helicopter to hospital but died later on the same day during a surgery as a result of internal hemorrhage.

== See also ==
- Sport in Poland
- Tour of Małopolska
- UCI WorldTour
- Road cycling
- Bicycling terminology
