= 1996 Tour de Pologne =

Cycling race

Race details
- Dates: 8–15 September 1996
- Stages: 8
- Distance: 1,185 km (736.3 mi)
- Winning time: 28h 03' 46"

Results
	Winner	Viatscheslav Djavanin (RUS)
	Second	Maurizio Fondriest (ITA)
	Third	Andrea Noè (ITA)

The 1996 Tour de Pologne was the 53rd edition of the Tour de Pologne cycle race and was held from 8 September to 15 September 1996. The race started in Szczecin and finished in Bełchatów. The race was won by Viatscheslav Djavanin.

== General classification ==
Final general classification

Rank	Rider	Time
1	Viatcheslav Djavanian (RUS)	28h 03' 46"
2	Maurizio Fondriest (ITA)	+ 2' 44"
3	Andrea Noè (ITA)	+ 5' 18"
4	Valentino Fois (ITA)	+ 5' 49"
5	Youri Sourkov (KAZ)	+ 7' 50"
6	Filippo Simeoni (ITA)	+ 8' 09"
7	Vassili Davidenko (RUS)	+ 8' 23"
8	Darren Baker (USA)	+ 11' 01"
9	Raimondas Rumšas (LTU)	+ 15' 35"
10	Zbigniew Piątek (POL)	+ 17' 08"
