= Cezary Zamana =

Polish cyclist

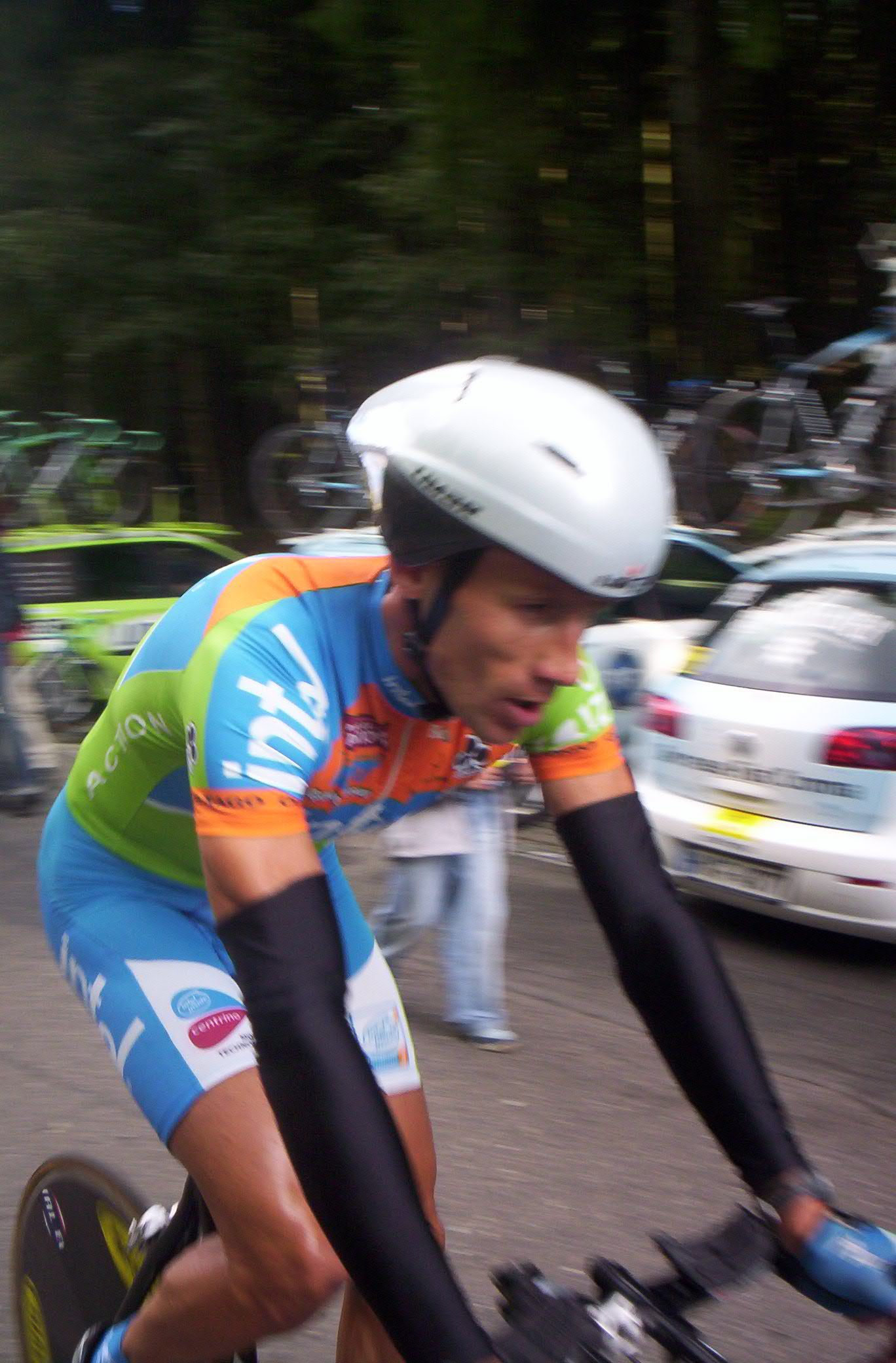
- Zamana, Karpacz 2005

Personal information
- Full name: Cezary Zamana
- Born: 14 November 1967 (age 58) Ełk, Poland
- Height: 1.85 m (6 ft 1 in)
- Weight: 74 kg (163 lb)

Cycling career
- Sport: Cycling
- Discipline: Road
- Role: Rider

Professional teams
- 1990: Ochsner
- 1991–1993: Subaru–Montgomery
- 1994: Kelme–Avianca–Gios
- 1995: Motorola
- 1996–1999: Mróz
- 2000–2002: Mat–Ceresit–CCC
- 2003: Action Nvidia–Mróz
- 2004: Chocolade Jacques–Wincor Nixdorf
- 2005–2006: Action–Ati

Cezary Zamana (born 14 November 1967) is a former professional road racing cyclist from Ełk, Poland.

== Major results ==
1989
5th Overall Tour de Pologne
1992
1st Overall Cascade Cycling Classic

1st Stage 3

1st Stage 5 West Virginia Mountain Classic
4th Japan Cup Cycle Road Race
8th Overall Tour of Britain
9th Giro dell'Emilia
1993
1st Stage 7 Critérium du Dauphiné Libéré
3rd Overall Tour d'Armorique
9th Overall Tour de Pologne

1st Stages 6 & 11

9th Overall Grand Prix du Midi Libre
1994
4th Overall Tour d'Armorique
9th A Travers le Morbihan
1996
1st Stage 3 Bałtyk–Karkonosze Tour
5th Overall Tour de Normandie

1st Stage 3

8th Cholet-Pays de Loire
1997
3rd Overall Tour de Normandie

1st Stage 2

3rd Zellik–Galmaarden
10th Overall Tour of Japan
1998
1st Overall Commonwealth Bank Classic
1st Andrzej Kaczyny Memorial
3rd Road race, National Road Championships
3rd First Union Invitational
5th Overall Tour de Slovénie
5th Overall Course de Solidarność et des Champions Olympiques
7th Route Adélie
10th Overall Tour of Japan
1999
1st Road race, National Road Championships
1st Memoriał Henryka Łasaka
1st Stages 1, 6 & 7 Vuelta a Argentina
2nd Overall Tour de Pologne
7th Overall Course de Solidarność et des Champions Olympiques
2000
1st Overall Szlakiem Walk Majora Hubala
4th Memoriał Henryka Łasaka
9th Overall Tour de Pologne
2001
4th Road race, National Road Championships
2002
1st Memoriał Henryka Łasaka
2nd GP Midtbank
3rd Overall Inter. Race 4 Asy Fiata Autopoland

1st Stage 4

5th Overall Szlakiem Walk Majora Hubala
6th Overall Tour de Pologne

1st Stage 6

8th GP Industria Artigianato e Commercio Carnaghese
9th GP Fred Mengoni
2003
1st Overall Tour de Pologne

1st Stage 6

1st Overall Tour of Małopolska

1st Stages 1 & 2

1st Memoriał Henryka Łasaka
2nd Overall Okolo Slovenska

1st Stage 2

5th Road race, National Road Championships
7th Overall Szlakiem Walk Majora Hubala
2004
3rd Grand Prix d'Isbergues
9th Overall Tour de Pologne
2005
1st Majowy Wyścig Klasyczny-Lublin
1st Overall Tour of Małopolska
1st Overall Hessen Rundfahrt
2nd Overall Bałtyk–Karkonosze Tour
4th Overall Szlakiem Grodów Piastowskich

1st Mountains classification

4th Ronde van Drenthe
4th Druivenkoers Overijse
7th Rund um den Henninger Turm
7th Overall Giro del Capo
9th Puchar Ministra Obrony Narodowej
10th Overall Rheinland-Pfalz Rundfahrt
2006
8th Druivenkoers Overijse
10th Overall Tour of Małopolska
