= Wilderness Trail Bikes =

American bicycle component company

- Trade name: WTB
- Type: Private
- Industry: Bicycle components
- Founded: 1982; 44 years ago in Mill Valley, California, U.S.
- Founders: Steve Potts, Charlie Cunningham, Mark Slate
- Headquarters: Marin County, California, U.S.
- Key people: Patrick Seidler (president)
- Products: Bicycle tires, saddles, rims, wheels, grips, accessories
- Website: www.wtb.com

Wilderness Trail Bikes (usually shortened to WTB) is a privately owned bicycle components company headquartered in Marin County, California, United States. Founded in 1982 in Mill Valley, California, it originally specialized in components for mountain bikes and today supplies bicycle manufacturers and retailers worldwide with bicycle tires, saddles, rims, wheels, grips, and accessories.

== History ==
=== Origins ===
Marin County is widely regarded as a birthplace of the mountain bike, which developed there in the late 1970s and early 1980s. Steve Potts was building bicycle frames in Mill Valley by 1980, and Charlie Cunningham, in nearby Fairfax, had been building mountain bikes with heat-treated aluminum frames since 1979, using components such as roller-cam brakes and custom hubs designed specifically for off-road use. Potts, Cunningham, and Mark Slate collaborated informally from around 1980 on small-scale component production.

=== Founding and licensing era ===
Potts, Cunningham, and Slate founded Wilderness Trail Bikes in 1982 to produce and market components for the growing sport of mountain biking. The company's own account additionally credits Lance Wyeth as a founder. From the late 1980s, Patrick Seidler became involved with WTB, which licensed company-developed technology to mainstream manufacturers. Licensed designs included tire patterns produced by Specialized Bicycle Components, the Blackburn B-52 water-bottle cage, frame geometry for Trek's 1987 mountain-bike line, and the Grease Guard lubrication system used in SunTour's XC Pro component group.

In 2002, Cunningham and Potts left the company, leaving Slate as the sole remaining original founder.

== Products and technology ==
=== Tires ===
In 1999, WTB introduced the NanoRaptor, which is widely credited as the first 29-inch mountain-bike tire; it was displayed at the Interbike trade show that year. Around 2011, WTB introduced TCS (Tubeless Compatible System), a tubeless rim-and-tire system designed to meet ETRTO dimensional standards. WTB describes TCS as the first sealant-based tubeless system to receive Mavic's UST certification.

=== Saddles and the Fit Right System ===
WTB's saddle range includes models such as the Volt, Silverado, Rocket, Solano, and Gravelier. In 2019, the company introduced the Fit Right System, a free saddle-selection tool that recommends a saddle width and padding level based on a rider's measurements and riding position; it was launched at Eurobike alongside updated saddle graphics and materials. In 2026, WTB overhauled the system to also account for body mechanics, riding style, and ride duration. The company's saddle development has been led by designer Sean Madsen, who modernized longstanding models such as the Volt and Silverado, introduced newer models including the Solano and Gravelier, and was the driving force behind the Fit Right redesign.

=== Original equipment ===
In addition to aftermarket sales, WTB supplies components as original equipment on complete bicycles, and its saddles and tires have been widely specified by bicycle brands. Historically, OEM customers have included Trek, GT Bicycles, Cannondale, and Marin Bikes.

== Leadership and advocacy ==
Patrick Seidler, who became involved with WTB in the late 1980s, serves as the company's president and part-owner. He is active in bicycle advocacy and has served on the board of the advocacy organization PeopleForBikes. In 1997, Seidler and colleague Susie Weaver founded WTB-TAM (originally Transportation Alternatives for Marin), a sister 501(c)(3) non-profit that advocates for bicycle and pedestrian infrastructure in Marin County. In 2025, Seidler received a Lifetime Achievement Award from PeopleForBikes for his advocacy work, which the organization credited with helping inspire Safe Routes to School and securing more than US$250 million in funding for bicycle projects in Marin County.
