= 1999 Tour de Pologne =

Cycling race

Race details
- Dates: 6–12 September 1999
- Stages: 7
- Distance: 1,164 km (723.3 mi)
- Winning time: 27h 52' 53"

Results
	Winner	Tomasz Brożyna (POL)
	Second	Cezary Zamana (POL)
	Third	Jens Voigt (GER)

The 1999 Tour de Pologne was the 56th edition of the Tour de Pologne cycle race and was held from 6 September to 12 September 1999. The race started in Elbląg and finished in Karpacz. The race was won by Tomasz Brożyna.

== General classification ==
Final general classification

Rank	Rider	Time
1	Tomasz Brożyna (POL)	27h 52' 53"
2	Cezary Zamana (POL)	+ 29"
3	Jens Voigt (GER)	+ 30"
4	Raimondas Rumšas (LTU)	+ 3' 05"
5	Piotr Wadecki (POL)	+ 3' 56"
6	Isidro Nozal (ESP)	+ 4' 27"
7	Christophe Moreau (FRA)	+ 4' 35"
8	Bart Voskamp (NED)	+ 5' 26"
9	Denis Leproux (FRA)	+ 5' 54"
10	Zbigniew Piątek (POL)	+ 6' 31"
