= Więcek =

Więcek is a Polish surname. Notable people include:

- Feliks Więcek (1904–1978), Polish cyclist
- Maksymilian Więcek (1920–2006), Polish ice hockey player
- Margaret Wiecek, Polish-American operations researcher
- Miroslav Wiecek (1931–1997), Czech footballer
- Piotr Więcek (born 1990), Polish racing driver
