= Rotan Spiessens–Hot Dog Louis =

Belgian cycling team (1995)

Team information
- UCI code: ROA
- Registered: Belgium
- Founded: 1995
- Disbanded: 1995
- Discipline: Road
- Status: Div I
- Bicycles: Carrera

Key personnel
- General manager: Jozef de Wachter
- Team manager: Luc Schuddinck

Team name history
- 1995: Rotan Spiessens–Hot Dog Louis
Rotan Spiessens–Hot Dog Louis jersey
Jersey

Rotan Spiessens–Hot Dog Louis was a Belgian Men's road bicycle racing team that raced the 1995 season, before disbanding the same year.

Belgian cyclist Geert Omloop started his 15-year career with the team.

One of the four wins achieved by the team in their short history was the Polish National Road Race Championships where Andrzej Sypytkowski won. His lead was 32 seconds over Gregorz Rosolinski and a further two seconds back to fellow Rotan rider Jacek Mickiewicz.

== Team roster ==
As of 31 December 1995

Rider	Date of birth
Tomasz Brożyna (POL)	9 September 1970 (aged 25)
Rik Claeys (BEL)	28 February 1967 (aged 28)
Giovanni Cornette (BEL)	27 August 1971 (aged 24)
Danny Daelman (BEL)	23 October 1969 (aged 26)
Christoph De Backer (BEL)	8 December 1973 (aged 22)
Jeanot Deriemaecker (BEL)	1 January 1971 (aged 24)
Danny Dierckx (BEL)	30 August 1968 (aged 27)
Patrick Fontaine (BEL)	2 November 1964 (aged 31)
Brendan Hart (NZL)	9 July 1971 (aged 24)

Rider	Date of birth
Karl Kälin (SUI)	18 January 1965 (aged 30)
Jacek Mickiewicz (POL)	17 April 1970 (aged 25)
Thierry Moeskops (BEL)	12 March 1970 (aged 25)
Geert Omloop (BEL)	12 February 1974 (aged 21)
Søren Petersen (DEN)	7 October 1967 (aged 28)
Jan Poppe (BEL)	11 August 1970 (aged 25)
Sebastian Rudkin (AUS)	1 June 1971 (aged 24)
Andrzej Sypytkowski (POL)	14 October 1963 (aged 32)
Koen Van Hullebusch (BEL)	5 February 1970 (aged 25)

== Major wins ==
1995
Stage 1a Bayern Rundfahrt, Jacek Mickiewicz
Poland National Road Race Championships, Andrzej Sypytkowski
Giro del Lago Maggiore, Karl Kälin
Overall Tour of Małopolska, Tomasz Brożyna

== National champions ==
1995
Poland Road race champion, Andrzej Sypytkowski
