= Tadeusz Krawczyk =

Polish cyclist

Personal information
- Born: 3 June 1959 (age 67) Poznań, Poland

Cycling career
- Sport: Cycling
- Role: Rider

Tadeusz Krawczyk (born 3 June 1959) is a Polish former racing cyclist. He won the Tour de Pologne 1983.
