= Bolesław Napierała =

Polish cyclist

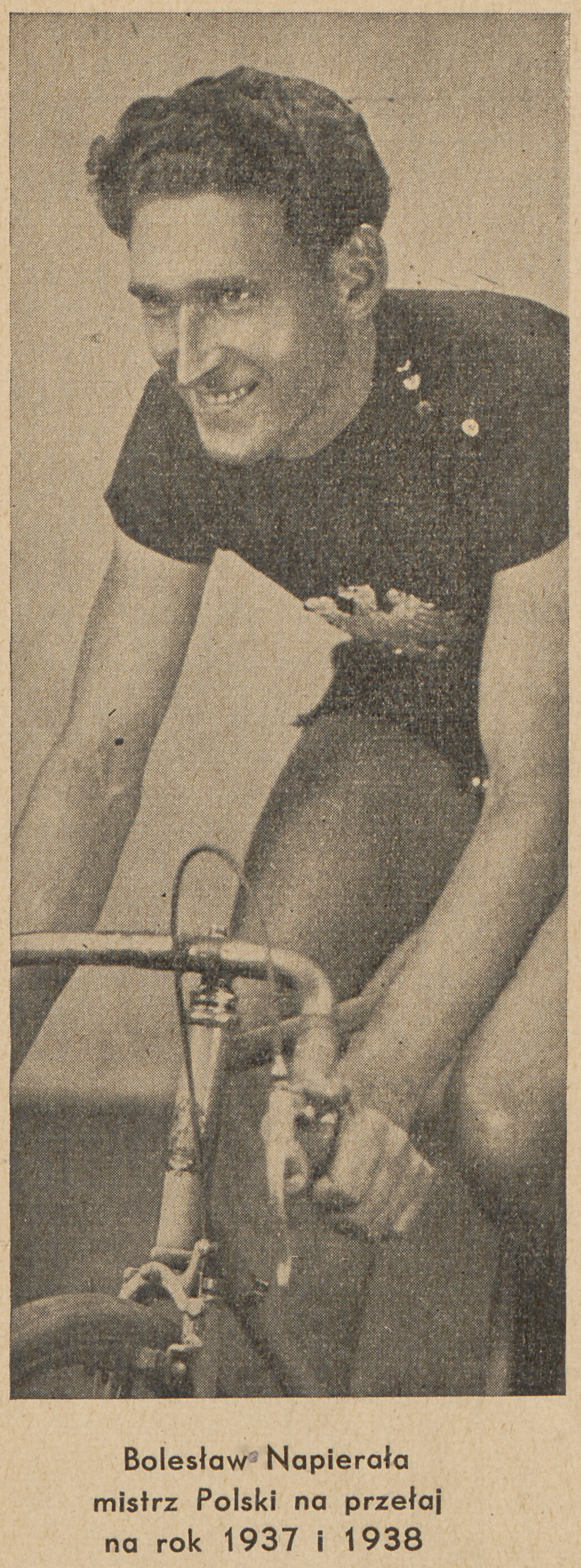

Personal information
- Full name: Bolesław Napierała
- Nickname: Road Tiger
- Born: September 1909 Marten, Germany
- Died: 1976

Cycling career
- Sport: Cycling
- Discipline: Road
- Role: Rider

Major wins
- Tour de Pologne (1937, 1939)

Bolesław Napierała (September 1909 – 1976) was a Polish cycling champion, twice winner of the Tour de Pologne. He was born in Marten, Germany to a family of Polish immigrants. When Poland regained independence in 1918, the family moved back to their homeland. However, after a few years, the Napieralas left Poland again, to Lens in France. It was there that Boleslaw for the first time saw cyclists, during Tour de France. Fascinated by them, he decided to take up cycling himself, helped by his famous neighbor, Luxemburg cyclist Nicolas Frantz.

Napierala, nicknamed Road Tiger, cycled for the teams Fort Bema Warszawa, and Sarmata Warszawa. He twice won Tour de Pologne (1937, 1939), for 15 days was in leader's jersey, and in the 1937 tour, he was a leader from start to finish. In 1939, a month after winning Tour de Pologne, World War II broke out. After the war, Napierala never returned to his late 1930s form.
