= Henryk Kowalski (cyclist) =

Polish cyclist (1933–2021)

Personal information
- Born: 17 July 1933 Turzysk, Poland
- Died: 11 July 2021 (aged 87) Gdańsk, Poland

Cycling career
- Sport: Cycling
- Discipline: Road
- Role: Rider

Professional teams
- 1954–1955: Budowlani Warszawa
- 1956: Stal Stocznia
- 1957–1970: KK Lechia Gdańsk

Major wins
- Stage races Tour de Pologne (1957, 1961) 1 individual stage (1959) Vuelta a Cuba (1967)

Henryk Kowalski (17 July 1933 – 11 July 2021) was a Polish road cyclist.

Born in Turzysk in the Second Polish Republic Kowalski will have been forced to move westwards after World War II due to the changing of borders and expulsion of local populations, with his hometown being given to Ukraine. Kowalski started cycling professionally with Budowlani Warszawa between 1954–1955, spent a short spell with Stal Stocznia in 1956, before spending the majority of his career with KK Lechia Gdańsk between 1957–1970. It was while with Lechia he enjoyed his greatest success, winning the Tour de Pologne twice, in 1957 and 1961. and winning the Vuelta a Cuba in 1967. Kowalski died in Gdańsk aged 88, and is buried in the Żydowski cemetery in Chełm, Gdańsk.

== Major results ==
1957
1st Berlin–Cottbus–Berlin
1st Overall Tour de Pologne
1959
1st Stage 1 Tour de Pologne
1961
1st Overall Tour de Pologne
1963
2nd GANEFO Games
1967
1st Overall Vuelta a Cuba
