= 2004 Tour de Pologne =

Cycling race

Race details
- Dates: 6–12 September 2004
- Stages: 8
- Distance: 1,264.5 km (785.7 mi)
- Winning time: 29h 21' 38"

Results
	Winner	Ondřej Sosenka (CZE)
	Second	Hugo Sabido (POR)
	Third	Franco Pellizotti (ITA)

The 2004 Tour de Pologne was the 61st edition of the Tour de Pologne cycle race and was held from 6 September to 12 September 2004. The race started in Gdańsk and finished in Karpacz on a route similar to that of the previous edition. The race was won by Ondřej Sosenka.

== General classification ==
Final general classification

Rank	Rider	Time
1	Ondřej Sosenka (CZE)	29h 21' 38"
2	Hugo Sabido (POR)	+ 23"
3	Franco Pellizotti (ITA)	+ 40"
4	Marek Rutkiewicz (POL)	+ 1' 01"
5	Allan Davis (AUS)	+ 1' 44"
6	Florent Brard (FRA)	+ 2' 22"
7	Tomasz Brożyna (POL)	+ 2' 44"
8	David Bernabeu (SPA)	+ 3' 18"
9	Cezary Zamana (POL)	+ 4' 17"
10	Rui Sousa (POR)	+ 5' 37"
