= Legia Warsaw (amputee football) =

Polish amputee football club

- Full name: Legia Warszawa SA
- Nicknames: Wojskowi, Legioniści (The Militarians, Legionaries)
- Founded: 2019; 7 years ago
- Chairman: Dariusz Mioduski
- League: Amp Futbol Ekstraklasa
- 2023: 5th of 7
- Website: http://ampfutbol.legia.pl/

Legia Warszawa (Polish: [ˈlɛɡʲja varˈʂava]), known in English as Legia Warsaw, is a Polish amputee football club founded in 2019 as a section of the Legia Warsaw sports club. The team was created as a result of the transformation of Gloria Varsovia, existing since 2016, which existed after the dissolution of Lampart Warsaw.

== History ==
At the end of April 2019, Legia took part in the beginning of the new season of Amp Futbol Ekstraklasa as the defender of the championship won by Gloria Varsovia. In the first league tournament, played in Płońsk, they took third place.

In May, the team started the competition in the first edition of the EAFF Champions League. On the first day of tournament, Legia defeated Everton 2–1, and then lost to Ortotek Gaziler S.K. 0–5 and finally finished second in the group. On 26 May 2019, in the semi-finals, they lost 1–4 against the champions of Russia, Dinamo Altai, and in the match for the third place, Polish team won 3–2 against Irish Cork City.

In 2020, Legia won their first Polish championship, winning 14 out of 16 matches in the season.

== Performance history in Amp Futbol Ekstraklasa ==
Season	Position	M	W	D	L	GF	GA
as Lampart Warsaw
2015	4/4	12	2	0	10	10	27
2016	3/5	20	9	6	5	25	12
as Gloria Varsovia
2017	2/5	16	9	4	3	30	9
2018	1/4	12	7	2	3	20	7
as Legia Warsaw
2019	3/5	15	7	2	6	32	22
2020	1/5	16	14	0	2	47	9
2021	2/5	20	13	4	3	64	9
2022	3/6	20	14	3	3	47	18
2023	5/7	18	7	4	7	19	20
Lampart Warsaw		32	11	6	15	35	39
Gloria Varsovia		28	16	6	6	50	16
Legia Warsaw		89	55	13	21	209	78
Total		149	82	25	42	294	133
