= Francesco Locatelli =

Italian cyclist

Personal information
- Born: 9 March 1920 Moggio, Italy
- Died: 12 December 1978 (aged 58)

Cycling career
- Sport: Cycling
- Role: Rider

Francesco Locatelli (9 March 1920 – 12 December 1978) was an Italian racing cyclist. He won the 1949 edition of the Tour de Pologne.
