= Viatcheslav Djavanian =

Russian cyclist

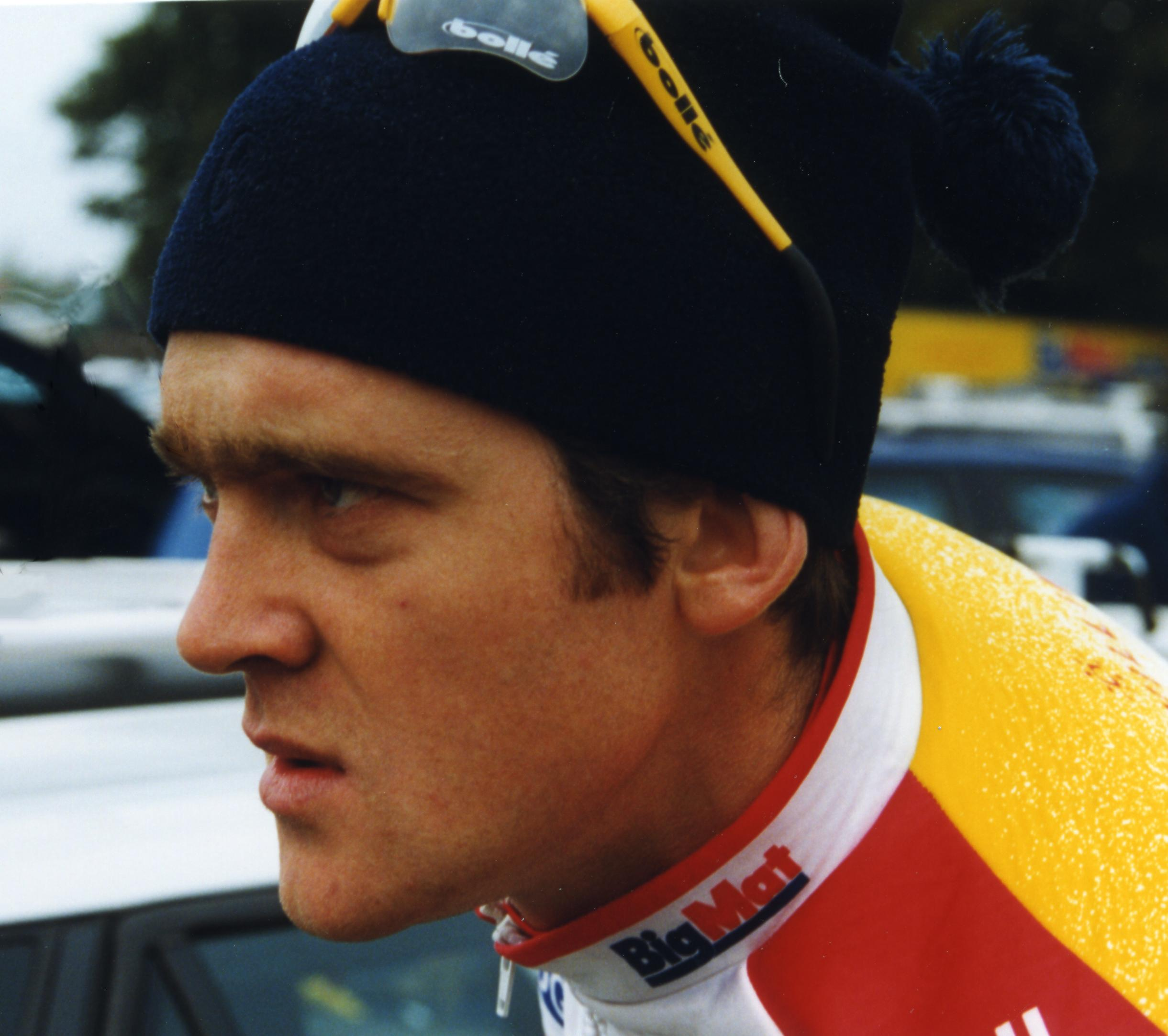
- Djavanian at the 1998 Paris–Tours

Personal information
- Born: 5 April 1969 (age 57) Gyumri, Armenia
- Height: 1.76 m (5 ft 9 1/2 in)
- Weight: 64 kg (141 lb; 10 st 1 lb)

Cycling career
- Sport: Cycling
- Current team: Retired
- Discipline: Road
- Role: Rider

Professional teams
- 1992: Russ–Baikal
- 1994: Rotator Company–Alex
- 1995: Sputnik–Soi
- 1996–1997: Roslotto–ZG Mobili
- 1998: BigMat–Auber 93

Major wins
- Stage races Tour de Pologne (1996)

Viatcheslav Djavanian (born 5 April 1969) is a Russian former professional road cyclist. He won the Tour de Pologne 1996.

== Major results ==
1990
2nd Trofeo Matteotti U23
1991
1st Duo Normand (with Andrey Teteryuk)
2nd Mavic Trophy
4th Road race, UCI Amateur Road World Championships
1992
2nd Overall Settimana Ciclistica Lombarda
1994
1st Overall Vuelta Ciclista del Uruguay

1st Stages 2, 4, 6 & 10

1st Stage 4 GP Lacticoop
1995
1st Overall Four Days of Aisne

1st Stage 4

1st Stage 4 Bayern Rundfahrt
1st Stage 3 GP do Minho
2nd Road race, National Road Championships
1996
1st Tour de Pologne

1st Stages 3 & 4

3rd Millemetri del Corso di Mestre
6th Trofeo Matteotti
7th Gran Premio Città di Camaiore
7th GP du canton d'Argovie
8th Japan Cup
9th Tre Valli Varesine
1997
1st Overall Regio-Tour

1st Stages 1 & 2

3rd Gran Premio Città di Camaiore
6th Overall Giro di Sardegna
9th Veenendaal–Veenendaal
1998
2nd Grand Prix de Villers-Cotterêts
3rd Grand Prix d'Ouverture La Marseillaise
5th Classique des Alpes

=== Grand Tour general classification results timeline ===
Grand Tour	1992	1993	1994	1995	1996	1997	1998
Giro d'Italia	—	—	—	—	69	80	—
Tour de France	—	—	—	—	—	DNF	81
Vuelta a España	114	—	—	—	DNF	—	

Legend
—	Did not compete
DNF	Did not finish
