= Andrzej Mierzejewski =

Polish road racing cyclist (born 1960)

Personal information
- Born: 7 December 1960 (age 65) Chełmża, Poland

Cycling career
- Sport: Cycling
- Discipline: Road
- Role: Rider

Professional teams
- 1989: Exbud
- 1990: Ochsner
- 1990–1992: Subaru–Montgomery
- 1992: Bike Line
- 1992: Bud Light Beer
- 1993–1995: Chevrolet - L.A. Sheriff
- 1996–1997: Mróz

Major wins
- Tour de Pologne (1982, 1984, 1988)

Andrzej Mierzejewski (born 7 December 1960) is a Polish retired road racing cyclist. He won the Tour de Pologne 1982, 1984 and 1988. He also competed in the road race at the 1988 Summer Olympics.

== Palmarès ==
Date	Placing	Event	Competition	Location	Country
1982	1	General classification	Tour de Pologne		Poland
1982	1	Stage 3	Tour de Pologne	Giżycko	Poland
1984	1	Stage 6	Tour of Austria	Söll	Austria
1984	1	Stage 8	Tour of Austria	Linz	Austria
1984	1	General classification	Tour de Pologne		Poland
1984	1	Stage 5	Tour de Pologne	Solina	Poland
1985	1		National road championship		Poland
1985	1	Stage 2	Peace Race		Soviet Union
1987	1	Stage 4	Postgirot Open	Huskvarna	Sweden
1987	1	Prologue	Tour de Pologne	Warsaw	Poland
1988	1		National road championship		Poland
1988	1	Stage 3	Tour of Austria	Sankt Georgen im Attergau	Austria
1988	1	General classification	Tour de Pologne		Poland
1996	1	General classification	Tour of Małopolska		Poland
