= 2002 Tour de Pologne =

Cycling race

Race details
- Dates: 9–15 September 2002
- Stages: 8
- Distance: 1,273.5 km (791.3 mi)
- Winning time: 29h 38' 21"

Results
	Winner	Laurent Brochard (FRA)
	Second	Tomasz Brożyna (POL)
	Third	Marek Rutkiewicz (POL)

The 2002 Tour de Pologne was the 59th edition of the Tour de Pologne cycle race and was held from 9 September to 15 September 2002. The race started in Gdańsk and finished in Karpacz on a route identical to that of the previous edition. The race was won by former world champion Laurent Brochard.

== General classification ==
Final general classification

Rank	Rider	Time
1	Laurent Brochard (FRA)	29h 38' 21"
2	Tomasz Brożyna (POL)	+ 19"
3	Marek Rutkiewicz (POL)	+ 25"
4	Frank Vandenbroucke (BEL)	+ 35"
5	Ondřej Sosenka (CZE)	+ 38"
6	Cezary Zamana (POL)	+ 49"
7	Sławomir Kohut (POL)	+ 1' 41"
8	Benoît Poilvet (FRA)	+ 2' 01"
9	Volodymir Hustov (UKR)	+ 2' 22"
10	Richard Virenque (FRA)	+ 2' 28"
