= Roger Diercken =

Belgian cyclist

Personal information
- Born: 9 February 1939 (age 87) Tielen, Belgium

Cycling career
- Sport: Cycling
- Role: Rider

Roger Diercken (born 9 February 1939) is a Belgian former racing cyclist. He won the Tour de Pologne in 1960. He was born in Tielen, his profession is a postal worker.
