= Tomasz Brożyna =

Polish cyclist

Personal information
- Full name: Tomasz Brożyna
- Born: September 19, 1970 (age 56) Bieliny, Poland

Cycling career
- Sport: Cycling
- Current team: CCC Development Team
- Discipline: Road
- Role: Rider (retired); Directeur sportif

Amateur team
- 1986–1995: Korona Kielce

Professional teams
- 1995: Rotan Spiessens–Hot Dog Louis
- 1996–1997: U.S. Postal Service
- 1998–1999: Mróz
- 2000–2002: Banesto
- 2003: CCC–Polsat
- 2004: Action
- 2005: Knauf Team
- 2006: Intel–Action

Managerial teams
- 2013: Team Wibatech–Brzeg
- 2015–: CCC–Sprandi–Polkowice

Major wins
- Course de la Solidarité Olympique (1991, 1996, 1998, 1999)

Tomasz Brożyna (born 19 September 1970) is a Polish former professional road racing cyclist, who currently works as a directeur sportif for UCI Continental team CCC Development Team. He entered professional cycling in 1996 and retired in 2006 at the age of 36. He is the first Polish cyclist to complete all three of the Grand Tours.

Brożyna was a member of the Korona Kielce (1986–1995), Rotan Spiessens–Hot Dog Louis(1995), U.S. Postal Service (1996–1997), Intel–Action (1998–1999, 2004, and 2006), iBanesto.com (2000–2002), CCC–Polsat (2003), and Knauf teams (2005).

His son Piotr Brożyna is also a professional cyclist.

== Major results ==
1990
1st Stage 5a (ITT) Tour de Pologne
1991
1st Overall Course de Solidarność et des Champions Olympiques
1992
3rd Overall Peace Race
1993
3rd Overall Course de Solidarność et des Champions Olympiques
5th Overall Peace Race
1994
1st Team time trial, National Road Championships
3rd Overall Tour de Pologne
4th Overall Regio-Tour
1995
1st Overall Tour of Małopolska
3rd Overall Peace Race
1996
National Road Championships

1st Two-man time trial
2nd Individual time trial

1st Overall Course de Solidarność et des Champions Olympiques
1998
1st Road race, National Road Championships
1st Overall Course de Solidarność et des Champions Olympiques
6th Route Adélie de Vitré
1999
1st Overall Tour de Pologne
1st Overall Course de Solidarność et des Champions Olympiques

1st Stages 2 & 3 (ITT)

1st Overall Tour of Małopolska
2nd Tatra Cup
3rd Overall Peace Race

1st Stage 9

2000
1st Overall Route du Sud
2002
1st Stage 1 (TTT) Volta a Portugal
2nd Overall Tour de Pologne
7th Overall GP Mitsubishi

1st Stage 3 (TTT)

2003
4th Overall Course de Solidarność et des Champions Olympiques

1st Stage 3

2004
1st Overall Tour de Beauce

1st Stage 2

3rd Overall Bayern–Rundfahrt
7th Overall Tour de Pologne
2006
2nd Overall Tour de Luxembourg
