= 2001 Tour de Pologne =

Cycling race

Race details
- Dates: 3–9 September 2001
- Stages: 8
- Distance: 1,273.5 km (791.3 mi)
- Winning time: 29h 56' 58"

Results
	Winner	Ondřej Sosenka (CZE)
	Second	Jens Voigt (GER)
	Third	Piotr Przydział (POL)

The 2001 Tour de Pologne was the 58th edition of the Tour de Pologne cycle race l. It was held from 3 September to 9 September 2001. The race started in Gdańsk and finished in Karpacz. The race was won by Ondřej Sosenka.

== General classification ==
Final general classification

Rank	Rider	Time
1	Ondřej Sosenka (CZE)	29h 56' 58"
2	Jens Voigt (GER)	+ 28"
3	Piotr Przydział (POL)	+ 1' 59"
4	Kim Kirchen (LUX)	+ 4' 34"
5	Romāns Vainšteins (LAT)	+ 5' 27"
6	Sylwester Szmyd (POL)	+ 6' 03"
7	Zbigniew Piątek (POL)	+ 6' 38"
8	Vladimir Karpets (RUS)	+ 6' 58"
9	Serge Baguet (BEL)	+ 9' 19"
10	Volodymir Hustov (UKR)	+ 10' 06"
