= Jan Stachura =

Polish cyclist

Personal information
- Born: 24 September 1948 (age 78)

Cycling career
- Sport: Cycling
- Role: Rider

Jan Stachura (born 24 September 1948) is a Polish former racing cyclist. He won the Tour de Pologne 1970.
