= Jerzy Lipiński =

Polish cyclist

Personal information
- Born: 1 February 1908 Warsaw, Poland
- Died: 13 September 2000 (aged 92)

Cycling career
- Sport: Cycling
- Role: Rider

Jerzy Lipiński (1 February 1908 – 13 September 2000) was a Polish racing cyclist. He won the 1933 edition of the Tour de Pologne.
