= Charlie Cunningham (mountain biker) =

American mountain biker (1948–2026)

- Born: August 23, 1948; Washington, D.C., U.S.
- Died: June 2, 2026 (aged 77); San Anselmo, California, U.S.
- Occupation: Mountain bike pioneer
- Known for: Wilderness Trail Bikes

Charles Burr Cunningham (August 23, 1948 – June 2, 2026) was an American mountain biker from Fairfax, California.

Along with the frame builder Steve Potts and his helper Mark Slate, Cunningham co-founded Wilderness Trail Bikes, which he and Potts operated from 1982 until 2002, when both departed the company. Cunningham and his wife, Jacquie Phelan, were charter inductees to Crested Butte's Mountain Bike Hall of Fame.

== Early life ==
Charles Burr Cunningham was born in Washington, D.C., on August 23, 1948. He came from an Air Force family and lived in Alabama, Virginia, Japan, and San Diego during his childhood, ultimately settling in Mill Valley on Mount Tamalpais, Marin County. His father was a World War II and Korean War fighter pilot who won the Thompson Trophy in 1949, the only year military jets (F-86) competed. His mother was a book artist whose imprint Sunflower Press is found in several museum collections. In his twenties, Cunningham studied nutrition, water quality, and chemistry, as well as engineering. At 25, he became interested in bicycles.

== Inventions ==
In the early 1980s, Cunningham invented a number of features for use on modern mountain bikes:

- tubular-style fork crowns
- 135 mm lower-dish rear wheel for mountain bikes, which are now the standard
- identifying the fundamental tread design principles needed for well-performing mountain bike tires. Cunningham co-designed Ground Control, a tire incorporating these principles.
- the Grease Guard Bearing System that allows bicyclists to replace the dirty grease that gets into bicycle bearings with clean grease in seconds, thus extending component life and saving time and money spent fixing and/or replacing parts.
- the Roller Cam Brake. The brake arms, the pivot mounting location, and the linkage combined to eliminate flex in the fork blades and frame stays. This brake also featured the linear spring he invented, now used on almost all V-Brakes. The cam was eventually replaced with the Lever Link.

== Competitive career ==
Cunningham raced competitively in 1984, placing tenth overall at the NORBA championships in Nederland, Colorado. He became National Vet Champion at the age of 36.

Cunningham built a total of 187 aluminum bicycles (the Indian, the Racer, and the Wombat for smaller people) between 1979 and 1992. They were guaranteed for life and cost about six times as much as custom (steel) bikes.

== Later life and death ==
Cunningham was involved in a cycling crash in 2015, in which he sustained severe head injuries. He died at a care facility in San Anselmo, California, from complications of that accident on June 2, 2026, at the age of 77.
