= Stanisław Grzelak =

Polish cyclist

Personal information
- Born: 12 May 1920

Cycling career
- Sport: Cycling
- Role: Rider

Stanisław Grzelak (born 12 May 1920) was a Polish racing cyclist. He won the 1947 edition of the Tour de Pologne.
