= KK Lechia Gdańsk =

Cycling club based in Gdańsk, Poland

Klub Kolarski Lechia Gdańsk
Team information
- Registered: Gdańsk, Poland
- Disciplines: Road, Mountain bike

Klub Kolarski Lechia Gdańsk (English: Cycling Club Lechia Gdańsk) is a Polish cycling club based in Gdańsk, Poland. For the most part of its history the club was not successful and has been seen as more of a cycling club for the residents of Gdańsk to join. The team however did have some success in its early days, with the tour wins at the Tour de Pologne in 1957 and 1961 being the most notable in the team's history. Henryk Kowalski, the rider for Lechia was the winning rider on both occasions. In the club's recent years the only notable success since the turn of the century has been at the Polish Mountain Biking Championships where Michał Bogdziewicz won the marathon classification and finished runner-up in the elite classification.

== Honours ==
=== Road racing ===
Tour de Pologne

Overall 1957 Tour de Pologne, Henryk Kowalski
Overall 1961 Tour de Pologne, Henryk Kowalski

1959 – Stage 1, Henryk Kowalski

=== Mountain bike racing ===
Polish Mountain Biking Championship

Marathon classification

Winner – 2003, Michał Bogdziewicz

Elite classification

Runner-up – 2003, Michał Bogdziewicz
