= Jon Bru =

Spanish cyclist

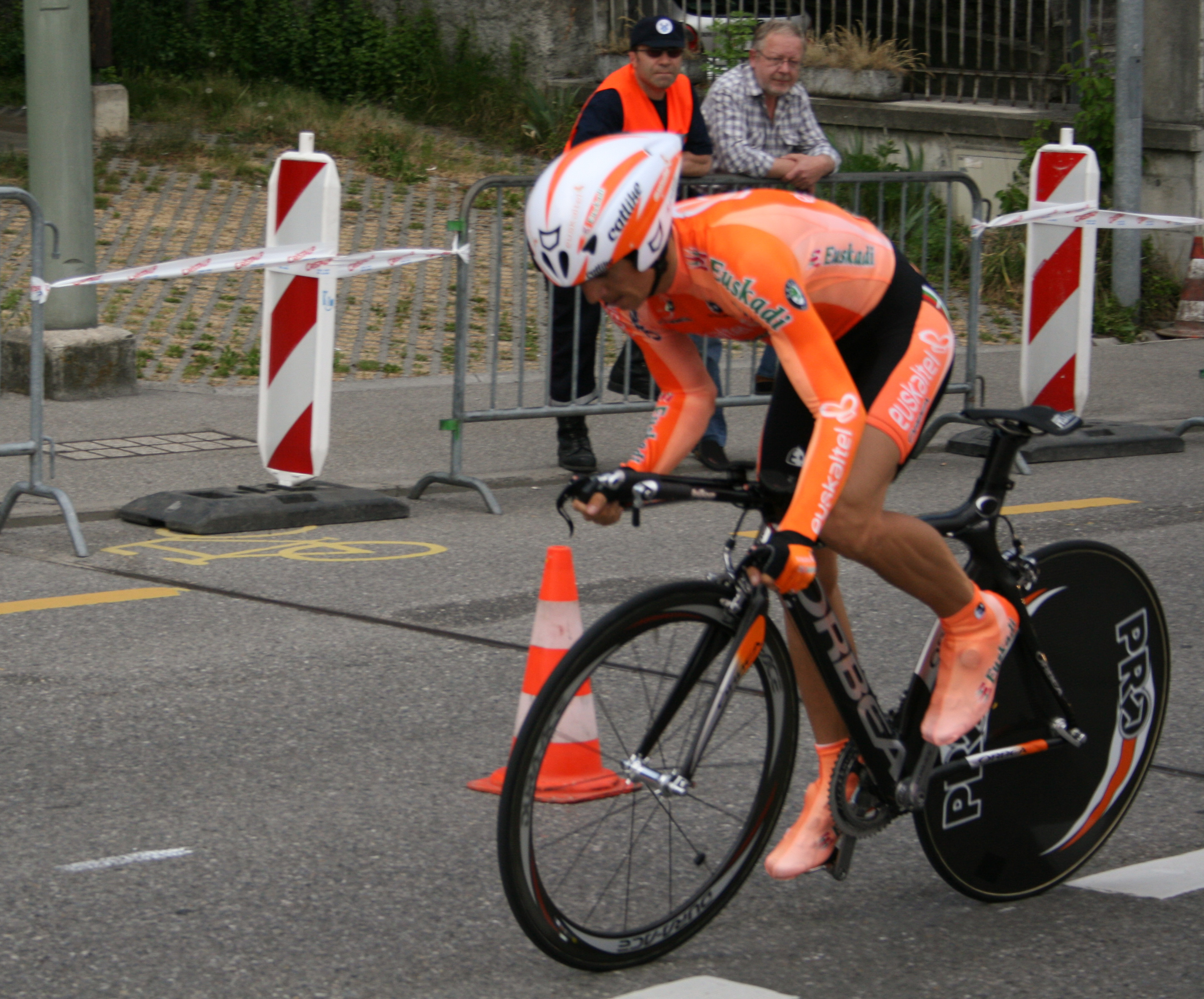

Personal information
- Full name: Jon Bru Pascal
- Born: 18 October 1977 (age 48) Bera, Spain

Cycling career
- Sport: Cycling
- Current team: Retired
- Discipline: Road
- Role: Rider

Amateur team
- 2000: Banesto (stagiaire)

Professional teams
- 2001–2004: Paredes Rota dos Móveis–Tintas VIP
- 2005–2006: Kaiku
- 2007–2008: Euskaltel–Euskadi

Jon Bru Pascal (born 18 October 1977 in Bera, Navarre) is a Spanish former professional road bicycle racer, who rode professionally between 2001 and 2008 for the Antarte–Rota dos Móveis, Kaiku and Euskaltel–Euskadi teams.

== Major results ==
2001
1st Memorial Valenciaga
2002
1st Classica do Seixal
2003
1st Stage 3 Volta a Terras de Santa Maria
2004
1st Voltas à Vila do Bombarral
2006
Volta ao Distrito de Santarém

1st Points classification
1st Mountains classification
1st Stages 2 & 4
