= Ondřej Sosenka =

Czech cyclist

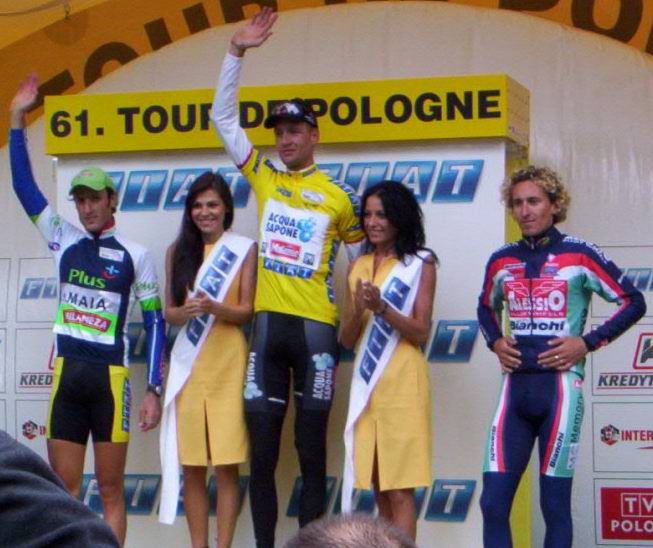
- Sosenka, 2004 Tour de Pologne

Personal information
- Full name: Ondřej Sosenka
- Born: 9 December 1975 (age 50) Prague, Czechoslovakia
- Height: 2.00 m (6 ft 6 1/2 in)
- Weight: 82 kg (181 lb; 12 st 13 lb)

Cycling career
- Sport: Cycling
- Current team: Retired
- Disciplines: Road, track
- Role: Rider

Professional teams
- 2000: PSK–Unit Expert
- 2001–2003: CCC
- 2004–2006: Acqua e Sapone
- 2007: CK Pribram Bei
- 2008: PSK Whirlpool–Author

Major wins
- Hour record 2005 until 2014

Ondřej Sosenka (born 9 December 1975) is a Czech professional cyclist who last rode for the UCI Professional Continental team PSK Whirlpool-Author. He won the Peace Race in 2002. He broke the five-year-old UCI hour record on 19 July 2005 in Moscow, Russia, riding 49.7 kilometres (30.9 mi) in one hour.

== Biography ==
Sosenka was known as one of the largest professional cyclists competing in Europe. Standing 200 cm (6 ft 6 1/2 in) tall, he weighs 83 to 90 kg (183 to 198 lb) and rides a track bicycle with 190 mm (7.5 in) cranks. For his 2005-hour record attempt, he used a custom carbon fiber bicycle manufactured by Francesco Moser cycles.

In 2006, he won the Czech Republic national time trial championships and following this the two-man time trial Duo Normand with Radek Blahut.

=== Doping ===
Sosenka was excluded from the 2001 Peace Race after failing a hematocrit test prior to the event and received a two-week ban.

In June 2008, he tested positive for the banned stimulant methamphetamine and its metabolites during his national time trial championships, and received a suspension which ended his career.

== Major results ==
1997
1st Stage 3 Hessen-Rundfahrt
3rd Liège–Bastogne–Liège Espoirs
1998
National Road Championships

1st Time trial
3rd Road race

1999
1st Overall Okolo Slovenska
2000
1st Time trial, National Road Championships
1st Stage 10 Peace Race
2001
1st Time trial, National Road Championships
1st Overall Tour de Pologne

1st Stage 8

1st Overall Course de Solidarność et des Champions Olympiques

1st Stage 4b

2002
National Road Championships

1st Time trial
3rd Road race

1st Overall Peace Race

1st Stages 4 & 10

1st Stage 5 Course de Solidarność et des Champions Olympiques
3rd Overall Tour de Luxembourg
5th Overall Tour de Pologne

1st Stage 8

2003
1st Overall Okolo Slovenska

1st Stages 4 & 5 (ITT)

2nd Overall Peace Race

1st Stage 4

3rd Time trial, National Road Championships
9th Overall Tour de Suisse
2004
National Road Championships

1st Road race
2nd Time trial

1st Overall Tour de Pologne

1st Stage 8 (ITT)

3rd Firenze–Pistoia
10th Overall Vuelta a Burgos
10th Milano–Torino
2005
Hour record: 49.700 km
1st Time trial, National Road Championships
1st Chrono des Nations
1st Stage 3b (ITT) Tour of Belgium
5th Overall International UNIQA Classic

1st Prologue

2006
1st Time trial, National Road Championships
1st Duo Normand (with Radek Blahut)
2007
9th Duo Normand (with Jan Novák)

== See also ==
- List of doping cases in cycling

Records
Preceded by Chris Boardman	UCI hour record (49.700 km); 19 July 2005 – 18 September 2014	Succeeded by Jens Voigt
