= Marian Więckowski =

Polish cyclist (1933–2020)

Personal information
- Born: 8 September 1933 Warsaw, Poland
- Died: 17 July 2020 (aged 86)

Cycling career
- Sport: Cycling
- Role: Rider

Marian Więckowski (8 September 1933 – 17 July 2020) was a Polish racing cyclist. He won the Tour de Pologne in 1954, 1955 and 1956.
