= Jan Kudra =

Polish cyclist (1937–2023)

Personal information
- Born: 5 July 1937 Łódź, Poland
- Died: 31 January 2023 (aged 85)

Cycling career
- Sport: Cycling

Jan Kudra (5 July 1937 – 31 January 2023) was a Polish cyclist. He competed in the individual road race at the 1964 Summer Olympics. He won the Tour de Pologne in 1962 and 1968.

Kudra died on 31 January 2023, at the age of 85.
