= Feliks Więcek =

Polish cyclist

Personal information
- Born: 10 November 1904 Ignaców, Poland
- Died: 17 August 1978 (aged 73) Łódź, Poland

Cycling career
- Sport: Cycling
- Role: Rider

Feliks Więcek (10 November 1904 – 17 August 1978) was a Polish racing cyclist. He won the 1928 edition of the Tour de Pologne.
