= Rajmund Zieliński =

Polish cyclist (1940–2022)

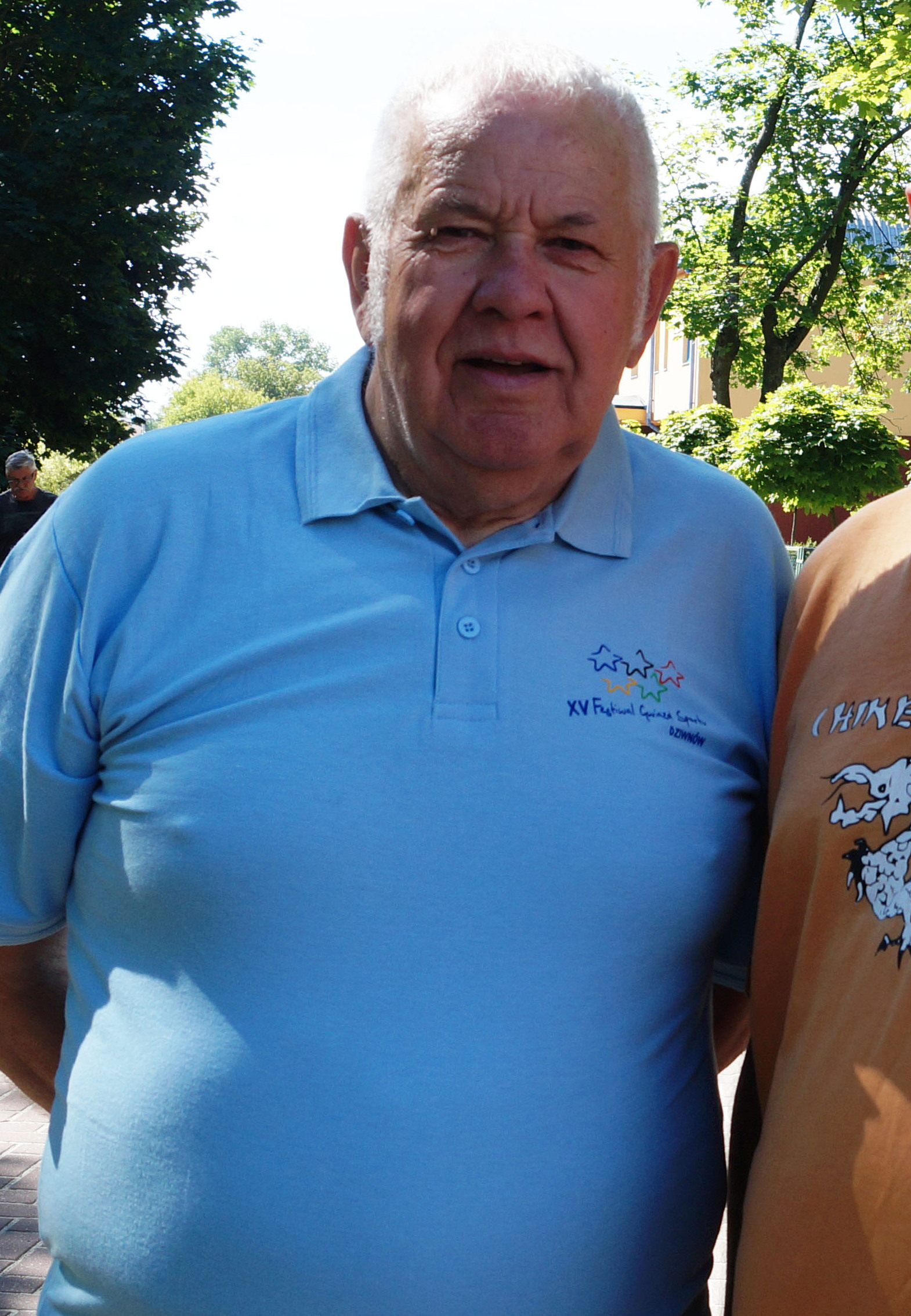
- Zieliński in 2016

Personal information
- Born: 9 October 1940 Toruń, Reichsgau Danzig-West Prussia, Germany (now Poland)
- Died: 15 August 2022 (aged 81)

Cycling career
- Sport: Cycling

Rajmund Zieliński (9 October 1940 – 15 August 2022) was a Polish cyclist. He competed at the 1964 Summer Olympics and the 1968 Summer Olympics. In 1964, he won the Tour de Pologne.

Zieliński died on 15 August 2022, at the age of 81.
