= Lechosław Michalak =

Polish cyclist

Personal information
- Born: 22 September 1956 (age 70) Żyrardów, Poland

Cycling career
- Sport: Cycling
- Role: Rider

Lechosław Michalak (born 22 September 1956) is a Polish former racing cyclist. He won the Tour de Pologne in 1977.
