= Wacław Wójcik =

Polish cyclist

Personal information
- Born: 19 November 1919 Rozhyshche, Ukraine
- Died: 28 December 1997 (aged 78) Warsaw, Poland

Cycling career
- Sport: Cycling
- Role: Rider

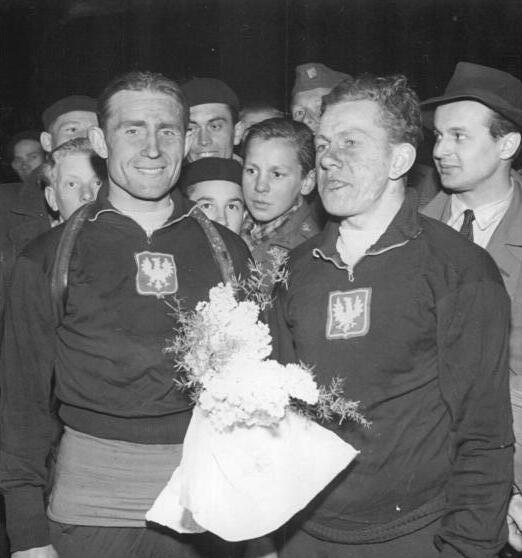
Federal Archives Image 183-10537-0002, Wojcik, Hadasik.jpg

Wacław Wójcik (19 November 1919 – 28 December 1997) was a Polish racing cyclist. He won the Tour de Pologne in 1948 and 1952.
