= Legia Warsaw (sports club) =

Polish Sports Club based in Warsaw

- Nickname: Wojskowi ("Militarians"), Legioniści ("Legionnaires", "Legionarries")
- Founded: March 1916 as Drużyna Sportowa Legia
- Home ground: Stadion Wojska Polskiego, 3 Łazienkowska Street, Warsaw

Legia Warszawa (Polish: [ˈlɛɡʲja varˈʂava]), known in English as Legia Warsaw, is a Polish multi-sports club based in Warsaw, Poland.

== History and overview ==
Legia was formed between 5 and 15 March 1916 during military operations in World War I on the Eastern Front in the neighborhood of Manevychi (Maniewicze) in Volhynia Governorate, as the main football club of the Polish Legions. The team had started its first training earlier in the spring of 1915, in the city of Piotrków Trybunalski. In July 1916, due to the Brusilov Offensive, Legia permanently moved to the capital city of Warsaw.

The "Legia" has several teams in many sports, the most famous of which are: the football club and its reserve team; the ice hockey club; the basketball club and the volleyball club.

Other sections include: RC Legia Warszawa rugby union club, futsal, horse riding, gymnastics, judo, athletics, weightlifting, cycling, tennis, wrestling, waterpolo, squash, swimming, fencing, amputee football, badminton and windsurfing.

There used to be (but now defunct) table tennis and speedway sections. The speedway section was created in late 1929, officially celebrating its anniversary on 8 December. In 1957, Legia celebrated their first Polish champion in Marian Kaiser, before winning the bronze medal in 1959, which was their last season because they merged with LPŻ Neptun Gdańsk but remained in Gdańsk.

Zofia Klepacka is part of the windsurfing section of the club. As a 14-year old, Iga Świątek represented the tennis section of the club.

In 2019, the Legia section in amputee football was created.
