= Józef Beker =

Polish cyclist (1937–2026)

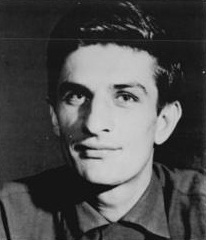
- Beker in 1961

Personal information
- Born: 28 March 1937 Staremiasto, Poland (now Stare Misto, Ukraine)
- Died: 18 March 2026 (aged 88)
- Height: 180 cm (5 ft 11 in)
- Weight: 76 kg (168 lb)

Cycling career
- Sport: Cycling

Professional team
- LZS Mokrzeszów

Józef Beker (28 March 1937 – 18 March 2026) was a Polish cyclist. He competed in the team time trial at the 1964 Summer Olympics. He won the Tour de Pologne in 1965. He was born in Mokrzeszow, and worked as a lathe operator. Beker died in March 2026, at the age of 88.
