= Jan Brzeźny =

Polish cyclist (1951–2026)

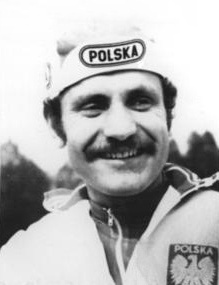
- Brzeźny in 1977

Personal information
- Born: 11 June 1951 Oleszna, Poland
- Died: 11 June 2026 (aged 75)
- Height: 1.78 m (5 ft 10 in)
- Weight: 73 kg (161 lb)

Sport
- Sport: Cycling
- Club: Dolmelu Warszawa

Jan Brzeźny (11 June 1951 – 11 June 2026) was a Polish cyclist. He competed at the 1976 Summer Olympics in the individual road race and finished in 30th place. He won the Tour of Britain in 1978 and Tour de Pologne in 1978 and 1981. He finished second in the Tour de Pologne in 1976.

Brzeźny was married to Teresa. They had a daughter and two sons, and lived in Wrocław.

Brzeźny died on 11 June 2026, his 75th birthday.
