= Mavic =

Mavic may refer to:

- Mavic (bicycle parts company), a French manufacturer of bicycle parts
- DJI Mavic, a series of compact UAV drones by DJI
- Mavic Chen, a fictional character in Doctor Who from the 1965 serial "The Daleks' Master Plan"

== See also ==
- Mavick Teo Hui Mau, a contestant on Malaysian Idol
- Mavik (trandolapril), an ACE inhibitor
