= Czesław Lang =

Polish cyclist

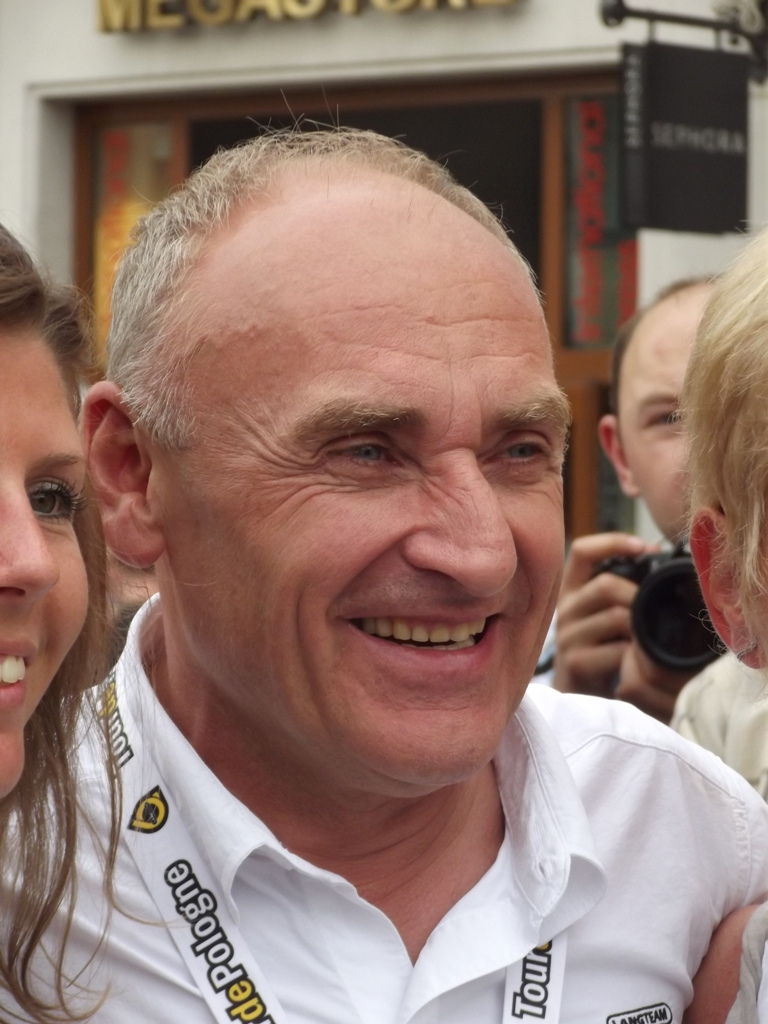

Personal information
- Full name: Czesław Lang
- Born: 17 May 1955 (age 71) Kołczygłowy, Poland

Cycling career
- Sport: Cycling
- Discipline: Road
- Role: Rider

Professional teams
- 1982–1983: Gis Gelati
- 1984–1985: Carrera–Inoxpran
- 1986–1988: Del Tongo
- 1989: Malvor-Sidi
Medal record
Men's road bicycle racing
Representing Poland
Olympic Games
Silver medal – second place	1980 Moscow	Road race, individual

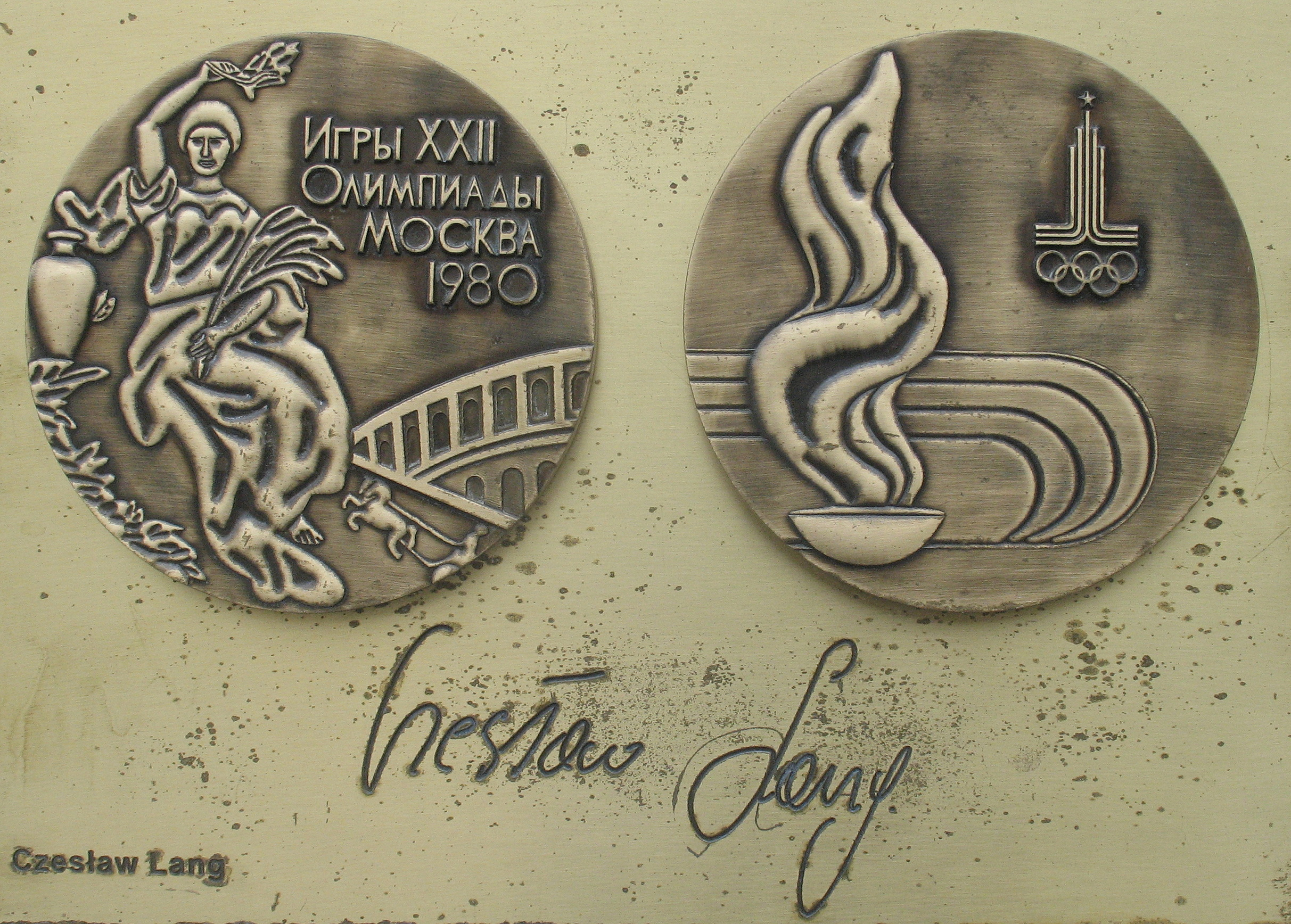
Copy of Cz. Lang medal and autograph in Avenue Sports Star in Dziwnów

Czesław Stanisław Lang (born 17 May 1955) is a Polish former road racing cyclist.

He was a bronze medalist at the 1977 UCI Road World Championships in San Cristóbal and a silver medalist at the 1979 UCI Road World Championships in Valkenburg, both in the men's amateur team time trial. He was also the winner of the 1980 edition of the Tour de Pologne.

He competed for Poland at the 1976 Summer Olympics in Montreal and the 1980 Summer Olympics held in Moscow, Soviet Union in the individual road race, where he finished in second place.

Since 1993, he has been the Director of the Tour de Pologne.
