= Zbigniew Piątek =

Polish cyclist (born 1966)

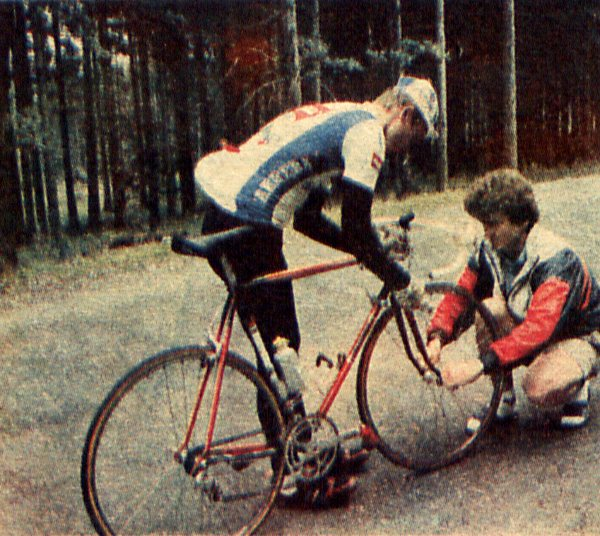

Personal information
- Full name: Zbigniew Piątek
- Born: 1 May 1966 (age 60) Kielce, Poland
- Height: 1.85 m (6 ft 1 in)
- Weight: 71 kg (157 lb; 11.2 st)

Cycling career
- Sport: Cycling
- Discipline: Road
- Role: Rider

Professional teams
- 1994–1995: Collstrop
- 1996: Pecaes-Bolato-Langrover
- 1999: Mróz
- 2000: MAT-Ceresit-CCC
- 2001–2003: Mróz–Supradyn Witaminy
- 2004: Vlaanderen–T Interim
- 2005: Action–Ati

Zbigniew Piątek (born 1 May 1966) is a Polish former road racing cyclist. He was active as an amateur from 1987 to 1993 and from 1994 to 2005 as a professional. He won many of the top races in Poland: the Tour de Pologne, Tour of Małopolska and Szlakiem Grodów Piastowskich. He represented Poland in two Summer Olympics: in 1992 and 2000.

== Career victories ==
1987
1st Overall Tour de Pologne
1988
2nd Overall Tour du Loir et Cher E Provost
1989
1st Overall Tour of Małopolska
1991
1st Stage 1 Tour de Pologne
1993
1st GP Brissago
1997
1st GP Buchholz
1998
1st Overall Tour of Małopolska
1st Stage 2a Kalisz–Konin
1999
3rd Overall Circuit de Lorraine
8th Overall Course Cycliste de Solidarnosc et des Champions Olympiques
2000
6th Overall Course Cycliste de Solidarnosc et des Champions Olympiques
2001
1st Overall Tour of Małopolska

1st Stage 3

2nd Overall Herald Sun Tour

1st Stages 10 & 12 (TTT)

2nd Memoriał Henryka Łasaka
3rd Overall Tour de Beauce
5th Omloop van de Vlaamse Scheldeboorden
5th Memoriał Andrzeja Trochanowskiego
7th Overall Tour de Pologne
2002
1st Stage 3 Giro del Capo
1st Wyscig Pasmen Gor Swietokryskich
2nd Overall Course Cycliste de Solidarnosc et des Champions Olympiques
4th Grand Prix Midtbank
5th Overall Peace Race
5th First Union Invitational
7th Grand Prix Pino Cerami
10th Szlakiem Walk Majora Hubala
2003
1st Overall Bohemia Tour

1st Stage 4

1st Pomorski Klasyk
4th Tartu GP
8th Overall Tour de Pologne
8th Overall Okolo Slovenska
8th Grand Prix S.A.T.S.
2004
10th Druivenkoers Overijse
2005
1st Overall Szlakiem Grodów Piastowskich

1st Stage 2

5th Overall Tour of Małopolska
