= Mróz (cycling team) =

Mróz–Active Jet
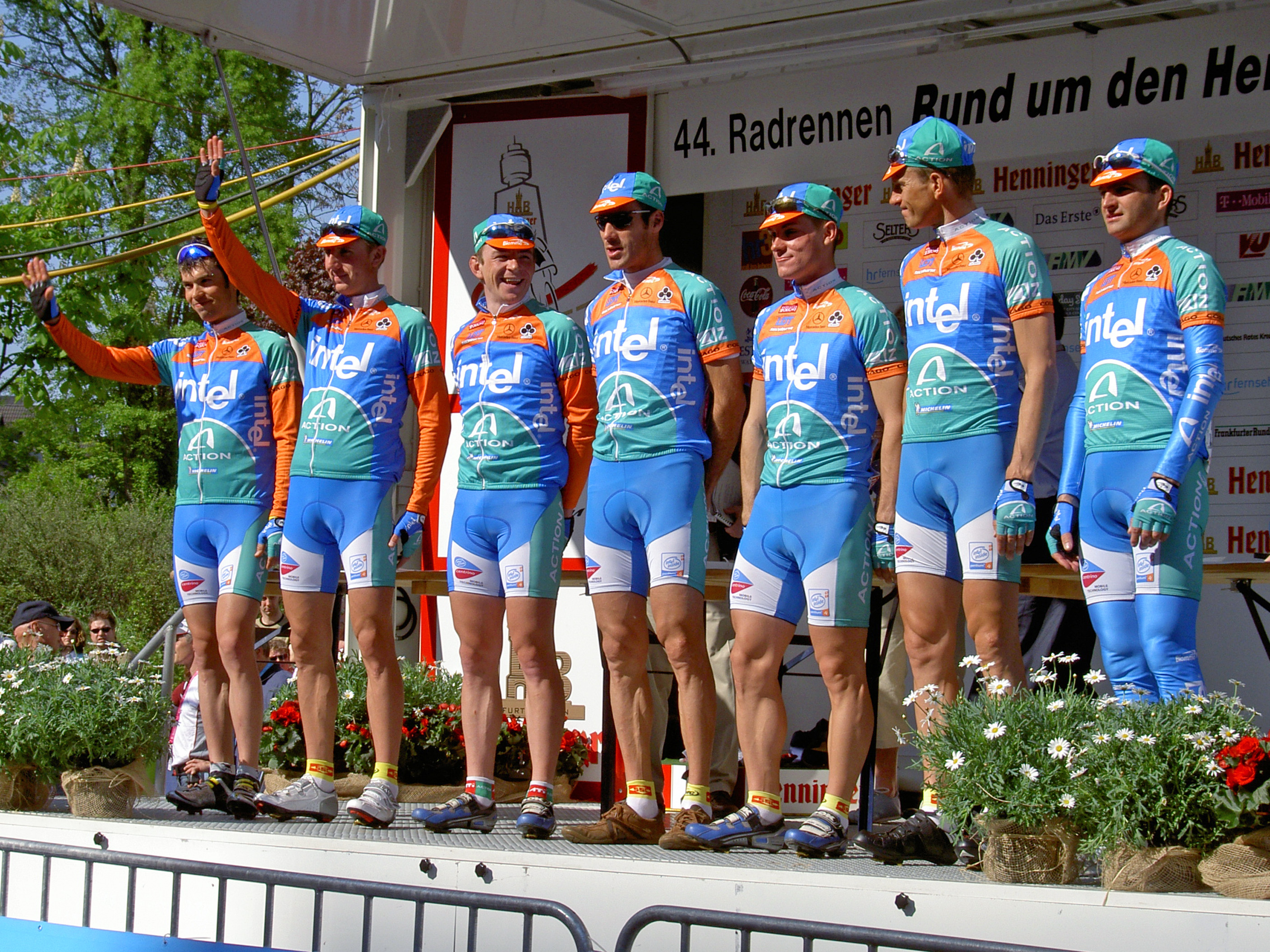
- The team in 2005

Team information
- UCI code: MRO
- Registered: Poland
- Founded: 1996
- Disbanded: 2011
- Disciplines: Road&MTB
- Status: 1998–2002: Div. II; 2003: Div. III; 2004: Div. II; 2005–2007: ProCont; 2008: Club; 2009–2010: Cont; 2011: MTB

Key personnel
- General manager: Piotr Kosmala
- Team managers: Robert Duda; Zbigniew Piątek

Team name history
- 1996–1999 2000–2002 2003 2004 2005–2006 2007 2008 2009 2010–2011: Mróz; Mróz–Supradyn Witaminy; Action–NVidia–Mróz; Action–ATI; Intel–Action; Action–Uniqa; Mróz–Action–Uniqa; Mróz Continental Team; Mróz–Active Jet

Mróz–Active Jet (UCI team code: MRO) was a professional cycling team based in Poland that competed from 1998 to 2011. The team was managed by Piotr Kosmala, who was assisted by directeur sportifs Robert Duda and Zbigniew Piątek.

== Major wins ==
1999
Stage 1, 4 & 6 Vuelta a Argentina
Overall Settimana Lombarda

Stage 4b

Overall Szlakiem Grodów Piastowskich

Stage 2a

Stage 4 Circuit des Mines
Stage 3, 7 & 8 Course de la Paix
Overall Tour of Japan

Stage 2

Stage 4 Tour of Britain
Overall Course de la Solidarité Olympique

Stage 2 & 3

(Lithuania) Lithuanian Time Trial Championship
(Poland) Polish Road Race Championship
Overall Bałtyk–Karkonosze Tour

Stage 1a, 3, 5 & 6

Stage 8 & 11 Volta a Portugal
Memoriał Henryka Łasaka
Memoriał Andrzeja Kaczyny i Andrzeja Malinowskiego
Puchar Tatr
Overall Tour de Pologne

Stage 5, 6 & 7

Stage 5a, 7a & 9a, Commonwealth Bank Classic
2000
Overall Tour d'Egypte

Stage 1, 2, 4, 5, 6 & 7

Overall Ringerike GP

Stage 1

Overall Szlakiem Grodów Piastowskich

Stage 1, 2a, 2b & 3

GP Weltour
Lubelski Wyścig 3-Majowy
Overall Course de la Paix

Stage 2

Stage 1, 2, 5 & 6 Tour of Japan
Overall Course de la Solidarité Olympique

Stage 2a, 2b & 3

First Union Wilmington Classic
GP Ostrowca Swiętokrzyskiego
(Poland) Polish Road Race Championship
(Poland) Polish Time Trial Championship
(Lithuania) Lithuanian Time Trial Championship
Stage 2, 4, 5b & 6 Bałtyk–Karkonosze Tour
Memoriał Andrzeja Kaczyny i Andrzeja Malinowskiego
Puchar Tatr
Memoriał Henryka Łasaka
Stage 1 Tour de Pologne
Overall Herald Sun Tour

Stage 7

Overall Commonwealth Bank Classic

Stage 3a, 3b, 4a, 5a, 9a

2001
Overall Giro del Capo

Stage 2

Stage 1 Ringerike GP
Overall Szlakiem Grodów Piastowskich

Stage 2a

Memoriał Andrzeja Trochanowskiego
Stage 2, 6 & 8b, Course de la Paix
Memoriał Pawła Sosika
Overall Tour of Japan

Stage 1 & 4

Stage 1 GP de Beauce
GP Ostrowca Swiętokrzyskiego
(Lithuania) Lithuanian Time Trial Championship
Stage 3 Dookoła Mazowska
Memoriał Henryka Łasaka
Memoriał Andrzeja Kaczyny i Andrzeja Malinowskiego
GP Z.M. "Mroz"
Stage 3 & 5 Tour de Pologne
Stage 3 & 4 Course 4 Asy Fiata Autopoland
Stage 7b & 10 Herald Sun Tour
2002
Stage 3 Giro del Capo
Stage 2a & 3 Szlakiem Grodów Piastowskich
Lubelski Wyścig 3-Majowy
Memoriał Andrzeja Trochanowskiego
Stage 6a & 7 Course de la Paix
Overall Tour of Japan

Stage 3

Overall Bałtyk–Karkonosze Tour

Stage 1 & 5a

(Lithuania) Lithuanian Road Race Championship
(Lithuania) Lithuanian Time Trial Championship
(Kyrgyzstan) Kirghizistan Road Race Championship
(Kyrgyzstan) Kirghizistan Time Trial Championship
(Ukraine) Ukrainian Road Race Championship
Karp Milicki
Wyścig Kolarski
Stage 4 Tour de Pologne
Stage 2a Course 4 Asy Fiata Autopoland
2003
Stage 1 & 3 Szlakiem Grodów Piastowskich
Stage 7 Course de la Paix
Overall Bałtyk–Karkonosze Tour

Stage 6a

Overall Bohemia Tour

Stage 3

Overall Tour of Małopolska

Stage 1 & 2

Memoriał Henryka Łasaka
Puchar Ministra Obrony Narodowej
Stage 2 Tour de Slovaquie
Wyścig Kolarski o Puchar Trzech Miast
Overall Tour de Pologne

Stage 6

2004
Stage 1 Bałtyk–Karkonosze Tour
Overall GP de Beauce

Stage 2

(Kyrgyzstan) Kirghizistan Road Race Championship
(Kyrgyzstan) Kirghizistan Time Trial Championship
Overall Course de la Solidarité Olympique

Stage 3

Overall Dookoła Mazowsza

Stage 3

Puchar Ministra Obrony Narodowej
Szlakiem Walk Majora Hubala
Overall Tour de Slovaquie

Stage 3a

Stage 6 Tour de Pologne
2005
Stage 1 Niedersachsen-Rundfahrt
Overall Szlakiem Grodów Piastowskich

Stage 2 & 4

Międzynarodowy 3-Majow Wyścig
Stage 5 Four Days of Dunkirk
Stage 3 & 6 Bałtyk–Karkonosze Tour
(Poland) Polish Road Race Championship
Overall Course de la Solidarité Olympique

Stage 1, 2, 3 & 4

Pomorski Klasyk
Overall Tour of Małopolska
Overall Hessen-Rundfahrt

Stage 2

2006
Stage 5 Bałtyk–Karkonosze Tour
(Poland) Polish Road Race Championship
Stage 3, 6 & 9 Tour of Qinghai Lake
2nd Overall Tour de Luxembourg
2007
Stage 3 & 4 Szlakiem Grodów Piastowskich
(Poland) Polish Time Trial Championship
Overall Course de la Solidarité Olympique

Stage 4

Overall Tour of Hainan

Stage 5 & 7

2008
Stage 7 Tour of Japan
Overall Szlakiem Grodów Piastowskich
Stage 5 Tour of Qinghai Lake
Stage 6 Bałtyk–Karkonosze Tour
2009
Memoriał Andrzeja Trochanowskiego
Overall Szlakiem Grodów Piastowskich

Stage 2

Stage 1 & 7 Bałtyk–Karkonosze Tour
2010
Overall Szlakiem Grodów Piastowskich

Stage 1

Overall Tour of Małopolska
Poland, Road Race Championship
Overall Course de la Solidarité Olympique

Stage 4 & 5

Memoriał Henryka Łasaka
Puchar Uzdrowisk Karpackich
