= Karpacz =

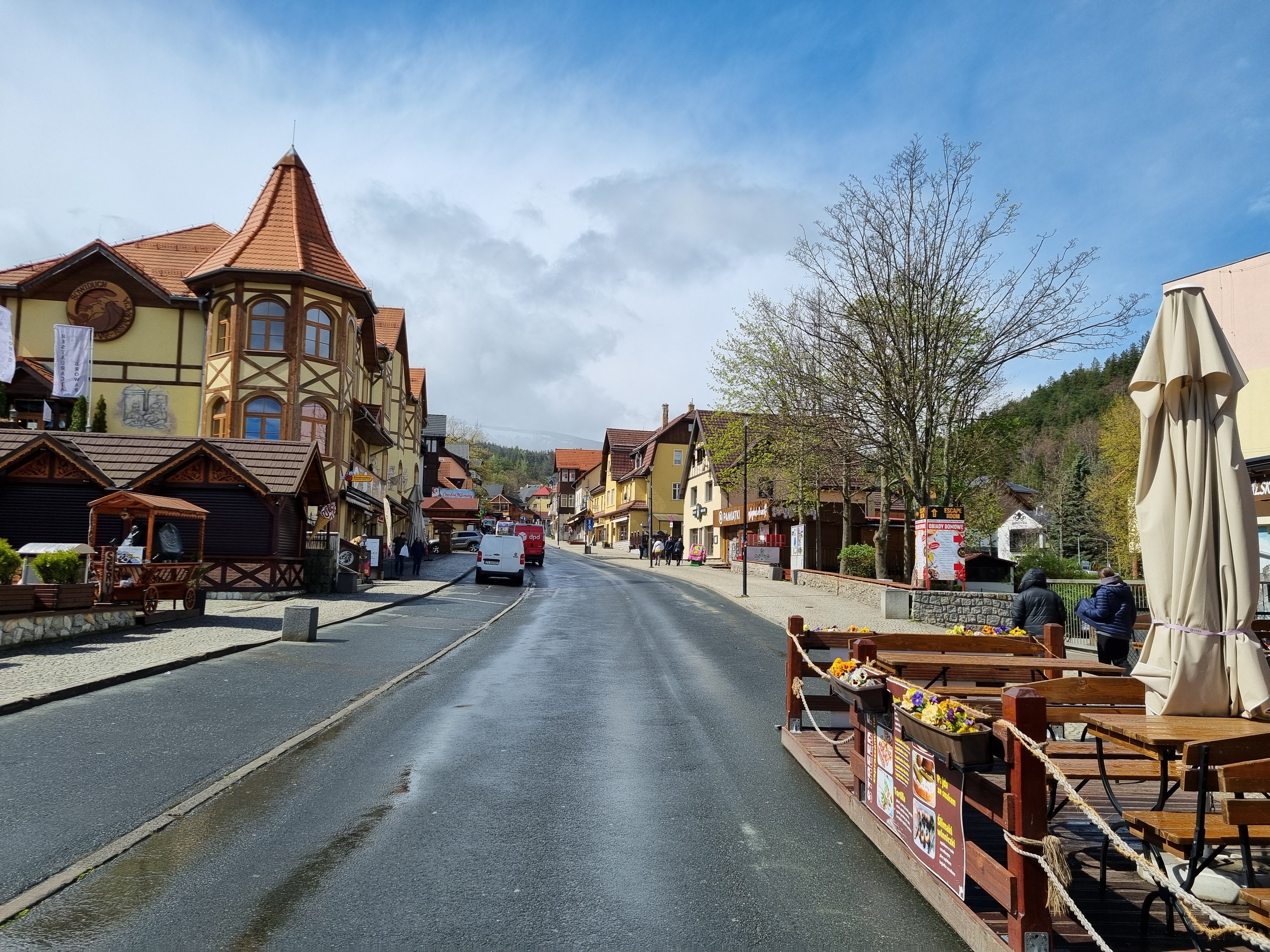
- Town centre

- Coat of arms

- Location within Poland
- Coordinates: 50°46′42″N 15°45′26″E
- Country: Poland
- Voivodeship: Lower Silesian
- County: Karkonosze
- Gmina: Karpacz (urban gmina)
- Town rights: 1959

Area
  - Total: 37.96 km^{2} (14.66 sq mi)
- Highest elevation: 885 m (2,904 ft)
- Lowest elevation: 480 m (1,570 ft)

Population (2019-06-30)
  - Total: 4,593
  - Density: 121.0/km^{2} (313.4/sq mi)
- Time zone: UTC+1 (CET)
  - Summer (DST): UTC+2 (CEST)
- Vehicle registration: DJE
- Website: www.karpacz.pl

Karpacz (Polish: [ˈkarpat͡ʂ], German: Krummhübel) is a spa town and ski resort in Karkonosze County, Lower Silesian Voivodeship, south-western Poland, and one of the most important centres for mountain hiking and skiing, including ski jumping. Its population is about 4,500. Karpacz is situated in the Karkonosze Mountains – a resort with increasing importance for tourism as an alternative to the Alps.

Karpacz is located at 480 to 885 metres (1,575–2,904 ft) above sea level. South of Karpacz on the border to the Czech Republic there is Mount Sněžka-Śnieżka (1,602 m (5,256 ft)). Since 2020, the town has been hosting the annual international Economic Forum.

== History ==
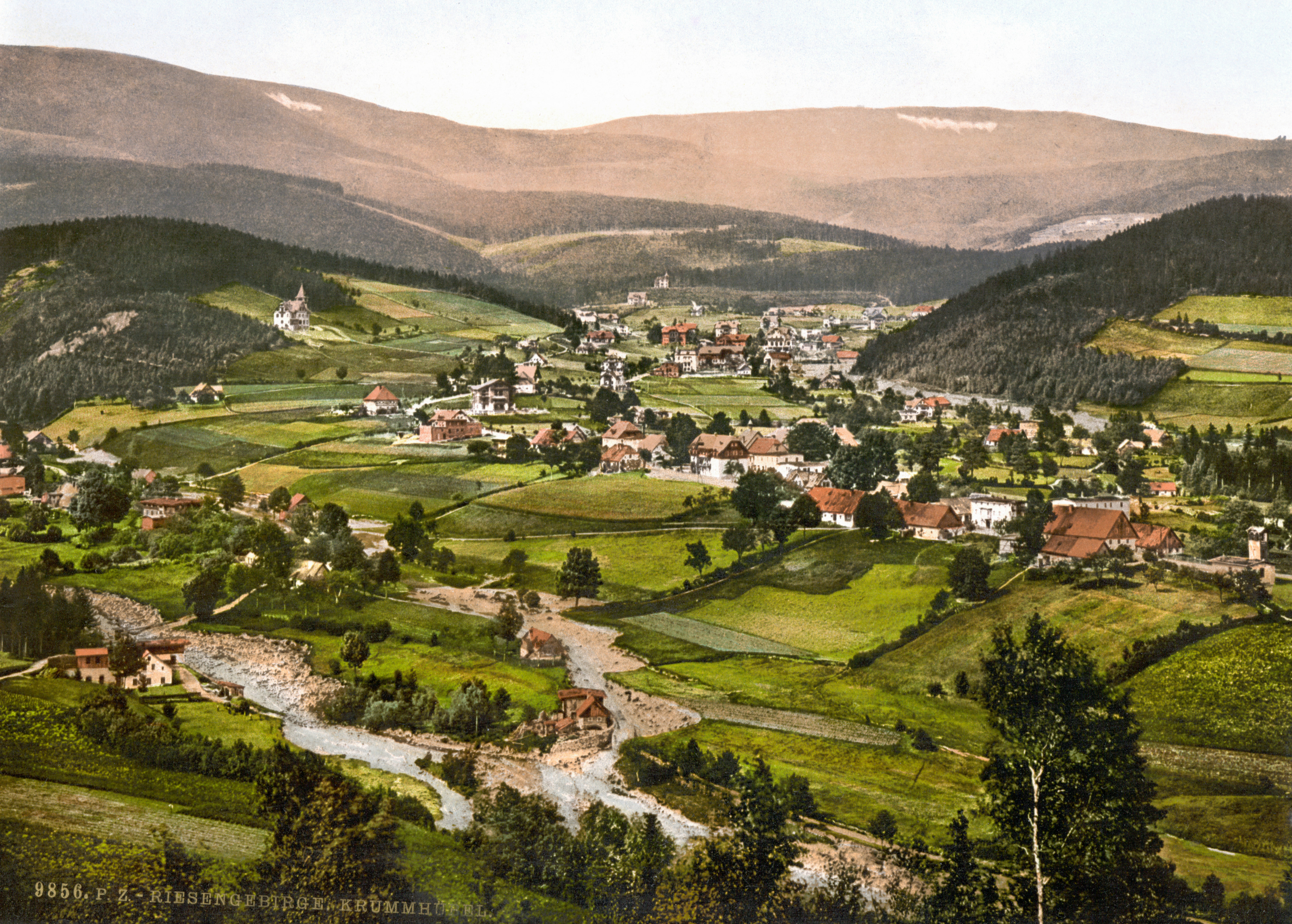
General view of the settlement in 1900

The area of present-day Karpacz was part of medieval Poland, after the establishment of the state in the 10th century. In the early 12th century the area was generally uninhabited, as mentioned in the oldest Polish chronicle Gesta principum Polonorum. The high elevations were covered by dense border forests (Silesian Przesieka) and formed a natural frontier between Silesia and Bohemia. From the 12th–13th centuries sporadic prospecting, including gold panning by Walloon miners, took place in the foothills, but no permanent settlements existed in the upper valleys. The first mention of permanent location within the current town limits is dated to the beginning of 15th century. After a flood destroyed the nearby village of Broniów (Bronysdorf) in 1412, its inhabitants resettled in the valley and established Twerchseifen (first recorded on 21 May 1418 as Twerchseyfen in a land sale document; later Querichseifen in 1491 and Querkseyffen in 1576). The region belonged politically to the Bohemian crown at that time; from 1526 it fell under Habsburg rule as part of the Kingdom of Bohemia. In 1599 Krummhübel is first mentioned by name as a separate settlement with 25 holdings, gradually becoming the main centre of the valley while Twerchseifen/Querichseifen remained its lower part. By 1600 the area featured limited forest clearance, scattered hamlets and small-scale mining and metallurgy support, but stayed sparsely populated. During the Thirty Years' War, many Protestants from Bohemia settled at the site of today's town.

In 1742 it was annexed by Prussia and, subsequently, it was part of unified Germany between 1871 and 1945. Since the construction of the settlement's first railway connection in 1895, its history was connected with the development of metallurgy industries and with the progress of tourism. After the defeat of Nazi Germany in World War II, in 1945 it became again part of Poland. In accordance to the Potsdam Agreement, the German population was expelled from the village between 1945 and 1947. The town was subsequently repopulated with Poles, who in turn were expelled from former eastern Poland annexed by the Soviet Union. Eventually renamed Karpacz in 1946, the settlement was granted town rights in 1959.

== Sights ==
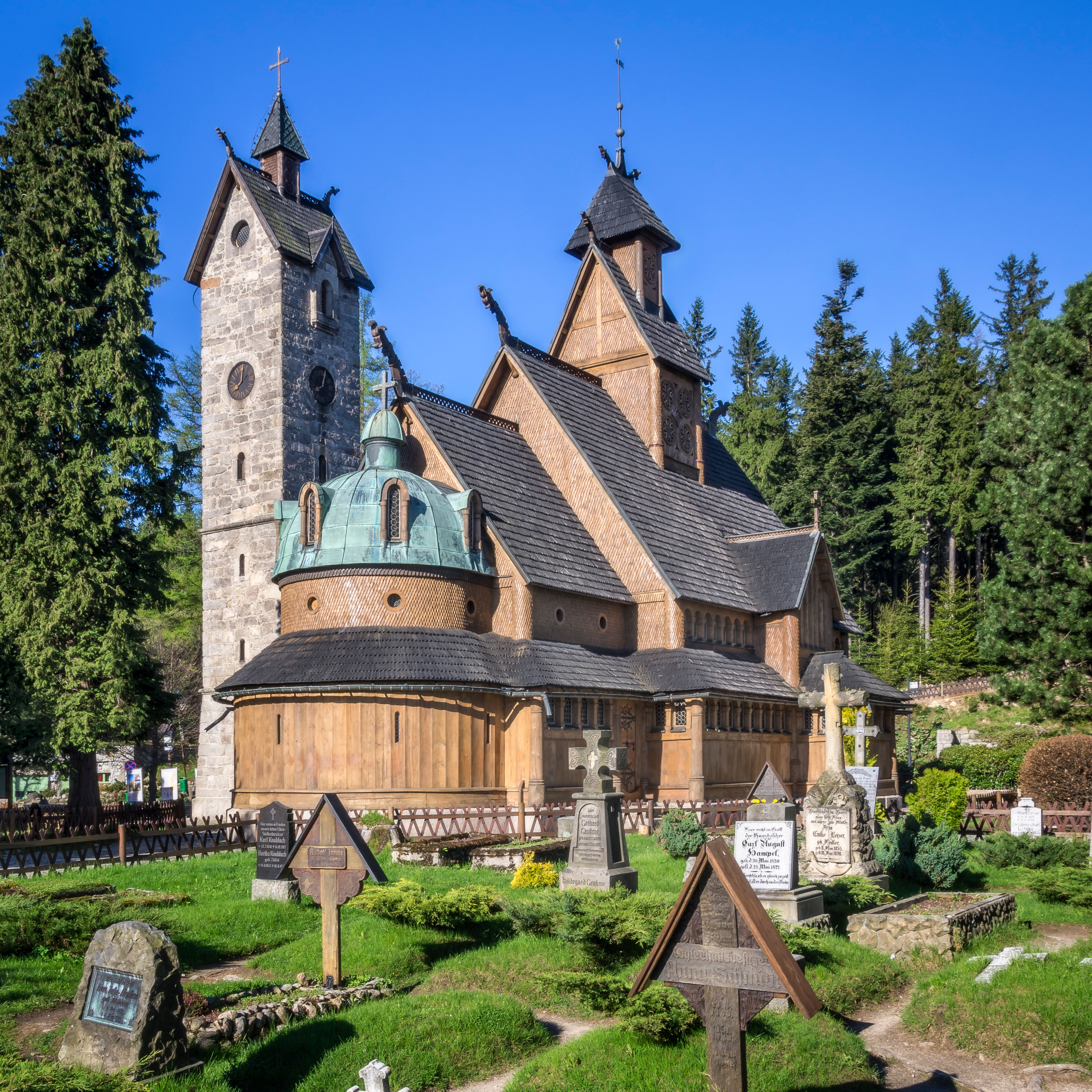
Vang Stave Church, 13th century

In Karpacz Górny a gravity hill is located where bottles appear to roll uphill. There is also a Norwegian stave church, moved here from Vang Municipality, Norway in the mid-19th century. Tourists very often choose to go hiking on local mountain trails.

There are two museums: the Museum of Sport and Tourism (Muzeum Sportu i Turystyki) and the Museum of Toys (Muzeum Zabawek), created in 1995, from Henryk Tomaszewski's collection. First seat of the latter was at 5 Karkonoska Street, in 2012 it was moved to new seat at former railway station, at 3 Kolejowa Street.

== Railway station ==
This station was created on 29 June 1895 (as Krummhübel), because of the touristic meaning of this town. In 1924-1925 a new station was built. In 1934 the railway line was electrified.

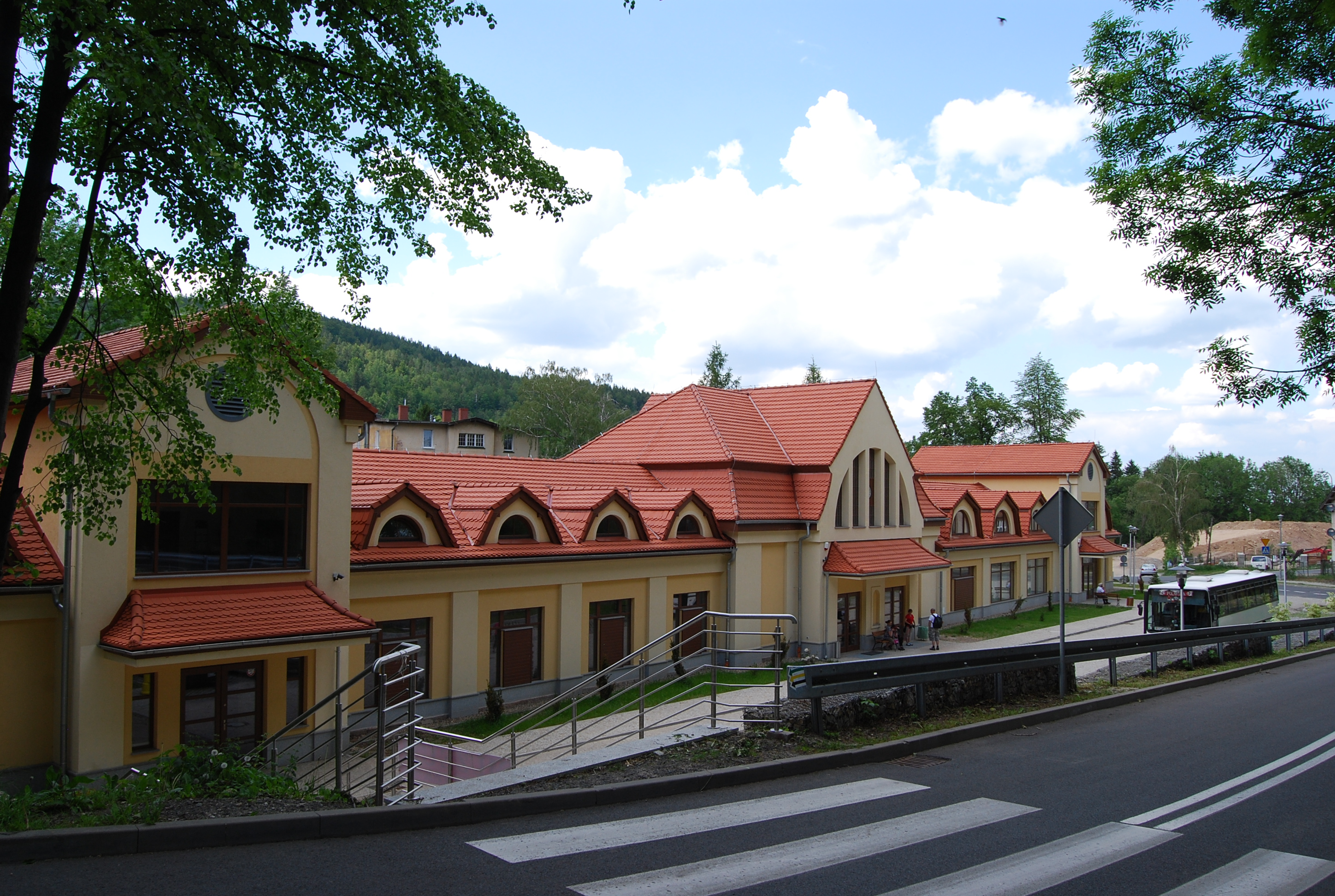
Karpacz railway station, Museum of Toys' and Municipal Library

After World War II, when Karpacz became a Polish town, for a short time this station was called Krzywa Góra (calque of former German name), later it was renamed to the new name of the town - Karpacz. The electrified infrastructure was disassembled as result of Polish-Soviet agreement.

After taking on of the line by Polish State Railways, exploration of it had local character.

On 23 November 2000 use of this line was suspended.

In 2008 building was taken on by town, since 2012 there is Museum of Toys and Municipal Library's seat.

On 15 June 2025 movement of trains was restored.

== People ==
- Max von Schenckendorff (1875–1943), German general in the Wehrmacht of Nazi Germany

== Twin towns – sister cities ==
Karpacz is twinned with:

- Kamenz, Germany
- Pec pod Sněžkou, Czech Republic
- Reichenbach, Germany
- Rewal, Poland

== Gallery ==
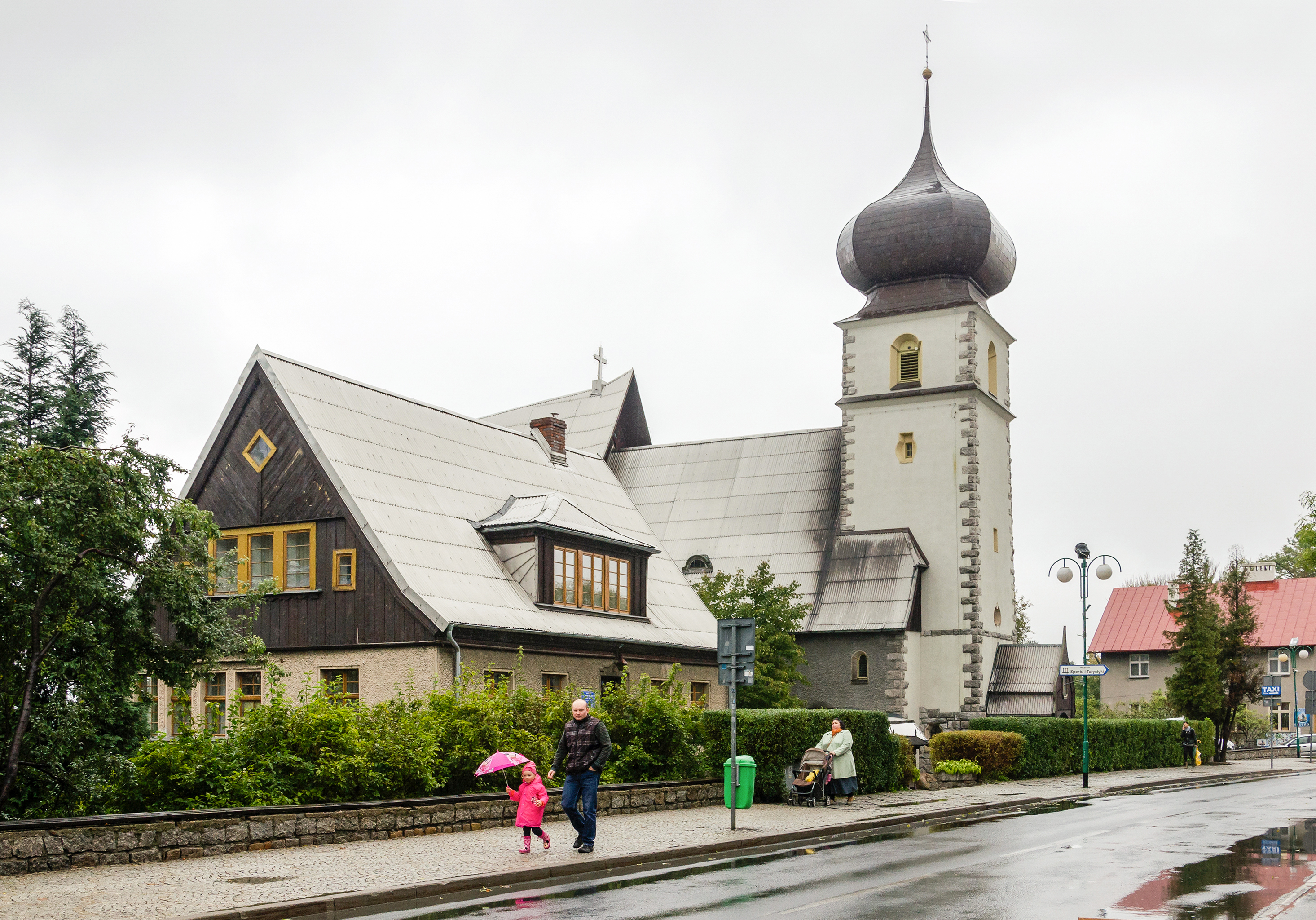
Visitation Church

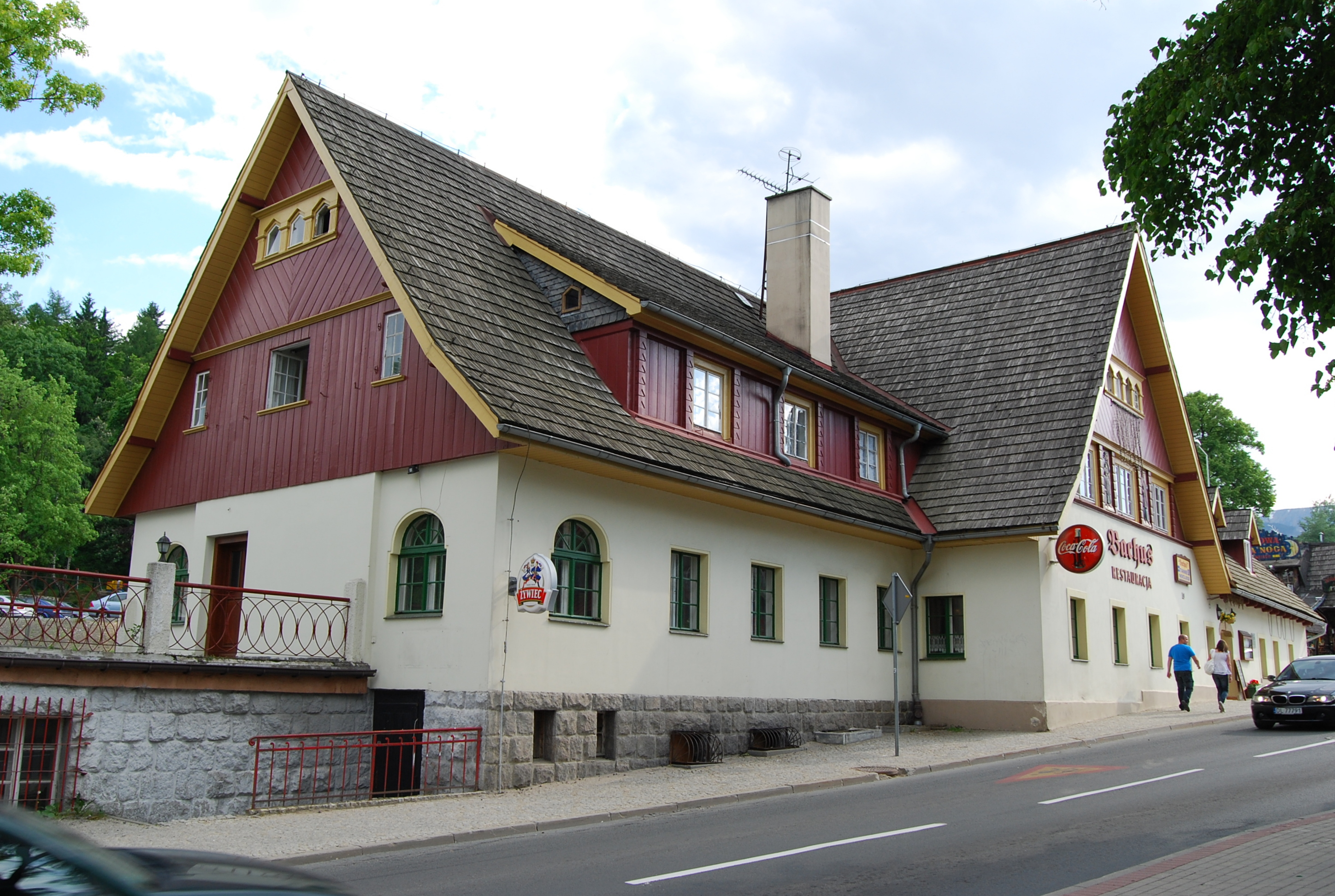
"Bachus" tavern

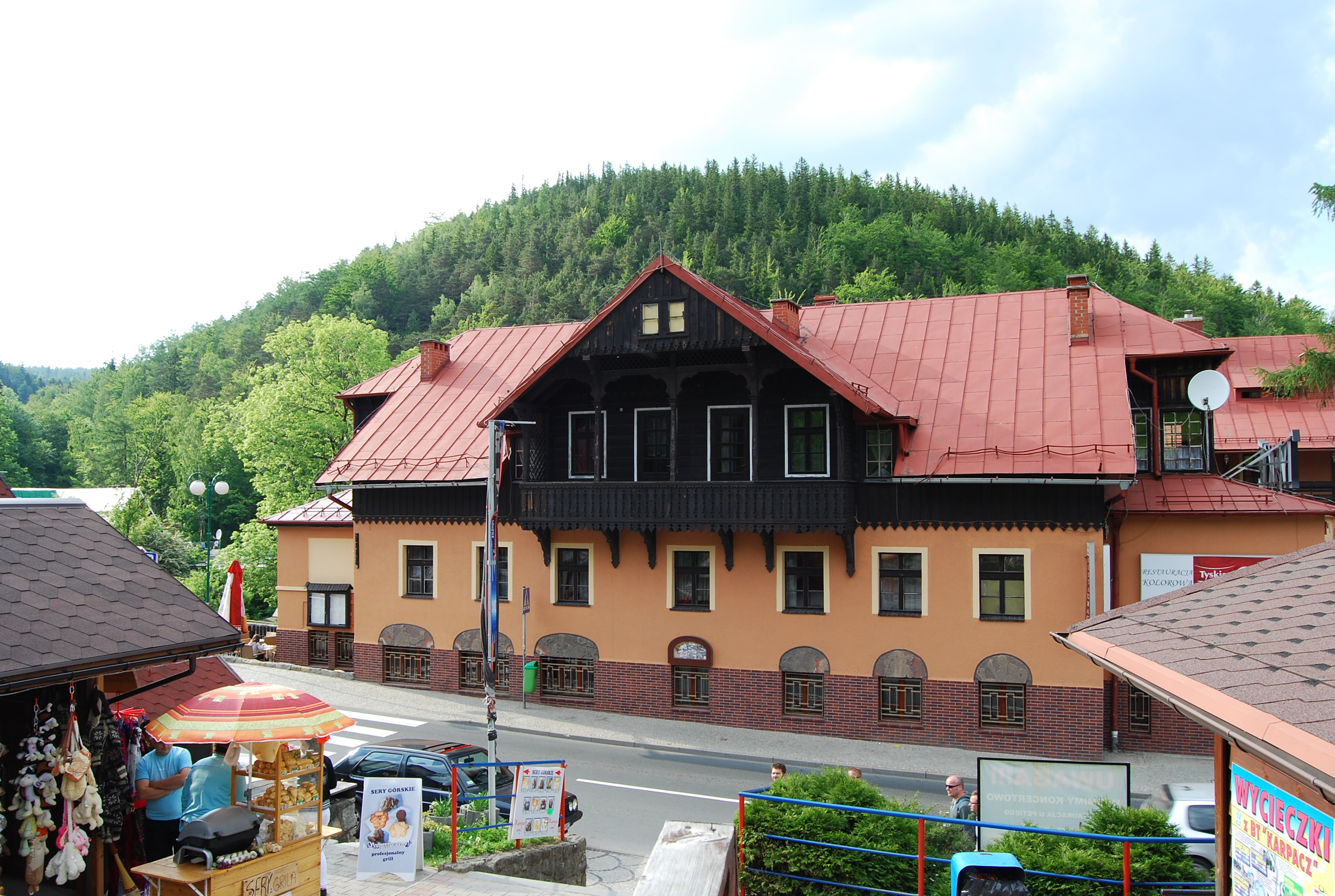
Town centre

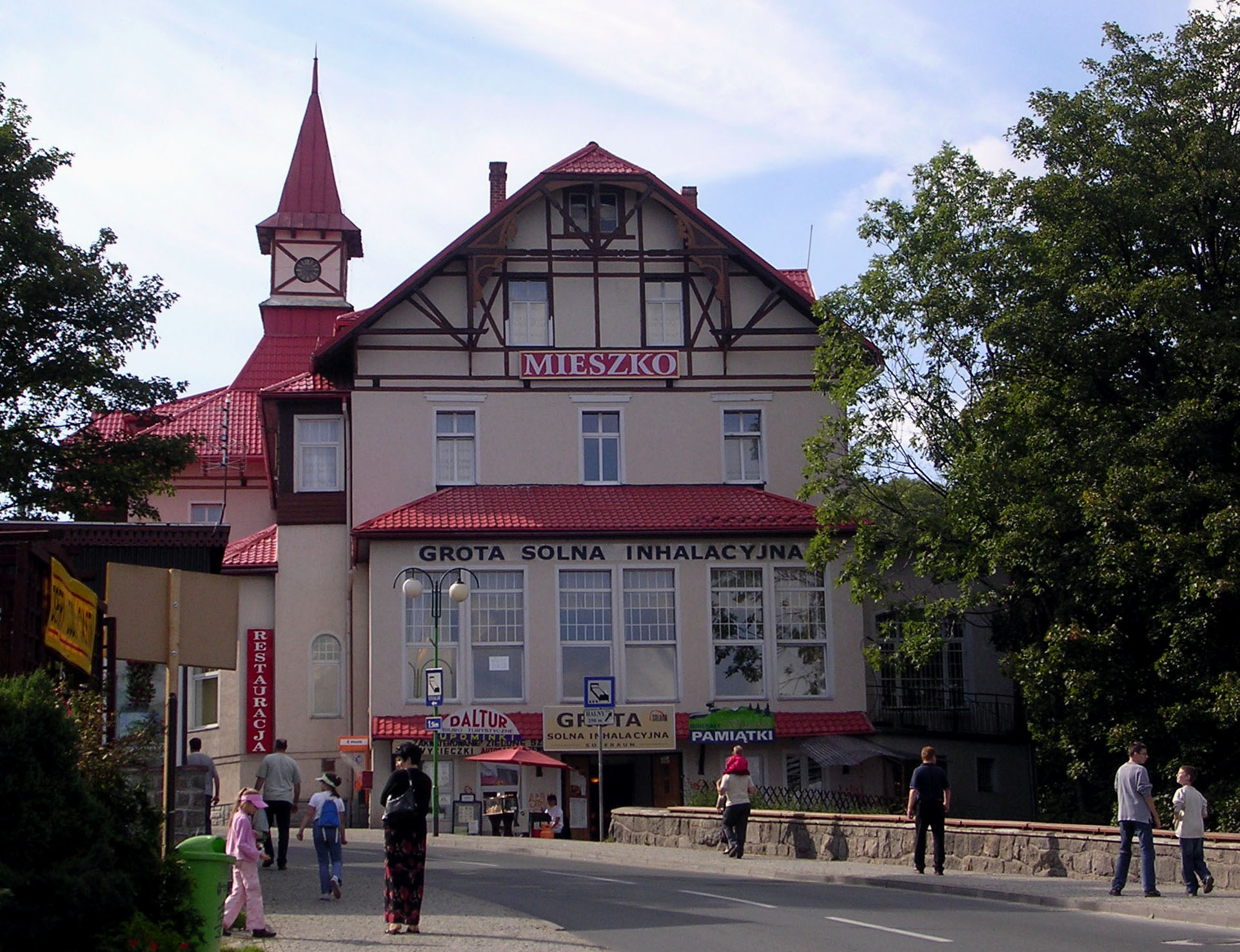
"Mieszko" guesthouse

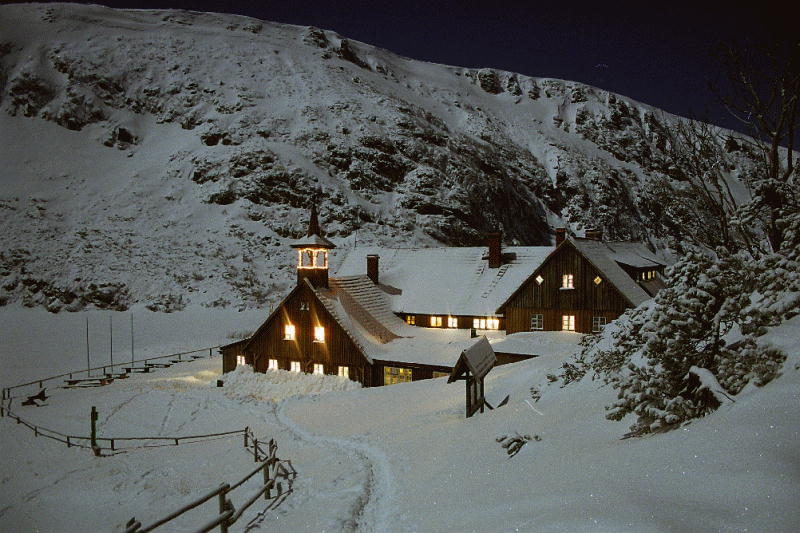
"Samotnia" mountain chalet

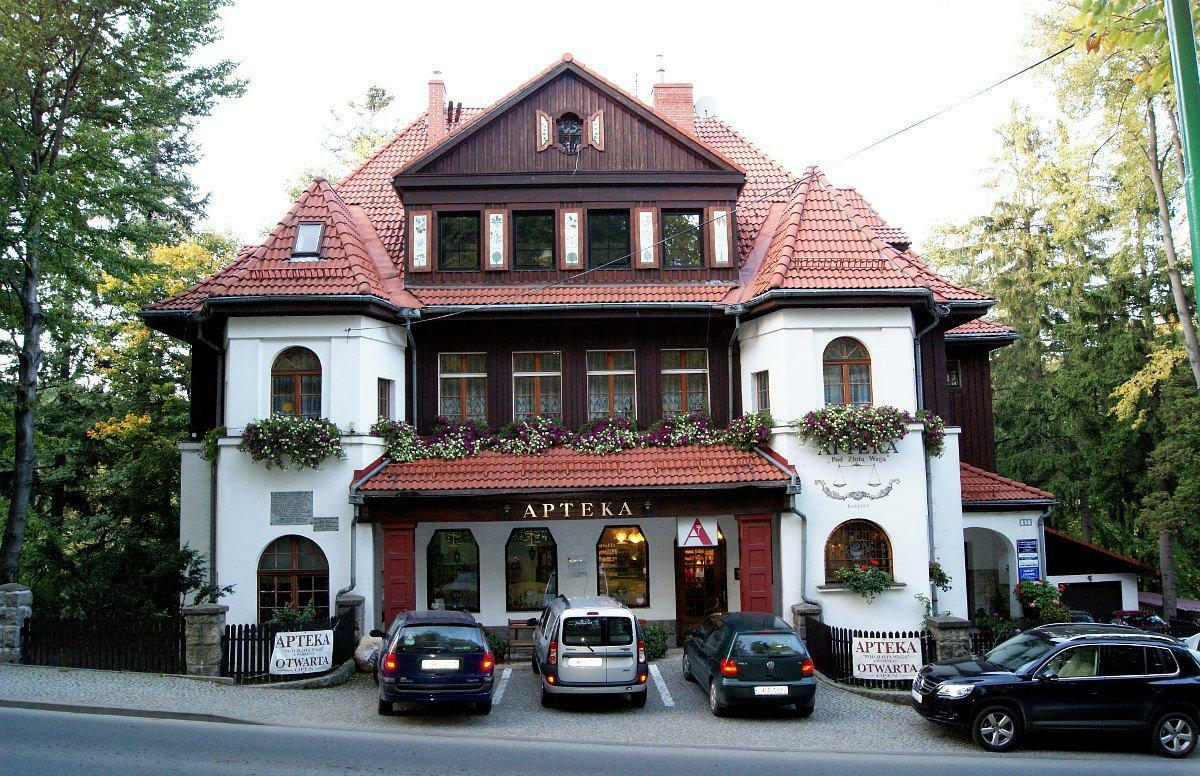
A historic villa

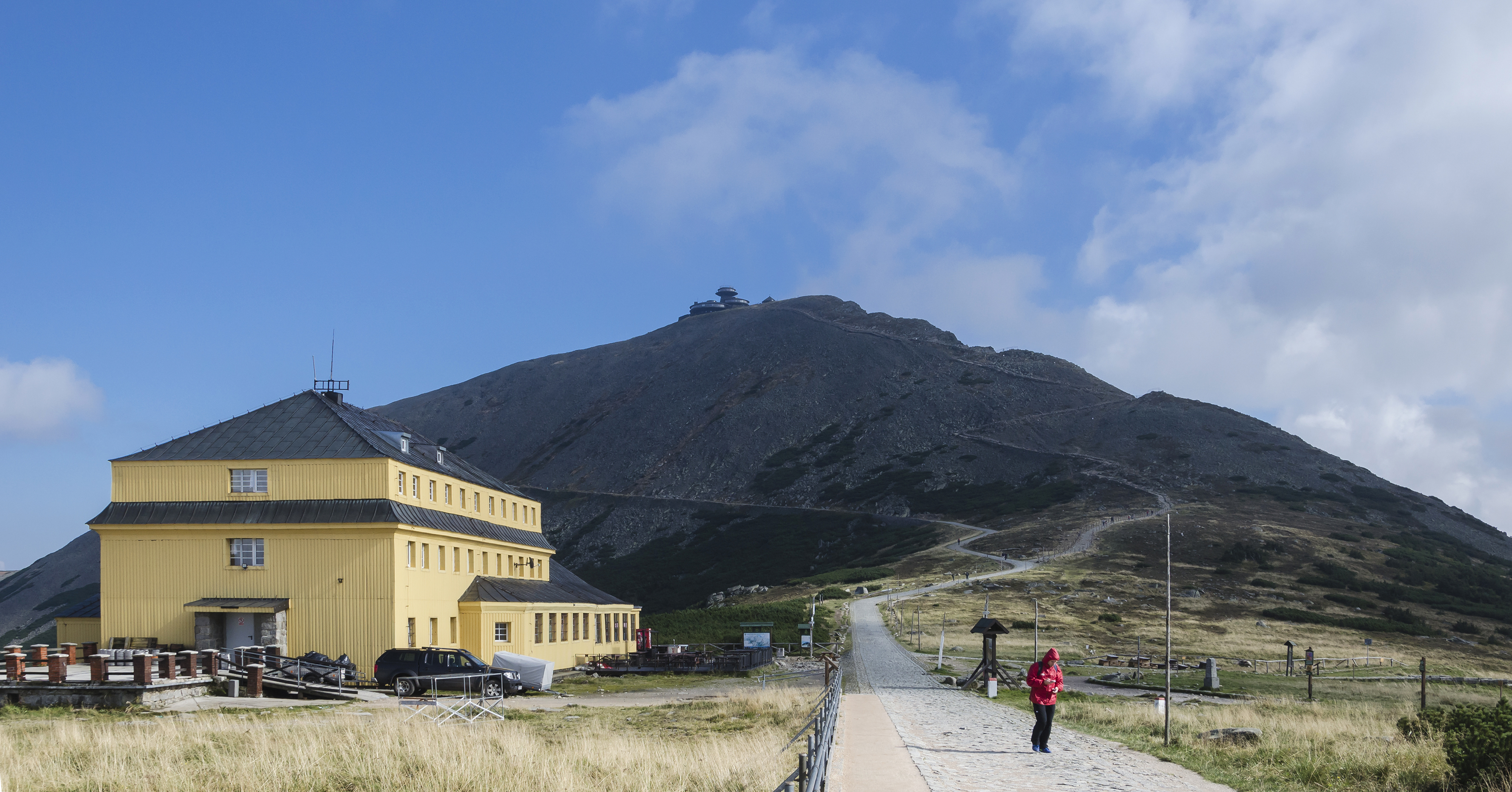
"Dom Śląski" mountain chalet

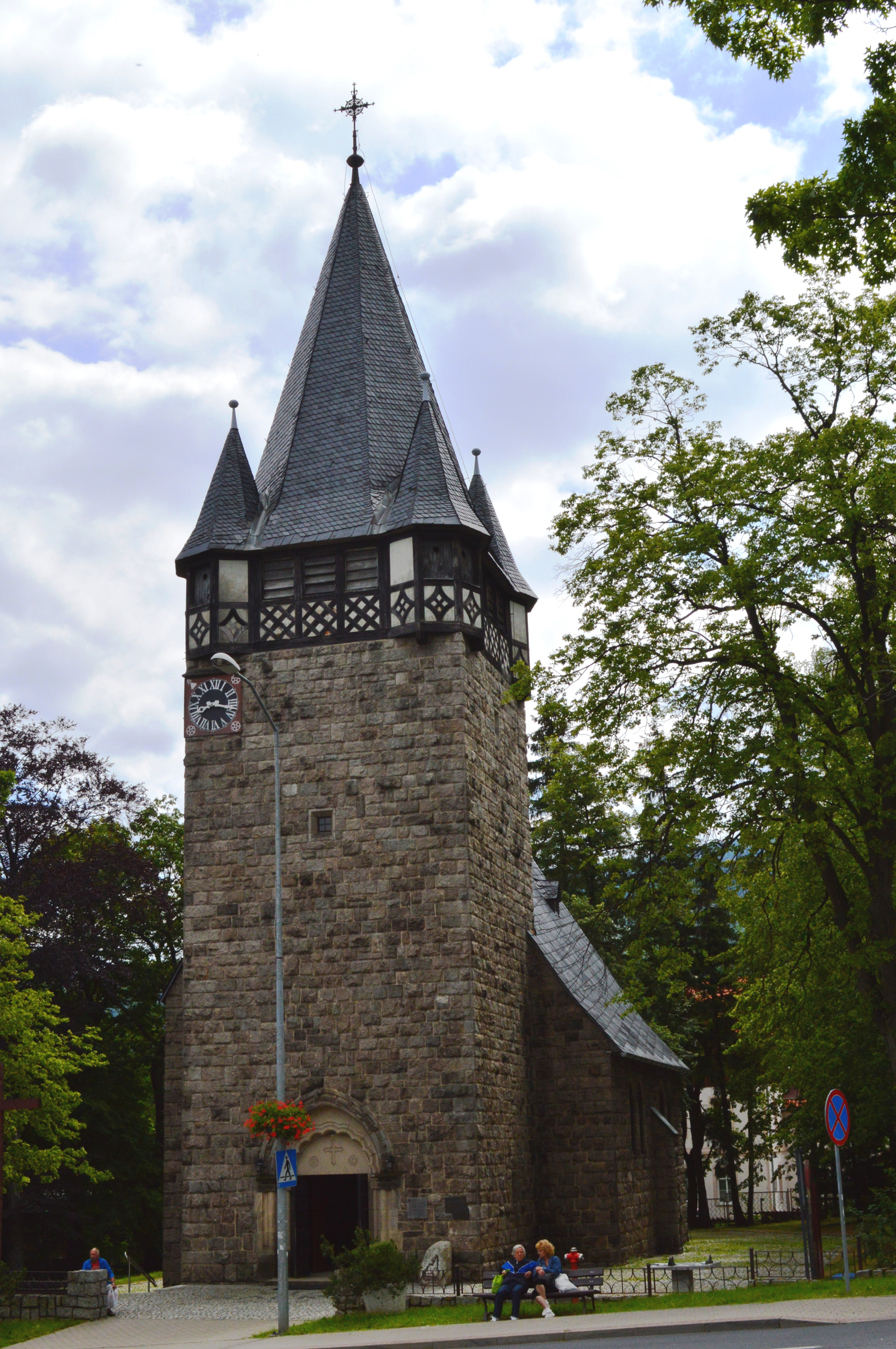
Sacred Heart Church

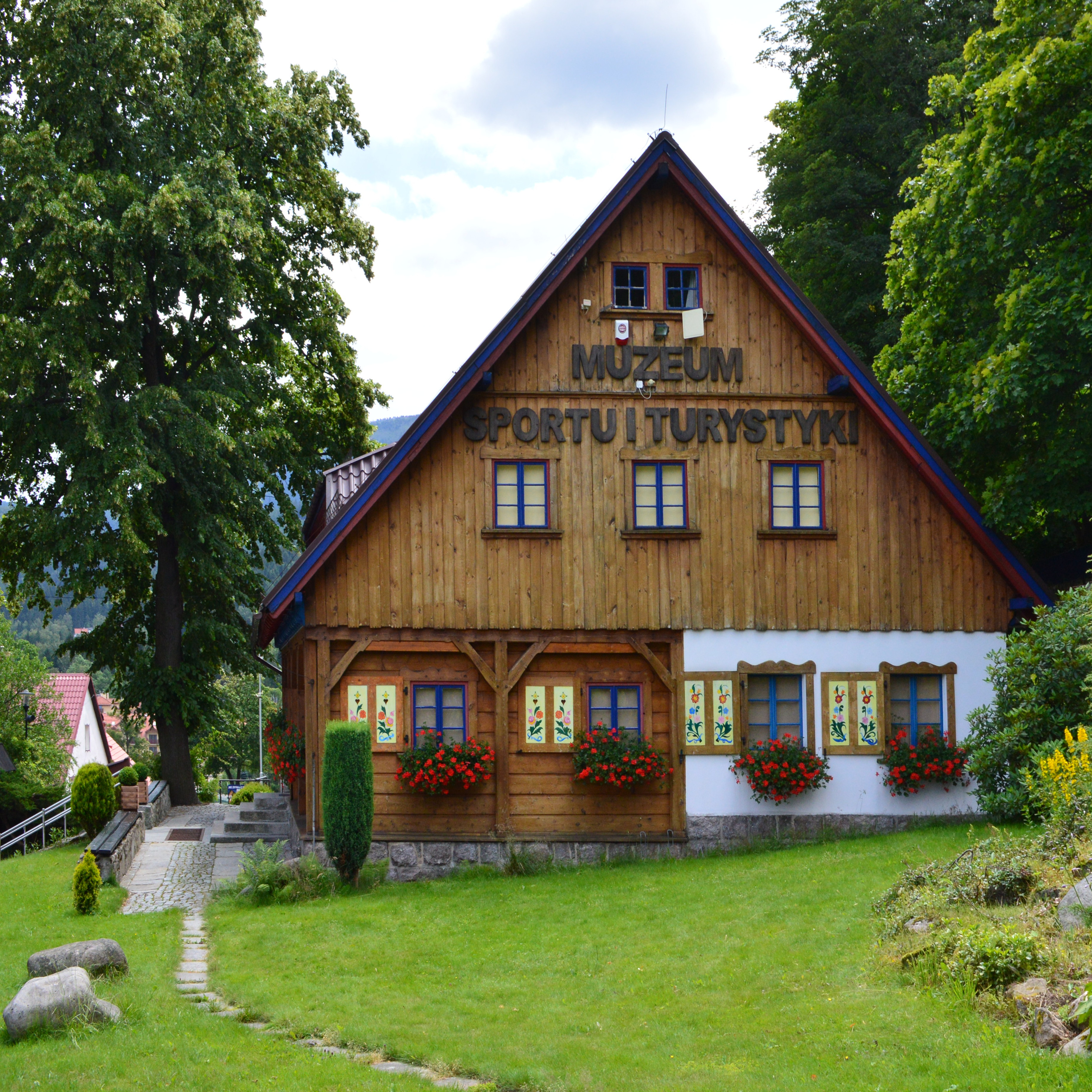
Museum of Sport and Tourism

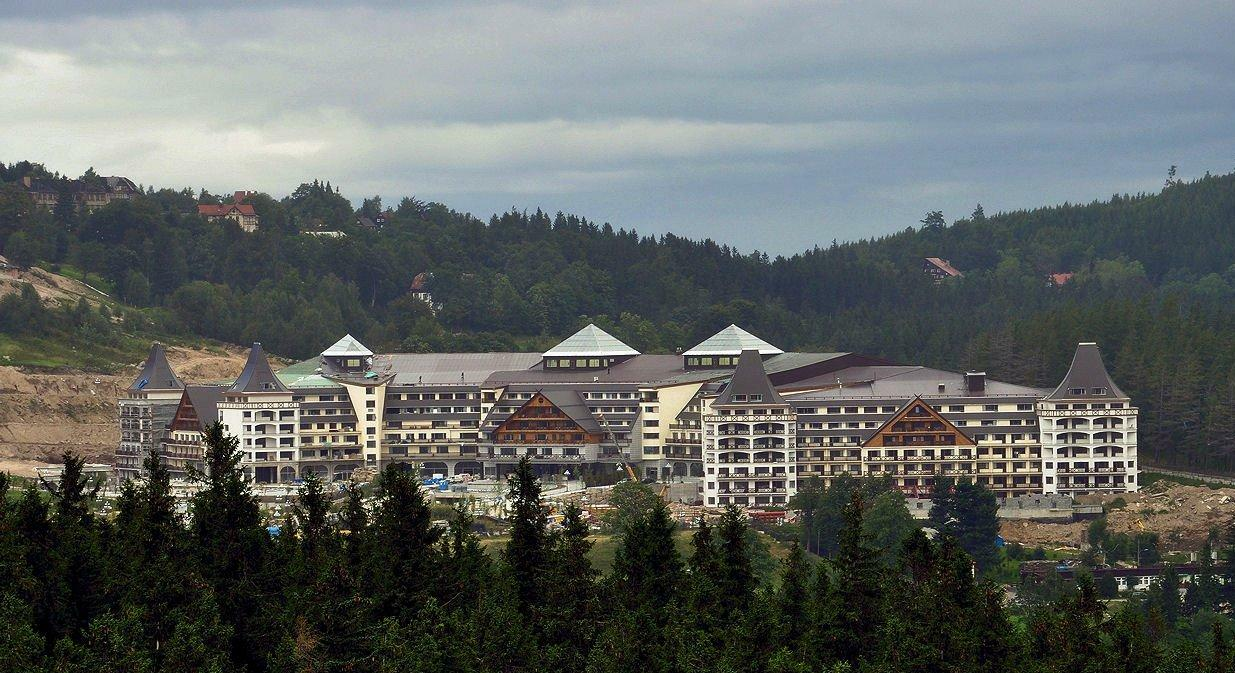
Gołębiewski Hotel

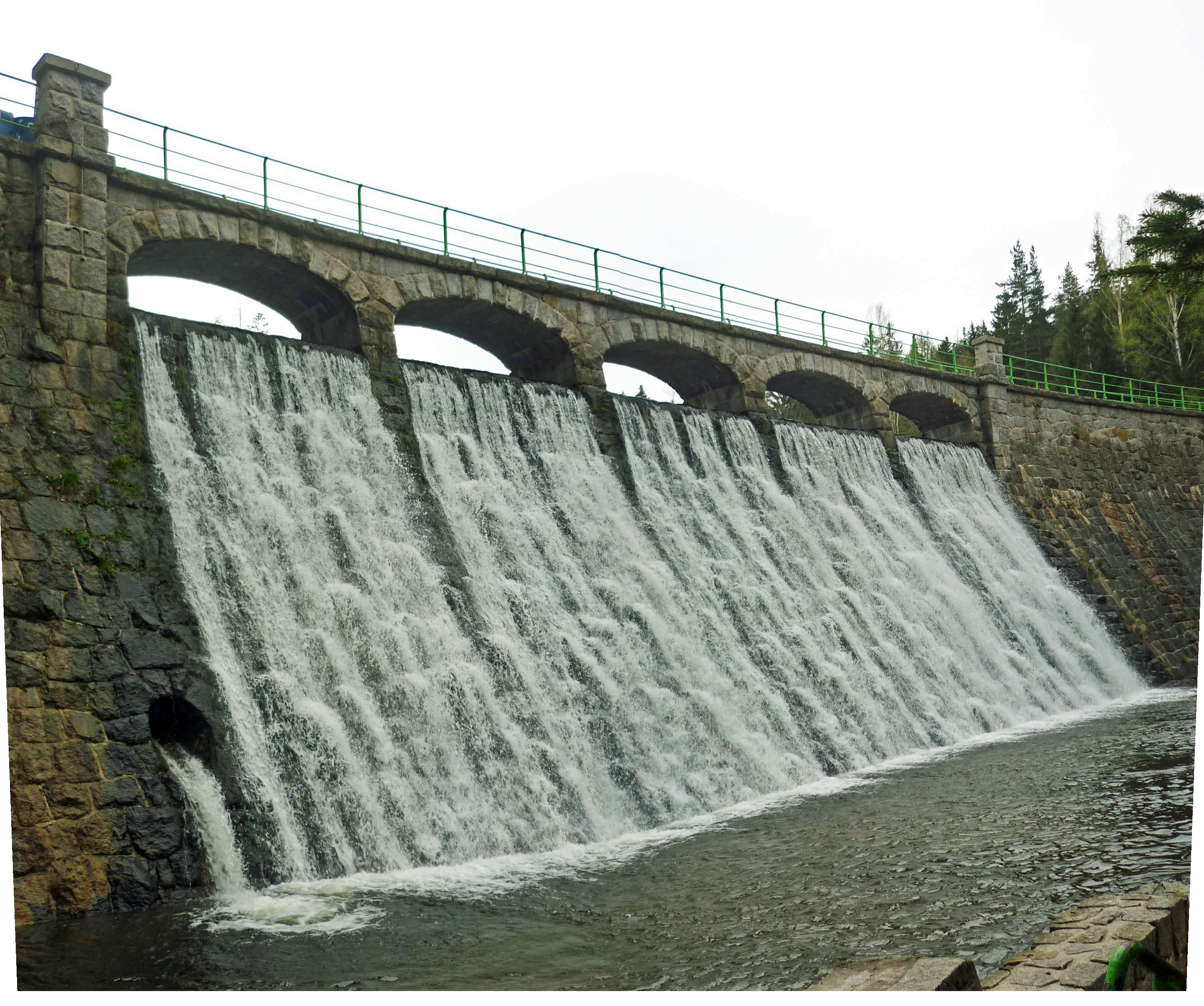
Łomnica dam

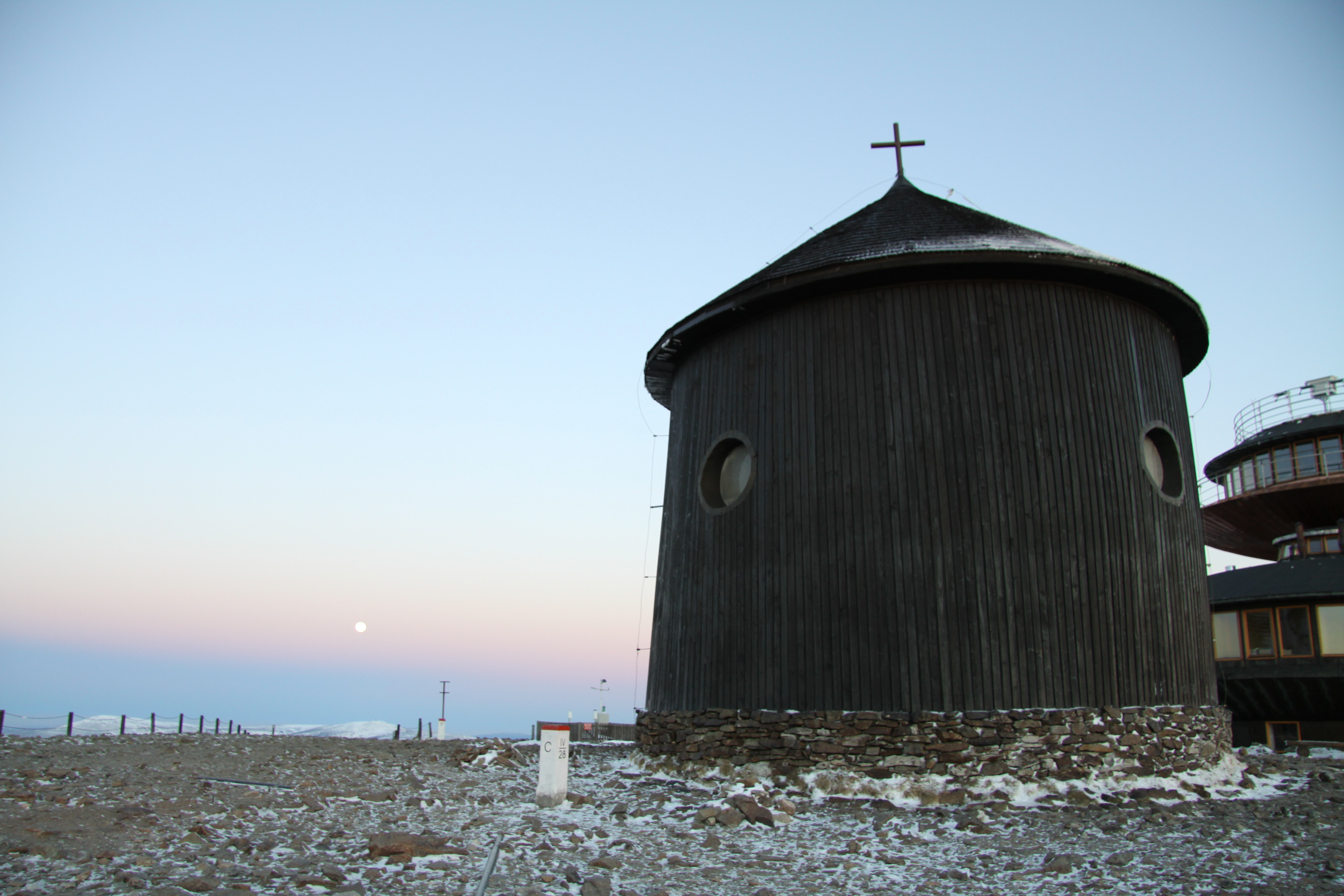
Chapel of Saint Lawrence on Sněžka-Śnieżka

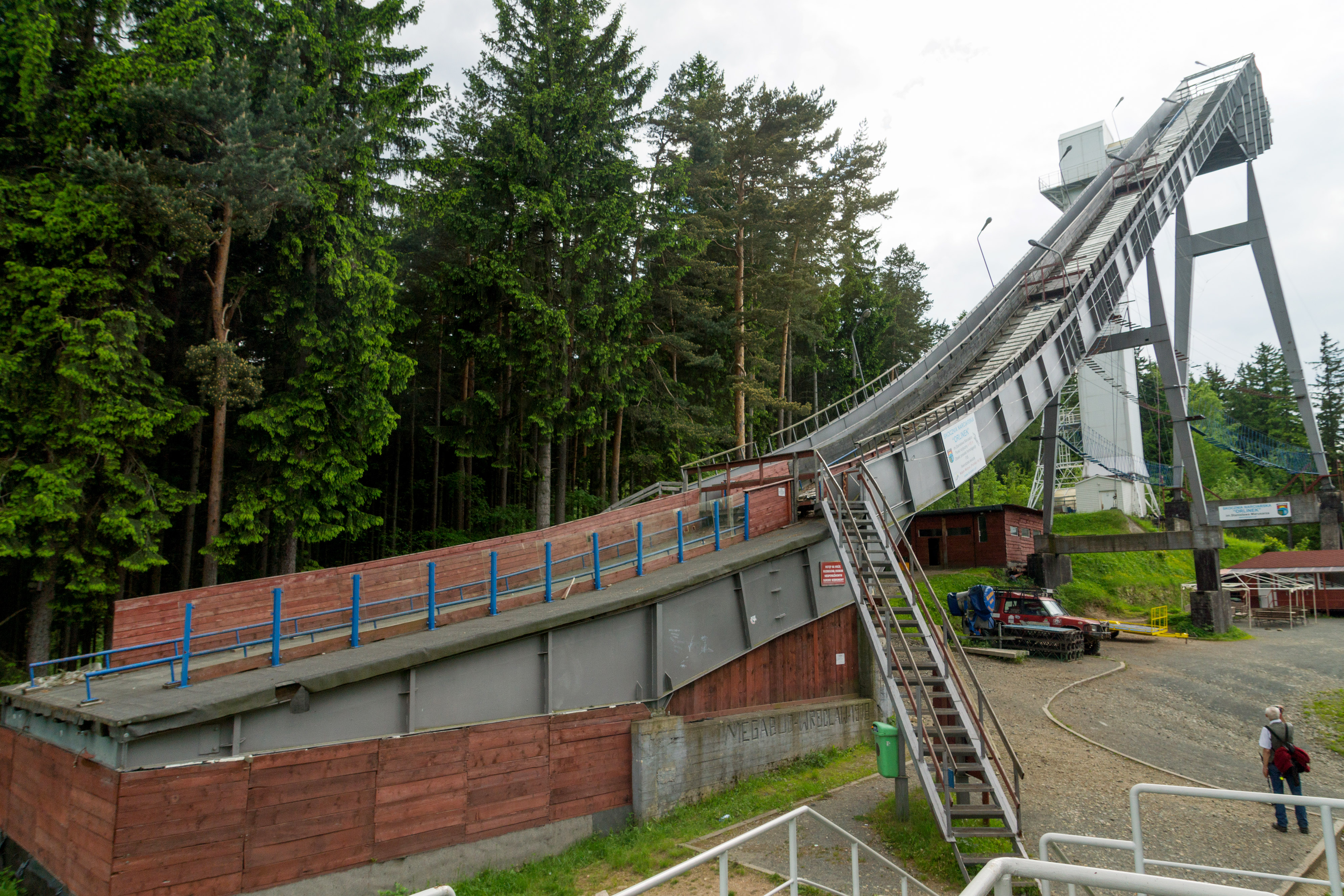
Orlinek ski jumping hill

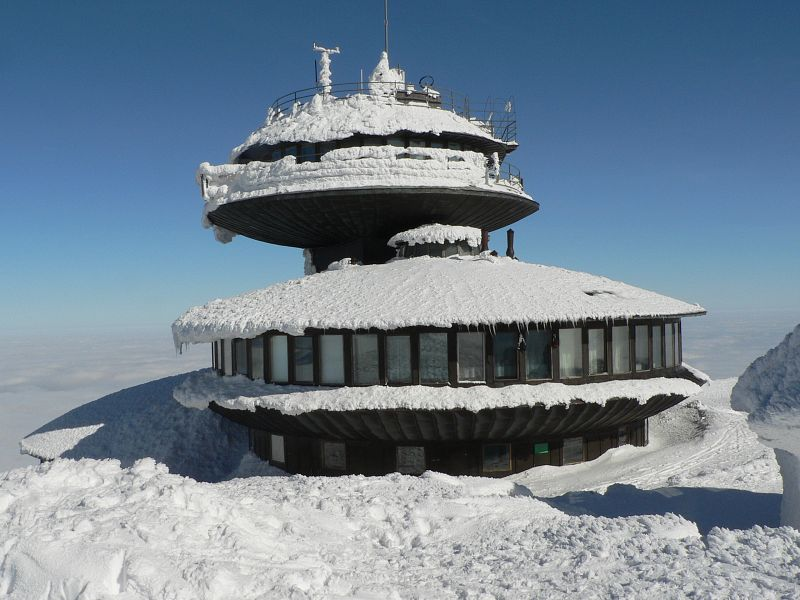
Tadeusz Hołdys High-Mountain Meteorological Observatory on Śnieżka
