= Reichenbach (Oberlausitz) =

- Town
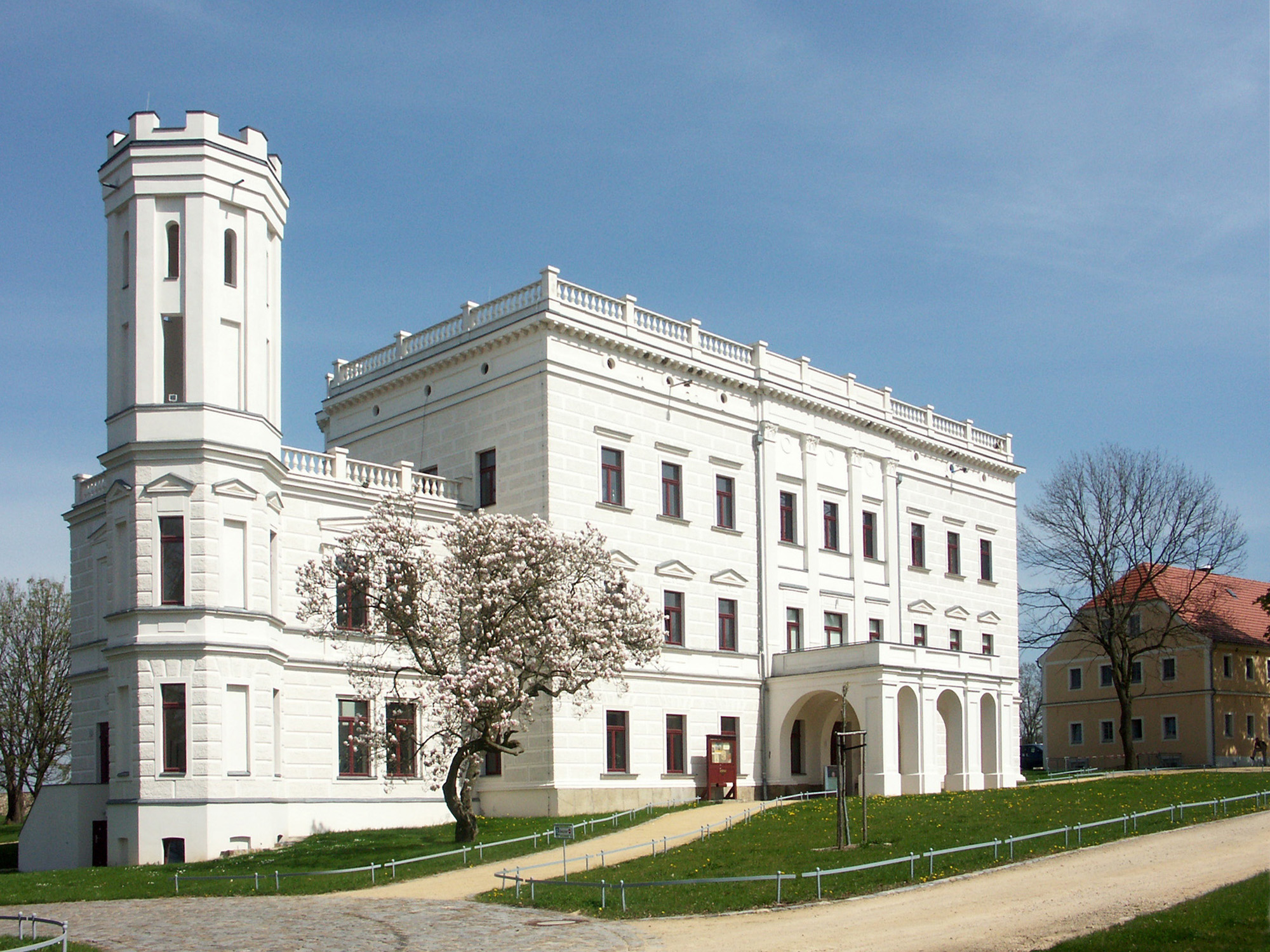
- Krobnitz Castle

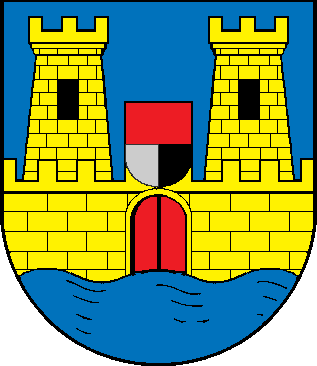
- Coat of arms

- Location of Reichenbach within Görlitz district
- Interactive map of Reichenbach
- Location within Germany Location within Saxony
- Coordinates: 51°8′30″N 14°48′0″E
- Country: Germany
- State: Saxony
- District: Görlitz

Government
  - Mayor (2022–29): Carina Dittrich

Area
  - Total: 62.64 km^{2} (24.19 sq mi)
- Elevation: 134 m (440 ft)

Population (2025-12-31)
  - Total: 4,520
  - Density: 72.2/km^{2} (187/sq mi)
- Time zone: UTC+01:00 (CET)
  - Summer (DST): UTC+02:00 (CEST)
- Postal codes: 02894
- Dialling codes: 035828
- Vehicle registration: GR, LÖB, NOL, NY, WSW, ZI
- Website: www.reichenbach-ol.com

Reichenbach/O.L. (German pronunciation: [ˈʁaɪçn̩bax]; full German name: Reichenbach/Oberlausitz; Upper Sorbian: Rychbach; Polish: Rychbach) is a town in the Görlitz district, in eastern Saxony, in eastern Germany. It is located 13 km west of Görlitz.

== History ==
The settlement was first mentioned in 1238, when it was part of the Kingdom of Bohemia. In 1319 it passed to the Duchy of Jawor, the southwesternmost duchy of fragmented Piast-ruled Poland, and later on it was also ruled by Bohemian, Hungarian, Saxon and Polish monarchs. In 1815, it was annexed by Prussia. From 1816 to 1919, Reichenbach was part of the Province of Silesia, from 1919 to 1938 of the Province of Lower Silesia, again from 1938 to 1941 of the Province of Silesia and again from 1941 to 1945 of the Province of Lower Silesia. From 1945 to 1952 it was part of Saxony and from 1952 to 1990 of the Bezirk Dresden of East Germany. Schloss Krobnitz, an estate which belonged to Prussian Minister of War Albrecht von Roon, lies in Reichenbach.

== Broadcasting station ==
There was a radio broadcasting station at the northern edge of Reichenbach since 1937. Originally built as a free-standing wooden tower, it was replaced after World War II with a steel construction, which was renewed in 1999. The Reichenbach transmitter broadcast the regional station MDR Info at 1188 kHz with an output of 3 kilowatts. The transmitter was taken out of operation in May 2013, and subsequently demolished.
