= Tadeusz Hołdys High-Mountain Meteorological Observatory on Śnieżka =

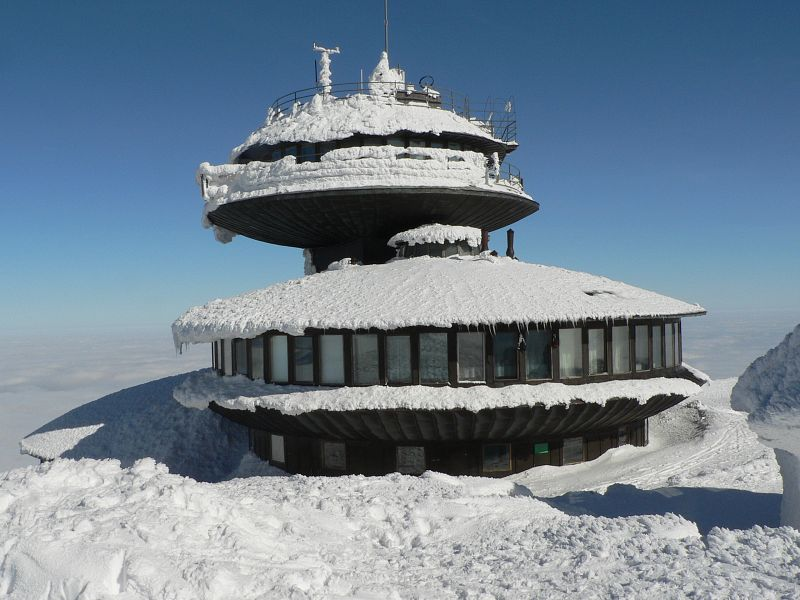
- Tadeusz Hołdys High-Mountain Meteorological Observatory on Śnieżka.
- Location: Karpacz, Karkonosze County, Lower Silesian Voivodeship, Poland
- Coordinates: 50°44′N 15°44′E
- Altitude: 1,602 m (5,256 ft)
- Established: 5 July 1900
- Website: sniezka.karpacz.pl/obserwatorium_na_sniezce/
- Location of Tadeusz Hołdys High-Mountain Meteorological Observatory on Śnieżka
- Related media on Commons

The Tadeusz Hołdys High-Mountain Meteorological Observatory on Śnieżka (previously used name: Tadeusz Hołdys High-Mountain Observatory on Śnieżka) - an institution of the Institute of Meteorology and Water Management, located on Śnieżka - the highest summit of the Karkonosze and the whole Sudetes, at an altitude of 1602 m. Since 1985 the observatory has been named after Tadeusz Hołdys.

== Beginnings of observation ==
The history of meteorological observations on Śnieżka dates back to 1824. At first, they were conducted on an irregular basis in the St. Lawrence's chapel, which was adapted as a tourist hostel. In 1889, on the initiative of Johann Pohl, a 2nd class meteorological station was set up in the shelter on the Silesian side.

== Old observatory building ==
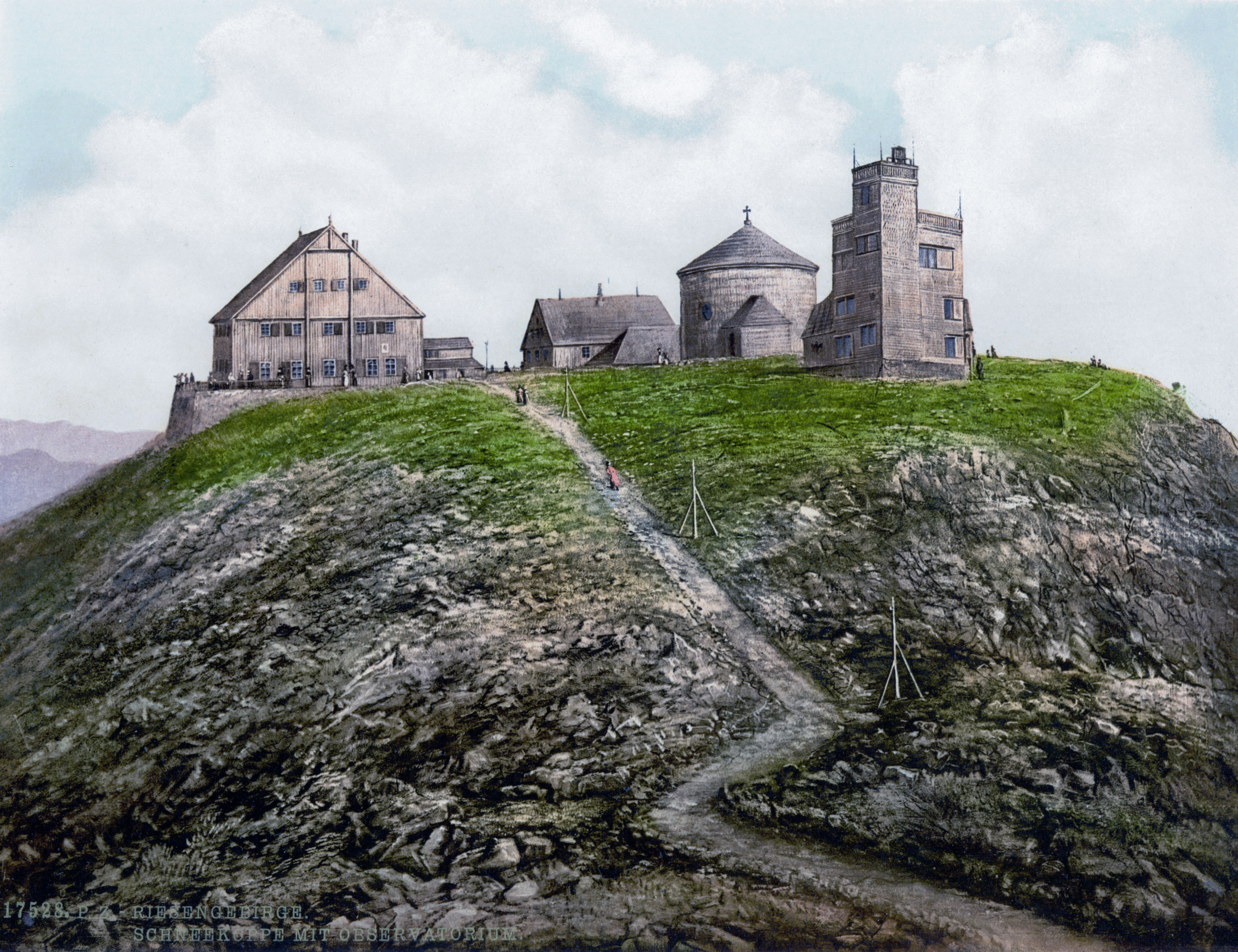
Old observatory building around 1900 (first on the right)

In 1897 a project to build a separate observatory building was developed. The construction started two years later. The building was used for meteorological measurements since 5 July 1900 as a first-class meteorological observatory. It had a form of a three-storey tower 16 meters high with two small terraces on the roof. The structural skeleton of the building consisted of oak and larch logs, fastened together with bolts up to 4 meters long. The skeleton was filled with 18 cm thick asbestos-cork cubes, covered with plaster-soaked jute. The outer insulation layer consisted of boards and tar paper, while the inside was covered with fiberboard. The tower was stabilized by a layer of stones weighing 5 tons, placed under the terrace. The entire structure was anchored in the rocky ground with steel cables. The building was also protected against lightning by three lightning conductors. Measurements were conducted on the terraces and in the meteorological garden, located on the Austro-Hungarian side.

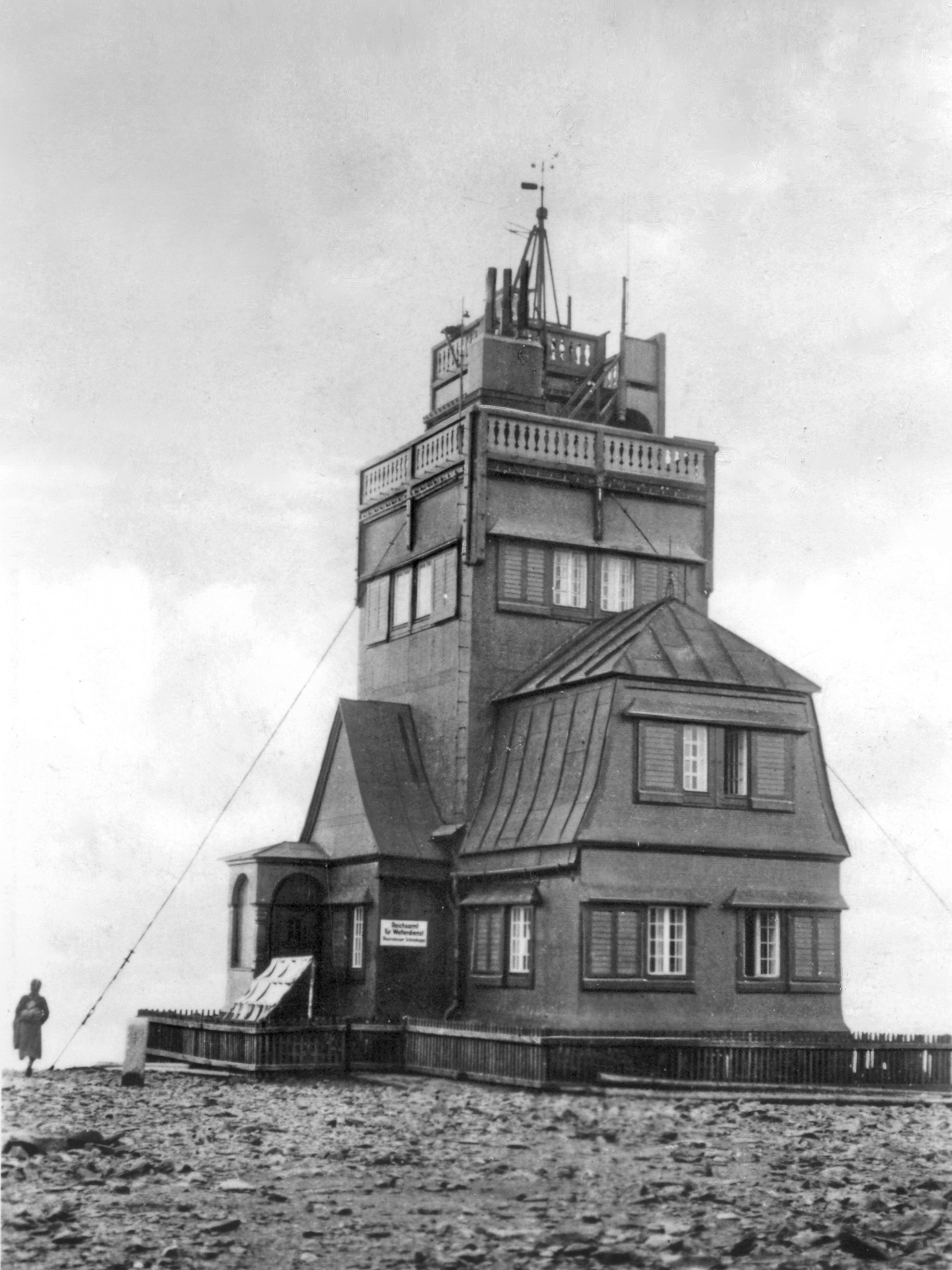
The old observatory in 1942

The building survived the First and Second World War. On July 16, 1945, the Polish meteorological service began to conduct observations in the building. The building was subjected to difficult weather conditions on the summit. The building was repeatedly renovated. In mid-50s it was decided to build a new observatory, the construction started in the second half of the 1960s. Starting from 1 January 1975 comparative observations were carried out in the old and in the new observatory. Measurements in the old building were stopped on 23 October 1976. There were plans to dismantle the building and transport it to another location, where it would serve as a museum dedicated to meteorology. In 1978 the Institute of Meteorology and Water Management donated the building to the town of Karpacz for "a symbolic one zloty". It was supposed to be moved in the vicinity of the Museum of Sport and Tourism, but this plan was never carried out. In 1989, the building, which had been deteriorating for 13 years, was demolished in a way that does not provide for its reconstruction.

== New observatory building ==
The new observatory building was erected between 1966 and 1974 (construction was completed on 13 November 1974), a few metres to the west of the site of the former Polish (and until 1945 German) mountain shelter on Śnieżka. The structure was made of reinforced concrete, steel, aluminum (including the outer covering) and glass. The architects who designed the building were Witold Lipiński, PhD and Waldemar Wawrzyniak, from the Wrocław University of Technology, who won the SARP competition for the design of the building.

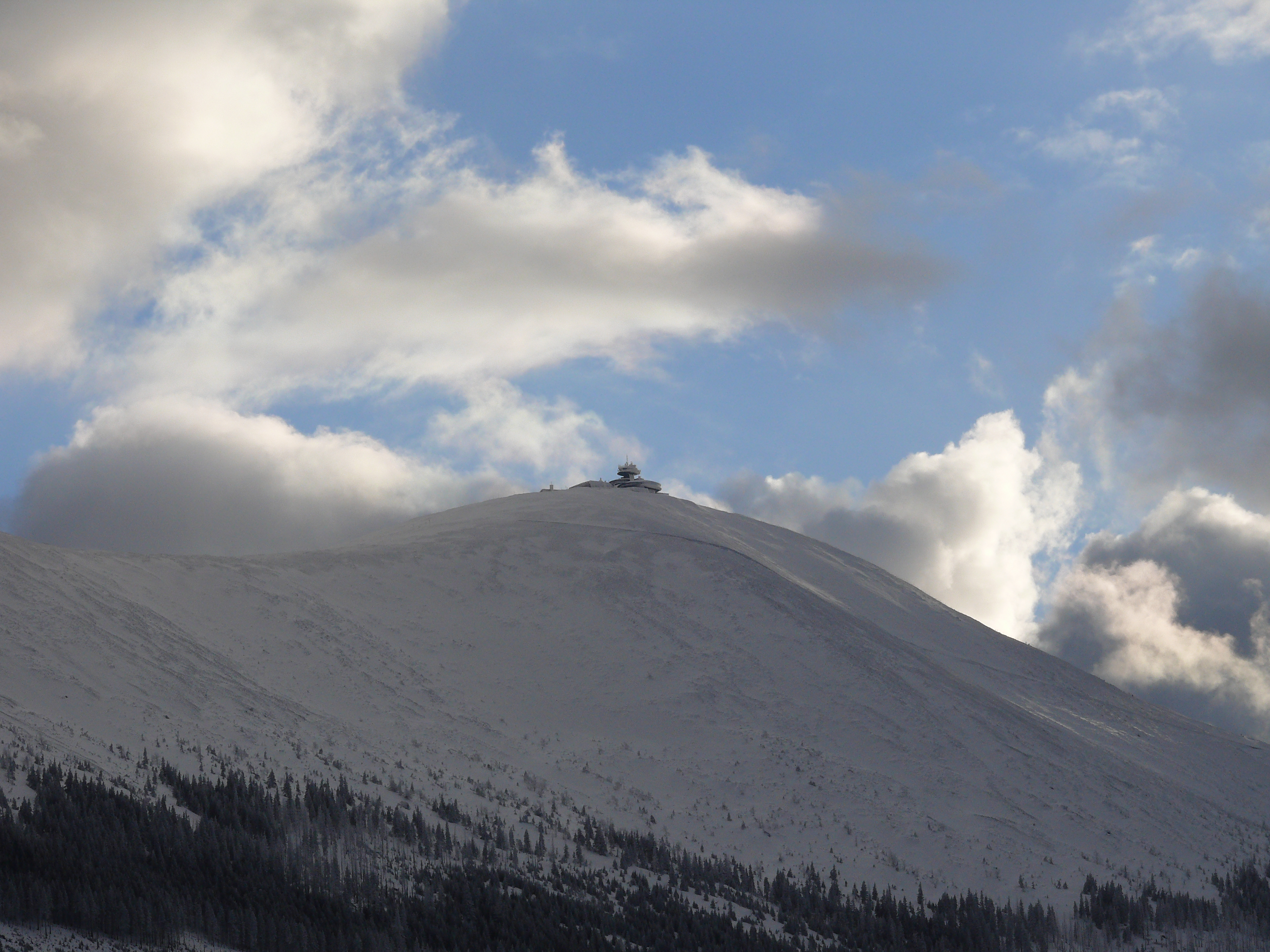
The new observatory - view from Krucze Skały in Karpacz

The building was constructed using three interconnected disc-shaped blocks (sometimes also called plates or saucers, due to their resemblance to flying saucers). Witold Lipiński explained the shape of the building as follows: „In the 1950s there was a lot of talk about unidentified flying objects, and I was always fascinated by curved lines and spherical spaces - so I decided that the observatory on Śnieżka would be disc-shaped”. The structure of the discs is a steel truss, supported centrally on a concrete foundation. The building was intended to replace the old observatory and the old hostel from 1862, due to the poor technical condition of the buildings and the increase in tourist traffic. Ultimately, however, no hotel function was provided, only the observatory and a restaurant were designed. Construction of the new observatory building received a distinction at the World Architecture Exhibition in Mexico. Observations in the new building began on 1 January 1975. The Observatory was managed by Tadeusz Hołdys and Józef Pawłowski (in the years 1983–2000). Current manager is Piotr Krzaczkowski (2000).

On November 1, 2015, the Institute of Meteorology and Water Management closed the restaurant section until further notice. The roof covering was damaged in February 2020 due to high winds. In June 2020, the building was listed in the Register of Historic Monuments.

== Construction of the new observatory ==
=== The upper disk ===
The highest disk - reaching an altitude of 1620 m above sea level - houses the meteorological observatory. It has the smallest diameter - about 13 m. It rests on a reinforced concrete shaft, above the other discs. It is distinguished from the other disks by an external gallery running around it and a terrace intended for taking measurements on the roof. It has windows around the entire perimeter.

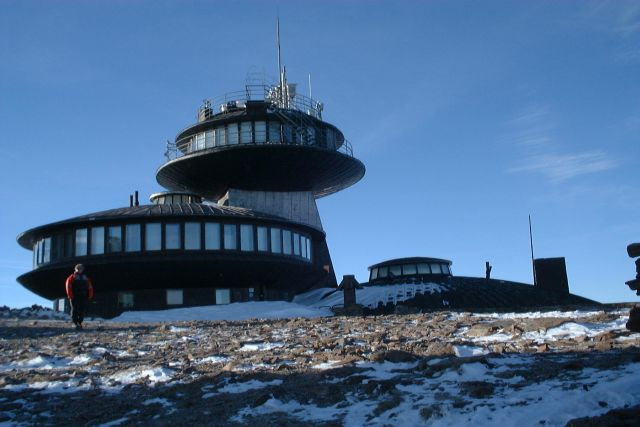
The new observatory - view from the east

=== The middle disk ===
The middle disk with a diameter of about 20 m is located on the southern side of the building. It contains technical facilities of the observatory, rooms for the employees of the observatory and warehouses. It is connected to the shaft, which supports the upper disk. A skylight is located on the roof of the disk. The disk has a basement.

=== The lower disk ===
The lower disk, where the entrance to the observatory is located, has a restaurant open to the public, which offers a view towards the Jelenia Góra Valley, a souvenir store, a rest area for tourists and toilets. The disk is located on the north side of the building and has the largest diameter - about 30 m. A skylight is located on the roof of the disk. The disk has a basement.

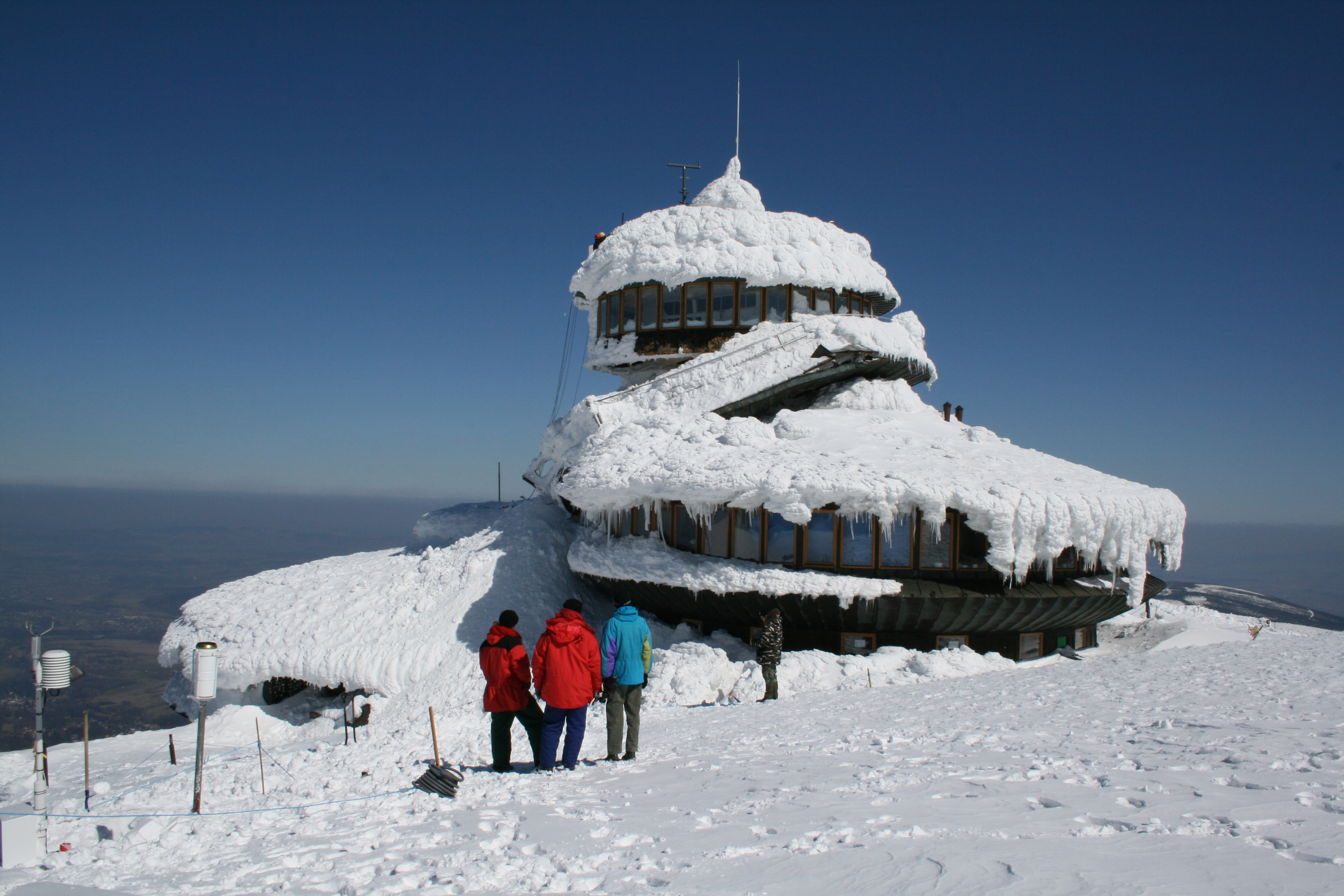
Observatory on Śnieżka shortly after the construction disaster

== Controversy ==
From the moment of its construction, the new building aroused controversy, mostly due to its lack of reference to mountain and Sudeten architecture. It did, however, fit in with the trend of futuristic buildings built in the Sudetenland in Czechoslovakia at that time, represented among others by the hotel on the top of Ještěd (1966-1973), or the TV transmission tower on Praděd (1977-1983).

== Weather garden ==
A weather garden is located a few meters from the building, near the state border with the Czech Republic, in place of the old observatory. The garden has been functioning in this place since 1991, when it was moved from the Czech side.

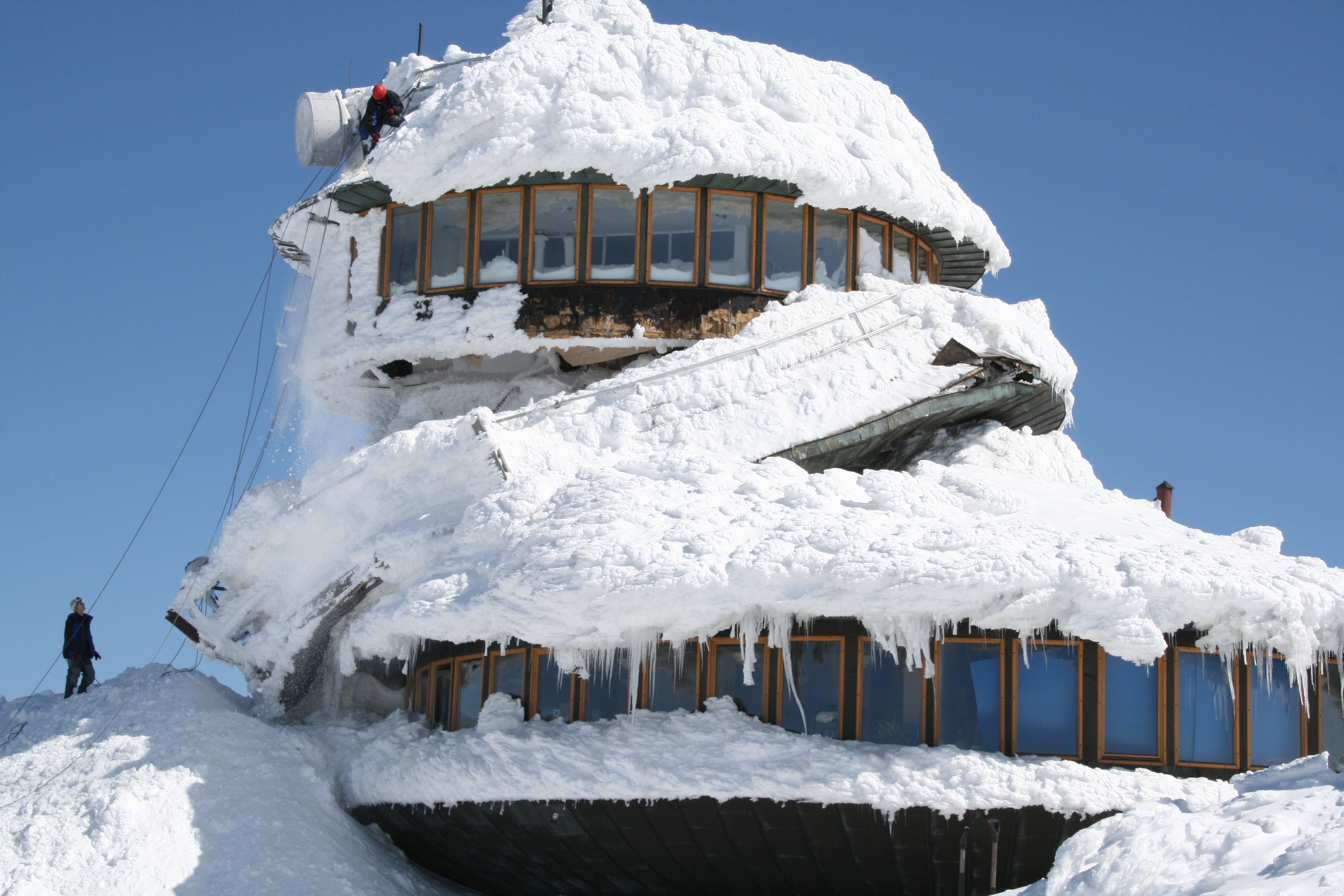
Observatory on Śnieżka in March, 2009

== Observations ==
Observatory on Śnieżka is one of two, next to Kasprowy Wierch, observatories of the Institute of Meteorology and Water Management included in the world system of high mountain stations. The average annual temperature on Śnieżka slightly exceeds 0 °C, reaching 10.6 °C in the warmest month. The highest temperature recorded at the observatory was 25.9 °C (1892). In the post-war period, the highest temperature recorded at the current observatory location was on 28 July 2013: 24,6 °C. The summit of Śnieżka is characterized by hurricane-force winds. The highest average 10-minute wind speed recorded here (21 February 2004) is 65 m/s, or 234 km/h. Record wind gusts reach 80 m/s. Peak haze occurs more than 300 days a year. For about half a year (usually from October to May) a snow cover remains on the summit. The average precipitation exceeds 1000 mm.

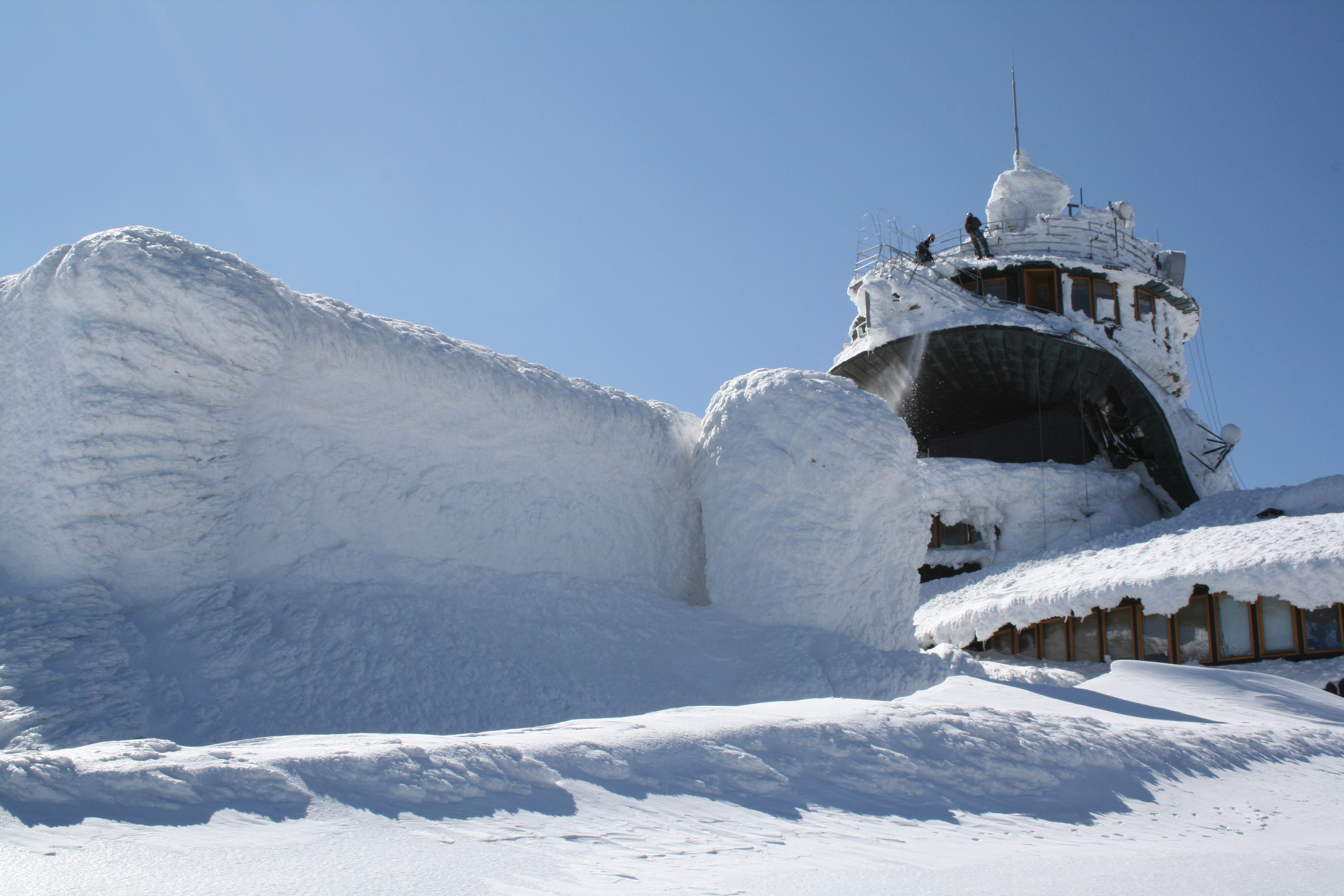
Observatory on Śnieżka in March, 2009

== Educational activities of the observatory ==
An Environmental Education Point operates in the observatory, where you can learn about the functioning of meteorological instruments.

== Construction disasters at the observatory ==
=== 1962 ===
In October 1962 one of the gable walls of the old observatory cracked. Because of this the district architect in Jelenia Góra issued an order to vacate the building within 48 hours. In order to continue observations, safety repairs were carried out - replacing decayed elements and strengthening the walls.

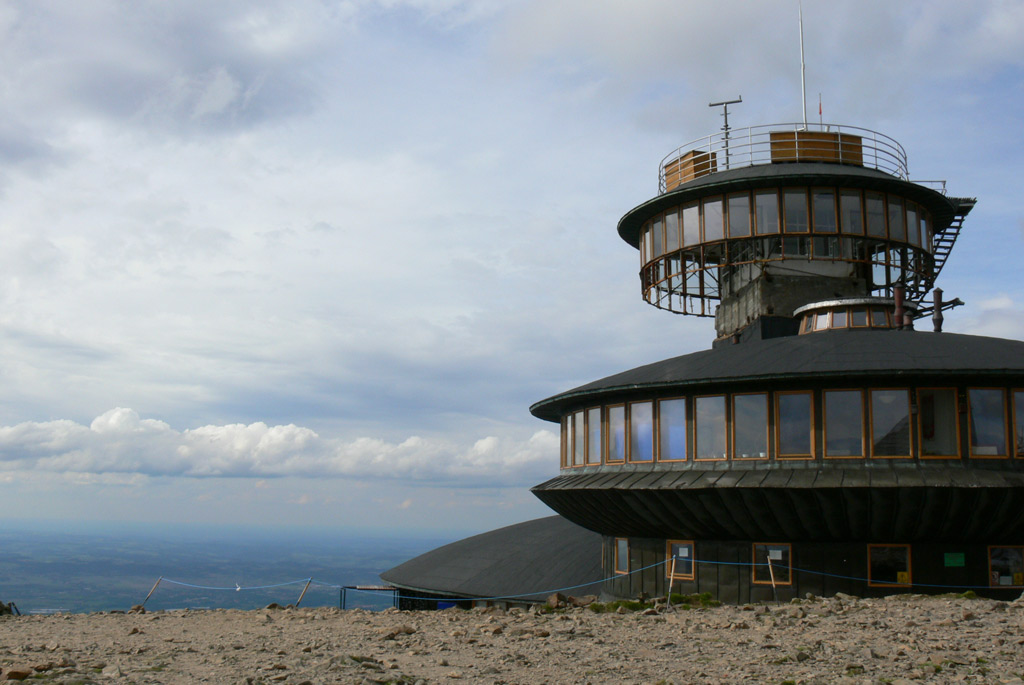
Observatory on Śnieżka after the disaster. June, 2009

=== 2009 ===
On March 11, meteorologists working at the observatory felt a small tremor. On March 12, 2009, a loud crunch was heard and cracks of the wall and bulging of the floor in the upper disk of the observatory were noticed. Employees were evacuated from the observatory and the measuring equipment was moved to the middle disk. The facility and tourist trails leading to the summit from the Polish side were closed on Friday, 13 March. On March 16 a building catastrophe occurred. The steel structure supporting the upper disk was damaged - the supports broke away from the reinforced concrete core and the casing was damaged on 2/3 of its circumference. The demolition of the damaged part of the upper disk began at the end of March. In October 2009 the reconstruction of the disk was completed. Meteorological observations were carried out without interruption as the meteorological observatory at Śnieżka is one of the two Polish observatories included in the global system of alpine stations and it is obliged by the World Meteorological Organization (WMO) to conduct them continuously.

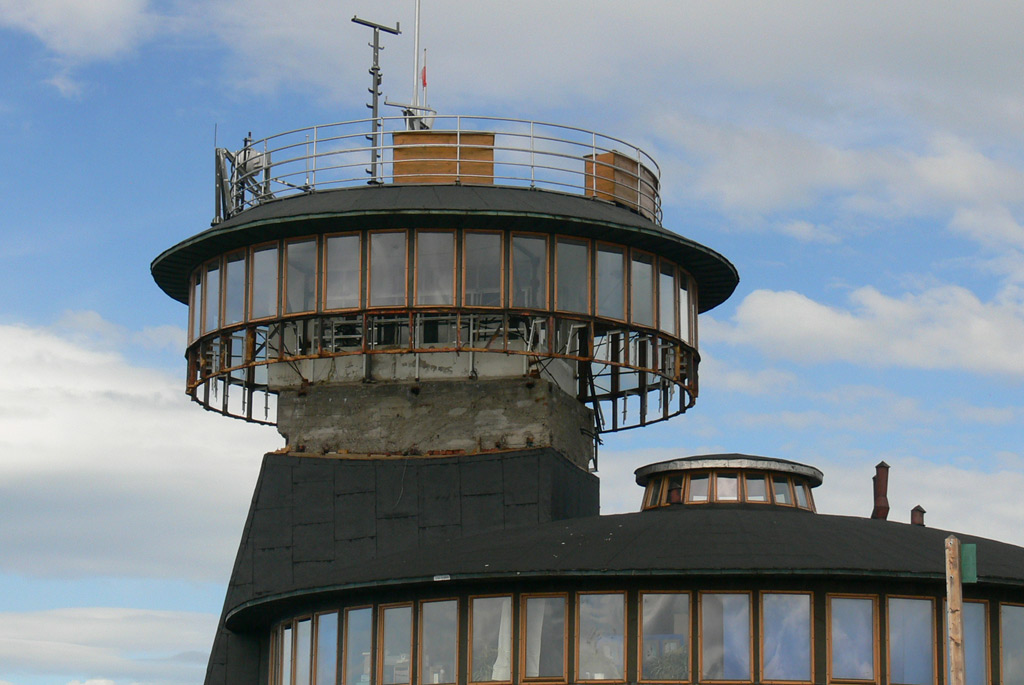
Damage to the observatory's upper disk. June, 2009

== Trivia ==
A model of the Śnieżka High-Mountain Observatory in 1:25 scale can be admired in the Miniature Park of Lower Silesian Monuments in Kowary.

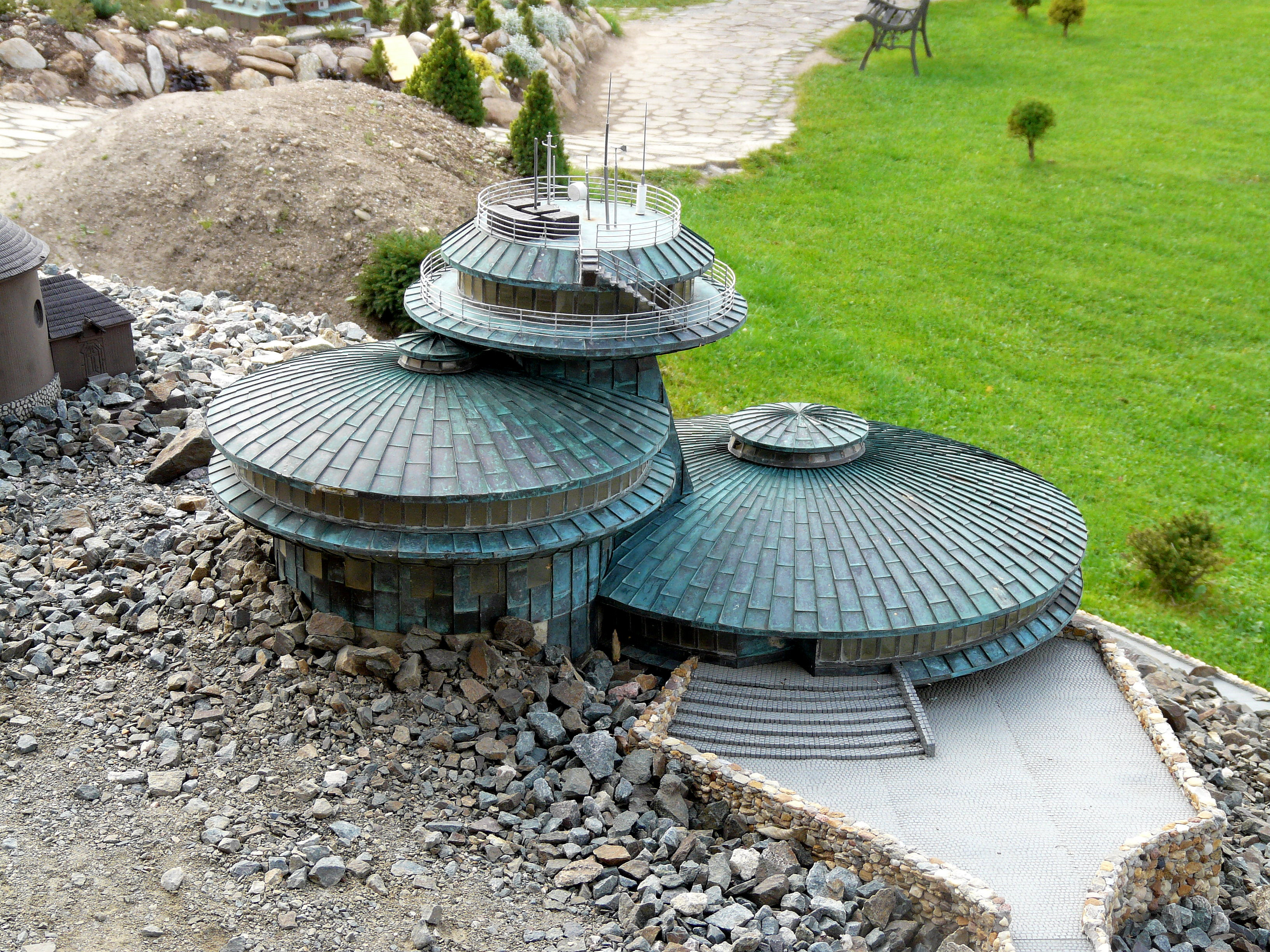
Miniature of the restaurant and the observatory on Śnieżka

The building of the High-mountain Observatory on Śnieżka is a signature of the Student Association of Sudety Mountain Guides in Wrocław.
