= Statue of Albrecht von Roon =

Statue in Berlin, Germany

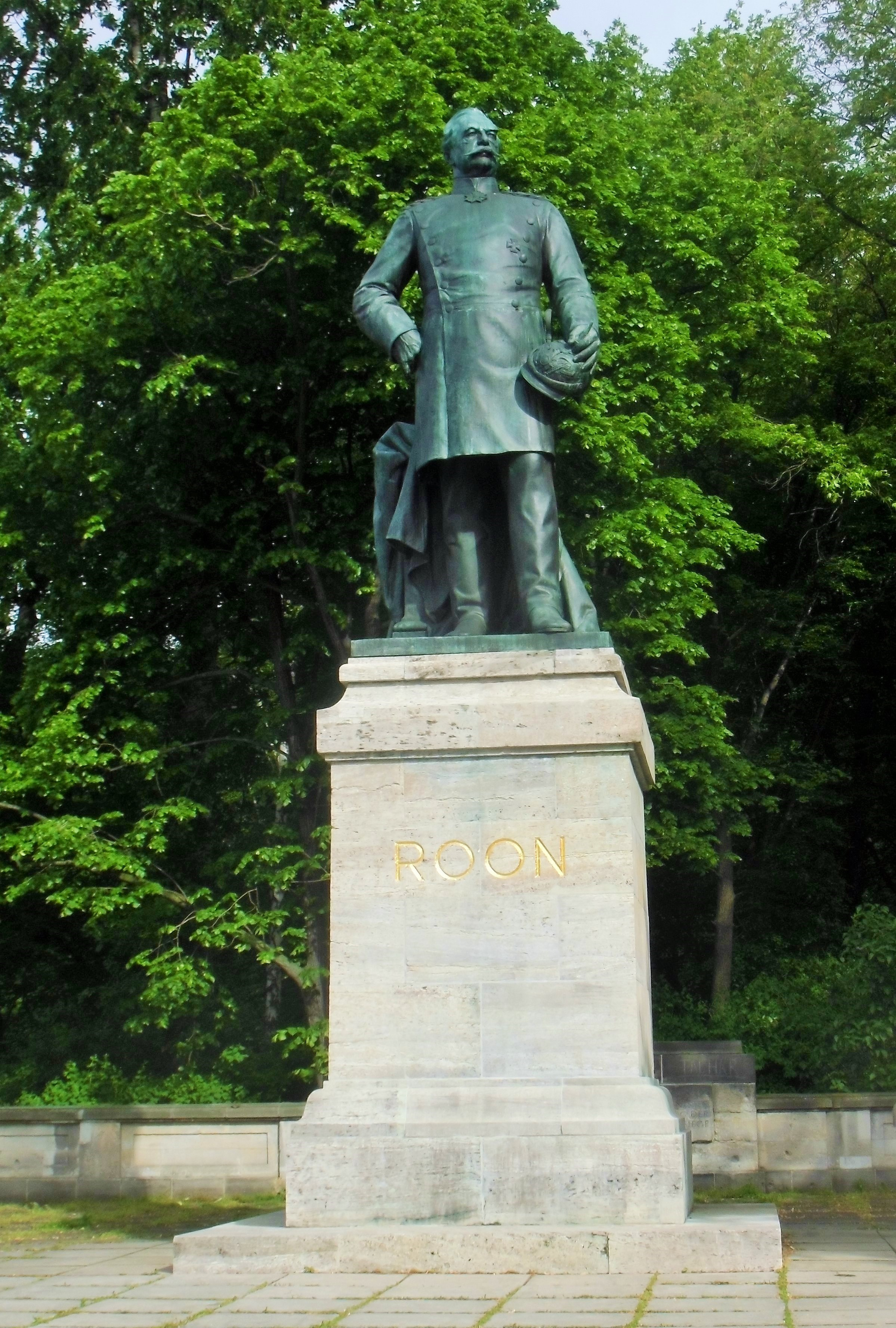
- The sculpture in 2014
- Artist: Harro Magnusson
- Subject: Albrecht von Roon
- Location: Berlin, Germany

The statue of Albrecht von Roon (German: Roon-Denkmal) is an outdoor 1904 monument to Albrecht von Roon by Harro Magnusson, installed in Tiergarten in Berlin, Germany.
