= Pleśna, West Pomeranian Voivodeship =

Pleśna
- Village
- Location within Poland
- Coordinates: 54°14′0″N 15°50′13″E
- Country: Poland
- Voivodeship: West Pomeranian
- County: Koszalin
- Gmina: Będzino
- Population: 30
- Time zone: UTC+1 (CET)
  - Summer (DST): UTC+2 (CEST)
- Vehicle registration: ZKO

Pleśna [ˈplɛɕna] (German: Pleushagen) is a village in the administrative district of Gmina Będzino, within Koszalin County, West Pomeranian Voivodeship, in north-western Poland. It is situated in the historic region of Pomerania near the Baltic coast, approximately 11 km (7 mi) west of Będzino, 24 km (15 mi) west of Koszalin, and 123 km (76 mi) north-east of the regional capital Szczecin. The village has a population of 30.

== History ==
The area became part of the emerging Polish state in the 10th century. Following Poland's fragmentation, it formed part of the Duchy of Pomerania and other splinter duchies. The settlement was first mentioned in a 1334 deed, when the estates passed to the possessions held by the Prince-Bishops of Cammin (Kamień Pomorski). From the 18th century it was located within the Kingdom of Prussia, and from 1871 it was a part of Germany. Under Nazi administration, the place was temporarily renamed Roonshagen and became the site of a Luftwaffe proving ground. Following Germany's defeat in World War II in 1945, the area became again part of Poland.

== Notable residents ==
- Albrecht von Roon (1803–1879), Prussian general and politician
