= Schloss Krobnitz =

- Reichenbach (Oberlausitz), Saxony, Germany
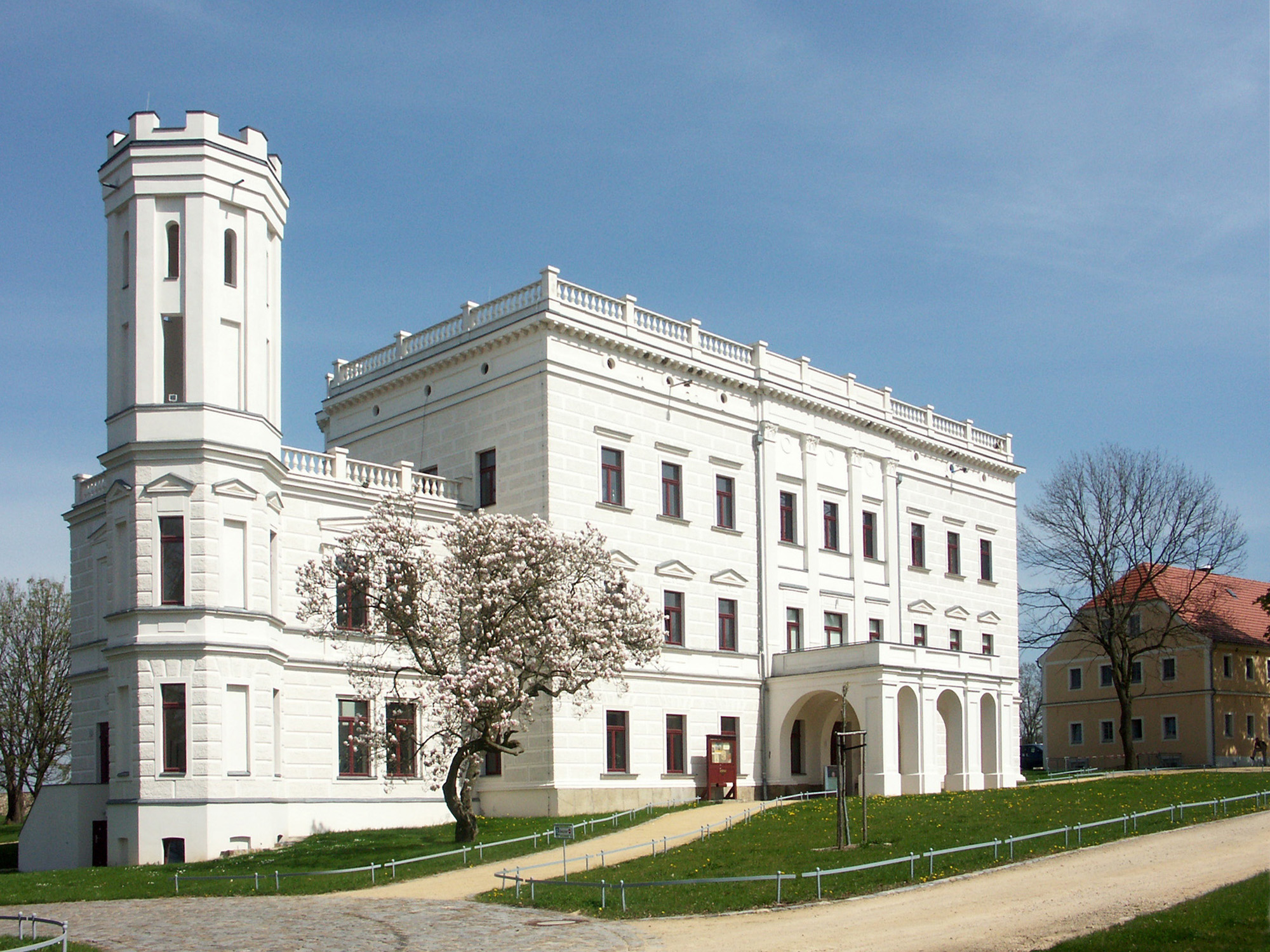
- Schloss Krobnitz

Site information
- Type: Schloss
- Open to the public: Yes

Location
- Location in Germany
- Coordinates: 51.176639°N 14.757583°E

Schloss Krobnitz is a Schloss in Reichenbach (Oberlausitz), Saxony (Germany). Dating from the 17th century, it was the residence of the Prussian Minister of War Albrecht von Roon during the 19th century.

== History ==
A manorial estate on this site was mentioned for the first time in 1315. However, it is not known who the owners of the estate were until the 17th century, when the von Nostiz family acquired the manor. The present manor house was built during the middle of the 18th century, and originally belonged to the family von Üchtritz. The building was originally Baroque in style. In 1873 the estate was acquired by the Prussian Minister of War, Generalfeldmarschall Albrecht von Roon. von Roon rebuilt the building and had an additional floor added. This transformed the Baroque house into a Neoclassical building. The new design was similar to that of the Prussian Ministry of War in Berlin. During the same time, the park of the estate was enlarged. Albrecht von Roon also had a small family burial crypt constructed in the farther reaches of the park. His son, Waldemar von Roon had the chapel enlarged in a Gothic Revival style. The chapel has since been destroyed.

In 1945, the estate was expropriated and the family moved from the castle. For some time it was used to house refugees, but later it was divided into apartments. The whole estate suffered from neglect during the entire East German period. In 2000, it was bought by the local municipality, and it was renovated between 2003 and 2005. It today houses a museum with a permanent exhibition about the life of Albrecht von Roon, as well as the offices of the Schlesisch-Oberlausitzer Museumsverbund, an association of museums that operate in the area.

The estate also includes the former manor house park, a former smithy and stable, and the former estate inspector's house. Events and exhibitions regularly take place at the estate.
