= Albrecht von Roon =

Prussian general (1803–1879)

Albrecht Graf von Roon
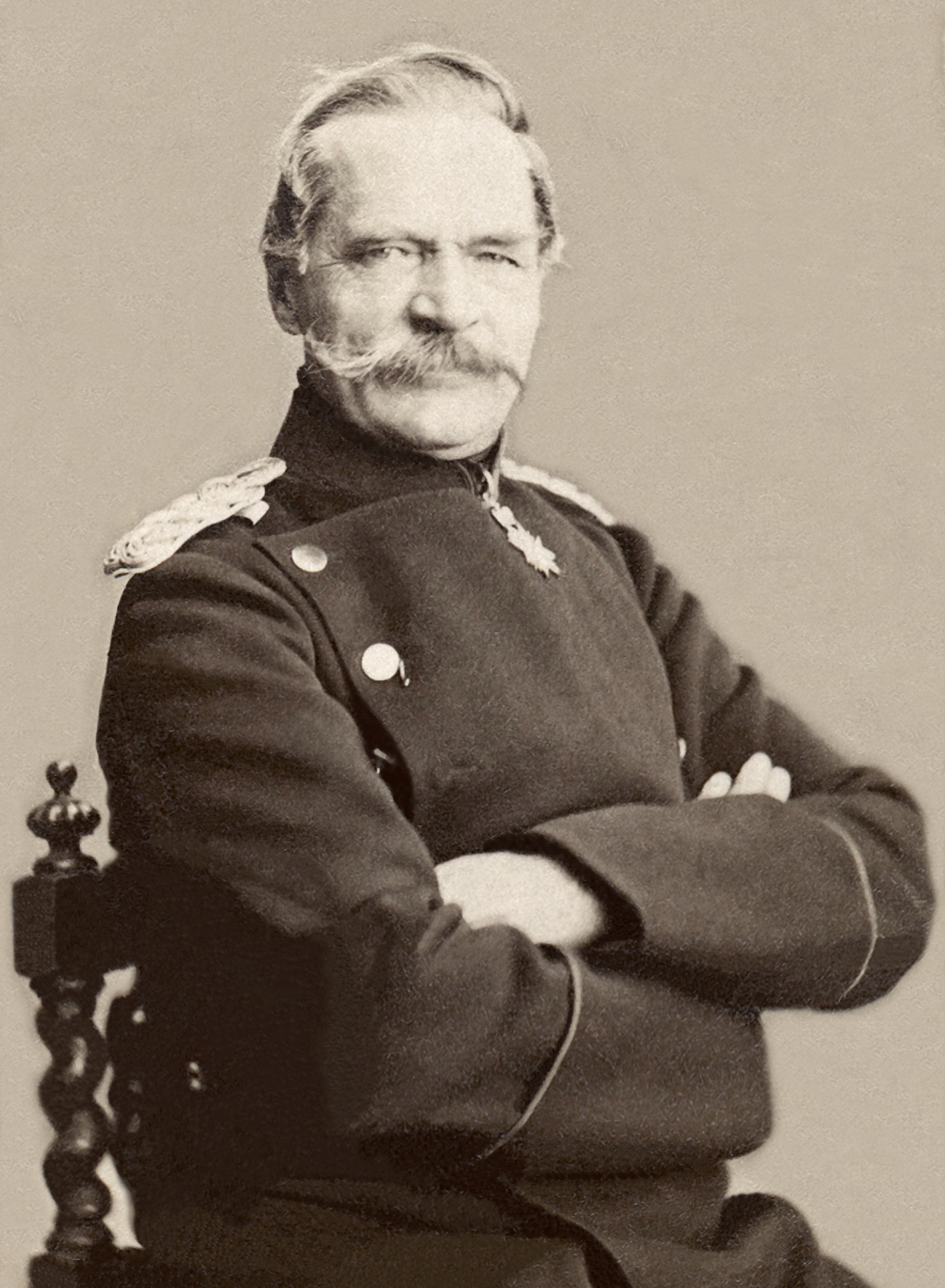
- Albrecht von Roon in the 1870s

Minister President of Prussia
- In office 1 January 1873 – 9 November 1873
- Monarch: Wilhelm I
- Preceded by: Otto von Bismarck
- Succeeded by: Otto von Bismarck

Prussian Minister of War
- In office 5 December 1859 – 9 November 1873
- Preceded by: Eduard von Bonin
- Succeeded by: Georg von Kameke

Personal details
- Born: 30 April 1803 Pleushagen, Province of Pomerania, Holy Roman Empire (now Pleśna, West Pomeranian Voivodeship, Poland)
- Died: 23 February 1879 (aged 75) Berlin, Kingdom of Prussia, German Empire
- Resting place: Reichenbach
- Awards: Pour le Mérite; Order of the Black Eagle; Order of the Red Eagle; House Order of Hohenzollern; Order of the Prussian Crown; Johanniter Order; Iron Cross

Military service
- Allegiance: Kingdom of Prussia; German Confederation; North German Confederation; German Empire
- Branch/service: Prussian Army
- Years of service: 1821–1873
- Rank: Generalfeldmarschall
- Battles/wars: Second Schleswig War; Austro-Prussian War; Franco-Prussian War

Albrecht Theodor Emil Graf von Roon (German pronunciation: [ˈalbʁɛçt fɔn ˈʁoːn]; 30 April 1803 – 23 February 1879) was a Prussian soldier and statesman. As Minister of War from 1859 to 1873, Roon, along with Otto von Bismarck and Helmuth von Moltke, was a dominating figure in Prussia's government during the key decade of the 1860s, when a series of successful wars against Denmark, Austria, and France led to German unification under Prussia's leadership. A moderate conservative and supporter of executive monarchy, he was an avid modernizer who worked to improve the efficiency of the army.

== Education ==
Roon was born at Pleushagen (now Pleśna), near Kolberg (now Kołobrzeg, Poland). His family was of Flemish origin and had settled in Pomerania. His father, an officer of the Prussian Army, died in poverty during the French occupation of the Kingdom of Prussia (see Napoleonic Wars), and the young Roon was brought up by his maternal grandmother.

Roon entered the corps of cadets at Kulm (now Chełmno, Poland) in 1816, from where he proceeded to the military school at Berlin in 1818, and in January 1821, he received a commission in the 14th (3rd Pomeranian) regiment quartered at Stargard in Pomerania. In 1824, he went through the three-year higher course of study at the General War School in Berlin (later called the Prussian Military Academy), where he improved his general education. Two years later, he was transferred to the 15th regiment at Minden.

== Publications ==
In 1826, he was appointed an instructor in the military cadet school at Berlin, where he devoted himself especially to the subject of military geography. He was a student of the noted geographer Carl Ritter who taught at the Berlin military school. In 1832, Roon published the well-known Principles of Physical, National and Political Geography, in three volumes (Grundlage der Erd-, Völker- und Staaten-Kunde), which gained him a great reputation, and of which over 40,000 copies were sold in a few years. This work was followed in 1834 by Elements of Geography (Anfangsgrunde der Erdkunde), in 1837 by Military Geography of Europe (Militärische Landerbeschreibung von Europa), and in 1839 by The Iberian Peninsula (Die Iberische Halbinsel).

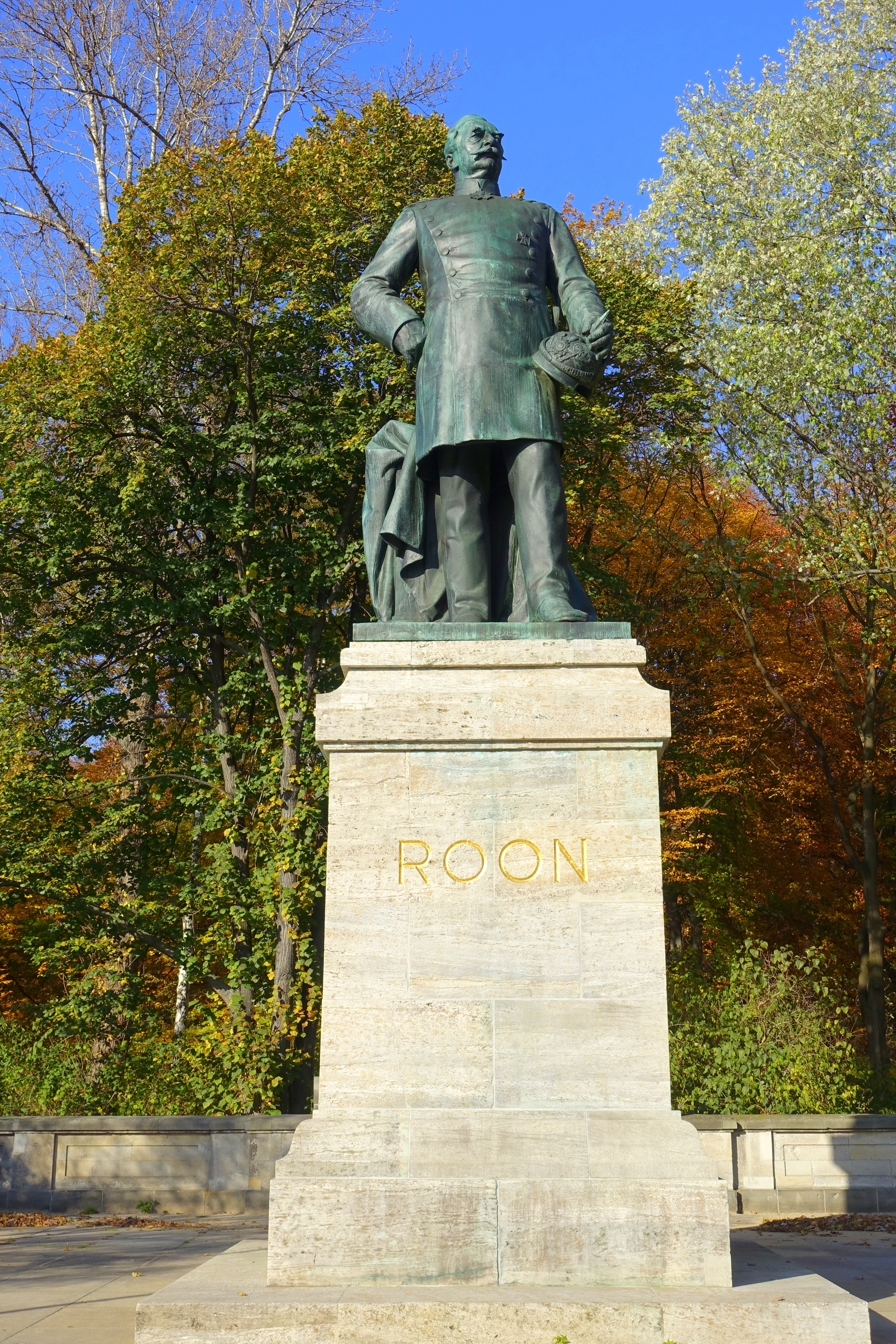
Von Roon statue, Berlin

== Early military career ==
In 1832, Roon rejoined his regiment and was afterwards attached to the headquarters of General von Müffling's corps of observation at Krefeld, where he first became aware of the very inefficient state of the Prussian Army. In 1833, he was appointed to the Topographical Bureau at Berlin. In 1835, he entered the Prussian General Staff, and, in 1835, he was promoted captain and became instructor and examiner in the military academy at Berlin. In 1842, after an illness of two years brought on by overwork, he was promoted to major and attached to the staff of the VII Corps, where he was again impressed with the inefficiency of the organization of the army, and he occupied himself with schemes for its reform.

In 1844, as tutor to Prince Friedrich Karl of Prussia, he attended the prince at Bonn University and in his European travels. In 1848, he was appointed chief of the staff of the VIII Corps at Koblenz. During the disturbances of that year, he served under Prince William, later king and emperor, in the suppression of the insurrection at Baden and distinguished himself by his energy and bravery, receiving the 3rd class of the order of the Red Eagle in recognition of his services. While attached to the prince's staff at that time, Roon broached to the prince his schemes of army reform. In 1850, after the revelation of defective organization and efficiency that led to the humiliating Treaty of Olmütz, Roon was made a lieutenant-colonel and, in 1851, full colonel.

== Army reform ==
Promoted to major-general in 1856 and to lieutenant-general in 1859, Roon had held several commands since 1850, having been employed on important missions. Prince Wilhelm became regent in 1858 and, in 1859, appointed Roon a member of a commission to report on the reorganization of the army. During the Austro-Sardinian War, Roon was charged with the mobilization of a division. At the end of 1859, although he was only a junior lieutenant-general in the army, he succeeded Eduard von Bonin as war minister. In 1861, the ministry of marine was also entrusted to him.

Supported by Edwin von Manteuffel and the new Prussian Chief of Staff, Helmuth von Moltke, Roon drew up plans to adapt Gerhard von Scharnhorst's system to Prussia's altered circumstances. Roon proposed an increase in universal military service to three years, with new regiments raised and a reduced role for the reserve (Landwehr), whose role in the War of Liberation (1813) was still celebrated in nationalist myth.

Roon, by contrast, believed that the Landwehr was both a politically and militarily false institution, limited in utility and lacking martial qualities. Roon's proposals for army reorganization met with strong opposition from the Prussian Landtag, which was dominated by the liberal German Progress Party, which wanted parliamentary control over the military budget. It took years of political fighting and the strong support of the new prime minister, Otto von Bismarck and Moltke, before Roon carried the day.

Roon also lengthened the compulsory military service to three years (four years for artillery and cavalry), and expanded the army to 200,000 men. These reforms were unpopular with the Prussian people and made Roon one of the most hated men in Prussia. However the reforms were supported by the King William I, and the chancellor Otto von Bismarck.

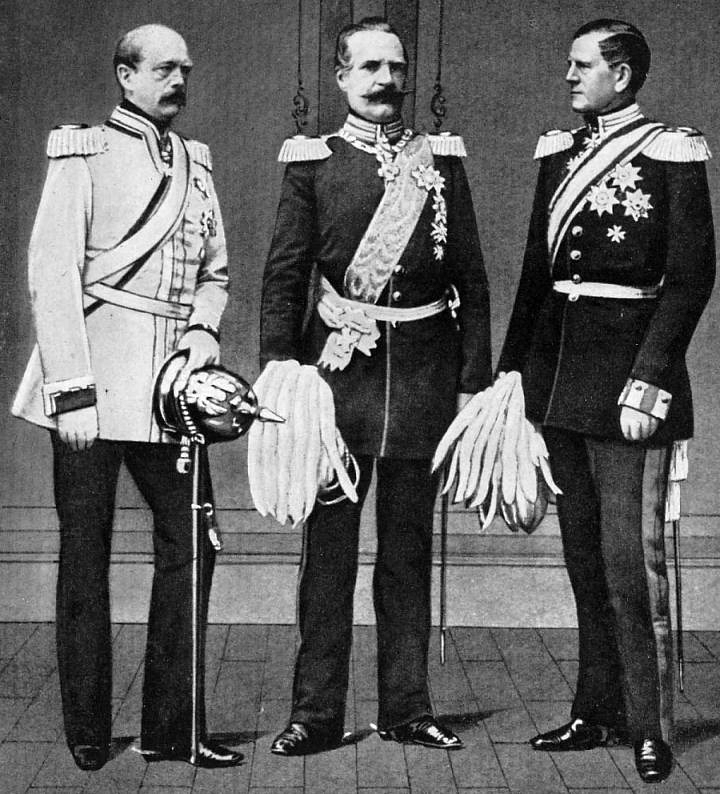
Roon, center, with Otto von Bismarck (left) and Helmuth Graf von Moltke (right). The three leaders of Prussia in the 1860s. Drawing with three cut-out heads.

== National hero ==
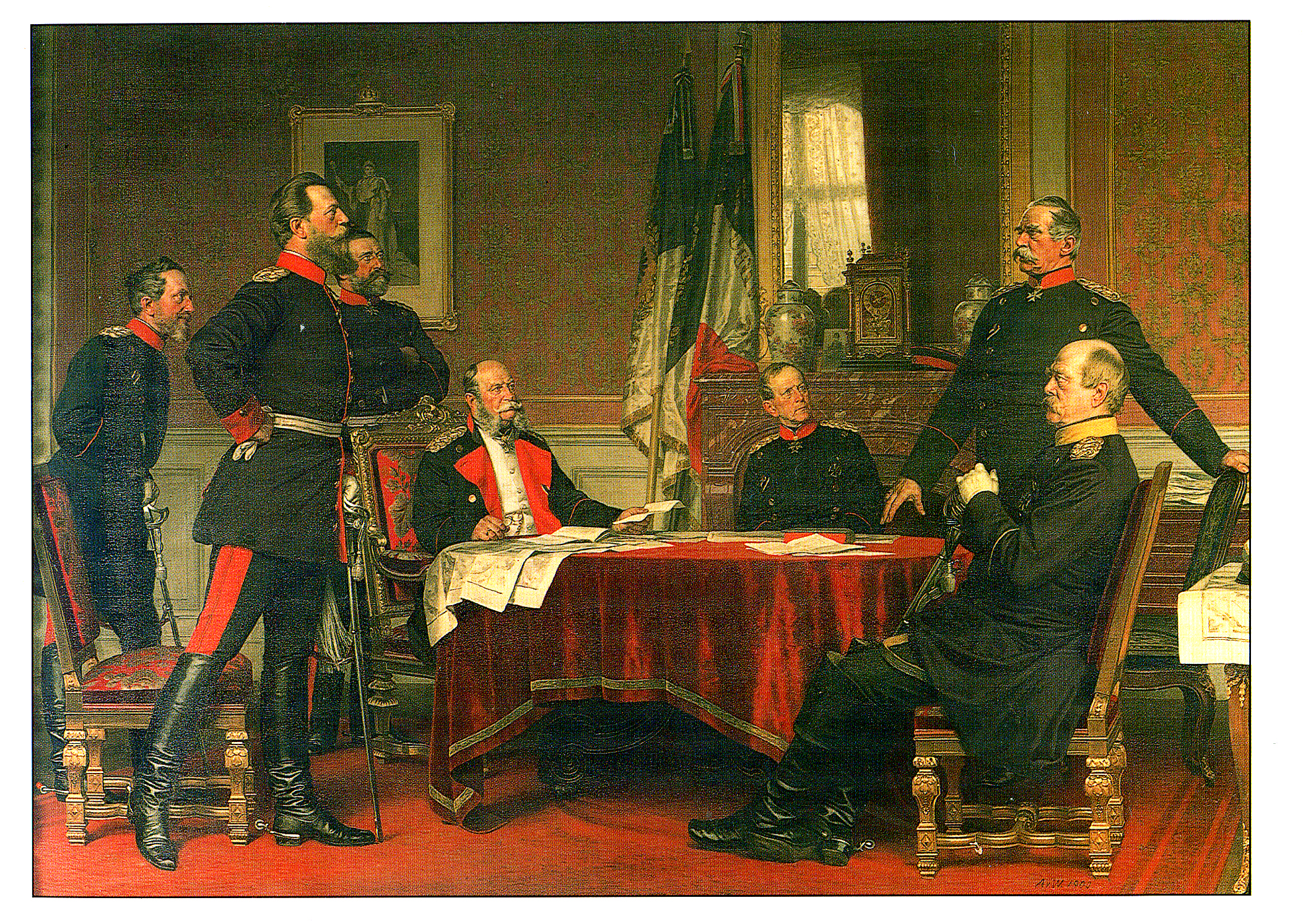
German Headquarters in Versailles, Roon standing at right, painting by Anton von Werner, 1900

After the successful outcome of the Second Schleswig War of 1864, Roon went from being widely disliked in Prussia to a national hero in still-disunited Germany.

At the start of the Austro-Prussian War, Roon was promoted to General der Infanterie. He was present at the decisive victory at Königgrätz, under the command of Moltke. He received the Black Eagle at Nikolsburg on the road to Vienna. His army system was adopted after 1866 by the whole North German Confederation. In later years, his army system was copied throughout continental Europe.

During the Franco-Prussian War in 1870–1871, Roon was in attendance on Prussian King Wilhelm I. The war was a great victory for Prussia and Roon's contribution to success was considerable. He was created a Graf (count) on 19 January 1871, just after Moltke. In January 1873, he succeeded Bismarck (who continued to be Imperial Chancellor) as Minister President of Prussia. Ill-health compelled him to resign later that year, handing the job back to Bismarck. Roon was promoted to field marshal on 1 January 1873. However he resigned from the army soon due to ill health.

Roon died in Berlin on 23 February 1879. He was interred in the Roon family crypt at Schloss Krobnitz, west of Görlitz.

== Memorials ==
The armored cruiser SMS Roon, completed in 1906, was named for Albrecht von Roon. A memorial statue can be found with those for Bismarck and Moltke at the Victory Column in Berlin.

== Honours and awards ==
He received the following orders and decorations:

- Prussia:
  - Knight of Honour of the Johanniter Order, 1848; Knight of Justice, 1858
  - Knight of the Red Eagle, 3rd Class with Bow, 1849; Grand Cross, 16 November 1864; with Swords, 1866
  - Knight of the Crown Order, 1st Class, 18 October 1861; with Enamel Band of the Red Eagle Order, Oak Leaves and Swords on Ring, 1865
  - Grand Commander's Cross of the Royal House Order of Hohenzollern, 1863; with Star and Swords, 22 March 1871
  - Knight of the Black Eagle, 28 July 1866; with Collar, 1867; with Diamonds, 1873
  - Pour le Mérite (military), 28 October 1870
  - Iron Cross (1870), 1st and 2nd Classes
  - Service Award Cross
- Saxony:
  - Grand Cross of the Albert Order, 1860
  - Knight of the Rue Crown, 1870
- (Saxe-Coburg and Gotha) (Duchy of Saxe-Altenburg) (Saxe-Meiningen) Ernestine duchies: Grand Cross of the Saxe-Ernestine House Order, August 1860
- Brunswick: Grand Cross of the Order of Henry the Lion
- Hanover: Grand Cross of the Royal Guelphic Order, 1860
- Hesse-Darmstadt:
  - Grand Cross of the Merit Order of Philip the Magnanimous, 4 December 1860
  - Grand Cross of the Ludwig Order, 9 January 1871
  - Military Merit Cross, 16 March 1871
- Belgium: Grand Cordon of the Order of Leopold (military), 7 February 1861
- Austria:
  - Grand Cross of the Imperial Order of Leopold, 1861
  - Grand Cross of the Royal Hungarian Order of St. Stephen, 1872
- Bavaria:
  - Grand Cross of Merit of the Bavarian Crown, 1861
  - Grand Cross of the Military Merit Order
- Mecklenburg:
  - Grand Cross of the Wendish Crown, with Golden Crown and Swords
  - Military Merit Cross, 2nd Class (Schwerin)
  - Cross for Distinction in War (Strelitz)
- Saxe-Weimar-Eisenach: Grand Cross of the White Falcon, 6 May 1861
- Hesse-Kassel: Grand Cross of the Wilhelmsorden, 15 May 1861
- Nassau: Grand Cross of the Order of Adolphe of Nassau, with Swords, July 1861
- Russia:
  - Knight of St. George, 3rd Class, April 1873
  - Knight of St. Alexander Nevsky, in Diamonds
  - Knight of St. Vladimir, 1st Class with Swords
- Schaumburg-Lippe: Military Merit Medal
- Ascanian duchies: Grand Cross of the Order of Albert the Bear, 20 December 1862
- France: Grand Cross of the Legion of Honour, 9 September 1864
- Baden:
  - Grand Cross of the Military Karl-Friedrich Merit Order, 1867
  - Knight of the House Order of Fidelity, 1871
- Württemberg:
  - Grand Cross of the Württemberg Crown, 1868
  - Grand Cross of the Military Merit Order, 30 December 1870
- Oldenburg: Grand Cross of the Order of Duke Peter Friedrich Ludwig, with Golden Crown and Collar, 16 June 1869

== Bibliography ==
His son published Denkwürdigkeiten aus dem Leben des Generalfeldmarschalls Kriegsministers Grafen Roon (Memorable experiences from the life of General Field Marshal and Minister of War Count Roon) (2 vols., Breslau, 1892), and Kriegsminister von Roon als Redner politisch und militärisch erläutert (Minister of War Roon's Political and Military Speeches Examined) (Breslau, 1895). His correspondence with his friend Professor Cl. Perthes, 1864–67, was also published at Breslau in 1895.

== See also ==
- Bismarck-Roon cabinet

Political offices
| Preceded by Eduard von Bonin | Prussian Minister of War; 5 December 1859 – 9 November 1873 | Succeeded by Georg von Kameke |
| Preceded by Prince Bismarck | Minister President of Prussia; 1873 | Succeeded by Prince Bismarck |
