= Polish National Road Race Championships =

National road cycling championship in Poland

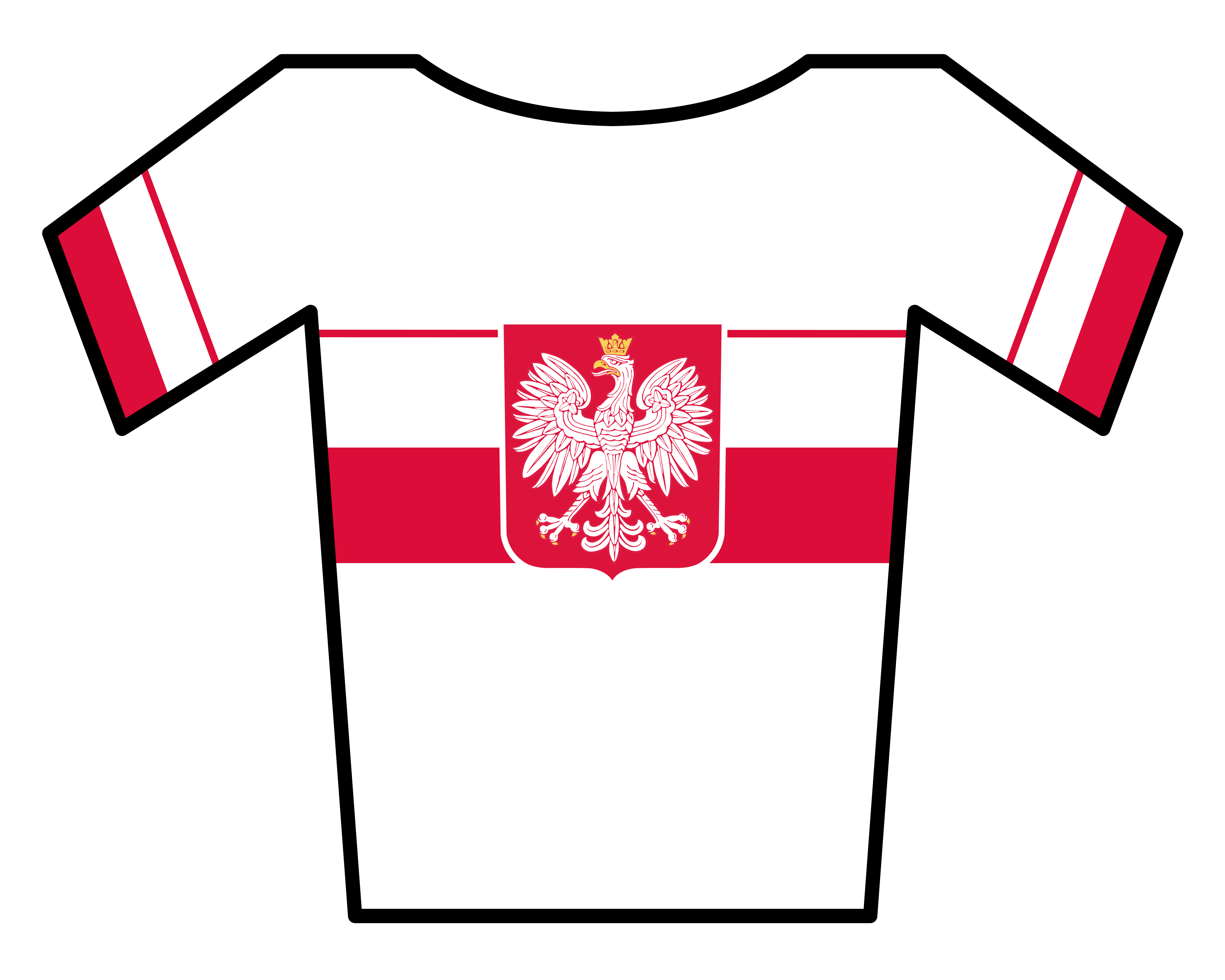
The champion's jersey

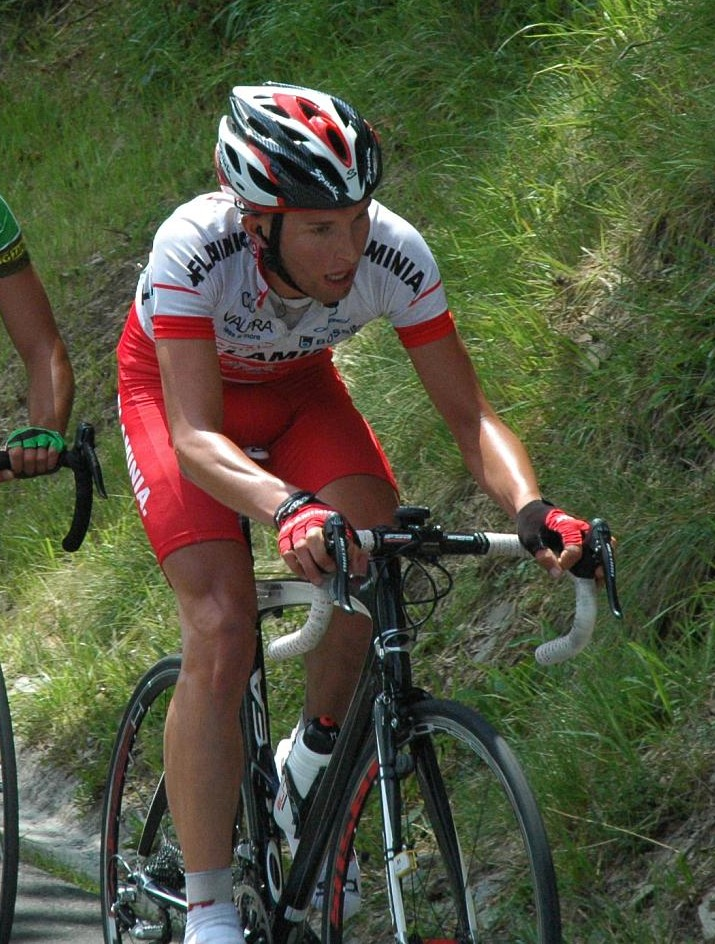
Tomasz Marczyński

The Polish National Road Race Championships are held annually to decide the Polish cycling champions in the road race discipline, across various categories.

== Men ==
=== Amateur ===
Year	Gold	Silver	Bronze
1919	Franciszek Zawadzki	Stanisław Gronczewski	Feliks Kubasiński
1921	Józef Lange	Wiktor Hoechsman	Henryk Chyłko
1922	Wiktor Hoechsman	Feliks Kubasiński	Jan Łazarski
1923	Wiktor Hoechsman	Henryk Chyłko	Izydor Stieglitz
1924	Wiktor Hoechsman	Kazimierz Krzemiński	Marian Blicharski
1925	Mieczysław Lange	Tadeusz Bartodziejski	Oswald Miller
1926	Kazimierz Dusiński	Tadeusz Bartodziejski	Serafin Ziembicki
1927	Jerzy Waliński	Eugeniusz Michalak	Franciszek Kostrzębski
1928	Józef Stefański	Stanisław Kłosowicz	Julian Popowski
1929	Józef Stefański	Feliks Więcek	Wacław Kołodziejczyk
1930	Józef Stefański	Antoni Wlokas	Stanisław Kłosowicz
1931	Józef Stefański	Stanisław Kłosowicz	Eugeniusz Targoński
1932	Stanisław Kłosowicz	Wilhelm Dłucik	Mieczysław Narożny
1933	Michal Korsak-Zaleski	Feliks Brymas	Franciszek Kielbasa
1934	Wiktor Olecki	Franciszek Kiełbasa	Ewald Rurański
1935	Bolesław Napierała	Wiktor Olecki	Franciszek Kielbasa
1936	Stanisław Zieliński	Wiktor Olecki	Jan Kluj
1937	Stanisław Wasilewski	Władysław Wandor	Józef Ignaczak
1938	Józef Kapiak	Mieczysław Kapiak	Franciszek Kiełbasa
1939	Józef Kapiak	Stanisław Wasilewski	Mieczysław Kapiak
1940– 1944	Not held due to World War II		
1945	Zygmunt Wisniewski	Wacław Wójcik	Jan Kluj
1946	Jan Kluj	Marian Rzeznicki	Tadeusz Gabrych
1947	Bolesław Napierała	Wacław Wójcik	Kazimierz Banski
1948	Lucjan Pietraszewski	Waclaw Wrzesiński	Marian Rzeznicki
1949	Waclaw Wrzesiński	Henryk Czyż	Marian Rzeznicki
1950	Wacław Wójcik	Teofil Salyga	Wojciech Królikowski
1951	Jozef Kapiak	Henryk Czyż	Wacław Wójcik
1952	Stanisław Krolak	Teofil Salyga	Stanisław Swiercz
1953	Wladyslaw Klabinski	Stanisław Krolak	Mieczysław Wilczewski
1954	Tadeusz Drazkowski	Eligiusz Grabowski	Stanisław Bedynski
1955	Stanisław Krolak	Henryk Hadasik	Wladyslaw Klabinski
1956	Andrzej Trochanowski	Waclaw Wrzesiński	Henryk Lasak
1957	Andrzej Trochanowski	Janusz Paradowski	Stanisław Bugalski
1958	Bogusław Fornalczyk	Jerzy Pancek	Stanisław Krolak
1959	Janusz Paradowski	Jan Chtiej	Henryk Kowalski
1960	Jan Kudra	Mieczysław Wilczewski	Zygmunt Kaczmarczyk
1961	Roman Chtiej	Stanisław Gazda	Józef Gawliczek
1962	Jan Kudra	Kazimierz Domański	Jan Ścibiorek
1963	Roman Chtiej	Adam Gęszka	Waldemar Słowiński
1964	Jan Kudra	Józef Staroń	Marian Kegel
1965	Józef Staroń	Marian Forma	Wojciech Goszczyński
1966	Jan Magiera	Marian Kegel	Jan Kudra
1967	Wojciech Matusiak	Zenon Czechowski	Józef Gawliczek
1968	Kazimierz Jasiński	Marian Kegel	Stanisław Żaczek
1969	Ryszard Szurkowski	Andrzej Kaczmarek	Zenon Czechowski
1970	Zygmunt Hanusik	Lech Kluj	Lucjan Lis
1971	Edward Barcik	Stanisław Szozda	Jan Smyrak
1972	Tadeusz Kmiec	Zbigniew Krzeszowiec	Zygmunt Hanusik
1973	Stanisław Szozda	Ryszard Szurkowski	Janusz Kowalski
1974	Ryszard Szurkowski	Stanisław Szozda	Janusz Kowalski
1975	Ryszard Szurkowski	Wojciech Matusiak	Stanisław Mikołajczuk
1976	Jan Brzeźny	Mieczysław Nowicki	Ryszard Szurkowski
1977	Tadeusz Zawada	Florian Andrzejewski	Stanisław Czaja
1978	Ryszard Szurkowski	Jan Brzeźny	Jan Jankiewicz
1979	Ryszard Szurkowski	Jan Krawczyk	Jan Faltyn
1980	Janusz Pożak	Tadeusz Wojtas	Jan Brzeźny
1981	Jan Brzeźny	Józef Szpakowski	Jan Majchrowski
1982	Lech Piasecki	Jerzy Świnoga	Sławomir Podwójniak
1983	Andrzej Jaskuła	Tadeusz Piotrowicz	Adam Zagajewski
1984	Lechosław Michalak	Andrzej Mierzejewski	Lech Piasecki
1985	Andrzej Mierzejewski	Mieczysław Karłowicz	Marek Szerszyński
1986	Sławomir Krawczyk	Mieczysław Mazurek	Roman Rękosiewicz
1987	Zdzisław Wrona	Marian Gołdyn	Zbigniew Szczepkowski
1988	Andrzej Mierzejewski	Zdzisław Wrona	Andrzej Sypytkowski
1989	Joachim Halupczok	Zbigniew Albin	Janusz Domin
1990	Czesław Rajch	Sławomir Krawczyk	Jacek Mickiewicz
1991	Marek Leśniewski	Jerzy Sikora	Bogdan Jamiński
1992	Czesław Rajch	Andrzej Sypytkowski	Zbigniew Piątek
1993	Marek Leśniewski	Dariusz Banaszek	Artur Lemcio
1994	Jacek Mickiewicz	Paweł Niedźwiecki	Wojciech Drabik

=== Elite ===
Year	Gold	Silver	Bronze
1990	Zenon Jaskuła	Marek Szerszyński	Marek Kulas
1995	Andrzej Sypytkowski	Gregorz Rosolinski	Jacek Mickiewicz
1996	Dariusz Wojciechowski	Marek Leśniewski	Tomasz Kloczko
1997	Piotr Wadecki	Gregorz Rosolinski	Artur Krasinski
1998	Tomasz Brożyna	Grzegorz Gwiazdowski	Cezary Zamana
1999	Cezary Zamana	Piotr Przydział	Andrzej Sypytkowski
2000	Piotr Wadecki	Zbigniew Piątek	Dariusz Wojciechowski
2001	Radosław Romanik	Zbigniew Piątek	Paweł Niedźwiecki
2002	Grzegorz Gronkiewicz	Krzysztof Jeżowski	Jarosław Zarebski
2003	Piotr Przydział	Zbigniew Piątek	Gregorz Kwiatkowski
2004	Marek Wesoły	Artur Krzeszowiec	Krzysztof Jeżowski
2005	Adam Wadecki	Marcin Gebka	Piotr Mazur
2006	Mariusz Witecki	Tomasz Marczyński	Kazimierz Stafiej
2007	Tomasz Marczyński	Jacek Morajko	Robert Radosz
2008	Marcin Sapa	Bartłomiej Matysiak	Maciej Bodnar
2009	Krzysztof Jeżowski	Tomasz Smoleń	Błażej Janiaczyk
2010	Jacek Morajko	Mariusz Witecki	Maciej Bodnar
2011	Tomasz Marczyński	Tomasz Smoleń	Maciej Paterski
2012	Michał Gołaś	Tomasz Smoleń	Sylwester Janiszewski
2013	Michał Kwiatkowski	Adrian Honkisz	Łukasz Bodnar
2014	Bartłomiej Matysiak	Paweł Franczak	Michał Podlaski
2015	Tomasz Marczyński	Michał Gołaś	Paweł Bernas
2016	Rafał Majka	Marek Rutkiewicz	Sylwester Janiszewski
2017	Adrian Kurek	Marek Rutkiewicz	Emanuel Piaskowy
2018	Michał Kwiatkowski	Maciej Bodnar	Łukasz Owsian
2019	Michał Paluta	Paweł Cieślik	Mateusz Taciak
2020	Stanisław Aniołkowski	Szymon Sajnok	Paweł Franczak
2021	Maciej Paterski	Alan Banaszek	Łukasz Owsian
2022	Norbert Banaszek	Szymon Rekita	Łukasz Owsian
2023	Alan Banaszek	Filip Maciejuk	Marcin Budziński
2024	Norbert Banaszek	Bartosz Rudyk	Patryk Stosz
2025	Rafał Majka	Paweł Bernas	Mateusz Gajdulewicz

=== Under 23 ===
Year	Gold	Silver	Bronze
2003	Dariusz Rudnicki	Artur Król	Mariusz Wiesiak
2006	Michał Gołas	Piotr Zieliński	Paweł Wachnik
2007	Piotr Krysman	Maciej Paterski	Piotr Osiński
2008	Piotr Osiński	Adrian Honkisz	Marcin Urbanowski
2009	Michał Kwiatkowski	Radosław Syrojc	Piotr Krajewski
2010	Paweł Charucki	Dariusz Gluszak	Jarosław Kowalczyk
2011	Marek Kulas	Łukasz Owsian	Karol Domagalski
2012	Paweł Poljański	Paweł Bernas	Łukasz Wisniowski
2013	Łukasz Wisniowski	Wojciech Migdał	Konrad Tomasiak
2014	Piotr Brożyna	Wojciech Franczak	Tomasz Mickiewicz
2015	Michał Paluta	Mateusz Grabis	Piotr Jaromin
2016	Michał Paluta	Piotr Konwa	Piotr Brożyna
2017	Szymon Tracz	Damian Sławek	Tobiasz Pawlak
2018	Damian Sławek	Kamil Małecki	Mateusz Kostański
2019	Szymon Sajnok	Stanisław Aniołkowski	Karol Kuklewicz
2020	Szymon Krawczyk	Paweł Szóstka	Adam Kuś
2021	Mateusz Kostański	Marcin Zarębski	Karol Wawrzyniak
2022	Damian Papierski	Jakub Soszka	Radosław Frątczak
2023	Mikołaj Szulik	Julian Kot	Kacper Maciejuk
2024	Marek Kapela	Maksymilian Radosz	Mateusz Gajdulewicz
2025	Dawid Lewandowski	Michał Pomorski	Franciszek Matuszewski

== Women ==
=== Senior ===
Year	Gold	Silver	Bronze
2004	Bogumiła Matusiak	Paulina Brzeźna	Magdalena Zamolska
2005	Paulina Brzeźna	Małgorzata Jasińska	Maja Włoszczowska
2006	Maja Włoszczowska	Paulina Brzeźna	Anna Szafraniec
2007	Maja Włoszczowska	Aleksandra Wnuczek	Ania Harkowska
2008	Paulina Brzeźna	Małgorzata Jasińska	Ania Harkowska
2009	Małgorzata Jasińska	Edyta Jasińska	Paulina Brzeźna
2010	Małgorzata Jasińska	Maja Włoszczowska	Aleksandra Dawidowicz
2011	Anna Szafraniec	Paulina Brzeźna	Maja Włoszczowska
2012	Katarzyna Pawłowska	Paulina Brzeźna	Małgorzata Jasińska
2013	Eugenia Bujak	Paulina Brzeźna-Bentkowska	Katarzyna Pawłowska
2014	Paulina Guz	Monika Brzeźna	Monika Żur
2015	Małgorzata Jasińska	Katarzyna Wilkos	Paulina Brzeźna-Bentkowska
2016	Katarzyna Niewiadoma	Anna Plichta	Małgorzata Jasińska
2017	Karolina Karasiewicz	Monika Brzeźna	Anna Plichta
2018	Małgorzata Jasińska	Nikol Płosaj	Marta Lach
2019	Łucja Pietrzak	Agnieszka Skalniak	Daria Pikulik
2020	Marta Lach	Katarzyna Wilkos	Łucja Pietrzak
2021	Karolina Karasiewicz	Daria Pikulik	Dominika Włodarczyk
2022	Wiktoria Pikulik	Dorota Przęzak	Daria Pikulik
2023	Monika Brzeźna	Karolina Perekitko	Zuzanna Chylińska
2024	Dominika Włodarczyk	Marta Jaskulska	Zuzanna Chylińska
2025	Katarzyna Niewiadoma-Phinney	Dominika Włodarczyk	Agnieszka Skalniak-Sójka
