= Krawczyk =

Krawczyk is the 17th most common surname in Poland (64,543 people in 2009). Tailor's Son is an English translation of the name. The Polish root krawiec translates as tailor and the suffix czyk as son of.

Notable people with this name include:

- Albert Krawczyk (born 1934), American politician from Vermont
- Andrzej Krawczyk (born 1976), Polish discus thrower
- Betty Krawczyk (1928–2025), American environmental activist and author
- Bogusław Krawczyk (1906–1941), Polish submarine commander
- Charlotte Krawczyk, German geophysicist
- Desirae Krawczyk (born 1994), American tennis player
- Eliana Krawczyk (1982–2017), Argentine military officer
- Gérard Krawczyk (born 1953), French film director
- Glenn Krawczyk, Icehouse guitarist
- Henry Krawczyk (born 1946), American sprint canoer
- Henryk Krawczyk (born 1946), Polish university rector
- Hugo Krawczyk, Argentine-Israeli cryptographer
- Jacek Krawczyk (born 1949), Polish swimmer
- Jan Krawczyk (1956–2018), Polish racing cyclist
- Janusz Krawczyk (1949–2021), Polish luger
- Jerzy Krawczyk (1928–2008), Polish boxer
- Johanna Krawczyk (born 1984), French writer and screenwriter
- Joseph L. Krawczyk Jr. (born 1947), American politician from Vermont
- Judy Krawczyk (born 1939), American politician from Wisconsin
- Karina Krawczyk (born 1971), German actress
- Katarzyna Krawczyk (born 1990), Polish wrestler
- Krzysztof Krawczyk (1946–2021), Polish pop singer
- Krzysztof Krawczyk (athlete) (born 1962), Polish high jumper
- Marek Krawczyk (born 1976), Polish swimmer
- Marianne Krawczyk (born 1964), American screenwriter and video game writer
- Mirosław Krawczyk (1953–2026), Polish actor
- Monika Krawczyk, Polish road cyclist
- Piotr Krawczyk (born 1994), Polish footballer
- Ray Krawczyk (born 1959), American baseball player
- Richard Krawczyk (born 1947), French football player
- Robert Krawczyk (born 1978), Polish judoka
- Sławomir Krawczyk (born 1963), Polish road cyclist
- Stephan Krawczyk (born 1955), German writer and songwriter
- Szymon Krawczyk (born 1998), Polish cyclist
- Tadeusz Krawczyk (born 1959), Polish racing cyclist

== Fictional characters ==
- Andy Krawczyk, The Wire character
- Karol Krawczyk, Miodowe lata character
