= Ronan Racault =

French road cyclist (born 1988)

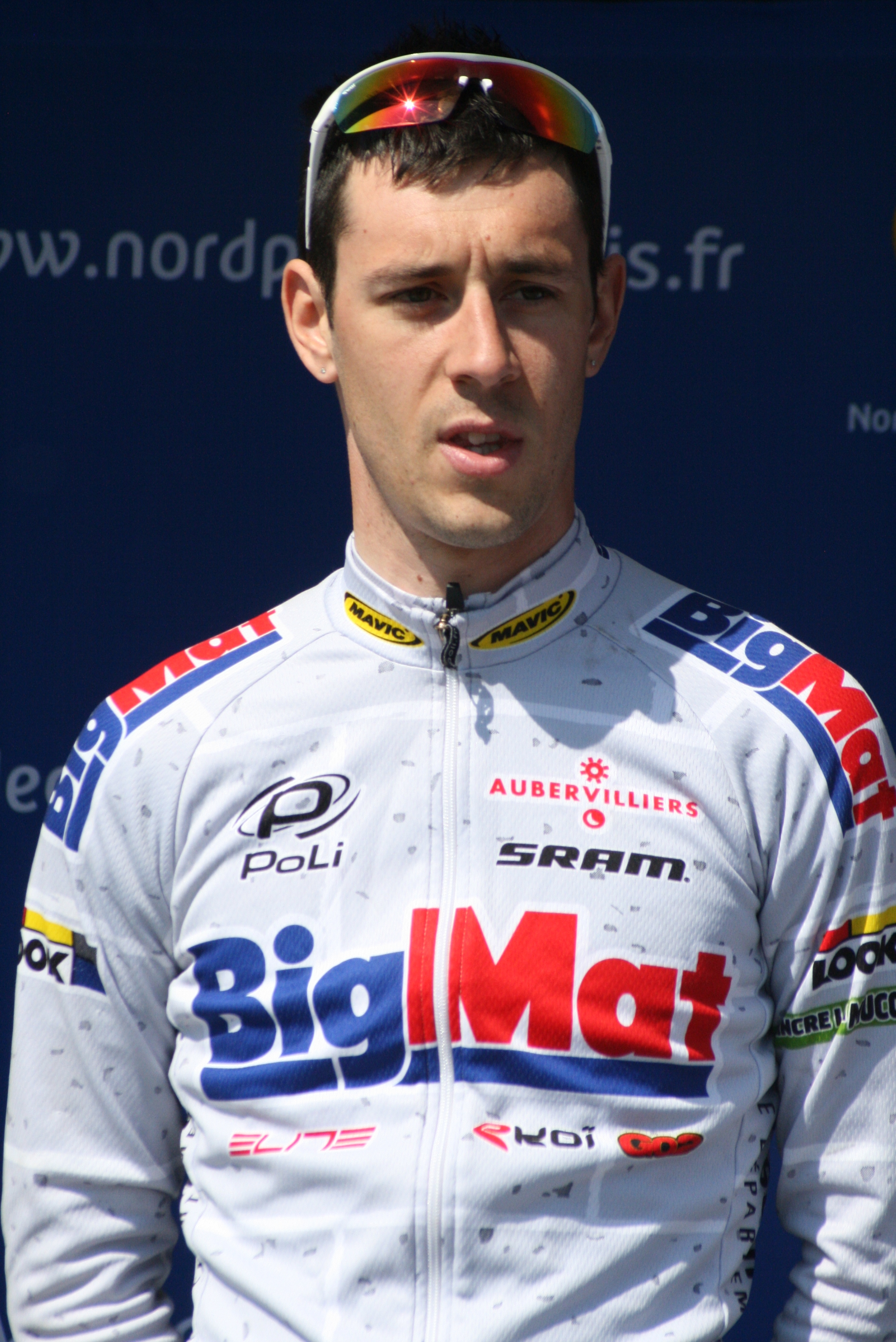
- Racault at the 2011 Four Days of Dunkirk

Personal information
- Born: 2 November 1988 (age 37) Blois, France

Cycling career
- Sport: Cycling
- Current team: Guidon Chalettois
- Discipline: Road
- Role: Rider

Amateur teams
- 2007–2008: Cercle Gambetta Orléans-Loiret
- 2009: Saint-Cyr sur Loire–Tours Agglo 37
- 2010: CM Aubervilliers 93-BigMat
- 2013–2014: VS chartrain
- 2015–2017: Guidon Chalettois
- 2018: Peltrax–CS Dammarie-lès-Lys
- 2019–2020: Pro Immo Nicolas Roux
- 2021–: Guidon Chalettois

Professional teams
- 2010: BigMat–Auber 93 (stagiaire)
- 2011–2012: BigMat–Auber 93

Ronan Racault (born 2 November 1988 in Blois) is a French road cyclist, who currently rides for French amateur team Guidon Chalettois.

== Major results ==
2011
4th Overall Ronde de l'Oise
2014
2nd Bordeaux-Saintes
2015
2nd Paris–Chauny
2016
2nd Paris–Mantes-en-Yvelines
2017
6th Paris–Mantes-en-Yvelines
2018
8th Paris–Mantes-en-Yvelines
2019
2nd Paris–Mantes-en-Yvelines
