= Niels Brouzes =

French cyclist (born 1981)

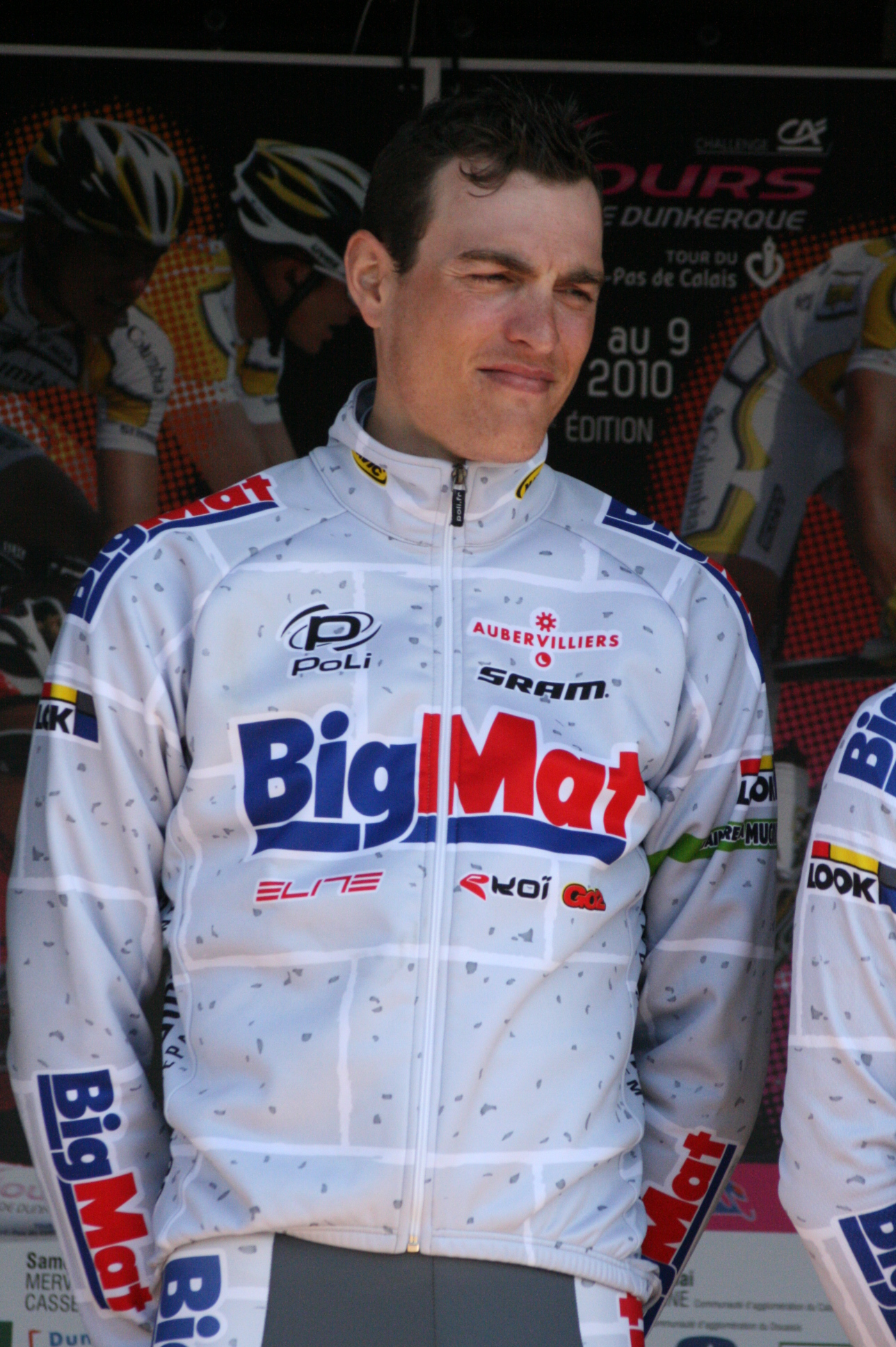
- Brouzes at 2010 Four Days of Dunkirk

Personal information
- Full name: Niels Brouzes
- Born: 3 February 1981 (age 45) Drancy, France

Cycling career
- Sport: Cycling
- Current team: Retired
- Discipline: Road
- Role: Rider

Amateur teams
- 1999: COM Argenteuil
- 2000: ACBB
- 2001–2002: CM Aubervilliers 93
- 2001: BigMat–Auber 93 (stagiaire)
- 2011: VC Rouen 76

Professional team
- 2002–2010: BigMat–Auber 93

Niels Brouzes (born 3 February 1981) is a French former professional road bicycle racer.

== Major results ==
1999
3rd Chrono des Nations Juniors
2000
1st Chrono des Nations Espoirs
2001
1st Road race, National Under-23 Road Championships
1st Stage 3 Circuit des Ardennes
2nd Overall Ruban Granitier Breton
2004
2nd Mi-Août Bretonne 4
2005
5th Tour de Vendée
6th Tour du Jura
6th Grand Prix de la Ville de Nogent-sur-Oise
2007
1st Tour du Finistère
1st Paris–Mantes-en-Yvelines
5th Classic Loire Atlantique
2008
1st Overall Ronde de l'Oise
8th Duo Normand
2009
8th Paris–Troyes
