= Nicolas Baldo =

French racing cyclist

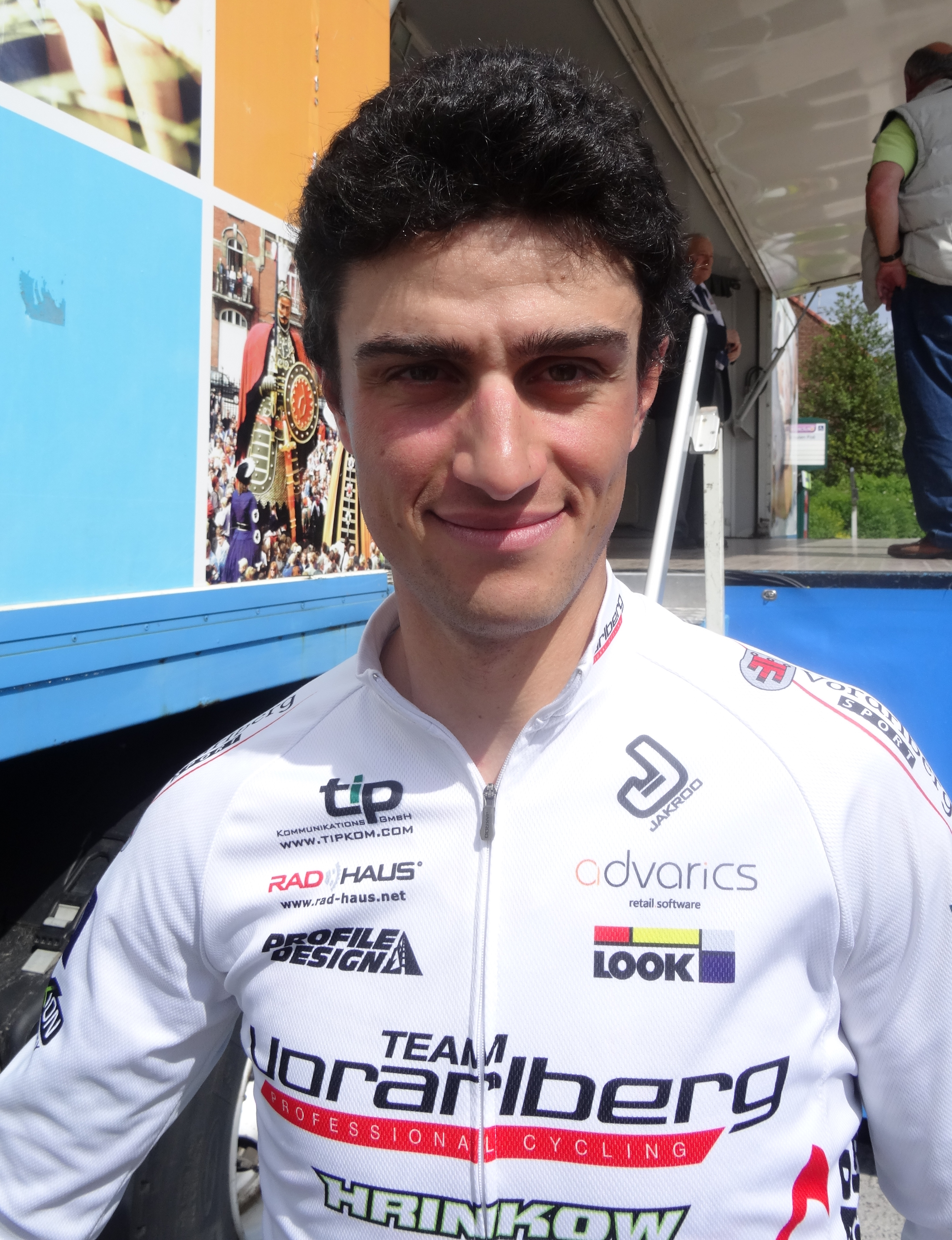
- Baldo in 2014

Personal information
- Full name: Nicolas Baldo
- Born: 10 June 1984 (age 42) Issoire, France

Cycling career
- Sport: Cycling
- Current team: Retired
- Discipline: Road
- Role: Rider

Amateur teams
- 2005–2006: Le Cheylard Formation Cyclisme
- 2007: VC Lyon-Vaulx-en-Velin
- 2008: Super Sport 35–ACNC

Professional teams
- 2009: Continental Team Differdange
- 2010–2013: Atlas Personal–BMC
- 2014–2015: Team Vorarlberg
- 2016: Team Roth
- 2017–2019: HP BTP–Auber93

Nicolas Baldo (born 10 June 1984 in Issoire) is a French former professional cyclist.

== Major results ==
2006
1st Overall Circuit des Trois Provinces

1st Stage 2

1st Stage 2 Tour des Pays de Savoie
10th Chrono Champenois
2008
1st Stage 4 Tour Nivernais Morvan
2009
1st Stage 4 Giro della Regione Friuli Venezia Giulia
8th Overall Circuit des Ardennes
10th Duo Normand (with Sébastien Harbonnier)
2010
2nd Overall Rhône-Alpes Isère Tour
2nd La Roue Tourangelle
6th Overall Circuit des Ardennes
10th Chrono Champenois
2011
4th Chrono Champenois
9th Overall Tour du Gévaudan Languedoc-Roussillon
2012
1st Overall An Post Rás

1st Stage 6

2013
1st Paris–Mantes-en-Yvelines
4th Overall Tour du Gévaudan Languedoc-Roussillon
5th Tour de Berne
6th Overall Rhône-Alpes Isère Tour

1st Stage 1

7th Tour du Jura
9th Chrono des Nations
2014
2nd Overall Czech Cycling Tour

1st Mountains classification

4th Tour du Jura
9th Chrono des Nations
2015
1st Paris–Mantes-en-Yvelines
6th Raiffeisen Grand Prix
8th Grand Prix des Marbriers
2017
4th Grand Prix d'Isbergues
