= Wilczewski =

Wilczewski is a Polish surname. Notable people with the surname include:

- David Wilczewski (1952–2009), American-Swedish jazz saxophonist
- Mieczysław Wilczewski (1932–1993), Polish cyclist
- Piotr Wilczewski (born 1978), Polish boxer
