= Romet =

Polish bicycle manufacturer

Coordinates: 53°07′04″N 17°58′52″E

Romet sp. zo.o.
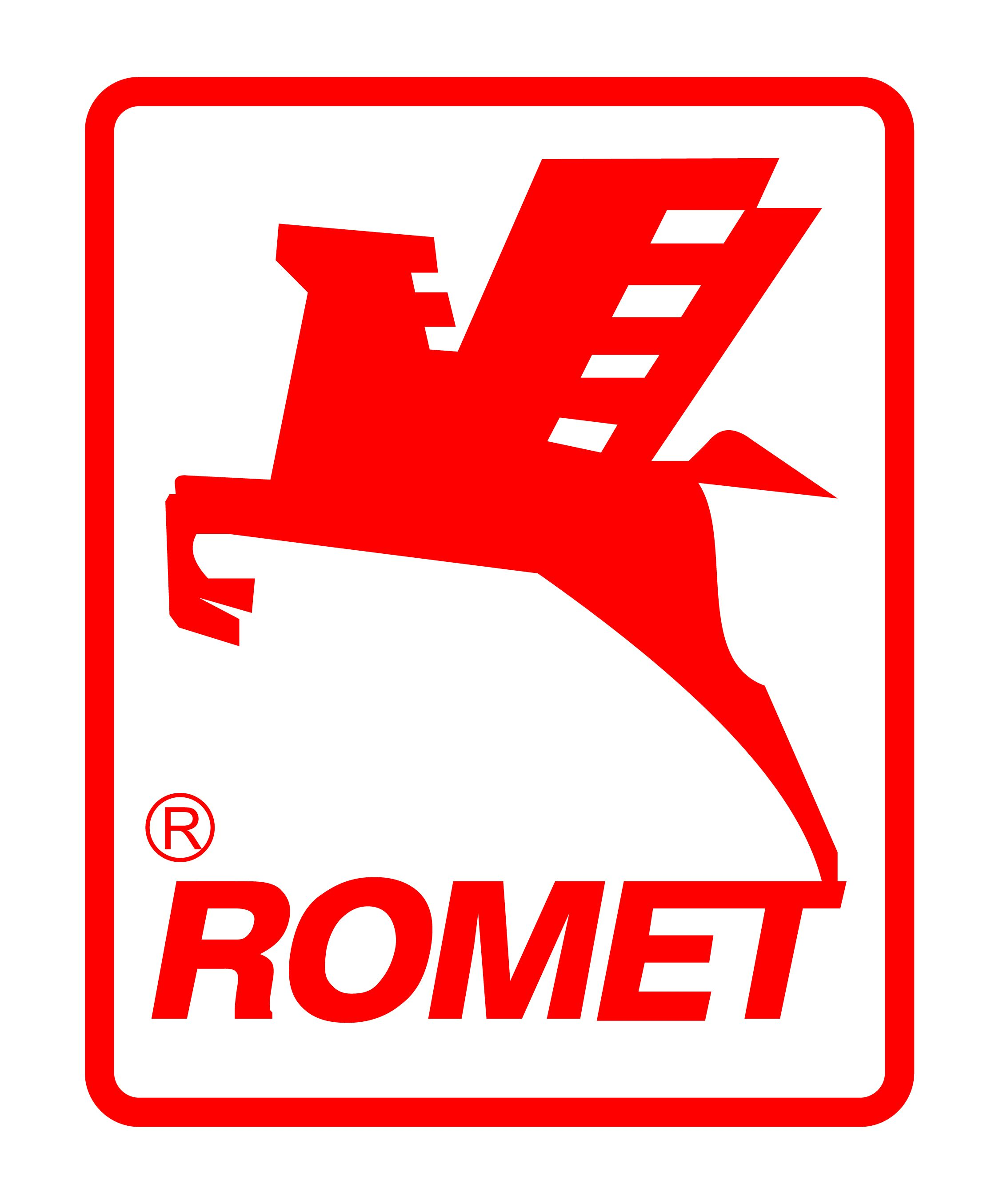
- Formerly: Romet Bicycle Factory
- Company type: Public company till 2005, Privately held company since 2006
- Industry: Motorcycle industry
- Founded: September 15, 1948 in Bydgoszcz, Poland
- Founder: Polish government
- Fate: Acquired
- Successors: Romet sp. z o.o., previously Arkus & Romet Group
- Headquarters: Bydgoszcz, then Dębica, Poland
- Key people: Wiesław Grzyb
- Products: Bicycles, mopeds, scooters, motorcycles
- Revenue: PLN 322.7 million (€70.2 million)
- Owner: Wiesław Grzyb
- Number of employees: 8,000 (1975)
- Website: www.romet.pl

Romet or Romet sp. zo.o. is a Polish bicycle manufacturer based in Dębica. It was originally established as Romet Bicycle Factory (Polish: Zakłady Rowerowe "Romet") in Bydgoszcz in 1948. The company changed names several times, following mergers of smaller pre-war bicycle plants in Bydgoszcz and in Poznań, Czechowice-Dziedzice and later with factories in Jastrowie, Kowalewo and Wałcz. In addition to bikes, the firm produced mopeds, scooters and motorcycles.

Declared insolvent in 2005, the brand was purchased in 2006 by the Polish company "Arkus & Romet Group" (now "Romet sp. z o.o.") based in Dębica. As of 2023, the company provided products to 50 countries globally.

== History ==
=== Bike industry before 1945 ===
The oldest registered Polish bicycle factories in Poland were Wicher in Łódź established in 1891 and B. Wohren, established in 1893, in Warsaw.

- Tornedo company

In 1904, a bike company was set up by Wilhelm Tornow in Bydgoszcz, while in Warsaw Kazimierz Lipiński's Ormonde started in 1913, and in 1917, Franciszek Zawadzki opened a bicycle and parts factory.

After WWI, Tornow started to expand his workshop located at 49-51 Dworcowa Street. In 1924, the plant was transformed into the "Tornedo Bicycle Factory", where bikes were assembled with parts imported from the Weimar Republic. Later on, some components were produced locally, employing about 50 employees.

At the world exhibitions in Florence (1929) and Brussels (1930), Tornedo bicycles won gold medals and "Grand Prix" titles. After the Great Depression, the bike industry significantly expanded and modernized: "Tornedo" workforce increased to 500 people in 1939 and the firm opened a second facility at Swiętej Trojcy Street. Annual output before WWII reached 5,500 bicycles.

- Pomorska Fabryka Rowerów Willy Jahr

The Jahhr family had a bike shop at 45 Dworcowa Street, not far from competing Tornedo. Willy, having established a factory in 1926, launched a large bicycle assembly plant two years later with his partner Wasilewski, at 89 Nakielska street. The facility had a surface of more than 3,000 square metres (0.74 acres). Willy Jahr's products were awarded in 1930, at the International Exhibition in Brussels, where they received the "Great Gold Medal". The 1930s supported the development of the industry and Willy Jahr could significantly increase his production.

In 1928, Feliks Więcek, the winner of the first Tour de Pologne, had been riding a Willy Jahr's "Rekord" bicycle. The heyday of the firm was reached between the second half of the 1930s and the outbreak of the WWII. At its glory, the company employed up to 100 employees and produced as many as 18,700 bicycles (1938).

- Other companies

From 1937 onwards, Fabryka Wyrobów Metalowo-Masowych Wacława Millnera produced bicycles from its plant at Mazowiecka street. Likewise, Lucjan Sokołowski from Fabryka Wyrobów Metalowych Fema manufactured bicycle parts (gears and cranksets) on the site then located at 11 Warmińskiego street.

Some components were imported from other cities in Poland (Warsaw, Poznań and Czechowice-Dziedzice). Just before the outbreak of World War II, 130,000 bikes were produced annually in Bydgoszcz, which accounted for 60% of domestic output. Outside of Bydgoszcz, main Polish firms were located in:

- Grodno (Kresowa Fabryka Rowerów i Motocykli "Niemen");
- Poznań (Inwentia);
- Stęszew (Patria);
- Katowice (Ebeco);
- Częstochowa (Motros);
- Radom (FB "Łucznik" Radom);
- Warsaw (PZL).

=== Second World War activity ===
During the German occupation, the production of bicycles and parts in Bydgoszcz dropped down to 12,000 units in 1942 and the industry employment dwindled to 350 people.

Facilities started the production of parts for submarines and other equipment for the German war effort.

In April 1945, Soviet military authorities entered the "Tornedo" bicycle factory on the list of 30 economic facilities in Bydgoszcz planned to be dismantled and exported back to Soviet Union. Such deportations were circumvented after the Polish authorities intervened towards the representative of the USSR Economic Mission in Warsaw in May 1945.

=== 1945–1955: Initial activity ===
After the end of the war, Bydgoszcz concentrated most of the national production of bicycles (20,000 units), other sites being Łódź and Wirek in Silesia. In 1947, with the introduction of cooperative work between plants, the production reached 60,000 bikes, however, the offer was limited to four types of black touring models.

At the end of 1945, a "State Bicycle Factory" (Polish: Państwowe Fabryki Rowerów, PaFaRo) was established and produced units until the mid-1950s.

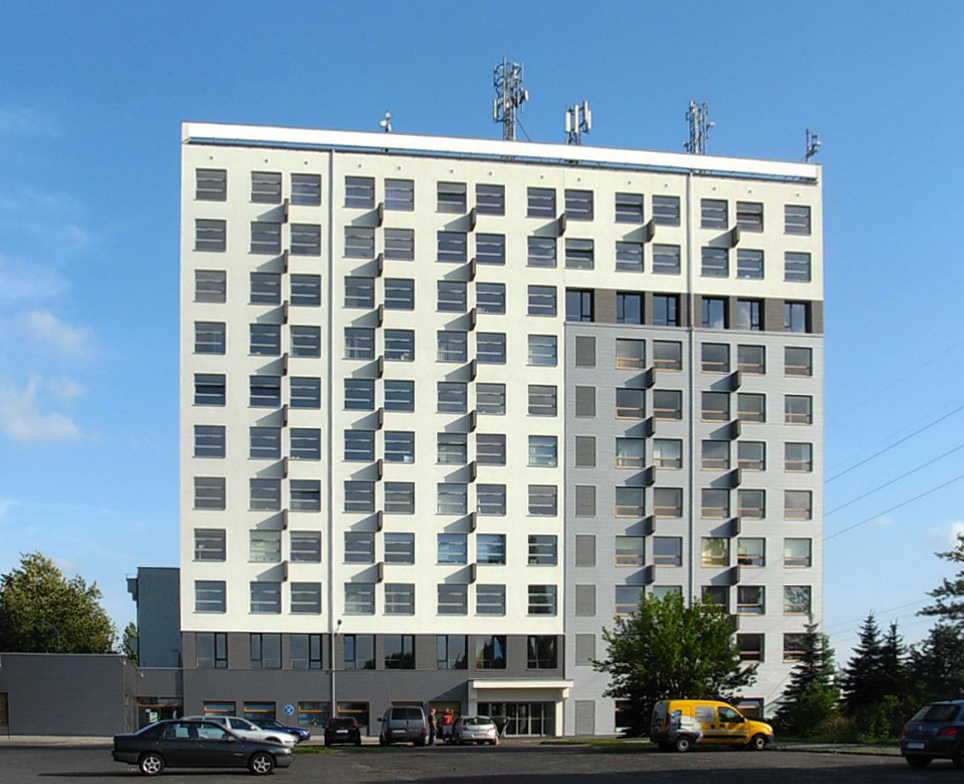
Former seat of "Romet" at 246 Fordńska street, Bydgoszcz

On September 15, 1948, the entire Polish bicycle industry was consolidated under the state-owned enterprise called "United Bicycle Works" (Polish: Zjednoczone Zakłady Rowerowe, ZZR). Having its seat in Bydgoszcz at 2, Fordońska street, ZZR initially consisted of (main sites):

- 4 plants from Bydgoszcz under the management of Romet (Tornedo, Wacław Millner, Fema and Pomorska Fabryka Rowerów);
- one plant in Poznań;
- one in Czechowice-Dziedzice. On January 1, 1972, this site was transferred to Fabryka Samochodów Małolitrażowych (FSM) in Bielsko-Biała. It later produced, among others, elements for the FSO Syrena. Today, the FSM, renamed "Fiat Auto Poland", is still active: it belongs to Stellantis Poland (ex-"Fiat Auto Poland SA").

ZZR produced in 1949, 91,000 cycles and 100,000 in 1950, declined in 6 models. This year, bicycles began to be exported. In the end, in 1955, output already exceeded 200,000 pieces.

In 1953, ZZR was structured with 9 departments in Bydgoszcz (employing 1936 people), 1 department in Poznań (210 employees), 1 in Czechowice-Dziedzice (377 employees) and 1 in Luboń. In Nakielska street plant in Bydgoszcz, a specific workshop for manufacturing of racing bicycles "Bałtyk" was created. Initially, "Bałtyk" bikes were used by the national team, on events like the "Peace Race" or the "Tour de Pologne". Likewise, Romet plant produced 250 "Jaguar" racing bikes per month from 1954 onwards .

While the 1949-1955 economic strategy for Romet anticipated a four-fold increase in production, without any modernization of the machine park, it was however decided in 1953 to build a new production plant in Bydgoszcz.

=== 1955–1990: Growth ===
On December 20, 1956, the scheme of a new production complex at 246 Fordońska street, in the eastern outskirts of Bydgoszcz, was designed by Biuro Projektów Budownictwa in Warsaw. The project comprised 3 halls and auxiliary facilities: construction works lasted from 1957 to 1963. The production line equipment was partly imported from abroad (East Germany, United Kingdom, France, West Germany), the rest of the machines was replaced with local devices made on the spot by the firm.

The new "Department Nr.10" was operating as early as 1959 and in 1961, the first batch of bicycles were assembled on the new production line. Between 1955 and 1960, production doubled (from 210,000 to 438,000 bicycles), thanks to the use of large-scale automated lines.

At that time, the logo of Romet was designed in the shape of a Pegasus taking off.

In 1960, the Romet R&D section at 2 Fordońska street started cooperation with the "Torpedo" plant in Czechoslovakia to pioneer attractive solutions that would improve the quality of bicycles.

In the 1960s, the production time for a tourist bike was shortened from 6 to 5 hours, and for the "Komar" moped from 32 to 17 hours. Despite progress advances in automation, about 25 to 35% of the time on the line was dedicated to manual work.

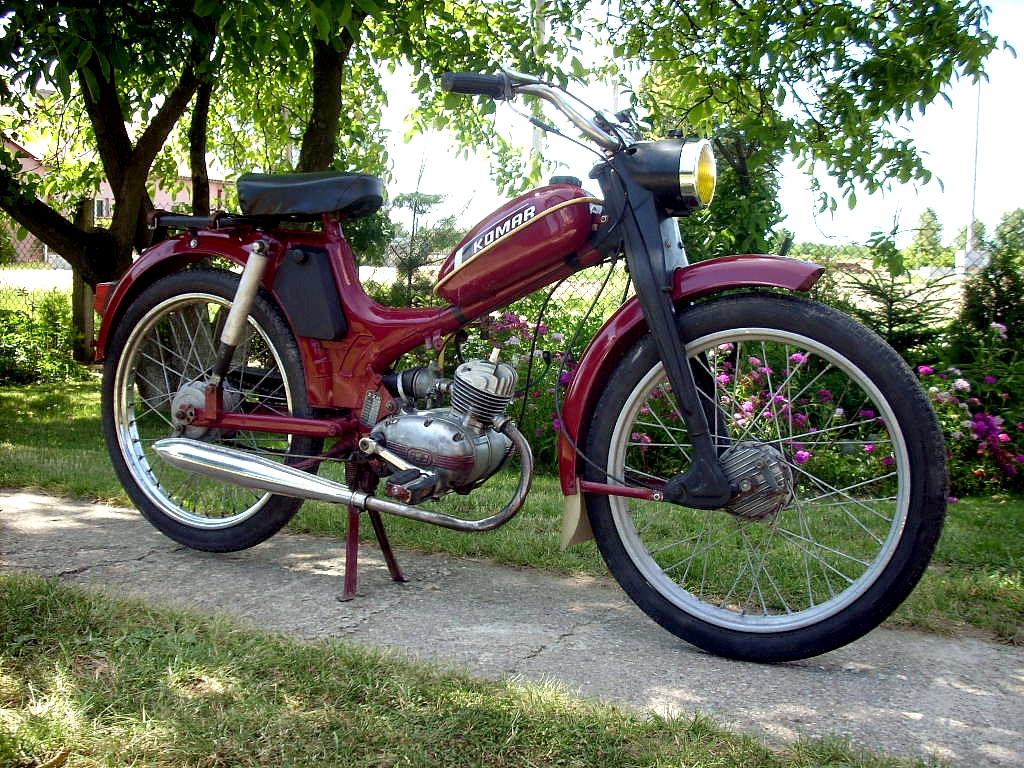
Moped "Komar 2330", 1970

In 1975, ZZR employed 8,000 people across the country, of which around 5,500 thousand in Bydgoszcz, 1,300 in Poznań and 700 in Kowalewo.

In 1969, ZZR was renamed Romet Bicycle Works (Polish: Zakłady Rowerowe "Romet"). In 1974, Romet was subordinated to the "Union of Mechanized Home Appliances" (Polish: Zjednoczenie Przemysłu Precyzyjnego „Predom") or Predom. The entire branch remained under the administrative and decision-making control of the "Ministry of Machine Industry".

A partial automation of the production line was attempted using mostly domestic technological resources: for instance, saddles were manufactured by Bydgoszcz Zachem Chemical Plant. Notwithstanding those efforts, the quality degraded, losing market shares in Western countries, but these were made up for by sales to Eastern Bloc countries. In effect, domestic products were inferior to foreign ones (modernity of lines, careful finishing details). In the years 1971–1975, 19 models were classified as technically obsolete and the numbers rose to 25 between 1976 and 1980.

In 1976, the average machine park was 13 years old and the company could not keep up with global trends in terms of technological progress. The situation was temporarily mitigated (1976–1980) with the set up of new automatic and semi-automatic assembly lines, minimizing manual work.

At Romet's heyday in the mid-1980s, Bydgoszcz was nicknamed the European Bicycle Capital.

==== Exports ====
Since the 1960s, fabrication has been exported to over 50 countries, albeit mainly within the Soviet bloc. Some western markets were however reached: France, United Kingdom, Netherlands, West Germany, Sweden, Finland, Greece, Turkey, but also in Asia and North and Latin America. At its peak of activity, ZZR had been exporting 30% of its production (440,000 units) towards Western countries. As a matter of fact, these countries concentrated 90% of the firm's selling abroad.

Some batches of bicycles were also sent to Africa and Middle East while most of the mopeds were sold to Hungary.

In Afghanistan, Bydgoszcz engineers launched the country's first bicycle assembly plant, built on the basis of a Polish blueprint. From 1959 onwards, this factory also produced the "Romet Jaguar" racing cycle using imported equipment.

==== Output ====
In 1959, the production of "Komar" mopeds was launched: at the end of the 1960s, 100,000 ones were produced annually, including exports to Sweden, Hungary and West Germany. In 1961, the first batch of 100,000 units was sold to the American market, providing to Romet (ZZR) a steady expansion in Canada, United States and several countries of Latin America.

In 1970, 940,000 bicycles and 85,000 mopeds were produced, of which 25% were sold abroad.

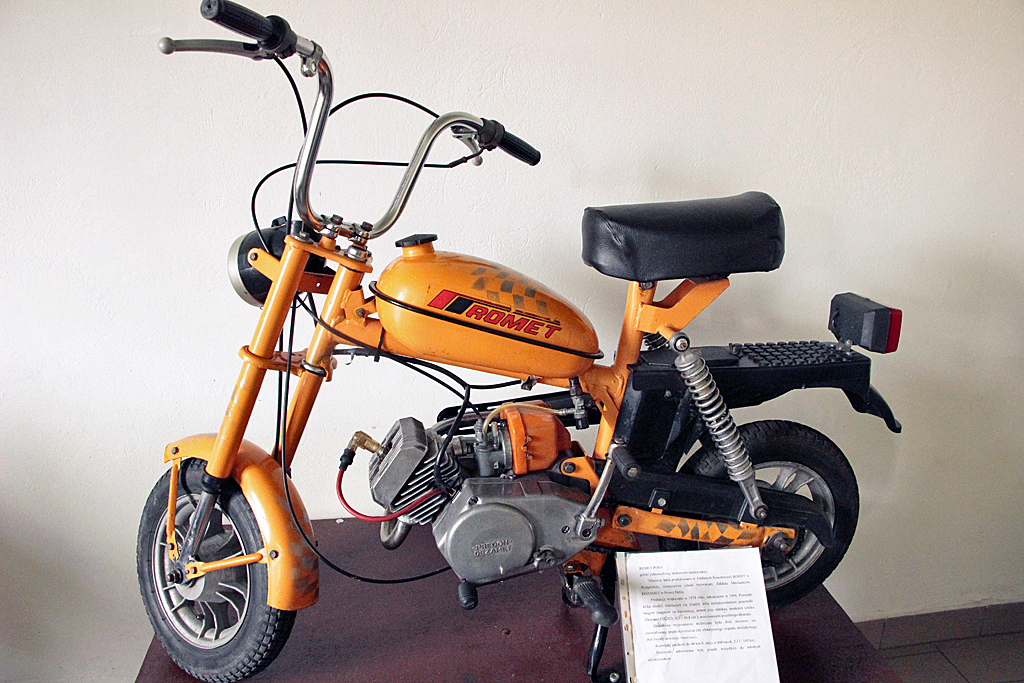
"Romet Pony"

In the 1970s, production reached 1 million units per year: 100 types of bicycles and 5 types of mopeds were available. Poland was then the largest producer of bicycles in Europe. Furthermore, the company offered sleds for children until the early 1970s, ski sledges, car parts, components for pedalos and motorcycle spare parts.

The plant in Kowalewo produced circa 360,000 folding bicycles and in 1978, the site of Bydgoszcz manufactured "motorynki" Romet Pony, a miniature moped, intended for young people.

In the years 1971–1975, 41 types of bicycles were manufactured by Romet, including 14 new models.

In the early 1980s, "Ogar" moped model, equipped with Czechoslovakia-produced Jawa 223 motor was launched.

In 1983, output topped 922,000 bikes and 107,000 mopeds, with 13% of production going to export.

In 1988–1990, the offer was expanded with the "Romet Mińsk 125", assembled from Soviet parts.

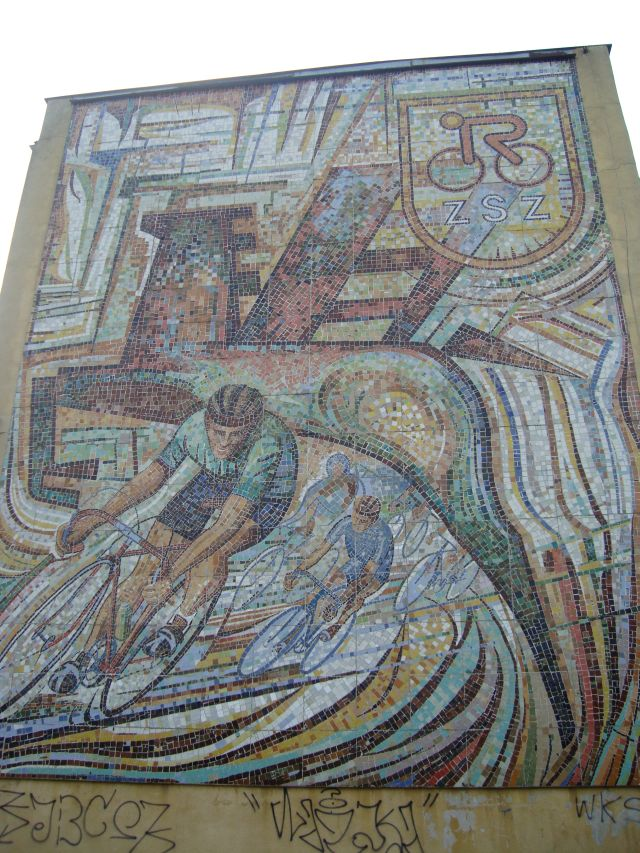
"Romet" Mosaic at the former Vocational School in Bydgoszcz

==== Social activities ====
From 1961, ZZR opened a school complex at 27 Wiślana street in Bydgoszcz. There operated a vocational school, a technical school and a vocational college. One can still see on a facade a mosaic depicting cyclists speeding against the background of stylized "Romet" pegasus logo.

In the 1970s, Romet had a network of recreation centers for its employees:

- in Wilkasy by Lake Niegocin;
- in Borsk at Lake Wdzydze;
- in Jastrowie on Lake Cichy:
- on Lake Koronowskie nearby Koronowo;
- at Wójtowice in the Kłodzko Valley;
- by the Baltic Sea at Niechorze, Ustka, Dąbki;
- in the mountains (Zakopane, Głuchołazy).

Every year, a cycling race for children, "The Magic of Two Wheels" (Polish: Czar dwóch kółek), was organized in Bydgoszcz by the company, with the help of the local daily paper "Dziennik Wieczorny".

Romet factory has been the place where Bydgoszcz branch of Solidarity Union was born. Jan Rulewski, now a Polish Senator, worked there as a mechanical engineer: in 1980, he was appointed as the Bydgoszcz representative of the Solidarity Union. Another prominent Solidarity activist, Antoni Tokarczuk, had been working in this plant from 1975 to 1990.

=== 1990–2005: Years of decline ===
In 1991, the company was transformed into a joint-stock company of the State Treasury, Zakłady Rowerowe "Romet" S.A.. With the opening of the Polish bicycle market to foreign competition, Romet found itself over-burdened with its old-fashioned infrastructure and a large number of employees. This dire economic situation led to a failed privatization in 1994: most of the employees were laid off and the production was dramatically reduced.

Bicycles imported from the Far East were sold at prices much lower than those produced domestically. In 1996, "Romet S.A." reduced its production capacity by 69% and started to sell assets:

- in 1998, the Bydgoszcz plant declared bankruptcy. In 2002, a piece of the plot was purchased to build Bydgoszcz's IKEA retail area which opened in 2015.
- the site in Wałcz was kept operating;
- Arkus & Romet Group acquired plants in Jastrowie (1999) and in Kowalewo (2000).

Arkus & Romet Group Sp. z o. o. was established in 1991 by Wiesław Grzyb, an entrepreneur associated with the bicycle industry, as "Arkus S.C.". Initially, the company aimed at importing units, mainly from Ukraine. "Arkus S.C." established its first factory in Podgrodzie near Dębica in 1995. The Jastrowie plant, once purchased, was specialized in the production of children's and youth bicycles.

Wiesław Grzyb also purchased the rights to use the "Romet" brand and model names "Jubilat" and "Wigry". In 2001, the company was set up as a private limited company.

In 2005, while Zakłady Rowerowe "Romet" S.A. was deleted from the Polish Court Register, Arkus & Romet Group sp. z o.o. was established from the merger of "Arkus Sp. z o. o." and "Fabryka Rowerów Romet – Jastrowie Sp. z o.o.".

=== 2006–present time: Rebirth ===
In 2006, Arkus & Romet Group took entirely over "Romet" trademarks rights. In 2007, in Podgrodzie's factory, the production of "Romet" scooters and motorcycles was launched, adjacent to the bicycle production line.

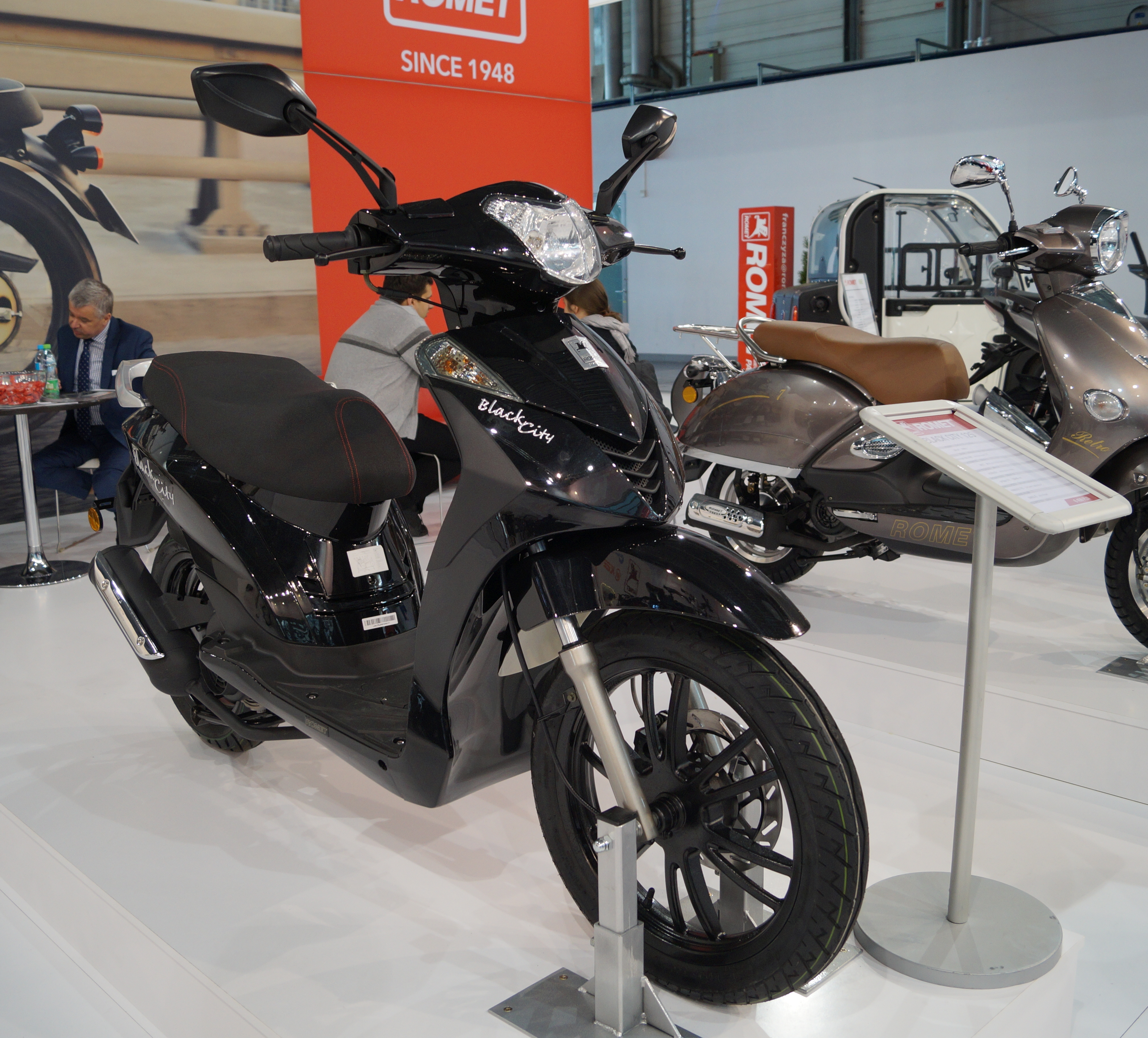
Romet scooter "Black City 125"

At the end of 2008, the bicycles under the "Romet" brand resumed selling. A year later, Arkus & Romet Group introduced the new "Romet" bicycle collection to the market, symbolizing the revival of the Pegasus-logo bikes. In 2010, a prototype of electric microcar, the Romet 4E, was introduced: its production started in 2012. In 2011, the number of new "Romet" models exceeded the number of models developed by the company before its bankruptcy.

In 2020, Arkus & Romet Group Sp. z o. o. became Romet Sp. z o.o..

The annual output in 2021 was approximately 400,000 bikes, representing more than 30% of the Polish domestic production. The bicycles are manufactured in two sites in Poland: in Podgrodzie (where is located the seat of Romet) and Jastrowie. The logistics center is settled in Kowalewo; the ensemble covers an area of 65,000 square metres (16 acres).

In 2022, Romet acquired Prorowery, a Polish chain of bicycle shops.

From May 2018 to March 2019, an exhibition called Rower po bydgosku (Polish: Bike in Bydgoszcz) gathered 11 original "Romet" mopeds; it had been held at Bydgoszcz Exploseum.

In 2022, more people are working on the former plot of Bydgoszcz "Romet" than at its peak activity in the 1970s. As a matter of fact, the area now harbours many thriving companies (IKEA, iQor, Inter Cars, Manex Galwanizernia, AM Optical Group).

== Characteristics ==
=== Naming ===
- 1945–1948: PaFaRo (Polish: Państwowe Fabryki Rowerów), National Bicycle Factories.
- 1948–1969: Zjednoczone Zakłady Rowerowe, (United Bicycle Works).
- 1969–1974: Zakłady Rowerowe "Romet", ("Romet" Bicycle Works).
- 1974–1991: Zakłady Rowerowe "Predom-Romet", ("Predom-Romet" Bicycle Works).
- 1991–2005: Zakłady Rowerowe "Romet" S.A.
- 2005–2020: Arkus & Romet Group sp. z o.o.
- Since 2020: Romet Sp. z o.o.

=== Models ===
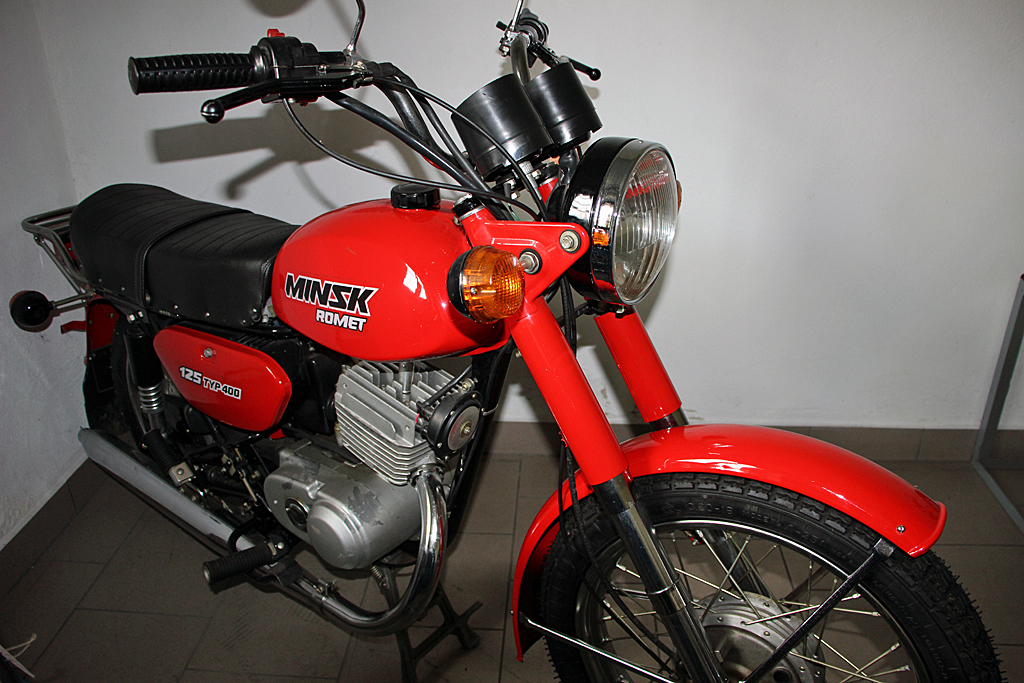
Romet Minsk 125

- 1948–2005

During its first period of operation, the company manufactured more than 125 models of bicycles, 35 models of mopeds and one type of motorcycle, the "Romet Mińsk 125". Most popular bike models were Wigry, Jubilat, Zenit, Konsul, Gazela, Kometa, Universal, Reksio or Flaming.

- Since 2005

Since its revival, "Romet Sp. z o.o." produced more than 140 types of bikes (56 under the "Arkus brand", 30 "Delta" brand, 20 "Romet" brand, 34 "Univega" brand), 28 models of mopeds, 24 models of motorcycles and 4 ATVs.

== See also ==
- Bydgoszcz
- Podgrodzie
- Dębica
- Bicycle industry
- Jan Rulewski
- Antoni Tokarczuk

== Bibliography ==
- 60 lat Zakładów Rowerowy "Romet" 1924 – 1984 [60 years of the "Romet" Bicycle Works 1924 – 1984] (in Polish). Bydgoszcz: Romet. 1984.
- Tarnowska, Anna (June 10, 2013). "Historia bydgoskiego przemysłu rowerowego". bydgoszcz.wyborcza.pl. Agora SA.
