= Janusz Kowalski =

Janusz Kowalski may refer to:

- Janusz Kowalski (cyclist)
- Janusz Kowalski (politician)
