= Paris–Mantes Cycliste =

French one-day road cycling race

Race details
- Date: April
- Region: France
- Discipline: Road race
- Competition: UCI Europe Tour
- Type: One-day race
- Organiser: Association Sportive Mantaise
- Web site: www.parismantesenyvelines.fr

History
- First edition: 1945
- Editions: 73 (as of 2018)
- First winner: Émile Carrara (FRA)
- Most wins: Pierre Drancourt (FRA); Nicolas Baldo (FRA); (2 wins)
- Most recent: Maxime Jarnet (FRA)

Paris–Mantes Cycliste, previously known as Paris–Mantes-en-Yvelines, is a road bicycle race held annually in France. It is organized as a 1.2 event on the UCI Europe Tour.

== Winners ==
Year	Winner	Second	Third
1945	(France) Émile Carrara	(France) Henri Defraire	(France) Roger Prevotal
1946	(France) Jean Ferrand	(France) Charles Coste	(France) René Leboulanger
1947	(France) Louis Longo	(France) Jean Baldassari	(France) Guy Solente
1948	(France) Roger Hureaux	(France) Jacques Prevotal	(France) Marcel Charpentier
1949	(Italy) Nello Sforacchi	(France) Marcel Ranc	(France) Jean Mazzoleni
1950	(France) Valentin Gerussi	(France) René Cador	(France) André Vagner
1951	(France) Jacques Decroix	(France) Kresiak	(France) Bernard Bourgeot
1952	(France) Maurice Le Boulch	(France) Jacques Bunel	(France) Michel Bon
1953	(France) Gérard Pujol	(France) Marcel Michel	(France) Georges Roux
1954	(France) Pierre Brun	(France) Charles Lajoie	(France) Michel Vermeulin
1955	(France) Orphée Meneghini	(France) Pierre Brun	(France) André Alvarez
1957	(France) René Pavard	(France) Peynaud	(France) Jean-Claude Lecante
1958	(France) Claude Omnes	(France) Gilbert Lasseron	(France) Robert Sciardis
1959	(France) Alain Le Grèves	(France) Claude Delamain	(Portugal) Azevedo Maia
1960	(France) Bernard Launois	(France) Henri Duez	(France) Jacques Rebiffe
1961	(France) Bernard Brian	(France) Aimé Le Gouallec	(France) Jean-Pierre Van Haverbeke
1962	(France) Pierre Martin	(United Kingdom) John Geddes	(France) Jean Hoffmann
1963	(France) Jean Arze	(France) Aimable Denhez	(France) Pierre Jacquelot
1964	(France) Michel Goeury	(France) Byers	(France) Hinault
1965	(France) Bernard Guyot	(France) Jean-Claude Maroilleau	(France) Jean-Pierre Puccianti
1966	(France) Christian Moreau	(France) Jean-Pierre Puccianti	(France) Jean Croquison
1967	(France) Robert Bouloux	(Morocco) Mohamed El Gourch	(France) Gérard Demont
1968	(France) Francis Perez	(Netherlands) Henk Hiddinga	(France) Jean-Jacques Cornet
1969	(France) Gérard Briend	(France) Bernard Dupuch	(France) Jackie Quentin
1970	(France) Paul-Louis Combes	(France) Alain Racape	(France) Jean-Claude Blocher
1971	(France) Régis Ovion	(France) André Corbeau	(France) Paul-Louis Combes
1972	(France) Patrick Béon	(France) Jacques Boulas	(France) Rachel Dard
1973	(France) Michel Demore	(France) Alain Meslet	(France) Marc Merdy
1974	(France) Hubert Linard	(France) Bernard Vallet	(France) Jean Chassang
1975	(France) Rachel Dard	(France) Gérard Colinelli	(France) Michel Herbault
1976	(France) José Beurel	(France) Michel Herbault	(France) Jean-Luc Blanchardon
1977	(France) Didier Bourrier	(France) Jean-Pierre Bouteille	(France) Marc Merdy
1978	(France) Denis Bonnin	(France) Yves Carbonnier	(France) Bernard Pineau
1979	(France) Hervé Desriac	(France) Philippe Badouard	(France) Plaut
1980	(France) Philippe Badouard	(Republic of Ireland) Stephen Roche	(Denmark) Hans-Henrik Ørsted
1981	(France) Alain Gallopin	(France) Fabien De Vooght	(France) Laurent Fignon
1982	(France) Philippe Lauraire	(France) Thierry Barrault	(France) Franck Pineau
1983	(France) Philippe Bouvatier	(France) Laurent Eudeline	(France) Bruno De Santi
1984	(France) François Lemarchand	(France) Alain Leigniel	(France) Thierry Casas
1985	(France) Bruno Huger	(France) Thierry Casas	(France) Stéphane Guay
1986	(France) Claude Carlin	(France) Marc Poncel	(France) Philippe Goubin
1987	(United Kingdom) Wayne Bennington	(France) Hervé Desriac	(France) Franck Petiteau
1988	(France) Gérard Aviegne	(France) Pascal Rota	(France) Thierry Dupuy
1989	(Poland) Henryk Krawczyk	(France) Richard Virenque	(France) René Foucachon
1990	(France) André Urbanek	(France) Jean-Philippe Dojwa	(France) Jean-Cyril Robin
1991	(Poland) Slawomir Krawczyk	(France) Denis Moretti	(France) Jérôme Gourgousse
1992	(Estonia) Jaan Kirsipuu	(Estonia) Lauri Aus	(Republic of Ireland) Conor Henry
1993	(France) Gilles Bouvard	(France) Bernard Jousselin	(France) Franck Morelle
1994	(France) Christophe Moreau	(France) Thierry Ferrer	(France) Gilles Maignan
1995	(France) Eric Frutoso	(France) Pierrick Gillereau	(France) Vincent Templier
1996	(Switzerland) Bruno Boscardin	(France) Pascal Peyramaure	(France) Thierry Marichal
1997	(Estonia) Jaan Kirsipuu	(France) Stéphane Barthe	(France) Damien Nazon
1998	(France) Lénaïc Olivier	(France) Ludovic Martin	(France) Cédric Loué
1999	(France) Grégory Lapalud	(France) Cédric Van Overschelde	(France) Grégory Faghel
2000	(Poland) David Krupa	(France) Grégory Faghel	(France) Jérôme Bouchet
2001	(France) Jérôme Pineau	(Ukraine) Yuriy Krivtsov	(Poland) Łukasz Bodnar
2002	(Canada) Ryder Hesjedal	(France) Rony Martias	(Poland) Łukasz Bodnar
2003	(France) Serge Canouet	(France) Benoit Geoffroy	(France) Cyril Lemoine
2004	(France) William Bonnet	(Canada) Dominique Rollin	(France) Fabrice Jeandesboz
2005	(France) Maxime Méderel	(France) Jonathan Hivert	(France) Renaud Pioline
2006	(Russia) Alexander Serov	(France) Thierry David	(Moldova) Alexandre Sabalin
2007	(France) Niels Brouzes	(France) Maxime Méderel	(France) Mathieu Drujon
2008	(France) Florian Morizot	(France) Guillaume Blot	(France) Mathieu Simon
2009	(France) Pierre Drancourt	(Germany) Hannes Blank	(France) Benjamin Giraud
2010	(France) Yoann Bagot	(France) Jérémy Ortiz	(France) Pierre Drancourt
2011	(France) Pierre Drancourt	(France) Johan Le Bon	(France) Jean-Marc Bideau
2012	(New Zealand) Alex Meenhorst	(France) Romain Mathéou	(Germany) Florian Bissinger
2013	(France) Nicolas Baldo	(France) Benoît Daeninck	(Belgium) Gert Lodewijks
2014	(France) David Menut	(France) Cyrille Patoux	(France) Romain Combaud
2015	(France) Nicolas Baldo	(France) Erwann Corbel	(France) Romain Barroso
2016	(France) Paul Ourselin	(France) Ronan Racault	(France) Mickaël Guichard
2017	(France) Fabien Canal	(France) Clément Patat	(France) Clément Penven
2018	(Belgium) Gianni Marchand	(France) Baptiste Constantin	(France) Florian Maitre
2019	(France) Aurélien Le Lay	(France) Ronan Racault	(Spain) Adrià Moreno
2020	No race		
2021	(France) Maxime Jarnet	(France) Hugo Théot	(France) Jacques Lebreton
