= Steven Tronet =

French cyclist

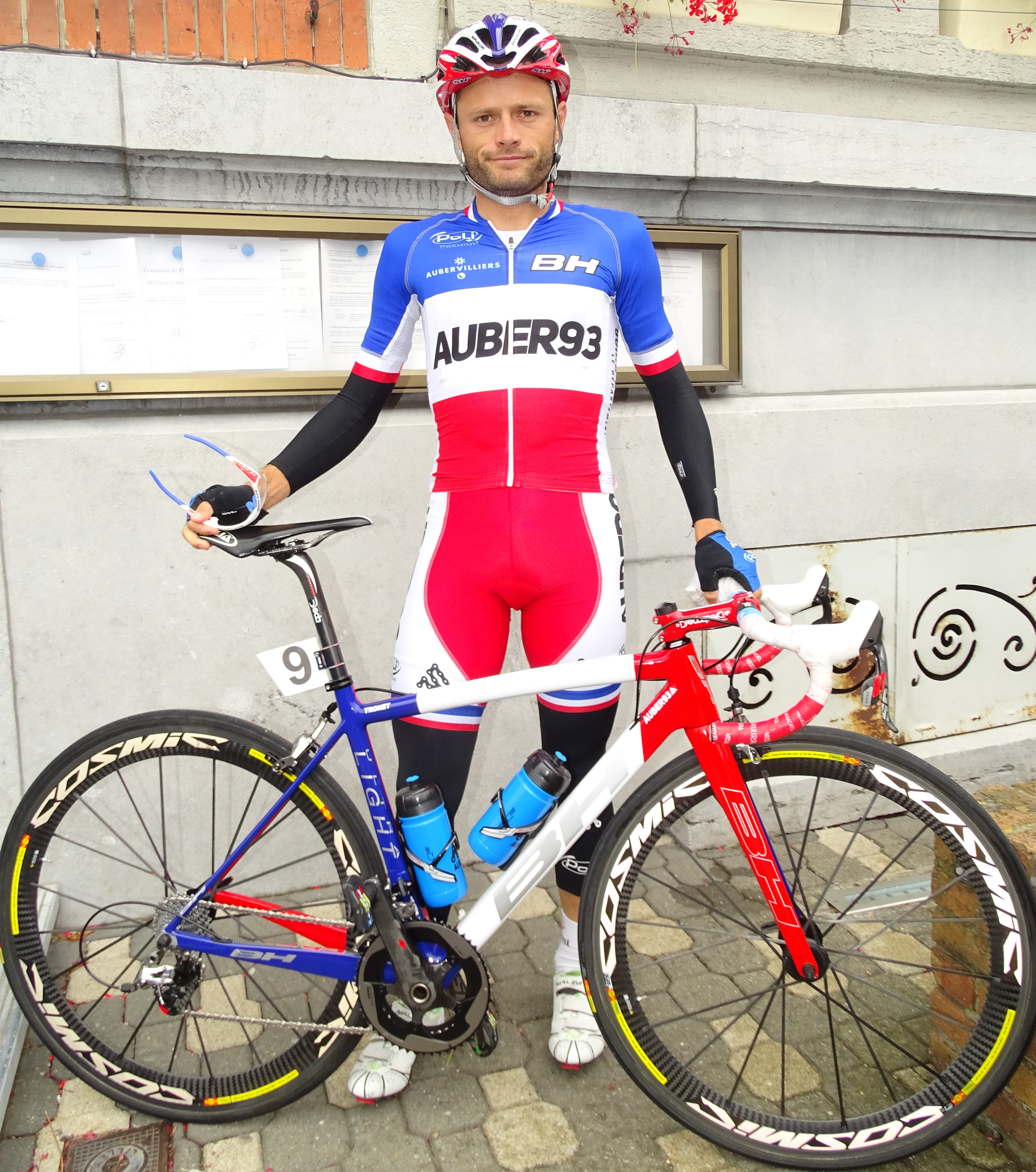
- Tronet in his national champions kit and with custom bike at the 2015 Grand Prix de la Ville de Pérenchies

Personal information
- Born: 14 October 1986 (age 40) Calais, France
- Height: 1.75 m (5 ft 9 in)
- Weight: 67 kg (148 lb)

Cycling career
- Sport: Cycling
- Discipline: Road
- Role: Rider

Amateur teams
- ?: UVC Calais
- 2005–2006: VC Roubaix
- 2019: CC Nogent-sur-Oise
- 2022: UVC Calais

Professional teams
- 2007–2011: Roubaix–Lille Métropole
- 2012–2015: Auber 93
- 2016: Fortuneo–Vital Concept
- 2017: Armée de Terre
- 2018: Roubaix–Lille Métropole

Major wins
- One-day races and classics National Road Race Championships (2015)

Steven Tronet (born 14 October 1986) is a French road cyclist, who most recently rode for French amateur team UVC Calais. Tronet previously competed as a professional from 2007 until 2018.

== Major results ==
2005
7th Grand Prix de la ville de Pérenchies
2006
1st Grand Prix Assevent
1st Gommegnies Grand Prix
2007
9th Tour de Vendée
10th Overall Four Days of Dunkirk
2008
1st Stage 1 Ronde de l'Oise
8th Tour du Doubs
8th Boucles de l'Aulne
2009
6th Tro-Bro Léon
7th Cholet-Pays de Loire
7th Grand Prix d'Isbergues
8th Polynormande
2010
1st Overall Ronde de l'Oise
8th Le Samyn
8th Boucles de l'Aulne
2011
1st Tour du Canton de Saint-Ciers
3rd Overall Boucles de la Mayenne
3rd Route Adélie de Vitré
6th Boucles de l'Aulne
7th Overall Étoile de Bessèges
2012
2nd Overall Circuit de Lorraine

1st Stage 5

2nd Paris–Connerré
4th Paris–Troyes
6th Route Adélie de Vitré
7th Overall Tour du Limousin
2013
3rd Grand Prix de la Ville de Lillers
3rd Tour de Vendée
5th Overall Paris–Arras Tour
5th Overall Ronde de l'Oise
2014
1st Grand Prix de la Ville de Lillers
1st Paris–Troyes
1st Stage 3 (TTT) Tour d'Auvergne
9th Overall Four Days of Dunkirk
2015
1st Road race, National Road Championships
1st Stage 2 Circuit des Ardennes
1st Stage 1 Route du Sud
2nd Boucles de l'Aulne
3rd Overall Ronde de l'Oise

1st Stage 2

6th Route Adélie de Vitré
2016
10th Grote Prijs Stad Zottegem
2017
9th Ronde van Limburg
