= Dariusz Wojciechowski =

Polish cyclist

Personal information
- Full name: Dariusz Wojciechowski
- Born: 13 July 1968 (age 58) Warsaw, Poland

Cycling career
- Sport: Cycling
- Current team: Retired
- Discipline: Rider/Directeur Sportif
- Role: Road

Professional teams
- 1996-2001: Mróz(-Supradyn Witaminy)
- 2002: Ambra Obuwie-SNC Odziez /Servisco-Koop
- 2003: Ambra-Weltour Radio Katowice
- 2004: Grupa PSB (2004)

Major wins
- Championnat de Pologne (1996); Tour de Sud (1998)

Dariusz Wojciechowski (born 13 July 1968) is a Polish former professional racing cyclist. Born in Warsaw, Poland, he entered professional cycling in 1996, and retired in 2005. He specialised in track early on. He is now the Sport Director of the Polish cycling team, MapaMap-BantProfi (MPM), which is a new Continental Team in 2007.

== Team membership ==
Wojciechowski has been a member of the following teams: Mróz(-Supradyn Witaminy) (1996–2001), Ambra Obuwie-SNC Odziez/Servisco-Koop (2002), Ambra-Weltour Radio Katowice (2003), and Grupa PSB (2004).

== Palmarès ==
1996
1st (Poland) Polish National Road Race Championships
Nationaler Meister (Strasse) (National Masters (Road))
Cztery Asy Fiata

1997
GP Miedzyrecz
Po Ziemi Gorzowski
GP Belchatow

1998
GP Solidarnosz
Tour du Sud (France)
Krupinski Cup

2 stages
Overall win

2000
Kronika Beskioska
Memorial Andrzeja Kaczyny i Andrzeja Malinowskiego (Raciborz)
GP Ostrowca Swietkorzyskiego
Puchar Trzech Miast
Race for the Cup of Three Towns
Commonwealth Bank Classic

Stage win
Overall win

Baltyk-Karkonosze (Poland)

1st stage (Rewal to Stargard Szczecinski), 3rd place
2nd stage, best climber
3rd stage (Stargard Szczecinski to Miedzyrzecz), 5th place
stage 5b (Jelenia Gora to Swidnica), 2nd place
General classification at race end, 3rd place

Commonwealth Bank Cycle Classic (Australia)

14th stage
General classification after 14th stage, 1st place

Kronika Beskidzka = GP Ostrowiec Swietokrzyski (Poland)
GP Weltour (Poland), 8th place

2001
Memorial Stanislawa Kirpszy (Sokolka)
