= Zygmunt Hanusik =

Polish cyclist (1945–2021)

Personal information
- Born: 28 February 1945 Wartogłowiec, Tychy, Poland
- Died: 4 March 2021 (aged 76) Katowice, Poland

Cycling career
- Sport: Cycling
- Discipline: Road
- Role: Rider

Zygmunt Hanusik (28 February 1945 – 4 March 2021) was a Polish cyclist. He competed in the individual road race at the 1968 Summer Olympics. Hanusik died on 4 March 2021, aged 76.

== Major results ==
1965
4th Overall Tour de Pologne
1966
4th Overall Tour de Pologne

1st Stage 10

1967
1st Stages 7 & 12 Milk Race
4th Overall Tour de Pologne

1st Stage 5

1968
6th Overall Peace Race

1st Stage 1

1969
1st Stage 1 Peace Race
1st Stage 2 Dookoła Mazowsza
2nd Overall Tour de Pologne

1st Stages 1 & 4

1970
1st Road race, Road Championships
1st Overall Tour d'Algérie 1

1st Stage 4b

2nd Overall Tour du Loir-et-Cher

1st Stages 1 (TTT) & 5

3rd Overall Peace Race

1st Stage 2

1971
2nd Overall Tour of Bulgaria

1st Stage 8

2nd Overall Grand Prix d'Annaba
7th Overall Tour de Pologne
1972
1st Overall Tour du Loir-et-Cher
3rd Road race, Road Championships
