= Karolina Perekitko =

Polish cyclist

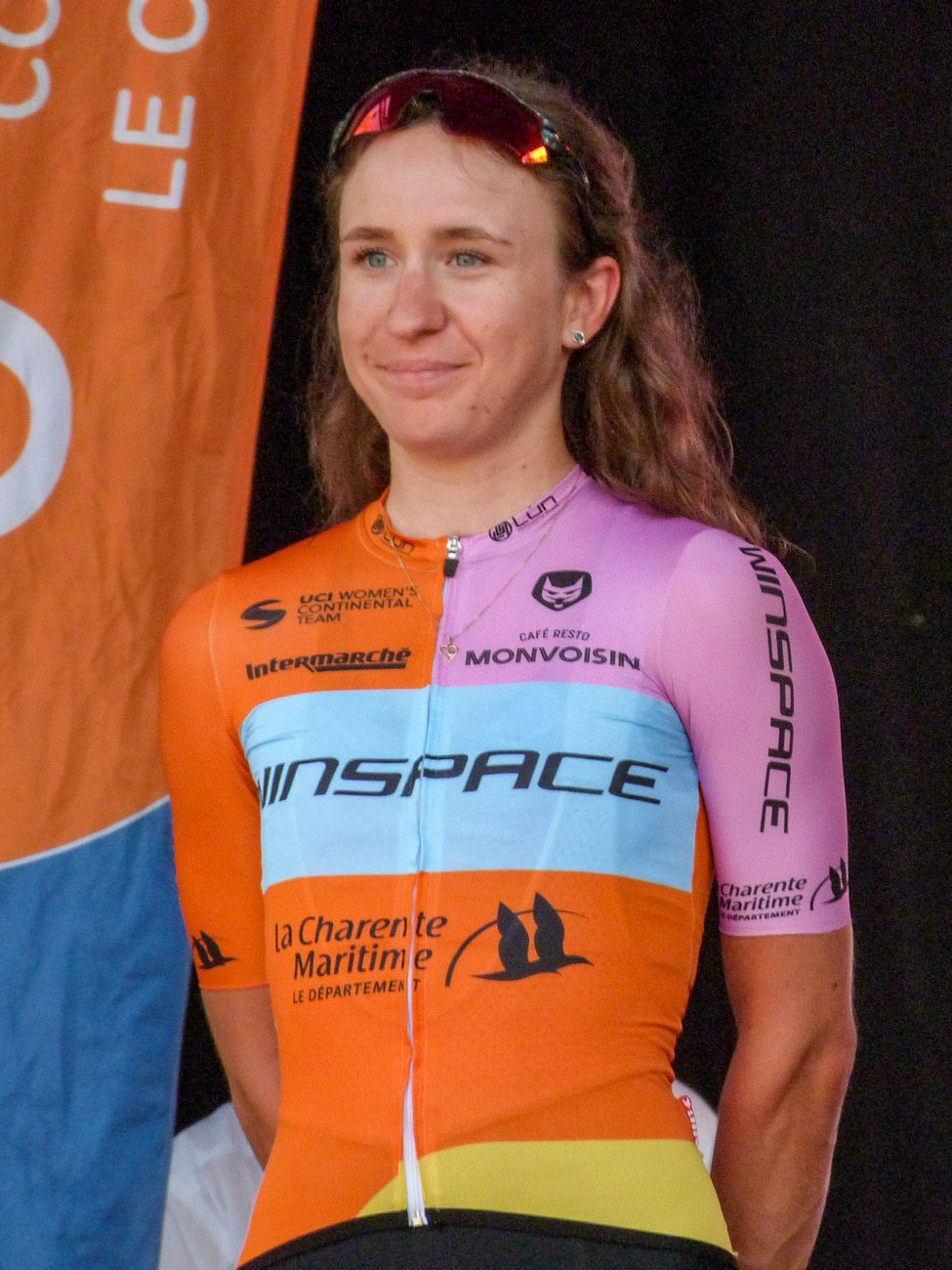
- Perekitko in 2024

Personal information
- Born: 1 October 1998 (age 28) Gdańsk, Poland

Cycling career
- Sport: Cycling
- Current team: Mayenne Monbana My Pie
- Discipline: Road cycling

Amateur team
- 2018: De Sprinters Malderen

Professional teams
- 2020: Massi–Tactic Women Team
- 2023: Team Groupe Abadie
- 2024–: Winspace

Karolina Perekitko (born 1 October 1998) is a Polish road cyclist, who currently rides for UCI Women's ProTeam Mayenne Monbana My Pie.

== Major results ==
2016
1st Road race, National Junior Championships
4th Road race, World Junior Championships
2023
2nd Road race, National Championships
7th Poreč Trophy Ladies
2024
2nd Groupama Ladies Race Slovakia
3rd Women Cycling Pro Costa De Almería
5th Alpes Grésivaudan Classic
6th Gran Premio Ciudad de Eibar
9th Grand Prix Féminin de Chambéry
10th Vuelta CV Feminas
10th Région Pays de la Loire Tour Féminin
2025
3rd Région Pays de la Loire Tour Féminin
7th Trofeo Palma Femina
8th Road race, National Championships
10th Alpes Grésivaudan Classic
10th Gran Premio Ciudad de Eibar
2026
4th Pionera Race-SCV
6th Alpes Grésivaudan Classic
7th Overall Volta a Catalunya Femenina
