= 2013 Chrono des Nations =

Race details
- Dates: 20 October 2013
- Stages: 1
- Distance: 57.025 km (35.43 mi)
- Winning time: 1h 10' 48"

Results
	Winner	Tony Martin (GER)
	Second	Gustav Larsson (SWE)
	Third	Sylvain Chavanel (FRA)

The 2013 Chrono des Nations was the 32nd edition of the Chrono des Nations individual time trial cycle race and was held on 20 October 2013. The race started and finished in Les Herbiers. The race was won by Tony Martin.

== General classification ==
Final general classification

Rank	Rider	Time
1	Tony Martin (GER)	1h 10' 48"
2	Gustav Larsson (SWE)	+ 14"
3	Sylvain Chavanel (FRA)	+ 45"
4	Marco Pinotti (ITA)	+ 1' 00"
5	Johan Le Bon (FRA)	+ 1' 05"
6	Carlos Oyarzun (CHI)	+ 2' 05"
7	Olivier Kaisen (BEL)	+ 2' 10"
8	Jérémy Roy (FRA)	+ 2' 24"
9	Nicolas Baldo (FRA)	+ 2' 26"
10	Anthony Delaplace (FRA)	+ 2' 48"
