= Jean-Marc Bideau =

French cyclist

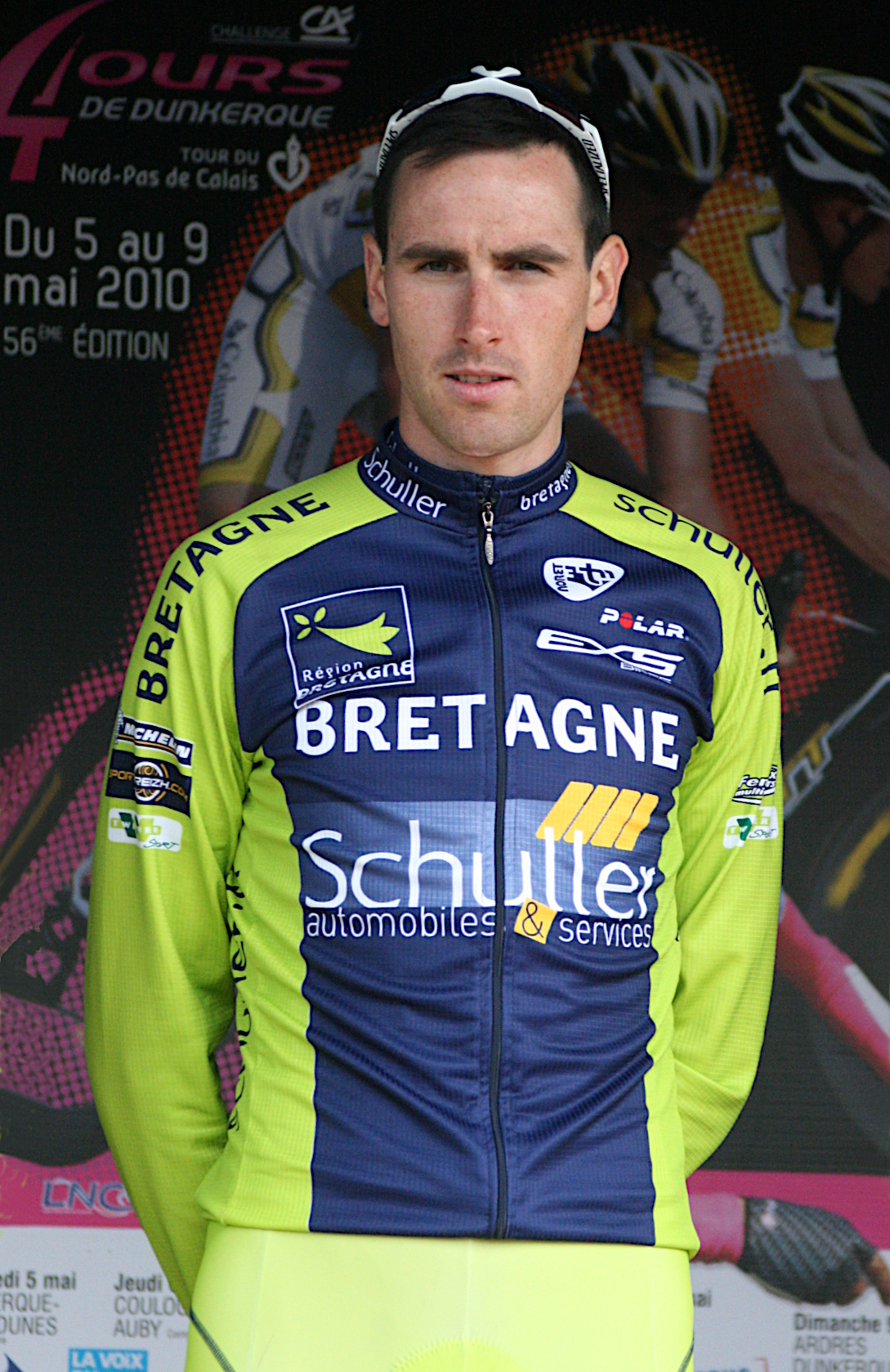
- Bideau in 2010

Personal information
- Born: 8 April 1984 (age 42) Quimperlé, France
- Height: 1.92 m (6 ft 4 in)
- Weight: 73 kg (161 lb; 11.5 st)

Cycling career
- Sport: Cycling
- Current team: Retired
- Discipline: Road
- Role: Rider

Amateur teams
- 1997–2003: VS Scaër
- 2004–2006: Super Sport 35–ACNC

Professional teams
- 2007: Unibet.com
- 2008: Roubaix–Lille Métropole
- 2009–2016: Bretagne–Schuller

Jean-Marc Bideau (born 8 April 1984) is a French former racing cyclist, who rode professionally between 2007 and 2016 for the Unibet.com, Roubaix–Lille Métropole and Fortuneo–Vital Concept teams. He rode in the 2014 Tour de France, finishing 115th in his only Grand Tour start.

== Major results ==
2007
5th Overall Grand Prix Chantal Biya
2008
8th Grand Prix de la ville de Pérenchies
10th Classic Loire Atlantique
2009
1st Stage 3 Kreiz Breizh Elites
3rd Grand Prix de la Ville de Lillers
2010
2nd Grand Prix de la Ville de Lillers
2nd Paris–Troyes
4th Classic Loire Atlantique
10th Paris–Camembert
2011
3rd Paris–Mantes-en-Yvelines
6th Overall Tour de Normandie

1st Stage 5

2012
1st Paris–Troyes
3rd Paris–Camembert
3rd Tour du Doubs
9th Overall Tour de Normandie

1st Stage 6

9th Overall Mi-Août en Bretagne
2013
1st Paris–Troyes
2014
5th Boucles de l'Aulne
9th Grand Prix de Plumelec-Morbihan
