= St. Michel–Preference Home–Auber93 (men's team) =

French cycling team

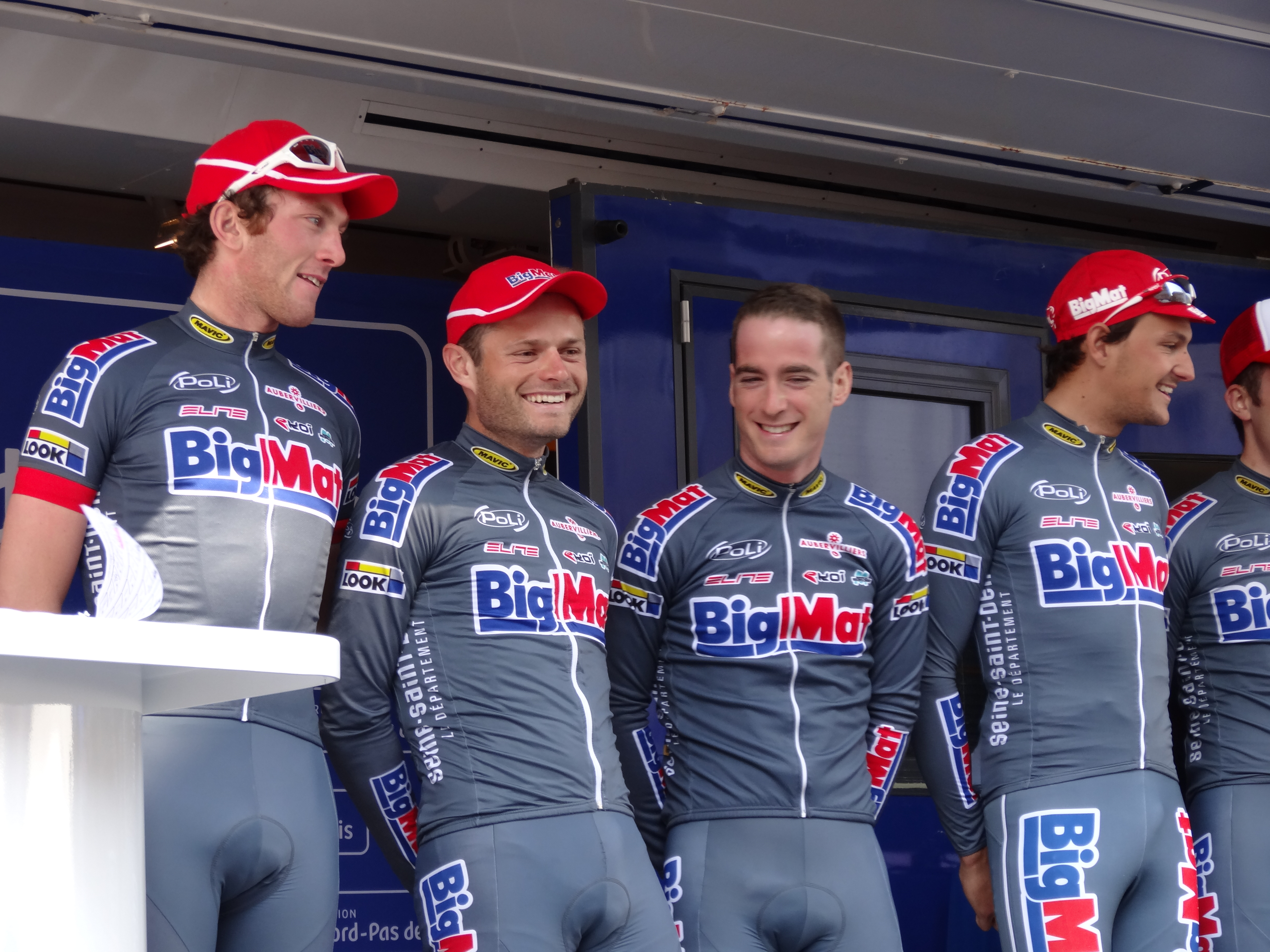

Team information
- UCI code: AUB
- Registered: France
- Founded: 1994
- Discipline: Road
- Status: Continental

Key personnel
- General manager: Stéphane Javalet
- Team manager: Stéphan Gaudry

Team name history
- 1994–1996 1997–2003 2004–2009 2010–2011 2012 2013–2014 2015 2016–2017 2018–2022 2023–2024 2025–: Aubervilliers 93–Peugeot; BigMat–Auber 93; Auber 93; BigMat–Auber 93; Auber 93; BigMat–Auber 93; Auber 93; HP BTP–Auber93; St. Michel–Auber93; St. Michel–Mavic–Auber93; St. Michel–Preference Home–Auber93

St. Michel–Preference Home–Auber93 (UCI team code: AUB) is a UCI Continental cycling team based in France. The team is managed by Stephane Javalet with the help of Stéphan Gaudry.

The team was founded in 1994 as Aubervilliers 93–Peugeot, a name they had until 1997 when they turned into BigMat–Auber 93. The team has participated in the Tour de France in 1996, 1997, 1998, 1999 and 2001. In 2004 the name changed to Auber 93, reverting to the current name in 2010. In 2015, BigMat once again stopped sponsoring the team.

The team is sponsored by French biscuit maker Saint-Michel and property developer Preference Home. Auber93 references the founding of the team in Aubervilliers, Île-de-France in 1993.

On May 12, 2026 the team announced that the club will focus its resources from 2027 onwards on a single professional team - the women's team registered in the UCI Women's ProTeam.

== Team roster ==
As of 12 March 2025.

| Rider | Date of birth |
|---|---|
| Lucas Beneteau (FRA) | 15 March 2002 (age 24) |
| Nicolas Breuillard (FRA) | 13 March 2000 (age 26) |
| Romain Cardis (FRA) | 12 August 1992 (age 34) |
| Thomas Champion (FRA) | 8 September 1999 (age 27) |
| Dillon Corkery (IRE) | 12 February 1999 (age 27) |

| Rider | Date of birth |
|---|---|
| Théo Delacroix (FRA) | 21 February 1999 (age 27) |
| Jérémy Lecroq (FRA) | 7 April 1995 (age 31) |
| Alan Riou (FRA) | 2 April 1997 (age 29) |
| Yohann Simon (FRA) | 16 September 2001 (age 25) |
| Morné van Niekerk (RSA) | 17 August 1995 (age 31) |

== Major wins ==
1996
Stage 6 Grand Prix du Midi Libre, Gilles Talmant
Stage 4 Tour de France, Cyril Saugrain
1997
Stage 4 Circuito Montañés, Anthony Morin
1998
Stage 5 Volta ao Algarve, Guillaume Auger
Stage 4 Tour de Normandie, Thierry Gouvenou
Paris–Camembert, Pascal Lino
Stages 3 & 8 Prudential Tour, Jay Sweet
Stage 4 Tour du Limousin, Philippe Bordenave
Stage 3 Tour de l'Avenir, Jay Sweet
Commonwealth Games, Road Race, Jay Sweet
1999
Stage 3a Tour Méditerranéen, Guillaume Auger
Stage 3 Tour de Normandie, Jay Sweet
Stage 2a Tour de l'Oise, Jay Sweet
Stage 6 Tour de l'Avenir, Alexandre Chouffe
2000
France, Road Race Championships, Christophe Capelle
Stage 3 Tour Down Under, Stéphane Bergès
Stage 2a Tour Méditerranéen, Jeremy Hunt
Stage 1 Sea Otter Classic, Jeremy Hunt
Overall Tour de Normandie, Ludovic Auger

Stage 2, Jay Sweet

Stage 1 Settimana Ciclistica Lombarda, Carlos Da Cruz
GP Stad Vilvoorde, Guillaume Auger
Stage 4 Tour de l'Ain, Denis Leproux
Stage 2b Circuit Franco-Belge, Jay Sweet
Stage 9 Herald Sun Tour, Jeremy Hunt
2001
(United Kingdom) Great Britain, Road Race Championships, Jeremy Hunt
Stage 1 & 2 International Tour of Rhodes, Jay Sweet
Stage 7 Circuito Montañés, Jay Sweet
Mi-Août 4, Alexei Sivakov
Stage 2b Tour de l'Ain, Jay Sweet
Prix de la Ville de Soissons, Benjamin Levecot
Overall Ster Elektrotoer, Xavier Jan
Stage 4 Circuit Franco-Belge, Jeremy Hunt
2002
Grand Prix d'Ouverture La Marseillaise, Xavier Jan
Stage 1 Circuit de la Sarthe, Christophe Capelle
Mi-Août 1, Nicolas Liboreau
GP Ouest–France, Jeremy Hunt
2003
Circuit des Mines, Guillaume Auger
Stage 1 Critérium du Dauphiné Libéré, Plamen Stoyanov
Mi-Août 4, Yannick Talabardon
Stage 2a Tour de la Somme, Guillaume Auger
2004
Stage 1 Tour de Normandie, Yannick Talabardon
Tour du Jura, Yannick Talabardon
Mi-Août 2, Yannick Talabardon
2005
Bordeaux–Saintes, John Nilsson
Grand Prix de la ville de Nogent-sur-Oise, Tristan Valentin
Tro-Bro Léon, Tristan Valentin
Paris–Mantes-en-Yvelines, Maxime Méderel
Stage 4 Tour de Gironde, Saïd Haddou
Stage 1 Paris–Corrèze, William Bonnet
2006
Les Monts Luberon, Rene Mandri
Stage 7 Tour de Normandie, Maxime Méderel
Grand Prix de Villers-Cotterêts, Émilien-Benoît Bergès
Stage 1 Tour du Poitou-Charentes, Saïd Haddou
2007
Tour du Finistère, Niels Brouzes
Paris–Mantes-en-Yvelines, Niels Brouzes
Tour du Jura, Guillaume Levarlet
Grand Prix Cristal Energie, Florian Morizot
2008
Paris–Mantes-en-Yvelines, Florian Morizot
Overall, Circuit de Lorraine, Steve Chainel

Stage 4, Steve Chainel

Overall Ronde de l'Oise, Niels Brouzes
Stage 4 Tour du Poitou-Charentes, Florian Morizot
Paris–Tours Espoirs, Tony Gallopin
2009
Stage 1 Tour de Normandie, Morgan Chedhomme
Stage 4 Tour de Normandie, Fabien Bacquet
Stage 4 Route du Sud, Johan Mombaerts
2010
Stage 2 Ronde de l'Oise, Nadir Haddou
2011
Stages 4 & 6 Tour de Normandie, Fabien Bacquet
Stage 5 Tour de Bretagne, Maxime Méderel
Overall Rhône-Alpes Isère Tour, Sylvain Georges

Stages 1 & 3, Sylvain Georges

Grand Prix de Plumelec-Morbihan, Sylvain Georges
2012
Stage 8 Tour de Normandie, Benoit Drujon
Stage 7 Tour de Bretagne, Dimitri Le Boulch
Stage 5 Circuit de Lorraine, Steven Tronet
2013
Les Boucles du Sud Ardèche, Mathieu Drujon
Stage 4 Tour du Limousin, Stéphane Rossetto
2014
Estonia Road Race Championships, Alo Jakin
Grand Prix de la Ville de Lillers, Steven Tronet
Paris–Troyes, Steven Tronet
Overall Boucles de la Mayenne, Stéphane Rossetto
2015
Paris–Troyes, David Menut
Stage 2 Circuit des Ardennes, Steven Tronet
Boucles de l'Aulne, Alo Jakin
Stage 2 Ronde de l'Oise, Steven Tronet
Stage 1 Route du Sud, Steven Tronet
France Road Race Championships, Steven Tronet
2016
Stage 4 Circuit des Ardennes, Alo Jakin
2017
La Roue Tourangelle, Flavien Dassonville
Overall Tour de Bretagne, Flavien Dassonville

Stage 2, Flavien Dassonville

Overall Ronde de l'Oise, Flavien Dassonville

Stage 1, Flavien Dassonville

2018
Overall Circuit des Ardennes International, Anthony Maldonado
Boucles de l'Aulne, Kévin Le Cunff
Stage 2 Ronde de l'Oise, Damien Touzé
Overall Kreiz Breizh Elites, Damien Touzé

Stage 1, Damien Touzé

2019
Overall Ronde de l'Oise, Anthony Maldonado

Stage 2, Anthony Maldonado

2021
Paris–Troyes, Romain Cardis
Stage 2 Tour Poitou-Charentes en Nouvelle-Aquitaine, Jason Tesson
Overall À travers les Hauts-de-France, Jason Tesson

Stage 1, Jason Tesson

== National champions ==
2000
French Road Race Championships, Christophe Capelle
2001
British Road Race Championships, Jeremy Hunt
2014
Estonian Road Race Championships, Alo Jakin
2015
French Road Race Championships, Steven Tronet

== Achievements in Tour de France ==
Team classification

- 1996:
- 1997: 13th
- 1998: 9th
- 1999: 16th
- 2001: 21st

== Former riders ==
- Ludovic Auger
- Stéphane Barthe
- William Bonnet
- Christophe Capelle
- Steve Chainel
- Carlos Da Cruz
- Mathieu Drujon
- Said Haddou
- Stéphane Heulot
- Arnold Jeannesson
- Arnaud Labbe
- Pascal Lance
- Guillaume Levarlet
- Pascal Lino
- Rene Mandri
- Julien Mazet
- Anthony Morin
- John Nilsson
- Cyril Saugrain
- Tony Gallopin
- Mathieu Drujon

== See also ==
- List of UCI professional continental and continental teams
- 1996 Tour de France
- 1997 Tour de France
- 1998 Tour de France
- 1999 Tour de France
- 2001 Tour de France
