= Stanisław Kłosowicz =

Polish cyclist (1903–1955)

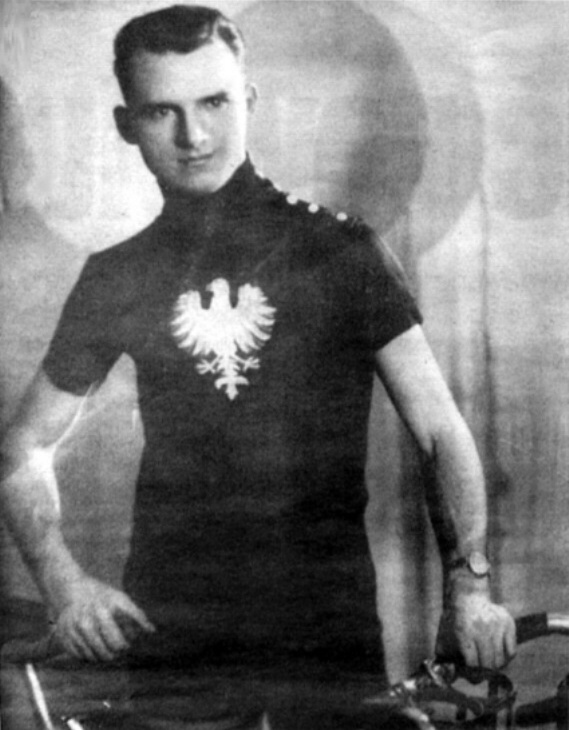
- Stanisław Kłosowicz

Personal information
- Born: 4 March 1903 Krasnoyarsk, Russia
- Died: 16 October 1955 (aged 52) Radom, Poland

Cycling career
- Sport: Cycling

Stanisław Kłosowicz (4 March 1903 – 16 October 1955) was a Polish cyclist. He competed in the individual and team road race events at the 1928 Summer Olympics.
