= Rachel Dard =

French cyclist

Rachel Dard (born 2 September 1951) was a French professional cyclist said to have raced across France to avoid a positive dope finding and ended up in a row which exposed organised drug-taking in cycling in the 1970s. His sporting career began with ACBB Paris.

== Dope test ==
Dard was riding for Peugeot in 1976. Maurice De Muer was the manager, Bernard Thévenet the star rider and François Bellocq the doctor. At the start of that year the team rode L'Étoile des Espoirs, a stage race in south-west France. Jean-Luc Vandenbroucke was race leader and Dard, his teammate, had won the stage to Dax.

Dard and a further teammate, Bourreau, were called for a dope test. Both were caught trying to defraud the control with a condom of untainted urine in their shorts to give the impression they were urinating.

Dard, it was reported, left the control room and then realised that his place in the race, perhaps his team, were over before the season had properly started. He found the doctor, Bruno Chaumont, and begged him not to report the positive. Chaumont agreed to burn the reports. Dard then realised that while there may be no positive report, the absence of a report meant there had been no test either. He would have to explain why Chaumont had returned to the French federation with two empty bottles identified as his.

Bourreau had accepted his guilt and didn't want to take it further. But Dard is said to have gone back to the test centre for the empty bottles. But Chaumont had left by train to Paris. Dard got a lift to the station with another Peugeot rider, Bernard Croyet. They arrived just as Chaumont's train left for Paris. The two ran back to their car and drove across France to get to Paris before him. They reached Austerlitz station in time to meet Chaumont on the platform. Dard begged until tears ran down his face, literally. And again Chaumont relented. He took out the two bottles and smashed them. Dard (see below) disputes the story.

Chaumont said:

That evening, I took the train with the empty test bottles closed with seals. There was no question of taking samples from the riders because they had cheated. The next morning, at Austerlitz station in Paris, at 6.30am, who do I see? Rachel Dard, accompanied by a second person, short with brown curly hair, that I didn't recognise. He begged me not to denounce him. After hesitating, I agreed. I threw the test bottles into the gutter to show him that I understood his problems but I made him promise not to say anything. Well, pretty quickly, everything was revealed. Who talked? Certainly not me.

== Revelations ==
Weeks passed and nothing happened. Then L'Équipe coincidentally ran a story about dope-taking in French cycling. Chaumont told the tale. Dard now had nothing more to lose, so he too went to L'Équipe and spilled the inside story, right down to providing the prescriptions for dope that Bellocq, the team doctor, had given him. He said riders treated with cortisone and steroids were now in "a pitiful state".

== Row ==
A row then broke out between Dard and the doctor. Dard said:

I never cheated. Everything is false, from beginning to end. There never were any empty bottles. I never had a morning meeting at Austerlitz station. My car is a 504 diesel and I'd never have been able to drive from Dax to Paris at the speed of a train.

To which the doctor replied:

His attitude is incredible [c'est fabuleux, une pareille attitude]. But I can understand Rachel Dard; but finally, if he had never confessed, I would never have dropped him. I would have defended him. I don't want the death of a sinner. I came into cycling to try to overcome the wall that exists between the cyclist and the doctor. I'm not there to do the dirty on anyone [pour faire tomber un tel ou un autre].

The story, however, also appears in a book by the team doctor, Bellocq, who died aged 47 in 1993 and was a believer in cortisone as a treatment for racing cyclists. Bernard Thévenet accused him of ruining his career.

== Aftermath ==
Bellocq was banned from working for the French federation, although he continued to work for teams. Chaumont, too, was disciplined by the Fédération Française de Cyclisme.

The doping historian, Dr Jean-Pierre de Mondenard, named Peugeot's manager, Maurice de Muer, as the "gold medallist" in doping in cycling.

"You'd be hard-pushed to count how many doping affairs [Maurice de Muer] has been involved with... at the head of Bic, then Peugeot. [He had] for the period 1970–1978 twenty-four positive cases concerning riders in these teams of the 70 total. That's 36 per cent!"

Peugeot was in no moral position to fire Dard. He raced at least once again but de Muer told him he would never ride anything better than third-rate events. Dard left the team and racing at the end of his contract. He opened a bike shop in Saint-Germain-du-Plain in Burgundy.

== See also ==
- List of doping cases in cycling
