= Sławomir Krawczyk =

Polish cyclist

Personal information
- Born: 28 May 1963 (age 63) Trzebiatów, Poland

Cycling career
- Sport: Cycling
- Current team: Retired
- Discipline: Road
- Role: Rider

Amateur team
- Legia Warszawa

Professional team
- 1992: Lampre–Colnago

Sławomir Krawczyk (born 28 May 1963) is a Polish former road cyclist.

== Major results ==
1984
1st Overall Dookoła Mazowsza

1st Stages 1 & 3

1985
1st Stage 3 Dookoła Mazowsza
1986
1st Road race, National Road Championships
1st Overall Dookoła Mazowsza

1st Stage 1

1st Prologue Tour de Pologne
2nd Overall Tour du Loir-et-Cher
1987
4th Overall Tour de Pologne
1988
1st Prologue Tour de Pologne
1989
2nd Overall Tour de Pologne
1990
1st La Côte Picarde
1st Puchar Ministra Obrony Narodowej
1st Flèche d'or (with Bertrand Ziegler)
2nd Paris–Roubaix Amateurs
2nd Road race, National Road Championships
1991
1st Paris–Mantes
1st Overall Tour de Nouvelle-Calédonie
3rd Grand Prix de la Ville de Lillers
