= Paris–Troyes =

French one-day road cycling race

Race details
- Date: Mid March
- Region: Northern France
- English name: Paris–Troyes
- Local name: Paris–Troyes (in French)
- Discipline: Road
- Competition: UCI Europe Tour
- Type: One-day race

History
- First edition: 1959
- Editions: 67 (as of 2026)
- First winner: Michel Bauchet (FRA)
- Most wins: Yuri Trofimov (RUS); Jean-Marc Bideau (FRA) (2 wins)
- Most recent: Silas Köch (GER)

Paris–Troyes is an annual single-day road bicycle race in France between Paris and Troyes. First held in 1959, since 2005 it has been a 1.2 event on the UCI Europe Tour.

== List of winners ==
Year	Country	Rider	Team
1959	France	Michel Bauchet	
1960	France	Daniel Dhieux	
1961	France	Claude Faveaux	
1962	France	Roger Jubé	
1963	France	Max Sinoquet	
1964	France	Jean-Pierre Puccianti	
1965	France	André Desvages	
1966	Spain	Agustín Tamames	
1967	France	Robert Bouloux	
1968	Netherlands	Henk Hiddinga	
1969	France	Jean Thomazeau	
1970	France	Christian Poissenot	
1971	No race		
1972	France	Jacques Esclassan	
1973	France	Guy Dolhats	
1974	France	Gérard Colinelli	
1975	No race		
1976	France	Hubert Linard	
1977	France	Didier Van Vlaslaer	
1978	Great Britain	Graham Jones	
1979	France	Philippe Badouard	
1980	France	Michel Larpe	
1981	Belgium	Jozef Lieckens	
1982	Belgium	Nico Emonds	
1983	Belgium	Martin Durant	
1984	Belgium	Carlo Bomans	
1985	France	Jean-Jacques Philipp	
1986	Belgium	Banjamin Van Itterbeeck	
1987	France	Frédéric Gallerne	
1988	France	Laurent Bezault	
1989	France	Hervé Lepinay	
1990	France	Thierry Arnould	
1991	France	Thierry Dupuy	
1992	France	Didier Faivre-Pierret	
1993	Great Britain	Simeon Hempsall	
1994	Canada	Gordon Fraser	
1995	France	Denis Moretti	
1996	France	Jérôme Gannat	
1997	France	Eric Salvetat	
1998	Lithuania	Saulius Ruškys	
1999	Belgium	Marc Chanoine	
2000	France	Christophe Marcoux	
2001	Chile	José Medina	
2002	France	Mickaël Buffaz	VC Lyon Vaulx-en-Velin
2003	Switzerland	Xavier Pache	CC Etupes
2004	France	Olivier Grammaire	SCO Dijon
2005	France	Florent Brard	Agritubel–Loudun
2006	Russia	Yuri Trofimov	Omnibike Dynamo Moscow
2007	Russia	Yuri Trofimov	Moscow Stars
2008	France	Jean-Luc Delpech	Bretagne–Armor Lux
2009	France	Yannick Talabardon	Besson Chaussures–Sojasun
2010	France	Cédric Pineau	Roubaix–Lille Métropole
2011	France	Jonathan Hivert	Saur–Sojasun
2012	France	Jean-Marc Bideau	Bretagne–Schuller
2013	France	Jean-Marc Bideau	Bretagne–Séché Environnement
2014	France	Steven Tronet	BigMat–Auber 93
2015	France	David Menut	Auber 93
2016	France	Rudy Barbier	Roubaix–Métropole Européenne de Lille
2017	France	Yannis Yssaad	Armée de Terre
2018	France	Adrien Petit	Direct Énergie
2019	France	Jérémy Cabot	SCO Dijon–Team Materiel–velo.com
2020	No race due to COVID-19 pandemic		
2021	France	Romain Cardis	St. Michel–Auber93
2022	Great Britain	Robert Scott	WiV SunGod
2023	France	Gwen Leclainche	Philippe Wagner Cycling
2024	Australia	Liam Walsh	Team BridgeLane
2025	Italy	Juan David Sierra	Tudor Pro Cycling Team U23
2026	Germany	Silas Köch	Team Lotto–Kern Haus Outlet Montabaur
