= Józef Stefański =

Polish cyclist

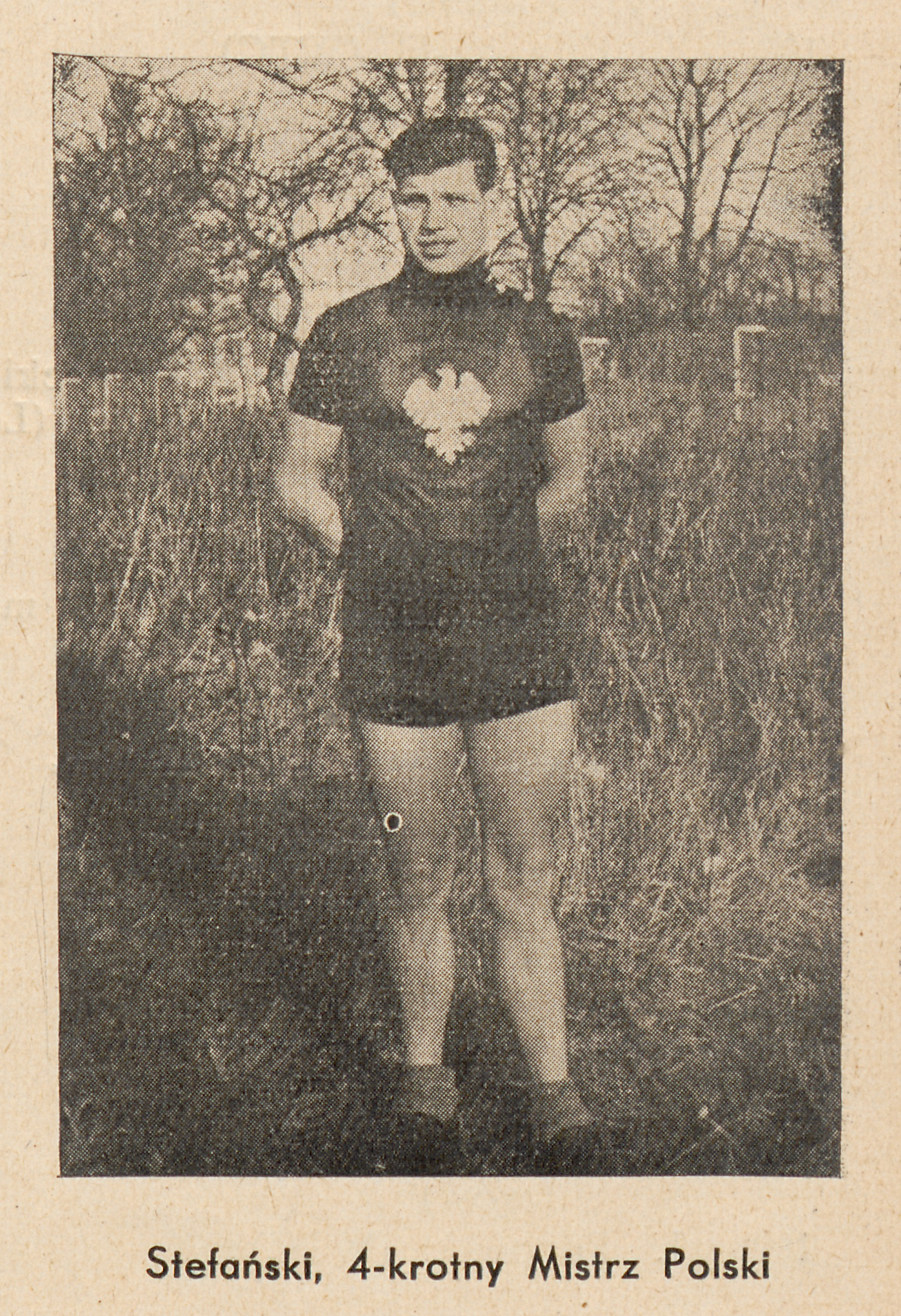

Personal information
- Born: 7 February 1908 Goliany, Russian Empire
- Died: 21 December 1997 (aged 89) Warsaw, Poland

Cycling career
- Sport: Cycling

Józef Stefański (7 February 1908 – 21 December 1997) was a Polish cyclist. He competed in the individual and team road race events at the 1928 Summer Olympics. He won the 1929 edition of the Tour de Pologne.
