= Janusz Kowalski (cyclist) =

Polish cyclist (born 1952)

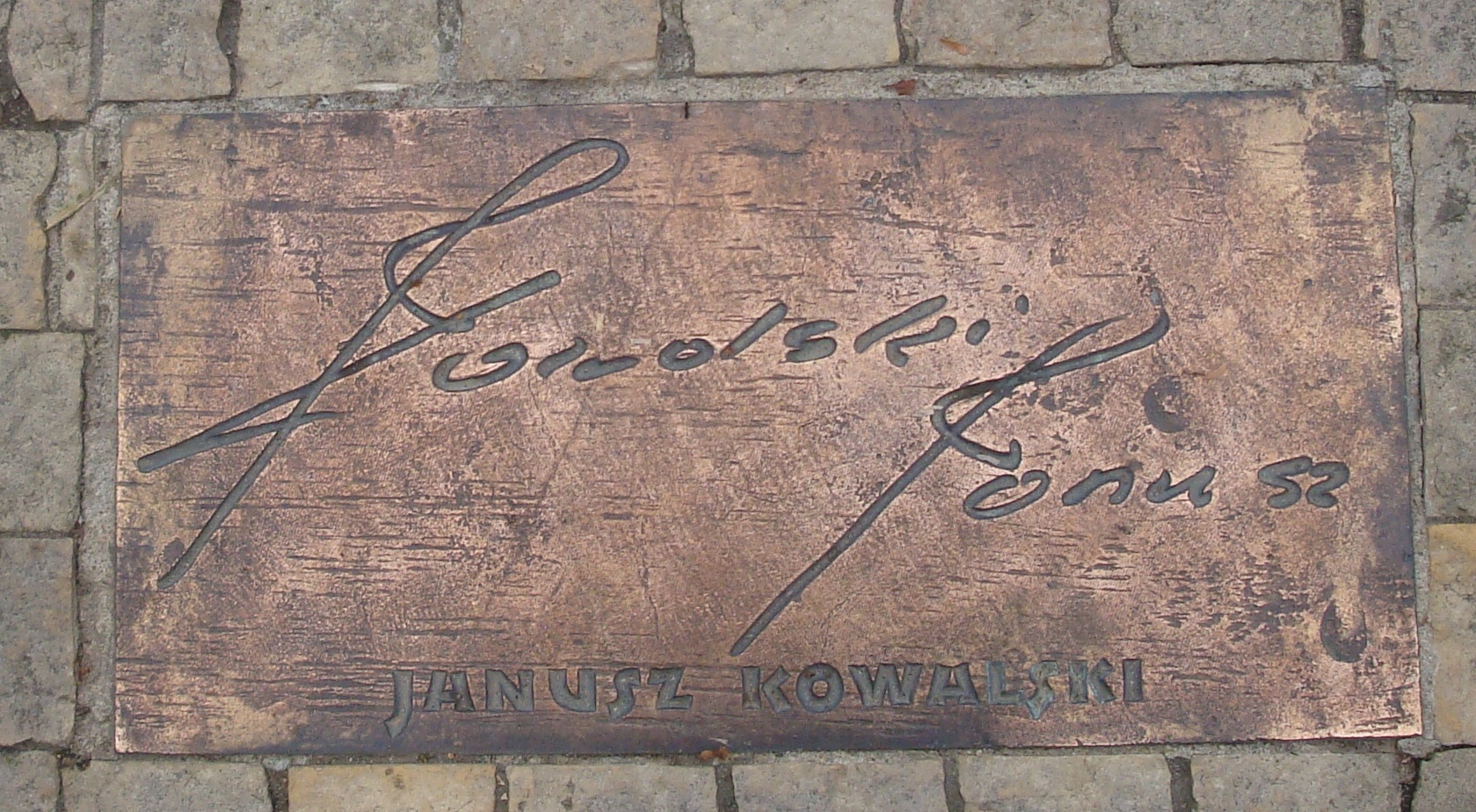

Personal information
- Full name: Janusz Kowalski
- Born: 8 June 1952 (age 74) Świebodzin, Poland

Cycling career
- Sport: Cycling
- Discipline: Road
- Role: Rider
Medal record
Representing Poland
Men's road bicycle racing
World Championships
Gold medal – first place	1974 Montreal	Amateurs' road race

Janusz Kowalski (born 8 June 1952) is a Polish former racing cyclist. He won the Tour de Pologne 1976.

== Career achievements ==
Date	Placing	Event	Location	Country
1973	1	Stage 8, Tour de Pologne	Międzyrzecz	Poland
1973	3rd place, bronze medalist(s)	Polish National Road Race Championships	Żywiec	Poland
1974	1st place, gold medalist(s)	Amateurs' road race, UCI Road World Championships	Montreal	Canada
1974	3rd place, bronze medalist(s)	Polish National Hill Climb Championships	Karpacz	Poland
1974	3rd place, bronze medalist(s)	Polish National Road Race Championships	Zakopane	Poland
1975	1	Stage 9a, Milk Race	Seacroft	United Kingdom
1975	1	General Classification, Tour of Bulgaria		Bulgaria
1975	1	General Classification, Tour of Małopolska		Poland
1976	1	Stage 3, Tour de Pologne,	Gorzów Wielkopolski	Poland
1976	1	General Classification, Tour de Pologne		Poland
1979	1	Stage 6 Tour de Pologne	Polanica	Poland
