= Marian Kegel =

Polish cyclist

Personal information
- Born: 25 May 1945 Poznań, Poland
- Died: 19 September 1972 (aged 27) Poznań, Poland

Cycling career
- Sport: Cycling

Marian Kegel (25 May 1945 – 19 September 1972) was a Polish cyclist. He competed in the individual road race and the team time trial events at the 1968 Summer Olympics.
