= Johanna Krawczyk =

French writer and screenwriter (born 1984)

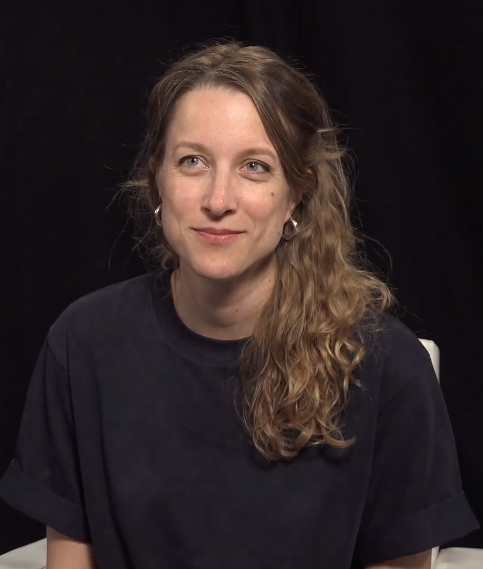
- In a 2024 interview
- Born: 1984 (age 41–42)
- Education: Sciences Po; UCL; Paris 3
- Occupations: Writer, screenwriter

Johanna Krawczyk (born 1984) is a French writer and screenwriter. She was educated at Sciences Po, UCL and Paris 3.

In 2019 she co-wrote the Cannes-nominated short film, L'heure de l'ours (And Then the Bear). Director and co-writer Agnès Patron described the process as "a very instinctive collaboration."

Avant elle, her first novel, was published in 2021 and was shortlisted for the Prix de la Closerie des Lilas.
