= Józef Gawliczek =

Polish cyclist

Personal information
- Born: 20 January 1939 (age 87) Mszana, Poland

Cycling career
- Sport: Cycling
- Role: Rider

Józef Gawliczek (born 20 January 1939) is a Polish former racing cyclist. He won Tour of Britain and the Tour de Pologne 1966.
