= Franciszek Zawadzki =

Polish cyclist and bicycle manufacturer

Personal information
- Birth name: Franciszek Zawadzki
- Nationality: Polish
- Born: 6 October 1887; Żelechowo
- Died: 7 November 1975 (aged 88); Warsaw

Sport
- Club: Warszawskie Towarzystwo Cyklistów

Franciszek Zawadzki (Polish pronunciation: [fraɲˈt͡ɕiʂɛɡ zaˈvat͡skʲi]; 6 October 1887 – 7 November 1975) was a Polish bicycle manufacturer, road racing cyclist and the first Polish national champion.

== Cycling career ==
Before the end of First World War, when Poland restored full independence, he became the champion in road bicycle racing of Congress Poland twice in 1910 and 1911. On August 24, 1919, he won the first 100 km (about 62 miles) race in independent Poland. Race was organised by Warsaw Cyclists' Society (Warszawskie Towarzystwo Cyklistów). Zawadzki was its member between 1910 and 1921. In the next championships in 1921 Zawadzki took the fourth place.

== Entrepreneurship ==
In 1917 he opened a manufactory in Warsaw which was located in Bagatela Street. In the first year only 17 bikes were produced but in the 1930s this number rose to 30 per day. The bicycles were of good quality but they were not cheap. They had exceptionally light frames and comfortable Brooks bike saddles with two springs for better suspension. They were used mainly by rich manufacturers, traders and policemen. A bicycle was a very popular mean of transport during the interwar period in Poland. Manufactory was bringing notable profits and Zawadzki became rich.

== The WWII and its aftermaths ==
Before 1939 Zawadzki wanted to move the manufactory to the village Glina in Otwock County but he didn't manage to build it before the World War II started. The old manufactory and his house in Warsaw were destroyed by the bombs and he moved with his wife and their only child to his villa in a village Stara Wieś (Otwock County). During the war his estate was robbed by the Nazis. His son Zbyszek took part in Warsaw Uprising where he was captured by the Germans and brought to a death camp in Stutthof. He tried to escape but failed. Presumably he was transported near Hamburg and killed there. After the war Zawadzki's estate was nationalised. He opened a workshop in Stara Wieś where he fixed bicycles. In 1968 his wife was hit by a car and she died. Zawadzki married for the second time. He sold his villa and donated the money for a new kindergarten in the village. Then he moved to Warsaw where he died. He is buried together with his wife at Powązki Cemetery where also a memorial of his son is located.
