= Mieczysław Wilczewski =

Polish cyclist

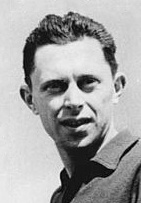
- Wilczewski in 1960

Personal information
- Born: 30 October 1932 Zdołbunów, Poland
- Died: 8 December 1993 (aged 61) Cocoa Beach, Florida, United States
- Height: 1.79 m (5 ft 10 in)
- Weight: 70 kg (150 lb)

Sport
- Sport: Cycling
- Club: Ruch Chorzów

Mieczysław Stefan Wilczewski (30 October 1932 – 8 December 1993) was a Polish cyclist. He competed at the 1960 Summer Olympics in the 100 km team time trial and finished in 10th place. He won the Tour de Pologne in 1953. That same year he was awarded the Silver Cross of Merit by the Polish government for his accomplishment. In the 1970s he emigrated to the United States, and he died in Cocoa Beach, Florida in 1993.
