= Jan Krawczyk =

Polish cyclist

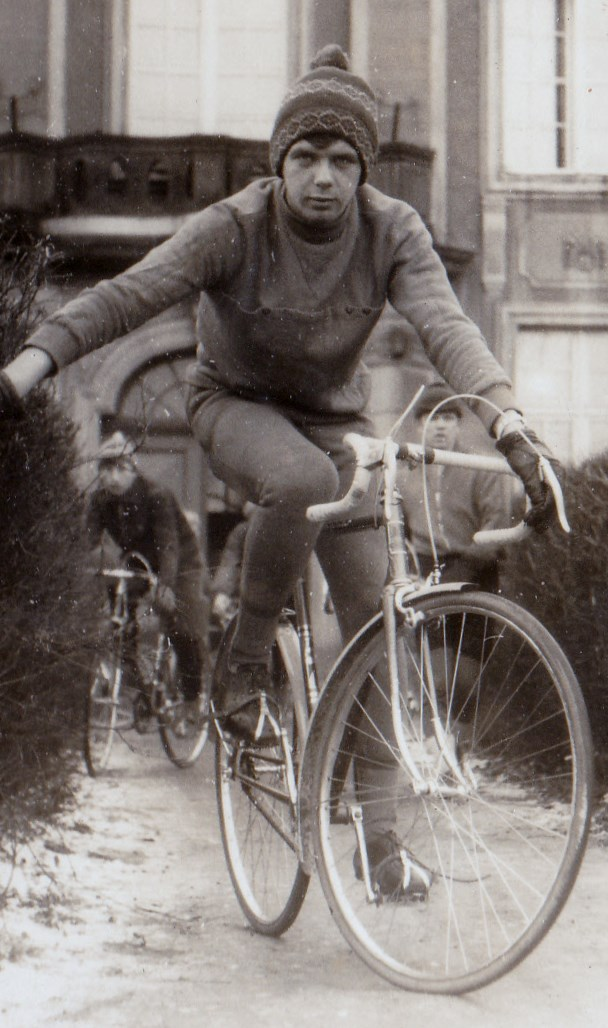

Personal information
- Born: 10 June 1956 Zakrzówek Szlachecki, Poland
- Died: 14 July 2018 (aged 62) Piotrków Trybunalski, Poland

Cycling career
- Sport: Cycling
- Role: Rider

Jan Krawczyk (10 June 1956 – 14 July 2018) was a Polish former racing cyclist. He was ranked third in 1979 Tour de Pologne.

== Bibliography ==
- Bogdan Tuszyński, Złota księga kolarstwa polskiego, Publisher: Polska Oficyna Wydawnicza "BGW", Warsaw, 1995
