= Henryk Krawczyk =

Henryk Krawczyk (born 1946 in Poland) is a professor and rector of Gdańsk University of Technology since 2008.

== Scientific degrees ==
- MS in Design Computer Architecture, GUT, 1969
- PhD in Analysis Testability of Digital Systems, GUT, 1976
- DsC in Diagnosability Conditions for Computer Distributed Systems, GUT, 1987
- Prof. granted by President of Poland, 1996

== Academic functions ==
- Vice director of Computer Science Institute 1998 – 1990
- Dean of Faculty of Electronics, Telecommunication and Informatics 1991 – 1996, 2002 – 2008
- Rector of Gdańsk University of Technology 2008 – 2016
- Member of Polish Academy of Sciences since 2007

== Teaching subjects ==
- Computer Architecture
- System Dependability
- Software Quality Assurance
- Design Information Processing Systems
- Collaborative Computing
- Information Society Development

== Research interests ==
- Diagnosability of Systems and Networks
- Parallel Software Testing
- Quality Management in Software Life Cycle
- Modelling and Analysis of Negotiation Procedures
- High Performance Computing
- Service Oriented Computing

== Publications ==
Over 350 publications in main topics of research interests given above including papers in IEEE Trans. on Computers, Euromicro, Lecture Notes in Computer Science, chapters in books issued by Chapman and Hall, LNH Elsevier, Nova Science, Springer – Verlag and presentations in many IEEE conference proceedings and also scientific lectures given in many universities such as University of Oulu (Finland), New Hampshire University (USA), University of Basrah (Irag), Izmir University (Turkey), Autonomous University of Barcelona (Spain), Bristol University (England), Nova University of Lisbon (Portugal), Lecee University (Italy) and the book entitled Analysis and Testing of Distributed Software Applications issued by RSP London in cooperation with John Wiley & Sons.

== Sources ==
- Mazurkiewicz B. red (2014). Rektorzy i prorektorzy Politechniki Gdańskiej 1904-2014. Wydawnictwo Politechniki Gdańskiej. ISBN 9788373485624.
